= Azucena Grajo Uranza =

Azucena Grajo Uranza (27 January 1929 – 12 March 2012) is a Filipino novelist, short story writer, and playwright in the English language.

== Biography ==
Uranza was born in Sorsogon, Sorsogon. She graduated from the Far Eastern University of the Philippines where she acquired a Bachelor of Arts in journalism in 1952 and then an MA in English in 1969. Apart from being a writer, Uranza was also an associate professor of Literature and the Humanities at Far Eastern University. As a playwright, she wrote for the theater, radio, and television. Her plays were produced by Channel 4 (television), DZRH (radio), and the Far Eastern University.

Uranza began writing at the age of 13 during World War II, when paper was scarce. She wrote her early accounts of the war on the backs of legal documents kept by her father, who worked as a lawyer. These experiences later influenced her literary works, particularly her novels about Philippine history and wartime experiences.

== Works ==
=== Novels ===
She has written the novels, Bamboo in the Wind (1990), A Passing Season (2002), Feast of the Innocents (2003) and the Women of Tammuz (2004). It spans a hundred years of Philippine history and, in terms of chronology, A Passing Season is the first, followed by The Women of Tammuz, after which Bamboo in the Wind came Martial Law by the former Philippine president and despot, Ferdinand Edralin Marcos. The fourth part of the saga is the Feast of Innocents, set in the Philippines' post-People Power period. Uranza's novels keep the Filipinos' history alive.

A Passing Season is the saga of families during the time of the twin wars of 1896 and 1898, known in history as the Philippine Revolution and the Filipino-American War. It is the story of the Eduartes, the de Almogueiras, the Herreras, and their neighbor and occasional friends, the Ricaforts, trying to hold on to old and trusted rituals of daily life amidst the turbulence and upheaval in the last years of the nineteenth century in Manila. It is a novel about ordinary people - of Tibor and Aurora, Masin and his cousin Subas, of Torcuato, the servant boy who knows no other existence, but who, in the end, establishes a kinship with the epical heroes of the nation because his sacrifice has not been less noble.

Women of Tammuz continues the saga with the stories revolving around the Eduartes and the Herreras right before and during World War II.

Set in Manila in the last months before the politico-military take-over in 1972, Bamboo in the Wind tells of the last desperate efforts of a people fighting to stave off disaster. Amid the escalating madness of a deteriorating regime, an assortment of people - a senator, a young nationalist, a dispossessed farmer, a radical activist, a convent school girl, a Jesuit scholastic, including the Eduartes, the Herreras, and their friends - make their way along the corridors of greed and power. Each is forced to examine his own commitment in the face of brutality and evil, as the book conjures up scene after scene of devastation: the massacre of the demonstrators, the demolition of Sapang Bato, the murder of the sugar plantation workers, the burning of the Laguardia ricefields. And, as a climax to the mounting violence, that final September day - the arrests, the torture, and finally the darkness that overtakes the land.

In the Feast of the Innocents, we see the conclusion of the story of the Eduarte and Herrera families, who struggle to stay connected by means of their memories and the good they believe in, because these are the best weapons against the more sophisticated forms of present-day evil. Their fortunes have blended with their country's history in a counterpoint with the national dreams: their great-grandfathers had fought in the Revolution and the Philippine–American War; their fathers had gone to Bataan to fight a hopeless defense of their homeland; and they themselves had waged a covert campaign against a dictatorship. Now it is nearing the end of the next century and the country seems to be facing a hopeful time. The Eduartes and Herreras of the present generation must exercise eternal vigilance as they, like all decent Filipino families, confront violence, falsehood, and greed. Tony Eduarte comes face to face with a misguided colonel; Raul Herrera stands his ground against an unscrupulous newspaperman; Cielo Munoz tries to retrieve a child prostitute from the streets of Manila as she seeks to find meaning in the poverty and hopelessness around her. Feast of the Innocents is a novel of contemporary dreams and realities.

=== Other works ===
Uranza was also the author of the 2005 anthology of short stories entitled Voices in a Minor Key, a volume of 22 short stories, and a book of plays entitled Masks and Mirrors. Many of her short stories appeared in the pages of Filipino magazines such as Philippines Free Press, Weekly Women's Magazine, Focus Magazine. She also wrote a coffee table book entitled Arbol, An Etnographic Record of a Family.

== Recognition ==
Uranza was the recipient of the Philippine Centennial Awards for Literature, the Palanca Memorial Awards for Literature, the Focus Philippines Literary Awards, the Pama-as, the Gintong Bai Award (National Commission for Culture and the Arts), and the Green and Gold Artist Award (Far Eastern University).

Among her notable literary achievements, her play "Versions of the Dawn" won first prize in the Carlos Palanca Memorial Awards for Literature in 1958. Her novel Bamboo in the Wind also received the Grand Prize in the novel category of the 1990 Palanca Awards.

== See also ==
- Ninotchka Rosca
- Cecilia Manguerra Brainard
- Lualhati Bautista
