= Women of Tammuz =

2004 novel by Azucena Grajo Uranza

- Book cover
- Author: Azucena Grajo Uranza
- Language: English literature
- Genre: Fiction
- Published: Makati City: Bookmark, 2004
- Publication place: Philippines
- Media type: Book
- Pages: 482
- ISBN: 971-569-494-2
- OCLC: 60453846
- Preceded by: A Passing Season
- Followed by: Feast of the Innocents

The Women of Tammuz is a 2004 prize-winning novel written by Filipino author Azucena Grajo-Uranza It won two Philippine National Book Awards in 2004, namely the Juan C. Laya Award for being the Best Novel in a Philippine Language, and the Juan C. Laya Award for being the Best Novel in a Foreign Language. After Bamboo in the Wind, the Women of Tammuz is chronologically the third in Uranza's saga and is followed by the Feast of the Innocents.

== Description ==
In the Women of Tammuz Uranza traced the lives of Filipinos, most of which are women through the peaceful and untroubled days before the Second World War up to the Japanese Occupation period. The war novel ends with the emancipation of Manila. According to F. Sionil José, Women of Tammuz is “more than a novel on the war, [ it ] portrays evocatively the courage of ordinary Filipinos as they persevere through tragedy”.
