= 1976 Palanca Awards =

Philippine literary award

26th Palanca Awards

The 26th Don Carlos Palanca Memorial Awards for Literature was held to commemorate the memory of Don Carlos Palanca Sr. through an endeavor that would promote education and culture in the country. This year saw the inclusion of a new category, Full-Length Play/Dulang Ganap ang Haba, for both the English and Filipino Divisions.

LIST OF WINNERS

The 1976 winners were divided into eight categories, open only to English and Filipino [Tagalog] short story, poetry, one-act play, and full-length play:

== English Division ==
=== Short Story ===
- First Prize: Paul Stephen Lim, “Taking Flight”
- Second Prize: Leoncio P. Deriada, “Trilogy”
- Third Prize: Jose Nadal Carreon, “The Chieftain's Trophy, Abunnawas”

=== Poetry ===
- First Prize: Gémino H. Abad, “The Space Between”
- Second Prize: Ricardo M. De Ungria, “Poyms Tch Tch Passwords”
- Third Prize: Alejandrino G. Hufana, “Three Obligations”

=== One-Act Play ===
- Special Mention:

Esteban Javellana, “Age of Heroes”
Roel T. Argonza, “El Supremo”
Marina N. Cruz, “The Red Bikini”
Domingo Nolasco, “This Land is Mine”
Felix A. Clemente, “What Might Have Been”

=== Full-Length Play ===
- First Prize: Nick Joaquin, “The Beatas”
- Second Prize: No Winner
- Third Prize: No Winner
- Special Prize: Manuel M. Martell, “Like the Days of a Hireling”

Elsa M. Coscolluela, "The Primordial Quotient"

== Filipino Division ==
=== Maikling Kwento ===
- First Prize: Fanny A. Garcia, “Alamat ng Sapang Bato”
- Second Prize: Jun Cruz Reyes, “Araw ng mga Buldozer at Dapithapon sa Buhay ni Ato”
- Third Prize: Domingo G. Landicho, “Ang Pangarap ni Isis”

=== Tula ===
- First Prize: Lamberto E. Antonio, “Sangkipil na Uhay”
- Second Prize: Teo T. Antonio, “Sa Pagtabon ng Gumuhong Bundok”
- Third Prize: No Winner

=== Dulang May Isang Yugto ===
- First Prize: Nonilon Valdeamos Queano, “Nang Pista sa Aming Bayan”
- Second Prize: Mariano Calangasan, “Ang Daigdig sa Isang Handaan”
- Third Prize: Rolando C. Bartolome, “Ang Kanal”

=== Dulang Ganap ang Haba ===
- First Prize: Nonilon Valdeamos Queano, “Alipato”
- Second Prize: No Winner
- Third Prize: No Winner
- Special Prizes: Bienvenido Noriega Jr., “Ang Artista sa Palengke”

Azucena Grajo Uranza, “Isang Saglit sa Karimlan”

== Sources ==
- "The Don Carlos Palanca Memorial Awards for Literature | Winners 1976". Archived from the original on 2009-10-22.
