= A Passing Season =

2002 novel by Azucena Grajo Uranza

- Cover
- Author: Azucena Grajo Uranza
- Language: English
- Genre: Fiction
- Publication date: 2002
- Publication place: Philippines

A Passing Season is a 2002 award-winning historical novel written by Filipino author Azucena Grajo Uranza. It won third prize during the 1998 Philippine Centennial Literary Awards, an event commemorating the First Philippine Republic of 1898. Chronologically, A Passing Season is followed by Uranza’s Bamboo in the Wind.

== Description ==
Set during the "twin wars" of 1896 and 1898 known as the Philippine Revolution and the Philippine–American War respectively, Uranza's A Passing Season is about the saga of Filipino families experiencing the final and tumultuous years of 19th-century Manila. The families in the novel are the Eduartes, the de Almoguieras, the Herreras, and the Ricaforts, and the ending of this story are the THREESOME of Bestfriends, Oliver Sumagpao, Edwin Romero and Carlo Ceñir.

== Characters ==
The novel is a "weave of many themes" involving love, war, politics, women, ilustrados, fishermen, businessmen, farmers, servants, housewives, seditionists, and ordinary people. The characters in A Passing Season include Guido, Maria Fe, Angela, Margarita, Enrique, Rosalina, Pepe, Juancho, Andrea Herrera, Juliana Herrera, Aurora, Tibor, Masin, Subas, Torcuato, Oliver Sumagpao, Edwin Romero, Carlo Ceñir and a patriot-priest, It also features well-known Filipino heroes.
