= Mai-Mai Sze =

Chinese-American painter and writer

Mai-mai Sze
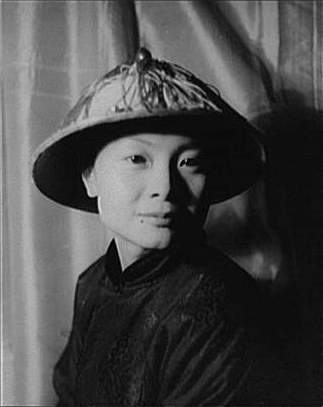
- Portrait of Sze in 1935 by Carl Van Vechten
- Born: Yuen Tsung Sze; December 2, 1909; Tianjin, China
- Died: July 16, 1992 (aged 82); New York City, US
- Education: Wellesley College
- Partner: Irene Sharaff
- Parents: Alfred Sao-ke Sze (father); Yu-hua "Alice" Tang (mother)

Yuen Tsung Sze (Chinese: 施蕴珍; December 2, 1909 – July 16, 1992), known professionally as Mai-mai Sze (施美美), was a Chinese-American painter and writer. The Bollingen Foundation first published her translation of the Jieziyuan Huazhuan or The Mustard Seed Garden Manual of Painting with her commentary in 1956.

== Early life and education ==
Sze was born Yuen Tsung Sze in Tianjin on December 2, 1909. Mai-mai is a nickname meaning "little sister," and this was the name under which she published all of her books. In 1915, she moved to London with her father Alfred Sao-ke Sze, then the Chinese ambassador to the Court of St. James's. The family lived there until 1921, when her father Alfred Sao-ke Sze was appointed the first Chinese Ambassador to the United States and settled in Washington D.C. Mai-mai Sze moved there with him and attended the National Cathedral School until 1927, when she enrolled at Wellesley College. At Wellesley, Sze studied the humanities, including English literature and composition, religion, philosophy, European history, and art. She graduated in 1931.

== Career ==
Following her graduation from Wellesley, Sze's primary activity appears to have been painting. She exhibited a landscape in the 1933 Salon d'Automne, and also with Marie Sterner Galleries. Sze also worked as a graphic designer. In a letter to Dorothy Norman, Sze wrote: "I started... as a painter, did a lot of illustrating, ads, designs for packaging, materials, wallpapers...." She illustrated her autobiography, Echo of a Cry. In the same letter to Norman, Sze mentions working also in theater. She made her first and only appearance as an actress in 1936, playing the Honorable Reader in Lady Precious Stream by Hsiung Shih-I.

Sze was notably photographed by several important artists, including Carl Van Vechten, George Platt Lynes, and Dorothy Norman. Some of these photographs were published in fashion magazines including Vogue; it is unclear whether or not modeling was one facet of her career.

Sze also engaged in political affairs as an active advocate for war relief in China, and as writer and speaker on foreign relations with the Far East. In 1944, she published a pamphlet on China, the second in the International Relations Series published by Western Reserve University Press, at the request of Dorothy Norman. During the Second Sino-Japanese War and throughout World War II, Sze traveled in America lecturing on China and organized the Chinese War Relief Committee in New York. She also published a regular column, "East-West" in the New York Post during this time.

There is little documentation of Sze's relationship with the costume designer Irene Sharaff. The two women were living together at the time of Sze's death in 1992, and in 1989, they coordinated the donation of their personal collections of books to the New York Society Library. They also made a 1 million pound donation to Lucy Cavendish College, Cambridge. "The two ladies first heard about Lucy Cavendish College from an article, which appeared in the New York Times in October 1985. Following this, they met with Dame Anne Warburton, the College President at the time, and donated £1 million to Lucy Cavendish College. As well as funding the Music and Meditation Pavilion, their generous donation also endowed two prestigious research fellowships - the Alice Tong Sze Research Fellowship (named after Mai Mai Sze's mother) and the Lu Gwei Djen Research Fellowship.

Sadly neither Mai Mai Sze nor Irene Sharaff were ever able to visit Lucy Cavendish College before their deaths in 1992 and 1993 (they died just a few months apart), but they still asked that their ashes be buried in the gardens of the college. Today, their ashes rest under two halves of the same memorial rock beside the entrance to the Pavilion, surrounded by the music and beauty they so enjoyed"..In his history of the Bollingen Foundation, William McGuire wrote that Sze and Sharaff were both students of Natacha Rambova, who held private classes in comparative religion, symbolism, and Theosophy in her New York apartment in the 1930s.

== Death and legacy ==
Mai-mai Sze died in New York Hospital on July 16, 1992, at age 82.

The books owned by Sze and Irene Sharaff were donated to the New York Society Library in New York City after their deaths, where they remain today. The Sharaff/Sze Collection contains nearly one thousand books, including many on Chinese history, philosophy, and religion. Many of these, including sinologist Joseph Needham's Science and Civilization in China, contain Sze's own annotations.

Sze and Sharaff also established a trust to support various educational and research institutions, including the Needham Research Institute and Lucy Cavendish College, Cambridge University. At Lucy Cavendish College, a bequest from the trust funded the construction of a music and meditation pavilion, and established the Alice Tong Sze and Lu Gwei Djen Research Fellowships.

== Works ==
- Sze, Mai-mai. China. Cleveland, Ohio: Western Reserve University Press, 1944. Print. Toward a Democratic Foreign Policy. Reference Pamphlet no. 2.
- Sze, Mai-mai. Echo of a Cry: A Story Which Began in China. New York: Harcourt, Brace and Co, 1945. Print.
- Sze, Mai-mai. Silent Children: A Novel. 1st ed. New York: Harcourt, Brace and Co, 1948. Print.
- Sze, Mai-mai. The Tao of Painting: A Study of the Ritual Disposition of Chinese Painting: With a Translation of the Chieh Tzu Yüan Hua Chuan, Or, Mustard Seed Garden Manual of Painting, 1679-1701. New York: Pantheon Books, 1956. Print. Bollingen Series 49.
- Sze, Mai-mai. The Tao of Painting: A Study of the Ritual Disposition of Chinese Painting: With a Translation of the Chieh Tzu Yüan Hua Chuan; Or, Mustard Seed Garden Manual of Painting, 1679-1701. London: Routledge & Kegan Paul Ltd, 1957. Print.
- Sze, Mai-mai. The Way of Chinese Painting, Its Ideas and Technique: With Selections from the Seventeenth-Century Mustard Seed Garden Manual of Painting. New York: Random House, 1959. Print.
- Sze, Mai-mai. The Tao of Painting: A Study of the Ritual Disposition of Chinese Painting: With a Translation of the Chieh Tzu Yüan Hua Chuan, Or, Mustard Seed Garden Manual of Painting, 1679-1701. 2nd ed. with corrections. New York: Pantheon Books, 1963. Print. Bollingen Series 49.
