= Pavilion by the Lake =

- 《湖边凉亭》 (Chinese)
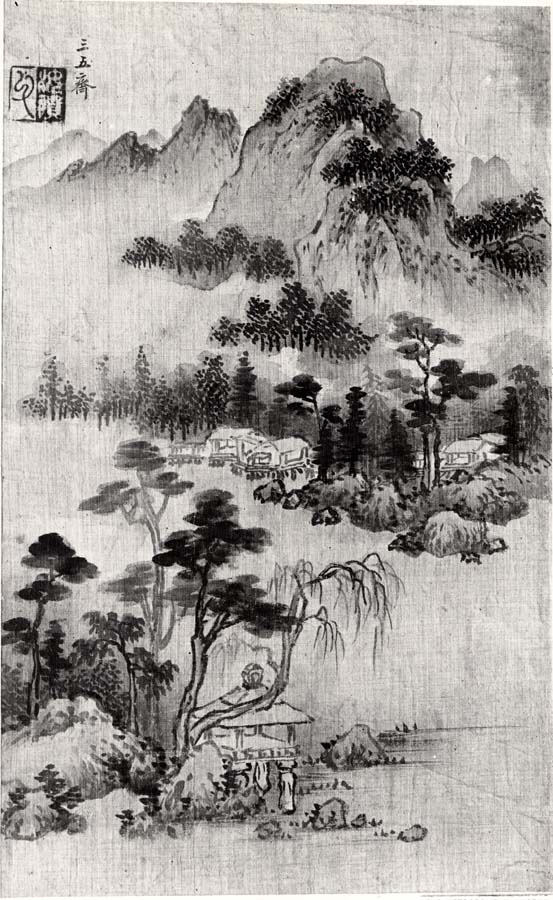
- Artist: Samoje (active during late 18th century)
- Year: Late 18th century (Joseon dynasty)
- Type: painting
- Medium: Framed painting; ink and colour on silk
- Dimensions: 45.4 cm × 27.6 cm (17.9 in × 10.9 in)
- Location: Metropolitan Museum of Art, New York
- Accession: 15.96.2

Pavilion by the Lake (Chinese: 湖边凉亭) is a painting during Korean Peninsula’s Joseon dynasty period. Created in the late 18th century AD, this painting measures 45.4 cm in height and 27.6 cm in width. This painting is created by an unknown artist whose style name is Samoje (literally, "Studio of Three-Five"). The artist, probably a professional painter from the jungin (middle people) class of Joseon dynasty cannot be ascertained due to lack of documentation. So it is difficult to confirm the identity and the given name of the artist. The composition of the "Pavilion by the Lake" were likely adapted from popular painting manuals of Ming dynasty (1368–1644) imported from China. One of the most prominent examples for those painting manuals was the Mustard Seed Garden (Chinese: 芥子園畫傳, Jieziyuan Huazhuan) manual of painting.

== Description ==
With Chinese influence, Korean Peninsula’s painting originated during the Three Kingdoms period in the form of mural painting. It eventually developed into monochrome painting or light painting. Naturalistic themes became popular subjects for Korean painting. The "Pavilion by the Lake‍", belonging to the late 18th century, was created during Korean Peninsula’s Joseon dynasty period. It might be painted by a professional painter belonging to jungin or the middle people of Joseon. This painting measures 45.4 cm in height and 27.6 cm in width. The painter has used the term Samoje (literally, "Studio of Three-Five") as his style name. But neither definite identity nor the given name of the painter has ascertained. Current view is that "Pavilion by the Lake" was probably adapted from a popular Ming dynasty painting manual imported from China, such as the famous "Mustard Seed Garden" painting manual. In 1915, the painting was donated to Metropolitan Museum of Art by Rogers foundation. The painting was exhibited at the Korean Art exhibition of Metropolitan Museum in 2006 and 2010 respectively.
