= Feast of the Innocents =

2003 novel by Azucena Grajo Uranza

- Book cover for Azucena Grajo Uranza's The Feast of Innocents.
- Author: Azucena Grajo Uranza
- Language: English
- Genre: Fiction
- Publication date: 2003
- Publication place: Philippines

The Feast of the Innocents is a 2003 English-language novel written by award-winning Filipino author Azucena Grajo Uranza. Set during the Philippines' post-People Power period, Feast of the Innocents is chronologically the fourth part of Uranza’s literary saga, after the Women of Tammuz.
