= Twice Blessed =

1992 novel by Ninotchka Rosca

- Book cover for Ninotchka Rosca's Twice Blessed.
- Author: Ninotchka Rosca
- Language: English
- Genre: Fiction
- Publisher: Norton
- Publication date: 1992
- Publication place: United States
- Media type: Print
- Pages: 269
- ISBN: 0-393-03091-1
- Preceded by: State of War
- Followed by: Jose Maria Sison: at home in the world : portrait of a revolutionary

Twice Blessed, also known as Twice Blessed: A Novel, is a 1992 novel written by Filipino author Ninotchka Rosca. It won the 1993 American Book Award for “excellence in literature”. It is one of Rosca’s novels that recreated the diversity of Filipino culture (the other was State of War). Apart from tracing back Philippine History, Rosca also portrayed contemporary Philippine politics, delicate events, and cultural preferences through the novel.

== Description ==
Twice Blessed was described as a “comic parable” concerned about the Philippines’ status, at the time of writing, as “a nation struggling to be born.” It was published when Ferdinand and Imelda Marcos were exiled in Hawaii, USA. In this satirical novel, Rosca derided the Marcoses and exposed how some moneyed Filipino warlords preserve their status and power through clan alliances, corruption, and “fuel and favors” (i.e. bribery, sexual favors, and the like) generally known as gasolina in the vernacular meaning “gasoline” to “keep things running” as planned.

== Characters ==
The main characters in Twice Blessed are Hector Basbas, Katerina Basbas, and Teresa Tiklopluhod (her surname literally meant “fold and kneel” in Tagalog). Hector and Katerina are twins having an incestuous relationship. Katerina had a shoe collection resulting from her experiences of “humiliations” during childhood. Teresa Tiklopluhod is a provincial governor’s daughter who became a confidante of Katerina Basbas.

== Description ==
Through political tactics and societal manoeuvres, Hector and Katerina Basbas became dominant figures in the Philippines. When Hector won the Presidential elections by “buying”, the incumbent refused to relinquish the position. Hector needed to provide more “fuel” to keep things moving, a plan that required Katerina’s help, covert assistance from the United States and “strong-arm” persuasive manoeuvring. Together with Katerina, Hector was aiming to convert the Philippine democratic system into a dynastic reign of monarchs.

== Awards ==
In 1993 the Before Columbus Foundation granted her the American Book Award, for excellence in literature, for her Twice Blessed. The Before Columbus Foundation seeks to recognize outstanding literary achievement by contemporary American authors, without restriction to race, sex, ethnic background, or genre.

== Author ==
Ninotchka Rosca (born in the Philippines in 1946) is a Filipina feminist, author, journalist and human rights activist. Ninotchka Rosca is described as, "one of the major players in the saga of Filipina American writers". During the political instability during Ferdinand Marcos's rule she was arrested and held at a detention center for six months. She then spent sometime in exile in America. Much of her work is taken from her experiences during her imprisonment. Her short stories have been included in several collections including, the 1986 Best 100 Short Stories in the U.S. compiled by Raymond Carver and the Missouri Review Anthology. She went on to write Jose Maria Sison: At Home in the World, "To read Ninotchka Rosca's [latest is] not just to discover the controversial man, but to learn the political and economic history of the Philippines."

== Bibliography ==
Notes

References

- Davis, Rocío G. (1999). "Postcolonial Visions and Immigrant Longings: Ninotchka Rosca's Versions of the Philippines". World Literature Today. 73 (1): 62–70. doi:10.2307/40154476. ISSN 0196-3570. JSTOR 40154476. Archived from the original on 2011-06-04 – via Questia.
- Manuel, Dolores de (Spring 2004). "Decolonizing Bodies, Reinscribing Souls in the Fiction of Ninotchka Rosca and Linda Ty-Casper". MELUS. 29 (1): 99–118. doi:10.2307/4141797. ISSN 0163-755X. JSTOR 4141797.
- Rosca, Ninotchka (1992). Twice blessed: a novel (1992 ed.). Norton. ISBN 0-393-03091-1. - Total pages: 269
- Seed, David (2009). A Companion to Twentieth-Century United States Fiction (2009 ed.). John Wiley and Sons. ISBN 978-1-4051-4691-3. - Total pages: 608
