= Irene Sharaff =

American costume designer

- Born: January 23, 1910; Boston, Massachusetts, U.S.
- Died: August 16, 1993 (aged 83); New York City, U.S.
- Education: New York School of Fine and Applied Arts; Académie de la Grande Chaumière
- Partner: Mai-Mai Sze

Irene Sharaff (January 23, 1910 – August 16, 1993) was an American costume designer for stage and screen. Her accolades include five Academy Awards and a Tony Award. Sharaff is universally recognized as one of the greatest costume designers of all time.

== Background ==
Sharaff was born in Boston to parents of Armenian descent. She studied at the New York School of Fine and Applied Arts, the Art Students League of New York, and the Académie de la Grande Chaumière in Paris.

== Career ==
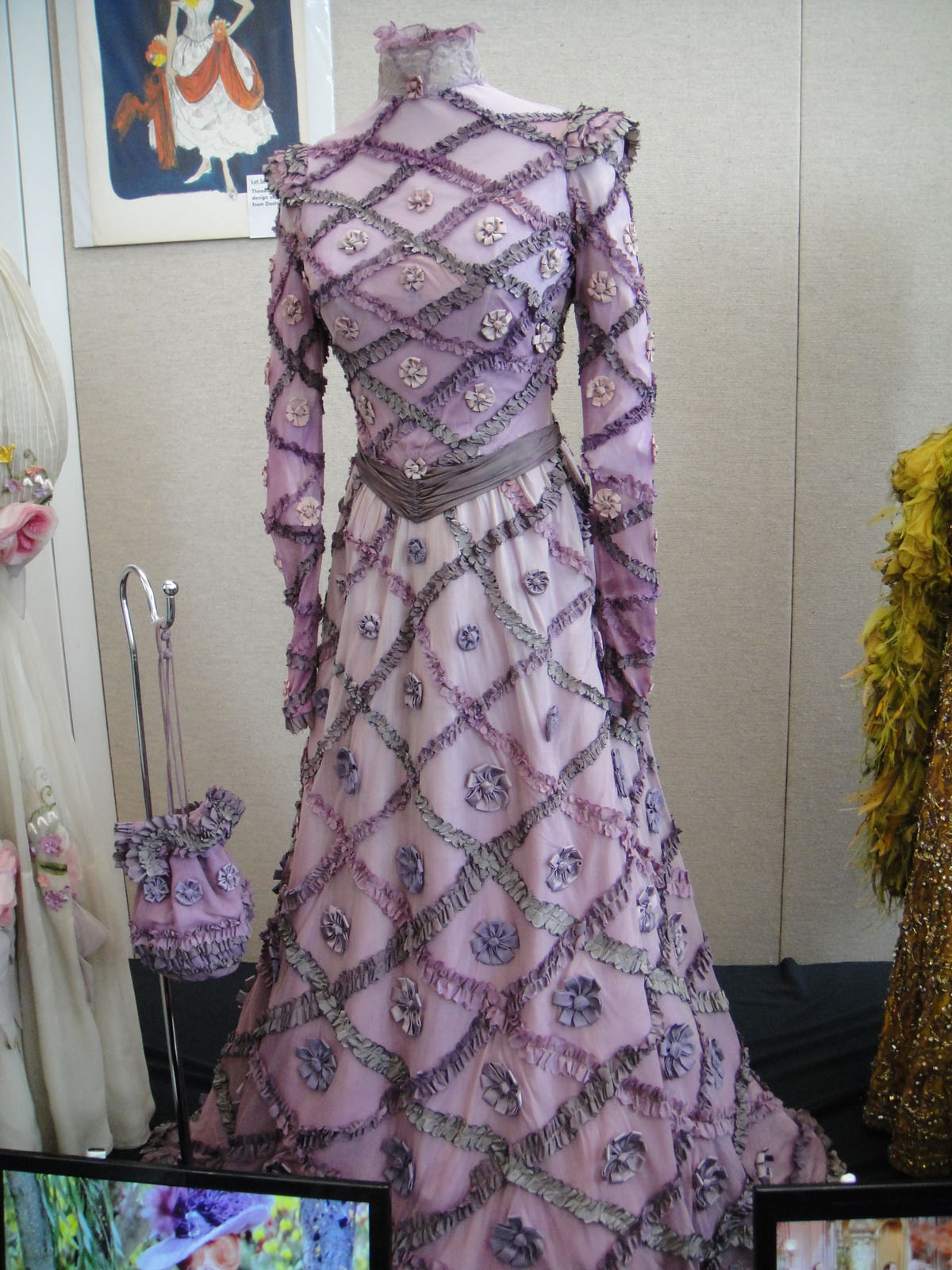
Design for Barbra Streisand in Hello, Dolly! (1969)

After working as a fashion illustrator in her youth, Sharaff turned to set and costume design. In 1928, she was recommended by actress Eva Le Gallienne to Aline Bernstein who was art director at the Civic Repertory Theatre, who hired her as an unpaid apprentice. Her debut production was the 1931 Broadway production of Alice in Wonderland, starring Le Gallienne, with Sharaff designing the entire show, including scenery and costumes. Her use of silks from Thailand for The King and I (1951) created a trend in fashion and interior decoration.

Sharaff's work was featured in the movies West Side Story (Academy Award, 1961), Cleopatra (Academy Award, 1963), Meet Me in St. Louis, Hello, Dolly!, Mommie Dearest, The Other Side of Midnight, Who's Afraid of Virginia Woolf? (Academy Award, 1966), Guys and Dolls, The Best Years of Our Lives, The King and I (Academy Award, 1956), An American in Paris (Academy Award, 1951), Funny Girl and Porgy and Bess.

She also designed sets and costumes for American Ballet Theatre, the New York City Ballet, and the Ballet Russe de Monte Carlo, and contributed illustrations to fashion magazine's such as Vogue and Harper's Bazaar. Among her Broadway design credits are Idiot's Delight, Lady in the Dark, As Thousands Cheer, A Tree Grows in Brooklyn, Virginia, Flower Drum Song, and Jerome Robbins' Broadway.

The TDF/Irene Sharaff Lifetime Achievement Award was named for Sharaff. She was its first recipient in 1993. The award is now bestowed annually to a costume designer who, over the course of his or her career, has achieved great distinction and mastery of the art in theatre, film, opera or dance.

== Death ==
Sharaff died in New York City of congestive heart failure, complicated by emphysema, at the age of 83. She bequeathed her collection of books, along with that of her partner, Mai-Mai Sze, to the New York Society Library.

== Filmography ==
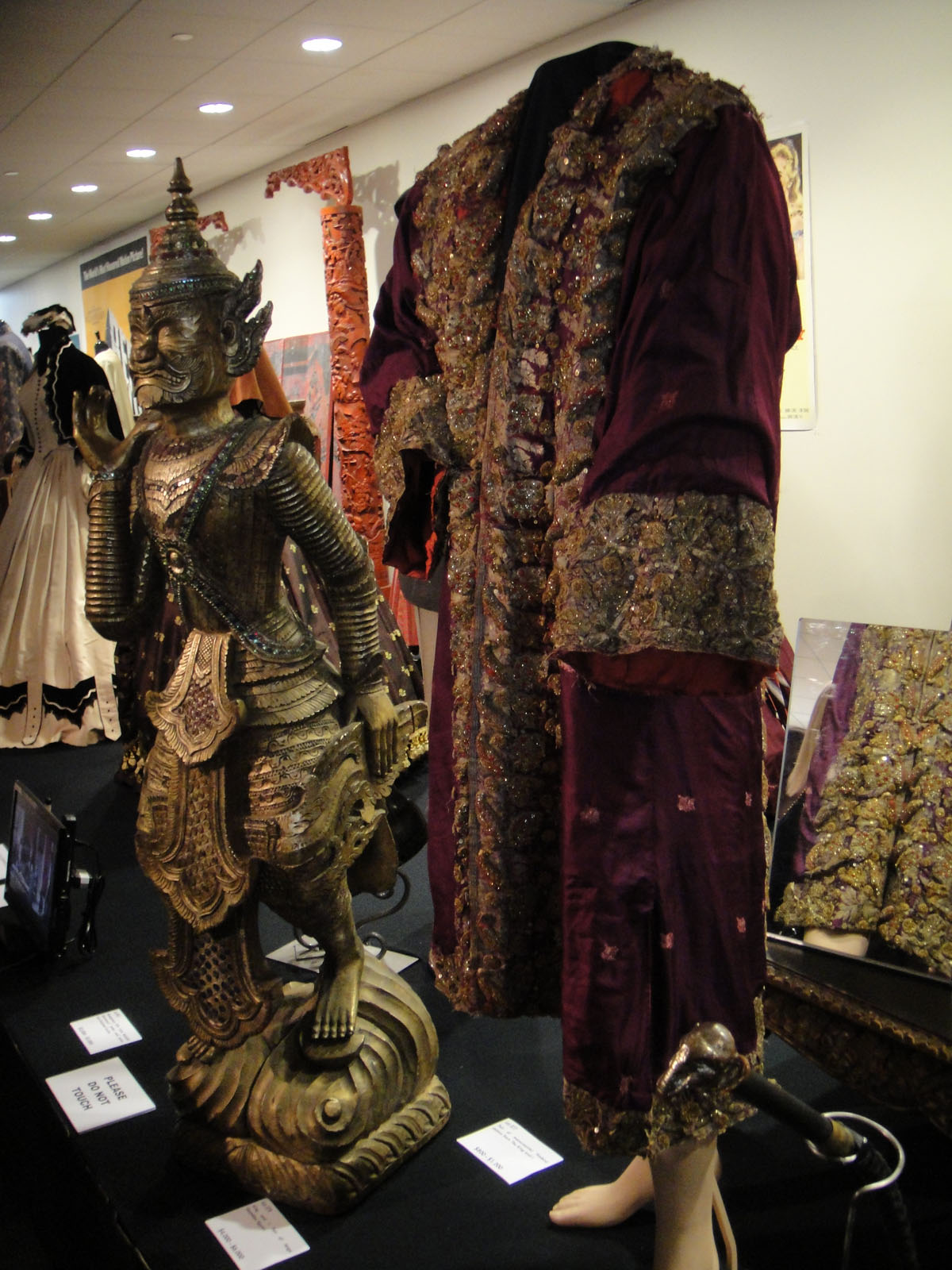
Royal robe designed for Yul Brynner in The King and I, for which Sharaff won an Oscar

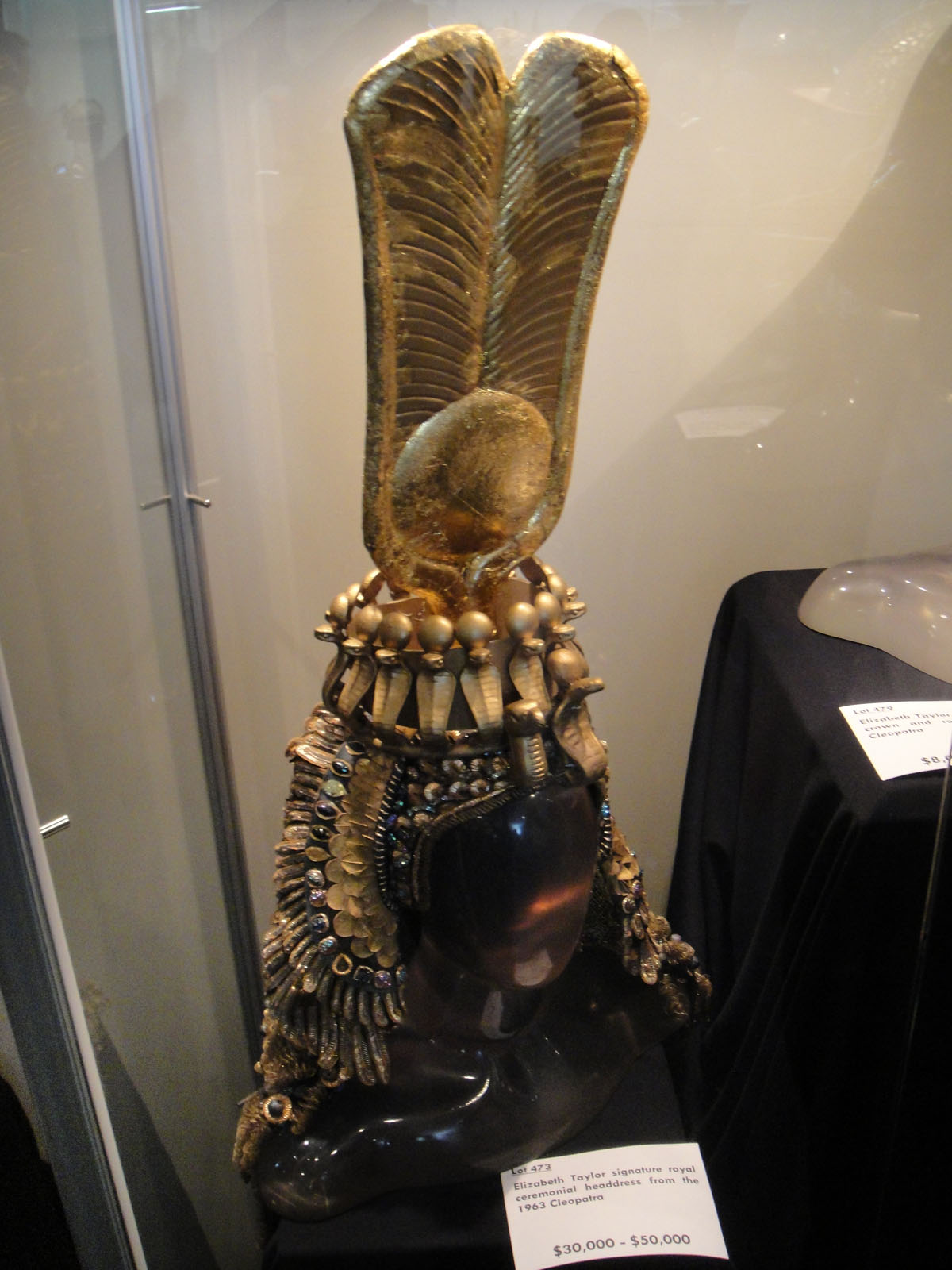
Headdress for Elizabeth Taylor in Cleopatra, which won another Oscar for Sharaff

- 1981 Mommie Dearest
- 1977 The Other Side of Midnight
- 1970 The Great White Hope
- 1969 Hello, Dolly!
- 1969 Justine
- 1968 Funny Girl
- 1967 The Taming of the Shrew
- 1967 A Happening in Central Park (TV Special)
- 1966 Who's Afraid of Virginia Woolf?
- 1965 The Sandpiper
- 1963 Cleopatra
- 1961 Flower Drum Song
- 1961 West Side Story
- 1960 Can-Can
- 1959 Porgy and Bess
- 1956 The King and I
- 1955 Guys and Dolls
- 1954 A Star Is Born (Costume and Production Designer)
- 1954 Brigadoon
- 1953 Call Me Madam
- 1951 The Guy Who Came Back
- 1951 An American in Paris
- 1950 Key to the City
- 1949 In the Good Old Summertime
- 1948 Every Girl Should Be Married
- 1948 A Song Is Born
- 1947 The Unfinished Dance
- 1947 The Romance of Rosy Ridge
- 1947 The Hucksters
- 1947 The Secret Life of Walter Mitty
- 1947 Song of the Thin Man
- 1947 The Arnelo Affair
- 1947 The Beginning or the End
- 1947 If Winter Comes
- 1947 Living in a Big Way
- 1947 The Bishop's Wife
- 1946 Two Sisters from Boston
- 1946 The Secret Heart
- 1946 Courage of Lassie
- 1946 The Dark Mirror
- 1946 Love Laughs at Andy Hardy
- 1946 Ziegfeld Follies (Production Designer; uncredited)
- 1946 Easy to Wed
- 1946 The Green Years
- 1946 The Hoodlum Saint
- 1946 The Best Years of Our Lives
- 1945 Twice Blessed
- 1945 The Valley of Decision
- 1945 The Picture of Dorian Gray
- 1945 Adventure
- 1945 The Hidden Eye
- 1945 Her Highness and the Bellboy
- 1944 Meet Me in St. Louis
- 1944 The Thin Man Goes Home
- 1944 Andy Hardy's Blonde Trouble
- 1944 Gentle Annie
- 1944 Broadway Rhythm
- 1943 Swing Shift Maisie
- 1943 A Stranger in Town
- 1943 I Dood It
- 1943 Madame Curie
- 1943 The Human Comedy
- 1941 The Devil and Miss Jones
- 1941 You'll Never Get Rich
- 1939 Eternally Yours
- 1938 Vivacious Lady

== Awards and nominations ==
Award	Year (Note: Indicates the year of ceremony. Each year is linked to the article about the awards held that year, wherever possible.)	Category	Work	Result	Ref.
Academy Awards	1952	Best Costume Design – Color	An American in Paris	Won	
Academy Awards	1954	Best Costume Design – Color	Call Me Madam	Nominated	
Academy Awards	1955	Best Costume Design – Color	Brigadoon	Nominated	
Academy Awards	1955	Best Art Direction – Color	A Star Is Born	Nominated	
Academy Awards	1955	Best Costume Design – Color	A Star Is Born	Nominated	
Academy Awards	1956	Best Costume Design – Color	Guys and Dolls	Nominated	
Academy Awards	1957	Best Costume Design – Color	The King and I	Won	
Academy Awards	1960	Best Costume Design – Color	Porgy and Bess	Nominated	
Academy Awards	1961	Best Costume Design – Color	Can-Can	Nominated	
Academy Awards	1962	Best Costume Design – Color	West Side Story	Won	
Academy Awards	1962	Best Costume Design – Color	Flower Drum Song	Nominated	
Academy Awards	1964	Best Costume Design – Color	Cleopatra	Won	
Academy Awards	1967	Best Costume Design – Black-and-White	Who's Afraid of Virginia Woolf?	Won	
Academy Awards	1968	Best Costume Design	The Taming of the Shrew	Nominated	
Academy Awards	1970	Best Costume Design	Hello, Dolly!	Nominated	
Academy Awards	1978	Best Costume Design	The Other Side of Midnight	Nominated	
British Academy Film Awards	1970	Best Costume Design	Funny Girl	Nominated	
Tony Awards	1952	Best Costume Design	The King and I	Won	
Tony Awards	1957	Best Costume Design	Candide / Happy Hunting / Shangri-La / Small War on Murray Hill	Nominated (Note: According to the Tonys database, Sharaff received a single joint nomination for four different productions.)	
Tony Awards	1958	Best Costume Design	West Side Story	Nominated	
Tony Awards	1959	Best Costume Design	Flower Drum Song	Nominated	
Tony Awards	1964	Best Costume Design	The Girl Who Came to Supper	Nominated	
Tony Awards	1966	Best Costume Design	Sweet Charity	Nominated	
Tony Awards	1968	Best Costume Design	Hallelujah, Baby!	Nominated	

Other recognition

- Sharaff was the first recipient of the TDF/Irene Sharaff Lifetime Achievement Award in 1993, which was named in her honor.
- Sharaff was inducted into the American Theater Hall of Fame in 1997.
- Sharaff was inducted into the Costume Designers Guild Hall of Fame in 1999.

== Bibliography ==
- Sharaff, Irene. Broadway and Hollywood: Costumes Designed by Irene Sharaff, Van Nostrand Reinhold Co (1976)
