= Paz Márquez-Benítez =

Filipino writer (1894–1983)

Paz Marquez-Benítez
- Born: March 3, 1894; Lucena, Tayabas, Captaincy General of the Philippines
- Died: November 10, 1983 (aged 89); Manila, Philippines
- Resting place: Loyola Memorial Park Marikina, Philippines
- Education: University of the Philippines, Manila; Philippine Normal School
- Occupation: Writer

Paz Márquez-Benítez (March 3, 1894 – November 10, 1983) was a Filipino short-story writer, educator and editor. She is best known for writing "Dead Stars", considered the first modern Philippine short story in English. Throughout her career, she taught at the University of the Philippines, where she led a short-story writing course that influenced numerous prominent Filipino writers. Additionally, she was involved in founding educational publications and institutions, including the Philippine Women's University.

During her career as a writer, Marquez-Benitez wrote short stories critical of American Imperialism. She is most known by her short story Dead Stars (1925) in which the two main characters are displayed as allegories to American imperialism in order to portray the slow decay of Philippine heritage. Her only other known published work is A Night in the Hills (1925). Even though she had only two published works her writings would be regarded as the first steps of Philippine literature moving into the mainstream.

Marquez-Benitez remains as a prominent influence on Philippine literature through not only her writing but her impact as an educator and editor. She and her husband's establishment of educational magazines, schools, and her contributions to the development of creative short story writing courses within the Philippines is believed to have inspired generations of Filipino writers.

== Life ==
=== Early years ===
Paz Marquez-Benitez was born on March 3, 1894, in then municipality Lucena, Tayabas (now Quezon), Philippines. Born into the prominent Marquez family of Quezon province her parents were well educated. Her father, Gregorio Marquez was educated at the Ateneo de Manila and mother, Maria Jurado was educated at the Escuela Municipal. Both of Paz's parents entered into careers in education and become teachers, leading to Paz's admiration and respect for the educating profession.

Aged six, Márquez-Benítez began her educational career and after three years at the age of nine she was enrolled into high school. She attended the Tayabas Highschool now, Quezon National High School where she was praised by her principal for her academic achievements in English.

During Paz's time at the Normal School in Manila, she like many other Filipinos during the early 1900s, was introduced to American culture. This introduction to American culture began in 1910 at the age of sixteen when Márquez-Benítez took to basketball and eventually became the team captain. American culture continued to envelop around her in 1912, at the age of eighteen, when she was introduced to, and participated in, a beauty contest where she was chosen as the Manila Carnival Queen of 1912 and thus graced the cover of the Renacimiento Filipino.

=== Career ===
Four years after graduating from the University of the Philippines in Manila in 1916, Márquez-Benítez became a teacher in the English Department at her alma mater. While teaching at the University of the Philippines, Márquez-Benítez went on to develop and teach a course in short story writing for 35 years until she retired in 1951. Throughout her teaching career, Márquez-Benítez had become known as an influential figure to many prominent Filipino writers in the English language, such as Francisco Arcellena, Bienvenido N. Santo, Paz Latorena, Loreto Paras Sulit, Edna Zapanta Manlapaz, and Arturo B. Rotor, all of whom were taught by Márquez-Benítez at the University of the Philippines. The annually held Marquez-Benitez Lectures in the Philippines continue to honor her memory by focusing on the contribution of Filipina writers to Philippine Literature in the English language.

As a professor, Márquez-Benítez used her writing course as an opportunity to write her first major short story in 1925 titled Dead Stars which was published in the Philippine Herald. Dead Stars would later become critically acclaimed within Philippine literature and would be cited as a source of inspiration to many Filipino writers. Though Márquez-Benítez was well known for her success with Dead Stars, it would not be her only work as she would continue to release short stories such as A Night in the Hills and Stepping Stones although these works were not received as well as Dead Stars.

For Marquez-Benitez, writing was a lifelong occupation and in 1918, outside of her career in teaching, Márquez-Benítez and her husband Francisco Benitez became founders of the Philippine Educational Magazine in which they produced educational magazines for teachers. Francisco Benitez was the editor of the journal until his death in June 1951 where soon afterward, Márquez-Benítez retired from her career as an educator and took his place as editor of the journal. In 1919, she also went on to found the "Woman's Home Journal," the first women's magazine in the country. Also in the same year, she and six other prominent members of Manila's social elites, namely, Clara Aragon, Concepcion Aragon, Francisca Tirona Benitez, Carolina Ocampo Palma, Mercedes Rivera, and her older sister, Socorro Marquez Zaballero founded the Philippine Women's College now Philippine Women's University.

=== Marriage and family ===
In December 1914, two years after graduation, she married Francisco Benitez (June 1, 1887 – June 30, 1951), a dean of the University of the Philippines, and the co-founder of the Philippine Educational Magazine. The two went on to have four children together. In 1951, Francisco Benitez died of a heart attack.

== Education ==
Márquez-Benítez being part of the elite class of the Philippines and having two educated parents was born into a family in which education was highly expected. She began her educational career at the age of six where she attended in Lucena West 1 Elementary School, first learned English. At the age of thirteen, Márquez-Benítez continued to progress and attend high school at the Tayabas High School now, Quezon National High School where she later graduated in the year 1912. During her early years in education she was deemed a studious and excellent student which would lead her onto post secondary education. After graduating from high school, Márquez-Benítez began her post secondary education at the Normal School in Manila in which she lived for two years and learned about American culture and found her interest in writing. After spending two years at the Normal School in Manila, In 1914, Márquez-Benítez finished her education as part of the first class to go through the newly established University of the Philippines, a school in which she later became a professor, in which she graduated with a B.A. in Liberal Arts.

== Works ==
- Dead Stars (1925)
- A Night in the Hills (1925)

== See also ==
- Cecilia Manguerra Brainard
- PAWWA
- Ninotchka Rosca
- Lualhati Bautista
- Sophia Romero
