= Woman with Horns =

Woman With Horns is a short story written by Filipino writer Cecilia Manguerra Brainard. The story was first published in Focus Philippines in 1984 and is part of the author's first short story collection, Woman With Horns and Other Stories (New Day Publishers, 1987). The US edition of Woman With Horns and Other Stories was published in 2020 by PALH/Philippine American Literary House. The title refers to a fictional character named Agustina Macaraig, an Ubecan widow, rumored to have horns. Brainard's character was inspired by fanciful folklore from Cebu, Philippines, where she grew up in and which inspired her to create the setting of many of her stories - Ubec, which is Cebu backwards.

== Summary ==
The story is set in 1903 a year after the tumultuous Philippine–American War. America was busy sending American administrators to their newly acquired colony in the Pacific. One of those who went to the "Islands" and who ended up in Ubec was a New York City doctor and widower, Gerald McAllister. As the Public Health Director of Ubec, he carries on with his duties of establishing a vaccination program to stop a cholera epidemic. His initial meeting of the beautiful and sensual widow, Agustina Macaraig, disturbs and irritates the doctor. It is his assistant, Dr. Jaime Laurel, who reminds him that life is more than work: "Friend, you don't know how to enjoy life. Look at the sun turning red, getting ready to set spectacularly. It is a wonderful afternoon, you walk with a friend, you talk about beautiful women, about life..."

It is Agustina Macaraig who eventually teaches Gerald McAllister to love and live once more.

== See also ==
Philippine short story writers:

- Lualhati Bautista
- Jose Dalisay, Jr.
- Gilda Cordero-Fernando
- N.V.M. Gonzalez
- Bienvenido N. Santos
- Alfred Yuson

== Sources ==
- Beltran, Marie G. "Woman With Horns and Other Concerns." Filipinas (May 1995_: 29, 56.
- Casper, Leonard. Sunsurfers Seen from Afar: Critical Essays 1991-1996. Metro Manila, Philippines: Anvil, 1996
- Pantoja, Cristina (1994), Filipino Woman Writing: Home and Exile in the Autobiographical Narratives of Ten Writers, Quezon City: Ateneo de Manila University Press, ISBN 9715501133
