= Sophia Romero =

Filipino writer

Sophia G. Romero is a Filipino writer based in Brooklyn, New York. She is the author of the novel, Always Hiding, written in Philippine English. The 224-paged book was published by William Morrow and Company on April 1, 1998.

== See also ==
- Ninotchka Rosca
- Paz Márquez-Benítez
- Lualhati Bautista
