= Always Hiding =

1998 novel by Sophia Romero

- Author: Sophia Romero
- Language: English
- Genre: Novel
- Publisher: William Morrow and Company
- Publication date: 1998
- Publication place: Philippines
- Media type: Print (hardback & paperback)
- Pages: 272
- ISBN: 0-688-15632-0

Always Hiding is a novel written by Filipino-American novelist Sophia Romero. Published by the William Morrow and Company in March/April 1998, the 272-page English-language novel's title was the translation of the Tagalog-language phrase "Tago nang tago". Abbreviated as "TNT", the phrase is a moniker for "an undocumented immigrant in the United States" who always has to hide and be cautious in his/her movements so as not to be found and caught by immigration authorities.

== Plot ==
The main protagonist in Romero's novel is Violetta Rosario "Viola" Dananay. Viola narrates her life in the Philippines and her eventual move to the United States. Viola was conceived before the marriage of her parents who belong to Manila's socialite class. Viola grew up in Manila during the regime of former Philippine president Ferdinand Marcos. Her life was complicated by her quarrelsome parents. One of the main reasons for the disagreements between Viola's parents was her father's reputation as a womanizer and philanderer. Viola's father left the family to live with a pregnant mistress. Viola's mother, Ludy, left for the United States to escape the indiscretions of her husband, leaving Viola behind. Upon arrival in America, Viola's mother became an undocumented immigrant working as a maid in New York City. After the fall of the Marcos’, Viola's father was implicated in charges of corruption committed by the Marcos government. Viola's father decided to send Viola, already a teenager, to the United States to live with her mother. Viola obeyed her father but with a "secret agenda": to return to the Philippines together with her mother.

== Analysis ==
According to Publishers Weekly the female character and narrator Viola felt inferior and “morally rudderless”, without direction because of her physical features, comparing herself from the Caucasian features of the Europeans. She was a teenage protagonist that “never seems to grow up” or mature, self-centered, and a person who suffered from “shallow self-dramatizations”. Booklist described Viola as a young woman focused on her own feelings of recklessness and abandonment, and "couched" or stuck in using "stolen" American phrases but with a firm grip of Filipino values. Although “smoothly but predictably written” and “with blatant symbolism”, the author of Always Hiding was not able to “fully exploit her plot’s full potential resonance”. One particular example was that Romero was able to present the evident parallels between the political and personal circumstances that ruined Viola's family, as well as the situations that divided the Philippines, but Romero was not able to utilize such conditions in order to make the story line reverberate further. Thus, Romero (a Filipino American) was not able to reveal enough of the Filipino-American experience or the contributions of the Filipino immigrant to the history of the United States. Romero was also not able to provide Viola, the character, with the “dignity” of an “unsympathetic heroine”. Despite this literary criticism, the Library Journal described Always Hiding as a novel "about family, love, honor, and modern Filipino life” in the Philippines and in the United States. According to Booklist, there were abrupt changes in the direction of the plot and the dialogue between the characters reflects the "tumultuous feelings" of the young heroine, but the author was able to maintain her emotional closeness to the reader. The novel brings “sparkling humor and fresh perspective” and a portrayal of “dangerous situations” that reveals the strength and potency of the characters, not their fear and apprehension.

== See also ==
- America Is in the Heart
