= Alfred Sao-ke Sze =

Chinese politician and diplomat

- 施肇基
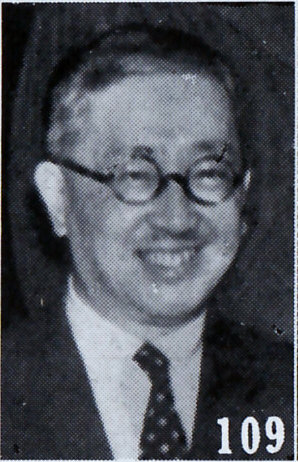
- Alfred Sao-ke Sze as pictured in The Most Recent Biographies of Chinese Dignitaries

Chinese Ambassador to the United States
- In office 1933–1936
- Preceded by: Yan Huiqing
- Succeeded by: Wang Zhengting
- In office 1920–1929
- Preceded by: Wellington Koo
- Succeeded by: Wu Chaoshu
- In office 1911–1912
- Preceded by: Zhang Yintang
- Succeeded by: Zhang Yintang

Chinese Ambassador to the United Kingdom
- In office 22 January 1929 – 23 October 1929
- Preceded by: Chen Wei-cheng
- Succeeded by: Guo Taiqi
- In office 20 June 1914 – 11 December 1914
- Preceded by: Lew Yuk Lin
- Succeeded by: Wellington Koo

Personal details
- Born: 10 April 1877 Jiangsu, China
- Died: 3 January 1958 (aged 80) Washington, D.C., US
- Spouse: Tang Yu-hua
- Children: Mai-Mai Sze; Szeming Sze
- Education: Cornell University (PhD)

Alfred Sao-ke Sze (Chinese: 施肇基; pinyin: Shī Zhàojī; Wade–Giles: Shih Chao-chi; 1877–1958) was a Chinese politician and diplomat.

== Early life ==
Sze was born on April 10, 1877, in Jiangsu. In 1892, Sze moved to Washington, D.C., with his father, who was an attaché of the Chinese legation to the United States. Sze graduated from Central High School in 1897. He then became the first Chinese student to graduate from Cornell University in 1901. He returned to China in October 1902 to work for the Peking Government.

== Career ==
Sze served successively in the Ministry of Posts and Communications, the Jilin provincial government and the Foreign Ministry. In 1905, Sze was part of the Chinese delegation which visited a number of countries to study constitutionalism. In 1908–1910, Sze worked in Jilin, during which time he dealt with the repercussions of the attempted assassination of Itō Hirobumi. In 1911 he was appointed Minister to the United States, Spain, and Peru, but the eruption of the Xinhai Revolution and overthrow of the Qing government intervened and prevented his travel.

Under the Republic of China, Sze served briefly as Transport and Communications Minister and Finance Minister. From 1914 to 1920 he was China's minister to the United Kingdom, and in 1919 he was part of the Chinese delegation to the Paris Peace Conference.

Sze, along with Foreign Minister W. W. Yen, C. T. Wang and Wellington Koo, was part of a Chinese delegation which traveled to the United States in the fall of 1921 to negotiate with the U.S. to impose a limitation of armaments on Japan and to de-escalate tensions over Japan's aggressive, expansionist activities in Shandong.

From 1921 to 1929, Sze was head of the Chinese legation to the U.S., representing the Peking Government and securing U.S. support to contain Japanese aggression in northern China. In January 1923, President Li Yuanhong nominated Sze for the office of foreign minister, but of all the Cabinet nominations, Sze's alone was rejected by the legislature. However, Sze served briefly as acting foreign minister until the new appointee was agreed. In November 1928, Sze was again appointed minister to Britain and delegate to the League of Nations. He was replaced in the legation to the U.S. by C.C. Wu.

In 1931, he was tapped as foreign minister again, but declined. At the time, he was actively representing the Republic of China at the League of Nations, denouncing Japanese military aggression in Manchuria and demanding the League's intervention. He warned the League that if it failed to act, China would have no choice but to re-arm. The League failed to act, so in December 1931, he offered his resignation. His offer was declined, and he remained at his post.

In January 1933, he was designated minister to the United States once again. He presented his credentials in February 1933. In July 1935, after the United States and the Republic of China agreed to raise their diplomatic missions from legations to embassies, Sze became the first Chinese ambassador to the United States. He was succeeded by C.T. Wang in 1937.

After the Japanese attack on Pearl Harbor, Sze worked on obtaining arms from the United States in his role as vice-chair of the China Defense Supplies Commission.

Sze was a founding member of the World Bank and was a member of the Advisory Council of the World Bank from 1947 to 1950.

== Personal life ==
Sze married Yu-hua "Alice" Tang. Tang's mother had been a lady in waiting to the Empress Dowager Cixi, her uncle was Prime Minister Tang Shaoyi, and her cousin Tang Pao-yu was married to Wellington Koo. With her marriage, she became better known in the American and British press as 'Madame Sze'.

Sze's elder brother, Shi Sao (aka Chao) Tseng (施肇曾; pinyin: Shī Zhàozēng), born 1868, was also a prominent official and served as a diplomat in the U.S. from 1893 to 1897. Upon returning to China, Shi Sao held several senior railway posts, including Director-General of Lunghai Railways from 1913 to 1922. Sze's younger brother, S.C. Thomas Sze, also attended Cornell (graduated in 1905) and was later a director of the Chinese railroads. The chair of the Sibley School of Engineering at Cornell is named after S.C. Thomas Sze. Through his son Morgan, S.C. Thomas Sze is also the paternal grandfather of poet Arthur Sze.

Alfred Sze had two sons and four daughters. Szeming Sze was the medical director of the United Nations from 1955 to 1968. Deson C. Sze was a banker and also served as a private secretary to T.V. Soong. Mai-mai Sze was an accomplished painter, author, and model. Julia Sze-Bailey and Alice Wang lived in Manhattan and Boston, respectively.

Sze died on January 3, 1958, at the age of 80.

Diplomatic posts
Preceded by Zhang Yintang	Chinese Ambassador to the United States; 1911–1912	Succeeded by Zhang Yintang
Preceded by V. K. Wellington Koo	Chinese Ambassador to the United States; 1920–1929	Succeeded by Wu Chaoshu
Preceded by Yan Huiqing	Chinese Ambassador to the United States; 1933–1936	Succeeded by Wang Zhengting
