= Zhang Yintang =

Chinese diplomat (1864–1937)

Chinese Ambassador to the United States
- In office August 12, 1909 – October 25, 1911
- Preceded by: Wu Tingfang
- Succeeded by: Alfred Sao-ke Sze

Personal details
- Born: 1864
- Died: 1937

Zhang Yintang (Chinese: 張蔭棠; pinyin: Zhāng Yīntáng; 1864–1935), courtesy name Chaobi (Chinese: 朝弼), was a Chinese diplomat of the Qing era and of the Republic of China who served as Chinese Ambassador to the United States (also accredited to Peru and Spain from 1909 to 1911.
