= State of War (novel) =

Book by Ninotchka Rosca

- Book cover for Ninotchka Rosca's State of War.
- Author: Ninotchka Rosca
- Language: English
- Genre: Fiction
- Publisher: 1988 ed - W.W. Norton; 1990 ed - Simon & Schuster
- Publication date: 1988
- Publication place: United States
- Media type: Print
- Pages: 382
- ISBN: 0-393-02544-6
- Followed by: Twice Blessed

State of War, also known as State of War: A Novel, is the first novel written in 1988 by American Book Award recipient and Filipino author Ninotchka Rosca. It was described as a political novel that recreated the diverse culture of the Philippines through the presentation of an allegorical Philippine history.

== Characters ==
The main characters of this work of fiction by Rosca are Eliza Hansen, Adrian Banyaga, Anna Villaverde, and Colonel Amor. The three youths – Hansen, Banyaga, and Villaverde – represented three “faces of Manila”. Hansen is a vendor of "special favors" catering to politicians. Banyaga is a son of a prominent and well-connected family. Villaverde was a dissident who had recently been tortured. The ancestry of the three is a mixture of ethnic Filipino, Malaysian, Chinese and Caucasian origins. Hansen was also playing the role of "matchmaker" between Banyaga and Villaverde Colonel Amor is Villaverde's interrogator, the lover and admirer of Hansen, and the seeker of Banyaga's political connections.

== Plot ==
Hansen, Banyaga, and Villaverde went to an island known as the Island of K in the Philippines to participate in a festival. Villaverde got in touch with radicals planning to activate explosives during the festival in order to assassinate The Commander, a name used as an indirect reference to Ferdinand Marcos. The assassination attempt that would end Marcos's presidency and dictatorship failed.

== Author ==
Ninotchka Rosca (born in the Philippines in 1946) is a Filipina feminist, author, journalist and human rights activist. Ninotchka Rosca is described as, "one of the major players in the saga of Filipina American writers". During the political instability during Ferdinand Marcos's rule, she was arrested and held at a detention center for six months. She then spent sometime in exile in America. Much of her work is taken from her experiences during her imprisonment. Her short stories have been included in several collections including, the 1986 Best 100 Short Stories in the U.S. compiled by Raymond Carver and the Missouri Review Anthology. Her 1993 book Twice Blessed won the American Book Award.

== Background ==
The Philippine festival referred to in Rosca's State of War have similarities with the yearly "Mardi Gras" held on Panay Island. However, the festival was used by Rosca as a literary instrument to present the "revolutionary theme" of the novel.

Rosca's State of War was also a narrative description of the effects of colonialism on the Filipinos' national identity. State of war shows women continuing their struggle in years of colonization against generations of, "rape, violence, and oppresion." State of War is written with nostalgia for the pre-contact days of a strong female presence in Filipino society. Other reviews also reveal that Rosca uses an, "intricate interplay of discourses on sexuality and (post)colonialism."

It also traced the ancestry of the principal characters during Spanish and American colonialism in the Philippines. The personal memories of the main characters was a recollection of a "state of war" in the Philippines during Marcos's regime that failed to become a true revolution.

== Reception ==
State of War was published to positive reviews.

Publishers Weekly wrote: "One wishes Rosca had used less allegory and more realistic detail; often the unique situation in the Philippines is lost in her somewhat mannered style. Still, there is an erratic, Kafkaesque brilliance, an intensity that makes this first novel a powerful piece of literature."

The Philippine Daily Inquirer wrote in 2020: "State of War" is Filipina fictionist Ninotchka Rosca’s masterpiece.... It is essential reading for Filipinos."

== Bibliography ==
Notes

References

- Davis, Rocío G. (1999). "Postcolonial Visions and Immigrant Longings: Ninotchka Rosca's Versions of the Philippines". World Literature Today. 73 (1): 62–70. doi:10.2307/40154476. ISSN 0196-3570. JSTOR 40154476. Archived from the original on 2011-06-04 – via Questia.
- Manuel, Dolores de (Spring 2004). "Decolonizing Bodies, Reinscribing Souls in the Fiction of Ninotchka Rosca and Linda Ty-Casper". MELUS. 29 (1): 99–118. doi:10.2307/4141797. ISSN 0163-755X. JSTOR 4141797.
- Nelson, Emmanuel Sampath (2000). Asian American novelists: a bio-bibliographical critical sourcebook (2000 ed.). Greenwood Publishing Group. ISBN 978-0-313-30911-3. - Total pages: 422
- Rosca, Ninotchka (1990). State of war: a novel (1990 ed.). Simon & Schuster. ISBN 978-0-671-68669-7. - Total pages: 382
