= Bamboo in the Wind =

1990 novel by Azucena Grajo Uranza

- Book cover for Azucena Grajo Uranza’s Bamboo in the Wind.
- Author: Azucena Grajo Uranza
- Language: English
- Genre: Fiction
- Publication place: Philippines

Bamboo in the Wind is a 1990 novel written by Filipino author and Palanca Memorial Awards recipient Azucena Grajo Uranza. Chronologically, Bamboo in the Wind comes after Uranza's other novel A Passing Season.

== About the Book ==
=== Plot description ===
In 1972, months prior to the Martial Law declaration, Larry Esteva arrived in Manila, Philippines after studying in Boston, Massachusetts. At Manila International Airport, he witnessed a demonstration being dispersed by the Philippine military. Uranza portrayed the "last desperate efforts" of Filipinos – through characters that include a senator, a youthful nationalist, a dispossessed farmer, a drastic protester, a convent school girl, and a Jesuit academic – to prevent the fall of the Philippines under martial rule. But the political plague accompanied by demonstrations, demolitions, murders, burnings, arrests and tortures continued unhindered until Martial Law was officially declared in the month of September.
