= Quezon National High School =

Public high school in Lucena, Philippines

Location
- M.L. Tagarao St., Brgy. Ibabang Iyam, Lucena City, Quezon Province; 13°55′58″N 121°36′20″E

Information
- Former names: Quezon Provincial High School (QPHS)
- Established: October 1902
- Principal: Joseph C. Hinanay
- Grades: 7 to 12
- Enrollment: est.11000
- Colors: red, blue, yellow, and green
- Newspaper: The Coconut/Ang Niyog

Quezon National High School (QNHS) is a major public secondary high school in Brgy. Ibabang Iyam, Lucena City, Philippines. It is one of the largest contingent national high schools in the Philippines, both by size and by population, with more than 11,000 enrollees from grade 7 to grade 12.

Aside from offering the K-12 basic education curriculum, it also offers many different subjects and electives through its various special programs, with specific curricula for science, technology and engineering (STE), journalism (SPJ), arts (SPA), sports (SPS), and foreign languages (SPFL).

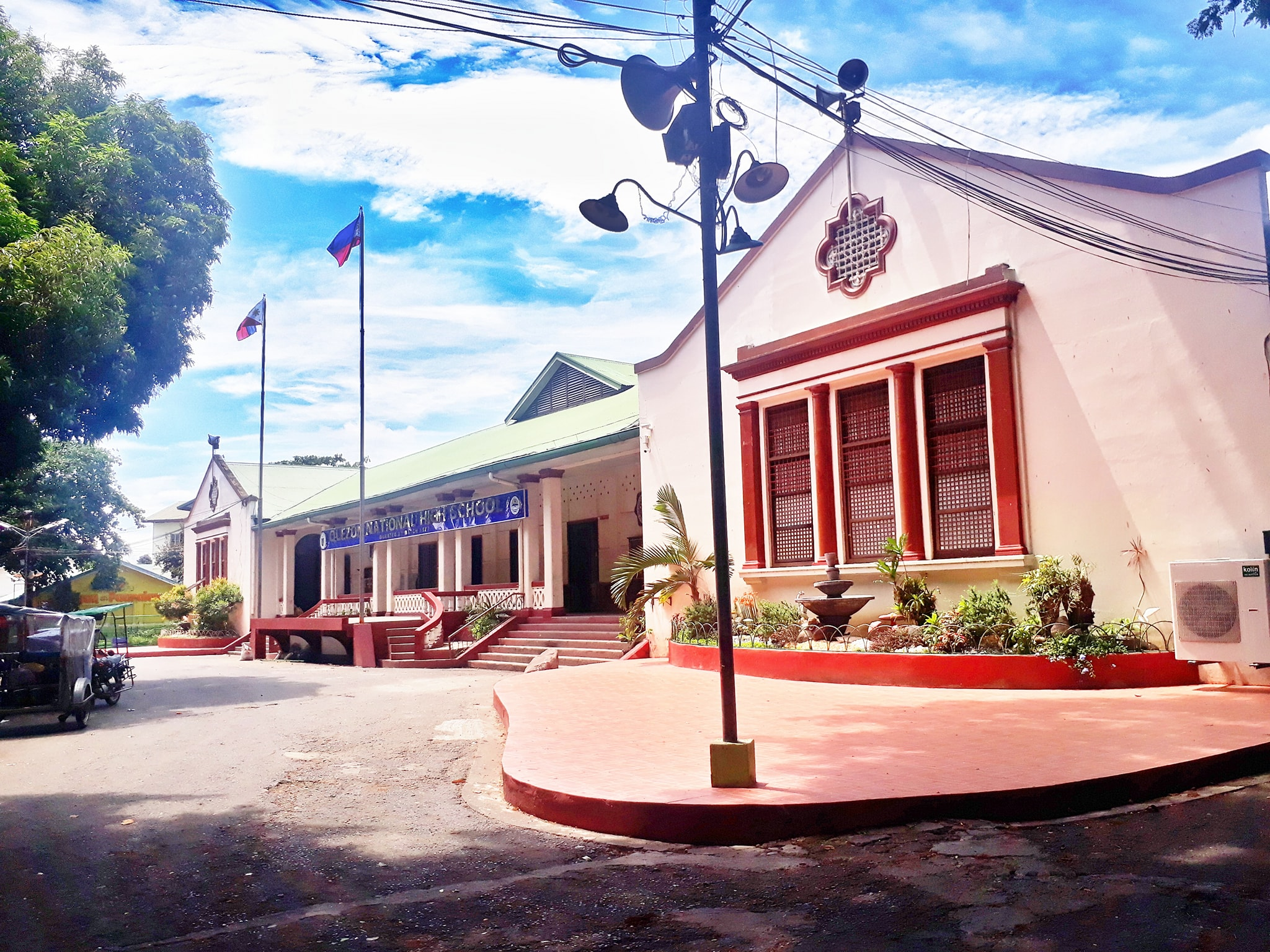
The QNHS Gabaldon Building, one of many heritage school buildings in the Philippines built by the American government during the American colonial era.

== History ==
Tayabas High School (now Quezon National High School) was founded in October 1902 when Aubrey Boyles, a Thomasite, organized a school in a convent of Lucena on the northern side of Saint Ferdinand Parish Church (now Lucena Cathedral). Fifty students were exposed to the English language with 19 American teachers.

The increase in student population on March 1, 1903, made Henry Balch the new principal. A strong typhoon destroyed the convent on September 26, 1905, that forced the school to be transferred to a building on Granja Street.

A two-storey building was built on June 6, 1906. Since then, a number of principals have stood at the helm of the school. When Japanese atrocities reached Atimonan, Quezon, on December 23, 1941, students continued to flock to Tayabas High School and were automatically promoted. After a year, classes resumed at the Lucena Elementary School (now Lucena West) for girls and at the Trade School for boys. The Gabaldon Building (ruined by a fire) became the Provincial Hospital.

Classes were transferred to the Tong Ho School Building in 1944. The formal liberation of Tayabas Province took place on April 4, 1945, after which classes opened at Lucena Catholic Hall (now Maryhill College Building).

In June 1945, the high school was relocated at the Tayabas Provincial Capitol and the Court of First Instance Building, whereby 54 students graduated, girls in Balintawak and boys in Barong Tagalog on July 28, 1945. President Manuel Roxas signed Republic Act No. 14 on September 7, 1946, renaming the province of Tayabas to Quezon: Tayabas High School became Quezon Provincial High School.

The Batas Pambansa No. 1820 renamed Quezon Provincial High School as Quezon National High School with Dr. Cesar Villariba as the author.

== Alma mater ==
The alma mater of the Quezon National High School has the same tune as the Italian fascist song, "Giovinezza".

== The Coconut ==
The then Tayabas High School published The Coconut in 1928 with Filemon Juntereal, Sr. as the first editor. The publication came out twice a month in a four-page tabloid. The magazine came as the graduation issue. The first Filipino adviser was Gabriel Tuazon.

The Lucena City-based publication of the school whose name had evolved to Quezon Provincial (later, National) High School amassed awards in local and national press conferences with Marie Delicia T. Unson as adviser. In the 1977 National Secondary Schools Press Conference, The Coconut reaped a golden harvest when adjudged second best high school paper in the Philippines for Bracket B, against Baguio's The Pine Tree, as The Coconut garnered the most medals overall.

The silver medal finish was the second best in the history of The Coconut, next only to the gold medal the 1972 powerhouse staff steered by editor-in-chief Samuel Organo took home. But not even that 1972 feat produced as many group medals as the big haul of the 1977 edition, which had Marie Delicia T. Unson as adviser; Normita Atienza, co-adviser; and Ricardo J. Cueto, Jr. as editor-in-chief. That year, The Coconut and The Pine Tree of Baguio so dominated the competitions they practically split the top group honors just between them.

The publication celebrated its 75th anniversary in 2003 where previous and present staff writers and advisers joined together to party. Present in the celebration was writer Joseph Morong, now a GMA 7 reporter.

Currently, the adviser of The Coconut is Abner Pureza with co-adviser Maria Aluinda Puno with Ramonito Elumbaring, Mark John Ayuso, Arlene Aurin and Vanessa Ellaga.

== Admission ==
Admission to the high school is automatic for those who have completed six years of elementary school. Beginning 7th grade, education is compulsory and free to all students attending the school year. However, while general admission is automatic and free for all enrollees taking the Basic Education Program (BEP), entrance to the school's special curricular programs is highly selective and includes a competitive examination as well as interviews.

== Academics ==
=== Special program in science, technology and engineering (STE) ===
Quezon National High School is one of only 110 specialized STEM schools in the entire country offering DepEd's Special Program in Science, Technology, and Engineering for students in grades 7 to 10. Only three types of high schools in the Philippines (STEM high schools, high schools in the Regional Science High School Union and the Philippine Science High School System) currently offer this special curriculum that places more importance in mathematics and the sciences, as well as research. Because of this highly selective environment for students, transfer students are only permitted to enroll to the STE program provided the student is coming from another STEM high school, from an RSHS or from the PSHS System.

==== Science, technology, engineering and mathematics (STEM) curriculum ====
Since its implementation, this rigorous curriculum has continued to produce quality STEM-education for Quezon National High School students. In 2019, Nathaniel Reyes, a student from QNHS and an alumnus of the school's STE program, represented the Philippines at the Intel International Science and Engineering Fair (ISEF) in the United States.

Subject Area	Curriculum Year Grade 7	Curriculum Year Grade 8	Curriculum Year Grade 9	Curriculum Year Grade 10
Science	Integrated Science; Earth and Environmental Science	Biological Science	Biology II(Advanced Biology); Chemistry I(Basic Chemistry); Physics I(Basic Physics)	Chemistry II(Advanced Chemistry); Physics II(Advanced Physics)
Mathematics	Elementary Algebra	Intermediate Algebra; Geometry; Basic Statistics	Trigonometry (Advanced Algebra)	Analytic Geometry; Calculus
English	Grammar, Communication Skills, and Literature	Grammar, Communication Skills, and Afro-Asian Literature	Grammar, Communication Skills, and Asian Literature	Grammar, Communication Skills, and World Literature
Filipino	Filipino I (Ibong Adarna)	Filipino II (Florante at Laura)	Filipino III (Noli Me Tangere)	Filipino IV (El Filibusterismo)
Social Science	Araling Panlipunan I (Philippine History)	Araling Panlipunan II (World History)	Araling Panlipunan III (Economics)	Araling Panlipunan IV (Contemporary Issues)
Technology and Livelihood Education	TLE I: Computer Education	TLE II: Information and Communications Technology, Agriculture/Fisheries, Civil Technology, Electronics/Electricity, Woodworking	Consumer Chemistry: Organic Chemistry, Food Chemistry, Chemistry in Everyday Life, Chemistry in Medicine	TLE IV: Information and Communications Technology, Agriculture/Fisheries, Civil Technology, Digital Electronics(Robotics)/Electricity
MAPEH	Music, Arts, Physical Education, and Health I	Music, Arts, Physical Education, and Health II	Music, Arts, Physical Education, and Health III	Music, Arts, Physical Education, and Health IV
Research	Research I-A (Basic Statistics and Technical Writing)	Research II (English for Science and Tech., Basic Statistics in Research)	Research III (Research in Science)	Research IV
Values Education	Values Education I	Values Education II	Values Education III	Values Education IV
	Developmental Reading		Biotechnology, Advanced Statistics	

=== Special program in journalism (SPJ) ===
The special program in journalism is developed to enrich the experiences, hone the journalistic skills and competencies of student-writers and to strengthen free and responsible journalism. It is designed to develop the learners’ skills in mass communication, print, online and broadcast media. Its main focus is primarily on writing as a process and as an art.

=== Special program in arts (SPA) ===
The special program in the arts is designed to cater to the needs of students who are talented in the arts. It is a program for students with potential talents in different fields of arts, namely, music, visual arts, theater arts, media arts, creative writing and dance. The program offers a comprehensive secondary education centered in the arts, covering a range of art forms and disciplines. Arts education is an integral component of a balanced educational program and also provides the background for post-secondary level work.

=== Special program for sports (SPS) ===
The special program in sports is in the line with efforts of the Department of Education to institutionalize a program that will identify students with potential sports talents and train them for higher levels of athletic competitions. The special program for sports offers a four-year secondary curriculum patterned after that of a regular high school, with specialization in sports.

=== Special program in foreign languages (SPFL) ===
In selective schools, various languages may be offered as electives like in an SPFL program. Quezon National High School is one of the only a handful of schools in the country offering the Special Program in the Korean language.

=== Senior high school ===
The high school curriculum for students in grades 11 and 12 includes core classes and specialization classes based on student choice of specialization. Students may choose a specialization based on aptitude, interests, and school capacity. Classes or courses are divided into two: core curriculum subjects and track subjects.

There are eight learning areas under the core curriculum. These are language, humanities, communication, mathematics, science, social science, philosophy, physical education, and health. These make up 15 core courses with the same contents and competencies but with allowed contextualization based on school's location despite specializations of tracks and strands.

== Notable alumni ==
- Mau Marcelo, the first winner of Philippine Idol
- Paz Marquez Benitez
- Cong. Danilo E. Suarez, former Governor of Quezon Province
