= Ninotchka Rosca =

Filipino activist and writer

- Born: 17 December 1946 (age 79); Third Philippine Republic
- Education: University of the Philippines Diliman
- Occupations: Author, feminist, journalist, human right activist
- Spouse: Rolando E. Peña (1960s)
- Partner: Luis V. Teodoro
- Children: 1

Antonia Rosca (born December 17, 1946), known by her pen name Ninotchka Rosca, is a Filipina feminist, author, journalist, and human rights activist best known for her 1988 novel State of War and for her activism, especially during the martial law dictatorship of former Philippine president Ferdinand Marcos. Rosca has been described as "one of the major players in the saga of Filipina American writers."

Rosca was a recipient of the American Book Award in 1993 for her novel Twice Blessed.

== Biography ==
=== Education and early career ===
Rosca received a Bachelor of Arts degree in English (Comparative Literature) at the University of the Philippines Diliman, and became a journalist working for various Philippine publications after she graduated. She was taking up Asian Studies (Khmer Civilization) for her graduate studies at the time she had to leave the Philippines because of the Marcos dictatorship.

=== Imprisonment and exile during martial law ===
Rosca was one of many Philippine journalists who became political prisoners under the dictatorial government of Ferdinand Marcos in the Philippines. She was detained for six months, and was interrogated several times before her release. On getting out of prison, she took a job with an investment company in Manila while raising funds to help people hide from Marcos' security forces. When she received a tip that she was about to be arrested a second time, she sought help from a cultural attache at the U.S. Embassy, who helped Rosca leave the Philippines in 1977 by getting her into an international writers program in the United States.

While in exile, Rosca was designated as one of the 12 "Asian-American Women of Hope" by the Bread and Roses Cultural Project. These women were chosen by scholars and community leaders for their courage, compassion, and commitment in helping to shape society. They are considered role models for young people of color, who, in the words of Gloria Steinem, "have been denied the knowledge that greatness looks like them.

In 1986, she returned to the Philippines to report on the final days of Marcos.

=== Personal life ===
Ninotchka Rosca was once married to geologist Rolando "Rolly" E. Peña, a fellow activist, in the 1960s. They had one child, Sibyl Jade, who was born in the 1960s and raised by Rosca's newer partner, journalist Luis V. Teodoro along with his son with her, Luis Renato, after Rosca was forced to leave for the United States in 1977.

== Works ==
=== Novels ===
- Twice Blessed: A Novel (1992)
- State of War (1988)

=== Nonfiction ===
- Endgame: The Fall of Marcos (Franklin Watts, 1987)
- Jose Maria Sison: At Home in the World—Portrait of a Revolutionary, co-authored with Jose Maria Sison (2004)
- Folding Water: The Search for a Quantum Theory of Turbulence, co-authored with Amador Muriel (2009)

=== Story collections ===
- Stories of a Bitter Country (Anvil, 2019)
- Gang of Five (Independently Published, 2013)
- Sugar & Salt (2006)
- The Monsoon Collection (Asian and Pacific Writing) (University of Queensland Press, 1983)
- Bitter Country and Other Stories (Malaya Books, 1970)

== Reception and recognition ==
Rosca's novel State of War is considered a classic account of ordinary people's dictatorship. Her second best-selling English language novel Twice Blessed won her the 1993 American Book Award for excellence in literature.

Rosca is a classic short story writer. Her story "Epidemic" was included in the 1986 100 Short Stories in the United States by Raymond Carver and in the Missouri Review collection of their Best Published Stories in 25 Years, while "Sugar & Salt" was included in the Ms Magazine's Best Fiction in 30 Years.

== See also ==
- Cecilia Manguerra Brainard
- Maria Rosa Luna Henson
- Angela Manalang-Gloria
- PAWWA
- Paz Márquez-Benítez
- Sophia G. Romero
- Women in the Philippines
- Liwayway Arceo
- Lualhati Bautista
