= Lina Espina-Moore =

Cebuano writer

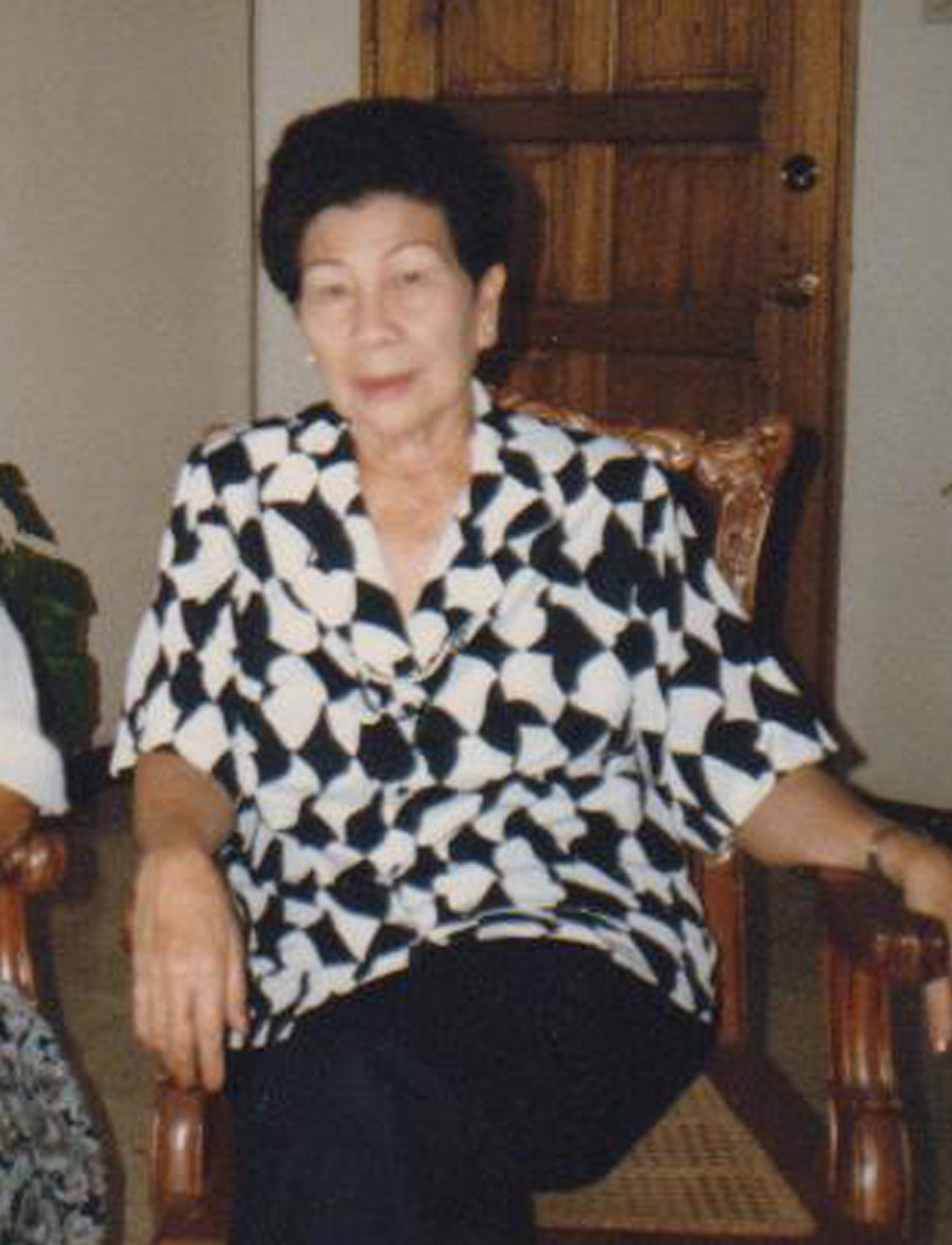
- Born: 1919; Toledo, Cebu, Philippine Islands
- Died: 2000
- Occupations: Novelist; short story writer; essayist; poet

Lina Espina-Moore (born Austregelina Espina) (May 20, 1919 – 2000) was a Cebuano writer. She was a recipient of the S.E.A. Write Award.

== Biography ==
She was born in Toledo, Cebu, the fifth child and second daughter of Yrinea Regner and Gerundio Espina. Her formative academic years were spent at the Cebu Central School and at the Cebu Intermediate High School. She then graduated from the Southern Colleges with an Associate of Arts degree. A brief stint as a law student at Far Eastern University in Manila was followed by a job as a cub reporter for the Manila Times.

Among her awards are the Philippines Free Press Literary Award for 1994, when she won first prize in the short story contest and for her “outstanding contribution to Philippine arts and letters.” She was also the “unanimous choice” by the Creative Writing Center at the University of the Philippines for the 1995-96 National Fellowship in Literature, an honor she couldn't accept because of health reasons.

Along with other female reporters, Espina established the Philippine Association of Women Writers (PAWW) in 1950. While in this group, Espina's Just Like A Dream was published in the Graphic; it was her first fiction piece to see the light of day in a regionally-circulated magazine. This was followed by the Sunday Times Magazine's publication of her Timeless Waters. While more of her stories began making the rounds of other magazines, Espina flitted from one writing job to the next, running the gamut of editorial work, ghost writing and public relations. With many writing successes in English under her belt, Espina decided to pen manuscripts in her native Cebuano and send these to Liwayway Publications’ Cebuano magazine Bisaya.

Previous awards include: Outstanding Achievement in the Field of English Literature from the Province of Cebu (1975), Pan Pacific Southeast Asian Association Award in the Field of the English Novel (1975), Magsusulat Award for Exemplary Contribution to Literature in Cebuano (1987), and the much-esteemed Thailand Southeast Asian Write Award presented by HRH Crown Prince Vajiralongkorn for her novel Heart of the Lotus in 1989. In 1992 she received both the Women in Travel Award in the Field of Literature and the Literary Award from the Mariano F. Manguerra Foundation.

In 1960, Espina married Climpson S. "Kip" Moore, manager of a lumber company in the Cordilleras. The couple made their home in Mt Data until Kip Moore's death in 1977. During her stay there, Espina-Moore wrote about tribal minorities. She resided in Alabang, Metro Manila, but moved to her hometown Cebu in recent years to be with her son and his family.

Lina Espina-Moore died in 2000, and to fulfill a promise to Lina, Edna Zapanta Manlapaz wrote Austregelina: A Story of Lina Espina Moore's Life and Selected Works (Anvil, 2000).

Espina-Moore wrote three novels: The Heart of the Lotus, A Lion In The House, and The Honey, The Locust. Her short stories are found in two collections: Cuentos, and Choice. She edited a collection of writings by Cebu writers, Cebuano Harvest I (New Day Publishers, 1992). She also collected and edited, The Stories of Estrella D. Alfon (Giraffe Books, 1994).

== Works ==
=== Novels ===
- Heart of the Lotus (1970, 1982)
- A Lion in the House (1980)
- The Honey, the Locusts (1992)

=== Short story collections ===
- Cuentos (1985)
- Choice (1995)

== Books she edited ==
- Cebuano Harvest I (New Day Publishers, 1992)
- The Stories of Estrella D. Alfon (Giraffe Books, 1994)

== Awards, honors and prizes ==
- Gawad Bambansang Alagad ni Balagtas by the Writers Union of the Philippines in 1992
- S.E.A. Write Award (Southeast Asian Writers Awards) in 1989
- Mariano F. Manguerra Literature Award in 1992
- National Fellow for Fiction by the Creative Writing Center of the University of the Philippines in 1995
- Women in Travel Award in the Field of Literature in 1992

== External links and other sources ==
- CCP Encyclopedia of Philippine Art. Vol. IX: Philippine Literature. p. 598. Cultural Center of the Philippines, 1994.
- Cecilia Manguerra Brainard. "Writers from the South." Philippine American News, July 1–15, 1988, p. 19.
- Bresnahan, Roger J. "Lina Espina Moore." Conversations with Filipino Writers, New Day Publishers, 1990.
- Kalaw-Tirol, Lorna. "Lina Espina Moore: A Checkered Life." Celebrity, September 15, 1982, pp. 26, 31–33, 43.
- "Lina Espina Moore: Literature and Journalism." Vista, July 9, 1982, p. 32.
- Pasticha, Josephine. "Lina Espina-Moore. "I Am A Laborer of Words," People
- Lina Espina-Moore Filipina Writer
- The History of Filipino Women's Writings by Riita Vartti
