= Dorothy Norman =

American writer, editor, arts patron, social activist (1905-1997)

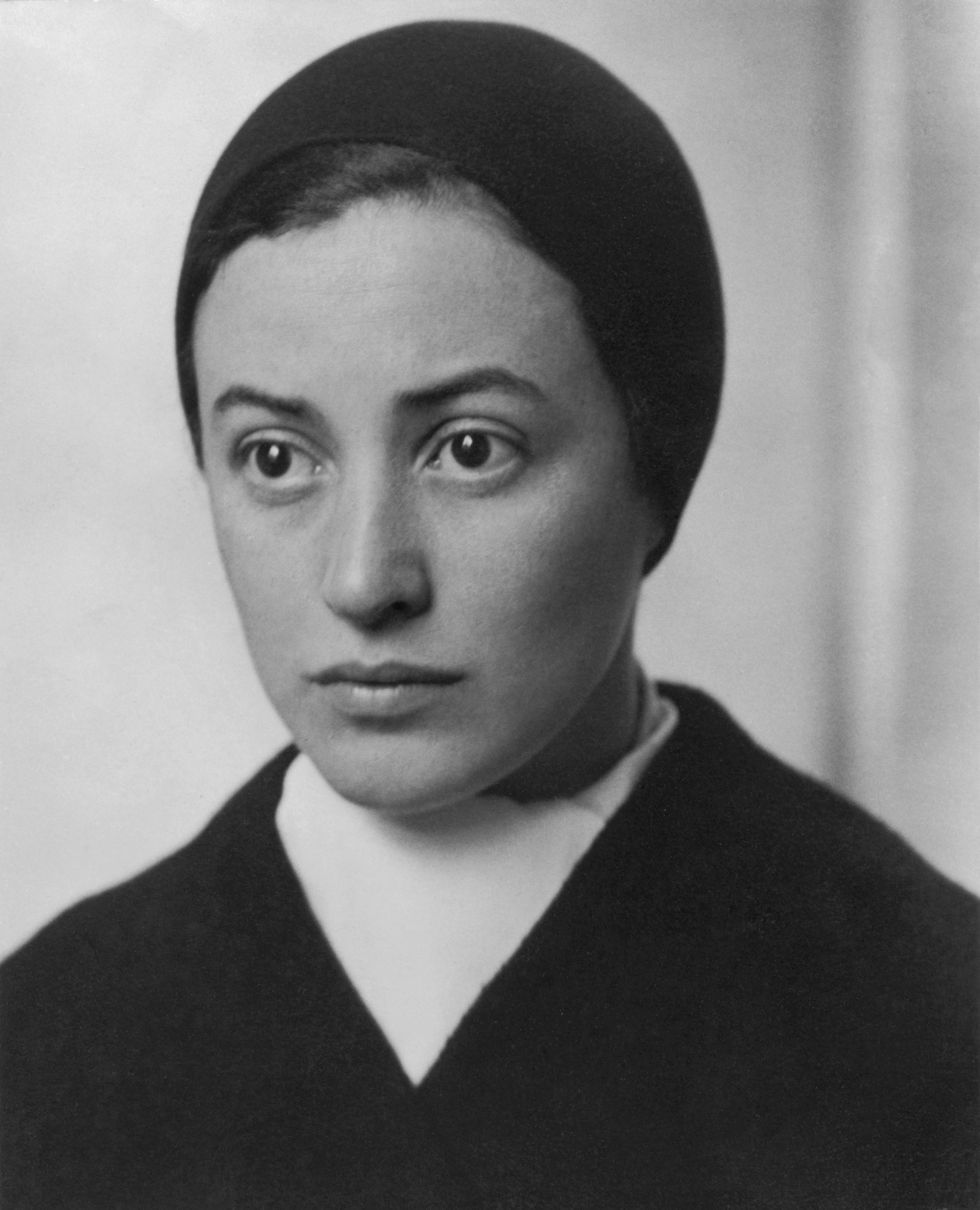
- Dorothy Norman (Alfred Stieglitz, 1932)
- Born: Dorothy Stecker; March 28, 1905; Philadelphia, Pennsylvania
- Died: April 12, 1997 (aged 92); East Hampton, New York
- Known for: Photography, writing
- Spouse: Edward A. Norman (m. 1925–1951)

Dorothy Norman (née Stecker; 28 March 1905 – 12 April 1997) was an American photographer, writer, editor, arts patron and advocate for social change.

== Biography ==
Born Dorothy Stecker in Philadelphia to a prominent Jewish family, she was educated in arts and languages from her youth. In 1925, she married Edward A. Norman, the son of an early Sears & Roebuck entrepreneur. They lived in New York City, where Mrs. Norman immersed herself in social-activism groups: as a researcher for the American Civil Liberties Union; with Planned Parenthood, the National Urban League, and the Group Theatre. In the meantime, they had two children together, Andrew and Nancy.

== Education ==
She attended Smith College, then transferred to the University of Pennsylvania, remaining there from 1922 until her 1925 marriage.

== Arts patron and Stieglitz devotee ==
Her life was motivated by "a desire to advance both art and action". She actively cultivated an interest in people who were involved with either the artistic arena or efforts at increasing social equity. In this role, she became acquainted with photographer Alfred Stieglitz, who was already a towering influence in the nascent field of art photography when they met in 1927. Although both were married at that time — she to Norman and he to modern artist Georgia O'Keeffe — they entered into a long-term affair after Stieglitz began mentoring her. Their relationship continued until his death in 1946. Her marriage to Edward Norman ended in divorce in 1951.

== Photographer ==
Norman never worked as a professional photographer; instead, she captured images of friends, loved ones and prominent figures in the arts and in politics. People she photographed included Jawaharlal Nehru, Indira Gandhi, Thomas Mann (with his wife Katia, or Katy), John Cage, Marcel Duchamp, Bernard Berenson, Albert Einstein, Theodore Dreiser, Elia Kazan, Lewis Mumford and Sherwood Anderson.

She also photographed special sites, trees, harbors, churches and buildings. She detailed the interior of An American Place, Stieglitz's last gallery, in photographs included in America and Alfred Stieglitz, A Collective Portrait, published in 1934. She created an extended portrait study of Stieglitz (he returned the favour by creating a similar study of Norman).

Norman's photographic work is noted for its clarity of vision, masterful blend of light and shading, and professional-quality printing techniques.

== Social activism ==
During the 1930s and 1940s, Norman was active in various liberal causes, particularly civil rights, education, and independence for India. In order to draw attention to these causes, such as racial discrimination in America, Supreme Court decisions, and Nazi medical atrocities, she wrote different publications. She was a founding member of New York City's Liberal Party and a member of the Americans for Democratic Action, and served on the boards of both the New York Urban League and the National Urban League.

== Writing career ==
Norman was a productive author. She wrote a weekly column for the New York Post (1942-1949) and for ten years (1938-1948) edited and published the literary and social activist journal Twice a Year, whose contributors included Richard Wright, Albert Camus, Jean-Paul Sartre and Bertolt Brecht. Norman chose provocative aphorisms by contemporary and historical writers, male and female, and from various cultures, to accompany the thematic groups of photographs in sections of MoMA's world-touring exhibition The Family of Man for its curator Edward Steichen, a long-term associate of Alfred Stieglitz.

She wrote or edited numerous books, including The Selected Writings of John Marin (1949); Nehru: The First Sixty Years (1965), a two-volume collection of the Indian leader's writings; Alfred Stieglitz: An American Seer (1970), the first full-length biography of the American modernist; and Indira Gandhi: Letters to an American Friend (1985). Her memoir, Encounters, was published in 1987. She also wrote the book The Spirit of India.
