= Manual of the Mustard Seed Garden =

Manual of Chinese painting

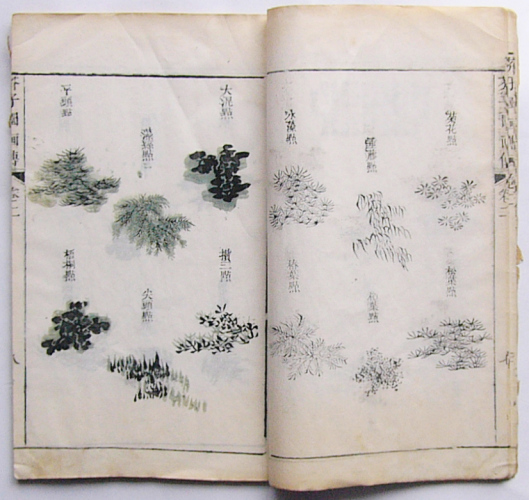
Teaching how to draw leaves

Manual of the Mustard Seed Garden (芥子園畫傳, Jieziyuan Huazhuan), sometimes known as Jieziyuan Huapu (芥子園畫譜), is a printed manual of Chinese painting compiled during the early-Qing Dynasty. Many renowned later Chinese painters, like Qi Baishi, began their drawing lessons with the manual. It is an important early example of colour printing.

The work was commissioned by Shen Xinyou (沈心友), whose mansion in Lanxi, Zhejiang province was known as Jieziyuan, or Mustard Seed Garden. Shen possessed the teaching materials of Li Liufang (李流芳), a painter of the late-Ming dynasty, and commissioned Wang Gai(王概), Wang Shi (王蓍), Wang Nie (王臬), and Zhu Sheng (诸升) to edit and expand those materials with the aim of producing a manual for landscape painting. The result was the first part of Jieziyuan Huazhuan, published in 1679, in five colours. It comprises five juan (卷) or fascicles. Li Yu, as the publisher, wrote a preface for this part. The first fascicle deals with the general principles of landscape painting, the second the painting of trees, the third that of hills and stones, the fourth that of people and houses, and the fifth comprises the selected works of great landscape painters.

"Jieziyuan Huazhuan Lotus Flowers", Mustard Seed Garden Painting Manual

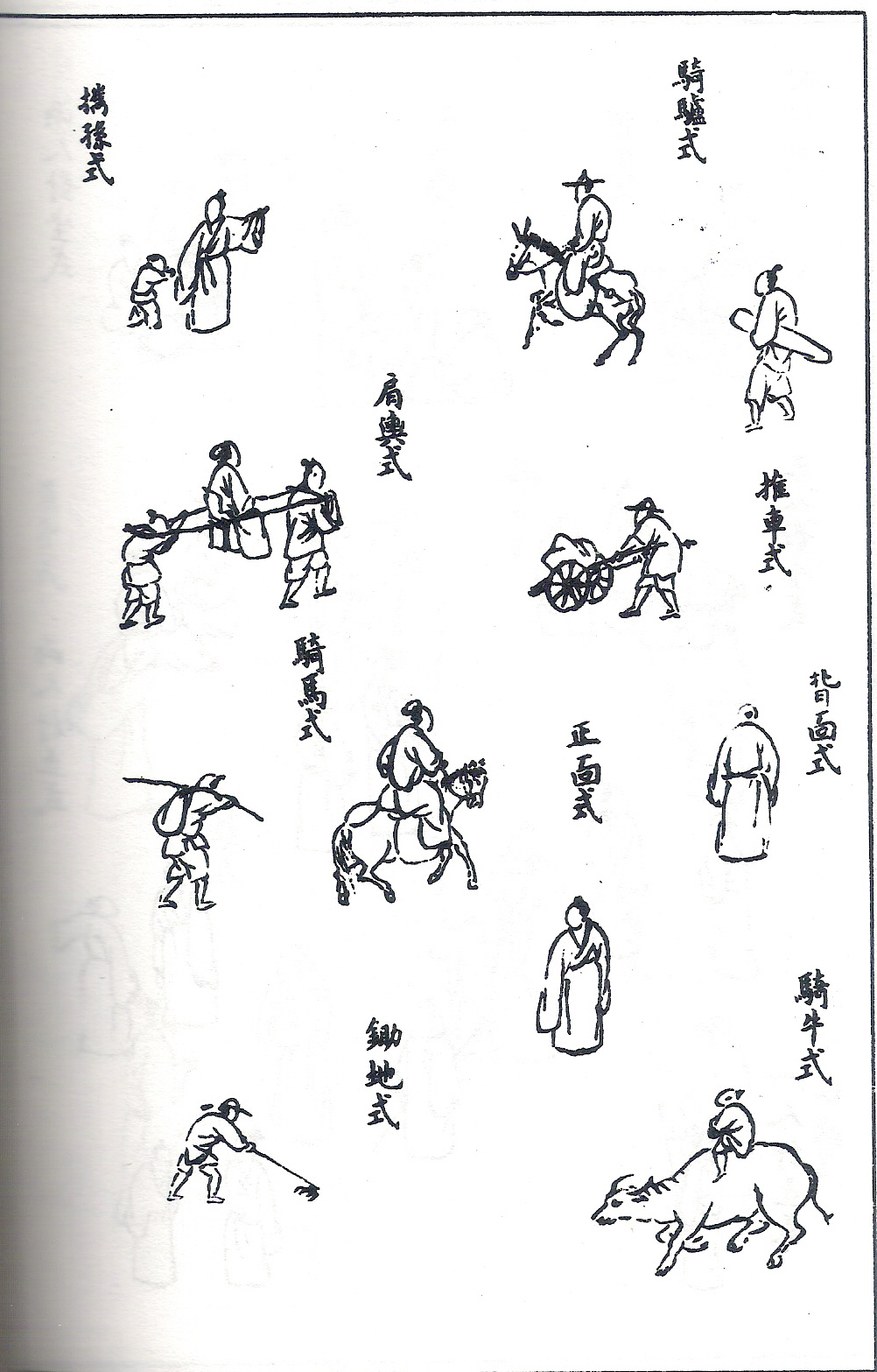
Teaching how to draw people

The volume also entered Edo period Japan, where woodblock printed copies became relatively easily accessible in all the major cities; the Mustard Seed Garden Manual came to be used by Japanese nanga (bunjinga) artists and was an important element in the training of nanga artists and the development of nanga painting.

Two more parts, which deal with the painting of flora and fauna, were produced by Wang and his two brothers and published 1701. Shen promised a fourth part, but never published it. A fourth part, which deals with portraits, was produced by some quick profit-seeking publisher, though. Chao Xun (巢勛) (1852–1917), dissatisfied with the fake, produced his own sequel, as well as carefully reproduced the first three volumes. Reprints of the first three volumes are usually based on Chao's reproduction.

An English translation of the work, The Tao of Painting – A study of the ritual disposition of Chinese painting. With a translation of the Chieh Tzu Yuan Hua Chuan or Mustard Seed Garden Manual of Painting 1679–1701, was made by Mai-mai Sze and published in New York in 1956.
