= Philippine American Women Writers and Artists =

Philippine American Writers and Artists (PAWWA)
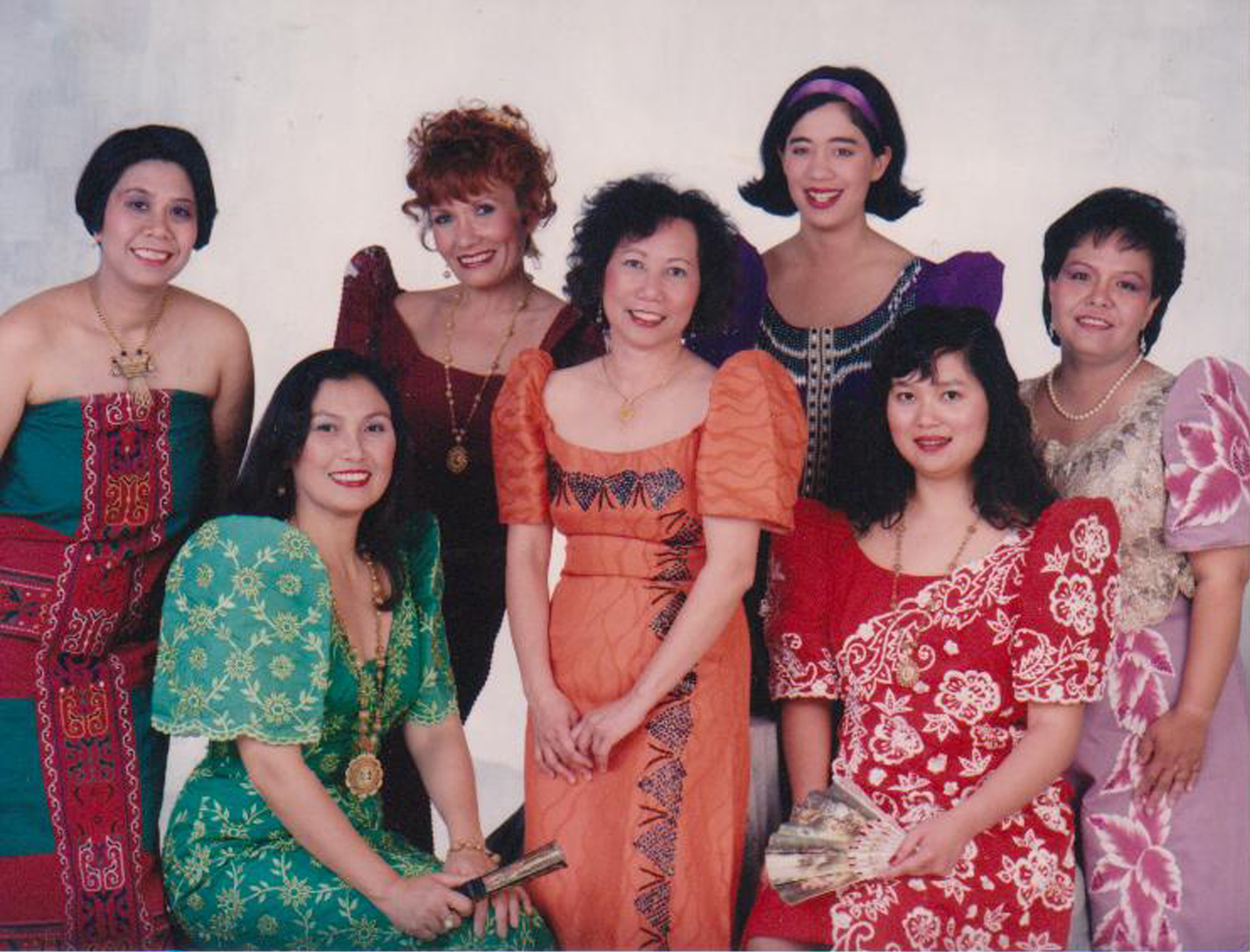
- PAWWA co-founders

Philippine American Women Writers and Artists (PAWWA) was founded in 1991 by a group of seven Filipina writers in Southern California. It was the first such support group for Filipina women writers. Aside from supporting one another, the group wanted to help other Filipina writers and artists, as well as to provide community service. PAWWA encouraged the creation of PAWWA-North, headed by Ceres Alabado in the Bay Area, California.

PAWWA's founding members are: Valorie Slaughter Bejarano, Cecilia Manguerra Brainard, Mariquita Athena Davison, Fe Panalingan Koons, Susan N. Montepio, Cecile Caguingin Ochoa, and Nentuzka C. Villamar.

For six years, PAWWA received the highly competitive Multicultural Entry Grant from the California Arts Council (CAC). PAWWA used that funding to help publish a newsletter and books: Seven Stories from Seven Sisters: A Collection of Philippine Folktales (1992); The Beginning and Other Asian Folktales (1995);A Directory of Philippine American Women Writers and Artists; and Journey of 100 Years: Reflections on the Centennial of Philippine Independence (1999).

On April 14, 1998, PAWWA and the Asian Pacific Student Services of Loyola Marymount University held a one-day conference entitled "Journey of 100 Years". Presenters were: Cecilia Manguerra Brainard, Maria Luisa Carino (or Maria Luisa Igloria), Rosita Galang, Paulino Lim Jr., Edmundo Litton, Herminia Menez, Susan Montepio, and Nadine Sarreal. An offshoot of that conference was the book, Journey of 100 Years.

When PAWWA's CAC funding ran out in June 1998, the remaining members of PAWWA decided to move on, and PAWWA was dissolved.

== Books published by PAWWA ==
- Seven Stories From Seven Sisters: A Collection of Philippines Folktales, PAWWA, 1992
- The Beginning and Other Asian Folktales PAWWA, 1995
- A Directory of Philippine American Women Writers and Artists
- Journey of 100 Years: Reflections on the Centennial of Philippine Independence, PAWWA, 1999
- Asian and Philippine Folktales: Retellings by PAWWA, PALH, 2022

== See also ==
- Category:Filipino women writers
- Category:Filipino women artists
