= Filipino women writers =

Filipino women writers have played important roles within Philippine literature, with Philippine women having created enduring works of fiction and non-fiction across the genres. Writing in English, Spanish, Filipino and other local languages and native dialects, female writers from the Philippine archipelago utilized literature, in contrast with the oral tradition of the past, as the living voices of their personal experiences, thoughts, consciousness, concepts of themselves, society, politics, Philippine and world history. They employed the "power of the pen" and the printed word in order to shatter the so-called "Great Grand Silence of the Centuries" of Filipino female members, participants, and contributors to the progress and development of the Philippine Republic, and consequently the rest of the world. Filipino women authors have "put pen to paper" to present, express, and describe their own image and culture to the world, as they see themselves.

== Image and influence ==
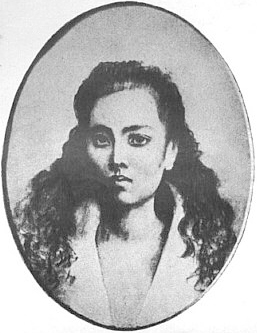
Leonor Rivera, one of the four influences to Filipina women writers. Rivera is the Maria Clara in José Rizal's novels.

Among the principal influences on the Filipina self-image are the writings of four women in Philippine history, namely: Gabriela Silang, Leonor Rivera, Imelda Marcos and Corazon Aquino. Often mentioned in Philippine literature, these four represent the struggle, perception and character of how it is to be a woman in Philippine society. Gabriela Silang was a katipunera or a revolutionary – a representation of female bravery – who fought against Spanish colonialism in the 18th century. Silang was a contrast to the chaste and religiously devout image of the Filipino lady as portrayed by Jose Rizal through his Spanish-language novels, Noli Me Tangere and El Filibusterismo. Within the pages of these 19th-century novels, Rizal depicted Leonor Rivera - a girlfriend of his - through the fictional character of Maria Clara as the epitome of virtue, i.e., the ideal Filipina. Then there was the arrival of Imelda Marcos – the "beauty queen and dictator’s wife … a power-seeking type of woman…" – after that, the country saw the advent and rise of Corazon C. Aquino, the first woman president in Asia and the Philippines – the elected 1986 replacement of a male despot, Ferdinand Marcos. Gloria Macapagal Arroyo, after two male presidents (Fidel V. Ramos and Joseph Estrada, respectively), followed in the footsteps of Corazon Aquino to become a leader and political figure of an Asian nation.

In the latter years of modern-day Philippine literature, from the 1960s to the 1980s, feminism became the focus of Philippine women writers – first in poetry and then prose – in order to break away from what was termed the "Great Grand Silence of the Centuries". Creating an image unique to themselves – through their own individual efforts – became the norm. There was criticism against the Maria Clara image portrayed by the Philippine paladin, José Rizal, as well as critiques and feminine disapproval of how Filipino men writers wrote about women. Contemporary feminist female writers were also inclined to break away from the traditional, idealized and typecast image of the Filipina of the past as matriarchal mystics and figures who performed sacrifices, underwent suffrage and works of martyrdom which was to be expected, given their pious upbringing. Women writers also passed judgment against the typical portrayal of women as sex symbols. Among the first lady writers to break away from the old style and genre, exemplified in the works of past female writers, were Paz Latorena's traditional "teachings" about the ideal Filipina in the feminist poet, Marjorie Evasco. Other women writers like Kerima Polotan Tuvera, Rosario Cruz Lucero, Ligaya Victorio-Reyes and Jessica Zafra even stepped forward to boldly make it a "fashion" to discuss aspects of womanhood that were previously regarded as taboo in Philippine society, such as those dealing in female anatomy, erotica, divorce or separation from former husbands, abortion, premarital affairs, and childless marriages. An example is the 1992 publication of Forbidden Fruit, a bilingual volume combining Filipino and English language works of women.

== Language and education ==
Contrary to the treatment received by Filipinos during the Spanish colonial period, the education of the Philippine citizenry was prioritized during the time of the American occupation, as seen in the activities of the Thomasites and U.S. military personnel in the islands in the early 20th century. Thus, only the elite class of society – those known as the Ilustrados – preferred using Spanish rather than enhancing and developing the native ancient scripts (baybayin), languages and dialects. Filipinos of all genders were able to obtain schooling and learning opportunities resulting in their education in the English language and a high literacy rating for a developing country like the Philippines. However, despite this advantage, grants and similar forms of funding were not immediately available to Philippine writers. Nevertheless, despite this lack of financial support for writers, many works in the Filipiniana style proliferated and were written dominantly in Philippine English, but fewer however saw print in the local maternal languages.

During the four-year Japanese occupation of the Philippines in the Second World War, the Japanese introduced the concept of "Asia for Asians," an idea that halted the proliferation of English as the language of literature in the Philippines because it sparked the publication and media broadcasts with the exclusive use of the vernacular or the "childhood languages" of Filipinos. This Japanese contribution to the Filipino's linguistic enlightenment reawakened the already existing move to lift the status of local languages as forms of literary expression prior to the introduction and propagation of English in the Filipino archipelago. The common "languages of childhood" of Filipinos, generally include Tagalog, Visayan, Hiligaynon, Cebuano and Ilocano, among others.

Still, despite the Filipino's reawakening of their "languages of childhood", the status of the English language returned and was elevated. The rejuvenation was due in part to the spread of English-based Philippine magazines in conjunction with the publication of serial "romantic and melodramatic" novels by women writers who wrote in their "mother tongue" through the pages of comics and magazines like Liwayway, Bannawag, Bulaklak, Aliwan and Tagumpay.

The competition between the use of English and Filipino as main modes of communication was unrelenting even after the end of World War II, the proclamation of Philippine Independence in 1946, and the official adoption of Filipino as a second official language other than English in 1987. The persistence of this competitive phenomenon was due to the close economic, military and cultural association of the Philippines to the United States, the encouragement of the use of English in combination with the dialects in schools and universities, and the need to gain a larger audience of readership. As a result, bilingualism - and even multilingualism - became the linguistic style and norm.

== Themes, character, and genre ==
Literature penned by women authors in the Philippines embraced the many realities and faces of Filipino society: the gap and the friction between the rich and the peasantry, personal experiences and dilemmas, love stories, their formative years, married life, employment; culture, beliefs, religion, rituals and tradition, womanhood, livelihood, family and motherhood, the duties of a female spouse; periods in history such as the Second World War, the war for Vietnam, the presence of the American military bases, nationalistic ideals and questions of cultural identity, the Marcos despotism, the EDSA revolution of 1986; poverty, prostitution, the effects of globalization and pollution, volunteer work, and the need to migrate for economic survival.

== Historical background ==
=== Precolonial to Spanish colonization ===
Prior to the surge of Spanish conquerors and colonizers, Filipino women were already creating and recording poetry using perishable materials such as banana leaves. Indigenous Filipino women were also singing tribal songs at a time when they enjoyed equal status to their male counterparts. They could own property, become rulers themselves in place of men, act as ritual leaders or babaylans, and had the right to divorce their husbands. In this sense, the Philippines was very similar to Spain, where the highest power was bestowed upon a woman. Both the founder of the Spanish nation (Isabella I of Castille and the highest ruler of Spain and the Philippines during the last years of the Spanish colonization (Isabella II of Spain) were women and held absolute power to lead the future of the nation.

Isabella II introduced the Education Decree of 1863 (10 years before Japan had a compulsory free modern public education and 40 years before the United States government started a free modern public school system in the Philippines) that provided for the establishment of at least two free primary schools: one for boys and another for girls in each town under the responsibility of the municipal government. That put the Philippines way ahead of others in Asia in offering education for women, indeed even ahead of some European countries.

Leona Florentino, a female poet who was the product of that public education system during the final moments of the 19th century, is now regarded as the "founder of women's literature" in the Philippines.

=== Revolution against Spain ===
During the final stages of the 19th century, Filipino women participated in the nationwide revolt against the governing Spaniards, although less prominently than their male counterparts. Among their role and contributions were "to influence" the state of affairs of an "emerging republic" and to claim equal opportunity in education, which includes learning the Spanish-language. An inspiring group of women who debated against and pushed for the eradication of discriminatory laws, particularly the right to be educated in schools, was the so-called "21 women from Malolos, Bulacan". Another would be Leona Florentino (1849–1884), who eventually became "the mother of Philippine women's literature", and who was also regarded as the conduit from "oral to literary tradition". Born in Vigan, Ilocos Sur, Florentino was a poet of Ilustrado background who wrote in Ilocano and Spanish. Her poems were recognized in Europe in 1889 following her untimely death.

=== American interlude ===
From the onset of the early years of the "benevolent" American occupation of the Philippine archipelago – after Spain lost control of the islands through war and opted to sell its Asian colony to the U.S. – the ambience was approving to the publication of vernacular literature which included the abundance of local magazines. Parallel to this, the United States of America established an English-based public education system. Women were able to study in schools, colleges, universities such as the University of the Philippines. Women were gradually beginning to regain equal footing with men, as it was during precolonial times. Women were able to publish works in their newly adopted language. During this European-Hispanic to Anglo-American linguistic transition, among the women who became active in creating Philippine literature in English were Paz Marquez Benitez, Paz M. Latorena, Estrella Alfon, Angela Manalang-Gloria, Genoveva Edroza-Matute, Loreto Paras-Sulit, Lilledeshan Bose, Cristina Pantoja-Hidalgo, and Lina Espina-Moore. Most of these literary pioneers also wrote simultaneously in the vernacular, although there were also those who became defiant and wrote exclusively in their mother tongue. An example of this was Magdalena Jalandoni, a Hiligaynon-language writer who was able to produce volumes of manuscripts. Among Jalandoni's 24 Hiligaynon novels, two were translated into English. Among those who excelled in both English and their local lingua franca was Lina Espina Moore, who became known as a forefront promoter of Cebuano literature. Moore's 1968 novel, Heart of the Lotus was the first Cebuano novel in the English language. Filipino women authors also became active participants in the development of Philippine media.

=== Japanese intervention ===
During World War II, the Japanese were able to influence and encourage the Philippine literati in developing the vernacular literature, in parallel existence with the English language introduced by the Americans through public education. The impact of this fellow-Asian intervention lingered through and survived after the Philippines achieved the status of a freely governing Republic. Exemplars are the Philippine-language works written by Lualhati Bautista and Liwayway Arceo. There were also published manuscripts that confer personal familiarity with events that occurred during the four-year-long Japanese period such as those achieved by Estrella Alfon, Maria Luna Lopez, and Rosa Henson.

=== Marcos and Martial Law years ===
The 20-year authoritarian rule of Ferdinand Marcos in the 1970s brought forth literary themes of cultural revolution, social awakening and political consciousness, reinvigorated nationalism, opinionated movements and protests, disapproval of the patriarchal society, and mass migration. Women writers began writing about the situations of female domestic helpers and slum dwellers employing their skills in both the vernacular and English. The purpose of writing also in the native language was to stimulate, educate and awaken the consciousness of the citizenry. Many writers were either "detained, tortured," or "killed." Among the women who became writers of this societal, political and activist genre were Gilda Cordero-Fernando and Ninotchka Rosca. Anti-Marcos movements, the "fiery texts" of writers, the People Power movement or the 1986 Edsa Revolution dislodged the despot from the seat of power, and was replaced by an elected first woman president, Corazon C. Aquino.

=== Modern-day challenges and status ===
Filipino women have been receiving recognition and support from non-governmental organizations, libraries, and other publishers, but despite the efforts of these organizations and the writers themselves, there are challenges that still confront Filipino women's literary careers. These include literary commercialism that prevents women writers from becoming parallel with so-called "esteemed authors", the struggle for additional acknowledgement of their status as writers, and obstacles related to economics.

== Migratory trends and movements ==
=== Migrant literature ===
One aspect of Filipino women's writings includes the production of the so-called "migratory literature," an account of how and why women had to leave their country in order to excel and express themselves through pen and print. In the 1930s, Filipino women authors opted to travel after obtaining the liberty to do so, and for other reasons such as the lack of a grant system within the confines of a developing country and the "resistance of a patriarchal society". But the exodus of Filipino female writers during the 1970s differed in purpose from that of the 1930s, because they left the country to survive economically and escape government persecution. One of the first voyager-writers was Paz Latorena.

The destinations of journeying migrant settlers were North America - primarily the United States – and Europe, Australia, Arab nations, Japan, Singapore and other Asian countries. In general, this "Great Migration" of Filipinos created "films, novels, short stories, poetry and comics" in the Philippines that portrayed wayfarers as economic heroes and heroines of the country.

Yet there were still some of those who chose to remain, instead of abandoning the Philippines, as in the case of Lilledeshan Bose; and there were also home-comers who, after traveling and staying abroad, returned to stay permanently, such as Cristina Pantoja-Hidalgo. Other authors of "migrant literature" are Marianne Villanueva, Nadine Sarreal and Edessa Ramos.

In addition, the Filipino settlers who founded Filipino communities in the United States of America triggered the generation of Filipino-American literature such as the works of female novelist Jessica Hagedorn. Migrant Filipino writers Linda Ty-Casper and Cecilia Manguerra Brainard stayed in the U.S., publishing for both Philippine and American readers.

== Recognition and support ==
Present-day associations that support, endorse, publish and collect works of Filipino women writers include the Ateneo Library of Women's Writings (ALIWW) of the Ateneo de Manila University, and the Philippine Center for Investigative Journalism, among other non-governmental organizations (NGOs) in the Philippines. Outside the country, there is the Philippine-Finnish Society in Helsinki, Finland.

Samples of published Filipino women's literature are Comfort Woman: Slave of Destiny by Rosa Henson published by the Philippine Center for Investigative Journalism, and Tulikärpänen - filippiiniläisiä novelleja or Firefly: Writings by Various Authors (Firefly: Filipina Short Stories) by Riitta Vartti sponsored by the Philippine-Finnish Society. Another non-governmental human rights organization publication is She Said No!, an anthology of stories.

The Ateneo Library of Women's Writings - a part of the Rizal Library at the Ateneo de Manila University and the first of its kind in Philippines - facilitates the collection, archiving, preservation, and promotion of Filipino women's literature about and written by Filipino women. The program includes the acquisition of related photographic material, and literary promotion are held through lectures, exhibitions, publications and book launchings. ALIWW holds the annual Paz Marquez-Benitez Memorial Lectures, a series of lectures established to honor Paz Marquez-Benitez who is considered the "matriarch of Filipino writers in English". This special program also assists in bringing to light Filipino women who excel in vernacular writings.

== See also ==
- Women in the Philippines
- Literature of the Philippines
- History of the Philippines
- Timeline of Philippine history
- The Thomasites
- Philippine English
- Philippine literature in English
- List of countries where English is an official language
- List of countries by English-speaking population
