= Cecilia Manguerra Brainard =

American novelist

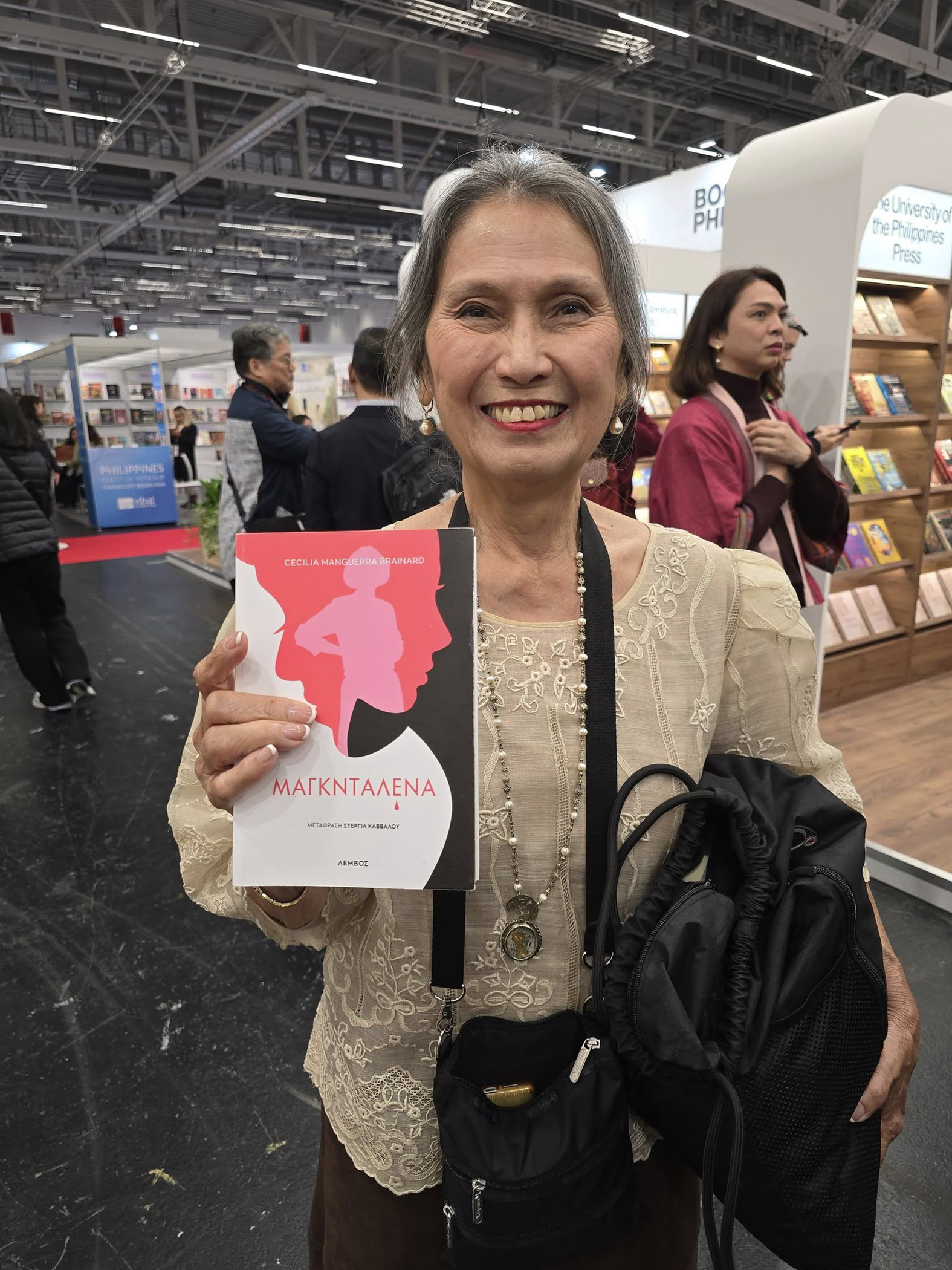
- Cecilia Brainard at the Frankfurt Book Fair 2025
- Born: 1947 (age 78–79); Cebu, Philippines
- Occupation: Filipino writer
- Notable work: When the Rainbow Goddess Wept
- Website: http://www.ceciliabrainard.com/

Cecilia Manguerra Brainard (born 1947) is an author and editor of 22 books. She co-founded PAWWA (Philippine American Women Writers and Artists) and also founded PALH (Philippine American Literary House). Brainard's works include the World War II novel, When the Rainbow Goddess Wept; The Newspaper Widow; Magdalena; and Selected Short Stories by Cecilia Manguerra Brainard, which won the 40th Philippine National Book Award and Cirilo Bautista Prize. These books have been translated into several languages. She edited several anthologies, including How I Became a Writer: Essays by Filipino and Filipino American Writers, Fiction by Filipinos in America, Contemporary Fiction by Filipinos in America, and three volumes of Growing Up Filipino, young adult books used by educators.

== Biography ==
Cecilia Manguerra Brainard (born 1947) grew up in Cebu City, Philippines, the youngest of four children to Concepcion Cuenco Manguerra and Mariano F. Manguerra. The death of her father when she was nine prompted her to begin writing, first in journals, then essays and fiction. She attended St. Theresa's College and Maryknoll College in the Philippines and completed graduate work at UCLA.

Brainard has received awards from the California State Senate(21st District), several USIS Grants, a California Arts Council Fellowship, an Outstanding Individual Award from the City of Cebu (Philippines), a Brody Arts Fund Award, a City of Los Angeles Cultural grant, and a Carlos Bulosan Book Club Award, among other. The books she has written and edited have also received awards, including the Philippine National Book Award, the Gintong Aklat Award, and the International Gourmand Award.

Brainard's second novel, Magdalena, inspired playwright Jocelyn Deona de Leon to write a stage play, Gabriela's Monologue, which was produced in 2011 by Bindlestiff Studio in San Francisco as part of Stories XII!, an annual production showcasing original works for the stage by Pilipino and Filipino American Artists.

Brainard's writings have appeared in periodicals such as CNN,Town and Country, Zee Lifestyle Magazine, Focus Philippines, Philippine Graphic, Amerasia Journal, Bamboo Ridge, among others. Her work has been anthologized in books including More Cebuano Than We Admit (Vibal 2022), Cherished (New World Library, 2011), Asian American Literature (Glencoe McGraw-Hill 2001), Pinay: Autobiographical Narratives by Women Writers, 1926-1998 (Ateneo, 2000), On a Bed of Rice (Anchor 1995), Songs of Ourselves (Anvil 1994), Making Waves (Beacon Press 1989), among others.

== Selected works ==
=== Novels and short story collections (writer) ===
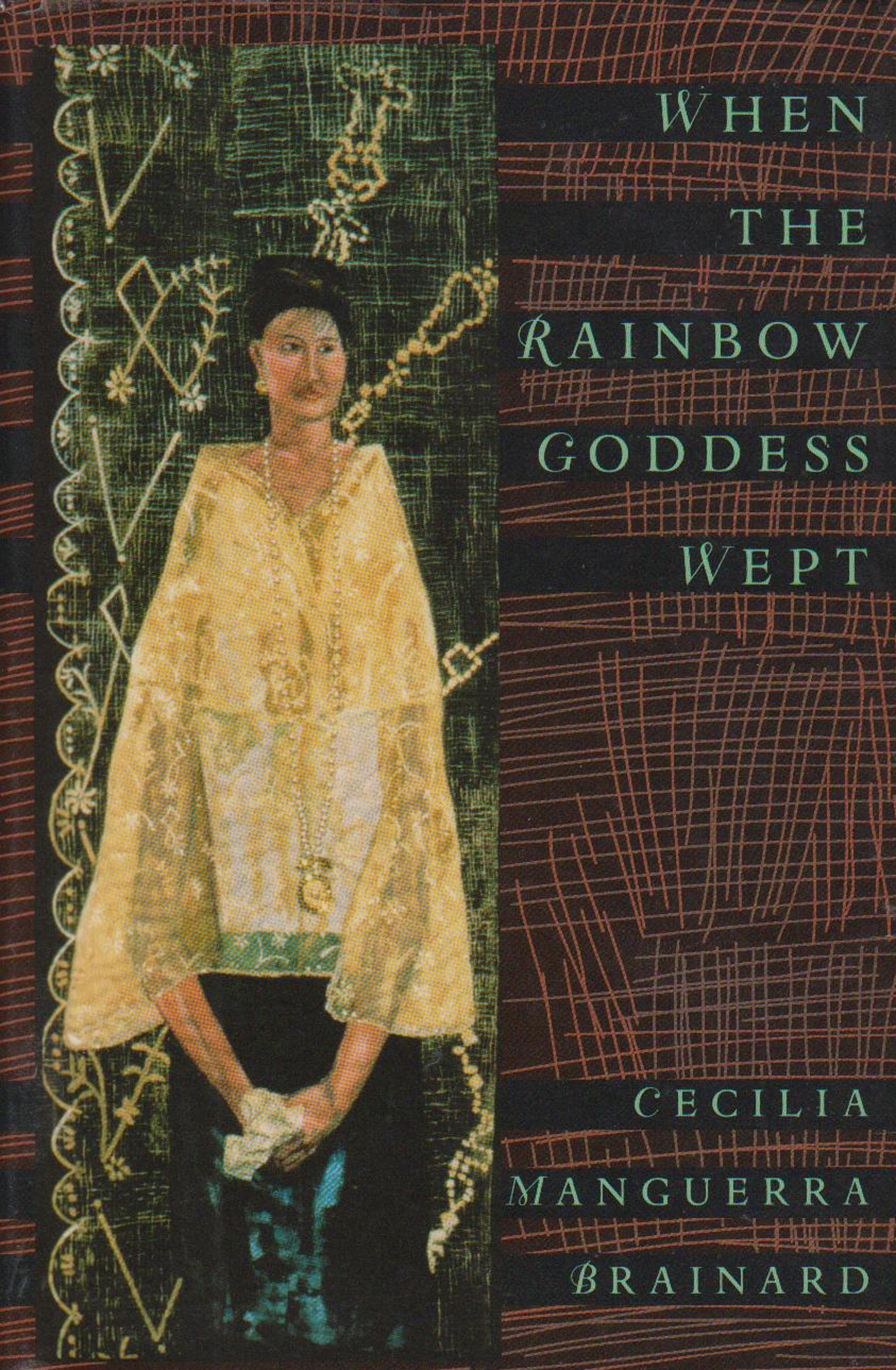
When the Rainbow Goddess Wept.

- Acapulco at Sunset and other Stories (short story collection, Anvil, 1995); (PALH/Philippine American Literary House, 2020)
- Angelica's Daughters, a Dugtungan Novel (a collaborative novel co-authored by Brainard, Cuizon, Evangelista, Montes, and Sarreal, Anvil, 2010)
- Magdalena (novel, Plain View Press, 2002); University of Santo Tomas Publishing House, 2016); (PALH/Philippine American Literary House, 2021)
- The Newspaper Widow (novel, University of Santo Tomas Publishing House, 2017); (PALH/Philippine American Literary House, 2021)
- Selected Short Stories by Cecilia Manguerra Brainard (short story collection, University of Santo Tomas Publishing House, 2021), (PALH/Philippine American Literary House, 2021).
- Vigan and other Stories (short story collection, Anvil, 2011)
- When the Rainbow Goddess Wept (novel, Dutton, 1994), which first appeared as Song of Yvonne; (New Day Publishers, 1991) (Plume paperback, 1995); (University of Michigan Press, 1999); (University of Santo Tomas Publishing House, 2019)
- Woman With Horns and Other Stories (short story collection, New Day Publishers, 1988; (PALH/Philippine American Literary House, 2020)

=== Short story collections (edited) ===
- Ala Carte Food and Fiction (Edited by Brainard and Orosa, Anvil, 2007)
- Asian and Philippine Folktales: Retellings by PAWWA, (Edited by Brainard, PALH, 2022)
- Contemporary Fiction by Filipinos in America (Anvil, 1998; PALH/Philippine American Literary House, 2021)
- Fiction by Filipinos in America (New Day, 1993); (PALH/Philippine American Literary House, 2020)
- Growing Up Filipino: Stories for Young Adults (PALH & Anvil, 2003)
- Growing Up Filipino II: More Stories for Young Adults (PALH, 2010)
- Growing Up Filipino 3: New Stories for Young Adults (University of Santo Tomas Publishing House, 2022; PALH/Philippine American Literary House, 2023)
- Seven Stories from Seven Sisters: A Collection of Philippine Folktales (Co-editor, PAWWA, 1992)
- The Beginning and Other Asian Folktales (Co-editor, PAWWA, 1995)

=== Non-fiction collections (edited) ===
- Behind the Walls: Life of Convent Girls (Edited by Brainard and Orosa, Anvil, 2005)
- Finding God: True Stories of Spiritual Encounters (Edited by Brainard and Orosa, Anvil, 2009)
- How I Became a Writer: Essays by Filipino and Filiino American Writers (Edited by Brainard, VIBAL Foundation, 2025)
- Journey of 100 Years: Reflections on the Centennial of Philippine Independence (Edited by Brainard and Litton, Anvil, PAWWA, 1999)
- Magnificat: Mama Mary's Pilgrim Sites (Edited by Brainard, Anvil, 2012; PALH/Philippine American Literary House, 2024)
- Step Into Our Kitchens: Theresian Recipes and Tales (Edited by Brainard, VIBAL Foundation, 2025)

=== Non-fiction (writer) ===
- Cecilia's Diary: 1962-1969 (memoir, Anvil, 2003)
- Fundamentals of Creative Writing (Anvil, 2009)
- Fundamentals of Creative Writing, Revised and Expanded Edition (PALH, 2024)
- Magical Years: Memories & Sketches (PALH, 2020)
- Out of Cebu: Essays and Personal Prose (personal essays,University of San Carlos Press, 2012)
- Philippine Woman in America (New Day Publishers, 1991)

=== In translation ===
- Magdalena (Translated into Arabic) (Egyptian Office for Publishing & Distribution, 2025)
- Magdalena (Translated into Greek) (Lemvos Editions, 2025)
- Magdalena (Translated into North Macedonian) (Bata Press, 2025)
- Magdalena (Translated into Portuguese by Isabela Figueira) (Editora Rua du Sabao, Brazil, 2026)
- Selected Short Stories by Cecilia Manguerra Brainard (Translated into North Macedonian) (Bata Press, 2025)
- Selected Short Stories by Cecilia Manguerra Brainard (Translated into Portuguese) (Editora Rua du Sabao, Brazil, 2025)
- The Newspaper Widow (Translated into Arabic) (Egyptian Office for Publishing & Distribution, 2025)
- The Newspaper Widow (Translated into North Macedonian) (Bata Press, 2025)
- The Newspaper Widow (Translated into Portuguese by Isabela Figueira) (Editora Rua du Sabao, Brazil, 2026)
- The Newspaper Widow (Translated into Serbian) (Agora, 2025)
- The Newspaper Widow (Translated into Slovenian) (Super založba, 2025)
- When the Rainbow Goddess Wept (Translated into Arabic) (Egyptian Office for Publishing & Distribution, 2025)
- When the Rainbow Goddess Wept (Translated into Azerbaijani) (Qanun Publishing House, 2026)
- When the Rainbow Goddess Wept (Translated into Japanese by Takuya Matsuda, Ph.D.) (Genki shobou, 2025)
- When the Rainbow Goddess Wept (Translated into North Macedonian) (Bata Press, 2025)
- When the Rainbow Goddess Wept (Translated into Portuguese by Isabela Figueira) (Editora Rua du Sabao, Brazil, 2025)
- When the Rainbow Goddess Wept (Translated into Turkish—Gokkusagi Tanricasi Agladigund—by Fusun Talay) (Bilge Kultur Sanat, 2001)

== Awards ==
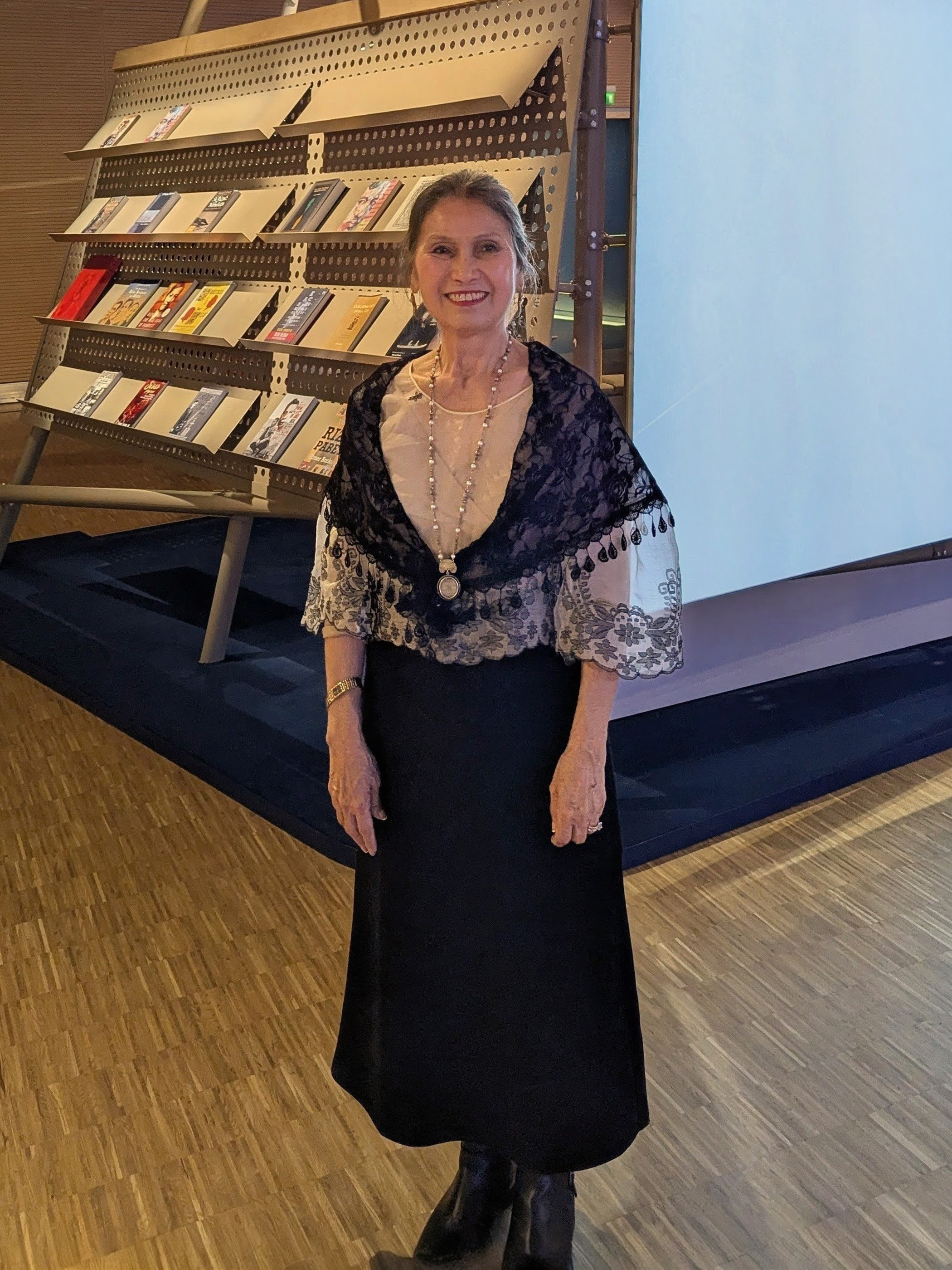
Writer at the Frankfurt Book Fair 2025

- Recipient 2026 Carlos Bulosan Book Club Award
- Recipient 2024 Travel Grant as part of the Philippine Delegation to the Frankfurt Book Fair from the National Book Development Board (NBDB) of the Philippines
- Winner 40th National Book Award, Best Book Short Fiction English, for Selected Short Stories by Cecilia Manguerra Brainard (2023)
- Winner Cirilo Bautista Prize for Selected Short Stories by Cecilia Manguerra Brainard (2023)
- Top Hat Award from the Philippine American Business Improvement and Development (2015)
- Certificate of Recognition from the United States House of Representatives (Juan Vargas) (2015)
- Gintong Aklat Award (Golden Book Award), for Finding God: True Stories of Spiritual Encounters (coeditor) (2009)
- Gourmand Award, for Ala Carte Food & Fiction (coeditor) (2008)
- Certificate of Recognition from the Cebu Provincial Government (2006)
- Amazing Alumni Achiever Award from Maryknoll College, QC, RP (2003)
- Certificate of Recognition from the California State Senate, 21st District (Jack Scott) (2001)
- Filipinas Magazine Achievement Award for Arts and Culture (2001)
- California State Summer School for the Arts Award (2000)
- Outstanding Individual Award from the City of Cebu, Philippines (1998)
- USIS Travel Lecture Grants (1995 & 1997)
- Makati Rotarian Award (1994)
- Literature Award, Filipino Women's Network (1992)
- City of Los Angeles Certificate of Appreciation (1992)
- Brody Arts Fund Fellowship (1991)
- Special Recognition Award, Los Angeles Board of Education (1991)
- City of Los Angeles Cultural Grant (1990–91)
- California Arts Council Artists' Fellowship in Fiction (1989–90)

== See also ==
- Estrella Alfon
- Carlos Bulosan
- Linda Ty Casper
- N.V.M. Gonzalez
- Jessica Hagedorn
- Caroline Hau
- Tess Uriza Holthe
- F.Sionil Jose
- Resil Mojares
- Lina Espina-Moore
- Jose Rizal
- Ninotchka Rosca
- E. San Juan, Jr.
- Hope Sabanpan-Yu
- Bienvenido Santos
- Miguel Syjuco

== Other sources ==
- Abao, Jane Frances P. 2001. "Retelling the Stories, Rewriting the Bildungsroman: Cecilia Manguerra Brainard's When the Rainbow Goddess Wept ." Humanities Diliman (January–June).
- Adler, Les. 1996. "Acapulco at Sunset and Other Stories: A Review." Pilipinas 26 (Spring).
- Alexice, Mya. Book Review of "The Newspaper Widow" - Foreword Reviews, January/February 2018.
- Anonas-Carpio, Alma. "The Tremendous Power of Secrets." Philippines Graphic. March 2, 2018.
- Aubry, Erin. "A Child's Vision of Life During Wartime." Los Angeles Times. November 15, 1994, E-8.
- Bautista, Veltisezar. "Brainard, Cecilia Manguerra: Award-Winning Writer." The Filipino Americans (1763-Present): Their History, Culture and Traditions. BookHaus Publishers, 1998 & 2002, 188-189.
- Beltran, Marie G. "Woman With Horns and Other Concerns." Filipinas (May 1995): 29, 56.
- Campomanes, Oscar V. 2012. "Cecilia Manguerra Brainard, Scenographer." Introduction of Cecilia Manguerra Brainard's Vigan and Other Stories (2012).
- Casper, Leonard. "BACK-AZIMUTH Filipino Writers Abroad." Kinaadman XXVII (2005): 69-82.
- Casper, Leonard. Rev. of Song of Yvonne, Philippine Studies 41 (2nd Quarter 1993): 251-54.
- Cruz, Isagani R. "The Pleasures of Ubec, Otherwise Known as Cebu." Starweek: The Sunday Magazine of the Philippine Star (October 29, 1995): 20.
- Cruz, Jhoanna Lynn. "Cecilia Manguerra Brainard's Fiction: Bridging Distances". Likha, Vol. 15, No. 1, 1994-1995: 14-22.
- Cvij, Anddelka. "Journalist" (Review of Serbian translation of Brainard's novel The Newspaper Widow). "Vecernje novosti, Kultura", May 22, 2026, p. 19.
- Diores, Luis. "Cecilia Manguerra-Brainard: Fiction is Organic to me." Kulokabildo: Dialogues with Cebuano Writers Ed. Yu, Hope S. University of San Carlos Cebuano Studies Center, 2009, 125-132.
- Grice, Helen. "Artistic Creativity, Form, and Fictional Experimentation in Filipina American Fiction." MELUS: The Journal of the Society for the Study of the Multi-Ethnic Literature of the United States 29.1 (2004): 181-198.
- Grow, L. M. "Brainard, Cecilia Manguerra (1947-)".The Greenwood Encyclopedia of Asian American Literature. Ed. Guiyou Huang. Westport, Connecticut: Greenwood Press, 2009, 100-104.
- Lauron, Cheryl Grace Palang. "The Adolescent Filipino in Cecilia Manguerra Brainard's Select Short Fictions: Learning Activities." MA Education Thesis, Cebu Technological University, 2015.
- Lim Jr., Paulino (2012), "Diplotic (Double Vision) Consciousness of Overseas Filipino Writers." A Paper delivered at the Ninth International Conference on the Philippines, Oct 28-30, 2012 at Michigan State University, page 5.
- Magan, Rhodora G. "Cecilia Manguerra Brainard's Oriental Oriental "Magdalena": A Linguistic Reinvention." GSTF Journal of Law and Social Sciences (JLSS) Vol. 4, No. 2, 2015.
- Magan, Rhodora G. "Eve and Her Beings: A Chopin-Brainard Simulation." A Paper delivered at the Asian Conference on Literature & Librarianship, April 2–5, 2015 in Osaka, Japan.
- Melnick, Lisa Suguitan. "An Enjoyable Period Piece." Positively Filipino. March 27, 2018.
- Pieri, Caterina E. (2003). "Tesi di Laurea: When the Rainbow Goddess Wept di Cecilia Manguerra Brainard." MA in English, Literary Translation Thesis, Universita di Torino, Italy.
- Rafols, Margarita. 2010. "Hide and Seek: Redefining 'Filipino' in Cecilia Manguerra Brainard's Fiction by Filipinos in America (1993) and Contemporary Fiction by Filipinos in America (1997)." BA Literature Thesis, Ateneo de Manila University.
- Rimando, Ruth S. (2006). "Foregrounding Myths and Legends in Cecilia Manguerra Brainard's When the Rainbow Goddess Wept." BA. Literature Thesis, University of Santo Tomas.
- Wigley, John Jack (2004). "Representations of the Female Body in Cecilia Manguera Brainard's Fiction." MA Literature Thesis, University of Santo Tomas.
- Wigley, John Jack. "From Waxing to Waning: Woman's Psychosexual Development in Selected Short Stories of Cecilia Manguerra Brainard and Michelle Cruz Skinner." Inter/Sections (February 18, 2008):48-49.
- Ty, Eleanor. "Cecilia Manguerra Brainard. Asian American Novelists: A Bio-Bibliographical Critical Sourcebook. Ed. Emmanuel S. Nelson. Westport, Connecticut: Greenwood Press, 2000, 29-33.
- Ty, Eleanor. "'Never Again Be the Yvonne of Yesterday': Personal and Collective Loss in Cecilia Brainard's Song of Yvonne." In Writing Dispossession, Writing Desire: Asian-American Women Writers. Ed. Srimati Mukherjee.
- Ty, Eleanor. "The Politics of the Visible in Asian North American Narratives", Toronto: University of Toronto Press, ISBN 978-0802086044.
