= List of Filipino women writers =

This is a list of women writers who were born in the Philippines or whose writings are closely associated with that country.

== A ==
- Mila D. Aguilar (1949–2023), poet, essayist, educator
- Erlinda K. Alburo (active since 1970s), poet, Cebuano scholar
- Estrella Alfon (1917–1983), short story writer, playwright, journalist
- Cora Almerino (active since 1990s), poet
- Mia Alvar (active since 1999), short story writer
- Ivy Alvarez (active since 2000), poet, editor, reviewer
- Encarnacion Alzona (1895–2001), historian, educator, suffragist
- Liwayway Arceo (1920–1999), novelist, journalist, radio scriptwriter

== B ==
- Felisa Batacan (active since the 1990s), journalist, novelist, short story writer
- Lualhati Bautista (1945–2023), novelist
- Merlinda Bobis (born 1959), playwright, short story writer, novelist
- Cecilia Manguerra Brainard (born 1947), novelist, short story writer, non-fiction writer

== C ==
- Linda Ty Casper (born 1931), novelist, short story writer
- Lourdes Castrillo Brillantes (active since 1980s), Spanish-language writer, educator
- Martha Cecilia (1953–2014), romance novelist
- Arlene J. Chai (born 1955), Filipino-Chinese-Australian novelist
- Josefina Constantino (1920–2024), essayist, critic, poet, nun
- Gilda Cordero-Fernando (1930–2020), publisher, short story writer, non-fiction writer
- Sheila Coronel (active since 2003), journalist, educator
- Conchitina Cruz (active since 1998), poet, educator
- Elaine Castillo (born 1984), novelist, essayist

== D ==
- Ophelia Alcantara Dimalanta (1932–2010), poet, editor, playwright, educator

== E ==
- Lina Espina-Moore (1919–2000), Cebuano short story writer, novelist
- Damiana Eugenio (1921–2014), folklorist, educator
- Marjorie Evasco (born 1953), poet, feminist

== F ==
- Lina Flor (1914–1976), radio scriptwriter, columnist, biographer
- Leona Florentino (1849–1884), poet writing in Spanish and Ilocano

== G ==
- Candy Gourlay (born 1962), journalist, children's writer
- Evelyn May Guinid (born 1971), romance novelist
- Adelina Gurrea (1896–1971), journalist, poet, romance novelist, children's writer
- Evangelina Guerrero (1904–1949), journalist, poet, short story writer

== H ==
- Jessica Hagedorn (born 1949), Filipino-American playwright, novelist, mixed-media artist
- Rosa Henson (1927–1997), autobiographer
- Margie Holmes (active since 1973), non-fiction writer, columnist, popular psychologist
- Cristina Pantoja-Hidalgo (born 1944), non-fiction writer, fictionist, and professor

== I ==
- Luisa Aguilar Igloria (born 1961), Filipino-American poet

== J ==
- Magdalena Jalandoni (1891–1978), autobiographer, poet, novelist, short story writer
- Armie Jarin-Bennett (active since 1980s), journalist, television presenter, executive CNN director
- Rina Jimenez-David (1955–2023), journalist, columnist

== K ==
- Karen Kunawicz (active since 1990s), poet, journalist, columnist, broadcaster

== L ==
- Daisy López (active since 2000s), poet, short story writer, journalist, columnist
- Marra Lanot (active since 1970s), poet, short story writer, educator

== M ==
- Melba Padilla Maggay (born 1951), social anthropologist, journalist, non-fiction writer
- Angela Manalang-Gloria (1907–1995), poet
- Paz Márquez-Benítez (1894–1983), short story writer
- Genoveva Matute (1915–2009), short story writer
- Armine Rhea Mendoza (active since the 1990s), romance novelist
- Hilda Montaire (1922–2004), short story writer, novelist
- Virginia R. Moreno (1923–2021), poet, playwright, film director

== O ==
- Maria Odulio de Guzman (born 1895), lexicographer
- Gilda Olvidado (born 1957), novelist, scriptwriter

== P ==
- Loreto Paras-Sulit (1908–2008), short story writer
- Elena Patron (1933–2021), Tagalog columnist, comics writer, novelist
- Kerima Polotan Tuvera (1925–2011), short story writer, novelist, essayist

== R ==
- Soledad Reyes (born 1946), novelist, essayist
- Sophia Romero (active since 1998), novelist
- Ninotchka Rosca (born 1946), novelist, non-fiction writer

== S ==
- Michelle Cruz Skinner (born 1965), short story writer, educator
- Maria Teresa Cruz San Diego (active since 1992), romance novelist
- Miriam Defensor Santiago (1945–2016), politician, non-fiction writer
- Pura Santillan-Castrence (1905–2007), essayist, columnist, diplomat
- Lakambini Sitoy (born 1969), novelist, short story writer, journalist, educator

== T ==
- Eileen Tabios (born 1960), poet, novelist, publisher
- Gina Marissa Tagasa-Gil (active since 1980s), scriptwriter for television, film
- Trinidad Tarrosa-Subido (1912–1994), linguist, poet
- Edith Tiempo (1919–2011), poet, novelist, short story writer
- Rowena Tiempo Torrevillas (born 1951), poet, novelist, essayist

== U ==
- Azucena Grajo Uranza (1929–2012), novelist, short story writer, playwright

== Z ==
- Jessica Zafra (born 1965), essayist, columnist
