= Evelyn May Guinid =

Filipino author

Eve Montelibano
- Born: 1971 (age 54–55)
- Occupation: Author

Eve Montelibano (born 1971) is a Filipino author of Tagalog popular romance novels in the Philippines. She is the bestselling author of the Lothario romance book series.

== Biography ==
Eve Montelibano was born in 1971. She graduated from the University of the Philippines in Diliman, Quezon City. An interior designer and teacher by profession, Guinid is also a painter who is active in local visual arts guild activities and a member of a theatre group. She was one of the founders the Love Match brand of Tagalog pocketbooks, a paperback line that she cofounded after writing for Precious Hearts Romances (PHR). She started the Lothario series when she was in her 20s. As a writer, Guinid draws inspiration from the personal experiences of others as well as her own, in order to inspire her readers.

== See also ==
- Armine Rhea Mendoza
- Babes Cajayon
- Maria Teresa Cruz San Diego
- Lualhati Bautista
