= Aklatang Bayan =

Philippine literary association

- Formation: 1910; 116 years ago
- Founded at: Tondo, Manila
- Official language: Tagalog

Aklatang Bayan was a Philippine literary society established in 1910. Its primary objective was to support the Tagalog language. The organization contributed to the standardization of Tagalog and advocated for its recognition as the basis of the national language of the Philippines. It left a mark on the history of Tagalog literature by organizing the first balagtasan in 1924.

== History and activities ==
Aklatang Bayan was founded in 1910 in Tondo, Manila, and continued its operations until the onset of World War II. Its first chairman was Rosauro Almario, succeeded in 1915 by Precioso Palma. From 1922 until his death in 1947, Julián Cruz Balmaceda served as its leader. The society was among several literary organizations that emerged in the Philippine archipelago under American rule, especially in Manila and nearby areas. It emerged as a prominent institution in Philippine literary circles due to its membership of numerous influential figures, many of whom were also engaged in political activities. Its main rival was Ilaw at Panitik, founded in 1912 and aligned with Tagalog romantic traditions. In 1935, it encountered further competition from the modernist Kapisanang Panitikan, established by Clodualdo del Mundo and Alejandro G. Abadilla.

The main mission of Aklatang Bayan was to advance the Tagalog language and the cultural heritage derived from it. This objective was achieved through diverse activities, including the sponsorship of poetry contests that, in the prevailing custom of the period, typically involved recitation rather than the submission of original works. Each year, on the anniversary of the birth of Francisco Balagtas, known as the preeminent poet in the Tagalog tradition, members convened in a designated town to conduct cultural programs. Commemorations were likewise extended to other distinguished contributors to Tagalog literature, such as Marcelo H. del Pilar and Andrés Bonifacio.

Members contributed poetry, short fiction, essays, and novels to Tagalog-language publications, such as Taliba, Ang Mithi, Pagkakaisa, and Watawat. The society further supported the development of innovative literary forms anchored in indigenous Philippine aesthetics. It organized the first balagtasan in 1924, a native Philippine genre in the form of a poetic debate.

Members of Aklatang Bayan actively engaged in debates within the Philippine intelligentsia during the early 20th century. In its rivalry with Ilaw at Panitik, the society generally adopted traditionalist and conservative stances. These positions did not reflect a rejection of modernity or an unquestioning adherence to tradition, but rather opposition to increasing American cultural influence and a commitment to fostering Filipino nationalism. The society frequently invoked themes from the Philippine Revolution and expressed strong support for the designation of Tagalog as the national language at the 1935 Constitutional Convention. These advocacy efforts contributed to the desired effect on 31 December 1937, when President Manuel L. Quezon declared the national language to be based on Tagalog. Following Philippine independence in 1946 – after the society had largely ceased operations – the language was officially renamed Filipino.

Despite its emphasis on societal service, Aklatang Bayan occasionally faced criticism for perceived elitism. Notable members included Lope K. Santos, Carlos Ronquillo, Faustino Aguilar, Severino Reyes, Iñigo Ed. Regalado, Hermenegildo Cruz, and Patricio Mariano.

== Significance ==
Aklatang Bayan occupies a recognized position in Philippine history as the first literary society in the country. Its contributions extend beyond establishing an organizational model for native writers and poets. Members played an important role in the standardization of the Tagalog language, particularly through the formulation of accepted grammatical norms and rules for its modern usage. These efforts helped solidify Tagalog's central role in the multilingual and multicultural context of Philippine society.
