= List of renamed streets in Metro Manila =

This is a partial list of streets or roads in Metro Manila, Philippines, that underwent a name change in the past.

== Background ==
Many place names in the country were changed after the islands achieved full sovereignty in 1946, following nearly four centuries of colonial occupation. Motorways named after Spanish and American colonists were subsequently altered to those of Filipino nationalist leaders and figures. This practice continued with the adoption of Tagalog (via its standardised register, Filipino) as the country's official national language.

Recently, streets have been renamed more aggressively after deceased or incumbent politicians, influential businessmen, and their relatives, which Filipino historian Gregorio F. Zaide described as a product of "bigoted nationalism" and "jingoism" done by self-serving public officials without regard to their historical significance.

== City of Manila ==
This list is incomplete; you can help by expanding it.

Original name	New name	District	Coordinates
Calle Aceiteros	M. de Santos Street	San Nicolás	14.60216°N 120.96903°E
Calle Aduana / Calle Clavería	Soriano Avenue	Intramuros	14.59270°N 120.97307°E
Calle Agno	F. A. Reyes Street	Malate	14.56764°N 120.99192°E
Calle Alburquerque	Raja Matanda Street	Tondó	14.60690°N 120.96830°E
Calle Alejandro VI (Calle del General Camba)	De los Santos Street	San Miguel	14.60284°N 120.99085°E
Calle Alix / Plaza de Santa Ana / Calle Concordia	Legarda Street	Sampaloc–Quiapo	14.60087°N 120.99514°E
Calle Almansa	Florentino Torres Street	Binondo	14.60196°N 120.98056°E
Calle Andalucía	Alfonso Mendoza Street	Sampáloc	14.61072°N 120.98628°E
Calle Angyahan	Felix Huertas Road	Santa Cruz	
Calle Anloague / Calle de Joló / Calle Lemeri / Calle Caronel (Route 51)	Juan Luna Street	Tondó	14.60457°N 120.97095°E
Calle Arkansas	Engracia Cruz-Reyes Street	Ermita	14.57946°N 120.98215°E
Calle Arranque / 2° Calle Timbugan	Teodora Alonzo Street	Binondo	14.60662°N 120.97962°E
Calle Arroceros	Antonio Villegas Street	Ermita	14.59070°N 120.98189°E
Calle Avilés (Calle Malacañan / Calzada Uliuli)	José Laurel Street	San Miguel	14.59436°N 120.99352°E
Calle Azcárraga (Paseo de Azcárraga / Calle del Gral Izquierdo / Calle Paz / Calzada de Bilibid / Calzada de Iris) (Paseo de Azcárraga / Calle Nueva / Calle del General Izquierdo / unnamed road / Calle de San Bernaldo / Calzada de Yris)	Recto Avenue	Binondo–Santa Cruz–Quiapo	14.60387°N 120.98083°E
Calle Bagumbayan (Paseo de las Aguadas) (Paseo de Vidal) (Calzada)	Padre Burgos Avenue	Ermita	14.58976°N 120.98072°E
Calle Bálic-Bálic	Gerardo Tuazon Street	Sampáloc	14.60876°N 121.00378°E
Calle Bancusay	Varona Street	Tondó	14.61643°N 120.96578°E
Calle Barbosa	Bautista Street	Quiapo	14.59728°N 120.98441°E
Calle Batangas	A. Lorenzo Jr. Street	Santa Cruz	
Calle Bilibid	Bilibid Viejo Street	Quiapo	
Calle Buenavista	Victorino Mapa Street	Santa Mesa	14.3610°N 121.0590°E
Calle Bustillos	J. Figueras Street	San Miguel	14.60195°N 120.99277°E
Calle Bustillos	Manrique Street	San Miguel	
Calle California	Escoda Street	Paco	14.57873°N 120.99038°E
Calle Camarines	Herrera Street	Santa Cruz	14.61809°N 120.98329°E
Calle Canónigo	President Quirino Avenue Extension	Paco	
Calle Carolina	Madre Ignacia Street	Malate	14.56883°N 120.98593°E
Calle Castaños	Lardizabal Street	Sampáloc	
Calle Cataluña	Tolentino Street	Sampáloc	14.60736°N 120.98781°E
Calle Cerrada	San Juan de Letrán Street	Intramuros	
Calle Chicago (Street)	A. C. Delgado Street	Port Area	14.59051°N 120.96655°E
Calle Colorado	Felipe Agoncillo Street	Malate	14.57547°N 120.99048°E
Calle Concepción	Natividad Almeda-López Street	Ermita	14.59040°N 120.98385°E
Calle Condesa	Norberto Ty Street	Binondo	14.60075°N 120.97526°E
Calle Constancia	R. Cristóbal Street	Sampáloc	14.61226°N 120.99557°E
Calle Dagonoy	F. Torres Street	San Andrés	14.57268°N 121.00504°E
Calle Dakota	Adriatico Street	Malate	14.56889°N 120.98682°E
Calle Dart / Dart East	Angel Linao Street	Paco	14.57581°N 120.99417°E
Calle David	Burke Street	Binondo	14.59850°N 120.97930°E
Calle de Almacenes	Maestranza Street	Intramuros	
Calle de Barberos	Urdaneta Street	Intramuros	
Calle de Concepción (Calle Martín Ocampo) (Quezon Avenue) (Mulawen Boulevard)	Quezon Boulevard	Quiapo	14.60105°N 120.98456°E
Calle de Echagüe	Valderrama Street	San Nicolás	
Calle de la Bomba	Legaspi Street	Intramuros	
Calle de la Escuela	(Calle de la) Victoria Street	Intramuros	
Calle de la Paisana	(Calle) San Antón Street	Sampáloc	
Calle del Baluarte / Calle Fundición	Muralla Street	Intramuros	
Calle del Hospital	Cabildo Street (NW of Soriano Avenue)	Intramuros	
Calle del Rondín	(Calle) Numancia Street	San Nicolás	
Calle de Pelota	Trinidad Street	Quiapo	
Calle de Quesada	J. Nolasco Street	Tondó	
Calle de San Casiano	San Marcelino Street (between Canal de Balete and General Luna Street)	Ermita-Paco	
Calle de Santa Mónica	Salcepuedes Street	Ermita	
Calle de Santa Rosa (Calle El Dorado) (Calle Regidor) (Quezon Avenue) (Mulawen Boulevard)	Quezon Boulevard	Quiapo	14.59701°N 120.99480°E
Calle de Santa Rosa	Urbiztondo Street	San Nicolás	
Calle de Vives	Roxas Bridge	Port Area/Intramuros–San Nicolás	
Calle Díaz	Benavidez Street (N of Recto Avenue)	Binondo	
Calle Divisoria	Salas Street	Ermita	14.57475°N 120.98149°E
Calle Dulumbayan / Calle Salcedo / Calle Cervantes / Calzada de San Lázaro (Avenida Rizal)	Rizal Avenue	Santa Cruz	14.61433°N 120.98264°E
Calle Echagüe (Market Street)/ Calle del Rosario	Carlos Palanca Sr. Street	Quiapo	14.59810°N 120.98208°E
Calle Encarnación	Asunción Street (NW of C. M. de Santos Street)	San Nicolás	
Calle Economía	Vicente Cruz Street	Sampáloc	14.60738°N 120.99919°E
Calle Evangelista	M. Natividad Street	Santa Cruz	14.62058°N 120.98338°E
Calle Fapeleta	Espeleta Street	Binondo	14°36'02.2"N 120°58'39.1"E
Calle Farol	Magallanes Street	Intramuros	
Calle Florida (Calle San Antonio)	María Y. Orosa Street	Ermita–Malate	14.57217°N 120.98675°E
Calle Folgueras / Calle Acuña	Carmen Planas Street	Tondó-San Nicolás	14.60545°N 120.96785°E
Calle Fonda	Solano Street	Intramuros	
Calle Gándara / Pasaje Nozagaray (Calle Gándara / Calle San Agustín)	Sabino Padilla Street	Santa Cruz	14.60173°N 120.97726°E
Calle Gallera	Arquiza Street	Ermita	
Calle Gardenia	Gen. Gerónimo Street	Sampáloc	14.60556°N 120.99743°E
Calle Gastambide (Calle de Lacorzana)	Dalupan Street	Sampáloc	14.60277°N 120.99036°E
Calle Gavey	San Vicente Street (between Quintín Paredes Street and Yuchengco Street)	Binondo	
Calle Georgia	Luis Ma. Guerrero Street	Malate	14.57227°N 120.98763°E
Calle Guipit	Santa Teresita Street	Sampáloc	14.60199°N 120.99778°E
Calle Herrán (Calzada de Herrán / Calle Real / Carretera de Santa Ana) (Calle Real de Paco)	Pedro Gil Street	Ermita–Paco–Santa Ana	14.57900°N 121.00263°E
Calle Indiana	Pilar Hidalgo Lim Street	Malate	14.57333°N 120.98888°E
Calle Inviernes (Street)	Dr. M. L. Carreón Street	Santa Ana	14.58403°N 121.00644°E
Calle Isaac Peral (Calle Cortafuegos)	United Nations Avenue	Ermita–Paco	14.58248°N 120.98472°E
Calle Isabel (Street)	F. Cayco Street	Sampáloc	14.60557°N 120.99459°E
Calle Kansas (Avenue)	F. T. Benítez Street	Malate	14.57521°N 120.99231°E
Calle Lepanto / Calle Juan de Juanes	S. H. Loyola Street	Quiapo-Sampáloc	14.61109°N 120.99669°E
Calle Lipa	M. F. Jhocson Street	Sampáloc	14.60160°N 120.99601°E
Calle Looban (Carmen Street)	Mahatma Gandhi Street	Paco	14.58065°N 120.99136°E
Calle Luengo	Quirino Avenue (Plaza Dilao - Mabini Bridge)	Pandacan	
Calle Magdalena / Calle San José	Bambang Street / G. Masangkay Street	Santa Cruz-Tondó-Binondo	14.60759°N 120.97812°E
Calle Malecón (Paseo de Santa Lucía) (Paseo de María Cristina)	Bonifacio Drive	Port Area	14.58757°N 120.97297°E
Calle Manicninc	Aguilar Street	Tondó-Binondo	
Calle Mangahan	P. Guevarra Street	Santa Cruz	14.61190°N 120.98519°E
Calle Manúguit	Abad Santos Avenue	Tondó	14.3747°N 120.5845°E
Calle Marina	Guerrero Street	Ermita	
Calle Marqués de Comillas	D. Romuáldez, Sr. Street	Ermita	14.58751°N 120.98688°E
Calle Marquez	San Rafael Street	Quiapo	
Calle Melba	Doroteo José Street	Santa Cruz	14.60523°N 120.98084°E
Calle Mendoza	Z. P. de Guzmán Street	Quiapo	14.60062°N 120.98507°E
Calle Militar	J. Quintos, Sr. Street	Malate	14.57231°N 120.98269°E
Calle Misericordia (1° Calle Timbugan / Calle Misericordia / Pasaje Obando)	Tomás Mapúa Street	Santa Cruz	14.60777°N 120.98116°E
Calle Morga	Tayuman Street	Santa Cruz–Tondó	14.61666°N 120.97808°E
Calle Morayta	Nicanor Reyes Street	Sampáloc	14.60420°N 120.98774°E
Calle Nebraska	Jorge Bocobo Street	Malate	14.57927°N 120.98178°E
Calle Negros	Kusang Loób Street	Santa Cruz	14.60662°N 120.98006°E
Calle Noria	P. Paterno Street	Quiapo	14.59969°N 120.98285°E
Calle Novaliches	Nicanor Padilla Street	San Miguel	14.59262°N 120.98941°E
Calle Nozaleda (Calzada de Paco / Calle Nueva) (South Road)	General Luna Street	Paco	14.58065°N 120.98846°E
Calle Nueva / Calle de Bagur	E. T. Yuchengco Street	Binondo	14.60015°N 120.97582°E
Calle Nueva (Camino Real)	A. Mabini Street	Ermita–Malate	14.57138°N 120.98416°E
Calle O'Donell	Severino Reyes Street	Santa Cruz	14.60199°N 120.98579°E
Calle Observatorio	Padre Faura Street	Ermita	14.57867°N 120.98372°E
Calle Oregon	G. Apacible Street	Paco	14.58093°N 120.99208°E
Calle Oriente	V. Tytana Street	Binondo	14.60086°N 120.97443°E
Calle Otis	María Paz Mendoza Guazon Street	Paco	14.58885°N 120.99670°E
Calle Pennsylvania	León Guinto Street	Malate	14.57285°N 120.99112°E
Calle Pepín	J. Marzán Street	Sampáloc	14.61032°N 120.99589°E
Calle Pescadores / Calle Sagunto (Calle Real de Tondo)	Santo Cristo Street (NW of C. M. de Santos Street)	Tondó-San Nicolás	14.60497°N 120.96688°E
Calle Pinpin	(Calle) Pitóng Gatang Street	Tondó	
Calle Príncipe	Del Pan Street	San Nicolás	14.59882°N 120.96669°E
Calle Quezon	P. Noval Street	Sampáloc	
Calle Quiricada	Juan Nolasco Street (N of Moriones Street)	Tondo	
Calle Quiotan	Sales Street	Santa Cruz	14.60037°N 120.98255°E
Calle Raón / Calle Centeno / Calle Alcala	Gonzalo Puyat Street	Quiapo-Santa Cruz	14.60090°N 120.98205°E
Calle Real	Del Pilar Street	Ermita–Malate	14.57231°N 120.98269°E
Calle Real del Palacio (Calle del Palacio)	General Luna Street	Intramuros	14.58969°N 120.97479°E
Calle Real del Parián	Real Street	Intramuros	14.59059°N 120.97606°E
Calle Recogidas	Anda Street	Intramuros	
Calle Remedios	Sinagoga Street	Malate	
Calle Requesens	E. Remigio Street	Santa Cruz	14.60961°N 120.98316°E
Calle Reyna Cristina	Reina Regente Street	Binondo	
Calle Rosario	Quintín Paredes Street	Binondo	14.59822°N 120.97582°E
Calle Sacristía / Calle Lacoste / Calle Enrile	Ongpin Street	Binondo	14.60143°N 120.97650°E
Calle Salinas	Elcano Street	San Nicolás	
Calle San Jerónimo	Arlegui Street	San Miguel	14.59652°N 120.98951°E
Calle San Jacinto / Calle de Melisa	Tomás Pinpin Street	Binondo	14.59950°N 120.97756°E
Calle San José / Calle San Rafael	Alhambra Street	Ermita	
Calle San José	San Gregorio Street	Paco	
Calle San Juan de Dios	Legazpi Street (between Real Street and San Francisco Street)	Intramuros	
Calle San Luis	Kalaw Avenue	Ermita	14.58159°N 120.98046°E
Calle San Pedro	Evangelista Street	Santa Cruz	14.60207°N 120.98360°E
Calle San Roque	P. Gómez Street	Quiapo	
Calle San Sebastián / Calle del General Crespo	R. Hidalgo Street	Quiapo	14.59897°N 120.98762°E
Calle Sande	N. Zamora Street	Tondó	14.61112°N 120.96832°E
Calle Sangleyes	Blumentritt Road	Santa Cruz–Sampáloc	14.62168°N 120.99498°E
Calle Santiago	Lopez Jaena Street	Paco	
Calle Sobriedad	F. Jhocson	Sampáloc	
Calle Soledad	Camba Street (NW of C. M. de Santos Street)	San Nicolás	
Calle Soledad / Calle Olivares / Calle Turco	Dasmariñas Street (between Muelle de Binondo and Yuchengco Street)	Binondo	
Calle Tanduay / Calle Romero Aquino / Ayala	J. Nepomuceno Street	Quiapo	14.59262°N 120.98970°E
Calle Tayabas	Francis P. Yuseco Street	Santa Cruz–Tondó	14.61936°N 120.98184°E
Calle Tebuan	Tetuan Street	Binondo	
Calle Tennessee	Gen. M. Malvar Street	Malate	14.57512°N 120.98970°E
Calle Trabajo	M. Dela Fuente Street	Sampáloc	14.60741°N 120.99816°E
Calle Trozo (Calle Magdalena)	Bambáng Street	Santa Cruz	14.61107°N 120.98133°E
Calle Tuberías (Calle del Tubo)	Dr. Concepción C. Aguila Street	San Miguel–Quiapo	14.59742°N 120.98867°E
Calle Unión	F. M. Gernale Street	Paco	14.57943°N 120.99655°E
Calle Vermont	Julio Nakpil Street	Malate	14.57458°N 120.99116°E
Calle Vito Cruz (Street)	Pablo Ocampo Street	Malate	14.56327°N 120.99655°E
Calle Vivas	Novales Street	Intramuros	
Calle Washington (Street)	A. Maceda Street	Sampáloc	14.61765°N 120.99492°E
Calle Wright	Antonio Vásquez Street	Malate	14.57295°N 120.98822°E
Calle Zurbarán	Valeriano Fugoso Street	Santa Cruz	14.60765°N 120.98303°E
Calzada de Pásay	Singalong Street	Malate	
Calzada de Singalong	San Andrés Street	Malate-San Andrés	
Carretera de San Pedro Macati	Tejeron Street	Santa Ana	
Columbia Avenue; Calle Rizal; Manila Road; Route 50; Ermita-Pasay Boulevard; Daitoa "Greater East Asia" Avenue	Taft Avenue	Ermita–Malate	14.57476°N 120.98911°E
Dewey Boulevard; Cavite Boulevard; Heiwa "Peace" Boulevard (Dewey Boulevard Airfield); Luneta Road	Roxas Boulevard	Ermita–Malate	14.57093°N 120.98212°E
Governor Forbes Street (Sampaguita Street)	Lacson Avenue	Sampáloc	14.60858°N 120.99396°E
Harrison Boulevard (Koa "Rising Sun" Boulevard)	Quirino Avenue	Malate	14.34127°N 120.59300°E
Joven Boulevard	South Road	Ermita	
Katipunan Street	Magistrado Araullo Street	Santa Mesa	
New Luneta Street or Road (Freedom Road)(Quirino Road)	Parade Avenue	Ermita	
North Bay Boulevard	Honorio López Boulevard	Tondó	
Panaderos Street	Old Panaderos Street	Santa Ana	
Santa Mesa Boulevard	Magsaysay Boulevard	Santa Mesa	14.60240°N 121.01290°E
Santa Mesa Road (Route 53)	Old Santa Mesa Road	Santa Mesa	
Venus Street	Market Road	Santa Ana	

== Quezon City ==
This list is incomplete; you can help by expanding it.

Old name	New name	Crossing to city/municipality
Agham Road/BIR Road	Senator Miriam P. Defensor-Santiago Avenue	Quezon City
Albay Street (San Francisco Del Monte)	Bodino Street	Quezon City
Alcman Street	Lourdes Castillo Street	Quezon City
Alley 19 (Pag-asa)	R.G. Bartolome, Sr. Alley	Quezon City
Arayat Street	P. Bernardo Street	Quezon City
Arizona Street	Monte de Piedad Street	Quezon City
Artillery Avenue (U.P. campus)	Laurel Avenue	Quezon City
Bálic-Bálic Road (Route 53)	N. Domingo Street	Quezon City–San Juan
Banahaw Street	Mayor Ignacio Santos Diaz Street (old name still in use)	Quezon City
Constitutional Road	Batasan–San Mateo Road	Quezon City–San Mateo
Balara Airfield	University Avenue	Quezon City
Bohol Avenue	Sgt. Esguerra Avenue	Quezon City
Bonifacio–Manila Road / Bonifacio-Manila Road / Manila-Novaliches Road / Route 52 / Highway 52	Bonifacio Avenue and Quirino Highway	Quezon City–Norzagaray
Bridgetowne Boulevard	John Gokongwei Jr. Boulevard	Quezon City–Pasig
Brixton Hill Street	Tomas Arguelles Street	Quezon City
Broadway Avenue (Biak-na-Bato)	Doña Juana S. Rodríguez Avenue (name since reverted to Broadway Avenue)	Quezon City
Calle Retiro (Street) / C. Adan Street	N.S. Amoranto Sr. Avenue	Quezon City
Capitol Park Drive	Don Antonio Street	Quezon City
Cebu Avenue	Mother Ignacia Street	Quezon City
Central Avenue	Eraño Manalo Avenue	Quezon City
Central Boulevard	P. Tuazon Boulevard	Quezon City
Constitutional Hill Road (IBP Road)	Batasan Road	Quezon City
Commonwealth Avenue, Quezon City	Don Mariano Marcos Avenue (name since reverted to Commonwealth Avenue)	Quezon City
Don Antonio Street / Interneighborhood Street	Holy Spirit Drive	Quezon City
España Boulevard Extension	E. Rodríguez Sr. Avenue	Quezon City
Fairview Avenue / Quezon Boulevard Extension	Quezon Avenue	Quezon City
Geneta Street	P.G. Santillan Street	Quezon City
Granada Street	Sen. Jose O. Vera Street	Quezon City
Greenhills Drive	Capitol Hills Drive / Manotok Drive	Quezon City
Highland Drive	Tomas Castro Street	Quezon City
Hilaga Avenue	North Avenue	Quezon City
Infantry Avenue (U.P. campus)	Magsaysay Avenue	Quezon City
Ipo Road / Don Tomas Susano Road / Novaliches-Ipo Road (Route 52)	Quirino Highway	Quezon City–Norzagaray
K-A Street	Luis Sianghio Street	Quezon City
K-B Street	Teodoro E. Gener Street	Quezon City
K-C Street	Judge Jimenez Street	Quezon City
K-D Street	Jose E. Erestain Sr. Street	Quezon City
K-E Street	Dr. Jesus Azurin Street	Quezon City
Kanluran Avenue	West Avenue	Quezon City
Kentucky Street	Ernesto Porto Street	Quezon City
La Loma-Balintawak Road	Bonifacio Avenue	Quezon City
Lambay Street	Sta. Catalina Street	Quezon City
Laong Laan Street	Nicanor Roxas Street	Quezon City
La Trinidad Street	Enrique Sobrepeña Street	Quezon City
Litex Road (Manila Gravel Pit Road)	Payatas Road	Quezon City
Louisiana Street	Don Alfredo Egea Street	Quezon City
Maganda Street	Maayusin Street	Quezon City
Main Avenue	Justice Lourdes Paredes San Diego Avenue (old name still in use)	Quezon City
Makiling Street	Don Manuel Agregado	Quezon City
Malasimbo Street (Del Monte Avenue to Maria Clara Street)	Don Ramon Street	Quezon City
Maligaya Street	Mayaman Street	Quezon City
Malualhatì Street	Mahusay/Marilág Streets	Quezon City
Maningning Street	Malusog Street	Quezon City
Mapagsanggalang Street	Mapagkawanggawa Street	Quezon City
Matiisin Street	V. Luna Avenue	Quezon City
Matimyas Street	Mayumì Street	Quezon City
Minnesota Street	Ermin Garcia Avenue	Quezon City
Morong Street	Scout Oscar M. Alcaraz Street	Quezon City
Nevada Street	F. Manalo Street	Quezon City
New York Avenue (west)	Pablo P. Reyes, Sr. Street (old name still in use)	Quezon City
North Avenue (U.P. campus)	Osmeña Avenue	Quezon City
North Diversion Road	North Luzon Expressway	Quezon City–Mabalacat
Pacific Avenue	Doña M. Hemady Street	Quezon City
P. Aunario Street	C. P. Garcia Avenue	Quezon City
P. Pelaez Extension	Pedro Cruz Martinez Street	Quezon City
Pi y Margall Street	Sen. Mariano J. Cuenco Street	Quezon City
Pulog Street	Nicanor Ramirez Street	Quezon City
Renacimiento Street	Tomas Ramirez Street	Quezon City
Roosevelt Avenue	Fernando Poe Jr. Avenue (old name still in use)	Quezon City
Rosario Drive (from Valley Road to N. Domingo Street/Balic-Balic Road) and Valley Road	Betty Go-Belmonte Street	Quezon City
Sampaloc Avenue	Tomas Morato Avenue	Quezon City
Samson Road (Quezon City segment)	Old Samson Road	Quezon City
San Bartolome Street	P. de la Cruz Street	Quezon City
Santolan Road	Col. Bonny Serrano Avenue (old name still in use)	Quezon City-San Juan
Sauyo Road	Don Julio Gregorio Street	Quezon City
Sierra Madre Street	Speaker Perez Street	Quezon City
Silangan Avenue	East Avenue	Quezon City
Silangan Avenue (U.P. campus)	C. P. Garcia Avenue	Quezon City
Sobriedad Street	D. Tuazon Street	Quezon City
South Avenue (U.P. campus)	Roxas Avenue	Quezon City
South 2 Street	Scout Albano Street / Eugenio Lopez Jr. Drive	Quezon City
South 3 Street	Scout Bayoran Street	Quezon City
South 4 Street	Scout Borromeo Street	Quezon City
South 5 Street	Scout Madriñan Street	Quezon City
South 6 Street	Scout Rallos Street	Quezon City
South 7 Street	Scout Limbaga Street	Quezon City
South 8 Street	Scout Fernandez Street	Quezon City
South 9 Street	Scout Fuentebella Street	Quezon City
South 10 Street	Scout Gandia Street	Quezon City
South 11 Street	Scout de Guia Street	Quezon City
South 12 Street	Dr. Lazcano Street	Quezon City
South 13 Street	Scout Delgado Street	Quezon City
South 14 Street	Scout Lozano Street	Quezon City
South 15 Street	Scout Castor Street	Quezon City
South 16 Street	Marathon Street	Quezon City
South 17 Street	Fr. Martinez Street	Quezon City
South 18 Street	Scout Ojeda Street	Quezon City
South 19 Street	Scout Chuatoco Street	Quezon City
South B Street	Scout Magbanua Street	Quezon City
South C Street	Scout Reyes Street	Quezon City
South D Street	Scout Santiago Street	Quezon City
South E Street	Scout Tobias Street	Quezon City
South F Street	Scout Tuason Street	Quezon City
South G Street	Scout Torillo Street	Quezon City
South H Street	Scout Ybardolaza Street	Quezon City
South I Street	11th Jamboree Street / GMA Network Drive	Quezon City
South K Street	Scout Rallos Extension (from north end)	Quezon City
South Market Street	Don Alejandro Roces Avenue	Quezon City
Sunnyside Drive	Eymard Drive	Quezon City
Tacio Street	Comm. Dev. Center Street	Quezon City
Tagaytay Street	Sgt. Rivera Avenue	Quezon City
Tagaytay Street	N. Zamora Street	Quezon City
Timog Avenue	South Avenue (name since reverted to Timog Avenue)	Quezon City
Tuayan Street	Raymundo Familara Street	Quezon City
Virginia Street	Sgt. J. Catolos	Quezon City
Zebra Drive	Temple Drive	Quezon City

== Rest of Metro Manila ==
This list is incomplete; you can help by expanding it.

Old name	New name	City/Municipality
1st Street (Vista Nila Homes)	Diamond Street	Marikina
10th Avenue	Macario Asistio, Sr. Avenue (Name since reverted to 10th Avenue)	Caloocan
2nd Street (Vista Nila Homes)	Emerald Street	Marikina
3rd Street (Vista Nila Homes)	Sapphire Street	Marikina
5th Street (Brgy. Sto. Niño)	Enrique Dela Paz Street (Name since reverted to 5th Street)	Marikina
A. Diego Street	Colonel M. Ver Street	San Juan
Alfaro Street	L.P. Leviste Street	Makati
Alvarado Street	Carlos Palanca Street	Makati
Amber Avenue	J. Escrivà Drive	Pasig
Angel Tuazon Avenue	Mayor Gil Fernando Avenue	Marikina
A. Raquiza Street	F. Antonio Street	San Juan
Alfonso Avenue	Alfonso XIII Street	San Juan
Azucena Street	Tzu-Chi Street (Name since reverted to Azucena Street)	Marikina
Bay Boulevard	Jose W. Diokno Boulevard and Sen. Gil Puyat Avenue Extension	Pasay–Parañaque
Blumentritt Street	Rt. Rev. G. Aglipay Street	Mandaluyong
Buendía Avenue	Sen. Gil Puyat Avenue	Makati–Pasay
C-5 Access Road	Kapitan Enchong Rivera Street (old name still in use)	Marikina
C. Ruiz Street	Pedro B. Mendoza Street	San Juan
C.M. Recto Street (Brgy. Fortune)	Fortune Avenue	Marikina
Calle Baltazar	Zamora Street	Caloocan
Calle Libertad (Street)	Arnaiz Avenue	Pasay
Calle Libertad (Street)	Domingo M. Guevara Street	Mandaluyong
Calle Pinagbarilan	Edang Street	Pasay
Calle Real (Street)	Diego Cera Avenue / Alabang-Zapote Road	Las Piñas–Muntinlupa
Calle Reposo (Street)	Nicanor Garcia Street	Makati
Calle Valenzuela (Street, F. Blumentritt Street to Pinaglabanan Street)	José Gil Street	San Juan
Camino de Mandaluyong (Road), San Juan-Mandaluyong Road	F. Blumentritt Street	San Juan–Mandaluyong
Camino de Mariquina (Road)	San Juan–Marikina Road, Marikina Road, N. Domingo Street	San Juan–Quezon City
Canley Road	Danny Floro Street (old name still in use)	Pasig
Chorillo Street	General Julian Cruz Street (old name still in use)	Marikina
Concepción Street	A. Layug Street	Pasay
Coronado Street	Sgt. F. Santos	Mandaluyong City
Cpl. York Street	Magalona Street	Mandaluyong
Culi-Culi Road	Makati Avenue	Makati
Daang Bakal Road	Munding Avenue, Shoe Avenue, Bagong Silang Road	Marikina
Dalla Street	Andres Soriano Street	San Juan
Dansalan Street	M. Vicente Street	Mandaluyong
Dao Street	Jacobo Z. Zobel Street	Makati
Dela Paz Street	East Drive Street	Marikina
Diamond Avenue	ADB Avenue/F. Abello Street	Pasig
Dinar Street	UBB Bliss (old name still in use)	Marikina
E. Rodriguez Avenue	Eraño G. Manalo Street	Marikina
East Manila South Road (Route 59)	M.L. Quezón	Taguig
Elizalde Road	Elisco Road	Taguig
Emerald Avenue	F. Ortigas, Jr. Road	Pasig
Escarpment Road	Captain Henry P. Javier Street	Pasig
Farmers Avenue	Bagong Farmers Avenue	Marikina
Florante Street	J. Alvior Street	San Juan
Foch Street	Pedro Guevarra Street	San Juan
Foch Street	Lawson Street	Mandaluyong
F.B. Harrison Street	Elpidio Quirino Avenue	Parañaque
Frontera Drive	Central Avenue	Pasig
General Ricarte Street	P. Binay Street	Makati
Gil G. Puyat Street	Don Gonzalo Puyat Street (old name still in use)	Marikina
Guadalupe–Pateros Road (Route 21A)	Dr. José P. Rizal Avenue Extension	Taguig
H. Lozada Street (Aurora Boulevard to 29 de Agosto Street)	Sofronio Veloso Street	San Juan
Herrera Street (L.P. Leviste Street to Amorsolo Street)	Vicente A. Rufino Street	Makati
Hi-Way Drive	Station Road	Makati
Hollywood Drive (Bukang-Liwayway)	Lieutenant José M. Artiaga Street	San Juan
Homeowners Drive	Kapitan Enrico Cruz Street	Marikina
Hotel Drive	East Street	Makati
Ilang-Ilang Street	F. Santos Street	San Juan
Imelda Avenue	Kalayaan Avenue	Makati–Taguig
Imelda Avenue	Ninoy Aquino Avenue	Pasay–Parañaque
J. Reposo Street	Pasong Goma Street	Marikina
Jacamar Street	Mayor Osmundo de Guzman Street (Name since reverted to Jacamar Street)	Marikina
Joffre Street	Ibuna Street	San Juan
Johnston Street	Capt. S. Roja	San Juan
José Gil Street (F. Manalo Street–F. Blumentritt Street)	Valenzuela Street	San Juan
José Rizal Boulevard (Route 54B) / Manila East Road	Shaw Boulevard	Mandaluyong–Pasig
Kabihasnan St.	Victor Medina St.	Parañaque
Kapitan Herminio Siasoco Street	Zapatero Street (Name since reverted to Kapitan Herminio Siasoco Street)	Marikina
Kapitan Temyong Street	Sitio Libis Street (old name still in use)	Marikina
Kenneth Road	Eusebio Avenue (Alfonso Sandoval Avenue to Paraiso Street)	Pasig–Taytay
Kitchener Street (Richenine Street)	C.M. Recto Street	San Juan
Laon Laan Street	P. Antonio Street	Pasig
Las Fiestas Street	Retail Row	Pasig
Las Tiendas Street	Park Drive	Pasig
Lawaan Street	F. Balagtas Street	Marikina
Lion's Road	Dra. Leonisia H. Reyes Street	San Juan
Malibay Street	C. Suarez Street	Pasig
Manila Circumferential Road / Highway 54 (Route 54) / 19 de Junio	Samson Road and Epifanio de los Santos Avenue (EDSA)	Caloocan–Pasay
Manila North Road (Route 3)	MacArthur Highway	Caloocan–Aparri
Highway 55 (Route 55) / Manila Provincial Road	Aurora Boulevard, Legarda Street, Magsaysay Boulevard, and Marikina-Infanta Highway / Marilaque Highway (Marcos Highway)	Manila–Infanta
Marne Street	G. Ocampo Street	San Juan
México Road	Taft Avenue Extension	Pasay
MIA Road	NAIA Road	Parañaque
Melanio Street	Melanio de Salapan Street	San Juan
Molave Street	General Ordoñez Street	Marikina
Nichols–McKinley Road	Andrews Avenue and Lawton Avenue	Pasay–Taguig
Office Drive	North Street	Makati
Oriole Street	Mayor Juan Chanyungco Street	Marikina
Ortega Street (F. Manalo Street–P. Guevarra Street)	Mariano Marcos Street	San Juan
Paraiso Street (Pinaglabanan Street–D. Santiago Street)	Atty. A. Mendoza Street	San Juan
Pasay Road (Route 57)	Arnaiz Avenue	Makati
Pasong Tamo	Chino Roces Avenue	Makati–Taguig
Pershing Street	Romualdez Street	Mandaluyong
Plaridel Street	Eagle Street	Pasig
Plaza de las Flores	Loyola Street	Marikina
Rada Street	Thailand Street (old name still in use)	Makati
Riverside Drive	F. Manalo Street	San Juan
Route 3A	Rizal Avenue Extension	Caloocan
Route 21 B	Dr. Sixto Antonio Avenue	Pasig
Route 53	Sumulong Highway	Marikina
Saint Marcellus Champagnat Street	Champagnat Street	Marikina
San Venancio Street	Adevoso Street	San Juan
South Drive	Palm Drive	Makati
South Superhighway / South Diversion Road	Osmeña Highway, South Luzon Expressway	Manila–Santo Tomas
Súcat Road	Dr. Santos Avenue	Parañaque–Muntinlupa
Sultana Street	La Campana Street (old name still in use)	Makati
Tektite Road	Exchange Road	Pasig
Theater Drive (Ayala Center)	Parksquare Road	Makati
Tramo Street	Aurora Boulevard	Pasay
Ugong Street	Saint Paul Street	Pasig
Verdun Street	Reraon Street	San Juan
West Manila South Road (Route 1A)	Elpidio Quirino Avenue	Parañaque
Yamson Street	Ignacio T. Cruz Street	Marikina

== See also ==
- List of eponymous streets in Metro Manila
- List of roads in Metro Manila
- List of Metro Manila placename etymologies
