= Dekada '70 =

Dekada '70 may refer to:

- Dekada '70 (novel), by Lualhati Bautista
- Dekada '70 (film), a 2002 Filipino drama film, based on the novel
