= Elena Patron =

Filipina writer (1933–2021)

- Born: Elena M. Patron; 18 August 1933
- Died: 14 January 2021 (aged 87)
- Citizenship: Filipino

Elena M. Patron-de los Angeles (18 August 1933 – 14 January 2021), commonly known by her maiden name Elena Patron, was a Filipina scriptwriter, novelist, poet, dramatist, essayist, and magazine columnist. Patron was one of the few women in the Philippines who ventured and succeeded in writing for Philippine comics, a field that was dominated by Filipino male writers.

== Career ==
Patron was a writer for the women’s pages and movies sections of Liwayway magazine. During her tenure as a writer-interviewer of showbusiness personalities, Patron was able to interview American actor Jeffrey Hunter, American singer Paul Anka, and some beauty queens, among others. Her magazine columns included Buhay May-asawa (Married Life), Psychopathic, Munting-lupa (literally Small Portion of Land), and Alta-Sosyedad (High [level of] Society). She became interested in scriptwriting and writing novels for the field of Philippine comics after her Mga Payo ni Ate Mameng (Older Sister Mameng’s Advice) column in the pages of Liwayway magazine was converted into comic book format. Her first comic book novel was Kapatid Ko ang Aking Ina (My Sister is My Mother), a novel that was adapted into a film that gave her a Filipino Academy of Movie Arts and Sciences Award (FAMAS Award) for best story. Among her other novels were Isinilang Ko ang Anak ng Ibang Babae (I Gave Birth to the Child of Another Woman), Dalawa ang Nagdalantao sa Akin (There Were Two Who Became Pregnant for Me), Ako si Emma, Babae (I am Emma, a Woman), Padre, si Eba (Father, This is Eve), Bago N’yo Ako Sumpain (Before You Curse Me), Lord, Give Me a Lover, Ang Mukha ni Aniana (Aniana's Face), Eladia, Sa Lilim ng Ilang-Ilang (Under the Shade of the Ilang-ilang Tree), Cara, Bibo (Dapper), and Sleeping Beauty. Her Sleeping Beauty was a prominent novel in Aliwan Komiks. During the 1990s, upon the decline of Philippine comics readership, Patron moved into writing novels for Tagalog-language paperbacks, locally known as Tagalog pocketbooks.

== Film adaptation ==
Among Patron’s novels that had been adapted into films included Lord, Give Me a Lover, Adult Kid, Ako si Emma, Babae (I am Emma, a Woman), Isinilang Ko ang Anak ng Ibang Babae (I Gave Birth to the Child of Another Woman), Pompa, Dalawa ang Nagdalantao sa Akin (There Were Two Who Became Pregnant for Me), Padre, si Eba (Father, This is Eve), Bago N’yo Ako Sumpain (Before You Curse Me), Ligaw-Tingin, Halik-Hangin (Courtship Through Gazing, Kissing in the Wind [undemonstrated desire to court and kiss a person admired; the suitor can only look at the admired woman, unable to get closer, a kisser of empty space]), and Kape’t Gatas (literally Coffee and Milk; figuratively Brown and White [referring to skin color]).

== Personal life and death ==
Patron was married to insurance consultant Angel T. de los Angeles, whom she wed until his death on January 14, 2004. She is the mother of one offspring, Angelo Ardee.

Patron died on 14 January 2021, at the age of 84. Her remains were cremated three days later, on 17 January, at the Loyola Crematorium Sucat in Parañaque.

== Awards ==
Apart from her FAMAS-award-winning novel Kapatid Ko ang Aking Ina, Patron obtained awards from The Citizen’s Council for Mass Media (CCMM), Starlight Cultural Foundation, Komiks Operation Brotherhood, Inc. (KOMOPEB), and the Catholic Mass Media.

== See also ==
- Lualhati Bautista
