= Ang Mestisa =

1920 novel by Engracio L. Valmonte

Ang Mestisa Unang Bahagi
- Author: Engracio L. Valmonte
- Language: Tagalog
- Genre: Novel
- Publisher: Imprenta Ilagan y Compañía
- Publication date: 1920
- Publication place: Philippines
- Media type: Print

Ang Mestisa Ikalawang Bahagi
- Author: Engracio L. Valmonte
- Language: Tagalog
- Genre: Novel
- Publisher: Imprenta Ilagan y Compañía
- Publication date: 1920
- Publication place: Philippines
- Media type: Print

This is about the novel by Engracio Valmonte. For the painting by Juan Luna, see Una Mestiza.

Ang Mestisa (The Mestiza) is a well-known Tagalog-language novel written by Filipino novelist Engracio L. Valmonte in 1920. Published in two parts, the novel was divided into two books entitled Ang Mestisa Unang Bahagi (The Mestiza Part One) and Ang Mestisa Ikalawang Bahagi (The Mestiza Part Two). The novel was published in Manila, Philippines by the Imprenta Ilagan y Compañia in 1921. It was printed by the Imprenta Nacional during the American period in Philippine history. Later on, the novel was adapted as a zarzuela.

== Description ==
The setting of the novel was the way of life in the high-levels of Philippine society. The main characters of the story are Elsa (the mestiza), Tirso Silveira (a poet and lawyer), and Teang (the female college student). The main focus of the novel is Elsa, who being a mestiza of Spanish descent, was the representation of arrogance, selfishness, and contemptuousness of the Filipino lower-class. Elsa fell in love with Tirso Silveira but Silveira fell in love with Teang, the representation of coyness or diffidence, kindness, and warmth. Elsa and Teang are opposites of one another. The love triangle, despite Elsa's plans to win Silveira’s heart, resulted in the union of Silveira and Teang. Elsa, as a consequence of her failure, succumbs to insanity.

== See also ==
- Busabos ng Palad
