= Almario =

Almario is a surname. Notable people with the surname include:

- Alfie Almario (1963–2001), Filipino basketball player
- Cheeno Almario (born 1993), Filipino politician
- Justo Almario (born 1949), Colombian musician
- Mario Almario (born 1934), Filipino sailor
- Rosauro Almario, Filipino writer
- Virgilio S. Almario, Filipino artist
