= 'GAPÔ =

1988 novel by Lualhati Bautista

- Book cover for Lualhati Bautista's 'GAPÔ.
- Author: Lualhati Bautista
- Language: Filipino
- Genre: Fiction
- Published: 1988 (Carmelo & Bauermann)
- Publication place: Philippines
- Pages: 152
- ISBN: 9-711-79025-4
- OCLC: 21339374
- LC Class: PL6058.9.B39 G3 1988

'GAPÔ is a 1988 Tagalog novel written by award-winning Filipino author Lualhati Bautista. Its complete title is 'GAPÔ at isang puting Pilipino, sa mundo ng mga Amerikanong kulay brown which means "'Gapô and one white Filipino, in a world of brown Americans" in translation. 'Gapô is an abbreviated form of the Philippine place name Olongapo.

The novel is about the oppression of the Americans on Filipinos, and the pressure that the Americans gave to them.

== Plot summary ==
The novel begins with introducing the way of life of Filipinos Mike, Magda, Modesto, and Ali in the bar Freedom Pad. Mike performs songs for the Filipino and American customers of Freedom Pad. Magdalena works as a hostess to search for an American lover to marry. Modesto, who visits his friend Mike at Freedom Pad, works at Subic Naval Base, where an American Navy official Johnson frequently insults him. Despite this, Modesto has a friend William Smith with whom he can talk. Ali, who frequents Freedom Pad, takes care of his nephew Jeffrey every day in a posh bungalow in the white community of Olongapo with his Filipino assistant Igna.

One day, Jun mentions that he is interested in getting a job at the naval base in Olongapo. Modesto disagrees, for the reason that Modesto's father also works there. An American ship military arrives, and Ali meets an American, Richard Halloway, who becomes his boyfriend. Magdalena also fell in love with an American soldier, Steve Taylor, whom Magda considered kind and gentlemanly, unlike her former companions. Eventually, the two pairs of lovers become closer. Additionally, Mike and Steve Taylor become friends, which becomes an exception to Mike's hatred of Americans. Magdalena and Ali no longer go to Freedom Pad, either. Besides Mike and Steve Taylor, Ignacio and Richard Halloway also became close friends.

Jun gets a job at a military base, which angers his father now that he is aware of Johnson harassing Modesto in the base. The next day, William Smith tries to talk to Modesto, but Modesto does not treat Smith well. At the work site, a nuclear ship, Modesto runs out of patience as Johnson repeatedly yells at him. He insults Johnson and Johnson punches him in response, resulting in a brawl on the ship. Filipino workers and William Smith try to stop the two, but were eventually killed by an American, who may have been Johnson himself or his companion, Modesto.

After Modesto's funeral, Richard and Ignacio steal Ali's vault and beat him afterwards. Just a few days after the Ali incident, Mike Taylor spoke to Steve on the Freedom Pad. Here, Steve Taylor admits that he is going home to his wife and child in America, and that he will leave Magdalena pregnant. As he admits this, Mike suddenly remembered the oppression of his fellow Filipinos by the Americans: the murder of Modesto, the robbery of Ali, and the abandonment of Dolores and her son. In a fit of rage, he hits Steve with the guitar, who also dies at that time.

In the final chapter of the novel, Magdalena visits Mike, who is in prison for homicide. Magda visits Mike and tells her to take care of Jeffrey and Ali. During their conversation, Magdalena says that she understands Mike's anger and says that she feels the same. Mike replies that he just vented his anger when he killed Steve Taylor. The novel ends with Magdalena, while crying and holding Mike's hand, declares her son's name to be Michael Taylor III.

== Characters ==
- Michael Taylor Jr. – A 20-year-old Filipino GI Baby who is a folk singer in Freedom Pad.
- Michael Taylor Sr. – The American father of Michael Taylor Jr. He is a soldier who
- Dolores – The Filipino mother of Michael Taylor Jr.
- Magdalena – A Filipino hostess who works as a prostitute in Freedom Pad for her livelihood and an opportunity to migrate to the US.
- Steve – The American suitor of Magdalena, who is described as a nice person. However, he impregnates Magdalena and abandons her.
- Alipio "Ali" – A gay Filipino working at Freedom Pad to search for a parental figure for his nephew Jeffrey. He forms a relationship with Modesto, then with Richard Halloway.
- Igna – A Filipino housekeeper and assistant of Ali
- Richard Halloway – The suitor of Alipio, described as a kind person but always keeps track of Alipio's activity. However, Richard and Igna stole Ali's money and beats him.
- Modesto – A Filipino worker in Subic Naval Base and father of Jun. Despite facing harassment in the workplace by Americans, he still works in the base for the high salary offered.
- Jun – The eldest son of Modesto.
- William Smith – The American close friend of Modesto. He is noted in the novel as a kind person.
- Irene – The Filipino spouse of William Smith. She was a hostess who met William
- Jeffrey – A seven-year-old Filipino raised in the United States but resides in the Philippines.
- Johnson – An American Navy official who frequently insults Modesto in the naval base.

== See also ==
- Pinaglahuan
- Satanas sa Lupa
