= Nang Si Eba ay Likhain =

Nang Si Eba ay Likhain (When Eve was Created) is a Tagalog-language fictional romantic novel written by Filipino novelist Rosauro Almario in 1913.

== See also ==
- Satanas sa Lupa
