= Sa Ngalan ng Diyos =

1911 Tagalog novel by Faustino Aguilar

- Author: Faustino Aguilar
- Language: Tagalog
- Genre: Novel
- Publisher: Limbagan at Aklatan Ni I.R. Morales
- Publication date: 1911
- Publication place: Philippines
- Media type: Print
- Pages: 191
- ISBN: 978-971-0538-62-1
- Followed by: Ang Lihim ng Isang Pulo

Sa Ngalan ng Diyos ("In the Name of God") is a Tagalog-language novel written in 1911 by Filipino author Faustino Aguilar. Controversially, it illustrated how greedy Jesuit priests schemed, manipulated, and took advantage of Carmen, a young, naive, pious, and affluent heiress. The 191-page book was published in Manila by the Limbagan at Aklatan Ni I.R. Morales (Printing Press and Library of I.R. Morales) during the American period in Philippine history (1898–1946).

== Plot ==
In the narrative, Jesuit priests used their religious authority and influence on Carmen to gain access to her wealth. Included in these plans and machinations was the destruction of the ongoing relationship between Carmen and Mr. Roland. Mr. Roland is Carmen's boyfriend. The priests succeeded. Carmen breaks up with Mr. Roland to enter the convent run by the Jesuit order. Thus, Carmen's inheritance became property of the priests. There was a scene when Eladio Resurreccion, a former cohort of the Jesuit priests, tried to set the convent on fire. However, Resurreccion's act of vengeance did not succeed. Only a stable for horses was ruined by the fire.

== Analysis ==
According to literary critic Soledad Reyes, Sa Ngalan ng Diyos is a "passionate polemic" against Jesuit priests, an influential religious order representing the Roman Catholic Church, a powerful and authoritative institution in the Philippines. Reyes further explained that Aguilar's Sa Ngalan ng Diyos is unlike the "polemical writing" or "literature of caricatures and parodies" during the 19th century because the novel scrutinized the Jesuits, not the Dominicans, Franciscans, and Augustinians who are categorically known as "friars who owned vast wealth and property" during the period. Aguilar, through the novel, showed his anti-clerical view and his being against the religious order of the Jesuits because of the maltreatment and humiliation his father received from Nicolas Dolanto, a Jesuit priest. Furthermore, Aguilar's father was accused by Dolanto as being a "Mason". Aguilar's novel scrutinized the "insidious hold" that religion, in general, may have over people, in this case the Catholic Church over Carmen, the heiress. Aguilar tackled the "aspects of religious faith" that can damage the "state of mind of people". The 2005 edition of Aguilar's novel that was published by the Ateneo de Manila University Press (ADMU Press) has an introduction by literary critic Roberto Añonuevo. In the introduction, Añonuevo discussed an additional topic that Aguilar tackled in Sa Ngalan ng Diyos, namely the Katipunan of Philippine heroes Andres Bonifacio and Emilio Jacinto.
