= Busabos ng Palad =

Book by Faustino Aguilar

- Author: Faustino Aguilar
- Language: Tagalog
- Genre: Novel
- Publisher: Manila Filatelica
- Publication date: 1909
- Publication place: Philippines
- Media type: Print

Busabos ng Palad (Pauper of Fate or The Wretched) is a Tagalog-language novel written by Filipino novelist Faustino Aguilar in 1909. Apart from tackling the "ills and injustices" in Philippine society, Busabos ng Palad revolves around love, romance, tragedy, and prostitution. The 157-page novel was published in Manila by Manila Filatelica.

== Setting ==
The novel was written by Aguilar during a time in the American occupation of the Philippines (1898–1946) when the "cabarets and dancing halls", and similar establishments became common in Manila. These businesses became institutions that catered to men and their pleasure.

== Plot ==
The plot of the novel narrates the love story of the protagonists Celso and Rita. Celso left Rita and their province to study in Manila. Rita disappeared from her province. In the meantime, Celso became a writer and coincidentally saves a prostitute from her fate by paying off her debt. The prostitute was Rita, his girlfriend. For two years, Rita became a victim of prostitution. Despite Rita's fate and reputation, Celso remained Rita's lover. Celso and Rita decided to live together. Rita became ill. After Rita's death, Celso became insane and was committed to an asylum.

== Influence ==
In writing the novel, Aguilar was influenced by Camille, also known as The Lady of the Camellias, the 1848 French-language novel written by Alexandre Dumas about a "prostitute with [a] golden heart". According to literary critic Soledad Reyes, Busabos ng Palad is one among several Tagalog-language novels that defended, with "compassion and sympathy", women who fell victim to white slavery. Busabos ng Palad is also one of the Filipino novels that condemned the institutions that created this type of "fallen women". Other Filipino writers who ventured into this theme include Iñigo Ed. Regalado, Juan Arsciwals, Ruperto Cristobal, and Antonio Sempio.

== See also ==
- Pinaglahuan
- Ang Mestisa
