= Ang mga Anak Dalita =

1911 book by Patricio Mariano

- Original cover
- Author: Patricio Mariano
- Language: Tagalog
- Genre: Novel
- Publisher: Limbagan at Aklatan Ni I.R. Morales
- Publication date: 1911
- Publication place: Philippines
- Media type: Print
- Pages: 73
- Preceded by: Juan Masili: Ang Pinuno ng Tulisan
- Followed by: Ang Tala sa Panghulo

Ang mga Anak Dalita ("[The] Children of the Poor") is a 1911 Tagalog-language novel written by Filipino novelist Patricio Mariano. The 73-page novel was published in Manila by Limbagan at Aklatan Ni I.R. Morales (Printing Press And Library of I.R. Morales) during the American era in Philippine history (1898–1946). Ang mga Anak Dalita is a political novel that deals also with Filipino ideology, the socio-economic situation, the industrial upheaval, and the struggle of the oppressed Filipino working class in Manila during Mariano’s time.

== Description ==
Contemporary cover

Mariano wrote Ang mga Anak Dalita in poetic form. The theme of the novel is about how the poor in the Philippines become poorer by being exploited by capitalists. According to literary critic Soledad Reyes, there was a scene in the novel wherein Ata, the main female protagonist, narrates a story about how the Philippines (represented by the name "Mutya", meaning "pearl", "precious stone", or "charmstone") became the victim of Spain (represented by the name "Dulong", a type of small fish known as the Gobiopterus lacustris (lacustrine goby), which belongs to the family Gobiidae), and the United States (represented by the name "Limatik", meaning "leech"). Based on Philippine history, the Philippines was colonized by Spain from 1521 to 1898, and then by the United States from 1898 to 1946.

== Plot ==
The characters of the novel include Ata, Teta, Pedro, and a factory owner. Ata is a poor woman. Teta is Ata’s daughter. Pedro is Ata’s lover. The factory owner in the novel is the “avaricious” and “lustful" boss of Ata. The factory owner tried to rape Ata, but she was able to escape. During a conflict with the laborers, Ata’s daughter Teta saves the factory owner from being killed by the factory workers. In the end, Teta turns out to be the daughter of the factory owner. The theme of the novel is similar to Mariano’s other novel Ang Tala sa Panghulo ("The Bright Star at Panghulo").
