= In the Claws of Brightness =

1986 novel by Edgardo M. Reyes

- 1986 cover art for Edgardo M. Reyes's Sa mga Kuko ng Liwanag
- Author: Edgardo M. Reyes
- Original title: Sa mga Kuko ng Liwanag
- Language: Tagalog
- Genre: Fiction
- Publisher: Liwayway Publishing, Inc., De La Salle University Press
- Publication date: November 13, 1967–January 15, 1968 (serialized)
- Publication place: Philippines
- Pages: 147

The Japanese book cover for Edgardo M. Reyes's Sa mga Kuko ng Liwanag.

In the Claws of Brightness (Filipino: Sa mga Kuko ng Liwanag), is a 1968 Tagalog language novel written by Filipino author Edgardo M. Reyes, originally serialized in the weekly Liwayway magazine from 1967 to 1968. The title In the Claws of Brightness is a literal word-for-word translation of the Tagalog title, which as a phrase effectively makes little sense in English. A more practical English translation would be At the Verge of Dawn. The story became the basis for the award-winning Filipino film, Manila in the Claws of Light.

== Summary ==
Julio, a poor fisherman, goes to Manila to search for his betrothed named Ligaya. Sometime before Julio's trip, Ligaya had left with a lady named Mrs. Cruz in order to study and work in the city. Now in Manila, Julio becomes a victim to some of the city's scums. Julio experiences abuses while working in a construction site. He eventually loses his job and desperately looks for a decent place where he can sleep. Slowly, Julio develops a cynical demeanor as he gradually loses hope of ever finding Ligaya.

All this is put on hold, however, when Julio finally reunites Ligaya, and learns from her that she is a victim of sex trafficking. Julio and Ligaya plan to escape.

== Film adaptation ==
The 1975 adaptation of the novel entitled Manila in the Claws of Light was directed by award-winning director Lino Brocka. The script was written by Clodualdo del Mundo, Jr. Jose Capino, writing for Criterion, noted that the film was met with "charges of anti-Chinese racism from reviewers."

== Translation ==
The book had been translated into Japanese by Motoe Terami-Wada. The novel, retitled as Manila: Hikaru Tsume (マニラ : 光る爪) had become a bestselling book in Japan.

== See also ==
- Satanas sa Lupa
