= Charing (disambiguation) =

Charing is a village in Kent, England

Charing can also refer to:

- Charing, Georgia, a community in the United States
- Charing, Tibet, a village in Tibet
- Charing (painting), also known as Una Mestiza
- Charing, London, former village now known as Charing Cross
