= Pinaglahuan =

1907 novel by Faustino Aguilar

- Author: Faustino Aguilar
- Language: Tagalog
- Genre: Novel
- Publisher: Manila Filateco
- Publication date: 1907
- Publication place: Philippines
- Media type: Print

Pinaglahuan (literally "the point or place where someone or something disappeared" or "fading point") is a Tagalog-language novel written by Filipino novelist Faustino S. Aguilar. Aguilar completed the manuscript on September 25, 1906. The novel was published by Manila Filateco in Manila, Philippines in 1907. The novel was written during the American period in Philippine history (1898-1946).

== Description ==
According to Soledad Reyes, Faustino's Pinaglahuan was a pioneer novel in Philippine literature that tackled social realism in the Philippines, meaning it was one of the first books to focus on the realistic state of Philippine society. Faustino wrote the novel after being influenced by the socialist teaching of 19th century European thinkers. Pinaglahuan was Faustino's response against imperialism and colonialism.

== Characters ==
Among the characters of the novel were Luis Gatbuhay, Don Nicanor, Danding, and Rojalde. Luis Gatbuhay was a labor leader. Danding is Gatbuhay's girlfriend and daughter of Don Nicanor. Rojalde was a wealthy mestizo to whom Don Nicanor wanted to betroth Danding, instead of Gatbuhay. Gatbuhay was the representation of the masses or the common Filipino people.

== Plot ==
Set during the early 20th century in the Philippines, Pinaglahuan narrates the story of the life of Luis Gatbuhay, the labor leader whose life was ruined by the mestizo class, represented by Rojalde. The first scene in Pinaglahuan depicted a meeting inside the Teatro Zorilla (Zorilla Theatre). The purpose of the gathering was about the call to free the Philippines from the American occupiers. Another scene depicted the confrontation between Gatbuhay and Don Nicanor while inside a carriage. Don Nicanor wanted to marry off Danding to Rojalde because the purpose of paying off his gambling debt. Luis lost his job because of Rojalde's power and influence. In addition, Rojalde implicated Gatbuhay to a crime and was imprisoned for four years. Rojalde and Danding became husband and wife, but Danding gave birth to Gatbuhay's child. At the ending scene of the novel, Gatbuhay was killed by a bomb explosion inside the prison.

== See also ==
- 'GAPÔ
- Satanas sa Lupa
