= Manuel Buising =

Filipino playwright (1951–2020)

- Born: May 4, 1951; Manila, Philippines
- Died: May 18, 2020 (aged 69)
- Occupation: Screenwriter

Manuel "Manny" Buising (May 4, 1951 - May 18, 2020) was a playwright, fictionist and komiks writer. He studied at the Pamantasan ng Lungsod ng Maynila and graduated with a degree in Bachelor of Science in Education, Major in Filipino in 1972.

He was the official screenplay writer of Fernando Poe Jr. from 1990 until the actor died in 2005. In the same year, his work, "Niños Inocentes," which exposes how minors are used by pedophiles through cybersex or sex videos, often with the knowledge and consent of their own parents, won the teleplay category in Carlos Palanca Awards. He is no stranger to the Palanca awards, in fact, he was won numerous first place awards in various fields ranging from dramatic plays to short stories and even television plays. His previous accomplishments include first place in the 1988 for his short play "Tumbampreso" and another for his play "Kung Bakit may Nuno sa Punso" in the same year. In 1990, he won first prize for both his plays; "Patay-Bata" and "Lista sa Tubig". His other first prize winner is "P’wera Usog" during the 1989 awards. In all of his great works, he considered "Kung Bakit May Nuno sa Punso," which tackled the presence of American military bases in the country, his best work yet.

He also worked in the government specifically as a writer in the Department of Local and Government Community Development. He was also staff director of the National Secretariat of the Bagong Kilusang Kabuhayan at Kaunlaran.

Some of his works have appeared in Liwayway and Pilipino Reporter.

== See also ==
- Lualhati Bautista
- Edgardo M. Reyes
- Paz Márquez-Benítez
