= Manila in the Claws of Light =

1975 neo noir drama film by Lino Brocka

Maynila sa mga Kuko ng Liwanag
- Theatrical release poster
- Directed by: Lino Brocka
- Screenplay by: Clodualdo del Mundo Jr.
- Based on: In the Claws of Brightness by Edgardo M. Reyes
- Produced by: Miguel de Leon; Severino Manotok
- Starring: Rafael Roco Jr.; Hilda Koronel
- Cinematography: Miguel de Leon
- Edited by: Edgardo Jarlego; Ike Jarlego Jr.
- Music by: Max Jocson
- Production company: Cinema Artists Philippines
- Distributed by: Mever Films
- Release dates: July 16, 1975; August 7, 2013 (re-release)
- Running time: 125 minutes
- Country: Philippines
- Language: Filipino

Manila in the Claws of Light (Filipino: Maynila, sa mga Kuko ng Liwanag) is a 1975 Philippine neo noir drama film directed by Lino Brocka from a screenplay written by Clodualdo del Mundo Jr., based on the novel In the Claws of Brightness by Edgardo M. Reyes. The film stars Hilda Koronel, Lou Salvador, Jr., Tommy Abuel, and in his film debut, Rafael Roco, Jr. The film features cinematography by Mike de Leon and editing by brothers Edgardo and Ike Jarlego. It tells the story of Júlio Madiaga, a young man from the province of Marinduque who arrives in Manila for a mission to find his lover Ligaya. While making plans for his mission, he has to survive the conditions in the capital city, contending with issues like crime and prostitution.

It is one of the many films in the Philippines released during the Marcos era which lasted until the 1986 revolution, and in retrospect, one of the few films to gain international critical recognition. It is widely considered the greatest Philippine film of all time by voters, especially the local and international filmmakers and critics.

== Plot ==
Julio Madiaga is a young man from the island of Marinduque who arrives in Manila in 1970. From time to time, he passes by the corner of Ongpin and Misericordia, staring at a peculiar building from a distance. While pursuing his quest, he has to work to survive urban life. At first, Julio works in construction and at the site, he befriends coworker Atong, who was hired some five weeks before. Another coworker advises Julio that city life is quite difficult without the income to enjoy urban comforts. Julio begins to slowly observe the harsh reality of society, culminating in the accidental death of a worker.

One day, Julio and Atong shop for clothes at a marketplace when a woman dressed in black and wearing sunglasses catches Julio's attention. She reminds him of Mrs. Cruz, the woman who brought his girlfriend Ligaya to Manila for schooling. Julio runs through the crowd to follow the woman and tries to approach her, but before he can say anything, the lady shrieks in distress. Julio flees to not make a scene, running back to Atong and leaving the marketplace with him. This is followed by other occasions of spotting Mrs. Cruz, leading Julio to discover that Ligaya was brought to Manila for prostitution. He continues encountering people in Manila including callboys (male prostitutes) and the relatives of coworkers, eventually reuniting with former workmate Pol, who supported him earlier and was a good friend.

Julio eventually locates Ligaya, and she explains everything that has happened to her since leaving home. Julio plans with Ligaya to return to Marinduque with her four-month old baby. They agree to meet at Arranque Market, but she fails to appear at the appointed time.

Despondent, Julio returns to Pol's home, where he's been staying. Pol informs him the next day that Ligaya died that night - she allegedly fell down a flight of stairs, but her bruising suggests she was killed by Ah-Tek, the man who rented her from Mrs. Cruz and kept her and their baby imprisoned. Enraged, Julio stalks Ah-Tek, whom he saw at Ligaya's funeral. The following night, Julio goes to Ah-Tek's house and kills him. Afterward, a mob pursues, corners and strikes the fearful Julio. A heavenly silhouette of Ligaya is shown as the film fades to white, then sky blue.

== Characters ==
- Rafael Roco, Jr. as Julio Madiaga - The 21-year-old protagonist who hails from Marinduque, wandering Manila in search of his lover, Ligaya. He starts the narrative as a patient, if naive, character; only to gradually transform into a weary and vengeful person.
- Hilda Koronel as Ligaya Paraiso - The betrothed of Julio. She was brought away to Manila with the thought of getting proper education, only to wind up getting entrapped in sexual slavery. Her name literally translates to "joyful paradise".
- Lou Salvador, Jr. as Atong - A construction worker Julio befriends. Atong serves as Julio's guide to the plight of the working class; and in effect Manila, helping him cope with the unpleasantness of the city. He later gets wrongfully arrested and meets his demise at the hands of fellow inmates.
- Tommy Abuel as Pol - A friend of Julio who also acts as his confidant. He serves as Julio's guide to the impoverished districts of Manila. Steadfast and loyal, Pol also offers his help and gives advice to Julio whenever needed.
- Jojo Abella as Bobby - A call boy Julio befriends. He serves as Julio's guide to the world of male prostitution. An attraction towards Julio is implied.
- Pio de Castro as Imo - A colleague of Julio from the construction site. He was initially poor at the start of the narrative, but has later improved his lifestyle.
- Joonee Gamboa as Omeng - Another colleague of Julio from the construction site.
- Pancho Pelagio as Mr. Balajadia - One of the antagonists of the story. He is the foreman of the construction site Julio worked in. Arrogant and selfish, he often treated his subordinates unfairly.
- Juling Bagabaldo as Mrs. Cruz - One of the antagonists of the story. An unsavory character who recruits unsuspecting, young provincial women to her prostitution ring. It was speculated by Julio that "Mrs. Cruz" may not even be her real name, but rather an alias.
- Tommy Yap as Ah-Tek - One of the antagonists of the story. He is an unscrupulous mestizo de sangley who bought Ligaya from Mrs. Cruz's prostitution ring and made her his kept woman.

== Production ==
The film is based on a story, Sa mga Kuko ng Liwanag (lit. "In the Claws of Brightness'"), written by Edgardo Reyes. It was originally serialized in Liwayway magazine from 1967 to 1968, and was later published into a novel.

The adaptation into film originally started out life as a writing exercise. In 1970, Ateneo de Manila graduate Clodualdo del Mundo, Jr. re-enrolled in his alma mater to take a short course in film writing. There, he wrote Pepot Artista (a screenplay he would later revisit in the 2000s). Del Mundo finished his script for Pepot Artista, which was supposed to be a major assignment, by the middle of the semester; earlier than what was expected. His professor, Nestor Torre, requested him to make another screenplay as way of filling in the extra time. Because he had just written an original screenplay, Del Mundo tried his hand at adapting a literary source for a change. He chose Reyes' story, already a novel by then, as the subject for his next assignment. After turning in the spec script, Del Mundo completed his course and relocated to the United States to continue his studies at the University of Kansas in Lawrence, Kansas.

Mike De Leon, grandson to Narcisa de Leon of LVN Pictures, had directed one short film and intended to expand his role in the film industry, namely as a producer. De Leon had just put up a new production company, Cinema Artists, and was in the process of seeking out projects. Eventually, De Leon remembered of Del Mundo's trial adaptation. Having been friends since their days at Ateneo de Manila, De Leon contacted Del Mundo with the idea of producing the latter's spec script. Del Mundo, who just returned from his four-year course in Kansas, gave De Leon his blessing and agreed to further polish the screenplay. "It was the right time," Del Mundo recalls.

Lino Brocka, who had just received acclaim for his previous work, Tinimbang Ka Ngunit Kulang, was approached by De Leon to direct the adaptation. Brocka took this as an opportunity to create a commentary about urban poverty amidst the Marcos dictatorship and included homosexual themes not present in the original source. "Brocka understood the popular audience well," Del Mundo says. "He suggested additions to the screenplay [of The Claws of Light] to make it more commercial. It was fun working with him, although he was quite emotional."

The production title was eventually changed from Sa mga Kuko ng Liwanag to Maynila, sa mga Kuko ng Liwanag (lit. translation: Manila in the Claws of Light) to emphasize the setting of the story.

An independent production, The Claws of Light was produced with a modest budget for Cinema Artists. Principal photography occurred in 1974. The film was shot on actual locations around the vicinity of Manila, to better capture the authenticity of the city.

Jay Ilagan, who had previously acted in Brocka's films, initially played the lead role of Julio Madiaga. Having already participated in several days of shooting, Ilagan was asked to drop out of the production when Brocka became dissatisfied with the performance. Upon viewing the dailies, Brocka was convinced that Ilagan, who had a very healthy appearance, did not meet his vision of Julio—a pitiful vagrant that wades in and around the urban gutters. The role was re-cast with newcomer Bembol Roco in the part. Prior to this film, Roco's only foray in to acting was a relatively small role in Brocka's previous film, Three, Two, One. For this film, he was credited under his real name of Rafael Roco, Jr. The Claws of Light marked what would become the first lead role for Roco.

To play Ligaya Paraiso, Brocka chose Hilda Koronel. Lou Salvador, Jr., a former matinee idol famous for playing angst-ridden romantic leads in LVN's teen rebel pictures, was cast against type as the wise and sympathetic Atong. Character actor Tommy Yap was cast as the rarely-seen antagonist, Ah-Tek. Yap would later appear—albeit less significantly—in Brocka's Insiang, alongside Koronel. The majority of the actors that round out the film, such as Tommy Abuel and Joonee Gamboa, were veterans of both the stage and radio.

== Reception ==
=== Critical reception ===
Rotten Tomatoes, a review aggregator, reports that 100% of five surveyed critics gave the film a positive review; the average rating is 8.4/10. Manohla Dargis of The New York Times made it a "NYT Critics' Pick" and wrote, "The movie's palpable, deeply lived-in realism is among its great attractions, largely because the film isn't just a story about a young Filipino Everyman, but because it's also a de facto record of Manila in the 1970s." Inkoo Kang of The Village Voice wrote, "The intimate proletarian melodrama The Claws of Light succeeds where so many political allegories fail: With ethical and emotional sophistication, it dramatizes the suffering of the disadvantaged with characters that feel individual yet archetypal." Meanwhile, Jose Capino, writing for The Criterion Collection, noted that the film was met with "charges of anti-Chinese racism from reviewers". Keith Uhlich of Time Out New York rated it 4/5 stars and wrote that it is "widely (and understandably) considered one of the pinnacles of Filipino cinema". Alan Jones of Slant Magazine rated it 4.5/5 stars and called the film a precursor to A Touch of Sin.

In a retrospective essay reflecting on the film's enduring relevance nearly 50 years after its 1975 release, Paul Emmanuel Enicola of The Movie Buff described Manila in the Claws of Light as "a searing indictment. Every institution, from labor to media to law enforcement, fails the characters. Their story isn’t rare. It’s ordinary. And that’s what makes it devastating."

=== Accolades ===
Award-giving organization	Date of ceremony	Category	Recipient(s)	Result	Ref.
24th FAMAS Awards	1976	Best Picture	Manila in the Claws of Light	Won	
24th FAMAS Awards	1976	Best Director	Lino Brocka	Won	
24th FAMAS Awards	1976	Best Actor	Rafael Roco Jr.	Won	
24th FAMAS Awards	1976	Best Actress	Hilda Koronel	Nominated	
24th FAMAS Awards	1976	Best Supporting Actor	Tommy Abuel	Won	
24th FAMAS Awards	1976	Best Supporting Actress	Lily Gamboa-Mendoza	Nominated	
24th FAMAS Awards	1976	Best Screenplay	Manila in the Claws of Light; Screenplay by Clodualdo Del Mundo Jr.	Won	
24th FAMAS Awards	1976	Best Story	Manila in the Claws of Light; Story by Edgardo M. Reyes	Won	
24th FAMAS Awards	1976	Best Sound Direction	Ramon Reyes	Won	
24th FAMAS Awards	1976	Best Cinematography	Mike de Leon	Won	
24th FAMAS Awards	1976	Best Editing	Ike Jarlego Jr.	Won	

=== Recognition ===
Maynila is one of the few Filipino films that has been consistently placed among the world's top 100 films of all time. It is the only film from the Philippines that is included in the list of the book, 1001 Movies You Must See Before You Die.

It was shown as part of the Cannes Classics section of the 2013 Cannes Film Festival.

== Stage adaptation ==
A stage adaptation of the film was released in 2017, directed by Joel Lamangan. It was presented by Grand Leisure Corporation and features music by Von de Guzman, choreography by Douglas Nierras, and production design by Jun Flavier Pablo. The musical starred Arman Ferrer as Julio Madiaga; Shiela Valderrama-Martinez as Ligaya Paraiso (with Lara Maigue as alternate); Floyd Tena as Pol; Noel Rayos as Atong; Aicelle Santons as Perla (with Rita Daniela as alternate); Dulce as Mrs. Cruz (with Ima Castro as alternate).

== Restoration ==
Manila in the Claws of Light was restored in 4K resolution in 2013. The restoration was performed by World Cinema Foundation and the Film Development Council of the Philippines at Cineteca di Bologna/ L'Immagine Ritrovata laboratory, in association with LVN, Cinema Artists Philippines and Mike de Leon. The restored film premiered at the 2013 Cannes Film Festival as part of the Cinema Classics section and was released in the Philippines on August 7, 2013. The restored film was released on DVD and Blu-Ray as part of The Criterion Collection on June 12, 2018.

== See also ==
- Insiang
- Cinema of the Philippines
