= Tagalog pocketbooks =

Romance novels in the Tagalog language

Tagalog romance novels, sometimes collectively referred to as Tagalog pocketbooks, Tagalog paperbacks, Tagalog romance paperbacks, Tagalog romance pocketbooks, Philippine romance novels, Filipino romance novels, Pinoy pocketbooks, Tagalog popular novels, or Tagalog popular romance literature are commercialized novels published in paperback or pocketbook format published in the Tagalog or the Filipino language in the Philippines. Unlike the formal or literary romance genre, these popular romance novels were written, as described by Dominador Buhain in the book A History of Publishing in the Philippines as a form of traditional or conventional romance stories of "rich boy meets poor girl or vice versa who go through a series of obstacles and finally end up in each other's arms".

== Description ==
According to Tatin Yang in the article Romansang Pinoy: A day with Tagalog romance novels, Tagalog romance paperbacks were thin Philippine versions of romance novel books that could be found at the bottom shelves of the romance section of bookstores, wrapped and bound with book covers that are decorated with Philippine comics-styled illustrations, such as "a barrio landscape with a badly dressed guy and girl locked in an embrace". As a form of "escapist fiction" (escapism) and "commercial literature", Tagalog romance novels generally follow a "strict romance formula", meaning the narratives have happy endings (a factor influencing the salability of the novel), the protagonists are wealthy, good-looking, smart, and characters that cannot die. Normally, the hero or heroine of the story falls in love and "goes crazy" over the admired person. However, later authors of Tagalog romance novels deviated from portraying so-called "damsel-in-distress and knight-in-shining-armor characters". Contemporary writers also turned away from writing "rags-to-riches plots". The stereotypical norm had been replaced by the incorporation of storylines with "interesting scenes, characters [who are ready to face challenges or to sacrifice themselves for the benefit of other people], dialogues, and new angles to old plots". Authors such as Maria Teresa Cruz San Diego, who used the pen names Maia Jose and Tisha Nicole, ventured into the fantasy romance genre, and into topics that are related to politics, ecology, gender issues, prostitution, mail-order bride syndicates, white slavery, non-governmental organizations, and breastfeeding programs. Apart from writing about ideal lovers (men and women) and ideal situations, other novelists wrote about true-to-life settings, or at least based the stories from personal experiences. Thus, Tagalog romance novels came to mirror or replicate the "roles that women and men play" in Philippine society.

The Tagalog novels in pocketbook or paperback format became the contemporary equivalent of the serial novels that appeared on the pages of Liwayway magazine novels and the illustrated novels of Philippine comics such as the Tagalog Komiks. A regular Tagalog-language romance pocketbook is composed of around 120 pages, with a dimension of 10 by 16 centimetres (3.9 in × 6.3 in), giving the book its characteristic portability, light-weight, and easy to pass on to other readers. The current price per book ranges from PHP 39.50 to PHP 54.50. The price of the pocketbook is dependent on the date of publication or the release date.

== History ==
Among the possible inspirations of publishing Tagalog romance paperback novels were the Mills & Boon and Harlequin Romance love story pocketbooks. The actual idea of publishing Tagalog romance paperbacks in the Philippines was conceptualized by Benjie Ocampo, the proprietor of Books for Pleasure, Inc., the company that carried the English-language Mills & Boon pocketbooks line in the country. Ocampo thought about the concept of selling Filipino romance novels in book format in 1983. In 1984, Ocampo's company published the Tagalog-language Valentine Romances line with a preliminary release of 5,000 copies. Although discontinued temporarily due to distribution-related issues, the publication of Valentine Romances was resumed after one year. The sales of the pocketbooks increased from 8,000 copies within a 3- to 4-month period to 10,000 copies over a period of 2 to 3 months, including provincial sales. In 1990, Anvil Publishing, the sister company of Books for Pleasure, targeted the Filipino male readers by publishing Pinoy Suspense, a pocketbook line that featured "original Filipino paperback thrillers". Later on, after eight months of producing Pinoy Suspense pocketbooks, Anvil Publishing released its own Tagalog-language paperback romance novels that were geared towards Filipino female readers. Although Books for Pleasure, Inc. closed down in 2002, other publishing companies came to produce Tagalog-language paperbacks. Among the contemporary and most popular Tagalog romance novel brands released in the Philippine books market was the Precious Heart Romance (PHR) line, a Tagalog pocketbook brand name published by the Precious Pages Corporation since 1992. Other Tagalog paperbrands include Love Match.

== Authorship ==
Most of the writers for Tagalog pocketbooks are females. However, there are also male novelists. In this case, there were publishers who required male contributors to use female pseudonyms because of the belief that female readers prefer female authors, and that women know other women better than men. Among the first Tagalog pocketbook writers were Edgar Reyes (also known as Edgardo Reyes), Lualhati Bautista, Helen Meriz, Gilda Olvidado, Ma. Elena cruz, Joi Barrios, Rosalie Matilac, Leo del Rogierro, Crisostomo Papa, Ernie Bueno, and Rosario Cruz Lucero. Apart from Maria Teresa Cruz San Diego (as Maia Jose or Tisha Nicole), other contemporary Tagalog pocketbook novelists were Camilla (pen name of Armine Rhea Mendoza), Martha Cecilia (Maribeth Dela Cruz in real life) Apple Masallo, and Paul Sevilla.

== Readership ==
Readers of Philippine comics, the popular literature in the Philippines from the early 1900s through the 1990s, moved into reading inexpensively priced Philippine romance novels. In terms of sales, Tagalog pocket romance books were winning over the Philippine comics industry. Among the readers of Tagalog-language paperbacks, apart from the local followers in the Philippines, are overseas Filipino workers, such as the female domestic helpers in Hong Kong. There are more female readers than males, and the female audience of Tagalog pocketbooks include young women and teenagers. Other readers set up a collection of Tagalog pocketbooks that they rent to other paperback enthusiasts for a designated fee.

== Challenges ==
The problems of publishing Tagalog romance novels included the issue of copyright violation. Among the methods used for infringing original pocketbooks were through scanning copies, changing the book covers, changing the titles, and changing the names of the authors.

== Film adaptation ==
Tagalog pocketbooks novels had been adapted into film and television. An example of a Tagalog romance novel that was adapted into television was Babes Cajayon's (under the pen name Martha Cecilia) Kristine, which is labelled as the "most successful series in Philippine romance pocketbook history".

== Significance ==
Together with the airing of Tagalog-language television shows and films, the publication of romance pocketbooks in Tagalog helped to further establish it as the national language of the Philippines (over one hundred languages are spoken in the Philippines with English and Tagalog being the only official state tongues).

The books have been particularly popular with younger Filipinos, in part due to the "oral and contemporary" character of the language used in writing the novels.

== Modern ==
Tagalog pocketbooks nowadays are rarely being used. Some of the alternatives of such are short stories posted in the internet and social media sites.

== See also ==
- List of Tagalog literary works
