= Dekada '70 (film) =

2002 historical drama film by Chito S. Roño

- Philippine theatrical poster
- Directed by: Chito S. Roño
- Written by: Lualhati Bautista
- Based on: Dekada '70 by Lualhati Bautista
- Produced by: Tess V. Fuentes
- Starring: Vilma Santos; Christopher de Leon; Piolo Pascual; Marvin Agustin; Danilo Barrios; John Wayne Sace
- Cinematography: Neil Daza
- Edited by: Jess Navarro
- Music by: Nonong Buencamino
- Production company: Star Cinema
- Distributed by: Star Cinema
- Release date: December 25, 2002
- Running time: 131 minutes
- Country: Philippines
- Language: Filipino
- Budget: ₱40 million (US$684,000)
- Box office: ₱65.096 million (US$1.113 million)

Dekada '70 (English: The '70s) is a 2002 Filipino historical political thriller drama film directed by Chito S. Roño and written by Lualhati Bautista, which was adapted from her 1983 novel of the same name. Set in the Philippines during the period of martial law under Ferdinand Marcos, the film follows the struggles of the middle-class Bartolome family spanning several years. It stars Vilma Santos and Christopher De Leon as parents raising five sons, played by Piolo Pascual, Carlos Agassi, Marvin Agustin, Danilo Barrios, and John Wayne Sace, amidst the tense political background.

Produced and distributed by Star Cinema, the film was theatrically released on December 25, 2002, as one of the official entries at the 28th Metro Manila Film Festival. It was later shown overseas through film festivals and retrospectives. In 2015, the film was digitally restored and remastered by ABS-CBN Film Archives.

== Plot ==
Incumbent President Ferdinand Marcos Sr. is re-elected for a second term, amidst anti-war protests during the Vietnam War. At dinner, brothers Julian "Jules" Bartolome Jr. and Isagani "Gani" Bartolome speak about the upcoming Junior-Senior Prom. Amanda, the mother of five children (including Jules and Gani) of the middle-class Bartolome family residing in Manila, finds a new advertising job, but her husband, Julián Bartolome Sr., infuriatingly opposes her decision. As they leave for home at night after a prom, the Bartolomes get stuck in traffic due to a protest with effigy burning near the Legislative Building.

In 1971, Jules and his best friend Willy participated in the student protest at the University of the Philippines Diliman. At the same time, Emmanuel "Em" Bartolome begins writing illegal exposés and other kinds of banned literature. Julián becomes furious when he discovers Jules and Willy's involvement, angrily explaining the suspension of the writ of habeas corpus and the disappearance of student leader Charlie del Rosario.

Gani discloses his intention to apply for a position in the United States Navy, arguing that employment with the American government offers a substantial salary and numerous benefits. Despite Jules furiously criticising his brother for a perceived lack of patriotism, Julián endorses the idea. Later, amidst another protest against Marcos, the youngest sibling, Benjamin "Bingo" Bartolome, retrieves a fallen kite, which Amanda discovers to be crafted from pages of the Communist newspaper Ang Bayan. Julián learns of Jules' activism when he stumbles upon their insurgent leaflets.

Marcos declares Martial law in 1972. Civilians were ordered to remove any form of political slogans and paraphernalia opposing Marcos under the threat of imprisonment for anyone suspected to be a sympathizer of Communism. Gani accidentally impregnates his girlfriend, Evelyn, and, much to her initial distress, is forced by her father into marrying her. The family learns of the death of Jules' best friend, Willy, at the hands of Metrocom for staying up past the curfew; Jules later reveals his plan to travel to Bicol and join the New People's Army (NPA) despite his mother's opposition.

In the mid-70s, Gani leaves for the United States, and Evelyn, after giving birth to a girl, also leaves the Bartolomes for her parents. Em also leaves for the Bataan Nuclear Power Plant to write an article about the protesters there. Jules, after leaving for a year, briefly returns home to treat his friend, René, of his injuries to avoid the police before leaving once more. During the Christmas season, Jules calls Amanda over after two months of not returning, warning that the NPA has been infiltrated, and requests that all of his anti-government pamphlets and Em's written articles be destroyed to save his family from possible persecution, successfully doing so when René, revealing himself to be a Metrocom informant, tips off their residence to the authorities.

Despite their success, however, Jules was later caught and imprisoned. Motivated by her son's experience of torture upon visiting him, Amanda sends an appeal to a non-governmental organization that reaches out to families of victims of human rights abuse. After family and friends celebrate Christmas with Jules in prison, Amanda and Julián discover that their younger son, Jason, didn't return home and was only discovered by Em at the morgue that he had been brutally murdered after he was initially imprisoned for a drug charge. Jules, aware of Jason's death, attends his younger brother's wake while escorted by the police, and breaks down in tears.

Frustrated by her helplessness and lack of self-worth, she threatens to separate from Julian as they blame one another for Jason's death. However, before she could do so, Bingo notifies his mother that Jules has been released from prison. The family set up a reunion dinner with Jules' new wife, Mara, Gani's wife, Evelyn, and their respective children, also in attendance. Jules announces he will be returning to the communist insurgency and Julián wishes him well. As they depart, Julián and Amanda tearfully reconcile, before they later attend a play about the revolution written by Em as they sing the national anthem with the entire family raising a clenched fist.

In 1983, opposition leader Ninoy Aquino was assassinated upon his return from exile in the United States. The Bartolome family attends his wake at the Santo Domingo Church in Quezon City, and the film ends as Amanda delivers her monologue to the viewers, while she joins a large group of activists at the Post Office Building.

== Cast ==
- Vilma Santos as Amanda Bartolome - a mother of the Bartolomes with five young sons and wife of Julián Bartolome Sr.
- Christopher de Leon as Julián Bartolome, Sr. - the head of the patriarchal Bartolome family and husband of Amanda Bartolome.
- Piolo Pascual as Julian "Jules" Bartolome Jr. - the first son of the Bartolomes. Jericho Rosales was the first choice to play Jules, but had to drop out of the role to focus on Pangako Sa 'Yo.
- Carlos Agassi as Isagani "Gani" Bartolome - the second child of the Bartolomes, who works in the United States Navy to provide for his family, despite Jules' opposition.
- Marvin Agustin as Emmanuel "Em" Bartolome - the third child of the Bartolomes, who writes banned literature whilst maintaining a mischievous, carefree outward personality.
- Danilo Barrios as Jason Bartolome - the fourth child of the Bartolomes.
- John Wayne Sace as Benjamin "Bingo" Bartolome - the fifth child and youngest of all the five brothers.
- Kris Aquino – a student leader.
- Ana Capri as Mara - the wife of Jules Bartolome, and an NPA fighter.
- Dimples Romana as Evelyn - the girlfriend and later wife of Isagani Bartolome.
- Jhong Hilario as Willy - Jules' best friend and activist. He was killed by torturers in 1972.
- Carlo Muñoz as René - Jules' comrade who is revealed to be Metrocom's informant.
- Tirso Cruz III as Evelyn's father - an unnamed character who pressures Gani and the Bartolome family into a shotgun wedding after hearing of his daughter's stay with the former.
- Orestes Ojeda as Dr. Rodrigo.
- Marianne de la Riva as Evelyn's mother - an unnamed character who is shown sobbing after Evelyn's return to the household, and is a witness to the shotgun wedding by Evelyn's unnamed father.
- Manjo del Mundo as Metrocom Police
- Cacai Bautista as a rallyist (uncredited)

== Reception ==
=== Accolades ===
Accolades received by Dekada '70
Year	Award	Category	Recipient(s)	Result	Ref.
2002	Metro Manila Film Festival	Best Picture	Dekada '70	2nd	
2002	Metro Manila Film Festival	Best Actor	Christopher de Leon	Nominated	
2002	Metro Manila Film Festival	Best Actress	Vilma Santos	Nominated	
2002	Metro Manila Film Festival	Best Supporting Actor	Piolo Pascual	Won	
2002	Metro Manila Film Festival	Best Child Performer	John Wayne Sace	Won	
2003	Gawad Urian Awards	Best Film	Dekada '70	Won	
2003	Gawad Urian Awards	Best Director	Chito S. Roño	Nominated	
2003	Gawad Urian Awards	Best Screenplay	Dekada '70	Won	
2003	Gawad Urian Awards	Best Actor	Christopher de Leon	Nominated	
2003	Gawad Urian Awards	Best Actress	Vilma Santos	Won	
2003	Gawad Urian Awards	Best Supporting Actor	Piolo Pascual	Won	
2003	Gawad Urian Awards	Best Production Design	Manny Morfe	Nominated	
2003	Gawad Urian Awards	Best Sound	Albert Michael Idioma and Alex Tomboc	Nominated	
2003	PMPC Star Awards for Movies	Best Actress	Vilma Santos	Won	
2003	PMPC Star Awards for Movies	Best Supporting Actor	Piolo Pascual	Won	
2003	PMPC Star Awards for Movies	Best Adapted Screenplay	Dekada '70 by Lualhati Bautista	Won	
2003	FAP Awards	Best Actress	Vilma Santos	Won	
2003	FAP Awards	Best Supporting Actor	Piolo Pascual	Won	
2003	FAP Awards	Best Story	Dekada '70 by Lualhati Bautista	Won	
2003	FAP Awards	Best Production Design	Manny Morfe	Won	
2003	Young Critics Circle (YCC) Awards	Best Film	Dekada '70; Directed by Chito S. Roño	Won	
2003	Young Critics Circle (YCC) Awards	Best Screenplay	Dekada '70; Written by Lualhati Bautista	Won	
2003	Young Critics Circle (YCC) Awards	Best Performers	Vilma Santos and Piolo Pascual	Won	
2003	Young Critics Circle (YCC) Awards	Best Cinematography and Visual Design	Neil Daza (director of photography); Manny Morfe (production design)	Nominated	
2003	Young Critics Circle (YCC) Awards	Best Editing	Jesus "Jess" Navarro	Nominated	
2003	Young Critics Circle (YCC) Awards	Best Sound and Aural Orchestration	Albert Michael Idioma and Alex Tomboc (sound engineers); Nonong Buencamino (music director	Won	

Gawad TANGLAW

- Best Film
- Best Director – Chito Roño
- Best Actress – Vilma Santos
- Best Actor – Christopher de Leon
- Best Supporting Actor – Piolo Pascual

25th Catholic Mass Media Awards

- Best Film

Cinema One's RAVE Awards

- Best Film
- Best Performance – Vilma Santos

Gawad Pasado

- Best Film
- Best Director – Chito Roño
- Best Screenplay – Lualhati Bautista
- Best Actress – Vilma Santos
- Best Actor – Christopher de Leon
- Best Supporting Actor – Piolo Pascual

CineManila International Film Festival

- Best Actress – Vilma Santos
- Netpack Film Awardee – Dekada '70
