= Ang Tala sa Panghulo =

1913 novel by Patricio Mariano

- Author: Patricio Mariano
- Language: Tagalog
- Genre: Novel
- Publisher: R. Martinez
- Publication date: 1913
- Publication place: Philippines
- Media type: Print
- Pages: 207
- Preceded by: Ang mga Anak Dalita

Ang Tala sa Panghulo ("The Bright Star at Panghulo") is a 1913 Tagalog-language romance novel written by Filipino novelist Patricio Mariano. The 207-page book was published in Manila by R. Martinez and was printed by the Imprenta at Litograpya Ni Juan Fajardo (Printer And Lithography By Juan Fajardo) during the American era in Philippine history. The novel is alternatively known as Ang Tala sa Panghulo: Nobelang Taga-ilog ("The Bright Star at Panghulo: A Riverine Novel"), which can also mean Ang Tala sa Panghulo: Nobelang Tagalog (the word Tagalog originated from the Tagalog-language word "taga-ilog" meaning riverine or river people), thus the alternative English translation is The Bright Star at Panghulo: A Tagalog Novel.

== Characters ==
The main characters of the novel are Berta and Lucia. Berta is the stereotypical young woman from the barrio, while Lucia was the stereotypic lass from Manila. Being a barrio resident, Berta is presented by the author as shy and modest, while Lucia – being a city girl – was portrayed as impatient, devious, and disloyal. Berta is a vendor of local delicacies. The other characters in the story are Luciano, Tintoy, and Mang Pedro (literally "Mr. Pedro"). Luciano is a painter and an affluent customer of Berta. Tintoy is the husband of Lucia. Mang Pedro, as revealed at the end of the novel, turns out to be the wealthy father of Berta and the owner of the house in Manila where Luciano resides.

== Plot ==
In the story, Lucia – although married – falls in love with Luciano. Tintoy, because of jealousy, shot Luciano during a hunt. Berta, while gathering dampalit (a local plant used as an ingredient in pickling), heard the shots. Berta saves and nurses Luciano. Luciano becomes Lucia’s lover. Berta reunites with Mang Pedro. There was a happy ending for Berta and Luciano, but not for Lucia and Tintoy.

== See also ==
- Juan Masili: Ang Pinuno ng Tulisan
- Ang mga Anak Dalita
