= Cinema Artists =

Filipino motion picture company

Cinema Artists (a/k/a Cinema Artists Philippines) is an independent Filipino motion picture company founded by Lino Brocka and Mike de Leon to produce and distribute the films that Brocka or de Leon directed.

The company was founded in 1974, two years before de Leon's feature debut, Itim.

== Films distributed by Cinema Artists ==
- Tinimbang Ka ngunit Kulang (1974)
- Tatlo, Dalawa, Isa (1975)
- Mortal (1975)
- Maynila: Sa mga Kuko ng Liwanag (1975) (dir. Brocka; cinematography by de Leon)
- Insiang (1976)
- Itim (1976) (de Leon's feature debut)
- Kay Dali ng Kahapon, ang Bagal ng Bukas (1985)
- Aliwan Paradise (1992) (short film)
- Southern Winds (1993)
- Bayaning Third World (2000)
- Citizen Jake (2018)
