= Mga Anak-Bukid =

1911 novel by Rosauro C. Almario

- Author: Rosauro C. Almario
- Language: Tagalog
- Genre: Novel
- Publisher: Limbagang Cultura Filipina
- Publication date: 1911
- Publication place: Philippines
- Media type: Print

Mga Anak-Bukid (literally "Children of the Farmlands", the title can be translated simply as "The Farmlanders") is a 1911 Tagalog-language novel written by Filipino novelist Rosauro C. Almario. Published by the Limbagang Cultura Filipina in Manila, Philippines, the novel narrates how the Filipinos who became the so-called pensionados undermined the traditional values and mores in the Philippines, including the people who acted as supporters and upholders of those conventional customs and norms.

== Description ==
Mga Anak-Bukid is about the life of an ordinary farming couple, namely Tonyo and Juli. They were supposed to get married, but on the day before the wedding ceremony, Juli was raped by the pensionado (literally "pensioner", someone receiving a salary or pension) named George, a Filipino representing the government of the United States. Through his job as a journalist, George criticized and attacked the traditional values and mores of the Filipinos in the Philippines. Through his newspaper columns, George dismissed the long-established rituals and practices in the Philippines as laughable, old-fashioned, and as things that should remain only in the past. In the meantime, Tonyo was still willing to marry Juli despite the circumstances. However, Juli was no longer enthusiastic in accepting Tonyo as her husband because her honor as a woman had been defiled. Honor and virginity is important in traditional Filipino culture. Tonyo avenged himself and Juli by tricking George. Unaware of the trap set by Tony and Juli, George agreed to meet with Juli. When George went to the appointed place, he was slain by Tonyo. Then Tonyo and Juli ran away into the mountains, both in agreement that there was no righteousness and hope for them if they stay in the lowlands. The book is made up of 78 pages.

== See also ==
- Satanas sa Lupa
