= Ang Lihim ng Isang Pulo =

- Author: Faustino Aguilar
- Language: Tagalog
- Genre: Novel
- Publisher: Sampaguita Press
- Publication date: 1927
- Publication place: Philippines
- Media type: Print
- Pages: 353
- Preceded by: Sa Ngalan ng Diyos
- Followed by: Ang Patawad ng Patay

Ang Lihim ng Isang Pulo: Nobelang Tagalog (kasaysayang ukol sa mga unang panahon) – "The Secret of an Island: A Tagalog Novel (history about times past)" – is a Tagalog-language novel written in 1926 by Filipino novelist Faustino S. Aguilar. The 353-page novel was first published by Sampaguita Press in the Philippines in 1927. It was republished in Manila by Benipayo Press in 1958.
