= Iniibig Kita... Father Salvador =

1976 Filipino film directed by Pablo Santiago

- Official movie poster
- Directed by: Pablo Santiago
- Screenplay by: Mar V. Puato
- Story by: Celso Al. Carunungan
- Starring: Vic Vargas; Helen Gamboa; Leila Hermosa; Jean Abelgas; Ellen Esguerra; Lito Garcia
- Cinematography: Alfonzo Alvarez
- Music by: Bel Cruz Jr.
- Production company: Amanah Films International
- Release date: May 1976
- Country: Philippines
- Language: Filipino

Iniibig Kita... Father Salvador (lit. 'I'm in love with you... Father Salvador') is a 1976 Filipino drama film directed by Pablo Santiago from a script by Mar V. Puato. Conceived by Celso Al. Carunungan, the plot concerns a parish priest who attempts to overcome the issues faced by a town with immoral politicians and businessmen. It stars Vic Vargas as the titular character, alongside Ricky Belmonte, Helen Gamboa, Leila Hermosa, Jean Abelgas, Ellen Esguerra and Lito Garcia. Produced by Amanah Films International, the film was released in May 1976.

Critic Justino Dormiendo of Sagisag gave the film a negative review.

== Cast ==
- Vic Vargas as Father Salvador
- Ricky Belmonte
- Helen Gamboa
- Leila Hermosa
- Jean Abelgas
- Ellen Esguerra
- Lito Garcia
- Ricky Santiago
- Dencio Padilla
- Joe Garcia
- Naty Bernardo
- Aurora Villa
- Ed Alcantara
- Edith Flores
- Fr. Ben Carreon
- Ben Rubio

== Production ==
=== Casting ===
Actors Vic Vargas and Helen Gamboa were cast against type for the drama film, with Vargas being previously known for his action films and Gamboa for her light comedies and musicals. Vargas previously collaborated with director Pablo Santiago in the epic films Perlas ng Silangan (1969) and Nueva Vizcaya (1973).

=== Principal photography ===
Shooting lasted for a month in Carcar, Cebu.

== Release ==
Iniibig Kita... Father Salvador was released in May 1976.

=== Critical response ===
Justino Dormiendo, writing for Sagisag, gave the film a negative review, criticizing its haphazard story flow that is "made worse by melodramatic music" and stated that "its view of the issues facing people in society is too simple, and its assessment of where people's 'immorality' comes from is too shallow."
