= Maria Teresa Cruz San Diego =

Filipino writer

Maria Teresa "Tessa" Cruz San Diego is a bestselling author of Tagalog romance novels in the Philippines. As a writer for the Tagalog pocketbooks industry, San Diego used the pen names such as Maia Jose and Tisha Nicole.

== Career ==
San Diego's first Tagalog romance novel was published in 1992 by Books for Pleasure, Inc. under the Valentine Romances line of paperbacks. San Diego's romantic novels included plots that are within the scope of fantasy romance and issues that are political, ecological, and gender-related. San Diego has already written around a hundred Tagalog romance novels in a span of two decades Apart from writing romances, San Diego was a mentor and trainer for the Basic Film Scriptwriting course sponsored by Star Cinema. San Diego also freelances as writer and editor for non-governmental organizations in the Philippines and abroad.

== See also ==
- Armine Rhea Mendoza
- Lualhati Bautista
- Edgardo Reyes
- Babes Cajayon
