= Armine Rhea Mendoza =

Filipino writer

Armine Rhea Mendoza is one of the most prolific writers of contemporary Tagalog romance novels in the Philippines. Using the pseudonym Camilla, which Mendoza adopted from a female warrior in the Iliad (see the Aeneid as well), Mendoza writes for Precious Heart Romances (PHR), the Tagalog pocketbooks brand published by Precious Pages Corporation since 1992. She was a magazine writer and editor before writing popular romance novel in a full-time capacity.

== Biography ==
Mendoza studied at the Ateneo de Manila University and the De La Salle University.

A productive romance-genre writer, Mendoza produces around thirty manuscripts annually. Her career in romance novel writing was influenced and jump-started by an aunt, Nanay Binya. Mendoza borrowed from her aunt's collection of Tagalog romance books that were published during the 1990s in order to study the style of popular romance writing. The characters in her romance books include Karen Kerengkeng, a female protagonist.

== See also ==
- Lualhati Bautista
- Edgardo Reyes
- Maria Teresa Cruz San Diego
- Babes Cajayon
