= Celso Al. Carunungan =

Filipino writer, novelist, and scriptwriter

- Born: January 7, 1923
- Died: February 15, 1988 (aged 65)
- Occupation(s): writer, novelist, scriptwriter

Celso Al. Carunungan (January 7, 1923 – February 15, 1988) was a Filipino writer, novelist, and scriptwriter in English and Filipino languages. In 1959, he won the Best Story prize from the Filipino Academy of Movie Arts and Sciences (FAMAS) for conceptualizing the story for the Tagalog-language film Biyaya ng Lupa ("Blessings of the Land"). He later conceived of the story for the 1976 drama film Iniibig Kita... Father Salvador. Among his works are Like a Big Brave Man, a novel published in New York in 1960 then in Manila in 1963; Return to Gomora and Other Stories (1963); Panorama of World Literature for Filipinos: Fourth Year (1966); Satanas sa Lupa (1971), a Tagalog novel; and To Die a Thousand Deaths: A Novel on the Life and Times of Lorenzo Ruiz. He was a production consultant for the 1982 American filmThe Year of Living Dangerously.
