= Juan Masili: Ang Pinuno ng Tulisan =

1906 novel by Patricio Mariano

- Author: Patricio Mariano
- Language: Tagalog
- Genre: Novel
- Publisher: Libreria Luzonica
- Publication date: 1906
- Publication place: Philippines
- Media type: Print
- Pages: 24
- Followed by: Ang mga Anak Dalita

Juan Masili: Ang Pinuno ng Tulisan ("Juan Masili: The Leader of Bandits" or "Juan Masili: The Bandit Leader") is a 1906 Tagalog-language novel written by Filipino novelist Patricio Mariano. Based on Project Gutenberg, the original format of the title of the novel was rendered as Juan Masili o Ang Pinuno ng Tulisan meaning "Juan Masili or The Leader of Bandits", therefore the title could stand alone either as Juan Masili or as Ang Pinuno ng Tulisan. The 24-page short novel was published in Manila, Philippines by Libreria Luzonica during the American era in Philippine history.

== Description ==
Juan Masili: Ang Pinuno ng Tulisan was a narrative that tackles the life of Juan Masili (literally "John Peppery"), a young man who experienced injustice at an early age. Masili becomes a bandit and a vigilante. Among his deeds include the efforts to reunite the pair of lovers named Benita and Enrique. Masili did so in order to "repay the kindness of Enrique's family". Enrique's family took care of Masili when he was orphaned early in his lifetime.

== See also ==
- Ang Tala sa Panghulo
