= Hilda Montaire =

Filipino writer

Hilda Suico Montayre (13 April 1922 – 2004) was a Filipino writer who often used the pseudonym Rosa Montes. She considered fellow Cebuana writer Maria Kabigon to be a major influence.

Montaire was born in Mandaue, Cebu City on 13 April 1922. She studied at the Colegio de la Immaculada Concepcion in Cebu City, where she edited Blue and White, the CIC school paper, Far Eastern University and the University of Santo Tomas, Manila.

She began writing at an early age. Her career took off after World War II when her short stories and serialized novels were published in Bisaya magazine. Montaire and Austregelina Espina-Moore were the only Cebuano female novelists during that time period. Her novel Ikaduhang Sugo was published by E. Q. Cornejo and Sons in 1971. Among her Cebuano novels are Villa Rosario Conde (1967), Miraflor (1969) and Ikaduhang Sugo (1972)

Montaire worked at numerous radio stations and was at one time the host of “Ang Mga Tambag ni Inday Loling,” an advice program. She died in 2004.
