= Faustino Aguilar =

3rd Secretary of the Senate of the Philippines
- In office 1922–1931
- Preceded by: Fernando Maria Guerrero
- Succeeded by: Fermin Torralba

Personal details
- Born: Faustino S. Agular; February 15, 1882 Malate, Manila, Captaincy General of the Philippines
- Died: July 24, 1955 (aged 73) Sampaloc, Manila, Philippines

Faustino S. Aguilar (February 15, 1882 – July 24, 1955) is a pioneering Filipino novelist, journalist, revolutionary, union leader, and editor. Faustino was one of the first novelists in the Philippines to explore and present social realism through literature. He was the editor of Taliba (Philippine newspaper-1910)

.[2][3][4]

== Career ==
=== As journalist ===
He was the editor of the Taliba, a newspaper in the Philippines.

=== As novelist ===
As a novelist, he authored the Tagalog-language novels Busabos ng Palad (Pauper of Fate) in 1909, Sa Ngalan ng Diyos (In the Name of God) in 1911, Ang Lihim ng Isang Pulo (The Secret of an Island) in 1926, Ang Patawad ng Patay (The Pardon of the Dead) in 1951, Ang Kaligtasan (The Salvation) in 1951, and Pinaglahuan (Place of Disappearance) in 1906 (published in 1907). As a revolutionary, Faustino was a member of the Katipunan. His novels portrayed themes of ruthlessness and injustice in society.

=== As revolutionary ===
Aguilar became a Katipunan member when he was fourteen years old.

=== As civil servant ===
Aguilar worked in different branches of the Philippine government. One particular office is the Department of Labor.
