= Anti-Communist Labor Union of the Philippines =

Filipino trade union organization

The Anti-Communist Labor Union of the Philippines was a Filipino trade union organization. It was formed in the late 1930s, as a regroupment by conservative labour leaders. Its leaders included Ruperto Cristobal, Aurelio Intertas and Pedro Fernandez. One of the few public actions of the organization was to send a delegation to the Anti-Communist Conference in Tokyo, consisting of Jose I. Baluyot and Aurelio Alvero (Cristobal was scheduled to attend, but could not travel).
