= Dekada '70 (novel) =

1983 novel by Lualhati Bautista

- Cover of the 2009 edition
- Author: Lualhati Bautista
- Translator: Book cover for Lualhati Bautista's Dekada '70.
- Cover artist: Glenn Anthony Tolo
- Language: Filipino
- Genre: Political, historical fiction
- Publisher: Jingle Clan; Carmelo & Bauermann Printing Corp. (1988); Cacho Publishing House (1991)
- Publication date: 1983
- Publication place: Philippines
- Media type: Print (Hardcover/Softcover)
- Pages: 228 (2009 edition)
- ISBN: 971-17-9023-8

Dekada '70 (pronounced as dekada sitenta / lit. 'The '70s') is a Filipino novel by Lualhati Bautista. It tells the story of a middle-class family in Manila living through martial law under Ferdinand Marcos. The novel was awarded the 1983 Palanca Award Grand Prize.

== Translations ==
An English-language translation by Clarisse de Jesus was self-published by Bautista. In 2022, it was reported by Bautista that Penguin Random House was offering to publish an English-language translation as part of the Penguin Classics series.

== Adaptations ==
The novel was adapted as a 2002 film of the same name under Star Cinema, directed by Chito S. Roño, and with a screenplay by Lualhati Bautista. The film starred Vilma Santos and Christopher de Leon with Piolo Pascual, Carlos Agassi, Marvin Agustin, Danilo Barrios, John Wayne Sace, and Kris Aquino. It showed at the Metro Manila Film Festival, where it was awarded second Best Picture after Mano Po, with Pascual winning Best Supporting Actor. At the 26th Gawad Urian Awards, it tied with Mga Munting Tinig for Best Film. It also won Best Screenplay for Bautista, Best Actress for Santos, and Best Supporting Actor for Pascual. The film was the Philippines' official submission for the Academy Award for Best Foreign-Language Film but failed to get nominated.

In 2018, the novel was adapted as a musical first staged at the University of the Philippines and then restaged at Ateneo de Manila University.
