= Patricio Mariano =

Filipino nationalist, revolutionary, pundit, dramatist, writer, violinist and painter

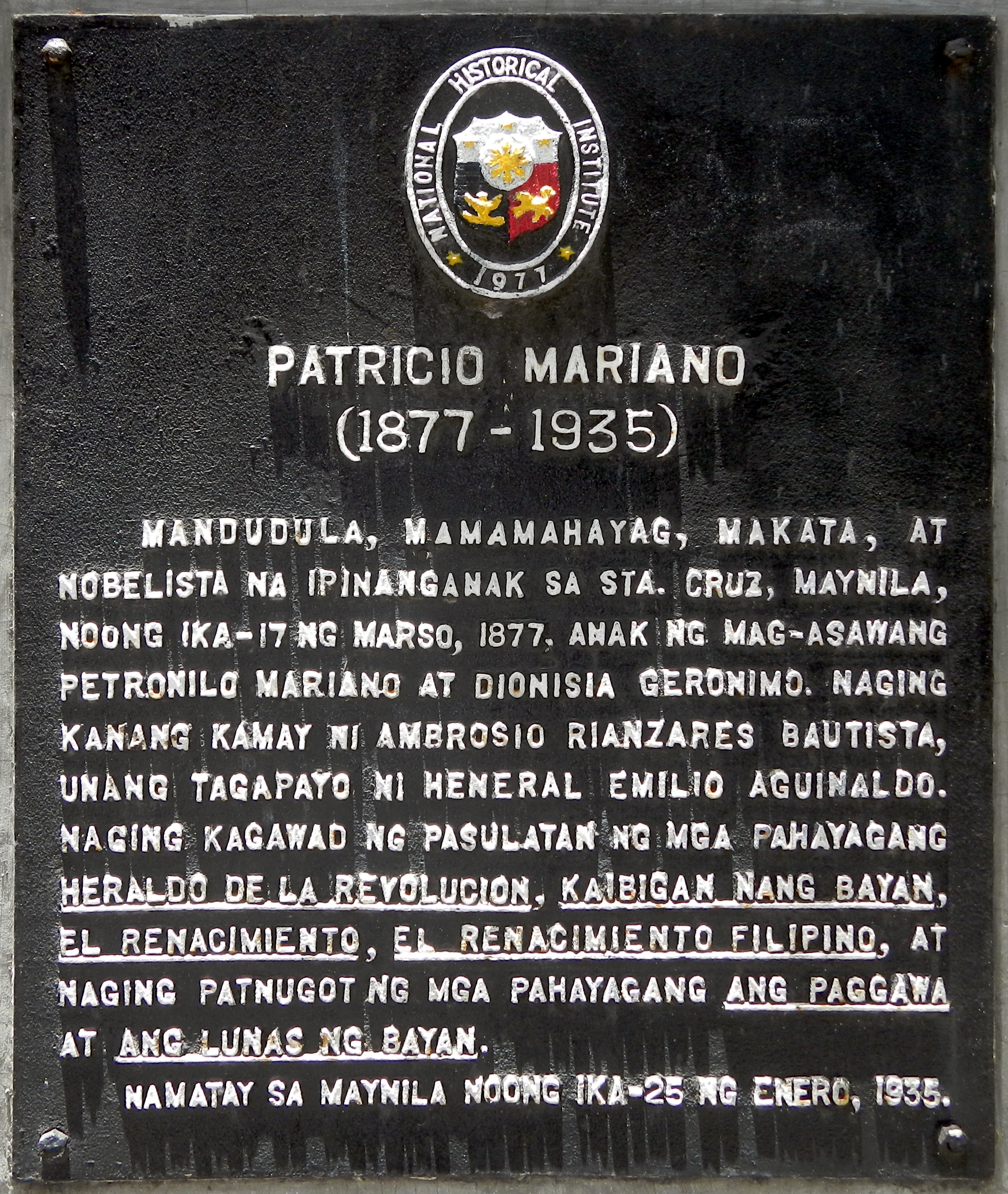
Historical marker created by the National Historical Institute in 1977 to commemorate Patricio Mariano.

Patricio Mariano y Geronimo (17 March 1877 at Santa Cruz, Manila – 28 January 1935), son of Petronilo Mariano and Dionisia Geronimo, was a Filipino nationalist, revolutionary, pundit, poet, playwright, dramatist, short story writer, novelist, journalist, violinist, painter, and a Katipunan member.

== Education ==
Mariano received his high school education at the Ateneo Municipal de Manila (now known as the Ateneo de Manila University) and at the Colegio de San Juan de Letran. He studied bookkeeping at the Escuela de Artes y Oficios and received his Bachelor of Arts degree from the Liceo de Manila (now known as the Manila Central University).

== Political career ==
Mariano was influenced by his employer José Dizon, a Katipunan leader and typography and stereography shop owner, to join the Katipunan. Mariano joined the Filipino revolution in 1896; however, he fought only at the end of the struggle. In 1898, he became a public servant during the First Philippine Republic, acting as the right-hand man of Ambrosio Rianzares Bautista, who was the adviser to General Emilio Aguinaldo, the president of the First Philippine Republic. As a patriot, Mariano was one of the founders of the organization known as the Asociacion Pro Patria.

== Literary career ==
At a time when the Tagalog Theater was beginning to evolve, Mariano pursued a career as a playwright by writing zarzuelas in Tagalog. He also wrote poetry, short stories, dramas, and operettas, focusing on romance, social conditions, and the hopes of the Filipino people and incorporating symbolism in his work. Some of his better known plays include Sampaguita ("Jazmine"), performed in 1901 at the Zorrilla Theater, the one-act drama Ang Silanganan ("The East" or "The Levant") at the Rizal Theater in Tondo, Manila on 30 December 1904, and Ang Pakakak ("The Tuba"), another one-act work, at the Manila Grand Opera House on 7 July 1913.,

He also wrote a three-act opera, Lakangbini, with music composed by Jose Estella. The opera was performed at the Metropolitan Theatre in 1933.

== Journalistic career ==
Armed with his experience in printing, Mariano utilized his skills at the Imprenta de Malolos, a printing press located at Barasoain in Malolos, Bulacan, ultimately becoming manager. As a journalist, Mariano wrote articles for periodicals such as the El Heraldo de la Revolucion (The Herald of the Revolution) and the Ang Kaibigan ng Bayan (The Friend of the Nation). After the war, Mariano edited and wrote for other publications including Los Obreros, Ang Paggawa, Katwiran, Lunas ng Bayan, El Renacimiento Filipino, La Vanguardia, and Taliba.

== Translation career ==
As a translator, Mariano translated into the Tagalog language operas such as Lucia di Lammermoor and the third act of La traviata. Mariano translated José Rizal's novels, namely Noli Me Tángere and El filibusterismo, from the Spanish originals.

== Literary associations ==
As a playwright and a journalist, Mariano became a member of many literary organizations during his lifetime. Among the organizations he was associated with, Mariano was a member of the Union de Artistas (Artists Union), the Union de Impresores (Printers' Union), the Buklod na Ginto (Gold Circle), the Aklatang Bayan (National Library), and the Lupong Tagapagpalaganap ng Akademya ng Wikang Tagalog (Board of Spreaders of the Academy of the Tagalog Language).

== Death ==
Mariano succumbed to the effects and complications of a neck tumor and died in 1935.

== Works ==
=== Plays ===
- Sampaguita ("Jazmine") (1901)
- Ang Silanganan ("The East" or "The Levant") (a one-act drama) (1904)
- Ang Pakakak ("The Tuba") (a one-act drama) (1913)
- Anak ng Dagat ("Child of the Sea")

=== Novels ===
- Juan Masili: Ang Pinuno ng Tulisan (1906)
- Ang mga Anak Dalita (1911)
- Ang Tala sa Panghulo (1913)
