= Satanas sa Lupa =

1970 novel by Celso Al. Carunungan

- Author: Celso Al. Carunungan
- Language: Tagalog
- Genre: Novel
- Publication date: 1970
- Publication place: Philippines
- Media type: Print

Satanas sa Lupa (“Satan on Earth”), subtitled “nobelang pangkasalukuyan” (“Present-day Novel”), is a 1970 Tagalog-language novel by Filipino author and scriptwriter Celso Al. Carunungan, one of the “titans of Philippine literature”. The novel criticizes the Philippine government and society during the early part of the 1970s, a reason why the author had been included among the group known as "Class 1081", Filipinos imprisoned when Martial Law was declared by Ferdinand Marcos in 1972.

Apart from being one of the political novels in the Philippines from 1967 to 1972 that "represented a clamor for change in society" (Filipino: kinatawan ng paghingi ng pagbabago sa lipunan), Satanas sa Lupa was one of the novels in the Philippines that incorporated romanticism in its plot using the "love triangle" (Filipino: tatsulukan ng pag-ibig) genre, a genre that began in the Philippines in 1906 through another novel entitled Juan Masili by another Filipino author named Patricio Mariano. The love triangle in Satanas sa Lupa is between the characters Benigno Talavera, Conrado, and Chona.

== Description ==
According to Ruby Gamboa-Alcantara in her "Romantisismo, Estilong Pilipino" Itinatak sa Nobelang Tagalog ("Romanticism, Filipino Style" Stamped on the Tagalog Novel), the character Benigno Talavera was the representative of Philippine politics in Satanas sa Lupa. Talavera was a "formerly good citizen" who was influenced by three other Congressmen (Filipino: Konggresista) Carpio, David, and Balbino. The three were cheating each other for the sake of climbing up the ladder of power and for gaining wealth. In Satanas sa Lupa, the reign of greed was ended by the persecution of Senator Morales, the death of Talavera, and the burning of evidence used to blackmail Talavera. The evidence was burned by Talavera's wife, Virginia. The other circumstances presented in Satanas sa Lupa were the drug addiction of Ismael, the son of Talavera; the pregnancy out of wedlock and motherhood as a single woman by Esther, the daughter of Talavera; the love affair between Contrado and Chona; and the elopement of Conrado and Chona (Conrado was supposed to become a priest). According to Gamboa-Alcantara, there is an unrealistic circumstance in Satanas sa Lupa, which is the excessive portrayal of Virginia, the wife of Talavera,and mother, due to the use of Philippine-style romanticism.

== See also ==
- Mga Anak-Bukid
