= Rosauro Almario =

Filipino writer

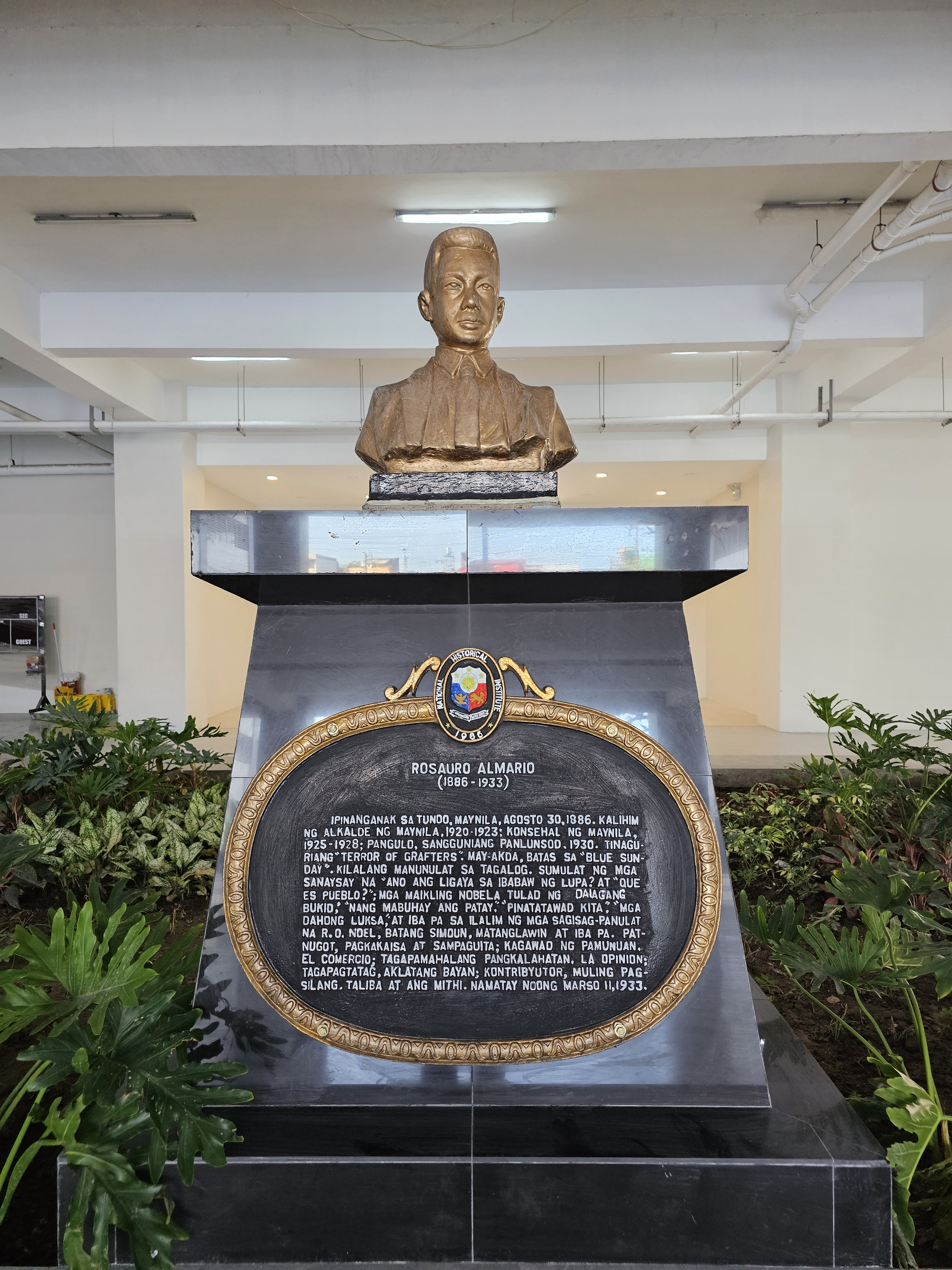
Bust and historical marker for Almario at his namesake elementary school in Tondo, Manila

Rosauro Cagne Almario (30 August 1886 – 11 March 1933) was a prominent Filipino writer in the Tagalog language. He was a respected journalist, editor, nationalist, politician, newspaper manager, and a proponent of anti-graft practices. Almario's works revealed his inclination to nationalism, revolutionary ideas, tradition, and customs. He supported the development of writing literature using Tagalog and the other languages of the Philippines. As a writer, Almario used pen names such as R.O. Noel, Batang Simoun, Matanglawin, Ric A. Clarin, Raxa Soliman, Petronio, and El Satirin. He was also known as the editor of Pagkakaisa, a daily newspaper, and he also was a general manager of the La Opinion newspaper-1926.

== Family ==
Born in Tondo, Manila, Almario was the third among nine children. He was the son of Estanislao Almario and Rosalia Cagne. Estanislao Almario was a cabeza de barangay (barangay captain or head of the barrio) who once served as a clerk in the Spanish military, while Rosalia Cagne was a seamstress. Almario’s father died when Almario was only around ten years of age. He married Leonor de Ocampo, with whom Almario had five children, namely the twins Generoso and Amalia, Bonifacio, Liwayway, and Simoun. Generoso Almario was a lawyer and Simoun Almario had an executive position at a local radio station.

== Education ==
He was taught by two teachers during his childhood. One was by the teacher known as "Maestro Sevilla". The other teacher was Eugenio de Lara. De Lara was a lawyer and a Tondo school supervisor who taught Almario elementary Latin. Almario studied the Spanish language and the English language at the Liceo de Manila. He wanted to become a lawyer but was not able to complete his studies for the degree.

== Career ==
=== Political career ===
Almario worked for the Bazar Siglo XX, a place owned by Luis R. Yangco. After passing the second-grade civil service examination, Almario began working as a clerk at the Bureau of Education on 10 August 1904. By 6 July 1909, he started working for the Bureau of Prisons, and then moved to the Bureau of Posts on 18 January 1911. He became chief of the Office of the Mayor in Manila on 1 August 1918. In 1919, Almario became the assistant secretary of Mayor Justo Lukban. On 6 July 1920, Almario became the secretary of Mayor Ramon Fernandez. Apart from being Mayor Fernandez's secretary, Almario acted as the supervisor of Manila's reformatories, asylums, and playgrounds. Both Fernandez and Almario resigned, as a sign of protest, upon the reinstatement of Governor-General Leonard Wood to the secret service of the City of Manila. He won a seat for the Municipal Board of Manila (now Manila City Council) in 1925. Although a known graft-buster, Almario was convicted for libel and was exiled to Lolomboy, Bocaue, Bulacan in February 1927. The case made him a popular figure among the masses. In 1928, he won the Municipal Board elections in Manila. In 1930, Almario became president of the Municipal Board of Manila.

=== Literary career ===
Almario was the editor of Pagkakaisa, a daily newspaper. He later became the general manager of the La Opinion newspaper. Among his works as a writer was the Tagalog-language essay Ano ang Ligaya sa Ibabaw ng Lupa? (What is Happiness on the Surface of the Earth?) written in 1907 and the award-winning Spanish-language essay Que Es Pueblo (What is [a] Town). His novels included the titles Pinatatawad Kita [You are Forgiven] (1910), Ang Mananayaw [The Dancer] (1910), Mga Anak-Bukid [Children of the Farmlands] (1911), Mga Dahong Luksa [Grieving Leaves] (1912), and Nang Si Eba ay Likhain [When Eve was Created] (1913).

There is a school in Tondo manila named after Him.
