= Una Mestiza =

1887 painting by Juan Luna

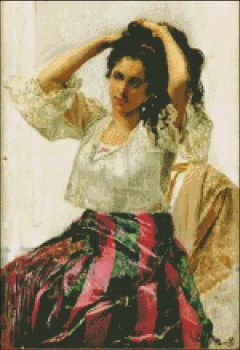
- Artist: Juan Luna
- Year: 1887
- Location: Victor Balaguer Library Museum

The Una Mestiza ("A Mestiza"), sometimes referred to as La Mestiza ("The Mestiza"), is an 1887 painting by Filipino painter and hero Juan Luna. The masterpiece is also known as La mestiza en su tocador which translates into English as The Mestiza at Her Dressing Table or Mestiza Lady at Her Dresser. Una Mestiza is also alternately called Charing. Coincidentally, this alternate title is the nickname of Luna's sister-in-law Rosario Melgar. Luna donated Una Mestiza to the Biblioteca Museu Victor Balaguer (Victor Balaguer Library Museum) of Vilanova i la Geltrú in the province of Barcelona in Spain. The Una Mestiza painting won an award at the Exposicion General de las Filipinas (Philippine General Exposition).
