= Edgardo M. Reyes =

Filipino novelist and screenwriter (1936–2012)

- Born: Edgardo M. Reyes; September 20, 1936; Commonwealth of the Philippines
- Died: May 15, 2012 (aged 75); Antipolo, Philippines
- Occupations: Novelist, screenwriter
- Years active: 1975–2001

Edgardo M. Reyes (September 20, 1936 – May 15, 2012) was a Filipino novelist. His works of fiction first appeared in the Tagalog magazine, Liwayway. His novels include Sa mga Kuko ng Liwanag and Laro sa Baga.

== His works and Philippine cinema ==
Aside from being a novelist, Edgardo M. Reyes was also a screenwriter. His film credits include Sa Kagubatan ng Lungsod (The Jungle in the City) (1975), Hoy Mister Ako ang Misis Mo (Hey Mister I Am Your Wife) (1976), and Uod at Rosas (Of Worms and Roses) (1982), which were cited and reviewed in the New York Times.

== Sa mga Kuko ng Liwanag ==
Edgardo M. Reyes's Tagalog novel Sa mga Kuko ng Liwanag was adapted into film by Philippine director Lino Brocka under the title Maynila, Sa mga Kuko ng Liwanag (Manila: In the Claws of Light). It had been spotlighted once more at the Walter Read Theater of the Lincoln Center from July 31 through August 20, 1999. It was included in the said film festival to celebrate the 100th year of Philippine Independence organized by the Film Society of Lincoln Center, in partnership with the Philippine Centennial Commission, the Cultural Center of the Philippines, IFFCOM, the Philippine Information Agency, the Consulate General of the Philippines in New York and the Philippine Centennial Coordinating Council – Northeast USA. The book version was republished in the Philippines by the De La Salle University Press in 1986.

== Laro sa Baga ==
=== The Film ===
Edgardo M. Reyes's Laro sa Baga (Playing with Fire) has also been made into a movie in 2000. The feature film, with English subtitles, was screened during the 2005 New York Filipino Film Festival from June 10 through 16, 2005, at the ImaginAsian Cinema, 239 East 59 Street.

Laro sa Baga is an erotic romantic odyssey: an intense drama of a young couple who fall in love while exploring the politics of sexual awakening and social relations. A racy movie with full-frontal male nudity, the film examines how innocence can easily turn into deceit, and how tender passions can unexpectedly explode into violence. Several subplots in the novel were compromised for the screenplay such as the exclusion of characters Victoria Gonzaga and her daughter of unclarified origin, Teng. Other subplots were intertwined to cut the main plotline short. It was directed by Filipino director Chito Roño, with a cast of actors that include Carlos Morales and Ara Mina. It won best picture during the Urian 2000.

== Writing credits (filmography) ==
- Laro sa Baga (2000), film adaptation and screenplay
- Tundo: Isla Puting Bato (1977), story and screenplay

== See also ==
- Lualhati Bautista
- Manuel Buising
