= Soledad Reyes =

Filipina writer and academic

- Born: Soledad Sarmiento Reyes; March 5, 1946 (age 80)
- Education: Maryknoll College (BA); Ateneo de Manila University (M.A.); University of Essex (M.A.); University of the Philippines Diliman (Ph.D.)

Soledad Sarmiento Reyes (born March 5, 1946) is a Philippine literature scholar, literary and art critic, author, anthologist, consultant, professor, instructor, editor, annotator, researcher, and essayist in the Philippines. Specializing in the field of popular culture and the arts in the Philippines, Reyes is a professor teaching interdisciplinary studies at the University of the Philippines Diliman and Ateneo de Manila University. She is an accomplished author of books and anthologies. "sa nobela mababalatuba ang mga pangyayati sa buhay ng isang kagawad sa union

== Education ==
In 1966, Reyes received her Bachelor of Arts degree from Maryknoll College (now known as Miriam College. She obtained a master's degree, from Ateneo de Manila University. She completed her Ph.D. in Philippine Studies at the University of the Philippines Diliman in 1976. In 1981, Reyes obtained her Masters in Arts degree in the field of Sociology of Literature from University of Essex in England.

== Career ==
Apart from teaching and acting as a consultant for Philippine and international universities, Reyes acted as the Chair of the Board of Judges for the Carlos Palanca and Cultural Center of the Philippines awards. As an exchange professor at the Peking University in China in 1977, Reyes focused on the preparation of modules regarding Philippine literature and popular culture. In 1987, Reyes lectured about Philippine literature, culture, and history at the Xiamen University in China. From 1987 to 1995, she was a board member of the Writers' Union of the Philippines (Unyon ng mga Manunulat ng Pilipinas, UMPIL). During the Peking University-Ateneo de Manila University Exchange Program in 1992, Reyes was assigned as the delegate of the Ateneo de Manila University. Beginning 2001, Reyes served as the editor of the Humanities section of the Loyola Schools Review. She was a member of the PEN-International. Reyes is the editor and annotator of the 100 Nobelang Tagalog Project (100 Tagalog Novels Project) of Filipiniana.net, a digital library based in the Philippines.

== Works ==
Reyes authored works such as the Nobelang Tagalog, 1905-1975: Tradisyon at Modernismo ("Tagalog Novel, 1905-1975: Tradition and Modernism", 1982), The Romance Mode in Philippine Popular Literature and Other Essays (1991), Kritisismo: Mga Teorya at Antolohiya Para sa Epektibong Pagtuturo ng Panitikan ("Criticism, Theories and Anthologies for the Effective Teaching of Literature", 1992) and Pagbasa ng Panitikan at Kulturang Popular: Piling Sanaysay, 1976-1999 ("Reading Literature and Popular Culture, Selected Essay, 1976-1999). Among the anthologies Reyes edited were Katha ("Creation", 1992), Ang Silid na Mahiwaga: Kalipunan ng Kuwento't Tula ng mga Babaeng Manunulat ("The Mysterious Room: Compilation of Stories and Poems by Female Writers", 1994), and ALIW! Essays on Popular Culture (2000).

In her 2009 essay, From Darna to Zsazsa Zaturnnah: Desire and Fantasy and Other Way, Reyes compared two Filipino superheroines existing in contemporary Philippine popular culture and literature, namely Darna and Zsazsa Zaturnnah. According to Reyes, Darna was the modern-day superheroine rooted and molded in Philippine folklore and tradition, while ZsaZsa Zaturnnah was "unarguably a postmodern text that could have emerged only in the twenty-first century, a period of awesome advances in science and technology, and/or frightening borderless wars." Reyes's use of the phrase postmodern hero or postmodern text to describe ZsaZsa Zaturnnah the superheroine and graphic novel was further explained by Emilou Lindsay Mata Mendoza and Irene Villarin Gonzaga in their Visual Literacy and Popular Culture in the Philippine Literature Classroom: Teaching Filipino Literature through the Graphic Novel, as a comparison between Darna, the female superhero, and ZsaZsa Zaturnnah, the effeminate superhero. Darna was the traditional mold of a Filipino superheroine (gender-wise, a true female superhero) while ZsaZsa Zaturnnah was an "outright subversion" of the conventional form of that superheroine. Because ZsaZsa Zaturnnah is, in reality, a homosexual male or "gay man" named Ada (from Adrian) who works as a beautician (i.e. cosmetologist, hair stylist, and nail stylist), but is able to transform himself into "a voluptuous, red-haired Darna-like [real] woman who possesses super powers" whenever he swallows a magical stone and shouts the word "Zaturnnah". In short, ZsaZsa Zaturnnah is in reality a man who literally experiences a sex/ gender change whenever he becomes the superheroine.

== Awards ==
The awards Reyes obtained include recognitions for her From Darna to Zsazsa Zaturnnah: Desire and Fantasy and Other Way and A Dark Tinge to the World: Selected Essays 1987-2005. In 2009, Reyes was conferred the rank of Professor Emeritus (together with two other Loyola Schools faculty members of the Ateneo de Manila University, namely Jose A. Marasigan and Mari-Jo P. Ruiz) for her exceptional service and distinguished academic record. Reyes's Nobelang Tagalog 1905-1975: Tradisyon at Modernismo, an anthology tracing the history of Tagalog-language novels has been considered a landmark in Philippine literature, and was granted a Philippine National Book Awards in 1982 by the Manila Critics Circle.
