= Lualhati Bautista =

Filipino writer (1945–2023)

- Born: Lualhati Torres Bautista; December 2, 1945; Tondo, Manila, Commonwealth of the Philippines
- Died: February 12, 2023 (aged 77); Quezon City, Philippines
- Education: Lyceum of the Philippines University
- Occupations: Novelist; screenwriter; activist
- Parents: Esteban Bautista (father); Gloria Torres (mother)

Signature
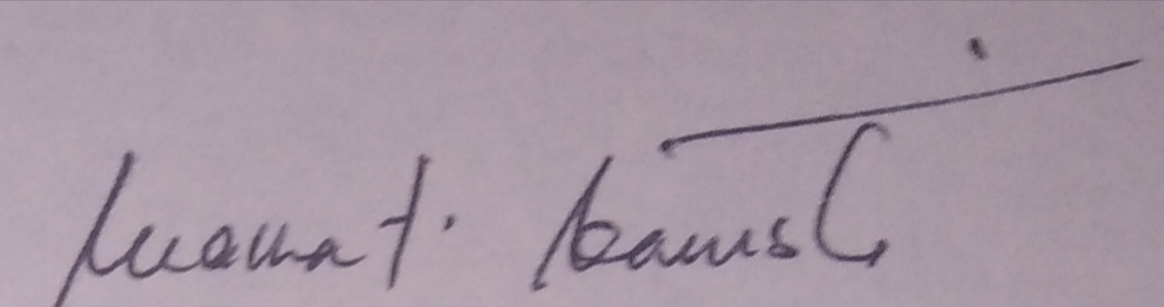

Lualhati Torres Bautista (December 2, 1945 – February 12, 2023) was a Filipina writer, liberal activist, and political critic. Her most popular novels are Dekada '70 (1983), Bata, Bata... Pa'no Ka Ginawa?, and 'GAPÔ (both 1988).

== Biography ==
Bautista was born in Tondo, Manila, Philippines, on December 2, 1945, to Esteban Bautista and Gloria Torres. She graduated from Emilio Jacinto Elementary School in 1958, and from Florentino Torres High School in 1962. She was a journalism student at the Lyceum of the Philippines, but dropped out because she had always wanted to be a writer and schoolwork was taking too much time. Her first short story, "Katugon ng Damdamin," was published in Liwayway magazine and thus started her writing career.

Despite lacking formal literary training, Bautista became known for her realist writing style and for addressing issues affecting women in the Philippines. Her works frequently featured female protagonists dealing with challenges in domestic life and the workplace.

== Career ==
=== Novels ===
Bautista garnered several Palanca Awards (1980, 1983, and 1984) for her novels ‘GAPÔ, Dekada '70 and Bata, Bata… Pa'no Ka Ginawa?, which exposed injustices and chronicled women's activism during the Marcos era.

‘GAPÔ, the Palanca Awards 1980 grand prize winner, published in 1988, is the story of a man coming to grips with life as an Amerasian. It is multilayered scrutiny of the politics behind US bases in the Philippines, seen from the point of view of ordinary citizens living in Olongapo City.

Dekada '70 is the story of a family caught in the middle of the tumultuous decade of the 1970s. It details how a middle-class family struggled and faced the changes that empowered Filipinos to rise against the Marcos government. These events happened after the bombing of Plaza Miranda, the suspension of the writ of habeas corpus, the proclamation of martial law and the random arrests of political prisoners. The oppressive nature of the Marcos regime, which made the people become more radical, and the shaping of the decade were all witnessed by the female protagonist, Amanda Bartolome, the mother of five boys.

Bata, Bata… Pa'no Ka Ginawa?, literally, "Child, Child… How Were You Made?", narrates the life of Lea, a working mother and a social activist, who has two children. In the end, all three, and especially Lea, have to confront Philippine society's view of single motherhood. The novel deals with the questions of how it is to be a mother, and how a mother executes this role through modern-day concepts of parenthood.

Bautista's 2013 book In Sisterhood received the Filipino Readers' Choice Award Nominee for Fiction in Filipino/Taglish in 2014, organized by the Filipino Book Bloggers Group.

In 2015, Bautista launched the book Sixty in the City, about the life of friends Guia, Roda and Menang, who are in their mid-60s and realize that there's a good life in being just a wife, mother and homemaker.

=== Short stories ===
Two of Bautista's short stories won the Palanca Awards, namely "Tatlong Kwento ng Buhay ni Juan Candelabra" ("Three Stories in the Life of Juan Candelabra"), first prize, 1982; and "Buwan, Buwan, Hulugan mo Ako ng Sundang" ("Moon, Moon, Drop Me a Dagger"), third prize, 1983.

In 1991 Bautista with Cacho Publishing House, published a compilation of short stories entitled Buwan, Buwan, Hulugan Mo Ako ng Sundang: Dalawang Dekada ng Maiikling Kuwento.

=== Screenplays ===
Bautista's venture as a screenwriter produced several critically acclaimed works. Her first screenplay was Sakada (Seasonal Sugarcane Workers), 1976, which exposed the plight of Filipino peasants. Her second film was Kung Mahawi Man ang Ulap in 1984, which was nominated for awards in the Film Academy of the Philippines. Also written during the same year was Bulaklak ng City Jail, based on her novel about imprisoned women, which won almost all awards for that year from various awards guilds including Star Awards and Metro Manila Film Festival. In 1998 her work was used for Chito Rono's film adaptation of Bata Bata Paano Ka Ginawa, starring Vilma Santos. In 2000 she wrote Gusto Ko Nang Lumigaya, the screenplay for Maryo J. de los Reyes' political drama thriller.

=== Other activities ===
Bautista became a national fellow for fiction of the University of the Philippines Diliman Creative Writing Center in 1986. She also served as vice-president of the Screenwriters Guild of the Philippines and as chair of the Kapisanan ng mga Manunulat ng Nobelang Popular.

She was the only Filipino included in a book on foremost international women writers published in Japan in 1991.

Bautista was honored by the Ateneo Library of Women's Writings on March 10, 2004, during the 8th Annual Lecture on Vernacular Literature by Women. In 2005, the Feminist Centennial Film Festival presented her with a recognition award for her outstanding achievement in screenplay writing. In 2006, she was given the Diwata Award for best writer by the 16th International Women's Film Festival of the UP Film Center.

== Translations of her novels ==
Excerpts of Bautista's novels have been anthologized in Tulikärpänen, a book of short stories written by Filipino women published in Finland by The Finnish-Philippine Society (FPS), a non-governmental organization founded in 1988. Tulikärpänen was edited and translated by Riitta Vartti, et al. In Firefly: Writings by Various Authors, the English version of the Finnish collection, the excerpt from the Filipino novel Gapô was given the title "The Night in Olongapo," while the excerpt from Bata, Bata, Pa'no Ka Ginawa? was titled "Children's Party."

A full translation of Bautista's best works could better represent the characteristics of Filipino writing in international publishing. Dekada '70 has been translated to the Japanese language and was published by Mekong Publishing House in the early 1990s. An English translation by Clarisse B. De Jesus, titled The '70s, was also self-published by Bautista in 2021. Tatlong Kuwento ng Buhay ni Julian Candelabra (1st prize, Palanca Memorial Awards for Literature, 1983) was translated in English and published by The Lifted Brow in Australia.

On January 5, 2022, Bautista revealed in a Facebook post an offer by Penguin Classics, an imprint of international book publisher Penguin Books, to publish the English version of Dekada '70 as part of their collection of classics. The offer was made by Elda Rotor, vice president and publisher of Penguin Classics. News of the offer led to Bautista being congratulated by fellow writers and literary organizations in the Philippines, including the National Book Development Board, screenwriter Jerry Gracio, poet Merlie Alunan, and Ateneo de Manila University Press director Karina Bolasco.

== Personal life and death ==
On August 11, 2020, Filipino citizen Jefferson Lodia Badong red-tagged Bautista in a Facebook comment, accusing her of being a member of the New People's Army (NPA), an allegation that endangered Bautista's personal safety. Bautista, on her Facebook wall, posted a screenshot of Badong's comment. The post trended and commenters admonished Badong for red-tagging, an act that endangers its target and is used to curtail free speech. Badong wrote a public apology and made his account private. Badong deleted the apology minutes after posting it. In another post, Bautista threatened to sue Badong for cyberlibel along with a screenshot of his profile. Bautista later said that she is not proceeding with the case as Badong has sent her a private apology, which Bautista posted. In the aftermath, Badong has deactivated his account after he was continually shamed by supporters and friends of Bautista.

Bautista died at her home on February 12, 2023, at the age of 77.

== Works ==
=== Books ===
- Bulaklak sa City Jail
- Dekada '70
- Bata, Bata… Pa'no Ka Ginawa?
- ‘GAPÔ
- Sixty in the City
- In Sisterhood
- Sonata
- Hinugot sa Tadyang (non-fiction)
- Buwan, Buwan, Hulugan Mo Ako ng Sundang: Dalawang Dekada ng Maiikling Kuwento
- Desaparesidos

==== Novelettes ====
- Sila At Ang Gabi: Isang Buong Laot at Kalahati ng Daigdig (1994) ISBN 9712703290
- Ang Babae sa Basag na Salamin (1994) ISBN 9716850328
- Araw ng mga Puso ISBN 971685014X
- Apat Na screenplay ISBN 9712704475
- Ang Kabilang Panig ng Bakod
- Hugot sa Sinapupunan
- Desisyon
- Sumakay tayo sa buwan

=== Screenplays ===
- Sakada (co-writer)
- Kung Mahawi Man ang Ulap
- Bulaklak sa City Jail
- Kadenang Bulaklak
- The Maricris Sioson Story
- Nena
- Bata, Bata...Pa'no Ka Ginawa?: The Screenplay
- Dekada '70
- Gusto Ko Nang Lumigaya (screenplay)
- Sex Object
- Isang Kabanata sa Libro ng Buhay ni Leilani Cruzaldo (television drama)

=== Teleplays ===
- Dear Teacher (co-writer)
- Daga sa Timba ng Tubig
- Mama
- Pira-pirasong Pangarap
- Balintataw (Episode title: "Labinlimang Taon"; 1987)
- Desaparesidos (1998)

== Awards and honors ==
Year	Award	Category	Work	Result
1984	Metro Manila Film Festival	Best Story	Bulaklak sa City Jail	Won
1984	Metro Manila Film Festival	Best Screenplay	Bulaklak sa City Jail	Won

== See also ==
- Edgardo M. Reyes
- Manuel Buising
- Paz Márquez-Benítez
