= Dawn (disambiguation) =

Dawn is the time that marks the beginning of the twilight before sunrise.

Dawn commonly refers to:

- Dawn (name), a given name, including a list of people with the name

Dawn may also refer to:

== Places ==
- Dawn, Missouri, an unincorporated community in the US
- Dawn, Ohio, an unincorporated community in the US
- Dawn, Texas, an unincorporated community in the US
- Dawn (PAT station), a station on the Port Authority of Allegheny County's light rail network
- 1618 Dawn, an asteroid
- Dawn Township, Ontario, Canada, today part of Dawn-Euphemia Township

== Organisations ==
- Dawn (Iceland), an Icelandic political organization formed in 2012
- Dawn (Russia), a Russian political party formed in 2024
- Dawn (Slovakia), a Slovak political party formed in 2005
- Dawn – National Coalition, a Czech political party
- Dawn of Nemunas, a populist Lithuaninan political party
- Dawn (Bengali educational society), a society founded in 1902
- Dawn Bible Students Association, an American organization established in 1932
- Dawn Career Institute, a technical school in Wilmington, Delaware, US
- Dawn Equipment Company, a manufacturer of agricultural equipment
- Dawn Foods, an American food manufacturer and distributor
- Development Alternatives with Women for a New Era (DAWN), a transnational network of feminists from the global South
- Democracy for the Arab World Now (DAWN), a Washington-based Middle East human rights and democracy advocacy non-profit
- Drug Abuse Warning Network (DAWN), a US government program to collect statistics on emergency room mentions of drugs

== Products ==
- Dawn (brand), a dishwashing detergent by Procter & Gamble
- Dawn doll, a fashion doll by Topper between 1970 and 1973

== Vehicles ==
- Akatsuki (spacecraft) or Dawn, a former Japanese spacecraft launched in 2010 to Venus
- Dawn (spacecraft), a space orbiter launched in 2007 to Vesta and Ceres
- USS Dawn (1857), a steamer
- USS Dawn (SP-26), a repair boat in commission from 1917 to 1918
- USS Dawn (SP-37), a proposed private yawl ordered delivered to the Navy in 1917, but never commissioned into Navy service
- USS Dawn (IX-186), a tanker in commission from 1944 to 1946
- Rolls-Royce Dawn, a handmade 2+2 convertible luxury grand tourer automobile

== Art ==
- Dawn (Journeay), a 1931 bronze sculpture by Helen Journeay
- Dawn (Michelangelo), a marble sculpture in Florence, Italy
- Dawn (painting), 1989, by Odd Nerdrum

== Books and publications ==
=== Books ===
- Dawn, the Al-Falaq invocation, the 113th Sura of the Qur'an
- Dawn (Andrews novel), 1990, by V. C. Andrews and Andrew Neiderman
- Dawn (McLaughlin novel), 1980, by Dean McLaughlin
- Dawn (Haggard novel), 1884, by H. Rider Haggard
- Dawn (Warriors), 2006 novel in the Warriors: The New Prophecy series by Erin Hunter
- Dawn (Wiesel novel), a 1961 short novel by Elie Wiesel
- Dawn (Wright novel), 1929, by S. Fowler Wright
- Dawn (Demirtaş book), a 2017 short story collection by Selahattin Demirtaş
- Dawn (comics), a comic book series and the title character
- Dawn, a novel by Octavia E. Butler, part of the Xenogenesis Trilogy
- Dawn, a novel by Kevin Brooks

=== Magazines and newspapers ===
- Dawn Media Group, a Pakistani media company
  - Dawn (newspaper), a Pakistan English-language newspaper
  - Dawn News, an English-language news channel in Pakistan
- Dawn (Indian educationalist magazine), a magazine published between 1897 and 1912
- Dawn (magazine) (1952–1968), New South Wales magazine for Australian Aboriginals
- The Dawn (feminist magazine) (1885–1905), Australian literary journal
- The Dawn (feminist newsletter) (1919–1967), non-party political journal published in Western Australia
- The Dawn (magazine), a periodical by the Dawn Bible Students Association

== Film and television ==
- Dawn (1919 film), adapted from the Eleanor Porter story of the same name
- Dawn (1928 film), a British silent film
- Dawn (1929 film), a German silent film
- The Dawn (film) (1936), an Irish film
- Dawn: Portrait of a Teenage Runaway, a 1976 American made-for-television movie
- Dawn!, a 1979 biopic of Dawn Fraser
- Dawn (1985 film), a Franco-Hungarian film
- Dawn (2014 film), a Swiss film
- Dawn (2015 film), a Latvian film
- "Dawn" (Star Trek: Enterprise), an episode of Star Trek: Enterprise
- Dawn, a documentary series presented by Dawn Porter
- Dawn, an anime character in Pokémon

== Music ==
=== Albums ===
- Dawn (Aimer album), 2015
- Dawn (Current 93 album), 1987
- Dawn (Danger Danger album), 1995
- Dawn (Dawn Robinson album), 2002
- Dawn (Eloy album), 1976
- Dawn (Gary Numan album) or Sacrifice, 1994
- Dawn (Guitar Vader album), 2003
- Dawn (Mxmtoon EP), 2020
- Dawn (Mount Eerie album), 2008
- Dawn (Rebecca St. James EP), 2020
- Dawn (Yebba album), 2021
- The Dawn (album), by The Dawn, 1986

=== Classical ===
- "Dawn", also known as "Sunrise", the introduction to Also sprach Zarathustra by Richard Strauss

=== Songs ===
- "Dawn (Go Away)", a 1964 song by The Four Seasons
- "Dawn", a 1996 song by Stabbing Westward from Wither Blister Burn & Peel
- "Dawn", a 2001 song by Bif Naked from Purge (album)
- "Dawn: Dawn Is a Feeling", a 1967 song by The Moody Blues from Days of Future Passed
- "The Dawn", a 2002 composition by Finnish power metal band Dreamtale from Beyond Reality
- "Dawn" (LiSA song), 2021, by LiSA
- "Dawns" (song), 2023, by Zach Bryan featuring Maggie Rogers

=== Performers and labels ===
- Dawn Records, a 1970s British record label launched by Pye Records
- Tony Orlando and Dawn (also known as "Dawn"), a pop music group from the 1970s
- Dawn (Swedish band), a Swedish black metal band
- The Dawn (band), a Filipino rock band
- Dawn (rapper), a South Korean rapper and singer

== See also ==
- Hellsing: The Dawn, a prequel of the manga Hellsing
- Madaling Araw ("Dawn"), a 1909 Philippine novel by Iñigo Ed. Regalado
- Operation Dawn (disambiguation), various military operations
- De Vrije Gedachte or The Dawn, a Dutch freethinkers association
