= Rising (Mxmtoon album) =

Studio album by Mxmtoon
- Released: May 20, 2022
- Genres: Indie pop; disco-pop; electropop
- Length: 32:49
- Labels: Self-released; AWAL
- Producers: Mxmtoon; Luke Niccoli; Brandon Shoop; Gabe Simon; Pom Pom

Mxmtoon chronology
Dusk (2020)	Rising (2022)

Singles from Rising
- 1. "Mona Lisa" Released: February 8, 2022; 2. "Sad Disco" Released: March 24, 2022; 3. "Victim of Nostalgia" Released: April 17, 2022; 4. "Coming of Age" Released: May 13, 2022

Rising is the second studio album by American singer-songwriter Mxmtoon, released on May 20, 2022, through AWAL. Rising was promoted by the singles "Mona Lisa", "Sad Disco", "Victim of Nostalgia", and "Coming of Age".

== Background and promotion ==
Since the release of her debut studio album The Masquerade in 2019, Mxmtoon released the twin EPs Dawn and Dusk in 2020, and in 2021 contributed songs to the game Life Is Strange: True Colors. In November 2021, Mxmtoon told Dork that she was working on her second studio album, and aiming to release it in 2022. On January 25, 2022, she posted a snipped of the song "Mona Lisa" on TikTok, along with making the song available for pre-save. "Mona Lisa" was released as the album's lead single on February 8, 2022, alongside the announcement of a 2022 North American tour. Mxmtoon said of the song, "As someone who usually writes songs about other people, one of my ongoing questions is, 'Will anyone ever write songs about me?' Mona Lisa is about wanting to be the subject of the art for once instead of being the creator. I think we all daydream at some point in our lives of diving into our favorite stories and finding ourselves in the pages." The music video for the song dropped on March 3, 2022, along with the hint that a full album might come in Spring 2022.

Mxmtoon released the second single "Sad Disco" on March 24, 2022, and announced that the album's title and release date. Mxmtoon intended the song to be a sort of response to her 2018 breakout single "Prom Dress", saying "in a way, it feels like an answer to the girl who wrote 'prom dress' in the first place. serving as a reminder that she isn't stuck on the floor with tears streaming down her face forever, but that she'll grow up, and the loneliness she sometimes feels won't define her. she can still choose to dance and have her own 'sad disco'".

The third single, "Victim of Nostalgia" was released on April 27, 2022. According to the artist, the song is "about missing the blind optimism and warmth that's so much easier to experience when you're younger. Wanting to escape back into a time when your worries weren't so pervasive." The fourth and final pre-release single "Coming of Age" was released on May 13, 2022. Mxmtoon said the song is about "the growth I've experienced between writing, producing, and personally understanding the individual I know myself to be currently. It's a strange experience having thousands of people watch you grow up and enter your twenties, and it felt necessary to make a song that simultaneously celebrates the uncertainty of self discovery but can find confidence in growth."

== Tour ==
On February 9, 2022, Mxmtoon announced a headlining tour in support of the album, titled "Rising (The World Tour)" (stylized in all lowercase), with legs in North America, the United Kingdom, and Oceania. The tour started on May 2, 2022, in Montreal, Canada, and concluded on October 30, 2022, in Dublin, Ireland. Chloe Moriondo supported the North American leg of the tour.

== Critical reception ==
Professional ratings
Review scores
Source	Rating
AllMusic	2.5/5 stars
DIY	4/5 stars
The Forty-Five	4/5 stars

Alisdair Grice of DIY praised Mxmtoon's relatability as a songwriter, saying "Maia is to indie-pop what Olivia Rodrigo is to pop-punk – a fresh and welcome face that disregards gatekeeping in favour of utilising nostalgia to captivate new audiences, bridging a gap that ignores the omnipotent zeitgeist for confessional, shimmering accessibility". Rhian Daly, writing for The Forty-Five, called it "a collection that gently encourages you to find light and joy again in the simplest, smallest ways." The Guardian's Kate Hutchinson praised the album's sharp songwriting which she felt would appeal to fans of Phoebe Bridgers.

== Track listing ==
Rising track listing
No.	Title	Writer(s)	Producer(s)	Length
1.	"Mona Lisa"	Mxmtoon; Pom Pom; Rosie	Pom Pom; Luke Niccoli	3:10
2.	"Learn to Love You"	Mxmtoon; Micah Premnath; Luke Niccoli	Niccoli	2:12
3.	"Victim of Nostalgia"	Mxmtoon; Premnath; Niccoli	Niccoli	2:36
4.	"Sad Disco"	Mxmtoon; Gabe Simon	Niccoli; Simon	3:03
5.	"Frown"	Mxmtoon; Ross Copperman; Niccoli	Niccoli	2:19
6.	"Florida"	Mxmtoon; Brandon Shoop	Niccoli; Shoop	2:47
7.	"Scales"	Mxmtoon; Niccoli	Mxmtoon; Niccoli	2:39
8.	"Growing Pains"	Mxmtoon; Niccoli; Jesse Fink; Shoop	Niccoli; Shoop	2:42
9.	"Dizzy"	Mxmtoon; Niccoli	Niccoli	2:54
10.	"Haze"	Mxmtoon; Niccoli	Niccoli	3:11
11.	"Dance (End of the World)"	Mxmtoon; Premnath; Niccoli	Niccoli	2:38
12.	"Coming of Age"	Mxmtoon; Niccoli; Pom Pom; Fink	Niccoli; Pom Pom	2:38
Total length:				32:49
