= Ang Huling Pagluha =

1926 Tagalog novel by Iñigo Ed. Regalado

- Author: Iñigo Ed. Regalado
- Language: Tagalog
- Genre: Novel
- Publisher: Limbagan Ilagan at Sanga
- Publication date: 1926
- Publication place: Philippines
- Media type: Print
- Pages: 283
- Preceded by: May Pagsinta'y Walang Puso
- Followed by: Ang Anak ng Dumalaga

Ang Huling Pagluha ("The Final Shedding of Tears") was the first novel of Filipino novelist Iñigo Ed. Regalado that appeared on the pages of the Tagalog-language magazine Liwayway. It began as a serial novel in Liwayway on 30 June 1926. The 283-page book version was published in 1933 in Manila, Philippines by the Bahay Aklatan "Ang Pagsilang" (Library House "The Birth") during the American era in Philippine history (1898–1946). Ang Huling Pagluha was one of the novels Regalado had written during the Golden Age of the Tagalog Novel (1905–1935).

== Description ==
Regalado's Ang Huling Pagluha is a love story and a romance novel set in the socio-political context in the Philippines during the time. According to literary critic Soledad Reyes, the socio-political context was deliberately blurred by the author, and that the attention in the narrative was angled to concentrate on the "ebb and flow" of the love affair. The main characters of the novel were the couple named Berto and Florandi. The romance began with love at first sight, then proceeded to the profession of endless love, and continued to the formalization of the relationship. The obstacles in the love story of Berto and Florandi included the opinions of other people about them. The hearsays included the allegation that Florandi was about the status of her virginity. Based on traditional Filipino culture and values, the loss of virginity before marriage is unacceptable, particularly to the male lover. The rumor about Florandi's virginity ruined the relationship. Florandi suffered emotionally and died. Berto grieved at Florandi's funeral.

== See also ==
- Luha ng Babae
- Luha ng Buwaya
