= Luha ng Babae =

1913 novel by Mamerto A. Hilario

- Author: Mamerto A. Hilario
- Cover artist: Limbagang Magiting Ni Honorio Lopez
- Language: Tagalog
- Genre: Novel
- Publication date: 1913
- Publication place: Philippines
- Media type: Print
- Pages: 121

Luha ng Babae ("Tear[s] of [a] Woman") is a 1913 Tagalog-language novel written by Filipino novelist Mamerto A. Hilario. The 121-page book was published by the Limbagang Magiting Ni Honorio Lopez (Heroic Press of Honorio Lopez) in Manila, Philippines during the American period in Philippine history. The 1913 edition of the book has a foreword written by Pascual de Leon.

== Description ==
Luha ng Babae narrates the "boundless" and "endless" sufferings, sorrows, and sacrifices made by a young Filipino woman named Luisa. She became a martyr for love and for a man named Victor. Victor was Luisa's "first and only love", despite Victor's reputation as a gambler and a womanizer.

== Plot ==
Luisa agreed to elope with Victor despite the objections of her parents. Afterwards, Victor's real character was revealed to Luisa. Victor was an irresponsible man and husband. Victor was imprisoned for committing adultery. Victor suspected and accused Luisa of being a betrayer, thinking that she was having an extramarital affair with another man. Luisa denied the accusation. Luisa gave birth to Victor's child. Victor died during a boat ride. Luisa died while in disconsolation and pain. While dying, Luisa left her child with her parents. Luisa asked forgiveness from her mother and father for her mistake.

== See also ==
- Luha ng Buwaya
- Ang Huling Pagluha
