= Amado V. Hernandez =

Filipino writer and labor leader

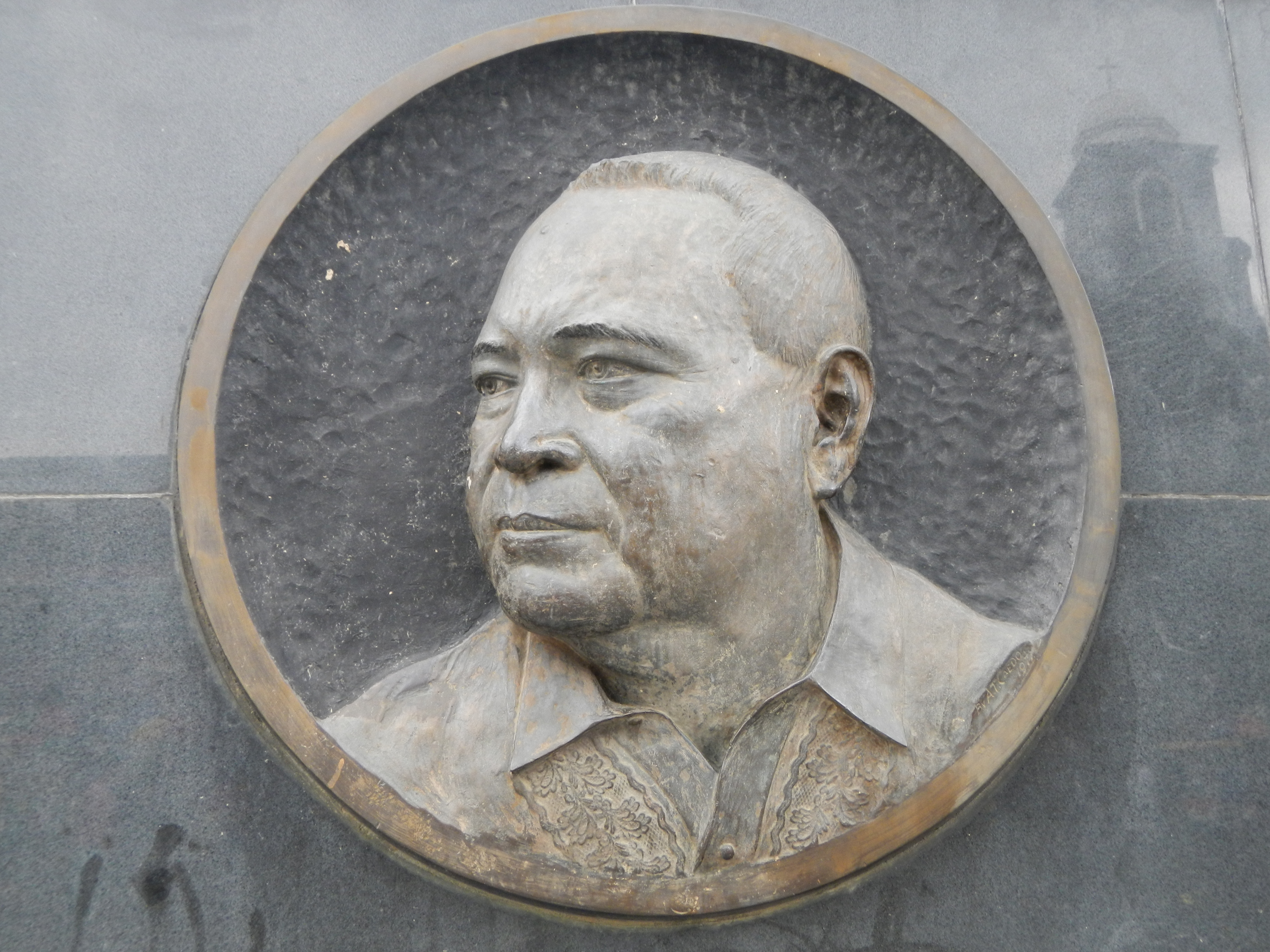
- Relief bust of Amado V. Hernandez, Plaza Hernandez, Tondo, Manila.

Member of the Manila Municipal Board
- In office 1945–1951

Personal details
- Born: Amado Vera Hernandez; September 13, 1903 Tondo, Manila, Philippine Islands
- Died: March 24, 1970 (aged 66) Manila, Philippines
- Spouse: Atang de la Rama (m. 1932)
- Awards: Order of National Artists of the Philippines

Amado Vera Hernandez (September 13, 1903 – March 24, 1970) was a Filipino writer and labor leader who was known for his criticism of social injustices in the Philippines and was later imprisoned for his involvement in the communist movement. He was the central figure in a landmark legal case that took 13 years to settle.

He was born in Tondo, Manila, to parents Juan Hernandez from Hagonoy, Bulacan and Clara Vera of Baliuag, Bulacan. He grew up and studied at the Gagalangin, Tondo, the Manila High School and at the American Correspondence School.

== Career as a Writer ==
While still a teenager, he began writing in Tagalog for the newspaper Watawat (Flag). He would later write a column for the Tagalog publication Pagkakaisa (Unity) and become the youngest patnugot (editor) of Mabuhay (Long Live) at the age of 28.

His writings gained the attention of Tagalog literati and some of his stories and poems were included in anthologies, such as Clodualdo del Mundo's Parolang Ginto and Alejandro Abadilla's Talaang Bughaw.

In 1922, at the age of 19, Hernandez became a member of the literary society Aklatang Bayan which included noted Tagalog writers Lope K. Santos and Jose Corazon de Jesus.

In 1932, he married the Filipino actress Atang de la Rama. Both of them would later be recognized as National Artists: Hernandez for literature and de la Rama for theater and music.

== World War II ==
Hernandez joined the resistance movement when the Japanese invaded in the Philippines in 1941. He was an intelligence operative of the guerilla outfit of Marking and Anderson, whose operations covered Bulacan and the Sierra Madre mountains, throughout the Second World War.

While he was a guerilla, Hernandez came in contact with guerillas of the Hukbo ng Bayan Laban sa Hapon (Hukbalahap) which was founded by Luis Taruc and other communist ideologues continued by the Philippine Commonwealth troops entered in Bulacan. It is believed that this was when Hernandez developed sympathies, if not belief, with the communist movement.

== Labor leader ==
After the war, President Sergio Osmeña appointed him councilor of Manila during the reconstruction of the war-devastated city. He also became president of the defunct Philippine Newspaper Guild in coordination with its editor in chief, Narjeey Larasa. During this time he published articles on landlordism, collaboration with the Japanese, the reintroduction of American armed forces and the execution of guerilla leaders.

But his most significant activities after the war involved organizing labor unions across the country through the labor federation Congress of Labor Organizations (CLO). Influenced by the philosophy of Marx he advocated revolution as a means of change. On May 5, 1947, he led the biggest labor strike to hit Manila at that time. The following year, he became president of the CLO and led another massive labor demonstration in May 1948.

In 1950, the Philippine military started a crackdown against the communist movement, which had sparked open rebellion in some areas on Luzon island, and the CLO headquarters was raided on January 20, 1951. Hernandez was arrested in January 1951 along with several trade union leaders in Manila on the suspicion that he was among the leaders of the rebellion.

== Imprisonment ==
Though the authorities could not find evidence to charge him; For six months, he was transferred from one military camp to another and it took nearly a year before he was indicted on a charge of rebellion with murder, arson and robbery - a complex crime unheard of in Philippine legal history.

The case stirred the interest of civil rights activists in the Philippines and Hernandez was assisted at various times by legal luminaries like Senator Claro M. Recto, former President José P. Laurel and Claudio Teehankee, who would later become Chief Justice of the Supreme Court of the Philippines. But he remained in prison while his appeal was pending.

It was while he was imprisoned that he wrote his most notable works. He wrote Isang Dipang Langit (A Stretch of Heaven), which later won a Republic Cultural Heritage Award, and Bayang Malaya (Free Nation), which later won a Balagtas Award. Also written in prison was his masterpiece Luha ng Buwaya (Tears of the Crocodile). Portions of his novel Mga Ibong Mandaragit (Birds of Prey) was also written while he was at the New Bilibid Prison. He also edited the prison's newspaper Muntinglupa Courier.

After five years of imprisonment, the Supreme Court allowed Hernandez to post bail on June 20, 1956. He then resumed his journalistic career and wrote a column for the Tagalog tabloid Taliba. He would later be conferred awards in prestigious literary contests, like the Commonwealth Literary Contest (twice), Don Carlos Palanca Memorial Awards (four times) and journalism awards given by the National Press Club of the Philippines (four times).

On May 30, 1964, the Supreme Court acquitted Hernandez in a decision that would be a landmark in Philippine jurisprudence. The case People of the Philippines vs. Amado V. Hernandez is now a standard case study in Philippine law schools.

Hernandez continued to write and teach after his acquittal. He was teaching at the University of the Philippines when he died on March 24, 1970. The University of the Philippines posthumously conferred on him the degree of Doctor of Humanities honoris causa on March 14, 1972. The Ateneo de Manila University awarded him its first Tanglaw ng Lahi award. He was posthumously conferred as National Artist for Literature in 1973. Together with poet José García Villa, Hernández was the first to receive the title in literature.

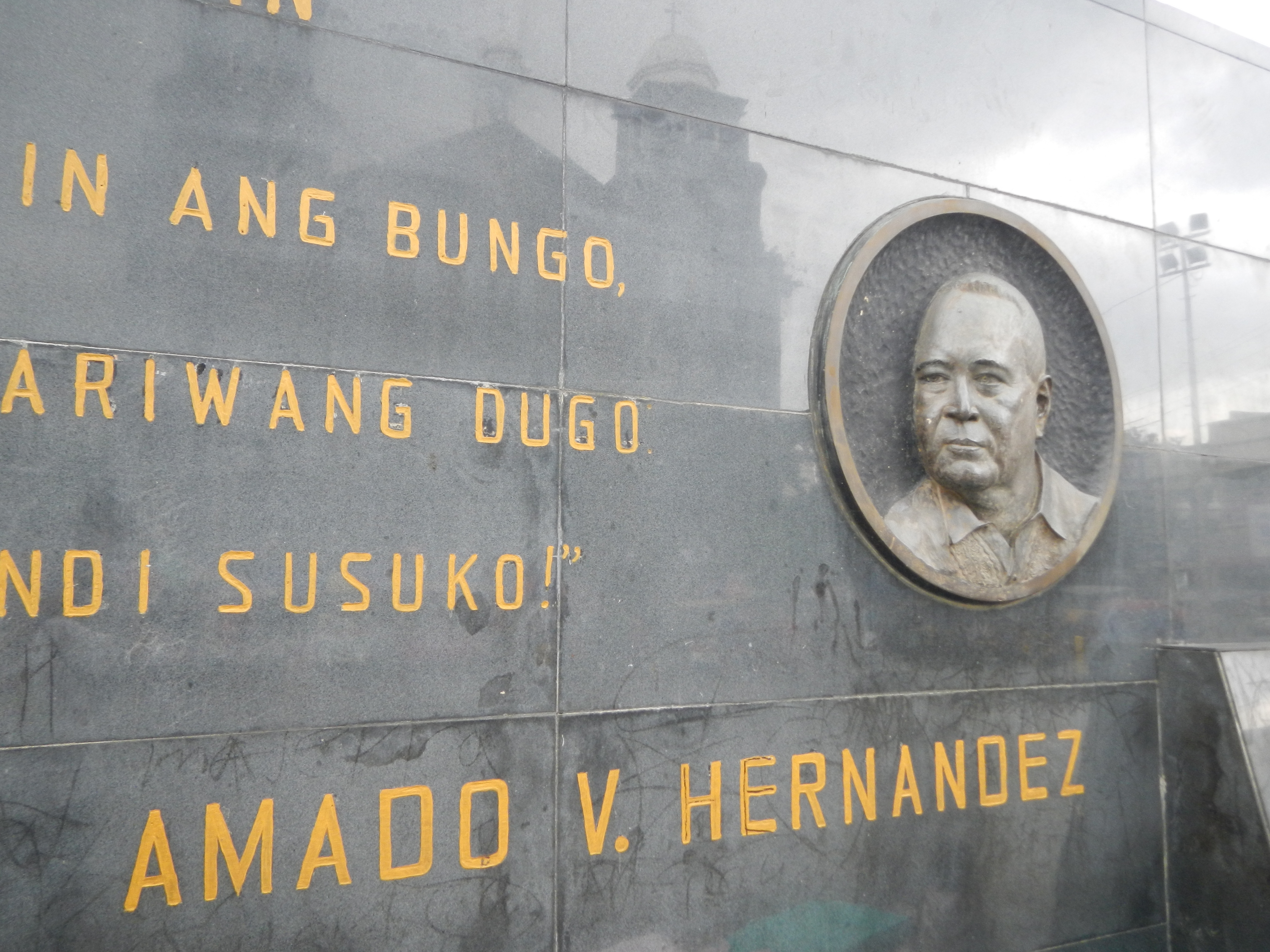
Amado V. Hernandez Monument-Memorial (Tondo, Manila)

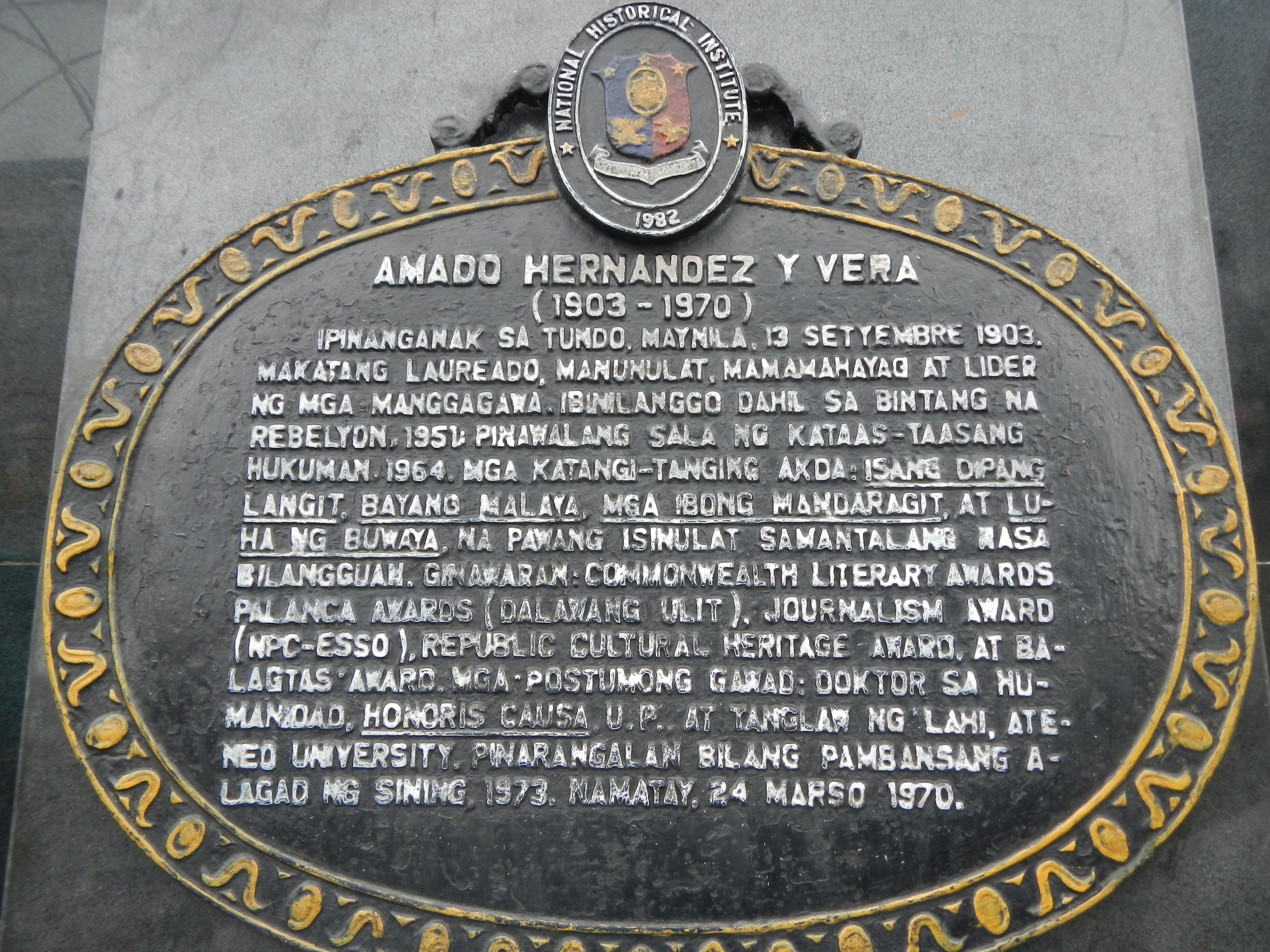
NHI Marker (in front of Santo Niño de Tondo Parish)

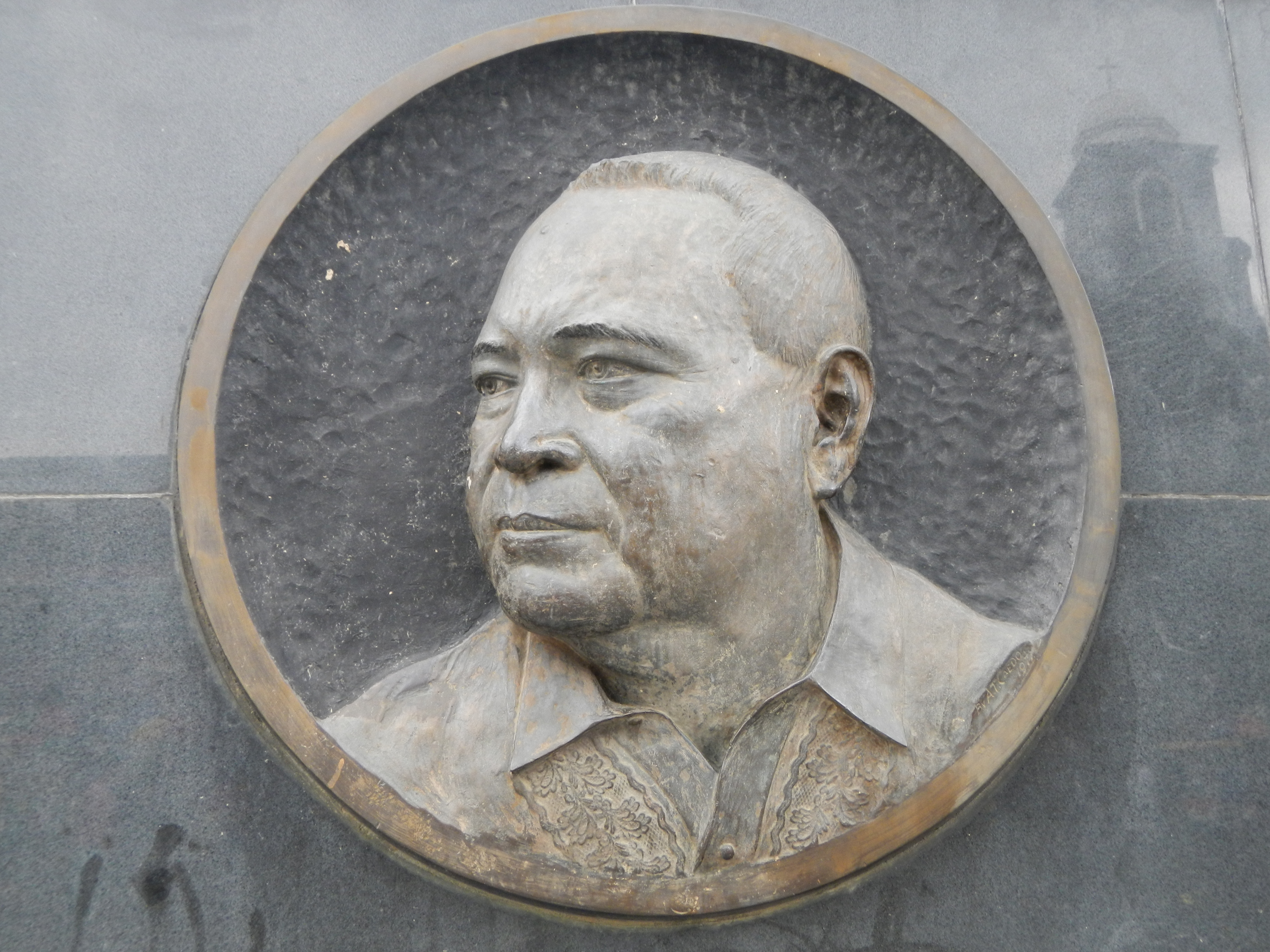
Sculpture of Hernandez

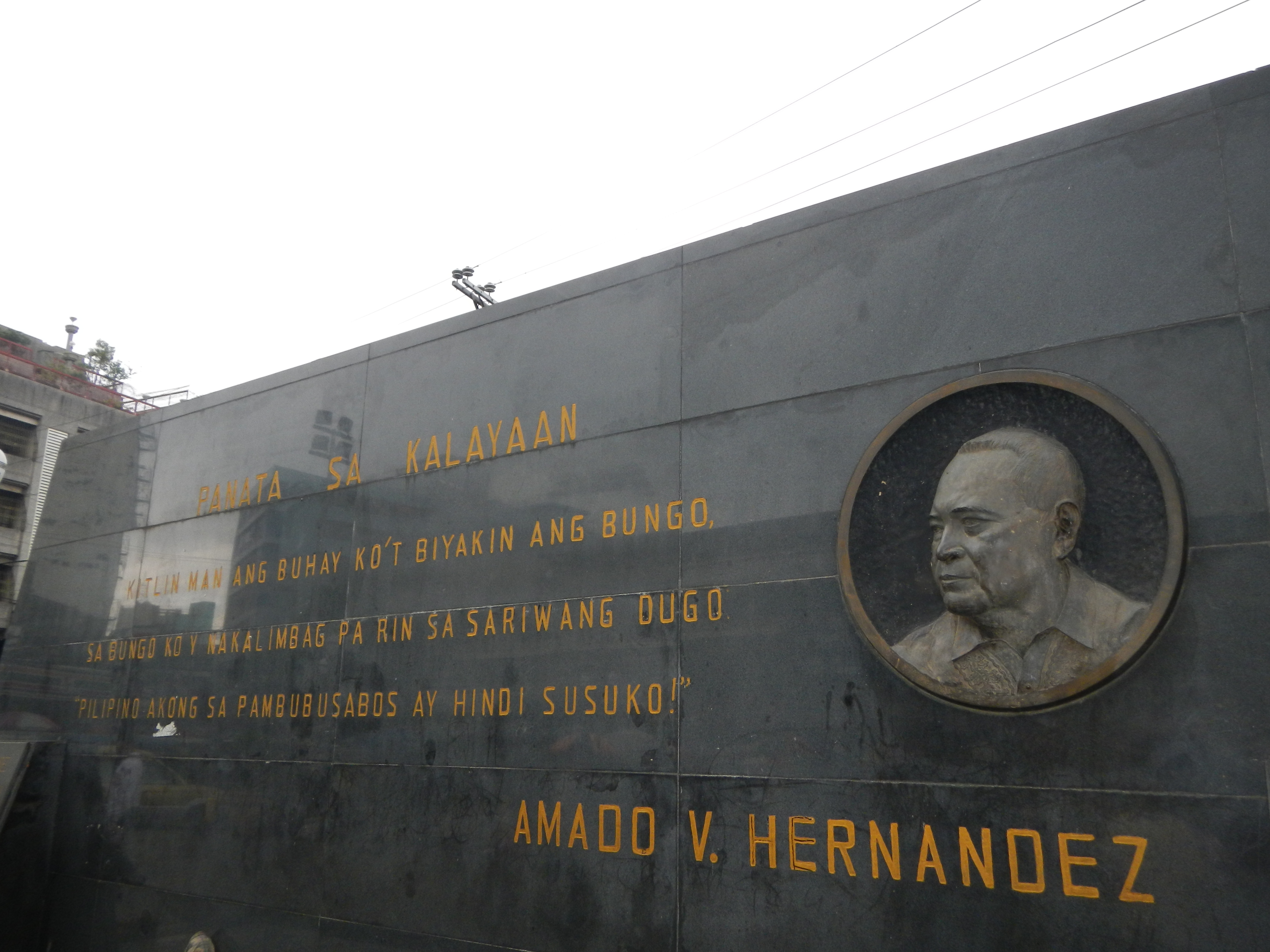
Facade

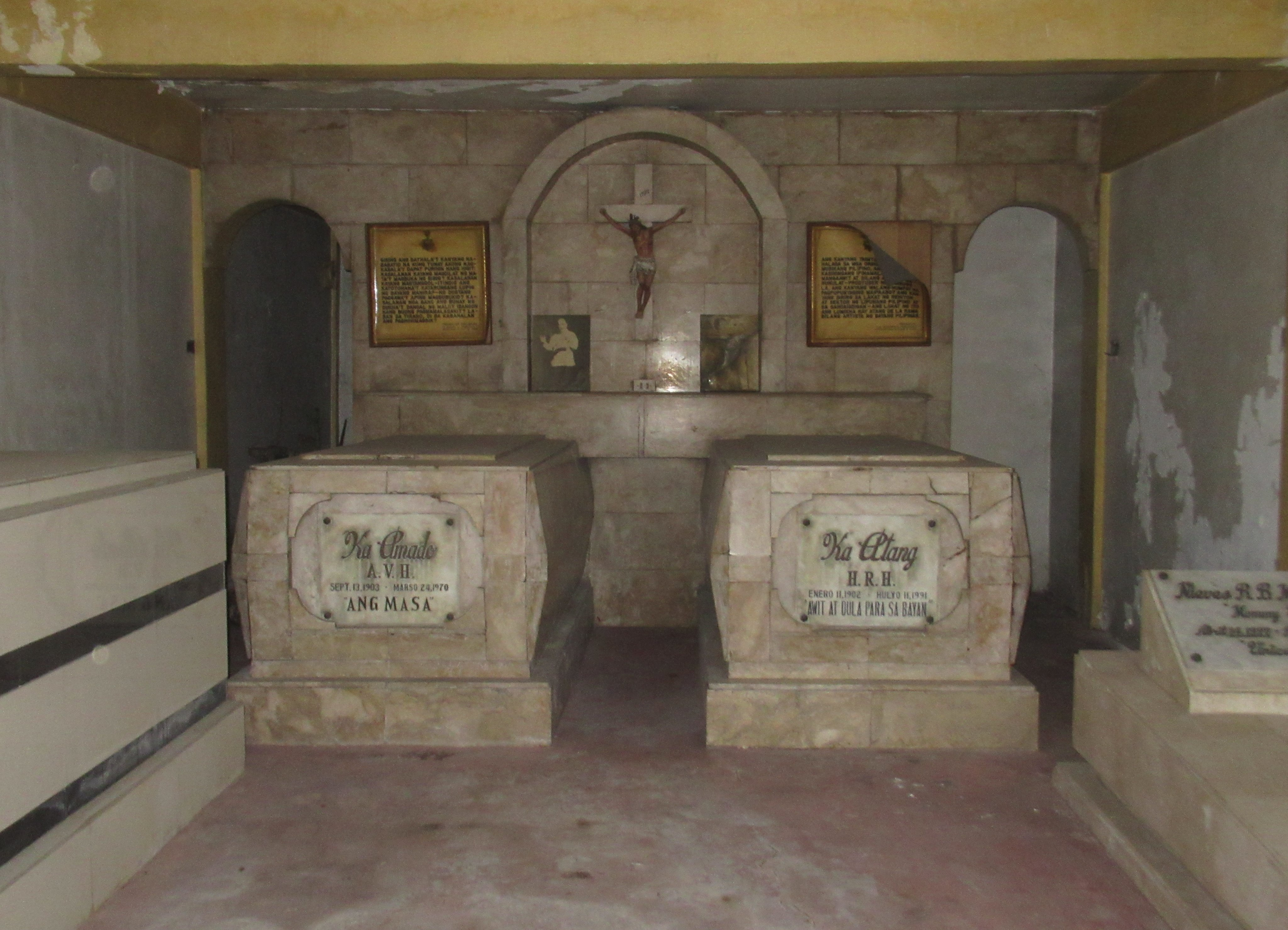
Hernandez's & de la Rama's graves at their mausoleum (Manila North Cemetery)

== Works ==
=== Novels ===
His socio-political novels were based on his experiences as a guerrilla, as a labour leader and as a political detainee.

- Mga Ibong Mandaragit (Birds of Prey),1969.
- Luha Ng Buwaya (Crocodile's Tears), 1972.
- Pili sa Pinili (Chosen from the Selected), 1964.

=== Poems ===
- Isang Dipang Langit (An Arm-Stretch of Sky),
- Panata sa Kalayaan (Pledge to Freedom) - this poem is carved on his marble headstone April 22, 1952
- Ang Mga Kayamanan ng Tao
- Ang Dalaw Kay Silaw
- Bartolina
- Kung Tuyo Na ang Luha Mo Aking Bayan (When Your Tears Have Dried, My Country)
- Bayang Malaya
- Ang Taong Kapos
- Bayani
- Sa Batang Walang Bagong Damit
- Isang Sining ng Pagbigkas
- Ang Panday
- Inang Wika
- Ang Tao
- Ang Aklasan

=== Essays ===
- Si Atang at ang Dulaan (Atang and the Theater)
- Si Jose Corazon de Jesus at ang Ating Panulaan (Jose Corazon de Jesus and Our Poetry)

== Awards and nominations ==
Awards and nominations
Year	Award giving body	Category	Nominated work	Results
1925		Makata ng Ilaw at Panitik		Won
1938	Commonwealth Literary Contest		Kayumanggi	Won
1958	1958 Palanca Awards	One-Act Play in Filipino	Muntinlupa	Won
1959	1959 Palanca Awards	One-Act Play in Filipino	Hagdan sa Bahaghari	Won
1962	Republic Cultural Heritage Award		Isang Dipang Langit	Won
1964	City of Manila	Patnubay ng Sining at Kalinangan ng Lungsod Maynila		Won
1970	Ateneo de Manila University	Tanglaw ng Lahi		Won

== Sources ==
- National Historical Institute, Filipinos in History 5 vols. (Manila: National Historical Institute, 1995)
- Amado V. Hernandez
