= OND =

OND may refer to:

- Oblates of Notre Dame, a congregation of religious sisters originating in Mindanao, Philippines
- Önd, an Old Norse term used to denote the mystical Odic force
- One Note Database, an IBM Lotus Notes file
- Opera Nazionale Dopolavoro, the leisure and recreational body of the Fascist Italy government
- Ordinary National Diploma, former designation of BTEC Extended Diploma, a vocational qualification in the United Kingdom
- Operation New Dawn (disambiguation), the operative name for the Iraq War after August 2010, or one of several other military operations
- Tironian Et, a letter that is sometimes called ond.
- October, November, December, a 3-month season period
