= Sampagitang Walang Bango =

1921 book by Iñigo Ed. Regalado

- Author: Iñigo Ed. Regalado
- Language: Tagalog
- Genre: Novel
- Publisher: P. Sayo
- Publication date: 1921
- Publication place: Philippines
- Media type: Print
- Pages: 271
- Preceded by: Ang Labing-apat na Awa
- Followed by: May Pagsinta'y Walang Puso

Sampagitang Walang Amoy ("Jasmine Without Fragrance"), also rendered as Sampaguitang Walang Bango, was a 1921 Tagalog-language novel written by notable Filipino novelist Iñigo Ed. Regalado. The theme of the novel revolves around love, romance, treachery, and endurance. In the novel, Regalado depicted the City of Manila during the American occupation of the Philippines but before World War II. Sampagitang Walang Bango was one of the novels Regalado had written during the Golden Age of the Tagalog Novel (1905–1935).

== Plot ==
Set during the second decade of American occupation and colonization of the Philippines, Regalado invented in Sampagitang Walang Bango the characters Bandino, Nenita, Pakito, and Liling. Bandino was the playboy husband of Nenita. The alienated Nenita, weakened and rebelling against Bandino's indecencies, succumbed to an extramarital affair with Pakito, a lawyer. Pakito was a man engaged to be married to Liling, a modest and demure woman. After discovering Nenita's affair with Pakito, Bandino tried to commit suicide. Only Bandino's daughter was able to stop him from shooting himself. Bandino, with his daughter, left the Philippines. Nenita, already abandoned by her husband, was also left by Pakito to fend for herself.

== Description ==
Sampagitang Walang Bango was published in Manila by P. Sayo. Apart from being a narrative about infidelity, particularly in the so-called wealthy and high-class people of Manila, the 271-page novel described a Philippine society when its traditional Filipino values were being tarnished and windswept by the norms and lifestyles from the Western world. Sampagitang Walang Bango was written by Regalado during a time when the "highly westernized middle and upper classes" of Filipinos were beginning to appear and establish themselves in Philippine society. According to literary critic Soledad Reyes, Sampagitang Walang Bango presented scenes depicting the lifestyle of wealthy Filipinos during the "second decade of American rule" and the "deepening American colonization" of the Philippines. Examples are the Manila Carnival (a yearly "Mardi Gras" before the onset of Easter held in the Philippines from 1908–1939, with a series of nine balls (formal dance parties) that were presided over by the queen of the carnival), lavish parties, outings during the weekends, and the fashion trends of the times. The mixed themes of "love, self-control, and infidelity" were portrayed by the author as events that happened within a "carnival-like milieu". The 2001 edition of the novel was published by the Ateneo de Manila University Press, and was edited with an introduction written by literary critic Roberto T. Añonuevo. A variation of Sampagitang Walang Bango is Regalado's Anak ng Dumalaga (Child of the Pullet).

== Film adaptation ==
Sampagitang Walang Bango was adapted into a film in 1937. The film version was directed by Fermín Barva for Filippine Films and starred Leopoldo Salcedo and Angelita "Rhumba" Rey.

== See also ==
- May Pagsinta'y Walang Puso
