= New Dawn =

New Dawn may refer to:

== Entertainment ==
- "A New Dawn" (Drop the Dead Donkey), a 1990 television episode
- "New Dawn", a 1999 song by Linda Perry, covered by Celine Dion in 2007 on Taking Chances
- New Dawn (film), a 1999 French film
- A New Dawn, a 2003 science fiction short story collection by Robert Campbell
- MS Saga: A New Dawn, a 2005 video game
- New Dawn (album), a 2008 album by Libera
- "New Dawn", a 2009 song by Withered Hand from Good News
- Star Wars: A New Dawn, a 2014 novel by John Jackson Miller
- Civilization: A New Dawn, a 2017 strategy board game
- Far Cry New Dawn, a 2019 video game
- A New Dawn (film), a 2026 Japanese animated drama film

== Newspapers and magazines ==
- Fiji Focus or New Dawn, a Fiji bi-monthly newspaper
- The New Dawn, a Liberian newspaper
- Yeni Şafak ("New Dawn"), a conservative Turkish daily newspaper
- New Dawn, an Australian magazine previously published under the title Dawn (magazine)

== Others ==
- Intelsat 28, formerly New Dawn, a communications satellite
- New Dawn (Algeria), a nationalist and conservative political party formed in 2012
- A New Dawn in the Negev, a Bedouin-Jewish NGO based in Rahat, Israel

== See also ==
- Operation New Dawn (disambiguation)
- Navodaya (disambiguation), "New Dawn" in Indian languages
