= Dusk (Mxmtoon EP) =

EP by Mxmtoon
- Released: October 1, 2020
- Genre: Folk-pop
- Length: 22:48
- Label: Self-released; AWAL
- Producer: Ian Fitchuk; Merrill Garbus; HOWARD; Pom Pom; Gabe Simon

Mxmtoon chronology
Dawn (2020)	Dusk (2020)	Rising (2022)

Singles from Dusk
- 1. "Bon Iver" Released: July 30, 2020; 2. "OK On Your Own" Released: September 9, 2020

Dusk is the third extended play by American musician Mxmtoon. The EP was self-released by the artist (and distributed by AWAL) on October 1, 2020 and is the sequel to her earlier EP Dawn. It was promoted by the singles "Bon Iver" and "OK On Your Own", the latter featuring Canadian pop singer Carly Rae Jepsen. The EPs were originally going to be promoted through the Dusk & Dawn tour across North America in summer 2020, though due to the COVID-19 pandemic that did not occur.

== Critical reception ==
Professional ratings
Review scores
Source	Rating
DIY	4/5 stars
Dork	5/5 stars

Dusk sees Mxmtoon return to the simpler folk sound of her debut The Masquerade, after Dawn's detour into straightforward pop. Jamie MacMilan of Dork said that Dusk "feels instead like a warm hug" in the face of the COVID-19 lockdown which inspired many of its songs.

== Track listing ==
No.	Title	Writer(s)	Producer(s)	Length
1.	"Bon Iver"	Amy Wadge; Gabe Simon; MAIA	Gabe Simon	3:16
2.	"OK On Your Own" (featuring Carly Rae Jepsen)	Carly Rae Jepsen; Kellen Pomeranz; MAIA	Pom Pom	3:28
3.	"Myrtle Ave."	Howard Feibusch; MAIA; Sonya Diane Kitchell	Howard	2:48
4.	"Wallflower"	Simon; MAIA	Simon	3:21
5.	"Asking for a Friend"	Ian Fitchuk; MAIA; Merrill Garbus	Fitchuk; Garbus	3:19
6.	"Show and Tell"	Maia	Garbus	4:09
7.	"First"	Maia	Garbus	2:27
Total length:				22:48
