= Prom Dress (song) =

2019 single by Mxmtoon

Single by Mxmtoon

from the album The Masquerade
- Released: May 7, 2019
- Genre: Indie pop
- Length: 3:17
- Label: Self-released
- Songwriter: Maia
- Producers: Mxmtoon; Cavetown

Mxmtoon singles chronology
"My Way" (2019)	"Prom Dress" (2019)	"High & Dry" (2019)

Music video
- "Prom Dress" on YouTube

"Prom Dress" is a song by American singer-songwriter Mxmtoon, released on May 7, 2019 as the lead single from her debut studio album The Masquerade (2019). Produced by Mxmtoon and Cavetown, it went viral on the video-sharing app TikTok and became her breakout hit.

== Background ==
The song was based on Mxmtoon's experience with her high school prom. After having dinner with her family at In-N-Out Burger, where she ate a Double-Double burger, she decided to try on her prom dress. When she did not fit in the dress as she expected, she had a panic attack, collapsing on the ground and tearing up. Her mother walked in and asked if she was OK. Mxmtoon felt ugly and thought the prom would be a "disaster". She dealt with emotional situations by talking about it on Twitter to her followers, and tweeted about crying in a prom dress. This inspired her to write the song, which was finished a year later.

Mxmtoon worked remotely with Cavetown on the song from her home in the San Francisco Bay Area. Following its release, the song achieved widespread popularity on TikTok, helping her rise to fame.

== Content ==
In the song, Mxmtoon deals with her loneliness, disappointment and social anxiety as a teenager. The story finds her going to prom in her best dress, before realizing that her high expectations will not be fulfilled and crying.

== Certifications ==
Region	Certification	Certified units/sales
United Kingdom (BPI)	Silver	200,000^{‡}
United States (RIAA)	Platinum	1,000,000^{‡}
^{‡} Sales+streaming figures based on certification alone.
