= Operation New Dawn =

Operation New Dawn may refer to:

- Operation New Dawn (Iraq, 2010–2011), the United States Armed Forces' involvement in the Iraq War after August 2010
- Operation New Dawn (Afghanistan), an operation in Trekh Nawa in the summer of 2010
- Second Battle of Fallujah, also known as Operation Al-Fajr (The Dawn), a 2004 joint U.S.-Iraqi offensive against the insurgent stronghold of Fallujah during the Iraq War

== See also ==
- New Dawn (disambiguation)
- Operation Dawn (disambiguation)
