= May Pagsinta'y Walang Puso =

1921 novel by Iñigo Ed. Regalado

- Author: Iñigo Ed. Regalado
- Language: Tagalog
- Genre: Novel
- Publication date: 1921
- Publication place: Philippines
- Media type: Print
- Preceded by: Sampagitang Walang Bango
- Followed by: Ang Huling Pagluha

May Pagsinta'y Walang Puso (Heartless Love) was a 1921 Tagalog-language novel written by renowned Filipino poet, journalist, and novelist Iñigo Ed. Regalado. A story of romance, the novel revolves around love, marriage, adultery, unfaithfulness, treachery, hatred, disowning, and forgiveness. May Pagsinta'y Walang Puso was one of the novels Regalado had written during the Golden Age of the Tagalog Novel (1905-1935).

== Description ==
May Pasginta'y Walang Puso was first published in 1921. After obtaining permission from Eriberto Regalado, a relative of Iñigo Ed Regalado, the novel was republished by the Ateneo de Manila University Press in 2001. The novel exposed the historical ambience of the Philippines

== Plot ==
The novel is composed of three parts. The first part tackles the budding relationship between Sela and Fidel. However, Fidel did not marry Sela. The second part narrated Sela’s suffering caused by Fidel's unfaithfulness. Sela found a new lover in Rufo. The last part shows how Sela was haunted by her past, a past that also became her source of happiness. Apart from Sela, Fidel, and Rufo, the other characters were Rafael and Marya.

== Language ==
A novel belonging to The Golden Age of the Tagalog Novel (1905-1921), the language used by Iñigo Ed Regalado was described by Roberto T. Añonuevo as a Tagalog-language that challenges the reader to study the language and the history of the Philippines, particularly in Tagalog literature. Regalado wrote the novel when adultery was a sensitive topic in Philippine literature, thus he used language that was not obvious or vulgar, although may still be considered by Philippine society of the time as "controversial and dense in content". Regalado tamed his language by using words and descriptions that were metaphorical, parable-like, and allegorical, particularly those that are pertaining to women.

== See also ==
- Satanas sa Lupa
