= Operation Dawn =

Operation Dawn may refer to:

- Operation Dawn (1967), a planned Egyptian offensive against Israel
- Operation Dawn (1983) (Operation Dawn 1), an Iranian offensive in the Iran–Iraq War on 10 April 1983
- Operation Dawn 2, an Iranian offensive in the Iran–Iraq War on 22 July 1983
- Operation Dawn (1997), a Turkish Armed Forces operation in northern Iraq against the Kurdistan Workers Party
- Second Battle of Fallujah also known as Operation Al-Fajr (The Dawn) (2004), joint US-Iraqi offensive against the insurgent stronghold of Fallujah during the Iraq War
- Operation Dawn (2012), a Turkish Armed Forces operation against the Kurdistan Workers Party
- Operation Dawn (2014), the operation by Islamic fundamentalists to seize Tripoli International Airport as part of the 2014 Libyan conflict

== See also ==
- Operation Dawn 8: Gulf of Aden, a 2011 operation by the Royal Malaysian Navy against pirates in the Indian Ocean
- Operation Breaking Dawn, a 2022 operation by Israel against targets in Gaza
