= Mxmtoon =

American singer-songwriter and YouTuber (born 2000)

mxmtoon
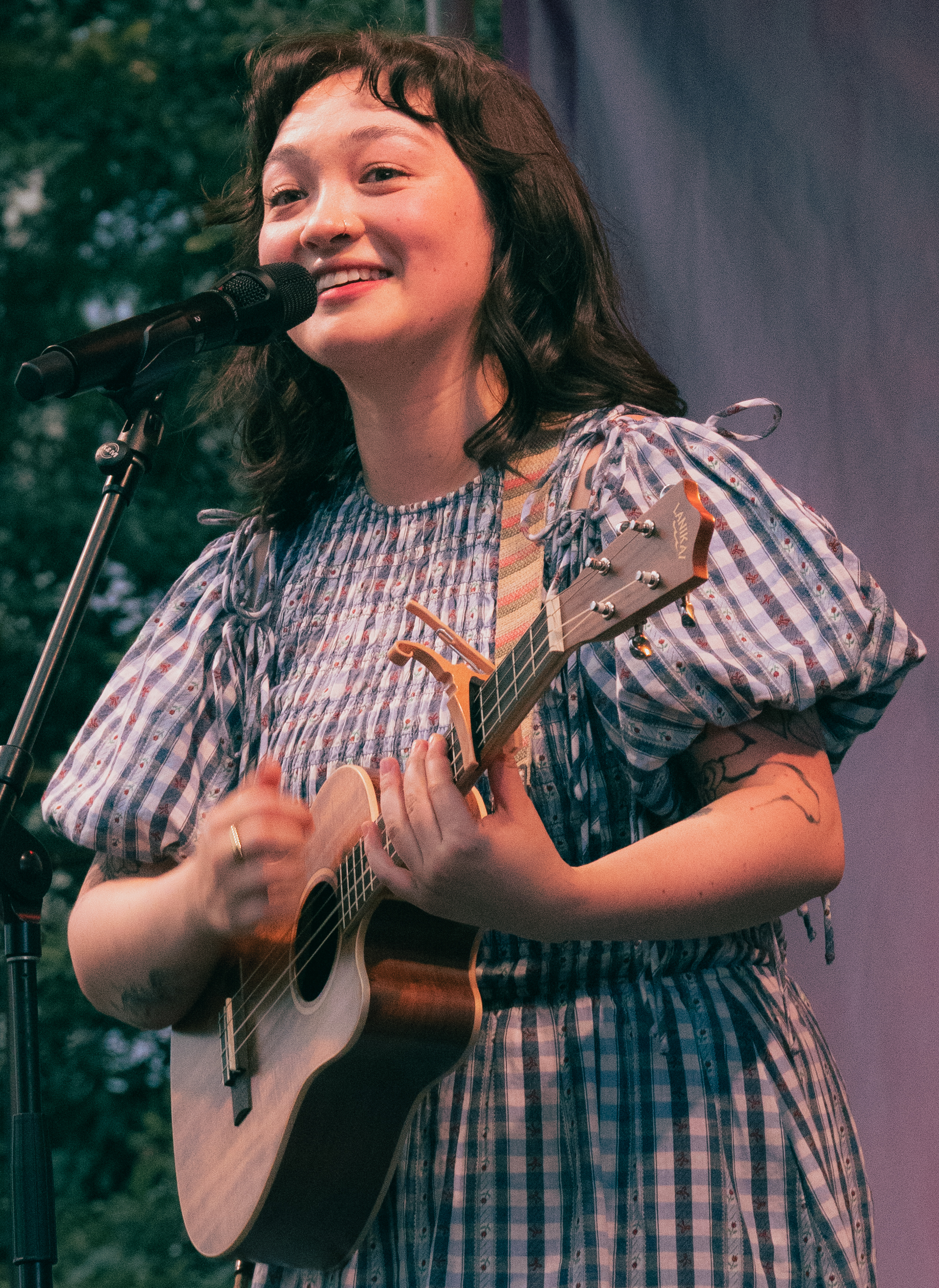
- Maia in August 2025
- Born: Maia Xiao-En Moredock-Ting; July 9, 2000 (age 26); Oakland, California, U.S.
- Occupations: Singer-songwriter; Twitch streamer; YouTuber
- Years active: 2013–present

Twitch information
- Channel: mxmtoon

YouTube information
- Channel: mxmtoon
- Genres: Music; vlogging
- Subscribers: 973 thousand
- Views: 143.2 million
- Musical career
- Genres: Bedroom pop; lofi hip hop; folk-pop
- Instruments: Vocals; ukulele
- Labels: Self-released; Kobalt; House Arrest; AWAL
- Last updated: April 4, 2026
- Website: mxmtoon.com

Maia Xiao-En Moredock-Ting (born July 9, 2000), known professionally as mxmtoon (/ɛmɛksɛmˈtuːn/ em-ex-em-TOON) or just Maia, is an American singer-songwriter and YouTuber. Her music is characterized by emotionally transparent, confessional lyrics and often employs the ukulele. She released her first EP, Plum Blossom (2018); her debut album, The Masquerade (2019); the 2020 twin EPs—Dawn and Dusk; and her second studio album Rising (2022). In 2024, she released her third studio album, Liminal Space.

Maia began self-releasing songs in secret in 2017, before the size of her online presence became too substantial to conceal. In addition to involvement with music, Maia is a streamer on Twitch, has made a podcast, has released two graphic novels, and provided protagonist Alex Chen's singing voice in Life Is Strange: True Colors. She has collaborated with artists such as Carly Rae Jepsen, Ricky Montgomery, Cavetown, and Chloe Moriondo, and resides in Nashville, Tennessee.

== Early life ==
Maia was born on July 9, 2000, in Oakland, California; she grew up near Lake Merritt. Her mother is Chinese-American, and her father is German and Scottish. While at school, she enjoyed taking art and architecture classes. She became interested in music from a young age; her brother took violin lessons, and in first grade, Maia joined him. A few years later, she began playing classical cello and trumpet.

In fifth grade, she auditioned for her school rock band. Expecting to audition for cello, she was instead asked to sing Oasis' song "Wonderwall", and ended up joining as a vocalist, where she recalls singing "The Middle" by Jimmy Eat World. In sixth grade, she began playing guitar, learning in part from her father.

Maia first coined the name "mxmtoon" on her Instagram account, where she drew cartoon sketches. She started a YouTube channel in September 2013, and began playing the ukulele in middle school. She wrote her first song at age 13.

== Career ==
=== 2017–2018: Plum Blossom ===
Maia began self-releasing songs on YouTube under the online alias "mxmtoon" in 2017; the name is derived from her initials. Although she started her career secretly, subsequent growth of her online presence compelled her to disclose her activity in this field to her family. Her early oeuvre was recorded with GarageBand in her parents' guest bedroom, and percussion tracks were created with found objects such as hair straighteners. After initially attempting to write comedy songs, she began writing in a confessional style.

Her 2017 collaboration with lo-fi producer Peachy, "Falling for U", became an early signature song; it has since garnered more than three hundred million streams on Spotify. (Note: As of January 2023.) In 2018, Maia released her debut EP, Plum Blossom; It was accompanied by the "Plum Blossom Tour", scheduled for the March of the following year. While it was initially scheduled for five US shows with fellow Californian singer-songwriter Khai Dreams in March 2019, it sold out and was extended to include additional concerts in North America and Europe, including opening appearances for bedroom pop YouTuber Cavetown.

After high school, Maia took a gap year by postponing college to focus on her music. She was planning to study architecture after graduating from high school, until her music went viral in April 2018.

=== 2019–2021: The Masquerade, Dawn, and Dusk ===
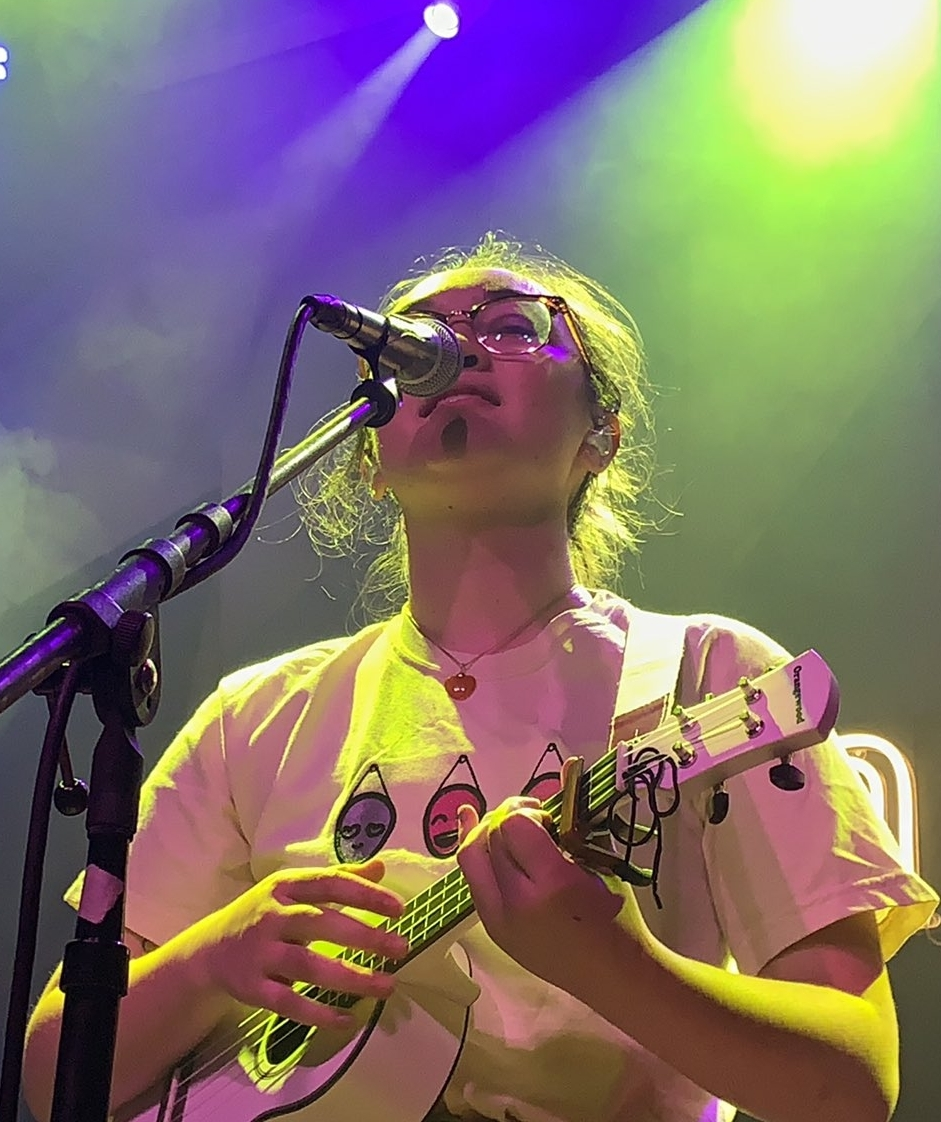
Maia performing in Portland in September 2019

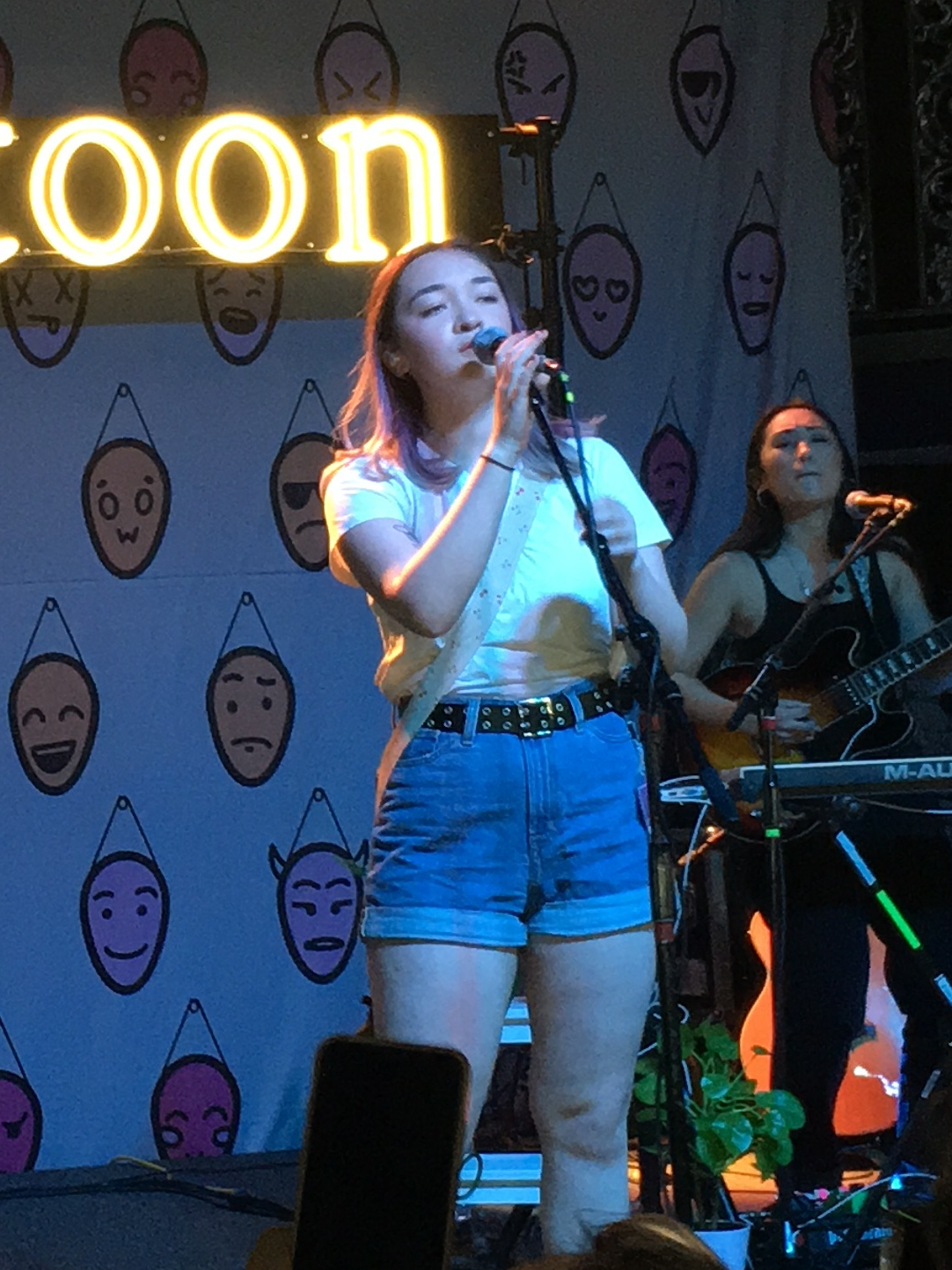
Maia in November 2019 in Atlanta

Maia's debut studio album, The Masquerade, was released on September 17, 2019; the album peaked at number 45 on the US Indie Albums Chart. "Prom Dress", the lead single, found considerable usage on social media platform TikTok, where it has been used in over a hundred thousand videos. The album's release had been accompanied by 21 Days, a podcast in audio diary format by Spotify that concerned Maia's activities while working on the project in New York City. To support the album, Maia embarked on The Masquerade Tour, of North America and United Kingdom, in the same month of the album's release. Her first graphic novel, The Adventures Of mxmtoon: The Masquerade, began selling in October 2019. In the succeeding month, Maia signed to the label of Kobalt Music Group, under a global publishing deal. She released a remix album, The Masquerade (The Edits) soon after, and recorded "Prom Dress" in Simlish, the fictional language used in The Sims games.

Maia released her first single of 2020, "Fever Dream", in January. "Fever Dream" was followed by EP Dawn in April; accompanying EP Dusk was released in October. In an interview given in the interregnum between the releases of the two EPs, Maia detailed an intention to make music that "gracefully said thank you and goodbye" to her past work. Dawn and Dusk were soon amalgamated to form album Dawn & Dusk; in the meantime, she also started a daily history podcast, 365 days with mxmtoon.

Maia was featured in Dork's Hype List of 2020, alongside artists including Girl in Red, Beabadoobee and Maisie Peters. In the March of the following year, she was announced as the singing voice for Alex Chen, the protagonist of the Square Enix game Life Is Strange: True Colors. An accompanying EP entitled True Colors (from Life is Strange) was released concurrently.

=== 2022: Rising ===
In February 2022, Maia announced a North American tour for her then-upcoming album Rising, entitled "rising (the tour)"; it was indicated that fellow musician Chloe Moriondo would be joining her in concert. She also released "Mona Lisa", which served as the lead single for the album. Further tour dates across the United Kingdom, Europe, and Australasia were announced in the following month, with Ricky Montgomery accompanying her on European and British touring dates.

Rising was released on the twentieth of May, after releases of singles "Sad Disco", "Victim of Nostalgia", and "Coming of Age". A deluxe version followed in September, which includes the song Plastic Pony, which gained streams after it was featured in the film Ruby Gillman, Teenage Kraken.

=== 2023: Plum Blossom (Revisited) ===
On October 2, 2023, Maia announced the re-recording of her first EP Plum Blossom, which would be releasing on November 10, 2023. She also unveiled an accompanying tour.

On October 5, she released "Feelings are Fatal" onto streaming services. On October 25, she released "The Idea of You". When the EP released, it received acclaim from critics for having modern sound quality and for Maia's more mature vocals.

=== 2024–present: Liminal Space ===
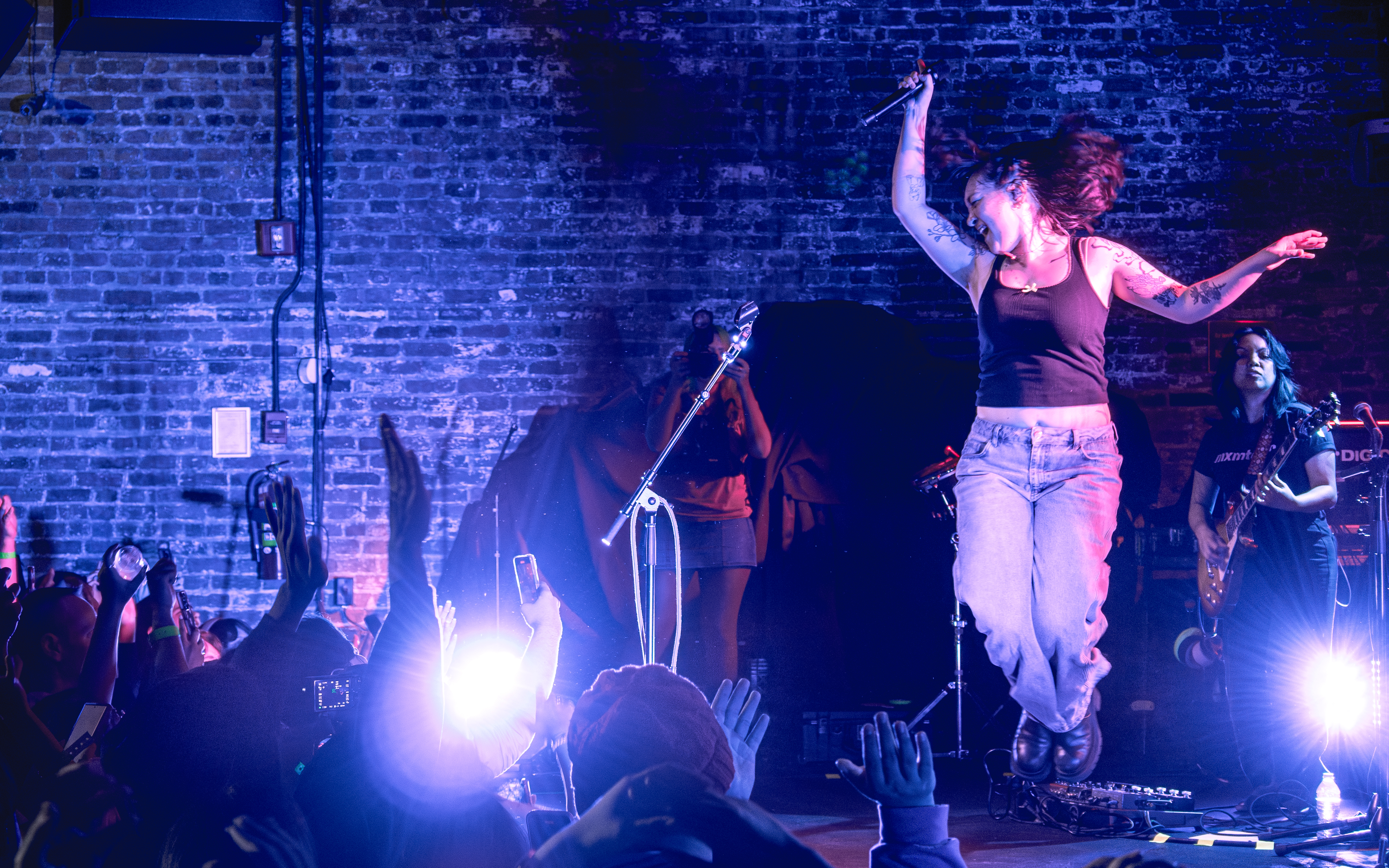
Maia performing at Brooklyn Bowl in 2025

Maia was an opener for AJR's The Maybe Man tour in the summer of 2024.

On June 29, Maia revealed her single "I Hate Texas" while opening for the tour. Subsequently, she released the song "The Situation" featuring Kero Kero Bonito on September 4, and also announced her third studio album, titled Liminal Space, released on November 1.

In 2024, she performed the song, I Wonder Why, from the children's television in Yo Gabba Gabbaland in the episode 10, Wonder, in Season 1.

Maia also released a third single, "Rain", as part of the album rollout on October 10. In 2025, she embarked on the accompanying Liminal Space Tour, starting in Nashville on February 18, and ending in Belfast on April 29. Maia recorded a cover of "I Fall In Love Too Easily" for the 2025 tribute album Chet Baker Re:imagined.

On November 11, 2026, Maia announced her memoir, mxmtoon: life, love, and the lack thereof: learning to live through song on social media. The book is published under her full name, which she had previously not shared publicly. It is scheduled to release on April 6, 2027.

== Public image ==
I can be as ridiculous as I want but I can also be an emo teenager and people like both sides.

— mxmtoon

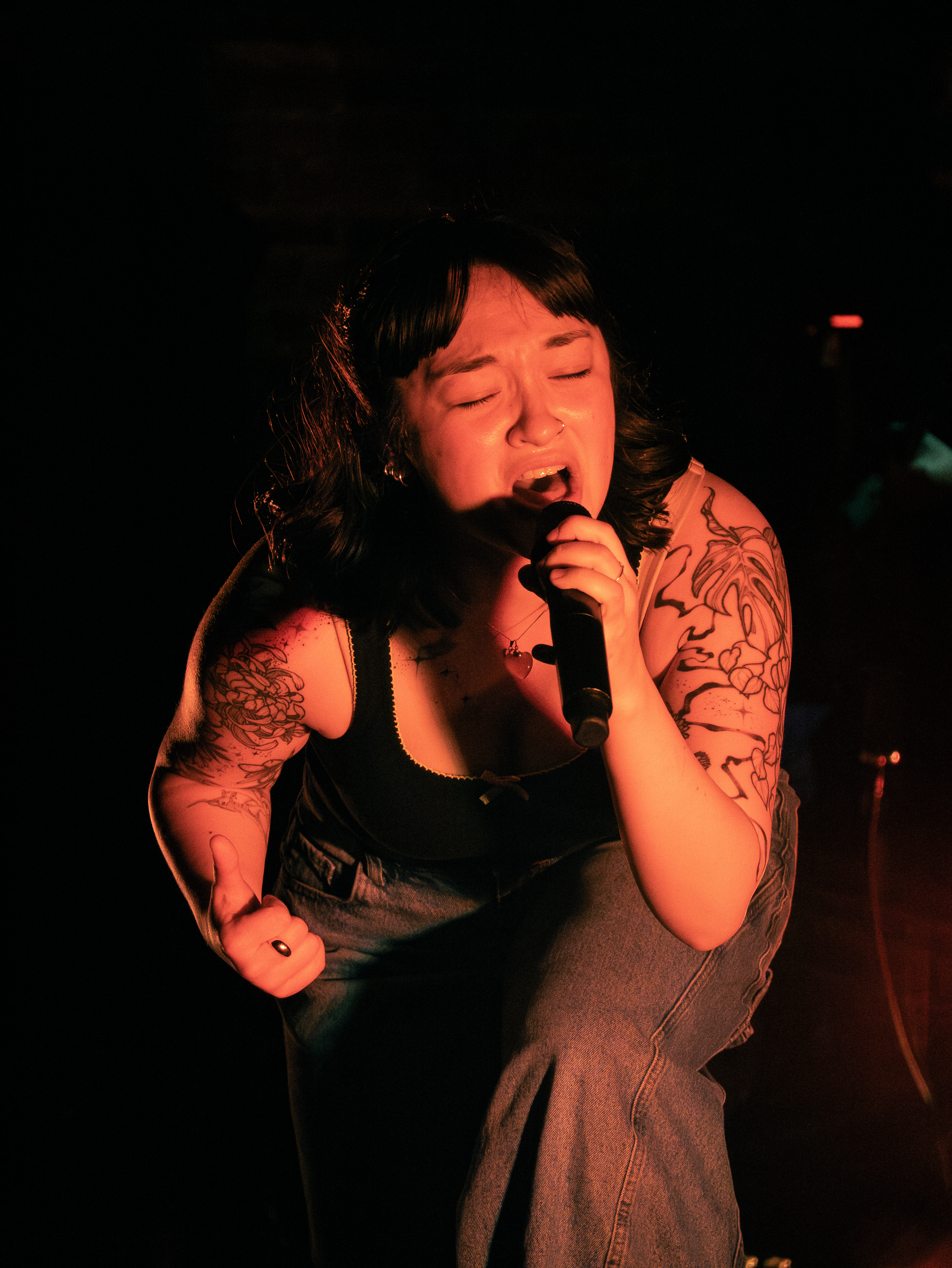
Maia in 2025

Maia has been credited in NPR criticism as having an "endearingly intimate presence". Her music has been described as "warm folk-pop tunes with acoustic ornamentations", "one part acoustic-pop a-la Kina Grannis, mixed with sharp lyricism and avant-garde, off-kilter melodics akin to Fiona Apple or PJ Harvey", and artistry that "explore[s] themes such as the trials of love, being a burden to those close to you, and connecting with your family's heritage". Joshua Bote of Paste wrote that Maia "might be the songwriter a new generation needs", noting that she is "made for these times" and is "armed with a ukulele, a sardonic charm and social media savvy;" he went on to describe her as "really, really good at the internet".

Grant Rindner of Nylon wrote: "With a commitment to covering topics she rarely hears addressed by other artists, and a keen understanding of how to bond with her audience, she's emerged as a charming and relatable singer-songwriter with a massive platform." After attending Maia's performance at the Gramercy Theatre, Briana Younger of The New Yorker wrote, "She sang of routine high-school problems, such as crippling self-doubt and unrequited love, with an emotional sophistication that reminded us that there are some things we never outgrow." Joe Coscarelli of New York Times compared Maia's bedroom pop style to that of Girl in Red, Clairo and Beabadoobee, as well as the folk-pop "simplicity" of Regina Spektor and The Moldy Peaches; he described her as a character "who overflows with earnestness and giggles", and her rise in popularity as the assemblage of "an independent, D.I.Y. mini-empire almost by accident".

Maia remains active on TikTok, where she has amassed over three million followers and 168 million likes, as of October 2025. To date, she has had online presences on Vine, Tumblr, Facebook, Twitch, Snapchat, Bandcamp, Pinterest, and SoundCloud, as well as TikTok. She also streams on Twitch, where she has over 210,000 followers.

== Artistry ==
=== Influences ===
Maia has cited Arctic Monkeys, The Black Keys, Sufjan Stevens and Elliott Smith as her influences. She also has credited inspiration from female artists, such as Clairo.

== Personal life ==
Maia is a bisexual woman from a family of immigrants and currently lives in Nashville, Tennessee, where she writes, records, and produces her own music from her home that she shares with her younger brother. She graduated from high school in 2018. In Maia's youth, her parents played R&B and hip-hop, including Salt-N-Pepa and A Tribe Called Quest, which she still listens to "for nostalgia".

Maia has been diagnosed with premenstrual dysphoric disorder; in 2021, she partnered with Kotex, a brand that sells menstrual hygiene products, to discuss her experience living with the disorder.

== Discography ==
mxmtoon discography
- Studio albums: 3
- EPs: 8
- Compilation albums: 1
- Singles: 30

=== Studio albums ===
Title	Details	Peak chart positions	
Title	Details	US Heat.	US Indie
The Masquerade	Released: September 17, 2019; Label: Self-released; Format: CD, LP, cassette, digital download, streaming	17	45
Rising	Released: May 20, 2022; Label: Self-released, AWAL; Format: CD, LP, cassette, digital download, streaming	—	—
Liminal Space	Released: November 1, 2024; Label: Self-released, AWAL; Format: CD, LP, cassette, digital download, streaming	—	—

=== Compilation albums ===
Title	Details
Dawn & Dusk	Released: September 23, 2020; Label: Self-released, AWAL; Format: LP, digital download, streaming

=== Extended plays ===
Title	Details	Peak chart positions
Title	Details	US Curr.
Plum Blossom	Released: December 7, 2018; Label: Self-released; Format: CD, cassette, digital download, streaming	—
Plum Blossom (The Edits)	Released: April 26, 2019; Label: Self-released; Format: Digital download, streaming	—
The Masquerade (The Edits)	Released: November 22, 2019; Label: Self-released; Format: Digital download, streaming	—
Dawn	Released: April 22, 2020; Label: Self-released, AWAL; Format: Digital download, streaming, cassette	—
Dawn (The Edits)	Released: July 24, 2020; Label: Self-released, AWAL; Format: Digital download, streaming	—
Dusk	Released: October 1, 2020; Label: Self-released, AWAL; Format: Digital download, streaming, cassette	—
Dusk (The Edits)	Released: February 19, 2021; Label: Self-released, AWAL; Format: Digital download, streaming	—
True Colors (from Life Is Strange)	Released: September 10, 2021; Label: Self-released, AWAL; Format: Digital download, streaming	83

=== Singles ===
==== As lead artist ====
Title	Year	Peak chart positions	Certifications	Album
Title	Year	MEX Air.	Certifications	Album
"1-800-DATEME"	2017	—		Non-album singles
"Life Online"	2017	—		Non-album singles
"Please Don't"	2017	—		Non-album singles
"Hong Kong"	2017	—		Non-album singles
"Stuck"	2017	—		Non-album singles
"Birdie"	2017	—		Non-album singles
"The Sideline"	2017	—		Non-album singles
"The Idea of You"	2017	—		Plum Blossom
"Feelings Are Fatal"	2017	—		Plum Blossom
"Cliché"	2017	—		Plum Blossom
"I Feel Like Chet"	2018	—		Plum Blossom
"Porcelain"	2018	—		Plum Blossom
"Temporary Nothing"	2018	—		Plum Blossom
"Don't Play Your Card"	2018	—		Non-album singles
"My Way"	2019	—		Non-album singles
"Prom Dress"	2019	—	RIAA: Platinum	The Masquerade
"High & Dry"	2019	—		The Masquerade
"Seasonal Depression"	2019	—		The Masquerade
"Blame Game"	2019	—		The Masquerade
"Dream of You"	2019	—		The Masquerade
"Fever Dream"	2020	—		Dawn
"Quiet Motions"	2020	—		Dawn
"Lessons"	2020	—		Dawn
"Bon Iver"	2020	—		Dusk
"Ok On Your Own" (featuring Carly Rae Jepsen)	2020	—		Dusk
"Creep"	2021	—		True Colors (from Life Is Strange)
"Mona Lisa"	2022	—		Rising
"Sad Disco"	2022	23		Rising
"Victim of Nostalgia"	2022	—		Rising
"Coming of Age"	2022	—		Rising
"Nobody Loves Me" (with Ricky Montgomery and Cavetown)	2023	—		Non-album singles
"Post-Post Apocalyptic Dance Party"	2024	—		Non-album singles
"I Hate Texas"	2024	—		Liminal Space
"The Situation" (featuring Kero Kero Bonito)	2024	—		Liminal Space
"Rain"	2024	—		Liminal Space

==== As featured artist ====
Title	Year	Certifications	Album/EP
"Falling for U" (Peachy! featuring mxmtoon)	2017	RIAA: Gold	Non-album singles
"Maybe I Shouldn't" (Mochi featuring mxmtoon)	2017		Non-album singles
"So Mean" (Afternoon featuring mxmtoon, Samsa & Love-Sadkid)	2017		Non-album singles
"We Used to Talk Like Every Night" (Isiah A. featuring mxmtoon)	2019		Non-album singles
"Walk but in a Garden" (LLusion featuring mxmtoon)	2020		Non-album singles
"Pride" (Noah Kahan featuring mxmtoon)	2020		Non-album singles
"Queen" (G Flip featuring mxmtoon)	2021		Non-album singles
"Line Without a Hook" (Remix) (Ricky Montgomery featuring mxmtoon)	2021		Non-album singles
"Prairies" (BoyWithUke with mxmtoon)	2022		Serotonin Dreams
"Back from the Dead" (Lyn Lapid with mxmtoon)	2024		Non-album single

=== Guest appearances ===
List of non-single guest appearances, with other performing artists
Title	Year	Other artist(s)	Album
"I Wonder Why"	2024	Yo Gabba Gabba	Yo Gabba GabbaLand!

== Bibliography ==
- The Adventures Of mxmtoon: The Masquerade (with Ellie Black, Self-published, 2019) ISBN 0-578-55170-5
- The Adventures Of mxmtoon: Dawn & Dusk
- mxmtoon: life, love, and the lack thereof: learning to live through song (Weldon Owen, 2027) ISBN 9798886742077

== Other media ==
=== Video games ===
Maia has contributed music to multiple video game projects including The Sims, Life Is Strange: True Colors, and her music and likeness was included in the Dave the Diver – Dave & Friends DLC released October 24, 2024.

== Awards and nominations ==
Year	Organization	Award	Work	Result	Ref.
2019	Dork	Hype List 2020	Herself	Included	
2020	NME	The NME 100	Herself	Included	

== Tours ==
Headlining

- Plum Blossom Tour (2019)
- The Masquerade Tour (2019)
- dawn & dusk Tour (Cancelled)
- rising (The Tour) (2022)
- plum blossom (revisited) tour (2023)
- liminal space tour (2025)
