= Ang Anak ng Dumalaga =

1933 novel by Iñigo Ed. Regalado

- Author: Iñigo Ed. Regalado
- Language: Tagalog
- Genre: Novel
- Publisher: Limbagan Ilagan at Sanga
- Publication date: 1933
- Publication place: Philippines
- Media type: Print
- Preceded by: Ang Huling Pagluha
- Followed by: Naging Lunas ng Pighati

Ang Anak ng Dumalaga (specifically translated as "The Offspring of the Pullet" [young hen], "The Child of the Pullet", or "The Daughter of the Pullet"; although alternatively dumalaga may mean "a female carabao or water buffalo at the age of puberty") is a Tagalog-language novel written by Filipino novelist Iñigo Ed. Regalado. It was published in 1933 in Manila, Philippines by the Limbagan Ilagan at Sanga during the American period in Philippine history (1898-1946). Ang Anak ng Dumalaga was one of the novels Regalado had written during the Golden Age of the Tagalog Novel.

== Description ==
The main character of the novel is Gunding, a sexually liberated and promiscuous Filipino woman. Regalado's Anak ng Dumalaga was a variation of the author's other novel with a similar theme, the Sampagitang Walang Bango (Jasmine Without Fragrance). However, Ang Anak ng Dumalaga was written with a “more contemporary context”. Gunding, due to her reputation as a woman who pursues “sexual adventures” and “escapades” came to be labeled as a "dumalaga" or a “pullet”. Gunding's notoriety was the main reason why her daughter, Felicidad (figuratively, Felicidad is the "pullet's child"), discontinued her relationship with her lover in order to pursue a life as a nun inside a convent. By becoming a nun, Felicidad thought that she would be able to persuade her mother Gunding to change her lifestyle. At the end of the novel, Gunding's husband became insane. Gunding's spouse set down their house on fire, burning all of their possessions.
