= Ricky Montgomery =

American musician and songwriter (born 1993)

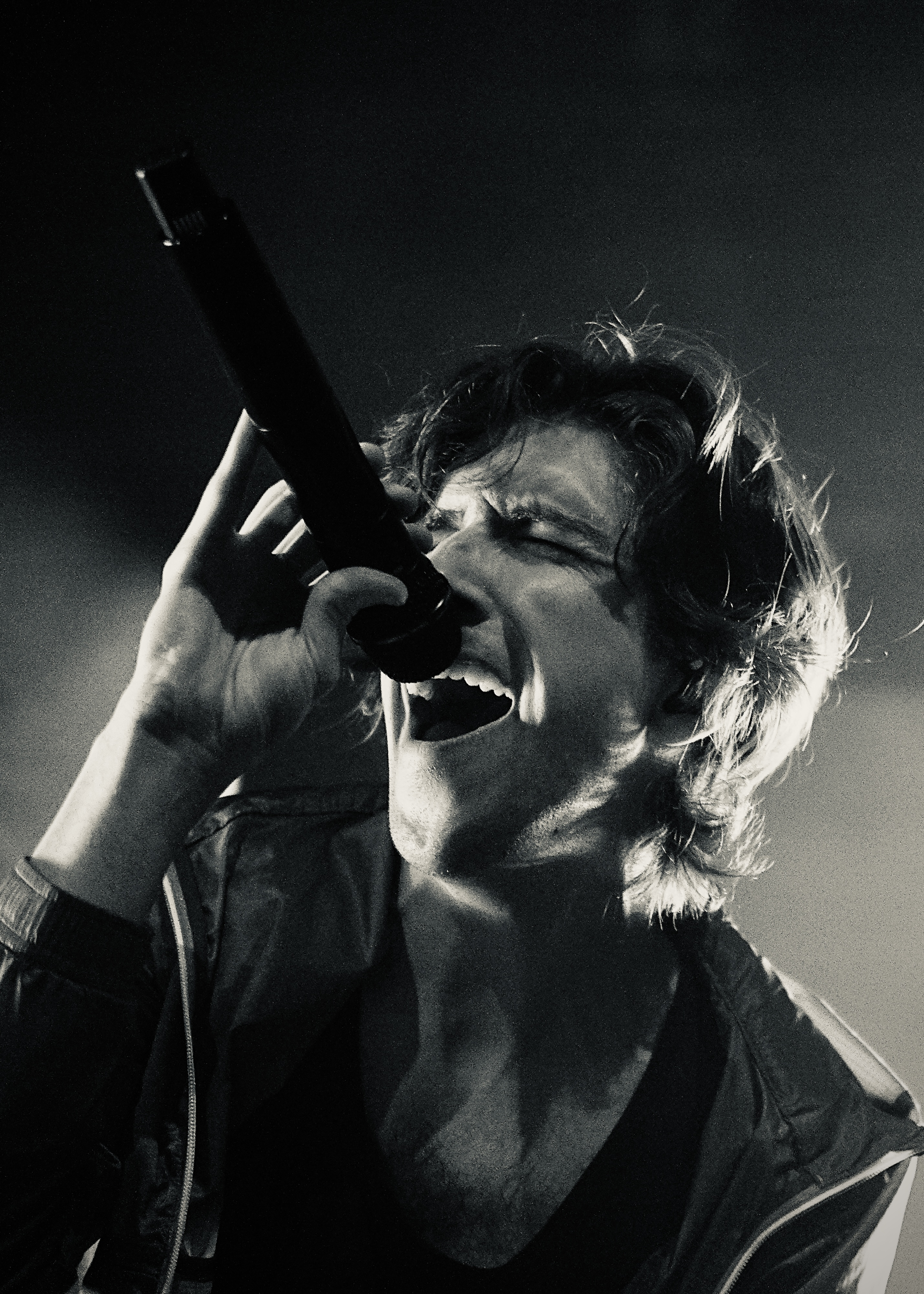
- Montgomery in 2024

Background information
- Born: Richard Owen Holmes Montgomery; April 3, 1993 (age 33); Los Angeles, California, U.S.
- Origin: St. Louis, Missouri, U.S.
- Genres: Indie pop; alternative pop; bedroom pop
- Years active: 2014–present
- Labels: Election Day; Warner; Many Hats
- Spouse: Jess Joho (m. 2025)
- Website: rickymontgomery.com

Richard Owen Holmes Montgomery (born April 3, 1993) is an American singer-songwriter. He (Note: Montgomery uses both he/him and they/them pronouns. This article uses he/him for consistency.) is best known for his breakout hits "Mr. Loverman" and "Line Without a Hook," which went viral on TikTok in 2020.

== Early life ==
Richard Owen Holmes Montgomery was born in Los Angeles on April 3, 1993. His father was a gaffer, and he has described his mother as "changing careers a lot". When Montgomery was young, his parents got a divorce, and in 2005, he and his mother moved to St. Louis, Missouri, where he lived from ages 12–21, and also attended college. At the age of 14, he began to play in various bands. In 2014, he gained a following on Vine, a short-form video service, posting comical original songs. He found the site the day after the app had launched from a CNN news article. He saw the site as a potential "springboard for a possible music career." After finding success with Vine, Montgomery released his first EP, Caught on the Moon. Soon after, he dropped out of college and returned to Los Angeles to pursue a musical career.

In 2009, Montgomery's father died in Mexico. His father's death was initially thought to be a scuba-diving accident; however, Montgomery later discovered his father committed suicide after finding hand-written letters. In regard to this experience, Montgomery said he initially "didn't talk about it a lot", but in 2023, he released the song "Black Fins", about his father's death.

He has a sister.

== Personal life ==
Montgomery is non-binary and uses he/they pronouns.

Montgomery proposed to his then-girlfriend, writer, journalist, and critic Jess Joho, in late May 2024. In January 2025, the pair announced they were officially engaged as of January 5. They were legally married in December 2025.

== Career ==
In LA, he released his first studio album Montgomery Ricky on April 1, 2016. Montgomery founded indie band The Honeysticks with a childhood friend of his to experiment musically, and in 2017, they released their first single: "Out Like a Light". The band name was derived from a snack Montgomery ate every Saturday morning when he was a kid, made of sticks of honey. In 2018, he took the year off from making music. He has started social media marketing companies to earn more money. By 2020, he considered quitting making music entirely. However, in mid-2020, during the COVID-19 pandemic, his two singles—"Mr. Loverman" and "Line Without a Hook"—went viral on TikTok. With his explosion in popularity, he was contacted by "virtually every single major label A&R in a matter of months." In December 2020, after a large bidding war, Montgomery signed with Warner Records.

I think because we had a really traumatizing year, these songs kind of found a moment, because they're all, in their own way, about traumas in my life.

— Ricky Montgomery

Since then, he has remixed two songs in 2021 from his debut album with fellow artists Chloe Moriondo and mxmtoon respectively. Montgomery came in contact with mxmtoon after finding her perform one of his songs on the streaming platform Twitch, learning that she had been a fan of his Vine content before it shut down. He found Moriondo from a song cover of "Out Like a Light".

On going viral leading to a record deal, he told Vox that despite virality in songs or a record deal, artists get stuck on a perpetual treadmill of self-promotion: "Next thing you know, it’s been three years and you’ve spent almost no time on your art. You’re getting worse at it, but you’re becoming a great marketer for a product which is less and less good."

On October 8, 2024, Montgomery announced the single, "Superfan", and confirmed that he had been dropped as an artist by Warner Records.

== Discography ==
=== Albums ===
- Montgomery Ricky (2016)
- Rick (2023)
- Rick(y) (2024)

=== EPs ===
- Caught on the Moon (2014)
- The Honeysticks (2018)
- It's 2016 Somewhere (2022)
- Montgomery Ricky (Plus 3) (2026)

=== Singles ===
- "Out Like a Light" (2017)
- "Out Like a Light 2" (2019)
- "Cars" (2020)
- "Line Without a Hook" (2021), (Note: This is a remake of the song from the album Montgomery Ricky with singer mxmtoon.) ARIA: Platinum, BPI: Silver, RIAA: Platinum, MC: Platinum
- "Mr. Loverman" (2021), (Note: This is a remake of the song from the album Montgomery Ricky with musician Chloe Moriondo.) ARIA: Platinum, BPI: Gold, RIAA: Platinum, MC: Platinum
- "Talk to You" (2021)
- "Sorry for Me" (2021)
- "Eraser" (2023)
- "Don't Say That" (2023)
- "Nobody Loves Me" (2023)
- "Black Fins" (2023)
- "Boy Toy" (2023)
- "It's OK to Cry" (2024)
- "Unknown Phantom" (2024)
- "Superfan" (2024)
- "Oh My My" (2026)
