= Iñigo Ed. Regalado =

Filipino poet, journalist and politician (1888–1976)

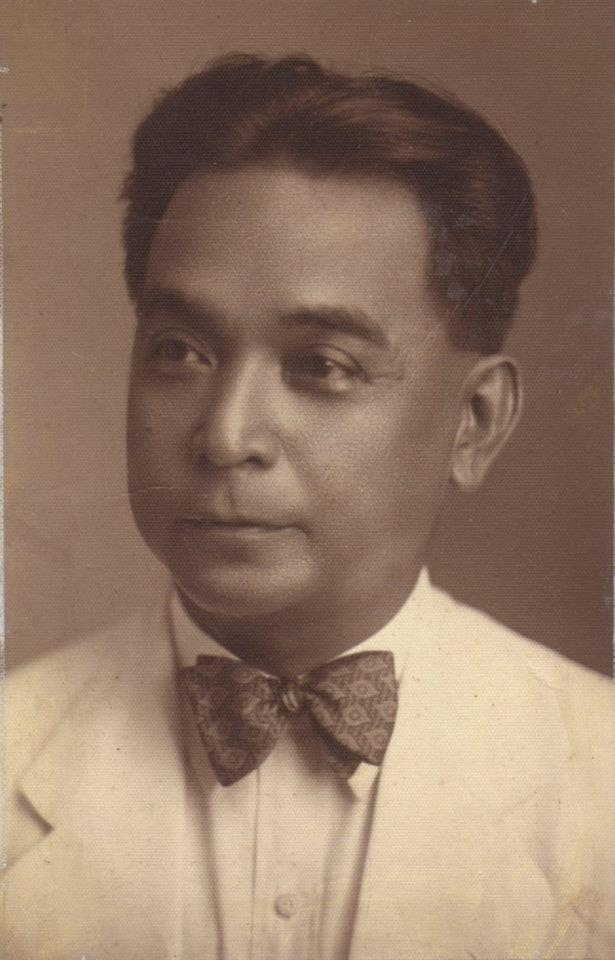

14th Vice Mayor of Manila
- In office January 1, 1950 – December 31, 1951
- Mayor: Manuel de la Fuente
- Preceded by: Carmen Planas
- Succeeded by: Bartolome Gatmaitan

Member of the Manila Municipal Board
- In office January 1, 1934 – January 4, 1940

Personal details
- Born: Íñigo Edgardo Regalado y Reyes; June 1, 1888 Sampaloc, Manila, Captaincy General of the Philippines
- Died: July 24, 1976 (aged 88) Manila, Philippines
- Occupation: Poet and novelist

Iñigo Edgardo Reyes Regalado (1 June 1888 – 24 July 1976), also known as Iñigo Ed. Regalado, was a Filipino poet, journalist, novelist and politician. He was the son of Iñigo Corcuera Regalado, the renowned Tagalog printer and journalist, and Saturnina Reyes. As an editor, Iñigo Ed Regalado was one of the "powerful voices" in the newspapers and magazines during the first part of the 1900s. It was during his time when the Golden Age of the Tagalog Novel (1905–1921) started. The whole period of the Golden Age of the Tagalog Novel was from 1905 to 1935.

== Early life ==
He was born in Sampaloc, Manila. He received his Bachelor of Arts degree from the Liceo de Manila in 1907. He finished studying Law from the Academia de la Jurisprudencia on 1913. He became a writer in the newspapers Taliba, Ang Mithi (The Goal), Ang Watawat (The Flag), Pagkakaisa (Unity), the weekly newspaper Ilang-ilang, and Liwayway.

== Career ==
He was one of the initiators of the Surian ng Wikang Pambansa. He became a language professor in different universities in Manila. He was the dean of the Department of the Pilipino Language of the Centro Escolar University. He was also a former councilor of the City of Manila.

== Literary achievements ==
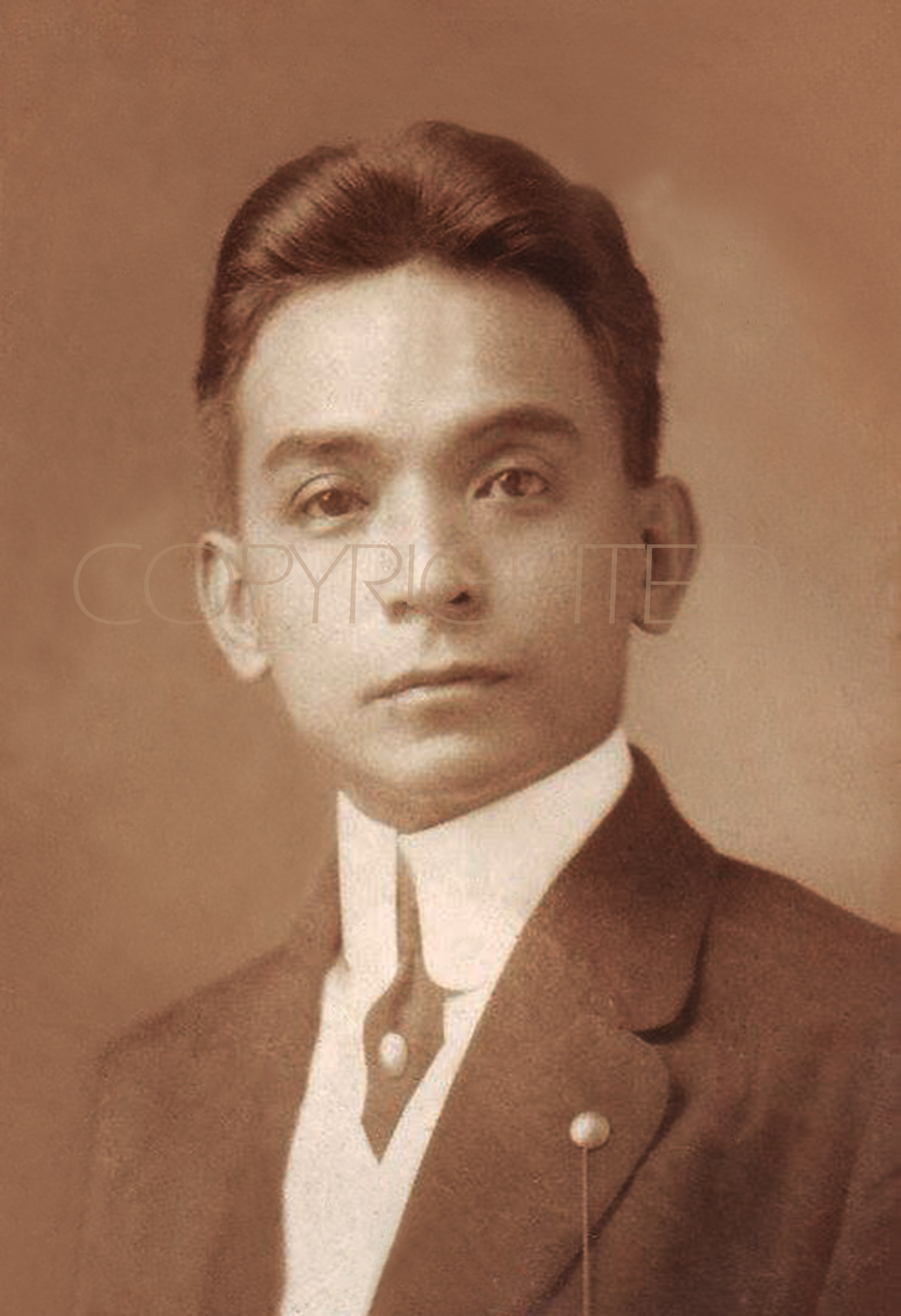

Among his awarded works were the 1964 poem Tilamsik (literally splash [of water] or spark [of fire]), the 1941 compilation entitled Damdamin (feelings, emotion). Damdamin won the first prize during the first poetry competition during the time of the Commonwealth of the Philippines in 1941. He wrote more than 26 novels. His works belonged in "The Golden Age of the Tagalog Novel". Among his well-known works was Prinsesa Urduja (Princess Urduja), a play that was presented in the Cultural Center of the Philippines. He also wrote for Telembang: Lingguhang Mapagpatawa at Manunukso, which published the first regular komiks strip in the Philippines entitled, Si Kiko at si Angge, in 1922. The strip was written by Regalado and illustrated by National Artist Fernando Amorsolo. It depicted the lives of Filipinos under the American colonial rule via the competing politics and points of view of its eponymous husband and wife.

== Literary style ==
Regalado was careful in choosing descriptive words for his writing. He used clear characterization, natural dialogues and settings for his novels and short stories.

== Death ==
He died on 24 July 1976 due to lung cancer at the Our Lady of Lourdes Hospital in Manila at the age of 88.

== Works ==
=== Novels ===
The following are Regalado's novels:

- Madaling Araw (Dawn) (1909)
- Kung Magmahal ang Dalaga (How a Maiden Loves) (1911)
- Ang Labing-apat na Awa (The Fourteen Graces) (1912)
- Sampagitang Walang Bango (Jasmine Without Fragrance) (1921)
- May Pagsinta'y Walang Puso (Heartless Love) (1921)
- Ang Huling Pagluha (The Final Shedding of Tears) (1933)
- Ang Anak ng Dumalaga (Child of the Pullet) (1933)
- Naging Lunas ng Pighati (Became the Solution to Sorrow) (1933)
- Dalaginding (Young Maiden)

=== Poetry ===
- Sabi Ko Na Nga Ba (That's What I Thought)
- Dahil sa Pag-ibig (Because of Love)
- Alalahanin (Remembering)
