= Navodaya =

Navodaya (lit. 'New Dawn') may refer to

- Navodaya, a modern literature movement in the Kannada language
- Navodaya Appachan (1925–2012), Indian film producer, director, and entrepreneur
  - Navodaya Studio, film studio in the Malayalam language film industry of India, founded by Navodaya Appachan
- Navodaya Institute of Technology, a college in Raichur, India
- Navodaya Medical College, a medical college in Raichur, India
- Navodaya Times, an Indian Hindi-language newspaper established in 2013 and published in Delhi
- Saju Navodaya, Indian film actor

== See also ==
- New Dawn (disambiguation)
- Jawahar Navodaya Vidyalaya, government schools operated by the Ministry of Education, Government of India
