= USS Dawn (IX-186) =

History

United States
- Name: USS Dawn
- Builder: Moore Shipbuilding Company, Oakland, California
- Completed: 1920
- Acquired: 25 December 1944
- Commissioned: 26 December 1944
- Decommissioned: 12 April 1946
- Fate: Transferred to War Shipping Administration 12 April 1946, scrapped 1947
- Notes: Built as commercial tanker SS Vacuum

General characteristics
- Type: Tanker
- Displacement: 15,381 tons (full load)
- Length: 438 ft 5 in (133.63 m)
- Beam: 57 ft (17 m)
- Draft: 27 ft 6 in (8.38 m)
- Propulsion: Steam engines
- Speed: 9 knots
- Complement: 107
- Armament: 1 × 4 in (100 mm) gun; 1 × 3 in (76 mm) gun; 8 × 20 mm antiaircraft guns

The third USS Dawn (IX-186) was a United States Navy tanker in commission from 1944 to 1946.

Dawn was built in 1920 as the commercial tanker Vacuum by Moore Shipbuilding Company at Oakland, California. During World War II it came under control of the War Shipping Administration, which transferred it to the U.S. Navy at Brisbane, Australia, on 25 December 1944. It was commissioned on 26 December 1944 as the "miscellaneous unclassified" ship USS Dawn (IX-186).

Dawn departed Brisbane on 7 January 1945 for Hollandia, New Guinea, where it completed its outfitting between 17 January 1945 and 24 January 1945. It then carried gasoline to Leyte in the Philippine Islands, where it arrived on 2 February 1945. It provided floating gasoline storage in the Philippines until 11 November 1945.

On 11 November 1945, Dawn got underway for San Diego, California, arriving there on 1 January 1946. On 8 January 1946, it departed for Norfolk, Virginia, arriving there on 8 February 1946.

Dawn was decommissioned at Norfolk on 12 April 1946 and transferred to the War Shipping Administration the same day. It is currently in San Francisco Bay ghost fleet, row J.
