= Mga Ibong Mandaragit =

1969 novel by Amado Hernandez

- Author: Amado V. Hernandez
- Language: Tagalog
- Genre: Fiction
- Publication date: May 1, 1969
- Publication place: Philippines

Mga Ibong Mandaragit or Mga Ibong Mandaragit: Nobelang Sosyo-Politikal (literally, Birds of Prey: A Socio-Political Novel) is a 1969 novel by the Filipino writer and social activist, Amado V. Hernandez. Mga Ibong Mandaragit, hailed as Hernandez's masterpiece, focuses on the neocolonial dependency and revolt in the Philippines. The novel reflects Hernandez's experience as a guerrilla intelligence officer when the Philippines was under Japanese occupation from 1942 to 1945.

== Plot ==
The novel begins in September 1944, when the weakening of the forces of the Japanese Empire in the Philippines has become increasingly noticeable. Mando Plaridel and fellow guerrillas Karyo and Martin reach the hut of Tata Matias in the Sierra Madre mountain range, after fleeing from a failed struggle against Japanese soldiers, who attacked their camp in Sampitan. Mando and Matias exchange information about the movement as well as their personal problems, in which Mando reveals that he had once been an orphan boy who ran away after being betrayed by his master to the Japanese. Matias brings up Jose Rizal's Noli Me Tángere and El filibusterismo, specifically the fate of the main character Simoun's wealth after Padre Florentino disposed of his treasures. (Note: As depicted in El filibusterismo's final chapter.) Tata Matias believes that the characters in the novels are real because, allegedly, his family knew the real "Padre Florentino"; he asserts that Simoun's wealth could be used to supply the rebellion. He encourages the younger guerrillas to seek out the whereabouts of the missing treasure.

Meanwhile, in Manila, an overseer farmer named Pastor deals with Don Segundo Montero, a wealthy landowner and a collaborator of the Japanese Imperial Army. Pastor asks about his sister's son, Andoy, who had once been employed by Montero. Montero disparages his former servant as a barbarian, alleging the boy fled independently and was captured by the Japanese – unaware that Andoy had joined the resistance under the name Mando.

Eventually, Mando finds Simoun's treasure in an iron chest from the ocean near Atimonan. Karyo is attacked by a shark, and Martin – wanting to claim the discovered wealth for himself – dies at Mando's fists. Mando brings the chest to Matias, intending to hand the riches to the hermit, but Matias insists that the fate of the treasure lies in Mando's hands. Ultimately, he decides that he would not use the wealth for himself.

The war finally ends in 1945, and the Japanese forces in Manila surrender. With Japan's defeat, Don Segundo Montero's alliances have shifted to become pro-American. He hosts a dinner for visiting US Army officials, wherein a lieutenant has a brief fling with his daughter Dolly. Months later, the lieutenant does not return and Dolly has become pregnant. Dolly goes to Hong Kong for an abortion before resuming her socialite life.

Mando goes to meet Magat Dalisay, the head of the Kalayaan guerrilla. Magat announces that the war has ended, and he plans to return to Manila in retirement. Magat suggests that Mando come with him, but the latter says he has unfinished business in Kalayaan. Using his newfound wealth, he buys a printing press building on Azcarraga Street, rents a house for Tata Matias, and founds a Filipino-language newspaper, Kampilan (lit. 'cutlass') with the help of Magat, Matias, and other former guerrillas. Taking inspiration from Rizal, Mando establishes the Freedom University in Manila with his longtime friend Dr. Sabio.

Montero sends Pastor to the Montero Plantation in the province to collect unpaid debt from the laborers. There, Pastor discovers that Iman, a writer for Kampilan, had interviewed Rubio, the workers' union leader who had joined forces with Danoy and Mang Tomas, leaders of the farmers' federation, to start a petition. Subsequently, Mando and Magat travel to the plantation (and the former's old home) to interview the overseer. Unable to recognize his own nephew, Pastor vents his frustrations to them. Learning that both visitors are former guerrillas, Pastor inquires if they know Andoy. Mando conceals his identity, claiming that Andoy was an acquaintance who entrusted him with a box.

Kampilan publishes the union leaders' side with the help of Dr. Sabio's advice. Mando brings "Andoy's" belongings to Pastor and his cousin Puri, which contain a letter, jewels, and money worth one thousand pesos. Afterwards, he sells the remaining riches and jewelry then entrusts the running of the paper to Magat before traveling to countries in Asia, Europe, and the United States. During Mando's absence, a libel threat places the Kampilan under public scrutiny, so Magat responds by publishing an editorial titled "Mga Ibong Mandaragit" (birds of prey). Pastor is fired by Montero from his overseer duties and is replaced by a former soldier named Captain Pugot.

Years pass, and Mando builds a reputation as a wealthy jewelry merchant. In Paris, he encounters Dolly at a nightclub and intervenes when a man harasses her. Grateful for his assistance, she invites him to dinner, where they discuss their past experiences before spending the night together – unaware that Mando is the former servant boy she had abused in her youth.

Mando travels to New York City as his final overseas stop before returning to the Philippines. Upon his return, he attends the Montero family's housewarming party in Manila. There, he is scrutinized by Montero and several government officials including the visiting president, who criticizes Kampilan. A farmers' protest erupts at the Montero Plantation, leading Rubio to call for a mass rally in Manila to demand a general strike. Mando reunites with Puri and Pastor; he invites Puri to come live with him and confesses his feelings to her, although she does not answer him yet.

As the rally is happening in Plaza Miranda, a man-made fire breaks out in Central Luzon which affects multiple farms. In response, Captain Pugot orders the arrest of Pastor, Danoy, and Mang Tomas. Pugot ambushes a Manila-bound bus carrying Pastor, Tomas, and Puri, and holds the two men captive. Puri immediately runs to Mando in Kampilan's headquarters, who is being visited by Dolly. Dolly becomes jealous of the attention Mando gives his cousin. After he leaves to find Magat, the women converse about each other's lives, as well as the conditions in the plantation, before escalating into a heated argument where Dolly storms off. Elsewhere, Pastor is beaten and tortured, while Mang Tomas attempts to escape and is killed. Kampilan publishes an issue with an image of his corpse on the front page.

With his reputation crumbling, Montero decides to confront Mando in Baguio as a national conference for newspaper editors is being held. The don bargains with Mando, offering to buy Kampilan. However, Mando completely refuses, insisting on press freedom and that the newspaper is not a business, then leaves – but not before revealing to both father and daughter his true identity as their former servant, Andoy.

The conflict continues and worsens when bandits begin to raid and terrorize Captain Pugot and his guards after Mang Tomas's death. Kampilan publishes an exposé of the abuses and deaths in the farms, listing the names of the greedy politicians. Meanwhile, Mando and Puri profess their love for each other. One night, while driving, Mando is ambushed by gangsters, though the attack fails and he survives the gunshot. While recovering in the hospital, Mando finally reveals his identity to Puri and Pastor.

In the aftermath, Captain Pugot is found hanged from a tree, while Don Segundo suffers a heart attack that leaves him incapacitated. Mando, Magat, and Senator Maliwanag – an ally of the reform movement – meet with the President who seeks a political compromise to pacify the violence that Kampilan's articles have incited. However, during a rally where farmers burn effigies of corrupt officials, Pastor is killed. The novel concludes with Mando secretly meeting with Rubio and Danoy, the surviving union leaders, and vows that they will dedicate their strength and lives to establishing a free nation where the Filipino people are the true masters of their own land.

== Characters ==
- Mando "Andoy" Plaridel: The main character of the novel. His real name is Alejandro Pamintuan, but used the name "Mando" after joining the guerrilla movement. He was betrayed to the Japanese by his master, Don Segundo Montero, when he failed to salute a soldier. Andoy also used to be schooled by Don Segundo. After his fight with Martin, he earns a scar on his left cheek.
- Don Segundo Montero: A rich landowner, merchant and Japanese collaborator who lived along Manila Bay. As a wealthy landowner obsessed with maintaining social status, Don Segundo Montero made an agreement with the new Japanese conquerors. He used his finances, possessions, relatives, and staff. Don Segundo Montero reiterated his ability to make friends with the Americans after they defeated the Japanese in their return to the Philippines.
- Matias Dipasupil: Nicknamed "Tata Matias," he was a former revolutionist during the Spanish and American colonial period who instills the idea of getting Simoun's treasure to Mando. He lives as a hermit in the mountains of Sierra Madre. His home is considered a safe haven for guerrilla soldiers who journey through the forest, and he had become known as the "old man of the mountains." The two initially met during Mando's journeys to pass messages for the guerrilla forces; at the start of the novel, months have passed since his last visit to Matias's house. He serves as Mando's guide and advisor throughout the novel due to his vast knowledge of Rizal's works.
- Magat Dalisay: Mando's associate and the head of the guerrilla in the town of Kalayaan. Before the war, he had been an educated copyreader and proofreader, and wrote articles in the local newspaper. Magat is a nationalist and a strong believer in a pro-Filipino movement, greatly abhorring foreign-assisted movements such as the Makapili.
- Pastor: A farmer and Mando/Andoy's uncle.
- Puri: Pastor's daughter and Mando's cousin.
- Dolores "Dolly" Montero: Don Segundo's daughter, a great beauty, and the betrothed of Colonel Moto of the Japanese Imperial Army before he committed seppuku. Like her father, Dolly was abusive to Mando as a child, and rats him out to the Don after discovering his journal that detailed war news outside the Philippines. She becomes pregnant with Moto's child but loses it in the womb. Later, after a brief fling with American lieutenant Whitey, she becomes pregnant a second time but eventually aborts it in Hong Kong when Whitey does not return to marry her.
- Doña Julia Montero: Don Segundo's wife and Dolly's mother.
- Lilibeth: Dolly's friend whose pilot husband had been killed in Bataan.
- Governor Oscar Doblado: The governor of the province where the Montero Plantation is located. His wife is the wealthy Doña Ninay.
- Captain Pugot: The Montero Plantation overseer who succeeded Pastor. He is a former soldier, knowing nothing about the land and blindly obeyed the Japanese. His real name is "Caballero."

== Background ==
The narrative, illustrates Hernandez's yearning for change and the elevation of the status of Philippine society and living conditions of Filipinos. The setting is in the middle of 1944, when the armed forces of the Japanese Empire were losing.

The novel acts as a sequel to Jose Rizal's historic Noli Me Tangere and El filibusterismo. The protagonist Mando Plaridel is tested by Tata Matyas, an old revolutionary, on his knowledge about Rizal and Rizal's novels. Similar to Rizal's novel, the main character examines the Philippines as an outsider while traveling in Europe. Hernandez's novel also tackles the lead character's search for Simoun's treasure, acting as a continuation of Rizal's El Filibusterismo. The novel portrays the conditions of the citizenry at the onset of industrialization brought forth by the Americans in the Philippines. Mga Ibong Mandaragit had been translated into English and Russian.

Carlos P. Romulo wrote the preface for this book, while Epifanio San Juan Jr. wrote its afterword of the book in Tagalog and English. The Tagalog version came first which was immediately followed by the English translation titled Epilogue (Epilogo). According to Romulo, the novel narrates "and discusses the problems of the citizens, of the life of the people and society and their environment". The book has 69 chapters and 416 pages.
