= Dawn Career Institute =

Coordinates: 39.7546°N 75.5954°W

- Motto: Your brighter future begins today.
- Type: For-profit
- Established: 1976
- Location: Newark, Delaware, United States
- Website: http://www.dawncareerinstitute.edu

Dawn Career Institute, located in Newark, Delaware, is a private post-secondary institution of higher education serving Delaware, south-central and south-eastern Pennsylvania, and northern Maryland. The institute offers both campus-based and online career-focused diploma programs, leading to professional certifications and licenses in a variety of healthcare and wellness fields. Dawn Career Institute was founded April 1, 1976 as an aviation school. On February 12, 1999, the school became Dawn Training Centre, and in October 2009, the school changed its name again to Dawn Career Institute. On December 22, 2017, the campus relocated to its present site at 252 Chapman Road, Newark, Delaware. The 25,047-square-foot facility features modernized classrooms and laboratory spaces, a newly equipped computer lab, and designated areas for the Learning Resource Center and Career Services Department, which together form the central core of the campus.

DCI maintains accreditation through the Accrediting Commission of Career Schools and Colleges (ACCSC) and holds approval from the Delaware Department of Education as a private business and trade school, including authorization for Veterans Administration (VA) training programs. Furthermore, the institution is certified by the U.S. Department of Education to disburse Title IV financial aid, encompassing Pell Grants, Direct Student Loans (DSL), and Parent Loans for Undergraduate Students (PLUS).

== Accreditation ==
Dawn Career Institute holds institutional accreditation from the Accrediting Commission of Career Schools and Colleges (ACCSC). It is officially recognized by the Delaware Department of Education as a private business and trade school and is authorized to provide training eligible for Veterans Administration (VA) benefits. Additionally, the institution is approved by the U.S. Department of Education to administer Title IV financial aid programs, including Pell Grants, Direct Student Loans (DSL), and Parent Loans for Undergraduate Students (PLUS).

== Programs ==
Programs include HVAC Technician, Medical Assisting, Nursing Assistant, and Practical Nurse, as well as continuing education courses in the skilled trades and healthcare fields.
