= Madaling Araw =

1909 novel by Iñigo Ed. Regalado

- Author: Iñigo Ed. Regalado
- Language: Tagalog
- Genre: Novel
- Publication date: 1909
- Publication place: Philippines
- Media type: Print
- Followed by: Kung Magmahal ang Dalaga

Madaling Araw ("Dawn") is a 1909 Tagalog-language novel written by Filipino novelist Iñigo Ed. Regalado. The 368-page novel was published in Manila, Philippines by the Aklatang J. Martinez (J. Martinez Library) during the American period in Philippine history (1899–1946). Madaling Araw won for Regalado a Panitikan Series (Literature Series) Philippine National Book Award. The novel is both a romance novel and a political novel.

== Characters ==
From Juan Galit, the other characters in the novel were Kabesang Leon (also known as Kapitan Leon, meaning Captain Leon, literally "Captain Lion", "Lion, the Head", or "Lion, the Leader"), Mauro, Luisa, Daniel, Nieves, and Pendoy. Mauro is a painter and a poet. Mauro is in love with Luisa, however Luisa's parents has a dislike for Mauro. Daniel, on the other hand, is in love with Nieves. Nieves is the daughter of a wealthy father. Pendoy is a character that was obsessed with Luisa and Nieves, thus wanted to ruin the relationships between Mauro and Luisa, and between Daniel and Nieves. Pendoy, apart from the parents of Luisa and Nieves, became one of the obstacles affecting the relationships in the story.

== Description ==
Madaling Araw was written by Regalado when he 18 years old. According to literary critic Soledad Reyes, Madaling Araw was a complex and expansive novel that tackled issues that were personal to the author, as well as socio-political topics. In Madaling Araw, Regalado utilized the use of meanings or definitions to suppress the ills of Philippine society. Regalado used Juan Galit as a tool for this technique of usage of meanings. Beyond the romantic theme, Madaling Araw embarked upon the topics of poverty and other socio-economic conditions in the Philippines. Juan Galit (the name literally means "John [the] Angry") became the representation of the avenger for the poor and bringer of justice. The poor had been exploited by Kabesang Leon, by an uncle of Mauro, and by other foreign capitalists residing in the country. At the end of Madaling Araw, Galit is seen as an advocate of bloodshed and a preacher of anarchy, emphasizing to the Filipino people that bloodshed is important in the struggle for justice, because it was the only way for society to be able to cleanse and then reestablish itself. This also emphasized that anarchy was a tool that can overthrow the ills of society. Galit's assassination of Kabesang Leon symbolized the eradication of Filipinos who collaborated with the Americans, one of the perceived causes of the suffering of the poor in the Philippines. Kabesang Leon was the personification of evil that represented the Filipino collaborators who tried to subjugate the lower class in Philippine society.

== See also ==
- Without Seeing the Dawn by Stevan Javellana
- Po-on by F. Sionil José
