= Operation Dawn (1967) =

Egyptian military operation planned to strike the Israeli Air Force

Operation Dawn, code-name Fajr (الفجر) in Arabic, was a rejected Egyptian military proposal planned by General Abdel Hakim Amer, as tension built between Israel and Egypt ahead of what was to become the Six Day War. It was not approved by Egyptian President Gamal Abdel Nasser, who was committed to not attacking Israel, unless Israel attacked first. Amer’s proposal was to strike the Israeli Air Force, in the prelude to what would become the Six-Day War. The Egyptian attack plan was to also involve strategic bombing of major ports, the Negev Nuclear Research Center near Dimona, airfields and cities. Arab armies would then attack, effectively cutting Israel in half with an armoured thrust from northern Sinai via the Negev desert.

== Chronology ==
Egyptian President Gamal Abdel Nasser had provoked Israel when he closed the Straits of Tiran on May 22, 1967.

Abdel Hakim Amer, an Egyptian general, planned the operation, which were it to have been approved would have taken place on May 27, 1967.

According to the Israeli diplomat Michael Oren, Operation Dawn was called off after Nasser was informed by the Soviet Union that the United States was aware of the plan. Israel sent urgent messages to the United States on May 25, 1967, saying an attack from Egypt was imminent.

== Debate about whether Egypt had really posed an imminent military threat ==
The White House ordered an intelligence assessment, which found the Israeli claims unfounded. Israeli prime minister Levi Eshkol wrote on a copy of one of the urgent messages transmitted to the United States "All to create an alibi".

According to Avi Shlaim: "All of Nasser’s plans depended on the assumption that the Israelis would strike the first blow. The president rejected the first strike option as politically impossible because he thought it would give the United States and Israel the very pretext for which they were looking. International opinion would be alienated, the Soviets might withdraw their support, and the United States could enter the war on Israel’s side."

According to John Quigley, there is thin evidence that there was any Egyptian plan to attack Israel that would actually have been carried out.

Some Israelis claimed that they knew from "Egyptian uncovered documents" that there was an Egyptian plan to attack and cut off Negev, capture Eilat, and make occupied land contiguous to Jordan.
