= USS Dawn (SP-37) =

Patrol vessel of the United States Navy

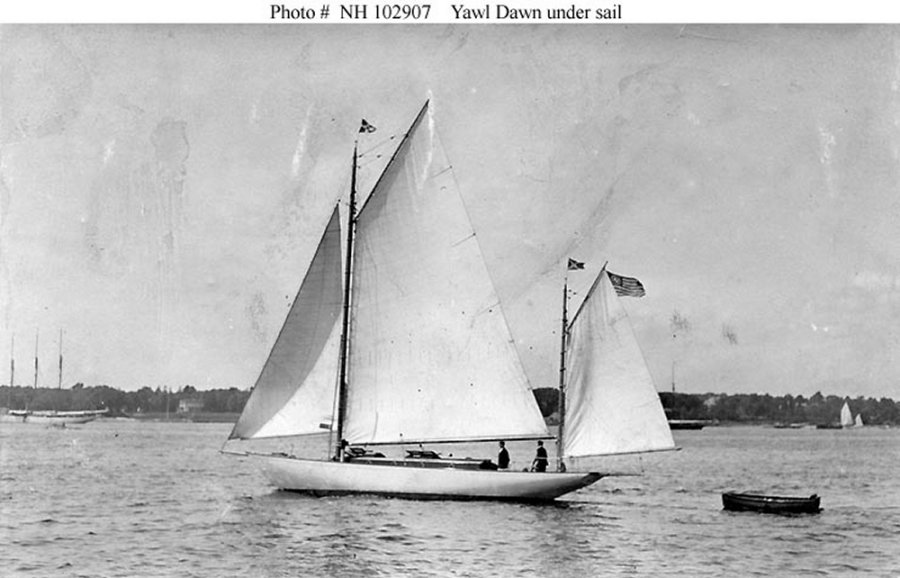
- Dawn ca. 1916–1917.

History

United States
- Name: USS Dawn (proposed)
- Namesake: Previous name retained (proposed)
- Builder: F.C. Adams Shipbuilding Company, Booth Bay, Maine
- Completed: 1916
- Acquired: Ordered delivered 14 May 1917
- Commissioned: Never
- Fate: Lease cancelled June 1917; Returned to owner December 1917
- Notes: Registered as SP-37 for potential U.S. Navy service

General characteristics
- Type: Patrol vessel (proposed)
- Length: 52 ft 2 in (15.90 m)

- Note: This ship should not be confused with USS Dawn (SP-26), which was in commission during the same era.

USS Dawn (SP-37) was the proposed designation for a patrol boat that never actually served in the United States Navy.

Dawn was a private yawl built in 1916 by the F.C. Adams Shipbuilding Company at Booth Bay, Maine. On 14 May 1917, the U.S. Navy ordered her owner, Franklin Farrel Jr. of New Haven, Connecticut, to deliver her to the Navy for service as a patrol boat in World War I, and she was registered accordingly with the naval section patrol designation SP-37. However, the Navy cancelled its lease for her in June 1917 and returned her to Farrel in December 1917 without commissioning her.
