= A New Dawn =

First edition, cover art by Bob Eggleton

A New Dawn: The Don A. Stuart Stories of John W. Campbell, Jr. is an archival collection of science fiction stories by John W. Campbell, published in hardcover by NESFA Press in 2003. The volume was compiled and edited by James A. Mann. It includes all 16 stories published by Campbell under that pseudonym, as well as two Campbell/Stuart nonfiction pieces and an introduction by Barry N. Malzberg. Gary K. Wolfe declared that "the collected Stuart stories constitute a key document in the intellectual history of SF".

== Contents ==
- "The Man Who Lost the Sea", Barry N. Malzberg (introduction)
- "Twilight", (Astounding 1934)
- "Atomic Power", (Astounding 1934)
- "The Machine", (Astounding Stories 1935) Machine series #1
- "The Invaders", (Astounding Stories 1935) Machine series #2
- "Rebellion", (Astounding Stories 1935) Machine series #3
- "Blindness", (Astounding Stories 1935)
- "The Escape", (Astounding Stories 1935)
- "Night", (Astounding Stories 1935)
- "Elimination", (Astounding Stories 1936)
- "Frictional Losses", (Astounding Stories 1936)
- "Forgetfulness", (Astounding Stories 1937)
- "Out of Night", (Astounding Stories 1937) Aesir series #1
- "Cloak of Aesir", (Astounding Stories 1939) Aesir series #2
- "Dead Knowledge", (Astounding Stories 1938)
- "Who Goes There?" (Astounding Stories 1938)
- "The Elder Gods" (Unknown 1939)
- "Strange Worlds" (essay) (Unknown 1939)
- "Wouldst Write, Wee One?" (essay) (Scienti-Snaps 1940)

All items (except the introduction) were written by John W. Campbell and published under his "Don A. Stuart" pseudonym. "The Elder Gods", although attributed to Campbell alone for many years, is now credited as Campbell's reworking of "Of Divers Enchantments", an otherwise unpublished story by Arthur J. Burks.
