= 1958 Palanca Awards =

Philippine literary award

8th Palanca Memorial Awards

The 8th Carlos Palanca Memorial Awards for Literature was held to commemorate the memory of Carlos T. Palanca, Sr. through an endeavor that would promote education and culture in the country.

== English Division ==
=== Short Story ===
- First Prize: Nick Joaquin, "La Vidal"
- Second Prize: Lilia Pablo Amansec, "Lilies of Yesterday"
- Third Prize: Florencio Garcia, "The Dwarf Pinetree"

=== One-Act Play ===
- First Prize: Azucena Grajo Uranza, "Versions of the Dawn"
- Second Prize: Wilfrido D. Nolledo, "Legend of the Filipino Guitar"
- Third Prize: S.R. Sievert, "Justice is But a Seeming"

== Filipino Division ==
=== Maikling Kwento ===
- First Prize: Ponciano B. Pineda, "Ang Mangingisda"
- Second Prize: Simplicio Bisa, "Mahaba ang Daang Bakal"
- Third Prize: Pedro S. Dandan, "Lakas"

=== Dulang May Isang Yugto ===
- First Prize: Amado V. Hernandez, "Muntinlupa"
- Second Prize: Fernando L. Samonte, "Kamatayan sa Loob ng Isang Kuta"
- Third Prize: Pedro S. Dandan, "Bahid ng Dugo sa Mukha ng Buwan"

== Sources ==
- "The Don Carlos Palanca Memorial Awards for Literature | Winners 1958". Archived from the original on 2009-10-22.
