= Luha ng Buwaya =

1983 novel by Amado V. Hernandez

- Book cover for Amado V. Hernandez's Luha ng Buwaya.
- Author: Amado V. Hernandez
- Language: Tagalog
- Genre: Fiction
- Published: 1983 (Ateneo de Manila University Press)
- Publication place: Philippines

Luha ng Buwaya or, "Crocodile's Tear" in translation, is a novel written by Palanca Awardee and Filipino novelist Amado V. Hernandez. It consists of 53 chapters. The story is about poor farmers uniting against the greedy desires of the prominent family of the Grandes. In Filipino idioms, "crocodiles" were used to symbolize those people who are corrupt. The "buwaya" (crocodile) in the title refers to the Grandes family, who were greedy for money.

== Description ==
Luha ng Buwaya, together with Hernandez's other novel Mga Ibong Mandaragit, was based on his personal experiences while imprisoned in the New Bilibid Prison from 1951 until his release on bail in 1956.

The novel was about peasants from a barrio and their leader, in the person of a school teacher, fighting against oppression and greed. Through their action, the people find renewed belief in their capabilities. In a larger perspective, Luha ng Buwaya was Hernandez's realistic embodiment of the socio-political crisis happening in the Philippines during the 1930s until the 1950s.

Hernandez wrote the novel employing an "easy style" and contemporary Pilipino language. While writing the manuscript for Luha ng Buwaya, Hernandez was also acting as the editor of the prison newspaper named Muntinglupa Courier.
