= USS Dawn (SP-26) =

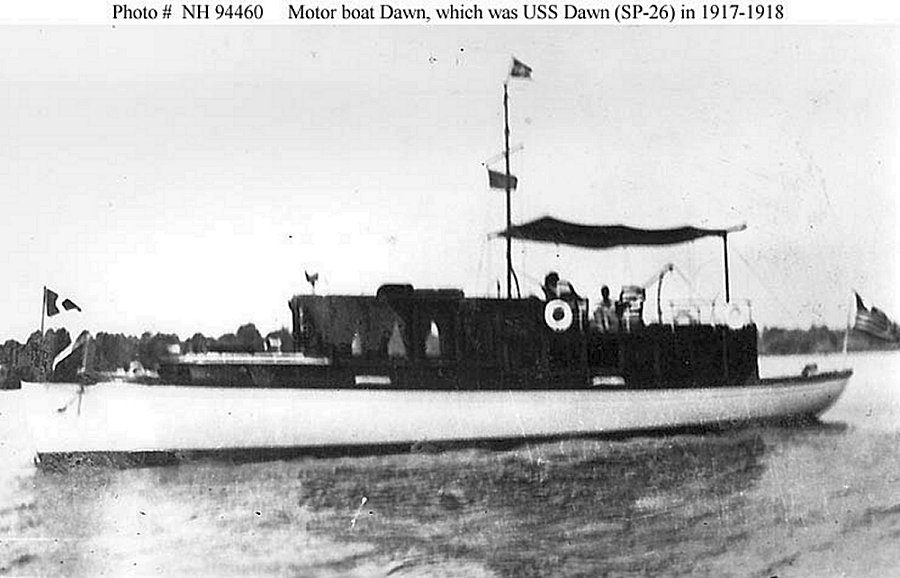
- Dawn as a private pleasure craft sometime between 1914 and 1917, prior to her U.S. Navy service

History

United States
- Name: USS Dawn
- Namesake: Previous name retained
- Builder: Hehre and Aker, Clason Point, The Bronx, New York
- Completed: 1914
- Acquired: 19 June 1917
- Commissioned: 19 June 1917
- Fate: Returned to owner 4 April 1918
- Notes: Operated as private motorboat Dawn 1914-1917 and from 1918

General characteristics
- Type: Repair boat
- Length: 51 ft (16 m)
- Installed power: 60-horsepower (0.045-megawatt) gasoline engine; 20-horsepower (0.015-megawatt) electric motor
- Propulsion: Electric drive, with gasoline engine driving generator to power electric motor; one shaft
- Speed: 9 knots

Note: This ship should not be confused with USS Dawn (SP-37), a yawl ordered delivered to the United States Navy in 1917 but never commissioned into service.

The second USS Dawn (SP-26) was a motorboat that served in the United States Navy as a repair boat from 1917 to 1918.

Dawn was built in 1914 by Hehre and Aker at Clason Point in The Bronx, New York, as a private motorboat of the same name. The U.S. Navy acquired her from her owner, W. T. Donnelley of Brooklyn, New York, on 19 June 1917 for World War I service as a repair boat, deeming her electric-drive propulsion plant suitable for furnishing electric power for lighting, machine shop work, or repairs. She was commissioned as USS Dawn (SP-26) on 19 June 1917, the day of her acquisition from Donnelley.

Dawn was assigned to the 2nd Naval District. Apparently she did not prove satisfactory in service, for a January 1918 U.S. Navy note commented that the Navy had decided to return her to her owner.

The Navy returned Dawn to Donnelley on 4 April 1918.
