= Operation Dawn (2012) =

- Part of the Kurdish–Turkish conflict
Date	8–19 September 2012
Location	Şemdinli, Hakkari, Turkey
Result	Turkish victory

Belligerents
Turkey	Kurdistan Workers' Party (PKK)

Commanders and leaders
(Turkey) Necdet Özel	Murat Karayılan

Strength
2,100 Security Forces	500 soldiers (Turkish claim)

Casualties and losses
22 killed 24 injured	134 killed (60% of PKK members in the region)

Operation Dawn (Turkish: Şafak Operasyonu) also referred as Operation Silent Epic (Turkish: Sessiz Destan Operasyonu) was an operation launched in 2012 by the Turkish Armed Forces against the PKK, who had taken control of Şemdinli.

== Operation details ==
The operation was launched by the Turkish Army and backed by the Turkish Air Force and it lasted for 11 days. Remaining PKK officers have been summoned to the Qandil Mountains. On 29 September the government declared Şemdinli is fully controlled by Turkish forces and operations are about to move to other zones. During this operation a female PKK leader called Ader prepared an attack on an outpost that resulted in 9 soldiers killed.
