= Dawn (Mxmtoon EP) =

EP by Mxmtoon
- Released: April 22, 2020
- Genre: Pop; dream pop
- Length: 20:43
- Label: Self-released; AWAL
- Producer: Alexander 23; Luke Niccoli; Gabe Simon

Mxmtoon chronology
The Masquerade (2019)	Dawn (2020)	Dusk (2020)

Singles from Dawn
- 1. "Fever Dream" Released: January 23, 2020; 2. "Quiet Motions" Released: March 12, 2020; 3. "Lessons" Released: April 9, 2020

Dawn is the second extended play by American musician Mxmtoon. The EP was self-released by the artist (and distributed by AWAL) on April 22, 2020, with an "edits" EP of alternative takes following on July 24, 2020. It was promoted by the singles "Fever Dream", "Quiet Motions", and "Lessons". Dawn sees Mxmtoon shift from the bedroom pop styles of The Masquerade, into straightforward pop. It is the first of a two-EP project, with the sequel Dusk released later in the year. The EPs were originally going to be promoted through the Dusk & Dawn tour across North America in summer 2020, though due to the COVID-19 pandemic that did not occur.

== Critical reception ==
Professional ratings
Review scores
Source	Rating
Exclaim!	7/10
NME	4/5 stars

Dawn received generally favorable reviews from critics. El Hunt of NME called it "her most substantial record yet" and praised its production, vocals, and songwriting. Matt Yuyitung of Exclaim! complimented the EP's expanding sounds, compared her and compared her songwriting to King Princess. Yuyitung also commented on Mxmtoon's move towards pop music, saying "Twenty minutes is all Maia needs to show that pop success is very much in her grasp if she wants it."

== Track listing ==
Credits taken from Tidal.

No.	Title	Writer(s)	Producer(s)	Length
1.	"Fever Dream"	Luke Niccoli; Maia; Micah Premnath	Luke Niccoli	3:16
2.	"Used to You"	Alexander Glantz; Maia	Alexander 23	2:54
3.	"Lessons"	Niccoli; Maia; Premnath	Niccoli	3:32
4.	"Quiet Motions"	Niccoli; Maia; Premnath	Niccoli	2:38
5.	"1, 2"	Niccoli; Maia; Premnath	Niccoli	2:03
6.	"No Faker"	Gabe Simon; Maia	Gabe Simon	2:49
7.	"Almost Home"	Niccoli; Maia; Premnath	Niccoli	3:28
Total length:				20:43

All tracks are written by Maia, Luke Niccoli, and Micah Premnath

Dawn (The Edits)
No.	Title	Producer(s)	Length
1.	"1, 2" (featuring Chloe Moriondo)	Alexander 23	2:48
2.	"Fever Dream" (acoustic)	Niccoli	3:31
3.	"1, 2" (acoustic)	Niccoli	2:02
4.	"Fever Dream" (Shawn Wasabi remix)	Shawn Wasabi	3:03
5.	"Lessons" (BoyInBlue remix)	boyinblue	4:20
Total length:			15:44
