= The Masquerade (album) =

Studio album by Mxmtoon
- Released: September 17, 2019
- Studios: Shifted Recording Studio, Brooklyn, New York City, United States
- Genres: Twee pop; bedroom pop
- Length: 67:42
- Labels: Self-released; House Arrest
- Producers: Cavetown; Mxmtoon

Mxmtoon chronology
| Plum Blossom (2018) | The Masquerade (2019) | Dawn (2020) |

Singles from The Masquerade
- 1. "Prom Dress" Released: May 7, 2019; 2. "High & Dry" Released: June 27, 2019; 3. "Seasonal Depression" Released: July 18, 2019; 4. "Blame Game" Released: August 8, 2019; 5. "Dream of You" Released: August 29, 2019

The Masquerade (stylized in all lowercase) is the debut studio album by indie pop singer-songwriter Mxmtoon, self-released on September 17, 2019. The album was primarily produced by Cavetown and co-produced by Mxmtoon. "Prom Dress", "High & Dry", "Seasonal Depression", "Blame Game" and "Dream of You" were released as singles.

== Background ==
Prior to the album's release, Spotify announced the release of 21 Days, a music podcast which followed Mxmtoon and Cavetown as they worked on the album in New York City. When asked to describe the album with three words in an interview with Urban Outfitters, Mxmtoon described the album as "sad", "evolved" and "universal". The album was recorded at Shifted Recording Studio in Brooklyn.

== Critical reception ==
Professional ratings
Review scores
| Source | Rating |
|---|---|
| Exclaim! | 7/10 |
| Paste | 7.5/10 |

Joshua Bote of Paste described the ten-track album as "comforting twee-pop that wrings out genuine pathos from Mxmtoon's internet celebrity." Matt Yuyitung of Exclaim! wrote "[Maia] brings her wry sense of humour and diary-entry lyricism to her debut record, recalling the lo-fi relatability of Frankie Cosmos." NPR's All Songs Considered wrote the album "straddles whimsy and earnest depth."

== Track listing ==
All tracks are written by Mxmtoon and produced by Mxmtoon and Robin Skinner.

The Masquerade track listing
| No. | Title | Length |
|---|---|---|
| 1. | "Unspoken Words" | 4:06 |
| 2. | "Prom Dress" | 3:17 |
| 3. | "Suffice" | 3:17 |
| 4. | "Blame Game" | 3:29 |
| 5. | "High & Dry" | 3:39 |
| 6. | "My TED Talk" | 3:00 |
| 7. | "Seasonal Depression" | 2:36 |
| 8. | "Untitled" | 3:02 |
| 9. | "Dream of You" | 3:54 |
| 10. | "Late Nights" | 3:16 |
| 11. | "Unspoken Words" (acoustic) | 3:30 |
| 12. | "Prom Dress" (acoustic) | 4:23 |
| 13. | "Suffice" (acoustic) | 3:45 |
| 14. | "Blame Game" (acoustic) | 3:55 |
| 15. | "High & Dry" (acoustic) | 3:43 |
| 16. | "My TED Talk" (acoustic) | 2:32 |
| 17. | "Seasonal Depression" (acoustic) | 2:32 |
| 18. | "Untitled" (acoustic) | 3:14 |
| 19. | "Dream of You" (acoustic) | 3:37 |
| 20. | "Late Nights" (acoustic) | 2:55 |
| Total length: | | 67:42 |

The Masquerade (The Edits)
| No. | Title | Producer(s) | Length |
|---|---|---|---|
| 1. | "Late Nights" (Alexander 23 edit) | Alexander 23; Robin Skinner | 2:54 |
| 2. | "High & Dry" (Chloe Moriondo & Shortly edit) | Chloe Moriondo | 3:48 |
| 3. | "Dream of You" (Chloe Lilac edit) | Chloe Lilac; Sluggo | 3:55 |
| 4. | "Prom Dress" (demo) | Mxmtoon; Reto Peter | 4:41 |
| Total length: | | | 15:18 |

Notes

- All track titles are stylized in all lowercase.

== Personnel ==
Credits adapted from Tidal.

- Mxmtoon – vocals (all tracks), additional producer, music publisher
- Robin Skinner – producer (all tracks)

== Charts ==
Chart performance for The Masquerade
| Chart (2019) | Peak position |
|---|---|
| US Top Heatseekers Albums (Billboard) | 12 |
| US Top Independent Albums (Billboard) | 45 |
