= Roberto T. Añonuevo =

Filipino poet and author (born 1968)

- Born: 1968 (age 57–58); Manila
- Occupations: Filipino poet and author of award-winning anthologies
- Writing career
- Genre: poetry
- Notable works: Paghipo sa Matnag-tubig; Pagsiping sa Lupain
- Notable awards: Don Carlos Palanca Memorial Awards Hall of Fame

Roberto T. Añonuevo (born 1968 Manila) is a Filipino poet and author of award-winning anthologies.

== Life ==
He was raised in Pasig in the Philippines. He was inducted into the Don Carlos Palanca Memorial Awards Hall of Fame for his poems from Talaang Ginto: Gawad Collantes (1990, 1993, 1999) Panorama Poetry Contest (1993) at Diyaryo Filipino (1990). He was one of the honored representatives of the Philippines in the Second ASEAN Poetry Conference Workshop in 1995.

His first book of poetry was published by the De La Salle University in 1994 and is entitled Paghipo sa Matnag-tubig. Ateneo de Manila University then published his other collection known as Pagsiping sa Lupain.

He was made President of the Linangan sa Imahen sa Retorika at Anyo (LIRA) in the same year. He founded ORAGON which is an organization of the most talented writers of the Philippines.

He is the Vice-Chairman of UMPIL – the largest formal group of Filipino writers.

== Awards ==
- Don Carlos Palanca Memorial Awards for Literature
