= List of people from Metro Manila =

This article is a list of notable people from Metro Manila, the capital region of the Philippines. The demonym of Metro Manila is "Metro Manileño" or simply "Manileño."

== Architecture and urban planning ==
- Pablo Antonio (1901–1975): Filipino architect and National Artist. (Binondo)
- Arcadio Arellano (1872–1920): Filipino architect. (Tondo)
- Juan M. Arellano (1888–1960): Filipino architect. (Tondo)
- Edilberto Evangelista (1862–1897): Filipino civil engineer. (Santa Cruz)
- Francisco Mañosa (1931–2019): Filipino architect. (Muntinlupa)
- Tomás Mapúa (1888–1965): Filipino architect. (Binondo)
- Juan Nakpil (1899–1986): Filipino architect and National Artist. (Quiapo)
- Ildefonso P. Santos, Jr. (1929–2014): Filipino National Artist. (Malabon)
- José María Zaragoza (1912–1994): Filipino architect and National Artist. (Quiapo)

== Fashion ==
- Pitoy Moreno (1925–2018): Filipino fashion designer. (Manila)
- Josie Natori (1947): Filipino American fashion designer. (Manila)
- Kermit Tesoro (1988): Filipino accessories and fashion designer. (Manila)

== Finances ==
- Jorge L. Araneta (1936): Filipino businessman. (Manila)
- Betty Go Belmonte (1933–1994): Filipina newspaper publisher. (Santa Mesa)
- Antonio Cabangon-Chua (1934–2016): Filipino businessman and media magnate. (Manila)
- Engracia Cruz-Reyes (1892–1975): Filipino chef and entrepreneur. (Navotas)
- Felipe Gozon (1939): Filipino lawyer and media executive. (Ermita)
- Ramon Jacinto (1945): Filipino business tycoon and musician. (Pasay)
- Eugenio Lopez III (1952): Filipino businessman and media baron. (Manila)
- Ma Mon Luk (1896–1961): Chinese restaurateur. (Binondo)
- Román Ongpin (1847–1912): Filipino Chinese businessman and philanthropist. (Binondo)
- Manuel V. Pangilinan (1946): Filipino businessman and sports patron. (Manila)
- Chick Parsons (1902–1988): American businessman, diplomat and war veteran. (Manila)
- Enrique K. Razon (1960): Spanish Filipino businessman and casino mogul. (Manila)
- Chino Roces (1913–1988): Filipino businessman and media tycoon. (San Miguel)
- Leonardo S. Sarao (1921–2001): Filipino businessman and founder of Sarao Motors. (Las Piñas)
- Andrés Soriano (1898–1964): Spanish Filipino businessman and chief executive of San Miguel Brewery. (San Miguel)
- Andrés Soriano Jr. (1926–1984): Spanish Filipino businessman. (San Miguel)
- Washington SyCip (1921–2017): Chinese Filipino accountant and business executive. (Makati)
- Andrew Tan (1952): Filipino Chinese tycoon. (Manila)
- Manny Villar (1949): Filipino businessman and politician. (Tondo)
- Fernando Zóbel de Ayala y Montojo (1924–1984): Spanish Filipino painter and businessman. (Ermita)
- Jaime Augusto Zobel de Ayala (1959): Spanish Filipino businessman. (Manila)

== Independence activists ==
- Melchora Aquino (1812–1919): Filipina revolutionary. (Caloocan)
- Andrés Bonifacio (1863–1897): Filipino revolutionary. (Tondo)
- Gregoria de Jesús (1875–1943): Filipina revolutionary. (Caloocan)
- Antonio Luna (1866–1899): Filipino revolutionary general. (San Nicolas)
- Andrés Novales (1800–1823): Spanish Army captain who led a revolt against Spanish colonial authorities. (Manila)
- Pío del Pilar (1860–1931): Filipino revolutionary general. (Makati)
- Pío Valenzuela (1869–1956): Filipino physician and patriot. (Valenzuela)

== Literature ==
- Juan Abad (1872–1932): Filipino playwright and journalist. (Sampaloc)
- Rosauro Almario (1886–1933): Filipino essayist and journalist. (Tondo)
- Cecilio Apóstol (1877–1938): Filipino poet. (Santa Cruz)
- Francisco Arcellana (1916–2002): Filipino writer and National Artist (Manila)
- Jesús Balmori (1887–1948): Filipino poet. (Ermita)
- Cirilo Bautista (1941–2018): Filipino poet and National Artist. (Sampaloc)
- Lualhati Bautista (1945–2023): Filipina novelist. (Tondo)
- Amelia Lapeña Bonifacio (1930–2020): Filipina playwright, educator and National Artist. (Binondo)
- Fernando María Guerrero (1873–1929): Filipino writer and politician. (Ermita)
- León María Guerrero III (1915–1982): Filipino novelist and diplomat. (Ermita)
- Wilfrido Ma. Guerrero (1911–1995): Filipino playwright and National Artist. (Ermita)
- Amado V. Hernandez (1903–1970): Filipino writer, labor leader and National Artist. (Tondo)
- José Corazón de Jesús (1896–1932): Filipino poet. (Santa Cruz)
- Nick Joaquin (1917–2004): Filipino writer and historian. (Paco)
- Patricio Mariano (1877–1935): Filipino playwright and revolutionary. (Santa Cruz)
- José Palma (1876–1903): Filipino poet. (Tondo)
- Trinidad Pardo de Tavera (1857–1925): Spanish Filipino historian. (Intramuros)
- Iñigo Ed. Regalado (1888–1974): Filipino poet, novelist and journalist. (Sampaloc)
- Severino Reyes (1861–1942): Filipino writer and playwright. (Santa Cruz)
- Alejandro Roces (1924–2011): Filipino author and National Artist. (San Miguel)
- Bienvenido Santos (1911–1996): Filipino American writer. (Tondo)
- Lope K. Santos (1879–1963): Filipino language writer. (Pasig)
- Rolando Tinio (1937–1997): Filipino poet, playwright and National Artist. (Tondo)
- Jose Garcia Villa (1908–1997): Filipino American poet and National Artist. (Malate)

== Media and entertainment ==
- Alvin Anson (1962): Filipino actor and producer. (Metro Manila)
- Bassilyo (1977): Filipino rapper, singer, songwriter and actor. (Marikina)
- Carla Abellana (1986): Filipina actress. (Manila)
- Boots Anson-Roa (1945): Filipina veteran actress. (Manila)
- Jolina Magdangal (1978): Filipina actress, recording artist. (Quezon City)
- Ara Mina (1979): Filipina actress, tv host (Mandaluyong)
- Jo Berry (1994): Filipina dramatic actress. (Manila)
- BB Gandanghari (1967): Filipina actress, model, entertainer, comedian, director. (Metro Manila)
- Mosang (1972): Filipina actress and comedian. (Manila)
- Julio Diaz (1958): veteran actor. (Manila)
- Pinky Amador (1966): Filipina actress, tv host, singer. (Manila)
- Boom Labrusca (1976): Filipino character actor, model. (Manila)
- Perla Bautista (1940): Filipina veteran actress (Manila)
- Jerrold Tarog (1977): Filipino film director. (Manila)
- Tina Paner (1971): Filipina actress, singer. (Manila)
- Mikael Daez (1988): Filipino actor, model and television host. (Manila)
- Joyce Bernal (1968): Filipina film director (Manila)
- Princess Punzalan (1964): Filipina actress, nurse (Manila)
- Gabbi Garcia (1998): Filipina actress. (Makati City)
- Arjo Atayde (1991): Filipino actor. (Quezon City)
- Ria Atayde (1992): Filipina actress. (Mandaluyong)
- Christine Jacob (1967): Filipina newscaster. (Manila)
- Bianca Umali (2000): Filipina actress. (Parañaque)
- Ogie Diaz (1970): Filipino comedian. (Quezon City)
- Romnick Sarmenta (1972): Filipino actor. (Quezon City)
- Dolphy Quizon (1928): Filipino actor. (Metro Manila)
- Janine Gutierrez (1989): Filipina actress. (Quezon City)
- Arnell Ignacio (1964): Filipino actor and host. (Metro Manila)
- Jay Manalo (1973): Filipino-Vietnamese actor and model (Tondo)
- Melizza Jimenez (2000): Filipina actress (Manila)
- Roi Vinzon (1953): Filipino actor and director (Metro Manila)
- Lovi Poe (1989): Filipina singer actress and model. (Quezon City)
- Alex Medina (1986): Filipino actor. (Manila)
- L.J. Reyes (1987): Filipna actress. (Quezon City)
- Albert Martinez (1961): Filipino actor. (Manila)
- Jess Lapid Jr. (1962): Filipino actor and director (Caloocan)
- Agot Isidro (1966): Filipina actress. (Marikina)
- William Martinez (1962): Filipino film actor. (Manila)
- Sheryl Cruz (1974): Filipina actress, opm singer. (Makati)
- Rommel Padilla (1965): Filipino actor. (Manila)
- Bela Padilla (1991): Filipina actress. (Makati)
- Michael De Mesa (1960): Filipino dramatic actor. (Manila)
- Dina Bonnevie (1962): Filipina actress (Quezon City)
- Lani Mercado (1968): Filipina actress. (Manila)
- Jolo Revilla (1988): Filipino actor. (Quezon City)
- Donny Pangilinan (1998): Filipino actor. (Metro Manila)
- Kris Bernal (1989): Filipina actress.(Quezon City)
- Lino Cayetano (1978): Filipino film director. (Taguig)
- Christine Bersola-Babao (1970): Filipina journalist. (Manila)
- Robi Domingo (1989): Filipino TV host. (Quezon City)
- Kitkat (1988): Freelancer comedian. (Manila)
- Dingdong Dantes (1980): Filipino actor. (Quezon City)
- Jolina Magdangal (1978): Filipina momsie TV host. (Quezon City)
- Paolo Contis (1984): Filipino actor. (Manila)
- Rhian Ramos (1990): Filipina actress. (Makati)
- Tonton Gutierrez (1964): Filipino actor. (Manila)
- Toni Rose Gayda (1958): Filipina actress. (Manila)
- Coco Martin (1981): Filipino action actor. (Santa Cruz)
- Janice de Belen (1968): Filipina actress and TV host judge. (Quezon City)
- Herbert Bautista (1968): Filipino actor. (Quezon City)
- Tuesday Vargas (1980): Filipina actress and comedian. (Sampaloc)
- John Estrada (1973): Filipino actor and comedian. (Quezon City)
- Marvin Agustin (1979): Filipino actor and businessman. (Manila)
- Tim Yap (1977): TV showbiz host. (Metro Manila)
- Ciara Sotto (1980): Actress and singer. (Makati)
- Dennis Trillo (1981): Filipino actor and endorser. (Quezon City)
- Paul Salas (1998): Filipino actor. (Quezon City)
- Judy Ann Santos (1978): Filipina actress. (Manila)
- Julia Barretto (1997): Filipina actress. (Marikina)
- Ryan Agoncillo (1979): Filipino actor. (Santa Mesa)
- Sunshine Dizon (1983): Filipina actress. (Quezon City)
- Carlo Aquino (1985): Filipino famous actor, film movie and singer. (Quezon City)
- Tirso Cruz III (1952): Filipino veteran famous actor. (Sampaloc)
- John Prats (1984): Filipino famous actor and TV director. (Manila)
- Daniel Padilla (1995): Filipino famous actor. (Manila)
- Vice Ganda (1976): Filipino famous comedian. (Tondo)
- Donny Pangilinan (1998): Filipino actor, model, singer, host and video jockey
- Joem Bascon (1986): Filipino actor. (Mandaluyong)
- Kim Molina (1991): Filipina actress. (Manila)
- Doris Bigornia (1966): Filipina journalist. (Metro Manila)
- Gardo Versoza (1964): Filipino actor. (Manila)
- Richard Gomez (1966): Filipino actor. (Manila)
- JMKO (1994): Filipino singer. (Manila)
- Joey De Leon (1946): Filipino comedian host. (Binondo)
- Dianne Medina (1986): Filipina showbiz news anchor. (Manila)
- Manny Jacinto (1987): Filipino Canadian actor. (Manila)
- Oyo Boy Sotto (1984): Filipino comedian. (Manila)
- Rory Quintos (1962): Filipino director film, actor. (Manila)
- Panchito Alba (1925–1995): Filipino comedian. (Paco)
- Ishmael Bernal (1938–1996): Filipino film director and National Artist. (Manila)
- Camille Prats (1985): Filipina actress, TV host and comedian. (Manila)
- Dolphy (1928–2012): Filipino comedian. (Tondo)
- Rachel Grant (1977): Filipino British actress. (Parañaque)
- Gerardo de León (1913–1981): Filipino film director and National Artist. (Manila)
- Lisa Macuja-Elizalde (1964): Filipina prima ballerina. (Manila)
- Stella Márquez (1937): Colombian director and beauty queen. (Quezon City)
- Lily Monteverde (1938): Filipina film producer and businesswoman. (Manila)
- José Nepomuceno (1893–1959): Filipino film director and producer. (Manila)
- Fernando Poe Jr. (1939–2004): Filipino actor and National Artist. (Manila)
- Isabel Preysler (1951): Spanish Filipino socialite, model and host. (Manila)
- Roberto Villanueva (1971): Spanish Filipino dancer, choreographer, and producer. (Manila)
- Luchi Cruz-Valdez (1965): Filipina journalist. (Manila)
- McCoy de Leon (1995): Filipino actor and model. (Tondo, Manila)
- Dimples Romana (1984): Filipina actress. (Parañaque)
- Sylvia Sanchez (1971): Filipina actress. (Quezon City)
- Julia Montes (1995): Filipina actress. (Manila)
- Angel Aquino (1973): Filipina actress. (Marikina)
- Andi Eigenmann (1990): Filipina actress and vlogger. (Marikina)
- Dominic Ochoa (1974): Filipino actor. (Parañaque)
- Miles Ocampo (1997): Filipina actress. (Quezon City)
- Daniel Padilla (1995): Filipino actor and singer. (Manila)
- Loisa Andalio (1999): Filipina actress. (Parañaque)
- Ken Chan (1993): Filipino actor. (Parañaque)
- Sue Ramirez (1996): Filipina actress. (Parañaque)
- Bianca Manalo (1987): Filipina actress and pageant titleholder. (Parañaque)
- Angelica Panganiban (1986): Filipina actress. (Quezon City)
- Aiko Melendez (1975): Filipina actress and politician. (Quezon City)
- Iza Calzado (1982): Filipina actress and host. (Quezon City)
- Albie Casiño (1993): Filipino actor. (Makati)
- Heaven Peralejo (1999): Filipina actress. (Makati)
- Francine Diaz (2004): Filipina actress. (Manila)
- Sofia Andres (1998): Filipina actress. (Manila)
- Gina Pareño (1949): Filipina actress. (Manila)
- Gloria Diaz (1951): Filipina actress and pageant titleholder. (Manila)
- Isabelle Daza (1988): Filipina actress and model. (Manila)
- Jo Berry (1994): Filipina actress. (Manila)
- Michelle Dee (1995): Filipina actress and pageant titleholder. (Makati)
- Jericho Rosales (1979): Filipino actor and singer (Quezon City)
- Celeste Cortesi (1997): Filipina actress and pageant titleholder. (Pasay)
- Belle Mariano (2002): Filipina actress. (Pasig)
- Kate Valdez (2000): Filipina actress. (Manila)
- Jillian Ward (2005): Filipina actress. (Manila)
- Mylene Dizon (1976): Filipina actress. (Manila)
- Louise Abuel (2003): Filipino actor. (Manila)
- Andrea Torres (1990): Filipino actress and model. (Manila)
- Mikee Quintos (1997): Filipina singer and actress. (Manila)

== Military ==
- Frederick Walker Castle (1908–1944): U.S. Army general and Medal of Honor recipient. (Taguig)
- Rafael Crame (1863–1927): Filipino constabulary chief. (Malabon)
- George Fleming Davis (1911–1945): US Navy officer and Medal of Honor recipient. (Manila)
- José Olaguer Feliú (1857–1929): Spanish lieutenant general and war minister. (Manila)

== Music ==
- Ariel Rivera (1966): Filipino singer. (Manila)
- Marco Sison (1957): OPM singer. (Manila)
- Aicelle Santos (1985): Filipina singer. (Manila)
- Gian Sotto (1978): Band vocalist. (Quezon City)
- Lindsay Custodio (1978): Filipina OPM singer. (Muntinlupa)
- JM Yosures (1996): Filipino pop OPM singer. (Quezon City)
- L.A. Lopez (1985): OPM singer and composer. (Quezon City)
- Kyla (1981): Filipina Singer. (Manila)
- Erik Santos (1982): Filipino OPM ballad singer, gospel. (Malabon)
- Angeline Quinto (1989): Filipina OPM singer. (Sampaloc)
- Martin Nievera (1962): Filipino American singer. (Manila)
- Kitchie Nadal (1980): Filipina OPM rock singer. (Manila)
- Yael Yuzon (1983): Vocalist of sponge cola band. (Manila)
- Zsa Zsa Padilla (1964): Filipina famous singer, the "divine diva". (Manila)
- Karylle (1981): Filipina singer (Manila)
- Paco Arespacochaga (1971): OPM vocalist. (Manila)
- Marion Aunor (1992): Filipina singer. (Manila)
- G3 Misa (1972): OPM band. (Manila)
- Elise Estrada (1987): Filipina Canadian R&B singer. (Marikina)
- Ramon Jacinto (1945): Filipino singer; guitarist artist, disc jockey and radio TV industry businessman. (Pasay)
- Tina Paner (1971): Filipina opm singer. (Manila)
- Luis Eduardo Aute (1943–2020): Spanish musician. (Manila)
- Danita Paner (1989): Filipina pop rock singer. (Manila)
- Antonio Barretto Morales (1943–2014): Spanish Filipino singer. (Manila)
- Ladislao Bonus (1854–1908): Filipino musician and opera composer. (Pandacan)
- Donna Cruz (1977): Filipina OPM singer. (Manila)
- Ryan Cayabyab (1954): Filipino composer, conductor and National Artist. (Santa Cruz)
- Klarisse De Guzman (1991): Filipina OPM soul diva singer. (Makati)
- Levi Celerio (1910–2002): Filipino composer, lyricist and National Artist. (Tondo)
- Fred Elizalde (1907–1979): Spanish Filipino pianist and composer. (Manila)
- José Maceda (1917–2004): Filipino composer, ethnomusicologist and National Artist. (Manila)
- Antonio Molina (1894–1980): Filipino composer and National Artist. (Quiapo)
- Julio Nakpil (1867–1960): Filipino musician and revolutionary general. (Quiapo)
- Dolores Paterno (1854–1881): Filipina composer. (Santa Cruz)
- Arnel Pineda (1967): Filipino singer and songwriter. (Tondo)
- Atang de la Rama (1902–1991): Filipina singer, actress and National Artist. (Pandacan)
- Josephine Roberto (1977): Filipino American singer. (Pasay)
- Lea Salonga (1971): Filipina singer. (Ermita)
- Ramon Santos (1941): Filipino composer and National Artist. (Pasig)
- Camile Velasco (1985): Filipino American singer. (Makati)
- Andrea Veneracion (1928–2013): Filipina conductor and National Artist. (Manila)
- Hev Abi (2020): Hip Hop Rapper. (QC 1103)
- Al James (2017): Hip Hop Rapper (Manila)
- Celeste Legaspi (1950): Filipina singer (Manila)
- Sarah Geronimo (1988): Filipina singer (Manila)
- Sharon Cuneta (1966): Filipina singer (Pasay)
- Ogie Alcasid (1967): Filipino singer-songwriter (Manila)
- Regine Velasquez (1970): Filipina singer (Tondo, Manila)
- Kean Cipriano (1987): Filipino singer-songwriter, former member of Callalily (Pasig)
- Gelo Rivera (2001): Filipino singer-songwriter, rapper, actor, dancer and the leader of the Filipino boy band BGYO (Pasay)
- Mikki Claver (2002): Filipino singer (Manila)
- Gehlee Dangca (2007): Filipino singer, member of (Unis) (Las Piñas)

== Natural sciences ==
- León María Guerrero (1853–1935): Filipino botanist and patriot. (Ermita)
- Richard F. Heck (1931–2015): American chemist and Nobel Prize winner. (Quezon City)
- Fe del Mundo (1911–2011): Filipina pediatrician and National Scientist. (Intramuros)
- Manuel A. Zamora (1870–1929): Filipino chemist and pharmacist. (Santa Cruz)

== Politics ==
- Benigno Aquino III (1960–2021): 15th president of the Philippines (2010–2016). (Sampaloc)
- Gregorio S. Araneta (1869–1930): Filipino lawyer and Philippine Commission member. (Quiapo)
- Joker Arroyo (1927–2015): Filipino politician and lawyer. (Makati)
- Marcelo Azcárraga Palmero (1832–1915): Spanish prime minister. (Manila)
- Benjamin Abalos Jr. (1962): Filipino politician and lawyer. (Mandaluyong)
- Jejomar Binay (1942): former vice president of the Philippines. (Paco)
- Joaquín Miguel Elizalde (1896–1965): Filipino statesman and International Monetary Fund governor. (Manila)
- Joseph Estrada: 13th president of the Philippines and former mayor of the city of Manila. (Tondo)
- Miguel Lino de Ezpeleta: Spanish Governor-General of the Philippines. (Manila)
- Benito Legarda (1853–1915): Filipino legislator and Philippine Commission member. (Quiapo)
- Bongbong Marcos (1957): 17th president of the Philippines. (Manila)
- Imelda Marcos (1929): former first lady of the Philippines and governor of Metro Manila. (Pandacan)
- Tomás Morató (1887–1965): Spanish politician and businessman. (Quezon City)
- Esperanza Osmeña (1894–1978): former first lady of the Philippines. (San Miguel)
- Pedro Paterno (1857–1911): Filipino prime minister. (Santa Cruz)
- Fidel V. Ramos (1928–2022): 12th president of the Philippines (1992–1998). (Muntinlupa)
- Raul Roco (1941-2005): Filipino former senator and former Secretary of Education (Pasig)
- Teodoro Sandiko (1860–1939): Filipino senator and revolutionary. (Pandacan)
- Mark Leviste (1977): Filipino ex-vice governor of Batangas (Makati)
- Ronald Singson (1968): Filipino Member of the Philippine House of Representatives from Ilocos Sur's 1st congressional district. (Manila)
- Ryan Recto (1996): Filipino congressman politician. (Makati)
- Ronaldo Puno (1948): Filipino politician who has served as the representative for Antipolo's first district since 2025. (Manila)

== Religion ==
- Francisca del Espíritu Santo Fuentes (1647–1711): Spanish religious figure. (Manila)
- Ignacia del Espíritu Santo (1663–1748): Filipina venerable. (Binondo)
- Mariano Gomez (1799–1872): Executed Filipino secular priest. (Santa Cruz)
- José María of Manila (1880–1936): Spanish blessed. (Manila)
- Isabel Larrañaga Ramírez (1836–1899): Spanish venerable. (Manila)
- Vicente Liem de la Paz (1732–1773): Vietnamese saint. (Manila)
- Felix Manalo (1886–1963): Filipino religious leader and founder of Iglesia ni Cristo. (Taguig)
- Darwin Ramos (1994–2012): Filipino candidate to the sainthood. (Pasay)
- Lorenzo Ruiz (1600–1637): Filipino saint. (Binondo)
- Jacinto Zamora (1835–1872): Executed Filipino secular priest. (Pandacan)
- Nicolas Zamora (1875–1914): Filipino religious leader and founder of Iglesia Evangelica Metodista en las Islas Filipinas. (Binondo)

== Social sciences ==
- Carmen Guerrero Nakpil (1922–2018): Filipina historian and journalist. (Ermita)
- Epifanio de los Santos (1871–1928): Filipino historian. (Malabon)

== Sports ==
- Fernando Giménez Álvarez (1925–2013): Spanish Filipino American footballer, sports executive and referee. (Manila)
- Felicisimo Ampon (1920–1997): Filipino tennis player. (Manila)
- EJ Obiena (1995): Filipino track and field. (Tondo)
- Carlos Badion (1935–2002): Filipino basketball player. (Tondo)
- Oliver Barbosa (1986): Filipino chess grandmaster. (Pasig)
- Charles Borck (1917–2008): German Spanish Filipino basketball player. (Quiapo)
- Allan Caidic (1963): Filipino basketball player. (Pasig)
- Dionisio Calvo (1903–1977): Filipino basketball player. (Sampaloc)
- Luisito Espinosa (1967): Filipino boxer. (Tondo)
- Danny Florencio (1947–2018): Filipino basketball player. (Quiapo)
- Andres Franco (1925-2008): Filipino Chinese Spanish high jumper (Tondo)
- Jayson Gonzales (1969): Filipino chess grandmaster. (Quezon City)
- Daniel Guda (1996): Australian badminton player. (Manila)
- Nikko Huelgas (1991): Filipino triathlete. (Las Piñas)
- Samboy Lim (1962): Filipino basketball player. (Manila)
- Carlos Loyzaga (1930–2016): Filipino basketball player. (San Juan)
- Marlon Manalo (1975): Filipino pool player. (Mandaluyong)
- Michael Christian Martinez (1996): Filipino figure skater. (Parañaque)
- Paeng Nepomuceno (1957): Filipino bowler. (Quezon City)
- Ambrosio Padilla (1910–1996): Filipino basketball player and senator. (San Miguel)
- Franz Pumaren (1963): Filipino basketball player and politician. (Quezon City)
- Alberto Reynoso (1940–2011): Filipino basketball player. (Pasig)
- Biboy Rivera (1974): Filipino bowler. (Quezon City)
- Marlon Stöckinger (1991): Filipino racing driver. (Manila)
- Tim Tebow (1987): American football and baseball player. (Makati)
- Eduardo Teus (1896–1958): Filipino Spanish footballer. (Manila)
- Carlos Yulo (2000): Filipino artistic gymnast. (Malate)

== Visual arts ==
- Federico Aguilar Alcuaz (1932–2011): Filipino painter, sculptor and National Artist. (Santa Cruz)
- Fernando Amorsolo (1892–1972): Filipino painter and National Artist. (Paco)
- Antonio Blanco (1912–1999): Indonesian painter. (Ermita)
- Benedicto Cabrera (1942): Filipino painter and National Artist. (Malabon)
- Froilan Calayag (1982-): painter (Bulacan)
- Eduardo Castrillo (1942–2016): Filipino sculptor. (Santa Ana)
- Francisco Coching (1919–1998): Filipino illustrator, writer and National Artist. (Pasig)
- Bonifacio Flores Arevalo (1850–1920): Filipino sculptor and ilustrado. (Quiapo)
- Félix Resurrección Hidalgo (1855–1913): Filipino painter. (Binondo)
- Cesar Legaspi (1917–1994): Filipino painter and National Artist. (Tondo)
- Pelagia Mendoza y Gotianquin (1867–1939): Filipina sculptor. (Pateros)
- Hernando R. Ocampo (1911–1978): Filipino modernist painter and National Artist. (Santa Cruz)
- Alfonso A. Ossorio (1916–1990): Filipino American painter. (Manila)
- Fabián de la Rosa (1869–1937): Filipino painter. (Paco)

== See also ==
- List of people from Caloocan
- List of people from Las Piñas
- List of people from Makati
- List of people from Malabon
- List of people from Mandaluyong
- List of people from Manila
- List of people from Marikina
- List of people from Muntinlupa
- List of people from Navotas
- List of people from Parañaque
- List of people from Pasay
- List of people from Pasig
- List of people from Pateros
- List of people from Quezon City
- List of people from San Juan City
- List of people from Taguig
- List of people from Valenzuela City
