= List of people from Manila =

This list is made up of notable people who were born or live in Manila, the capital of the Philippines.

== National heroes and patriots ==
- Andrés Bonifacio – Filipino nationalist, revolutionary leader and founder of Katipunan
- Gregoria de Jesús – founder and vice-president of the women's chapter of the Katipunan of the Philippines. She was also the custodian of the documents and seal of the Katipunan. Wife of Andrés Bonifacio.
- Jose W. Diokno – Filipino lawyer and nationalist during Martial Law
- Emilio Jacinto – Filipino General during the Philippine Revolution
- Julio Nakpil – Filipino musician, composer and a General during the Philippine Revolution
- Antonio Luna – Filipino pharmacist and general who fought in the Philippine–American War
- José Palma – poet and soldier. He was on the staff of La Independencia at the time he wrote "Filipinas", a patriotic poem in Spanish that is since been the basis for every translation of the lyrics of Philippine National Anthem.
- Jacinto Zamora and Mariano Gomes – Filipino Catholic priests, part of the Gomburza, a trio of priests who were falsely accused of mutiny by the Spanish colonial authorities in the Philippines in the 19th century.
- Teodora Alonso Realonda – mother of José Rizal
- Trinidad Pardo de Tavera – Filipino propagandist, physician, historian and politician
- Macario Sakay – Filipino Revolutionary General
- Francisco Carreón – Filipino Revolutionary General
- Edilberto Evangelista – Filipino Revolutionary General
- Flaviano Yengko – Filipino Revolutionary General
- Licerio Gerónimo – general of the Philippine Revolutionary Forces under Emilio Aguinaldo during Philippine–American War
- Marina Dizon – heroine of the Philippine Revolution and one of the first women initiated into the Katipunan. She also kept important documents for the Katipunan.
- José Dizon – Filipino patriot who was among those who founded the Katipunan that sparked the Philippine Revolution
- Román Ongpin – Filipino-Chinese businessman and philanthropist who aided Filipino revolutionaries against the Spanish and American colonial administration in the Philippine islands.
- Mariano Limjap – Filipino-Chinese businessman and philanthropist who helped in the Philippine Revolution and the Filipino-American War.
- Agueda Esteban – Filipina revolutionary
- Hermenegildo Cruz – writer and trade union organizer. He was a founding member of Unión Obrera Democrática Filipina and a member of the Philippine Assembly. He became Director of the Bureau of Labor in 1924.
- Gregorio S. Araneta – Filipino lawyer, businessman, and nationalist, during the Spanish and American colonial periods.
- Pablo Ocampo – Filipino lawyer, nationalist, a member of the Malolos Congress, first Resident Commissioner from the Philippine Islands to the United States Congress
- Rosa Sevilla – Filipino activist, educator, and journalist who advocated for women's suffrage in the Philippines.
- Concepción Felix – Filipina feminist and human rights activist. She established one of the first women's organizations in the Philippines, Asociación Feminista Filipina, as well as one of the first humanitarian NGOs, La Gota de Leche, aimed specifically at the well-being of mothers and their children. On several occasions, she spoke to legislators to promote women's enfranchisement.
- Benito Legarda – Filipino legislator who was a member of the Philippine Commission of the American colonial Insular Government, the government's legislature, and later a Resident Commissioner from the Philippine Islands to the United States Congress.
- Edgar Jopson – labor rights and student activist, and freedom fighter during the reign of Martial law under Ferdinand Marcos.
- Gaston Z. Ortigas – freedom fighter, agrarian reformer, entrepreneur, and peace advocate best known for his opposition to the Martial Law dictatorship of Ferdinand Marcos,
- Cristina Catalla, Jessica Sales, and Gerry Faustino – anti-martial law activists that were abducted by state security agents and disappeared with seven other activists in what is believed to be the single biggest case of involuntary disappearance during Ferdinand Marcos' martial law in the Philippines that later came to be known as the Southern Tagalog 10.

== National scientists ==
- Fe del Mundo – National Scientist of the Philippines for Pediatrics
- Jose Encarnacion Jr. – National Scientist of the Philippines for Economics
- Alfredo Lagmay – National Scientist of the Philippines for Experimental Psychology
- Benito Vergara - National Scientist of the Philippines for Plant Physiology
- Edgardo Gomez – National Scientist of the Philippines for Marine Biology

== National artists ==
- Ryan Cayabyab – National Artist of the Philippines for Music
- Levi Celerio – National Artist of the Philippines for Music and Literature
- Lucrecia Roces Kasilag – National Artist of the Philippines for Music
- Antonio Molina – National Artist of the Philippines for Music
- Andrea Veneracion – National Artist of the Philippines for Music
- Alice Reyes – National Artist of the Philippines for Dance
- Atang de la Rama – National Artist of the Philippines for Theater
- Wilfrido Ma. Guerrero – National Artist of the Philippines for Theater
- Amelia Lapeña-Bonifacio – National Artist of the Philippines for Theater
- Rolando Tinio – National Artist of the Philippines for Theater and Literature
- Federico Aguilar Alcuaz – National Artist of the Philippines for Visual Arts – Painting, Sculpture and Mixed Media
- Fernando Amorsolo – National Artist of the Philippines for Visual Arts – Painting
- Jose T. Joya – National Artist of the Philippines for Visual Arts – Painting
- Cesar Legaspi – National Artist of the Philippines for Visual Arts – Painting
- Arturo R. Luz – National Artist of the Philippines for Visual Arts – Painting
- Hernando R. Ocampo – National Artist of the Philippines for Visual Arts – Painting
- Ishmael Bernal – National Artist of the Philippines for Film
- Gerardo de León – National Artist of the Philippines for Film
- Fernando Poe Jr. – National Artist of the Philippines for Film
- Francisco Arcellana – National Artist of the Philippines for Literature
- Cirilo Bautista – National Artist of the Philippines for Literature
- Gémino Abad – National Artist of the Philippines for Literature
- Amado V. Hernandez – National Artist of the Philippines for Literature
- Nick Joaquin – National Artist of the Philippines for Literature
- Alejandro Roces – National Artist of the Philippines for Literature
- Jose Garcia Villa – National Artist of the Philippines for Literature
- Carlos Quirino – National Artist of the Philippines for Historical Literature
- Pablo Antonio – National Artist of the Philippines for Architecture
- Francisco Mañosa – National Artist of the Philippines for Architecture
- Juan Nakpil – National Artist of the Philippines for Architecture
- Ramón Valera – National Artist of the Philippines for Architecture, Design and Allied Arts – Fashion Design
- José María Zaragoza – National Artist of the Philippines for Architecture

== Politics and government ==
=== Executive branch and executive departments ===
- Joseph Estrada – 13th President of the Philippines, 9th Vice President of the Philippines, 26th Mayor of Manila, 14th San Juan Mayor, and actor
- Bongbong Marcos – 17th President of the Philippines, former House Representative of the 2nd district of Ilocos Norte, former Governor of Ilocos Norte, and former Philippine senator
- Salvador Laurel – 8th Vice President of the Philippines
- Pedro Paterno – 2nd Prime Minister of the Philippines
- Juan Flavier – 18th Secretary of the Department of Health and former Philippine senator
- Raul Manglapus – 18th Secretary of the Department of the Foreign Affairs and former Philippine senator
- Vicente Paterno – 18th Secretary of the Department of Trade and Industry and former Philippine senator
- Orlando S. Mercado – 20th Secretary of the Department of the Defense and former Philippine senator
- Alfredo S. Lim − 19th Secretary of the Department of the Interior and Local Government, former Philippine senator, 19th Mayor of Manila, and former NBI director
- Lito Atienza – 30th Secretary of the Department of Environment and Natural Resources, 20th Mayor of Manila, Party-list Representative for Buhay
- Solita Monsod – 5th Director-General of the National Economic Development Authority
- Joaquín Miguel Elizalde – 6th Secretary of the Department of the Foreign Affairs
- Albert del Rosario – 24th Secretary of the Department of the Foreign Affairs
- Andrew Gonzalez – 30th Secretary of the Department of the Education
- Florencio Abad – 33rd Secretary of the Department of the Education, 10th Secretary of the Department of the Budget and Management, and 9th Secretary of the Department of Agrarian Reform
- Catalino Macaraig Jr. – 23rd Executive Secretary
- Salvador Medialdea – 38th Executive Secretary
- Ignacio Bunye – former Presidential Spokesperson and Press Secretary, former mayor and first congressman of Muntinlupa
- Florin Hilbay – former Solicitor General of the Philippines
- Alfredo Benipayo – 18th Chairman of the Commission on Elections
- Raymundo Punongbayan – former director of the Philippine Institute of Volcanology and Seismology (PHIVOLCS)
- Esperanza Osmeña – former First Lady of the Philippines
- Imelda Marcos – former First Lady of the Philippines and politician
- Amelita Ramos – former First Lady of the Philippines

=== Legislative branch ===
- José W. Diokno – 32nd Secretary of Justice, 1st Chairman of the Commission on Human Rights, and nationalist senator
- Arturo Tolentino – 12th President of the Senate of the Philippines, 15th Secretary of the Department of Foreign Affairs
- Gil Puyat – 13th President of the Senate of the Philippines
- Manny Villar – 25th President of the Senate of the Philippines, 18th Speaker of the House of Representatives of the Philippines, and businessman
- Tito Sotto – 23rd President of the Senate of the Philippines, former Vice-mayor of Quezon City, actor and comedian
- Rafael Palma – former Philippine senator, 4th President of the University of the Philippines, and writer
- Eva Estrada Kalaw – former Philippine senator
- Ambrosio Padilla – former Philippine senator, Member of the Philippine Constitutional Commission of 1986, and former basketball player
- Macario Peralta Jr. – former Philippine senator, and 13th Secretary of the Department of National Defense
- Pacita Madrigal-Warns – former Philippine senator
- Helena Benitez – former Philippine senator
- Maria Kalaw Katigbak – former Philippine senator
- Butz Aquino – former Philippine senator
- Freddie Webb – former Philippine senator and former professional basketball player
- Nikki Coseteng – former Philippine senator
- Jamby Madrigal – former Philippine senator
- Bam Aquino – former Philippine senator
- Risa Hontiveros – Senator of the Philippines
- Francis Pangilinan – Senator of the Philippines
- Monique Lagdameo – incumbent filipina congresswoman of City Of Makati
- Gerardo Espina Jr. – incumbent congressman
- Vilma Santos – Syjuco former House Representative of the 6th district of Batangas, 22nd Governor of Batangas, and film actress
- Augusto L. Syjuco – House of Representatives of the Philippines and director-general of the Technical Education and Skills Development Authority
- Sarah Elago – activist and House Representative of Kabataan Partylist

=== Judicial branch ===
- Roberto Concepcion – 10th Chief Justice of the Supreme Court of the Philippines, and Member of the Philippine Constitutional Commission of 1986
- Enrique Fernando – 13th Chief Justice of the Supreme Court of the Philippines
- Claudio Teehankee – 16th Chief Justice of the Supreme Court of the Philippines
- Andres Narvasa – 19th Chief Justice of the Supreme Court of the Philippines
- Artemio Panganiban – 21st Chief Justice of the Supreme Court of the Philippines
- Reynato Puno – 22nd Chief Justice of the Supreme Court of the Philippines
- Renato Corona – 23rd Chief Justice of the Supreme Court of the Philippines
- Maria Lourdes Sereno – de facto 24th Chief Justice of the Supreme Court of the Philippines
- Florentino Torres – 3rd Associate Justice of the Supreme Court of the Philippines
- J. B. L. Reyes – 64th Associate Justice of the Supreme Court of the Philippines
- Isagani Cruz – 113th Associate Justice of the Supreme Court of the Philippines
- Florentino P. Feliciano – 115th Associate Justice of the Supreme Court of the Philippines
- Flerida Ruth Pineda-Romero – 125th Associate Justice of the Supreme Court of the Philippines, and Secretary-General of the Philippine Constitutional Commission of 1986.
- Jose Melo – 128th Associate Justice of the Supreme Court of the Philippines, and 20th Chairman of the Commission on Elections
- Bernardo P. Pardo – 142nd Associate Justice of the Supreme Court of the Philippines
- Alicia Austria-Martinez – 149th Associate Justice of the Supreme Court of the Philippines
- Noel Tijam – 176th Associate Justice of the Supreme Court of the Philippines
- Amy Lazaro-Javier – 182nd Associate Justice of the Supreme Court of the Philippines
- Priscilla Baltazar-Padilla – 188th Associate Justice of the Supreme Court of the Philippines
- Natividad Almeda-López – first female lawyer in the Philippines, passing the bar in 1914 and the first woman to defend a woman in a court of law. She was also the first female judge of the municipal court of Manila.

=== Diplomacy ===
- León María Guerrero III – former ambassador, historian, and writer
- Marcial Lichauco – former ambassador, diplomat, and writer
- Narciso G. Reyes – former ambassador, diplomat, former Chairman of UNICEF, and 4th Secretary General of the Association of Southeast Asian Nations

=== Local government ===
- Arsenio Cruz Herrera – first Filipino Mayor of Manila
- Ramon Bagatsing – 17th and the longest-serving Mayor of Manila
- Isko Moreno – 27th Mayor of Manila, former Manila City councilor from the 1st district, actor and vlogger.
- Larry Silva – 21st Vice Mayor of Manila, former Manila City councilor from the 3rd district, actor and comedian
- Carmen Planas – known as "Manila's Darling", was the first woman to be elected to any public offices in the Philippines when she was elected councilor of Manila by general suffrage in 1934. She would later serve as the capital city's first female Vice Mayor from 1940 to 1941 and again from 1946 to 1951.
- Lou Veloso – incumbent Manila City councilor from the 6th district, actor and comedian

=== Military and law enforcement ===
- Basilio Valdes – 3rd Chief of Staff of the Armed Forces of the Philippines, 3rd Secretary of the Department of National Defense, and 2nd Secretary of the Department of Health
- Jesus Vargas – 7th Chief of Staff of the Armed Forces of the Philippines, 11th Secretary of the Department of National Defense
- Alfredo Santos – 11th Chief of Staff of the Armed Forces of the Philippines
- Manuel Yan – 16th Chief of Staff of the Armed Forces of the Philippines, and 17th Secretary of the Department of the Foreign Affairs
- Angelo Reyes – 28th Chief of Staff of the Armed Forces of the Philippines, 21st Secretary of the Department of National Defense, 21st Secretary of the Department of Interior and Local Government, 29th Secretary of the Department of Environment and Natural Resources, and 10th Secretary of the Department of Energy
- Gregorio Pio Catapang – 45th Chief of Staff of the Armed Forces of the Philippines
- Rogelio Morales – former Navy captain, master mariner, educator, and activist during the reign of Martial law under Ferdinand Marcos.
- Antonio Taguba – retired United States Army major general and second American citizen of Philippine birth to be promoted to general officer rank in the United States Army.
- George Fleming Davis – US Navy officer and Medal of Honor recipient.
- Antonio C. Torres – first Filipino Chief of Police of the Manila Police Department, founder and first Supreme Commander of the Order of the Knights of Rizal

== Religion ==
- Lorenzo Ruiz – first Catholic Filipino saint
- José María of Manila – Spanish-Filipino Roman Catholic blessed, and was priest of the Order of Friars Minor Capuchin. He was martyred in the early phase of the Spanish Civil War, and is the third Filipino to have been declared blessed by the Roman Catholic Church.
- Ignacia del Espíritu Santo – Catholic Venerable, founder the Congregation of the Sisters of the Religious of the Virgin Mary, the first native Filipino female congregation with approved pontifical status in what is now the Republic of the Philippines.
- Francisca del Espíritu Santo Fuentes – Catholic Venerable, first Prioress of the Dominican Sisters of Saint Catherine of Siena in the Philippines.
- Isabel Larrañaga Ramírez – Catholic Venerable, Spanish-Filipina nun and foundress who is venerated in the Roman Catholic Church.
- Joaquina Maria Mercedes Barcelo Pages – Catholic Venerable, Spanish Augustinian nun who cofounded the Augustinian Sisters of Our Lady of Consolation
- Rolando Joven Tria Tirona OCD – D.D., Archbishop of the Archdiocese of Caceres and Bishop Emeritus of Prelature of Infanta and Diocese of Malolos
- Diosdado Talamayan – Roman Catholic archbishop. Former auxiliary bishop and second archbishop of the Archdiocese of Tuguegarao.
- Mylo Hubert Vergara – 2nd Bishop of the Diocese of Pasig, 3rd Bishop of San Jose from February 12, 2005 to April 20, 2011.
- Federico O. Escaler, S.J. – Roman Catholic Bishop of the Diocese of Kidapawan and the Diocese of Ipil
- Nicolás Zamora – founder of the first indigenous evangelical church in the Philippines, known as Iglesia Evangelica Metodista en las Islas Filipinas. Zamora is also recognized as the first Filipino Protestant minister in the Philippines.
- Dionisio Deista Alejandro – first Filipino Bishop of the Methodist Church, elected in 1944.
- Jose C. Abriol – Filipino Catholic priest, linguist, and high official in the church in the Philippines. He was the first to translate the Catholic Bible into Tagalog, the native language for most Filipinos.
- Roque Ferriols, S.J. – Filipino Jesuit philosopher known for pioneering the use of Tagalog in philosophizing.
- Mary Therese Vicente – Filipino Roman Catholic nun, foundress of the Sisters of the Holy Face of Jesus of Perpetual Adoration
- Mary Christine Tan – Filipino missionary, nun, and activist, who was known to be one of the key figures who was against the human rights abuses during the Martial law era. She headed the Association of Major Religious Superiors of Women (AMRSP) from 1973–1976, a group of religious sisters who not only vocalized their disdain against the Martial Law dictatorship of Ferdinand Marcos, but also managed to help Filipinos who are suffering from poverty. Member of the Philippine Constitutional Commission of 1986.

== Literature ==
- José de la Cruz – "Hari ng Makatang Tagalog"
- Patricio Mariano – nationalist, revolutionary, pundit, poet, playwright, dramatist, short story writer, novelist, journalist, violinist, and painter
- Severino Reyes – writer, playwright, and director of plays, "Father of the Tagalog Zarzuela"
- Juan Abad – playwright and journalist
- Fernando María Guerrero – poet
- Cecilio Apóstol – poet
- Jesús Balmori – Filipino Spanish language journalist, playwright, and poet.
- Faustino Aguilar – pioneering Filipino social realist novelist, journalist, revolutionary, union leader, and editor
- Alberto Segismundo Cruz – poet and novelist
- Iñigo Ed. Regalado – poet, journalist, and novelist
- Iñigo C. Regalado – poet and novelist
- Rosauro Almario – writer
- José Corazón de Jesús – Tagalog poet, King of the Balagtasan
- Genoveva Matute – author
- Carmen Guerrero Nakpil – journalist, author, historian and public servant
- Bienvenido Santos – Filipino-American fiction, poetry and nonfiction writer
- Gilda Cordero-Fernando – writer and publisher
- Clodualdo del Mundo Sr. – novelist, playwright, essayist, short story writer, journalist, screenwriter, teacher, critic
- Virginia R. Moreno – writer and playwright
- Pablo S. Gomez – komiks writer, screenwriter and director
- E. San Juan Jr. – literary critic
- Teo Antonio – poet
- Lualhati Bautista – novelist, film and television screenwriter
- Jessica Hagedorn – playwright, writer, poet, multimedia performance artist
- Loizza Aquino – writer, mental health activist, and founder of Peace of Mind Canada and co-founder of Student Mental Health Canada

== Visual arts ==
- Marcel Antonio – painter
- Elmer Borlongan – painter
- Eduardo Castrillo – sculptor
- Roberto Chabet – conceptual artist and architect
- Froilan Calayag – painter
- Fabián de la Rosa – painter
- Camille Dela Rosa – painter and former child star
- Damián Domingo – painter
- Brenda Fajardo – artist and printmaker
- Paco Gorospe – painter
- Graciano Nepomuceno – sculptor
- Félix Resurrección Hidalgo – artist
- Nestor Leynes – hyperrealistic painter
- Anita Magsaysay-Ho – painter
- José Honorato Lozano – painter
- Malang – cartoonist, illustrator, and fine arts painter
- Onib Olmedo – painter
- Alfonso A. Ossorio – Filipino–American abstract expressionist artist
- Fernando Sena – painter
- Tony Velasquez – Filipino illustrator regarded as the Father of Tagalog comics and as the pioneer and founding father of the Philippine comics industry. He was the creator of Kenkoy, an "iconic Philippine comic strip character".
- Fernando Zóbel de Ayala y Montojo – Spanish–Filipino painter, businessman, art collector.
- Kenneth Kit Lamug - filmmaker and writer

== Architecture ==
- Carlos Arguelles – architect
- Arcadio Arellano – architect
- Juan M. Arellano – architect
- Tomás Mapúa – architect
- Carlos A. Santos-Viola – architect

== Sciences and education ==
- Anacleto del Rosario – chemist, "Father of Philippine Science and Laboratory"
- León María Guerrero – Filipino writer, revolutionary leader, politician, the first licensed pharmacist in the Philippines, and one of the most eminent botanists in the country in his time.
- Manuel A. Zamora – Filipino chemist and pharmacist best known for his discovery of the tiki-tiki formula against beriberi.
- Manuel S. Guerrero – medical doctor who studied beriberi in infants in the Philippines.
- Proceso Gabriel – Filipino physician and bacteriologist known for establishing the first privately owned bacteriological laboratory in the Philippines.
- Renato Constantino – nationalist historian
- Ricardo Manapat – scholar, writer, researcher, and author of Some Are Smarter Than Others: The History of Marcos' Crony Capitalism", a work on anti-cronyism exposing the wealth of the Marcos dynasty.
- Lydia Yu-Jose – professor of political science and Japanese Studies at the Ateneo de Manila University best known for her research into the history of Japan–Philippines relations, as well as aiding in the development of Japanese studies in the Philippines as a separate academic discipline.
- Jaime C. Bulatao, S.J. – Filipino Jesuit priest and psychologist.
- Armand Mijares – Filipino archaeologist
- Librada Avelino and Carmen de Luna – Filipina educators and founders of Centro Escolar University.
- Onofre R. Pagsanghan – educator, screenplay writer
- Don Moon – President of Shimer College

== Performing arts and entertainment ==
=== Music ===
- Joey Albert - OPM singer
- Ladislao Bonus – "Father of the Filipino opera".
- Dolores Paterno – Filipina composer known for the song "La Flor de Manila" (also known as "Sampaguita").
- Elmo Magalona - rmb singer
- Saab Magalona - singer
- Janno Gibbs - singer
- Francisco Santiago – musician, sometimes called The Father of Kundiman Art Song.
- Lea Salonga – film actress, singer
- Basil Valdez – singer, gospel inspiring song and composer
- Lilet – singer
- Sharon Cuneta – singer
- Rico J. Puno – singer
- Bituin Escalante – singer
- Raymond Lauchengco – singer
- Martin Nievera – singer
- Ariel Rivera – singer
- Louie Ocampo – composer and arranger
- Mel Villena – arranger
- Arnel Pineda – lead singer of the American rock band Journey since 2008
- Gary Valenciano – singer-songwriter, gospel musician, actor, host and musical director
- Francis Magalona – singer and rapper
- Rox Santos – songwriter
- Billy Crawford – singer
- Lolita Carbon – singer and guitarist, member of ASIN
- Wally Gonzalez – guitarist and member of Juan de la Cruz Band
- Chito Miranda – singer-songwriter, and lead vocalist for the band Parokya ni Edgar.
- Sarah Geronimo – film actress, host, television actress, brand ambassador and singer
- Angeline Quinto – film and television actress, singer and host
- Sam Concepcion – film and television actor, singer, host, dancer and VJ
- Cris Villonco – singer
- Jay-R Siaboc – singer
- Mica Javier – singer
- Maiko Nakamura – RNB singer and record producer based in Tokyo, Japan
- Zsa Zsa Padilla – singer
- Karylle – singer
- Chanty – film actress, television actress, singer and member of Lapillus
- Idris Vicuña aka Eyedress – singer-songwriter
- Jaya Ramsey – singer
- Lani Misalucha – singer and composer
- Junior – late singer
- Danita Paner – pop rock
- Marco Sison – opm singer
- Jonathan Manalo – songwriter
- Kyla – singer
- Regine Velasquez – singer and actress
- Katrina Velarde – singer

=== Dance ===
- Lisa Macuja-Elizalde – first Filipina Prima Ballerina
- Roberto Villanueva – dancer, choreographer, and producer.
- Jopay Paguia – dancer, original member of the SexBomb Girls

=== Film and television ===
- José Nepomuceno – one of the pioneering directors and producers of Philippine cinema. Known as the "Father of Philippine movies", he produced and directed the first Filipino silent film entitled Dalagang Bukid in 1919.
- Jo Berry – telenovela actress
- Etang Discher – classical comedienne, actress
- Ayen Munji-Laurel – actress, singer
- Raymond Bagatsing – actor
- Perla Bautista – veteran actress
- Albert Martinez – actor
- Tita Duran – actress
- Iñigo Pascual – actor
- Manilyn Reynes – actress
- William Martinez – actor
- JM De Guzman - actor, singer
- Kevin Santos – actor
- JC Tiuseco – model, actor
- Mel Martinez – actor
- Onemig Bondoc – actor
- Liezl Martinez – actress
- Vilma Santos Recto – actress and singer
- Dolphy – actor and comedian
- Claudine Barretto – actress
- Panchito Alba – actor and comedian
- Chicháy – comedienne and actress
- Cachupoy – actor and comedian
- Dely Atay-Atayan – comedienne and singer
- Babalu – actor and comedian
- Mila del Sol – film actress
- Bella Flores – film actress
- Tony Santos Sr. – film and television actor
- Gretchen Barretto – actress and socialite
- Berting Labra – film and television actor
- Kathleen Hermosa – actress
- Max Alvarado – film and television actor
- Mona Lisa – film actress
- German Moreno – television host and comedian
- Miko Sotto – actor and matinee idol
- Gloria Romero – film and television actress
- Luis Gonzales – film and television actor
- Armando Goyena – film and television actor
- Rosa Rosal – film actress
- Charito Solis – film actress
- Alicia Vergel – film and television actress
- Boots Anson-Roa – film and television actress, columnist, editor, and lecturer
- Rosemarie Gil – film actress
- Eddie Mesa – actor and singer
- Ricky Davao – actor
- Roi Vinzon – actor
- Rita Avila – actress
- Al Tantay – actor, comedian
- Carmi Martin – actress, interior designer
- Miggs Cuaderno – actor, model
- Dolly de Leon – actress
- Mat Ranillo III – former actor
- Camille Prats – comedian, actress
- Sid Lucero – actor
- Judy Ann Santos – actress, chef and businesswoman
- Jomari Yllana – actor, promoter
- Kiko Estrada – actor
- Matet De Leon – actress
- Ate Gay – comedian
- Angelu De Leon – actress
- Tito Sotto – actor
- Bianca Gonzales – host
- Randy Santiago – actor, comedian
- Gloria Diaz – veteran actress, former beauty queen
- Amy Austria – actress
- Mikael Daez – actor, tv host
- Eugene Domingo – actress, comedian
- Isko Moreno – actor, tv personality host
- Gina Alajar – veteran actress, film director
- Isabelle Daza – actress
- Oyo Boy Sotto – actor
- Frank Lloyd Mamaril – director producer
- John Prats – actor, director producer
- Lily Monteverde – film producer
- Sunshine Cruz – actress
- Joel Lamangan – film director
- Rosanna Roces – actress
- Joey Gosiengfiao – film director
- Daniel Padilla – actor
- Renz Fernandez – actor
- Gretchen Barretto – socialite, actress
- Robert Arevalo – actor and director
- Tina Paner– actress
- Piolo Pascual – actor
- Katya Santos – actress
- RK Bagatsing – actor
- Danny Zialcita – film director
- Mike De Leon – film director
- Ruffa Gutierrez – actress
- Tonton Gutierrez – actor
- Maryo J. de los Reyes – film and television director
- Soxie Topacio – film and actor, and director
- Tanya Garcia – actress
- Gina Alajar – actress and television director
- Rory Quintos – film and television director
- Wenn V. Deramas – film and television director
- Auraeus Solito – film director
- Gino M. Santos – film director
- KC Concepcion – actress
- Tirso Cruz III – film and television actor
- Gina Pareño – film and television actress
- Bomber Moran – film and television actor
- Bernardo Bernardo – stage actor, comedian, and film director
- Maricel Soriano – film actress
- Jay Ilagan – film and television actor
- Sandy Andolong – film and television actress
- Alfie Anido – film actor
- Subas Herrero – stage and film actor, comedian
- Joonee Gamboa – actor
- Johnny Delgado – film and television actor
- Vic Sotto – actor and comedian
- Helen Gamboa – veteran actress
- Joey de Leon – actor, comedian, and television host
- Michael De Mesa – film and television actor
- Mark Gil – film and television actor
- Cherie Gil – film and television actress
- Rene Requiestas – actor and comedian
- Richie D'Horsie – actor and comedian
- Cherry Pie Picache – film and television actress
- Coney Reyes – film and television actress
- Pen Medina – actor
- Niño Muhlach – film and television actor
- Cesar Montano – actor
- Aga Muhlach – film and television actor
- Chin Chin Gutierrez – film and television actress and environmentalist
- Snooky Serna – film actress
- Eula Valdez – actress
- Matet De Leon – actress
- Eugene Domingo – film and television actress
- Isabelle Daza – actress
- Keempee de Leon – actor
- Heart Evangelista – actress and socialite
- Nonie Buencamino – actor
- Bodjie Pascua – actor, teacher
- Michael V. – actor and comedian
- John Lapus – comedian
- Paolo Contis – actor
- Mark Anthony Fernandez – actor
- Camille Prats – actress
- Jacob Benedicto – actor and singer
- Jojo Alejar – actor and comedian
- Karylle – actress
- Piolo Pascual – actor
- Ara Mina – film and television actress, fashion model and singer
- Desiree Del Valle – actress
- Adrian Alandy – actor
- Boom Labrusca – actor
- DJ Durano – actor
- Jose Manalo – tv host; comedian
- Raymart Santiago – actor
- Andrea Torres – film and television actress, host and commercial model
- Kate Valdez – film and television actress and model
- Pia Guanio – actress
- Beverly Vergel – film actress, director, producer, ramp model and public speaker
- Mikee Quintos – film and television actress and singer
- Mylene Dizon – dramatic actress
- Polo Ravales – film and television actor and fashion model
- Marvin Agustin – film and television actor
- Yayo Aguila – actress
- Irma Adlawan – actress and queen of indie film
- Maxene Magalona – actress
- Bea Nicolas – film and television actress
- Valerie Concepcion – actress
- Francine Diaz – actress
- Vice Ganda – film and television actor, comedian, host
- Coco Martin – actor
- Julia Montes – film and television actress, host and model
- Matt Evans – actor
- JC de Vera – actor
- JM De Guzman – actor
- Manny Jacinto – actor
- Zaijan Jaranilla – actor
- Arjo Atayde – actor
- Sofia Andres – actress
- McCoy de Leon – actor
- Heaven Peralejo – film, television actress and painter
- Joaquin Domagoso – actor and model
- Joyce Pring – actress
- Donita Nose – comedian
- Cogie Domingo – actor
- Franco Hernandez – television personality
- Chariz Solomon – actress, tv host personality
- Zoren Legaspi – actor
- Kier Legaspi – actor
- Dawn Zulueta – actress
- Jillian Ward – actress
- Louise Abuel – actor

== Journalism and media ==
- Armando Malay – journalist, scholar, and activist during the Marcos administration.
- Gus Abelgas – host and journalist
- Kim Atienza – television host, actor, and weather anchor
- Inday Badiday – host and journalist
- Louie Beltran – broadcast journalist and newspaper columnist
- Teodoro Benigno – Journalist, writer
- Jeff Canoy – field reporter, journalist
- Angelo Castro Jr. – broadcast journalist
- Luchi Cruz-Valdez – journalist
- Arnold Clavio – television host
- Karen Davila – broadcast journalist
- James Deakin – TV show host and columnist
- Mike Enriquez – TV and radio newscaster
- Jove Francisco – broadcast journalist
- Betty Go-Belmonte – journalist, newspaper publisher, co-founder of Philippine Daily Inquirer, The Philippine STAR and Pilipino Star Ngayon
- Bianca Gonzales – television host
- June Keithley – broadcast journalist
- Rico Hizon – broadcast journalist
- Pia Hontiveros – broadcast journalist
- Vicky Morales – TV newscaster
- Tina Monzon-Palma – broadcast journalist
- Dong Puno – former television public affairs host, media executive, newspaper columnist, and lawyer
- Maria Ressa – Filipino-American journalist and author, co-founder and CEO of Rappler, and the first Filipino Nobel Prize laureate.
- Joaquin "Chino" Roces – nationalist, newspaper publisher, and freedom fighter during the reign of Martial law under Ferdinand Marcos.
- Abraham Sarmiento Jr. – Filipino student journalist who gained prominence as an early and visible critic of the martial law government of President Ferdinand Marcos. editor-in-chief of the Philippine Collegian.
- Howie Severino – broadcast journalist and documentarist
- Lolit Solis – talk show host, entertainment news writer, and talent manager
- Max Soliven – journalist, newspaper publisher, activist, television host, co-founder of the Philippine Star
- Jose Mari Velez – TV newscaster, lawyer, journalist, business executive, and activist
- Isagani Yambot – former publisher of the Philippine Daily Inquirer
- Mon Gualvez - tv journalist

== Business ==
- Jorge L. Araneta – CEO, Chairman, and President of The Araneta Group
- Felipe Gozon – Chairman and CEO of GMA Network, Inc.
- Mark López – Chairman and CEO of ABS-CBN Corporation
- Roberto Ongpin – Chairman, CEO, and Director of Alphaland Corporation
- Manuel V. Pangilinan – owner of Philippine Long Distance Telephone Company, Metro Pacific Investments Corporation, TV5 and Philex Mining
- Enrique K. Razon – billionaire and the chairman and CEO of the International Container Terminal Services, Inc. (ICTSI), Chairman of Bloomberry Resorts Corp. (BRC), developer of Solaire Resort and Casino
- Andrés Soriano Sr. – Spanish Filipino industrialist and philanthropist
- Henry Sy – owner of SM Investments Corporation, SM Prime Holdings, SM Development Corporation and Highlands Prime Holdings, Banco de Oro and Chinabank
- Andrew Tan – owner of Alliance Global Group, Megaworld Corporation and Golden Arches Development Corporation
- George Ty – owner of Metropolitan Bank and Trust Company
- Emilio Yap – Chinese Filipino business tycoon. He was the chairman of the board of the Manila Bulletin.
- Alfonso Yuchengco – headed the Yuchengco Group of Companies, one of the largest family-owned business conglomerates in the Philippines.
- Fernando Zobel de Ayala – businessman, president and chief executive officer of Ayala Corporation

== Culinary arts ==
- Cristeta Comerford – Filipino-American chef who has been the White House Executive Chef since 2005. She is the first woman and first person of Asian origin to hold the post.
- Ma Mon Luk – Chinese restaurateur.

== Fashion ==
- Brent Chua – fashion model and photographer
- Pitoy Moreno – fashion designer
- Josie Natori – Filipino American fashion designer
- Ricky Reyes – hairdresser
- Kermit Tesoro – accessories and fashion designer
- Joey Mead King – fashion lifestyle host, runway coach and is the model mentor/co-judge on popular reality show, Asia's Next Top Model cycles two and three

== Pageants ==
- Gemma Cruz-Araneta – writer, director, and beauty queen who won Miss International 1964, becoming the first Filipino and Asian to win the title.
- Maria Teresa Carlson – Binibining Pilipinas–Young 1979 and film actress
- Bianca Manalo – Miss Universe – Philippines 2009, film and television actress and host
- Margarita Moran – Miss Universe 1973
- Joanne Quintas – Binibining Pilipinas – Universe 1995 and Miss Tourism International (Macau Version) 1997
- Daisy Reyes – Binibining Pilipinas – World 1996, film and television actress, singer, TV host, politician and businesswoman

== Sports ==
- Bong Coo – bowler player
- EJ Obiena – track and field
- Mikee Cojuangco-Jaworski – equestrian
- Hector Calma – basketball player
- Dionisio Calvo – swimmer
- Monsour del Rosario – martial artist, actor, producer and politician
- Luisito Espinosa – boxer
- Jasmin Figueroa – archer
- Danny Florencio – basketball player
- Zema Ion – professional wrestler
- Christine Jacob – swimmer
- Lim Eng Beng – basketball player
- Charlie Kendall – American football player
- Samboy Lim – basketball player
- Carlos Loyzaga – basketball player
- Joey Loyzaga - basketball player
- Chito Loyzaga – basketball player
- Miguel Mendoza – swimmer
- Frankie Miñoza – golfer
- Paeng Nepomuceno – bowler
- Benjie Paras – basketball player
- Efren Reyes – pool player and actor
- Jennifer Rosales – swimmer
- Jason Sabio – footballer
- Marlon Stöckinger – race car driver
- Tim Tebow – former American football and baseball player
- Yannick Tuason – footballer
- Carlos Yulo – gymnast
- Bianca Bustamante - race car driver

== Other ==
- Trixie Cruz-Angeles – lawyer, vlogger
- Freddie M. Garcia – co founder of Star Magic
- Fe del Mundo – pediatrics; co founder of José R. Reyes Memorial Medical Center's
- Wilbert Tolentino – entrepreneur, restaurateur, philanthropist and a vlogger
- Wilma V. Galvante – content consultant.

== See also ==
- List of people from Metro Manila
