= List of people from Quezon City =

This list is made up of notable people born or residing in Quezon City, Philippines.

== National heroes and patriots ==
- Melchora Aquino – Filipina revolutionary known as the "Grand Woman of the Revolution" and the "Mother of Balintawak" for her contributions.
- Sen. Benigno Aquino Jr. – former Philippine senator and opposition leader during Martial Law dictatorship of Ferdinand Marcos

== Politics and government ==
- Corazon Aquino – 11th President of the Philippines
- Gloria Macapagal Arroyo – 14th President of the Philippines, 25th Speaker of the House of Representatives of the Philippines
- Benigno Aquino III – 15th President of the Philippines
- Tito Sotto – 23rd President of the Senate of the Philippines, former vice-mayor of Quezon City, actor and comedian
- Jose W. Diokno – 32nd Secretary of the Department of Justice, founding chairman of the Commission on Human Rights and former Philippine senator
- Orlando S. Mercado – 20th Secretary of the Department of the Defense and former Philippine senator
- Mar Roxas– 24th Secretary of the Interior and Local Government, 38th Secretary of the Department of Transportation and Communications, 26th Secretary of the Department of Trade and Industry, and former Philippine senator
- Miriam Defensor Santiago – former Philippine senator
- Nikki Coseteng – former Philippine senator
- Ricardo Rosario – 189th Associate Justice of the Supreme Court of the Philippines
- Ramon Guico III - 31st Governor of Pangasinan
- Cecilia Muñoz-Palma – Filipino jurist and the first woman Associate Justice of the Supreme Court of the Philippines, member and chairperson of Philippine Constitutional Commission of 1986
- Alfredo Benjamin Caguioa – 177th Associate Justice of the Supreme Court of the Philippines
- Martin Villarama Jr. – 166th Associate Justice of the Supreme Court of the Philippines
- Midas Marquez – 192nd Associate Justice of the Supreme Court of the Philippines
- Paquito Ochoa Jr. – 37th Executive Secretary of the Philippines, and former Quezon City Administrator
- Rob Bonta – 34th Attorney General of California
- Mel Mathay – 3rd Chairman of the Metropolitan Manila Authority, and 8th Mayor of Quezon City
- Karina Constantino David – former chairperson of the Housing and Urban Development Coordinating Council and Civil Service Commission
- Maris Diokno – historian and former chairperson of National Historical Commission of the Philippines
- Manuel Morato – former chairperson of the Movie and Television Review and Classification Board and the Philippine Charity Sweepstakes Office.
- Romulo Neri – 11th Director-General of the National Economic and Development Authority
- Mike Defensor – 28th Secretary of the Department Environment and Natural Resources, former chairperson of the Housing and Urban Development Coordinating Council, and House Representative for ANAKALUSUGAN party-list
- Feliciano Belmonte Jr. – 20th & 23rd Speaker of the House of Representatives of the Philippines, and 9th Mayor of Quezon City
- Barry Gutierrez – former House Representative for Akbayan, and former vice presidential spokesperson for Leni Robredo (2016–2022).
- Precious Hipolito – House Representative for the 2nd District of Quezon City
- Alfred Vargas – House Representative for Quezon City's 5th district, film and television actor
- Vincent Crisologo – former House Representative for Quezon City's 1st district
- Tingting Cojuangco – former Governor of Tarlac
- Herbert Bautista – 10th Mayor of Quezon City, film and television actor
- Kit Belmonte – former House Representative for Quezon City's 6th district
- Joy Belmonte – 11th Mayor of Quezon City
- Emmanuel Bautista – 44th Chief of Staff of the Armed Forces of the Philippines

== Literature and the arts ==
- Napoleon Abueva– National Artist of the Philippines for Visual Arts – Sculpture
- Ryan Cayabyab – National Artist of the Philippines for Music
- Jovita Fuentes – National Artist of the Philippines for Music
- Francisco Arcellana – National Artist of the Philippines for Literature
- Wilfrido Ma. Guerrero -National Artist of the Philippines for Theater
- Amelia Lapeña-Bonifacio – National Artist of the Philippines for Theater
- Marilou Diaz-Abaya – National Artist of the Philippines for Film
- Augusto Arbizo – visual artist, and art curator
- Simkin de Pio – visual artist
- Rene Villanueva – playwright and author.
- Eric Gamalinda– poet and novelist
- Lourd de Veyra – poet, musician, emcee, poet, journalist, TV host, and broadcast personality
- Ben Feleo – film director, screenwriter
- Khavn De La Cruz – poet and filmmaker

== Sciences and education ==
- Bienvenido Nebres, S.J. – National Scientist of the Philippines for Mathematics, 29th President of the Ateneo de Manila University,
- Joaquin Bernas, S.J. – 28th President of the Ateneo de Manila University, member of the Philippine Constitutional Commission of 1986
- Francisco Nemenzo Jr. – 18th President of the University of the Philippines
- Fidel Nemenzo – 11th Chancellor of the University of the Philippines Diliman
- Randy David – sociologist
- Renato Constantino – historian
- Elena Rivera Mirano – academic in art studies, and music scholar

== Journalism and media ==
- Betty Go-Belmonte – journalist, newspaper publisher, co-founder of Philippine Daily Inquirer, The Philippine STAR and Pilipino Star Ngayon
- Chit Estella – journalist and professor known for having been instrumental in the founding of the Philippine Center for Investigative Journalism and of Vera Files
- Ed Lingao – journalist, newscaster (resident only)
- Dyan Castillejo - sports reporter, journalist
- Cheche Lazaro – broadcast journalist and the founding President of Probe Productions Inc.
- Ogie Diaz – reporter and local showbiz vlogger
- Kara David – journalist and television host
- Atom Araullo – journalist and television host
- Mariz Umali – television news anchor and journalist (resident only)
- Bernadette Sembrano – television news anchor and journalist
- Raffy Tima – journalist, producer and TV presenter (resident only)
- Cory Quirino – radio and television host

== Entertainment ==
- Alden Richards – actor and singer
- AJ Muhlach – singer, dancer and actor
- Caprice Cayetano – actress
- Jestoni Alarcon – action star actor, ex vice governor of Rizal Province
- Julie Anne San Jose – OPM singer
- Rita Daniela – actress
- Bayani Agbayani – actor, comedian and OPM singer
- Jennica Garcia – actress
- Julian Trono – actor
- Joshua Dionisio – actor
- Dennis Trillo – actor, Sparkle GMA Artist Center starlet
- Vice Ganda – actor, entrepreneur, comedian and tv host presenter (residency only)
- Michelle Madrigal – former actress; starred Chantal Gonzales in Temptation of Wife Philippines Adaptation
- Patricia Tumulak – actress
- Martin Escudero – actor
- Janine Gutierrez – actress
- Mayton Eugenio – actress, dj local movies
- Gian Sotto – band vocalist
- Angelica Panganiban – actress
- Johnny Delgado – film and television actor
- John Arcilla – film and television actor
- Neri Naig – actress
- Shaina Magdayao – actress
- Dingdong Dantes – actor and TV host
- Jericho Rosales – actor, businessman
- Lovi Poe – actress
- Carlo Aquino – film actor, and singer
- Kris Aquino – film and socialite, television actress, and television show host
- Harlene Bautista – former child star, film and television actress
- Ramon Bautista – actor, comedian, television host, film producer, writer, commercial model, and educator.
- Jelo The Weirdo – rapper
- JM Yosures – singer
- Mich Dulce – Filipina fashion designer
- Janice De Belen – actress (residency only)
- Kris Bernal – actress
- Jolo Revilla – actor and politician
- Arjo Atayde – film and television actor (residency only)
- Gelli de Belen – television host and actress (filipino canadian)
- Dina Bonnevie – movie actress
- Niana Guerrero – content creator
- Gee-Ann Abrahan – actress
- Robi Domingo – VJ, actor, dancer, host
- Carolyn Fe – singer and actress
- Johan Santos – actor, television presenter
- Nova Villa – veteran actress, comedian
- John Estrada – actor
- John Lapus – actor, comedian
- Sunshine Dizon – actress
- Amy Perez – veteran actress and tv host
- L.A. Lopez – singer
- Miles Ocampo – actress
- Krista Ranillo – former actress
- Iza Calzado – actress
- Sylvia Sanchez – actress
- Aiko Melendez – actress and politician
- Angelika Dela Cruz – singer, politician and actress
- Kim Domingo - singer and actress
- Carmina Villarroel – actress, tv presenter (residency only)
- Maki – singer

== Sports ==
- Henry Brauner – footballer
- Alex Eala – tennis player
- Michele Gumabao – volleyball player
- Francis Ceccarelli – alpine skier
- Jovy Marcelo – race car driver who was killed in an accident during practice for the 1992 Indianapolis 500.
- Miguel Molina – former swimmer
- Kobe Paras – champion basketball player
- Jai Reyes – basketball player
- Chot Reyes – basketball coach
- Denice Zamboanga – mixed martial arts artist

== Beauty queens ==
- Charlene Gonzales – former beauty queen; Miss Universe 1994
- Nicole Kim Donesa – former beauty queen; Miss World Philippines 2014

== Other ==
- Jake Tordesillas – screenwriter
- Jopet Sison – lawyer, tv personality host

== See also ==
- List of people from Metro Manila
