= Manuel Zamora =

Manuel Zamora may refer to:

- Manuel E. Zamora (born 1950), Filipino politician
- Manuel G. Zamora Sr. (1903–1970s), Filipino government official who served as Malacañang protocol officer; father of Ronaldo and Manuel Jr.
- Manuel B. Zamora Jr. (born 1942), businessman, founder of Nickel Asia Corporation
- Manuel A. Zamora (1870–1929), Filipino chemist and pharmacist
