= List of people from Taguig =

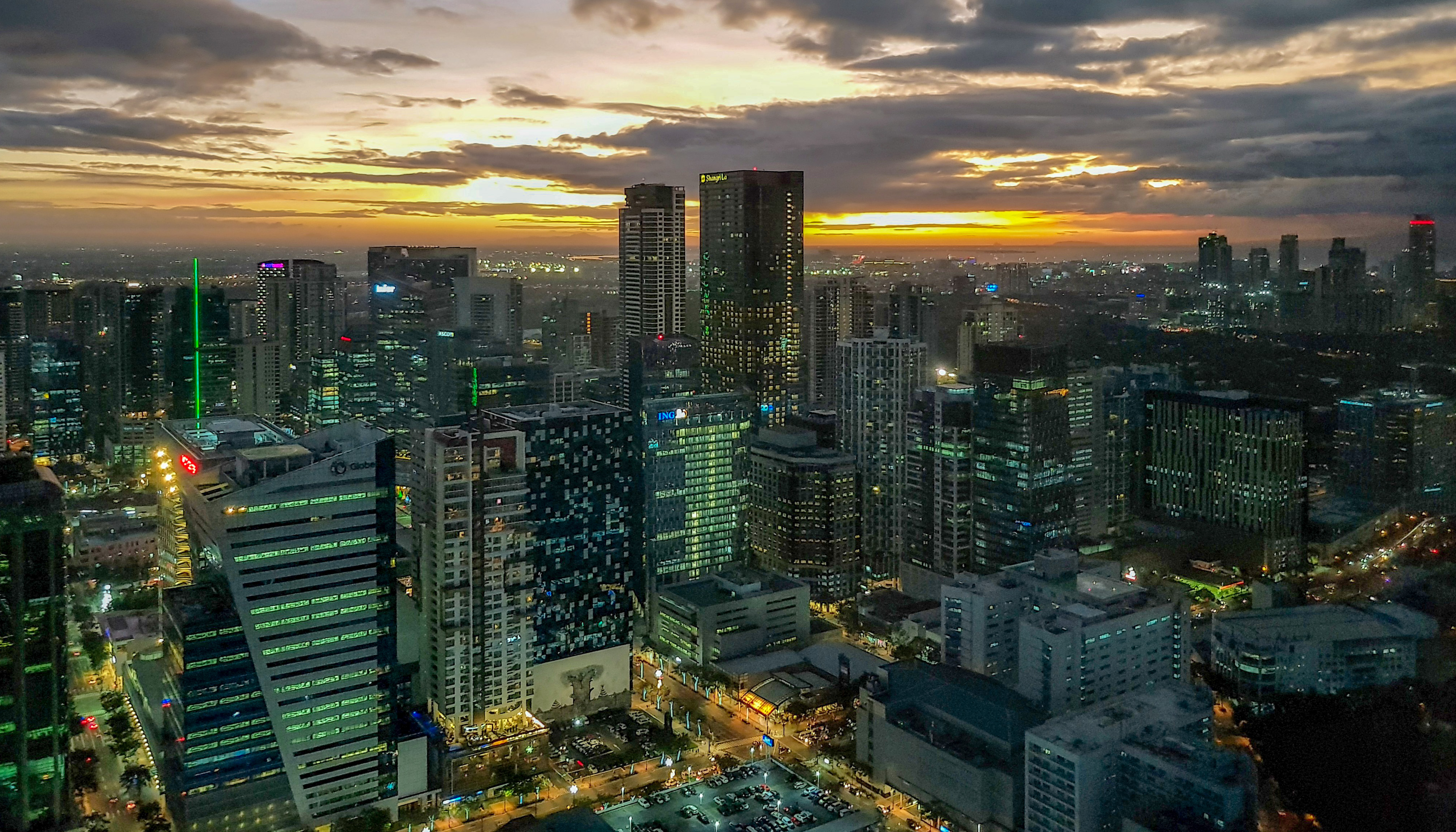
Skyline of Bonifacio Global City, Taguig

Many notable people were either born in Taguig or adopted it as their home. The demonym of Taguig is "Taguigeño".

== People from Taguig ==
=== Media and entertainment ===
- JM Yosures - singer, Tawag ng Tanghalan Grand Champion in 2021.
- Bayani Agbayani (born 1969)– actor, comedian
- Bea Alonzo (born 1987) – actress
- Boom Gonzalez (born 1980) – sportscaster and host
- Dina Bonnevie (born 1962) – actress
- Heath Jornales – actor, singer and composer
- Emmanuelle Vera – actress, singer and model
- Ervic Vijandre (born 1986) – actor
- Jun Banaag (born 1951) – radio anchor and disc jockey
- Katrina Dimaranan (born 1993) – actress and model
- KC Concepcion (born 1985) – actress, singer and model
- Lance Lucido (born 2007) – former child actor and dancer
- Lucita Soriano (1940–2015) – actress
- Michael V. (born 1969) – actor, comedian
- Omar Baliw – rapper, owner of High Minds clothing line
- Precious Lara Quigaman – actress and model
- Rene Requiestas (1957–1993) – comedian, actor and politician
- Richard Yap (born 1967) – actor and recording artist
- Rose Fostanes (born 1967) – singer
- Skusta Clee (born 1996)– rapper, singer-songwriter; member of Ex Battalion
- Solenn Heussaff (born 1985) – actress, singer and model

=== Military ===
- Frederick Walker Castle (1908–1944) – USAAF general officer

=== Politics ===
- Alan Peter Cayetano (born 1970) – Senator (2022–present)
- George Elias (born 1959) – Vice Mayor of Taguig (2004–2013)
- Lani Cayetano (born 1981) – Mayor of Taguig (2022–present)
- Lino Cayetano (born 1978) – Director and Mayor of Taguig (2019–2022)
- Pia Cayetano (born 1966) – Senator (2019–present)
- Rene Cayetano (1934–2003)– Senator (1998–2003)
- Arnel Cerafica (born 1965) – Congressman of the Taguig–Pateros 1st District (2010–2019)
- Henry Dueñas Jr. (born 1965) – Congressman of the Taguig–Pateros 2nd District (2007–2010)
- Dante Tiñga (born 1939) – Associate Justice of the Supreme Court (2003–2009)

=== Religion ===
- Felix Manalo (1886–1963) – founder of Iglesia ni Cristo
- Laureana Franco (1936–2011) – humanitarian, catechist and sainthood candidate

=== Sports ===
- Boybits Victoria (1972–2023) – professional basketball player
- Carlos Yulo (born 2000) – gymnast and Olympic gold medalist
- James delos Santos (born 1990) – karate practitioner
- James Yap (born 1982) – basketball player
- James Younghusband (born 1986) – footballer; brother of Phil
- Jemyca Aribado (born 1993) – professional squash player
- Phil Younghusband (born 1987) – footballer; brother of James

=== Others ===
- Jamalul Kiram III (1938–2013) – claimant to throne of Sultanate of Sulu

== See also ==
- List of people from Metro Manila
