= Leeroy New =

Filipino artist

Leeroy New (born 1986) is a contemporary Filipino fine artist whose works overlap with theatre, film, fashion, and visual arts. He is known for his collaborations with fashion designer Kermit Tesoro.

Winged Chimera by Leeroy New, fiberglass, approximately 4.5 ft. x 3.5 ft., 2015. In the Art Collection Samito Jalbuena

== Early life ==
New was born 1986 in General Santos. He graduated from the Philippine High School for the Arts and from the College of Fine Arts at the University of the Philippines. He has been drawing for as long as he can remember his hands being consciously mobile.

== Career ==
Prior to becoming renowned for his collaboration with Kermit Tesoro, New had already gained prestige in the fine arts industry. His works have been exhibited in the Singapore Biennale back in 2008, as well as the Fukuoka Asian Art Triennale in 2009.

=== 2010-11: Balete and Psychopomp's Reef ===
In July 2010, New opened an installation at the Ateneo Art Gallery (Formerly Rizal Library) that he called Balete. Inspired by Buddhist monks' saffron robes and the native Filipino balete vine, New used flexible orange casing used for electric conduits accented by plastic cable ties to form his unique perception of the balete vine. These pieces intertwined with the exterior and interior architecture of the art gallery. Balete remained on display at the Ateneo Art Gallery until December of the same year.

In December 2011, New launched Psychopomp's Reef at the Bonifacio Global City Offsite Gallery. Here he used the same orange electrical conduits and cable ties previously seen in Balete to create 'a space populated with otherworldly fauna.' The site remained open to visitors until February 2012.

=== Collaborations with fashion designers ===
In Fall of 2010, New teamed up with designer Kermit Tesoro to release a sci-fi inspired collection for the Philippine Fashion Week. This marks his second collaboration with the designer, the first one being his head sculpture designs for Tesoro's Spring 2009 collection. Using non-traditional design techniques and materials such as rubber, nylon, glass, and metal, to create unique, artistic looks.

In 2011, New was commissioned by renowned stylist Nicola Formichetti, a member of Lady Gaga's creative team, The Haus of Gaga. Inspired by his previous Fall 2010 collaboration with designer Tesoro, New made a cast of Gaga's body with previously sent in measurements, then sculpted the dress with clay and molded with silicon. According to Gaga, the dress was used in tandem with a continuation of her series on body modification, following the Born This Way era. She also stated that the indentation of the dress mirrored that of the face of her alter-ego, Yüyi the Mermaid.

=== 2013-present: Gates Of Hell ===
In October 2013, New launched a solo exhibit called Gates Of Hell' at the Manila Contemporary. Described as "a product of his generation's fascination with pop culture, graphic novels, sci-fi literature and industrial design", New creates a landscape built specifically as home to his iconic cast of aliens and monsters.

When asked about the inspiration for the exhibit, he shares,

To me, there’s no difference like how we believe these aswangs and monsters and this whole mythology of religion to sci-fi mythology. It’s all this desire to come up with stories to guide us in our experience in our daily lives. There’s a need to kind of fill this spiritual vacuum, be it in the form of aswang stories, folktales, or religious mythology and this projection of a fantasy future through sci-fi and superheroes, graphic novels or whatever.

— Leeroy New,

The exhibit was divided into three parts, a cave made of mangrove root formations, a hanging latex installation, and an area filled with floating geometrical structures. The exhibit closed November 2013.

=== Lanson Place ===
Leroy designed the Lanson Place-SM Mall of Asia artworks on the second floor ceiling which portrayed huge wind wave.

== Artistic practice ==
On being an artist, New states he prefers to be the kind that "can project his sensibilities into whatever form or medium he chooses to utilize for whatever reason". He also says, "[the] idea of public art, and transforming your immediate environment—it’s more of an active participation for me to transform the environment. It's my way of contributing and transforming my society". As a child his parents referred to him as 'a member of the Addam's Family' because of his weirdness as well as his fascination for horror and Philippine folklore.

He is also known for making TV show props and costumes. He enjoys working on props that allow him to design from a grand scale. It seems he does not favor any particular medium, rather he loves experimenting with and exploring as many mediums as he possibly can. His childhood dream is to work on a movie set, where he can dictate the form and appearance of the set he is being asked to create.

When asked about working on fashion pieces, his basic principles are applied in a similar way, albeit slightly different. He admires the works of Hussein Chalayan, Alexander McQueen, and Eiko Ishioka. He is also interested in eventually making toys.

Many of his works are inspired by mythology, film, video games, and other artists. Besides his fascination for Philippine folklore and western legends, he has expressed interest in Kaiju, or giant monsters in Japanese anime and television. Amongst his other influences, he cites H.R. Giger, Jason and the Argonauts, director Guillermo del Toro, and playing as alien characters in video games such as StarCraft, as well as being a fan of the trading card game Magic: The Gathering.
