= Augusto Arbizo =

Filipino visual artist

Augusto Arbizo (born 1972 in Quezon City, Philippines) is a visual artist, gallerist, art advisor, and art curator. As an artist he exhibited at White Columns, NY; Sandra Gering Gallery, NY; and Michael Steinberg Fine Art, NY. Group exhibitions include Artists Space, NY; PS1 MoMA, NY; and The Queens Museum of Art, NY. As a curator, he has organized exhibitions for Rachel Uffner Gallery; Chapter NY; Greenberg Van Doren Gallery; and White Columns. He was director of 11R Eleven Rivington, NY from 2007 to 2017. Arbizo joined the New York art advisory firm Schwartzman& in 2021. Arbizo was educated at The School of the Art Institute of Chicago, The Cooper Union School of Art, NY, and The University of Michigan.

== See also ==
- Arts of the Philippines
