= Kenneth Kit Lamug =

American writer, filmmaker

- Born: 1978 (age 47–48); Manila, Philippines
- Occupations: Filmmaker, writer, illustrator
- Writing career
- Pen name: Rabbleboy
- Genres: Fiction, comic books, film, photography
- Subjects: Street photography, documentary, horror, children's fiction, comics
- Notable works: A Box Story; Petro and The Flea King; Tall Tales of Talbot Toluca; Hurts Like A Mother
- Notable awards: Pinnacle Book Achievement Award Winner, Moonbeam Children's Book Awards, Literary Classics Children's Book Award, National Indie Excellence Book Awards Finalist Finalist, ThinkArt BEST OF SHOW – Black White and Night, Photographers Forum "Best of Photography" Finalist
- Website: www.kenlamug.com

Kenneth Kit Lamug (born 1978 in Manila, Philippines) is an American writer, illustrator, photographer and filmmaker. He is best known for his children's picture book A Box Story, co-creator of the independent film Vegasland, and his work on street photography. For his illustrative work, he is also known under the moniker Rabbleboy.

== Early life and background ==
Lamug grew up in Manila, Philippines. He went to San Sebastian College – Recoletos de Manila graduating in 1995. He moved to Las Vegas, Nevada USA in 1996 with his parents and siblings.

== Film ==
In 2006, Lamug co-wrote and co-directed with Thomas Vosicky the 45-minute underground film Bounce. The duo would meet again in 2008 to co-create and direct the independent film Vegasland.

== Photography ==
During his time-off from film, Lamug documented candid portraits of strangers through his street photography series. Some of his recognitions include the 2011 ThinkArt Best of Show "Black and White Night", a feature in the 2010 National Public Radio : 100 Words series, 2010 Above Second Gallery Hong Kong Booooooom.com exhibit, as well as a finalist for the Photographers Forum "Best of Photography" competition.

== Publishing ==
Lamug is a continuing contributor for Underneath The Juniper Tree, a macabre art and literature magazine for children. He also authored the picture book "A Box Story" (2012), which has won the 2012 Moonbeam Children's Book Awards, 2012 Pinnacle Book Awards, 2012 Literary Classic Book Awards and the 2012 National Indie Excellence Book Awards Finalist.

In 2013, Lamug was selected as a contributing artist for Tales from Lost Vegas, a comic published by Pop! Goes the Icon. The project was funded through the crowd-funding site, Kickstarter and was released during the annual Vegas Valley Comic Book Festival. Lamug's digital painting also placed first-runner up in the Vegas Valley Book Festival Badge Art Competition.

Underneath the Juniper Tree released in May 2013 a limited edition anthology book, which included artwork from Lamug along with stories and illustrations from other writers and artist.

Lamug's piece "Whale House" was also selected as part of HitRecord's third edition of The Tiny Book of Tiny Stories which was released in the fall of 2013.

== Awards and recognitions ==
- 2006 – Co-director/Cinematographer Feature: Bounce.
- 2006 – CityLife: Tough Enough Feature
- 2007 – Cinematographer Short : Here we go again
- 2007 – Writer/Cinematographer Short : Defragged
- 2008 – Co-director/Cinematographer Feature: Vegasland
- 2008 – CityLife: Against All Odds Feature
- 2008 – Nevada Camera Club Group Show
- 2008 – Las Vegas, Unscene Photography National Tour Symbolic Gallery
- 2008 – College of Southern Nevada Group Show
- 2009 – Canada, Photoshowcase.ca Magazine Feature
- 2009 – Cinevegas: Visions of Vegas Photography Feature
- 2009 – Los Angeles Center for Digital Art, Group Exhibit
- 2009 – Nov 13 College of Southern Nevada: Las Vegas Street Photography Feature
- 2010 – Enterprise Gallery, Las Vegas Nevada
- 2010 – Featured on Streephers.com
- 2010 – Featured on National Public Radio Picture Show
- 2010 – Above Second Gallery (Small Victories Exhibit via booooooom.com), Hong Kong
- 2010 – Photographers Forum "Best of Photography" Competition Finalist
- 2011 – One World, Many Stories Illustration Exhibit (Henderson, NV)
- 2011 – ThinkArt! Caramel Bar Bellagio (Las Vegas, NV)
- 2011 – SCBWI Bulletin Illustration Selection
- 2011 – Underneath The Juniper Tree Magazine – Story Illustrations
- 2011 – Underneath The Juniper Tree Magazine Cover Design
- 2011 – September – 2011 BEST OF SHOW – Black White & Night – Art Night
- 2011 – November – Vegas Valley Comic Book Festival Art Badge Competition Winner
- 2012 – Children's Literary Classics Seal of Approval (A Box Story)
- 2011 – September – Nevada SCBWI Logo Contest Winner**2012 – ForeWord Reviews Featured Book (A Box Story)
- 2012 – Moonbeam Children's Book Awards Silver Medalist (A Box Story)
- 2012 – Literary Classics Children's Book Award for Preschool (A Box Story)
- 2012 – National Indie Excellence Book Awards Finalist (A Box Story)
- 2012 – Pinnacle Book Achievement Award Winner (A Box Story)
