= Kermit Tesoro =

Filipino designer

- Born: Philippines
- Education: University of the Philippines Diliman; Instituto Cervantes de Manila; SoFa Design Institute; University of the Arts London Central Saint Martins
- Occupations: fashion designer, visual artist

Kermit Tesoro is a Filipino visual, installation, accessory, and fashion designer known for his wide range of styles where 'installation art meets body art'. He is notable for designing elaborate shoes inspired from environs and wildlife, clothes with kinky Filipinized nature patterns and bases, and installations which use tied-up living human bodies as a form of fetish art.

== Early life ==
Tesoro liked horticulture since his childhood days, collecting various plant species as he grew up. When he came to the University of the Philippines Diliman, however, he took up a degree in fine arts instead and used horticulture as one of his main inspirations in art. In later years, many of his shoes would be honed from the physical characteristics of plants, along with his own interpretation of fetishism. After finishing his degree in 2008, he studied Spanish at the Instituto Cervantes de Manila. He also took a course in marketing at the SoFa Design Institute, the Philippines' first design college. In 2012, he studied fashion design at the University of the Arts London Central Saint Martins in the United Kingdom.

== Career ==
Tesoro initially came into prominence through his sophisticated shoes that were used by Lady Gaga in many of her tours. He has used various mediums in his shoes such as wood, plaster, steel, leather, industrial resin, coral, and human bones and teeth, all of which have been inspired from natural environs and things found in specific environments. The first artwork he made were 9-inch Filipino clogs or bakya. He made them after being inspired by John Galliano's work with Dior.

In 2009, his art were exhibited by the Alliance Francaise de Manille from Paris titled "Portraits of Shoes, Stories of Feet" (Portraits de Chaussures, Histoires de Pieds): Group Show at the Yuchengco Museum Ayala Makati.

In 2011, his art premiered in New York City through the Shoes for Lady Gaga x Gilt Groupe exhibit. He also collaborated with Leeroy New for Lady Gaga's outfit (PFW Holiday 2010) for Marry the Night video and single cover. He was commissioned to design the film and theater costumes of Chris Millado's Zsa Zsa Zaturnnah Ze Musical at the CCP Complex.

He has participated in the 2012 Metrowear Fashion Show and the Philippine Fashion Week: Holiday 2012, along with getting accepted in the University of the Arts London Central Saint Martins College of Arts & Design. He designed the glass beaded body armor for Lady Gaga's Born This Way Ball Tour in Thailand and other costumes used in her Manila tour. A conservative Christian cult group in the Philippines has criticized Tesoro's skull works as 'demonic' as it was used by Lady Gaga. Tesoro retaliated with a new set of provocative art which gained international prominence.

In 2013, his works were exhibited in the Netherlands through the Mode Biennale Arnhem (MoBA) - Fetishism in Fashion, launching his career in Europe. His works were featured in the Philippines by ABS-CBN through one of its variety shows. Many of his art were acknowledged by the design industries in the United Kingdom, Netherlands, Switzerland, France, Austria and Germany, and later featured in ELLE US. In 2014, Tesoro was part of an exhibition in Spielzeug Welten Museum in Basel, Switzerland.

In 2015, after travelling to museums in the Netherlands, Germany, Austria, Slovakia, Italy, The Vatican, Sweden, Denmark, Finland, Norway, Ireland, France, and Switzerland, Tesoro began creating a new set of art, including the iconic tentacle shoes, Polypodis, which would propel his career in Europe further.

In 2017, Forbes featured Tesoro and his works, where he admitted that his works are 'a reflection of erotica and even fetishism, particularly how humans tap into their own sexuality'. He also explained the reason for his elaborate and sometimes disturbing shoes, stating that he used it to express 'mockery of people who used fashion as a way to impress and not as a form of expression'. The magazine called Tesoro the "Avant-Garde Philippine Shoe Artist". His works were exhibited in Cube Design Museum, in The Netherlands after travelling around the Philippines for inspiration on a new set of art.

In 2018, his Polypodis and Equilibria pieces were exhibited in Germany in Schloss & Park Lichtenwalde, a 'stage for artistic attitudes, high craftsmanship of international artists and designers'. His work was within the exhibition entitled "HIGH HEELS—The High Art of Shoes".

== Personal life ==
Tesoro lives with a dozen cats. He has a passion for horticulture and art, garnering a collection of cacti, succulents, and carnivorous plants. Most of his works have been inspired by 'his childhood fixations, world history, nature, science, fetishism and human behavior'.

Tesoro is a fan of the Art Nouveau movement. He cited Alphonse Maria Mucha as his inspiration for visual arts; Nicolas Ghesquière, Riccardo Tisci, Alexander McQueen, and Ramon Valera for fashion; and Sebastian Bach for music. He considers Atang dela Rama, Pacita Delos Reyes, and Rosario Melgar de Luna as style icons. He has described his art as an art that translates 'people's deviations'. Many of his art have exhibited elaborate kinky motifs with hints of vernacular plant designs.
