= Froilan Calayag =

Filipino visual artist in painting

- Born: Froilan Labis Calayag; October 15, 1982 (age 43); Manila, Philippines
- Education: Technological University of the Philippines
- Known for: Painting

Froilan Calayag (born October 15, 1982) is a Filipino painter. As “The Prince of Dark Fairy Tales”, Calayag is well known for his surrealist, cartoon-like figures and creatures as subjects of his works, presenting them with often colorful and playful settings.

== Early career ==
Froilan Labis Calayag is a Bulacan-based artist born in Manila, Philippines. Being the only artist in his family, Calayag has been a self-taught artist since he was young. He earned his Bachelor of Fine Arts degree majoring in Advertising in the Technological University of the Philippines.

As a student, Froilan Calayag was active in participating in numerous art competitions earning him several of his awards and recognition to date. As his earliest achievements and recognition back in 2001, when he was still in college, Calayag was the runner-up of the UNFPA Poster Making Contest for National Capital Region, 2nd Place for the PLDT-DPC National Directory Cover Design Competition National Level, and lastly a finalist in the 34th Shell National Students Art Competition.

The following year, he was able to, again, bring home three awards; the first being the First Honorable Mention for Sagip Foundation, second, being the 3rd Place in the UST Interschool On-The-Spot Art Competition, and lastly, being a finalist once again in the 35th Shell National Students Art Competition. The same year, he participated as an artist in the St. James the Apostle Parish Church’ Benefit Art Exhibit in Paombong, Bulacan, entitled, “Alay Sining Art Exhibition”.

In 2003, aside from winning Third Place in the Philippine Maritime Institute On-The-Spot Painting Competition and being an honorable mention in the 36th Shell National Students Art Competition, Froilan Calayag also had several affiliations for the year. He worked behind the visual effects of the film “Mulawin: The Movie” as an artist on miniatures, worked as a toy designer for Ten’s Woodworks until 2004, and also being a guest judge in the Jollibee Junk Art Competition called “Kaya Mo Kid”. His first group exhibit, “Kristo” in Hiyas ng Bulacan Museum in Bulacan, was also held the same year.

One of Calayag’s greatest achievements during his college years was winning the 37th Shell National Students Art Competition in 2004 as the Grand Prize Winner. He also was able to win as a Semi-Finalist in the 2004 Deovir Art Competition, and became the featured artist in Deovir the same year. That year, he started to do an art missionary work for the St. Vincent Foundation in Quezon City until 2006.

== Career ==
After graduating college, Froilan Calayag continued to join nationwide competitions earning him more credit as one of the country's up and coming artists. In 2005, Calayag won as a finalist in the Sail Painting Competition, and as a semi-finalist in the Metrobank MADE Art Competition. The following year, he won again as a semi-finalist in the same competition. In 2010, he won as one of the ten finalists of the Philippine Art Awards for his painting, The Mother's Revenge (inspired by Rizal's work). As a promising young artist, Calayag was awarded in the Gintong Kabataan for Visual Arts (Luzon) in 2008.

Aside from joining competitions, he also worked as a muralist for The House of Rajo Laurel in 2006 and kept himself busy in the years after by working again as muralist in the Penguin Bar in 2011 and as a volunteer artist for the Tibetan Temple Mural in 2012. From 2008 to present, Froilan Calayag has also been invited by several institutions and organizers as a guest speaker, judge, and artist; the University of Santo Tomas, Bulacan State University, and De La Salle University are some of the institutions that have invited Calayag to be the guest speaker, while in 2010 Artwork T-shirt Design Competition, a guest judge. In 2009, he contributed as an artist in "A Book About Death" at the Emily Harvey Foundation Gallery in New York City, and was one of the featured artists in Artes De Las Filipinas' published book, "Private Collections: The Lives and Art Collection of Thirty Filipino Art Collectors". In the year 2011, Calayag was a participant of the Ax(is) Art Project in Baguio, a festival organizer in Pambihirang Kamanyang Art Festival: Art Conference and Workshop, and was again the featured artist in Deovir.

Throughout his career as a painter, Froilan Calayag has participated in quite a number of collaborations and group exhibits both in the Philippines and abroad, collectively; and has since held seven solo exhibits to date.

== Exhibitions ==
=== Solo exhibitions ===
Date / Year	Title	Gallery / Place
December 2013	"Bring Your Gifts"	West Gallery
November 2013	"Night Of The Gifted Children"	West Gallery
December 2011	"Return Of The Gifted"	PABLO Fort
September 2010	"After The Rain"	Total Gallery Alliance Francaise De Manille
2009	"Here Comes The Black Clouds"	The Big And Small Art Co.
2008	"Life Is Like Candy"	Cultural Center of the Philippines
2007	"Tales From My Strange Gift"	The Big And Small Art Co.

=== Selected group exhibitions ===
Date / Year	Title	Gallery / Place
2017	"Imagination Area"	Secret Fresh Gallery, RONAC Art Center, Ortigas
2013	"Elegy To Andres Bonifacio"	Yuchengco Museum
2012	"Sa Pagliyab ng Hilaga"	The Crucible Gallery, SM Megamall
2011	"Vinyl+Splash: The Ultimate Collectible and Comic Convention"	Fully Booked, The Fort
2011	"Philippine National Hero Rizal"	Yuchengco Museum
2011	"Rizal"	Art Center, SM Megamall
January 2011	"We Are Not Aimless"	Manila Contemporary
January 2011	"Rogue Wave!"	Taksu Singapore
2010	"Kiss My Analog"	Viny On Vinyl Gallery
2010	"Wild"	The Big And Small Art Co., SM Megamall
2010	"Implode: TUP Alumni Art Exhibition"	Bulwagang Juan Luna Main Gallery, CCP
2009	"Loverules"	Boston Gallery, Quezon City
2009	"FTW"	Tala Gallery
2009	"If I Were A Monster"	White Box, Cubao Expo
2009	"After Fear Show"	The Big And Small Art Co.
2009	"Unang Hayag Sining: Emerging Artists 2009"	Gallerie Anna
2009	"Art For Youth’s Sake: Eksibit Para Sa Kabataan ng Payatas"	Congress Lobby, House of Representatives
2008	"The Hands That Feed"	Pan Pacific Hotel, Manila
2008	"In This Dreamland We Share"	The Big And Small Art Co.
2008	"Art 40"	Pinto Gallery
2008	"Myths"	Singapore
2008	"Beautiful Sins"	Art Asia, SM Megamall
2008	"Beginning"	The Big And Small Art Co.
2007	"D2 Na Me, Wer Na U"	Nineveh Art Gallery, Laguna
2007	"Four Equal Sides"	The Big And Small Art Co.
2007	"The Blanc Show"	Blanc Gallery
2007	"Celebration of Youth: Arts and Guitar"	The Big And Small Art Co.
2007	"Tutok: Kasaysayan"	Glorietta Art Space
2007	"Through The Palette’s Eye"	Bulwagang Juan Luna Main Gallery, CCP
2006	"Arts On Violin"	Art Center, SM Megamall
2006	"Tutok: Dos Por Dos"	Boston Gallery, Quezon City
2006	"Trinity"	Nineveh Art Space
2006	"Sweet Screams"	Art Center, SM Megamall
2006	"The Place Where Lovers and Liars Cry"	The Big And Small Art Co.
2006	"Alab"	Art Center, SM Megamall
2006	"Cocktales"	The Big And Small Art Co.
2006	"Kristo"	Serendra, Taguig
2005	"Philippine-Korean Art Exhibition"	Korea
2005	"Tam-Awan Art Exhibition"	Baguio City
2005	"Amalgamasyon"	Malolos, Bulacan
2004	"Kristo"	Hiyas ng Bulacan Museum

=== Collaborations ===
Date / Year	Title	Gallery / Place
March 2014	"Gary Baseman: Play With Us Or Else"	Vinyl on Vinyl Gallery
June 2012	"7 Chronicles Of Madness"	Vinyl on Vinyl Gallery
2011	"Box Boy Toy Launch/Collaboration Exhibit"	Ronac Art Center
