= Juan Abad =

Filipino printer turned playwright and journalist

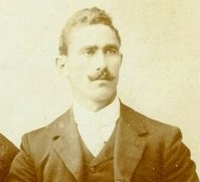
Juan Abad

Juan Abad (February 8, 1872 – December 24, 1932) was a Filipino printer, playwright, and journalist-1899. His main contribution to Filipino theatre was his patriotic plays: the zarzuela Ang Tanikalang Guinto (The Golden Chain), and Isang Punglo ng Kaaway, the former which, caused his arrest and trial. Some authors credit Abad with the introduction of symbolism to Tagalog drama, a claim which is still to be proven; although he may have been one of the first Tagalog dramatists to use symbolism in their plays.

== Early life ==
Juan Abad was born in Sampaloc, Manila to Ambrosio Abad, a bookbinder, and Bonifacia Domingo, a cook and vendor. Abad had little formal schooling and was forced to work at an early age, mostly because of his family's large size. He started working at a printing press during his teenage years, and began writing verse at age sixteen. His first drama, a nine-act comedia entitled Suenos dela mala fortuna, was staged in the Dulaang Arevalo (Arevalo Theater) of Sampaloc in 1895, when Abad was 23.

== Activities during the Philippine Revolution ==
Abad was barely finished writing Tanikalang Guinto when the Katipunan uprising broke out at Pugad Lawin on August 23, 1896. The uprising soon spread to other provinces and metamorphosed into the Philippine Revolution. Abad burned most of his papers, left his post as compositor at the Jesuit press, and joined the Revolution. Abad joined the staff of the paper La Independencia on its flight out of Manila, and served as teniente factor in the Malolos government. When the second phase of the Philippine Revolution began and the capital at Malolos was abandoned, Abad joined the staff of the paper La Republica Filipina to San Fernando, Pampanga. Abad used the pen names Inumaga, Daba, and K. Ulayaw.

== Activities during the Philippine-American War ==
During the latter part of 1899, Abad fled to Manila, where he worked for the paper Ang Kapatid ng Bayan, which was published by Pascual Poblete. On December 30, 1899, Abad, together with José Palma, Faustino Salomon, Emilio Reyes, and Felipe Mendoza, published the paper Laong-Laan. (meaning "ever-prepared" in Tagalog) This project proved to be short-lived, as the American authorities began to crack down on patriotic publications.

Palma and Abad were arrested soon after Laong-Laan came out; both were freed and put on probation. After that incident Abad joined the staff of another patriotic paper, this time, the daily Dimas-alang of Dr. Manuel Xerez Burgos. The first issue of this paper came out on February 5, 1900, and ceased publication two months later, on April 5, upon orders from American authorities. Abad was able to escape persecution for he only played an administrative role, and did not substantially contribute to the content of the paper.

Realizing that journalism was too dangerous and unprofitable for his circumstances, Abad turned to the writing of patriotic dramas, which were gaining followers at that time, due in part to the popularity of plays such as Pascual Poblete's Amor Propio, and Manuel Xerez y Burgos' Con La Cruz y La Espada. Writers who were influenced by these developments in Philippine theater included Mariano Sequera, Honorio López, and Abad, who banded together to form an organization dedicated to the development of patriotic drama and to the repudiation of the old dramatic forms of comedia and moro-moro. This organization was called La Juventud Filipina, and consisted mostly of staffers from the disbanded Dimas-alang daily.

The staging of Sequera's next play, entitled Mapanglaw na Pagka-alala (Sentimental Reminiscence), at the Teatro Universal on September 3, 1900, precipitated its author's arrest. Other members of the Juventud were subsequently investigated, including Abad, who was later arrested for failure to take the oath of allegiance to the United States. He was later exiled to Olongapo, together with Honorio Lopez.

Abad's experiences in Olongapo provided the material for his next work, a three-act zarzuela entitled Manila-Olongapo. This three-act play debuted at the Teatro Zorrilla in June 1901.

== Ang Tanikalang Ginto ==
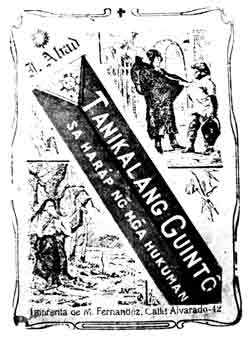
Tanikalang Guinto

On February 2, 1902, Abad's one-act Bulaklak ng Sampalok (Flower of Sampalok) saw its maiden performance in the Teatro Oriental, even as the same play won a gold pen in a literary contest, and gained newfound popularity for its author. In the same year, Abad broke through the Philippine drama scene with the successful staging of Ang Tanikalang Guinto in Teatro Libertad on July 7. Performances of the play in Laguna and Cavite were met with praise and admiration.

Ang Tanikalang Guinto made its Batangas debut on May 10, 1903, in the town of Batangas. On the same day American provincial authorities seized the play's script and sued Abad for sedition. Judge Paul Linebarger of the Batangas Court of First Instance deemed the play seditious; Abad was found guilty of sedition and sentenced two years in jail plus a fine of two thousand dollars.

Abad posted a bail bond and was able to go free pending a decision on his conviction, which was appealed to the Supreme Court. While waiting for the decision, Abad wrote another nationalistic play, Isang Punglo ng Kaaway (One Enemy Bullet), which was first performed at the Teatro Rizal in Malabon on May 9, 1904. Punglo caused Abad's subsequent arrest, which in turn, put an end to his career as a dramatist. On August 9, 1906, the Supreme Court, in a decision written by Justice Charles A. Willard, overturned Abad's conviction mainly on technical grounds. According to the Court (speaking through Justice Willard):

It was proved at the trial that this drama, prior to its presentation at Batangas, had been presented more than twenty times in different theaters of Manila, La Laguna, and Cavite, the first of these representations commencing in October, 1902. The defendant, the author, testified that after three representations in Manila, he had read in a newspapers that an order had been issued by the public authorities requiring that all plays, before their presentation, should be submitted for examination to the division of information. He thereupon took his play to the office of John F. Green and left if there for examination. It was returned to him the next day, with authority to present it. There was no evidence to contradict this statement, although there is some evidence to show that one day was not a sufficient time for a proper examination of the work. However it may be, it is apparent that the play was not considered seditious by the authorities of Manila.

An examination of the dramas which were considered in the cases of the United States vs. Tolentino,1 No. 1451, decided March 6, 1906, and of the United States vs. Cruz,2 No. 2128, will show that anyone reading these dramas or seeing them presented could not fail to understand their seditious tendencies, something which, according to the witnesses of the Government in this case, a great majority of the spectators of this drama could not see.

== Retirement and later life ==
The rise of the cinema and the decline of nationalist theater convinced Abad to shift careers. After he retired from the writing of drama, Abad published Ang Tanikalang Guinto in 1907, after which he turned to teaching and occasional stage production with his own compania volante (flying troupe). After his second marriage to the Batangueña Genoveva Clar de Jesus, he began to teach the Tagalog alphabet, even publishing a Tagalog primer. When this did not net enough income, Abad entered agriculture, supplying chickens, eggs, and vegetables to Manila, pursuing herbal medicine as a hobby.

In 1923 Abad returned to Manila and opened a printing shop on Tuason street. He subsequently became active in the labor movement with his membership in the Legionarios del Trabajo. Abad briefly edited the Legionario journal Araw, and in 1928, he was briefly sent to China for a mission. Upon his return to the Philippines some Chinese friends of his arranged another China trip for him. Abad would never return to the Philippines as he encountered trouble with his assumed Chinese passport. He died near Xiamen (then Amoy) and was buried there.
