= Roberto Villanueva (dancer) =

American dancer, teacher, artistic director, and producer (born 1970)

Roberto Villanueva is a Filipino–American dancer, teacher, artistic director, and producer. He performed with Complexions Contemporary Ballet and Alpha Omega Theatrical Dance Company before founding BalaSole Dance Company.

== Early life and career ==
Born and raised in Manila, The Philippines after graduating early from Colegio de San Juan de Letran, Villanueva moved to New York to study accounting at the University of Buffalo. Taking an introductory dance class to fulfill physical education requirements led him to switch his concentration to dance.

Two years later, he won the Dance Masters of America Competition and a special scholarship to the school of Alvin Ailey American Dance Theater. Though acknowledged as a "powerhouse dancer", Villanueva was frequently passed over for work due to his short stature. Despite these restrictions, he was invited by Desmond Richardson to join Complexions Contemporary Ballet. He also performed with Alpha Omega Theatrical Dance Company, where he worked extensively with Eleo Pomare.

Following the death of his father, Villanueva acknowledged his disenchantment with the lack of greater artistic prospects and became a financial manager for fifteen years. During this period, he graduated with his Masters from the Public Administration Program from John Jay College of Criminal Justice, and worked as cash fund manager for Wasserstein Perella & Co. and director of operations for the American Bible Society.

Frustrated by the continued dearth of representation in dance, Villanueva founded BalaSole Dance Company to "address the inequity of opportunities afforded talented dancers with unconventional attributes". Through BalaSole, he has presented artists from all over the world as well as his own work to great acclaim.

In addition to his solo career, Villanueva has taught for Ballet Philippines, the University at Buffalo, East Carolina University, Glendale Community College, the University of the Philippines, and the school at Dance Masters of America. He is the Director of Dance for College of Mount Saint Vincent, where his company is in residence. From 2012 through 2017, he led Dance Theatre of Harlem's Dancing through the Barriers program.

== Personal life ==
In 2012, he was nominated for The Outstanding Filipino American in New York (TOFA-NY). In 2013 he received a "Distinguished Alumni Award" from the University at Buffalo's Theater & Dance Department.
