= Dolores Paterno =

Filipina composer (1854–1881)

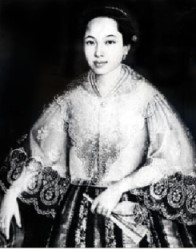
- Portrait c. 1870 by Justiniano Asuncion
- Born: Dolores Paterno y de Vera-Ignacio; March 10, 1854; Santa Cruz, Manila, Captaincy General of the Philippines
- Died: July 3, 1881 (aged 27)
- Resting place: Manila North Cemetery
- Education: Santa Isabel College, Manila
- Occupation: Composer
- Known for: "La Flor de Manila" ('The Flower of Manila')
- Style: Romantic

Dolores Paterno y de Vera-Ignacio (March 10, 1854 – July 3, 1881) was a Filipina composer known for the song "La Flor de Manila" (also known as "Sampaguita").

== Biography ==
Dolores Paterno e Ignacio (anglicized as Dolores Paterno-Ignacio) was born on March 10, 1854, in Santa Cruz, Manila, Philippines. She was one of the thirteen children of Máximo Molo-Agustín-Paterno y Yamzon and Carmen de Vera-Ignacio y Pineda

Dolores Paterno came from the wealthy mestizo sangley Paterno family. She was the sister of Lcdo. Dr. Pedro Alejandro Paterno, a Filipino politician, poet, and novelist. Her sisters and stepsisters, Águeda, Jácoba, Paz, Concepcion, and Adelaida, were celebrated painters and jewellers whose works were exhibited at the Exposición Regional de Filipinas in Manila in 1895 and at the St. Louis World's Fair in 1904. She was also related to the Asuncion brothers, among them Justiniano Asuncion who painted her portrait in 1870.

Musically inclined at a young age, she was sent by her parents to the Santa Isabel College, Manila, an all-girls Catholic school managed by the Daughters of Charity. She devoted much of her time to learning the piano. In 1879, at the age of 25 she composed her only known work, "La Flor de Manila" ('The Flower of Manila'), inspired by the sampaguita flower. The lyrics were by her brother Pedro Paterno, based on a poem of the same title written by their mother.

She died at the age of 27 on July 3, 1881.

== La Flor de Manila ==
La Sampaguita
Played by the Philippine Constabulary Band. This recording was released in 1910 under Edison Records

"La Flor de Manila" is of the Habanera genre (also known as Contradanza or Danza). It was popular during the end of the 19th century and the early period of the American Commonwealth. It has since been considered a Philippine romantic classic. The lyrics were translated from Spanish into Tagalog by the Filipino National Artist Levi Celerio. An arrangement of the song by Rosendo E. Santos, Jr. was also included in the repertoire of the Harvard Glee Club, during their tour of the Philippines in 1961. It is sung by the Graduating Students of Centro Escolar University during their Annual Sampaguita Interlude as their closing number. The marching band arrangement of it entitled "Sampaguita March" was released in 1974, being performed by Malabon Brass Band. The arrangement is the official inspection march of the Vice President of the Philippines. This was first used as an official inspection march of President Noynoy Aquino from 2010 to 2012. It is currently used as the official inspection march of President Bongbong Marcos and Vice President Sara Duterte.

=== Earliest lyrics ===
La Flor de Manila
(Original Spanish)

I
Sampaguita gentil que halagas
con tu aroma mi filipina,
sampaguita flor peregrina
¡ay!, que en tus trenzas bordando estás.

Tú que en breve collar prendida
dulce besas su ardiente seno,
quien pudiera de amor lleno,
flor venturosa tú, y cual tú y gozar.

Dichosa tú que al perfumar el viento
tu aroma y su aliento confúndense al par.
Dichosa tú que en lánguido embeleso
darle ha acostumbrado un beso,
su boca inquieta llena de afán.

Flor de las flores,
tesoro hermoso de hondos amores.
¡Ay quien pudiera, flor pura, por verte así,
así cual tú y gozar!

II
[ De Manila flor hechicera,
de ella encanto y envidia mía,
sampaguita feliz que un día
ay!, prenda fuiste de mi pasión.

Si de dicha y pasión tus hojas
marchitarse en su seno visten,
juzga cuanto mi pecho triste
de celos viéndote, ay!, sufrió.]

Ay ve a calmar a este pecho que se agita,
feliz sampaguita, más feliz que yo.
Ve a acariciar con tu halago su cabello,
corre a ceñir su cuello mientras de gloria
muero de amor.

Flor peregrina que adora tanto la filipina,
ay quien pudiera,
flor pura, por verte así,
así cual tú y morir.

=== Translated versions ===
Sampaguita
(Tagalog version by Levi Celerio)

Sampaguita ng aming lipi,
bulaklak na sakdal ng yumi
Ikaw ang mutyang pinili
Na sagisag ng aming lahi,

At ang kulay mong binusilak
Ay diwa ng aming pangarap,
Ang iyong bango't halimuyak
Sa tuwina'y aming nilalanghap.

O bulaklak, na nagbibigay ligaya,
O! paraluman, mutyang Sampaguita,
Larawang mistula ng mga dalaga;
Ikaw ang tanging bituin
Hiraman ng kanilang ganda.

Ang iyong talulot
Ang siyang tunay na sagisag
Ng sa dalagang puso'y wagas,
Kayumian at pagkamatapat.

The Flower of Manila
(English version)

Lovely bloom of the Sampaguita
By my Philippine maid beloved,
Not a flow'r in the world is sweeter
As you circle her lovely brow!

In the daintiest collar clinging,
With one bud like a pendant swinging,
Round the neck of the gentle and beautiful one,
How happy and fortunate now!

Beautiful flow'r Enchantment of fair Manila
With happiness fill her,
O bright Sampaguita Beautiful flow'r
O rest on her hair so lightly!

Softly caressing, touch her with blessing
Dear Sampaguita flow'r Green of the Garden!
Beloved symbol of my dear maiden,
Pure Sampaguita, Entreat her to smile again
My flow'r of flow'rs

== See also ==
- Pedro A. Paterno

== Bibliography ==
- Camacho (2000). 100 taon, 100 Filipina sa digmaan at sa kapayapaan. Quezon City: Leonarda Navato-Camacho.
- The National Historical Institute (1989). Filipinos in history (vol. 5). Manila: The National Historical Institute.
