= L.A. Lopez =

Filipino actor and singer

- Born: Lyle Areanne Lopez; June 1, 1985 (age 41); Quezon City, Philippines
- Genres: OPM, pop
- Occupations: Singer, actor, musical theatre actor, preacher, public speaker
- Instrument: Vocals (baritone)
- Years active: 1986–1997; 2002; 2018–present
- Labels: Star; Windsound
- Website: www.lylelopez.net

Lyle Areanne Lopez (born June 1, 1985 in Quezon City) is a Filipino actor, singer and preacher. Formerly known as L.A. Lopez', he was "discovered" by the comedy king Dolphy Quizon in a talent search titled That's My Boy. He began his career as a child actor on the children's show Eh Kasi Bata. Garnered several Awit Awards as a child singer.

He made a comeback in 2002 with the song "Yakap" which made it to the top Billboard charts and Radio countdowns in the Philippines. Lyle is a born-again Christian, and currently the head pastor and worship leader in Abundant Harvest Fellowship Philippines, A missionary church from Crescent City Florida, planted at the heart of Quezon City Philippines.

He also established Jzone Pinoy, the Tagalog wing of the Christ Commission Fellowship's Youth Ministry J-Zone (now Elevate). He studied Musical Theatre in Florida School of the Arts, U.S.A under the Presidential scholarship granted to him. Recently, he composed and released a song entitled "I See You" which became the theme for ABS-CBN's My Binondo Girl Love Team Jade and Andy.

== Discography ==
- Ang Batang Mabait (1993, Alpha Music)
- L.A. Lopez (1994, Ivory Music & Video)
- Shine (1997, Alpha Music)
- Yakap (2002, Star Records) received his gold record award.
- Love Never Fails (2016, Windsound)
- Ikaw Pa Rin (2018, Star Music)
