= Isabel Larrañaga Ramírez =

Filipino Religious sister and Venerable

Venerable Isabel of the Heart of Jesus HCSCJ
- Born: 19 November 1836; Manila, Captaincy General of the Philippines
- Died: 17 January 1899 (aged 62); Havana, Cuba

Isabel de Larrañaga Ramírez, HCSCJ (19 November 1836 - 17 January 1899), religious name Isabel of the Heart of Jesus, born in Manila, was a Filipino religious sister. She founded the Hermanas de la Caridad del Sagrado Corazón de Jesús ("Sisters of the Charity of the Sacred Heart of Jesus"). Her beatification process was opened in 1982.

== Life ==
Isabel de Larrañaga was born in Manila, Philippines, on 19 November 1836, to Juan Andrés Ma. de Larrañaga (the Military Governor of Manila at that time) and Isabel Ramírez Patiño. Her father was from Spain, and her mother was born of Spanish descent in Lima, Peru. They were married in Huancayo, Peru.

She was the youngest of ten children. Her parents were Spanish and she was a Filipina by birth and by virtue of citizenship. She was baptized in San Miguel de Arcángel in Malacañan 30 days after her birth.

After the death of her father in 1838, her mother returned to Spain with the children. Ramírez spent her childhood and early adolescence in Madrid and in Lima. Her mother ensured that Ramírez received a good education, learning music, painting, and languages (French, English, and Italian).

In 1855, Ramírez accompanied her mother and brother, Francisco Adrian, to Lima, Peru. There, the eighteen-year-old Ramírez became a teacher and engaged in charity work. She visited patients in hospitals, and became a catechist for children and young people. Seven years later, she and her mother went returned to Spain, and they resided in Madrid.

== Death ==
In 1894 Ramírez sent a religious expedition to Cuba in spite of the delicate political situation during that time. During her second trip to Cuba, she suffered from heart problems which were aggravated with sufferings from the war, which eventually led to her death on 17 January 1899. She left a flourishing institute that has extended on Puerto Rico, Venezuela, Peru, and Chile.

== Beatification process ==
On 17 December 1982, Isabel of the Heart of Jesus's beatification cause was opened by Pope John Paul II; thereby, bestowing her the title of a Servant of God. Seventeen years later, on 26 March 1999, Ramírez was indicated as venerable by Pope John Paul II.

== Sources ==
- newsaints.faithweb website
- www.archimadrid.es
