= Cecilio Apóstol =

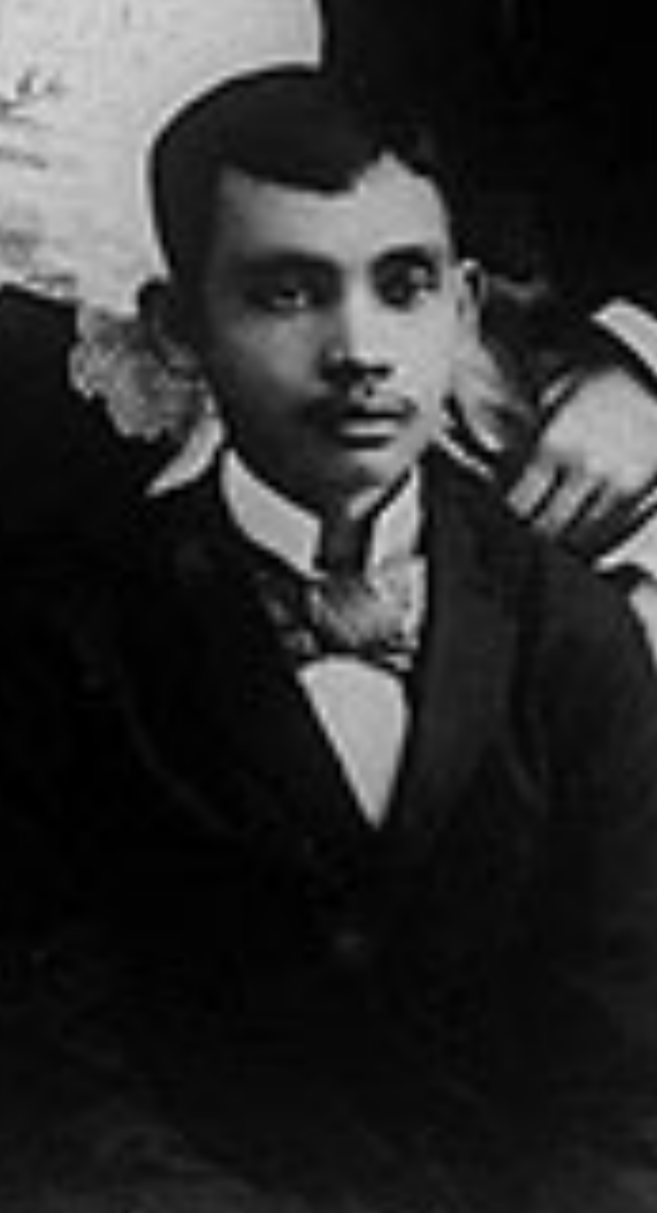
- Apostol as a staff of the La Independencia newspaper, c. 1898
- Born: November 22, 1877; Santa Cruz, Manila, Captaincy General of the Philippines
- Died: September 8, 1938 (aged 60); Caloocan, Rizal, Commonwealth of the Philippines
- Occupation: poet

Cecilio Apóstol (November 22, 1877 – September 8, 1938) was a Filipino poet and poet laureate. His poems were once used to teach the Spanish language under the Republic Act No. 1881.

He was born in Santa Cruz, Manila and studied at the Ateneo de Manila University where he finished his Bachelor of Arts, before studying law at the University of Santo Tomas. During the early years of American occupation, he worked as a journalist for the revolutionary newspapers Independence, The Brotherhood, The Union, Renaissance and Democracy. His pseudonym on his work at the La Independencia, under Antonio Luna, was Catulo. He later joined the Nacionalista Party which wanted the independence of the Philippines from the United States. He was a member of the Philippine Academy from 1924 until his death. Apóstol wrote in English and Spanish, and composed poems that demonstrated his mastery of Spanish. He composed the poem Al Heroe Nacional (To the National Hero) which is dedicated to José Rizal. In the book of poems, Pentélicas, he described landscapes evoking a vivid image. He died in Caloocan, Rizal.
