= Pitoy Moreno =

Filipino fashion designer

- Born: Jose Reyes Moreno Jr. 25 February 1925; Philippine Islands
- Died: 15 January 2018 (aged 92); Manila, Philippines
- Resting place: Manila Memorial Park – Sucat, Paranaque, Philippines
- Other name: Pitoy
- Occupation: Fashion designer
- Years active: 1950–2009

Jose "Pitoy" Reyes Moreno Jr. (25 February 1925 – 15 January 2018) was a Filipino fashion designer and one of the earliest advocates of the Maria Clara gown. He is widely regarded in the Asian fashion field as the Fashion Czar of Asia. He established the spotlight on Filipino fashion in the world artistic fashion scene during the 1960s until his retirement, paving the way for young Filipino fashion designers in Europe, the Middle East, the Americas, and other parts of Southeast Asia.

== Early life ==
Moreno studied at the University of the Philippines with a bachelor's degree in fine arts. During his stay in the university, he joined the Upsilon Sigma Phi fraternity, where he managed to build a strong social network with Ferdinand Marcos, Ninoy Aquino, and Salvador Laurel. He became close friends with Celia Diaz, who would later marry Doy Laurel, and the painter Araceli "Cheloy" Dans, to whom he gave his first hand-crafted wedding gown. In an interview, Moreno stated that during his stay in the University of the Philippines, he developed "a finer sense of the fashion world".

== Career ==
Moreno became the president of the Philippine Couture Association, the first association of fashion designers in Manila, Philippines. He was the fashion designer for the Bayanihan Philippine Dance Company. His fashion designs were exhibited at the World's Fair in Seattle, Washington, and New York City. His fashion designs appeared on the pages of fashion magazines such as Vogue, Harper's Bazaar, Holiday, and Le Figaro, where Moreno introduced the words jusi, piña, and lepanto to world fashion, the first time Filipino fashion terminologies were incorporated in world fashion artistry.

Due to his popularity from the 1960s to 1980s, many heads of state, royalties, and prominent personalities from Asia, Europe, and the Americas became his clients for decades. Prominent people who were adorned by Moreno's artistic beadwork, embroidery and hand-paintings include the First Ladies of the Philippines from the 1960s to the 1980s, United States first ladies Nancy Reagan and Pat Nixon; Betty Ford, Queen Sirikit of Thailand, Tsaritsa Margarita of Bulgaria, Queen Sofía of Spain, Princess Margaret of the United Kingdom, the Marquesa de Villaverde, María del Carmen Martínez-Bordiú y Franco, Princess Suga of Japan, Cristina Ford (second wife of Henry Ford II), Margot Fonteyn, Deeda Blair (Catherine "Deeda" Gerlach, wife of William McCormick Blair, Jr.), and Filipino celebrities.

Moreno also authored the books Kasalan, a fashion book about Filipino weddings, and Philippine Costume, a book on traditional Filipino dresses. He was regarded as the Fashion Czar of Asia by French tabloid Le Figaro, sealing his status as fashion royalty. The title later on was used by the Asian fashion community in defining the artistic works of Moreno. Despite the fame, Moreno was known by many accounts for his rooted behavior where he would give-away his prized gowns for people who could not afford lavish weddings.

In 1962, Moreno designed a dress for Puerto Rican actress Rita Moreno for the Academy Awards where she won Best Supporting Actress. She later wore the same dress at the 2018 ceremony where it made news. The dress is now on display at the Academy Museum of Motion Pictures.

== Retirement ==
Due to old age, Moreno retired from his craft and became an adviser to young fashion designers, passing on his knowledge on artistic beadwork on different Filipino fabrics.

In 2009, Jose "Pitoy" Moreno was declared as a National Artist for Fashion Design by President Gloria Macapagal-Arroyo. However, this was met with protest by other National Artists, such as Bienvenido Lumbera (National Artist for Literature), who told media that the category of Fashion Design was not an accepted art form and was simply dressmaking, not art. The Supreme Court issued a temporary restraining order (TRO) on the conferment of the National Artist award to Moreno and six other recommendees. Later on, the National Artist title on Moreno and three other recommendees were revoked by the Supreme Court in 2013 after finding that former president Arroyo personally conferred the award to the four people, without undergoing to a traditional process made by the National Commission for Culture and the Arts. A few years later, it was clarified that fashion design is under the category of Design in the National Artists roster, making Moreno eligible to be conferred the award in the future through the traditional conferment process.

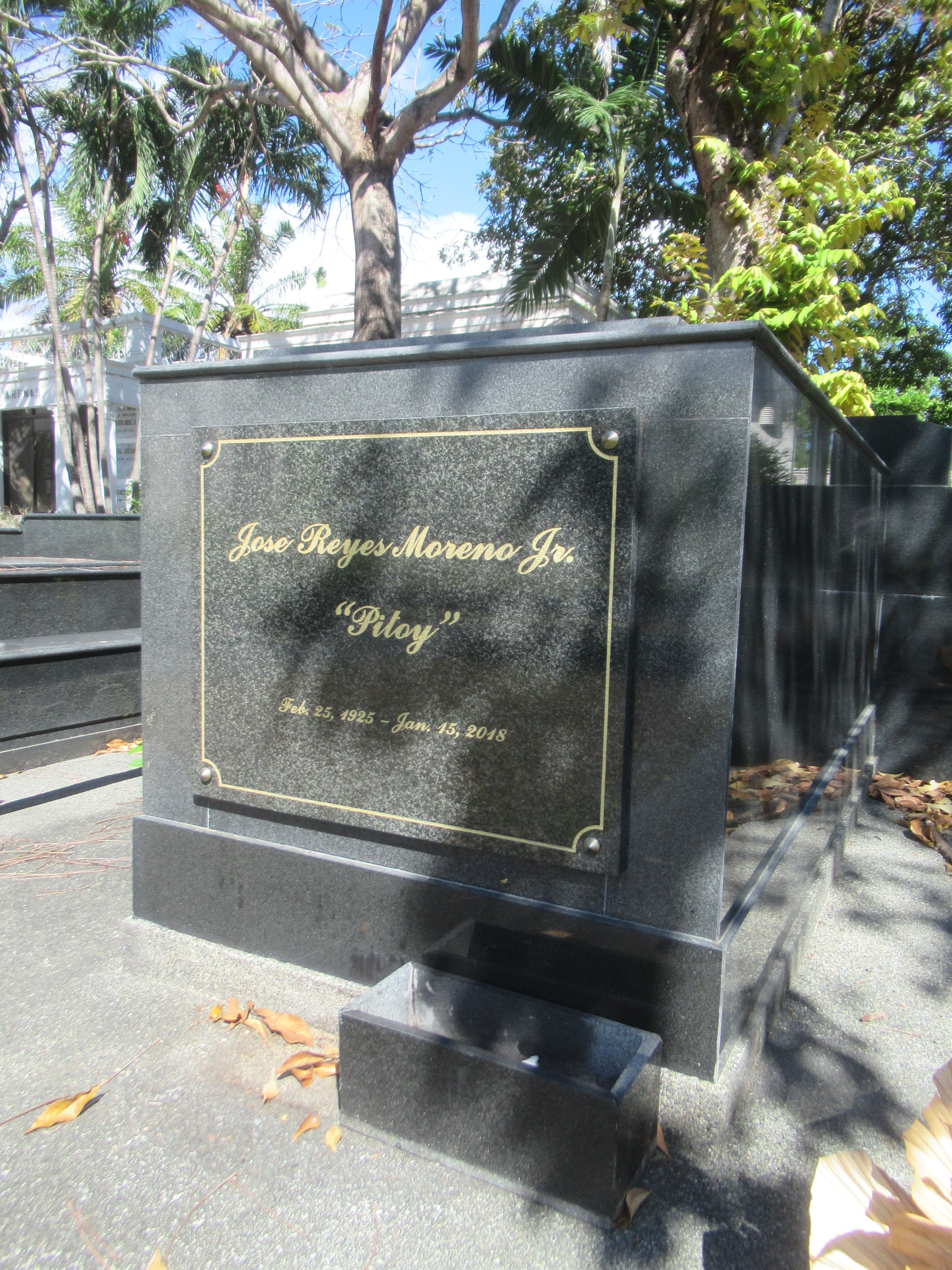
Moreno's grave at Manila Memorial Park – Sucat.

== Death ==
Moreno died on 15 January 2018, at the Manila Doctors Hospital, where he had been confined for the past few years for debilitating ailments. It was later confirmed that he died due to heart attack. Prior to his death, he has been called a "pillar of Philippine fashion" and "a significant cog of Philippine society". His remains were brought to his final resting place at the Manila Memorial Park.

== See also ==
- List of fashion designers from the Philippines
