= Wilfrido Ma. Guerrero =

Filipino theatre director and writer (1911–1995)

Wilfrido María Guerrero
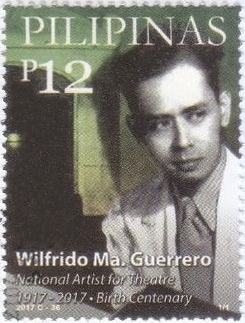
- Born: Wilfrido María Guerrero; January 22, 1910; Ermita, Manila, Philippine Islands
- Died: April 28, 1995 (aged 85); Manila, Philippines
- Occupation(s): Playwright; Director; Theater artist
- Known for: Theater; Order of National Artists of the Philippines, 1997

Wilfrido María Guerrero (January 22, 1910 – April 28, 1995) was a Filipino playwright, director, teacher and theater artist. He wrote over 100 plays, 41 of which have been published. His unpublished plays have either been broadcast on the radio or staged in various parts of the Philippines.

Guerrero's plays can be found in various anthologies: 13 Plays (first published in 1947), 8 Other Plays (1952), 7 More Plays (1962), 12 New Plays (1975), My Favorite 11 Plays (1976), 4 Latest Plays (1980), and Retribution and eight other selected plays (1990). Guerrero also published a family memoir, The Guerreros of Ermita (1988).

Guerrero taught and trained many notable figures in Philippine performing arts: Behn Cervantes, Celia Diaz-Laurel, Joy Virata, Tony Mabesa and Joonee Gamboa.

== Biography ==
Guerrero was born in Ermita, Manila. He wrote his first play at the age of 14 in Spanish, entitled No Todo Es Risa. This play was produced at the Ateneo de Manila University when he was 15.

Guerrero later worked as a reporter and proofreader for La Vanguardia, a Spanish newspaper, and as a drama critic for the Manila Tribune. He also worked for some time in the Philippine film industry as a scriptwriter. He served as director of the Filipino Players from 1941 to 1947. In 1947 he was appointed as director of the Dramatic Club of the University of the Philippines despite not having a degree, and he held that position for sixteen years.

In 1962, he organized and directed the U.P. Mobile Theater, which traveled around the Philippines to give performances.

Several of Guerrero's plays have been translated into and produced in Chinese, Italian, Spanish, Tagalog, Visayan, Ilocano and Waray. Six of his plays have been produced abroad: Half an Hour in a Convent at the Pasadena Playhouse, California; Three Rats at the University of Kansas; Condemned in Oahu, Hawaii; One, Two, Three (premiere performance) at the University of Washington, Seattle; Wanted: A Chaperon at the University of Hawaii; and Conflict in Sydney, Australia.

He is the first Filipino to have a theater named after him within his lifetime, the Wilfrido Ma. Guerrero Theater of the University of the Philippines.

=== Writing career ===
It was Guerrero's favorite aunt, Maria Araceli, who discovered his writing ability. When he was 12 or 13 she noticed him writing on scraps of paper and then hiding them inside his cabinet drawer.

After his aunt's death, Guerrero wrote some of his most popular comedies, "Movie Artists," "Basketball Fight," and "Wanted: A Chaperone." He also made her the basis for the principal characters in "Forever" (Maria Teresa) and "Frustrations" (Maria Araceli). “Both women are like my aunt: imperious, strong-willed, wise, but also humane,” he wrote.

=== Awards ===
Guerrero received three national awards: the Rizal Pro-Patria Award in 1961, the Araw ng Maynila Award in 1969, and the Republic Cultural Heritage Award in 1972.

The U.P. Mobile Theater received two awards when he was director: The Citizen's Council for Mass Media Trophy (1966) and the Balagtas Award (1969).

== See also ==
- Jose Y. Dalisay Jr.
- Severino Montano
- Rene Villanueva
