= Manuel A. Zamora =

Filipino chemist, pharmacist (1870–1929)

- Born: March 28, 1870; Santa Cruz, Manila, Captaincy General of the Philippines
- Died: July 10, 1929 (aged 59)
- Resting place: Manila Memorial Park – Sucat, Paranaque, Philippines
- Citizenship: Filipino
- Education: Ateneo Municipal, University of Santo Tomas
- Known for: Tiki-tiki
- Spouse: Baltazara Mangali
- Children: Marciano and Felicidad
- Scientific career
- Fields: Chemistry, Pharmacy
- Workplaces: Botica de Quiapo, University of Santo Tomas, Centro Escolar University

Manuel A. Zamora (1870-1929) was a Filipino chemist and pharmacist best known for his discovery of the tiki-tiki formula against beriberi.

== Personal life and education ==
Zamora was born on March 29, 1870, in Santa Cruz, Manila to Marciano Zamora and Martina Molo Agustin. Coming from an affluent family, he finished his primary education at the Ateneo Municipal. He then took up Pharmacy in the University of Santo Tomas (UST). Even as a student in UST, he was already engaged in various award-winning research works which culminated in his graduation in 1896, sobresaliente. Aside from this, he was also an apprentice in Botica de Quiapo where he was trained to compound and dispense medicine.

He married Baltazara Mangali with whom he had two children named Marciano and Felicidad. His granddaughter Virginia "Jennie" Zamora is a member of the executive committee of the Philippine General Hospital Medical Foundation Inc.

Zamora died on July 9, 1929.

== Career ==
Zamora became an assistant professor of organic chemistry in UST in 1901, rising to the position of associate professor and then to full professor later on. He opened his own drugstore and laboratory in Quiapo, Manila in 1908. It was in this laboratory where he would develop the tiki-tiki formula in 1909. Derived from rice polishings, tiki-tiki is high in Vitamin B1 and was effective in treatment of babies with beriberi. He got an offer from Parke-Davis in New York City for patent rights but he refused.

In the 1930s, Zamora was also formulating and selling other medications such as:

- Neuro-vitol - medicine for neurasthenia, insomnia, headache, and general debility
- Fosfatado Zamora jarabe yodo-tonico (lit. 'Zamora's phosphated iodine-tonic syrup') - a phosphated iodine tonic syrup for weakness, rheumatism, anemia, and tuberculosis
- Castoria con tiki-tiki (lit. 'Tiki-tiki with castoria') - a formulation of tiki-tiki with castoria for constipation among children

== Research works ==
- "Materia Farmaceutica Animal y Mineral" (1891-1892)
- "Materia Farmaceutica Animal Vegetal" (1893-1894)
- "Estudio Farmacologico de la Areca Cateru y Determinacion de Uno o Varios de sus Alkaloides"
- "Purificacion de mil Granos del Acido Sulfurico del Comercio"

== Medicinal cures ==
- vino ye
- Vino yodo-tanico fosfatado Zamora
- Vino estimulante nutritivo
- Vino estimulante nutrivino con tiki-tiki Zamora
- Gonorrema Zamora
- Lustora
- Alis galis
- Mil flores pomade
- Elixir digestive estomacal
