= Amelia Lapeña-Bonifacio =

Filipino playwright (1930–2020)

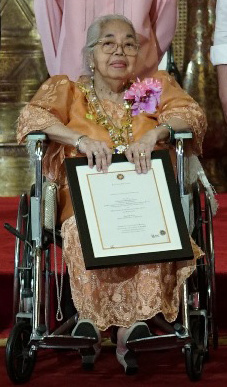
- Lapeña-Bonifacio during her National Artist conferment in 2018
- Born: Amelia Lirag Lapeña; 4 April 1930; Binondo, Manila, Insular Government of the Philippine Islands, U.S.
- Died: 29 December 2020 (aged 90); Manila, Philippines
- Resting place: Libingan ng mga Bayani, Taguig, Metro Manila, Philippines
- Known for: Founder of Teatrong Mulat ng Pilipinas
- Spouse: Manuel Flores Bonifacio
- Awards: National Artist of the Philippines for Theater (2018)

Academic background
- Education: University of the Philippines Diliman; University of Wisconsin–Madison

Academic work
- Discipline: Theatre Arts
- Institutions: University of the Philippines Diliman

Amelia Lirag Lapeña-Bonifacio (4 April 1930 – 29 December 2020) was a Filipino playwright, puppeteer, and educator known as the "Grande Dame of Southeast Asian Children's Theatre". In 1977, she founded a children's theater troupe, Teatrong Mulat ng Pilipinas (Mulat Theater), the official theater company and puppetry troupe of the University of the Philippines. Lapeña-Bonifacio served as the President of the International Association of Theatre for Children and Young People-Philippines (ASSITEJ-Philippines) and Union Internationale de la Marionnette-Philippines (UNIMA-Philippines). She was recognized in 2018 as a National Artist of the Philippines for Theater.

== Biography ==
Lapeña-Bonifacio, known as Tita Amel to her students, was born in Binondo, Manila and attended Arellano North High School. In 1953, she completed her first degree, a bachelor's degree at the University of the Philippines Diliman in literature with an interest in set design. In 1956, she became a Fulbright scholar and obtained her Master of Arts degree in speech and theatre arts at the University of Wisconsin-Madison in 1958. She wrote her first play, Sepang Loca, in 1957 and followed this up with Rooms the following year. Both works won awards in the Wisconsin Playwrighting Competition and were staged at the University of Wisconsin Play Circle Theater, with the author herself designing Sepang Loca. The two plays were later published in literary journals in the United States.

In the early stage of her career, she studied Japanese traditional theatre (supported by Office of Asian Pacific Affairs ASPAC), South East Asian traditional theatre (supported by the Ford Foundation), and international children’s theatre (supported by the Toyota Foundation). Her research into traditional theatre of the Philippines was supported by the University of the Philippines' Office of Research Coordination, Zarzuela Foundation of the Philippines, Inc., and the American Philosophical Society. This research convinced her of the necessity of a theatre for young audiences using Asian and Filipino folktales and utilizing puppets inspired by Japanese Bunraku and Indonesian wayang (rod puppets and shadow theatre styles).

=== Early career ===
As a young faculty member, she helped establish the Speech and Drama Department of the University of the Philippines - Diliman in 1959 and taught subjects such as History of the Theatre and Fundamentals of Speech in the early 1960s until she moved to the Department of English and Comparative Literature.

In 1976, Lapeña-Bonifacio published Anim na Dulang Pilipino Para Sa Mga Bata, with her six-year-old daughter supplying illustrations.

In 1977, Lapeña-Bonifacio wrote and directed her first children's play: Abadeja: Ang Ating Sinderela, a puppet play based on a Visayan folktale about the Cinderella-like Abadeja. It was performed in cooperation with Dulaang UP, the theater group of the University of the Philippines Speech and Drama Department, and was favorably reviewed in the press. With the enthusiasm of the cast's continued visits to her office and her long-standing dream of forming a children's theater group, Lapeña-Bonifacio founded the children's theater troupe Teatrong Mulat ng Pilipinas (Mulat; Aware Theatre of the Philippines), the official theater company and puppetry troupe of the University of the Philippines.

Lapeña-Bonifacio released Sepang Loca & Others, a first volume of works in English, in January 1981. Half of the collection is made up of five plays, while the rest consists of ten stories, several poems and essays.

Lapeña-Bonifacio created some controversy when she commented on Jim Henson's work; she stated that Henson's puppetry approach would not work on the other side of the globe due to three reasons: first, Sesame Street at the time engaged in some violence, secondly, the show’s scenes were too short, whereas a child’s attention span could be held for a much longer time, and finally, the pie-in-the-face antics could be interpreted as a sign of disrespect. Lapeña-Bonifacio added, "If kids have a short attention span, then how come our children back home can watch puppet shows for an hour? And, please, stop throwing all that food around. If that is funny to you Westerners, food for us Asians is almost sacred—it can be a matter of life or death." Some time after these comments, Henson created a full-length puppetry-packed movie, The Dark Crystal, which had Asian themes such as peace-building and equilibrium between the yin and the yang.

During the Marcos dictatorship, Lapeña-Bonifacio's theatre company released Ang Paghuhukom, based on the Pampanga folktale of the animal kingdom, which criticized the martial law regime. The main character, the ape king of the jungle, kept smashing the other animals to enforce silence and control, until he ended up smashing himself. The government noticed the theatre company, but only after the dictator's wife, Imelda Marcos, saw one play, Manok at Lawin, at Quirino Grandstand. The first lady, unknowing of the Ang Paghuhukom play at the time, tasked the Cultural Center of the Philippines to fund Lapeña-Bonifacio's theatre company.

Mulat, the theatre company, was invited to the International Workshop On Living Children’s Theatre in Asia (1978), where performances in eighteen sites in Japan gained media attention. At the International Puppet Festival in Tashkent, former USSR (1979), Mulat premiered The Trial to acclaim. In 1980, with Tokyo-based Ohanashi Caravan, Mulat toured Metro Manila and provinces, and the group participated in International Workshops On Living Children’s Theatre in the Philippines (1983), Malaysia (1985), Thailand (1987), and Indonesia (1989).

In 1985, Lapeña-Bonifacio's Papet Pasyon (Puppet Passion Play) was staged for the first time. The play translates the Filipino tradition of reciting the death and resurrection of Jesus into a puppet version for children, and has been staged annually since 1985. It was initially performed at the Cultural Center of the Philippines and was later staged at the University of the Philippines, Intramuros, and other provinces.

=== Later years ===
The 1991 Mount Pinatubo eruption which devastated numerous provinces in the Philippines highly influenced Lapeña-Bonifacio's craft. Through the University of the Philippines College of Medicine's advice, the Teatrong Mulat showed Pinatubo's traumatized children their plays to help the children in coping with the horrors caused by the eruption. In the next few years, Mulat performed in 30 refugee or relocation sites in Pampanga and Zambales. Each site would have approximately 100 children.

Lapeña-Bonifacio's theatre company presented Sita & Rama: Papet Ramayana in 2004 which interpreted the Indian epic Ramayana through shadow and rod puppetry with music by Joey Ayala and Cynthia Alexander and directed by Lapeña-Bonifacio's daughter, Amihan Bonifacio-Ramolete.

Land, Sea and Sky, a 1991 play, was re-launched by the theatre company in 2012 to raise awareness of various environmental concerns that the country is facing.

Lapeña-Bonifacio retired from the University of the Philippines in 1995, after thirty-six years teaching at the university; she was appointed a Professor Emeritus.

== Recognition ==
In 1995, she received the Carlos Palanca Memorial Award in Literature for One Act Play for Dalawang Bayani.

In 2005, the National Commission for Culture and the Arts have awarded her the Pama-As Gintong Bai Award, presented to her and 30 other women by President Gloria Macapagal Arroyo. In 2006, a house near the University of the Philippines, which served as Mulat's 100-seat base, was rebuilt and reopened as the Amelia Lapeña-Bonifacio Teatro Papet Museo (Puppet Museum) through government funding and grants from former presidents Fidel V. Ramos and Joseph E. Estrada.

A memorable recognition of her work occurred in Bangkok, Thailand, in 2009 at the International Puppetry Festival. A journalist noted that during a break in the performance of The Ramayana, "the performers approached her (she had been placed in the front row), clasped their palms, bowed and kissed her on both cheeks. When, misty-eyed, she kissed them back, the audience rose to their feet."

In February 2010, the University of the Philippines’ Department of Speech Communication and Theatre Arts conferred on her the title "Mother of Philippine Puppetry" to recognize Lapeña-Bonifacio's efforts in promoting Philippine stories and Asian puppetry and eventually creating a Philippine puppet tradition.

In 2017, she received the City of Manila Outstanding Citizen Award and the Quezon City Most Outstanding Citizen Award in 2013.

On 24 October 2018, Amelia Lapeña-Bonifacio was formally declared by the government as a National Artist of the Philippines, the highest distinction and honor conferred by the republic to Filipino artists. At the time, she had written 44 plays, 28 of these for children; 136 short stories, mostly for children and young adults; and 26 books, including a 2014 novel for young readers about World War II, In Binondo, Once Upon a War, written from the point of view of an 11-year-old child. She also wrote essays, speeches, poems and songs. In a 2019 interview, she hinted of a possible collaboration with fellow National Artist Ryan Cayabyab, to whom she had "already sent" an original script for him to make a musical from, adding, "I hope he's writing it now."

== Personal life ==
Lapeña-Bonifacio was the daughter of Gregorio Lapeña y Bañez and Paz Lirag y Mercado. She was married to Manuel Flores Bonifacio, a professor of sociology. They had a daughter, Amihan Bonifacio-Ramolete, who became the leader of Teatrong Mulat in 2012 and later the Dean of the College of Arts and Letters at the University of the Philippines.

She died on the early morning of 29 December 2020 at the age of 90.
