= Sofia Vokalensemble =

Swedish chamber choir

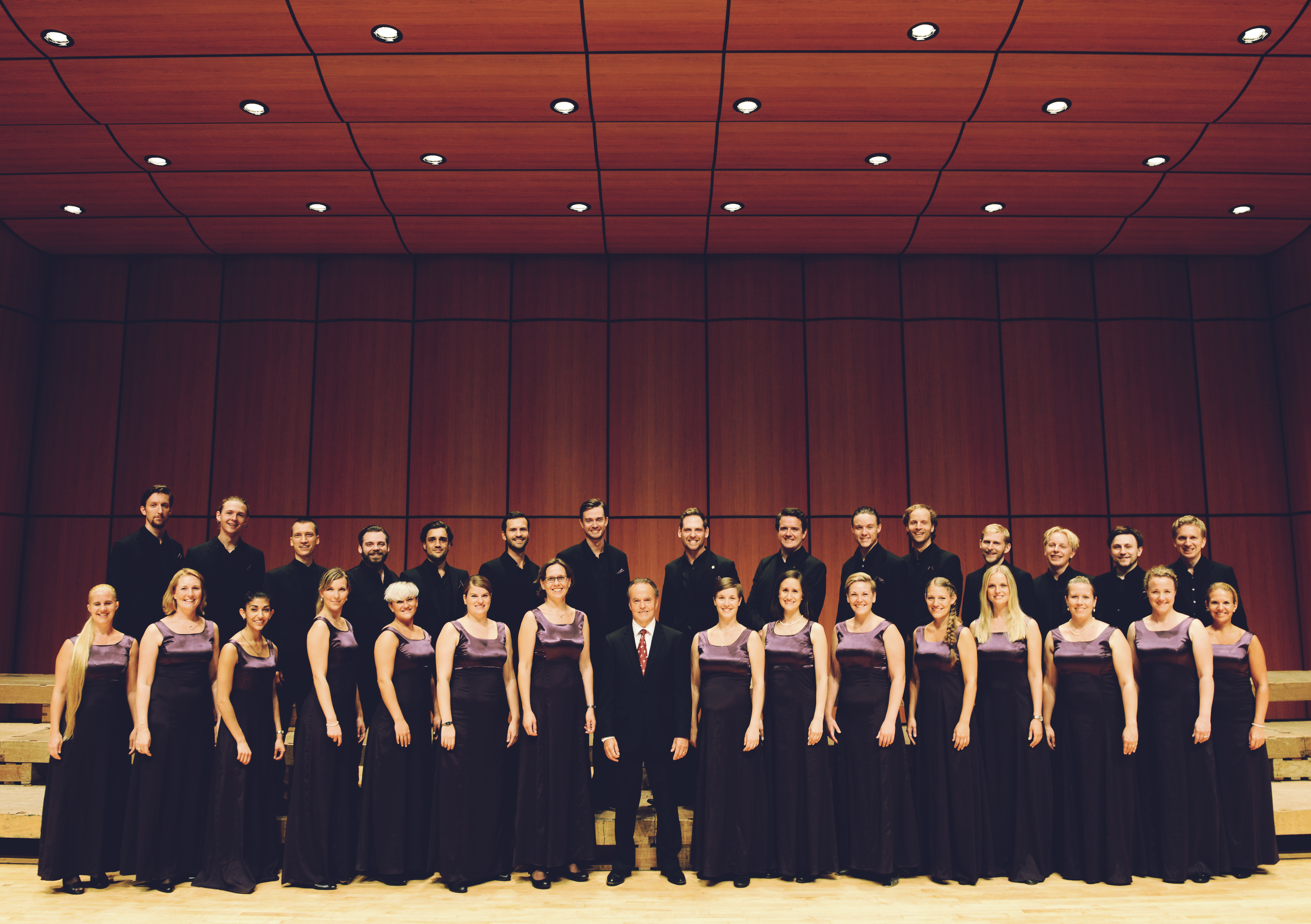
Sofia Vokalensemble in 2014

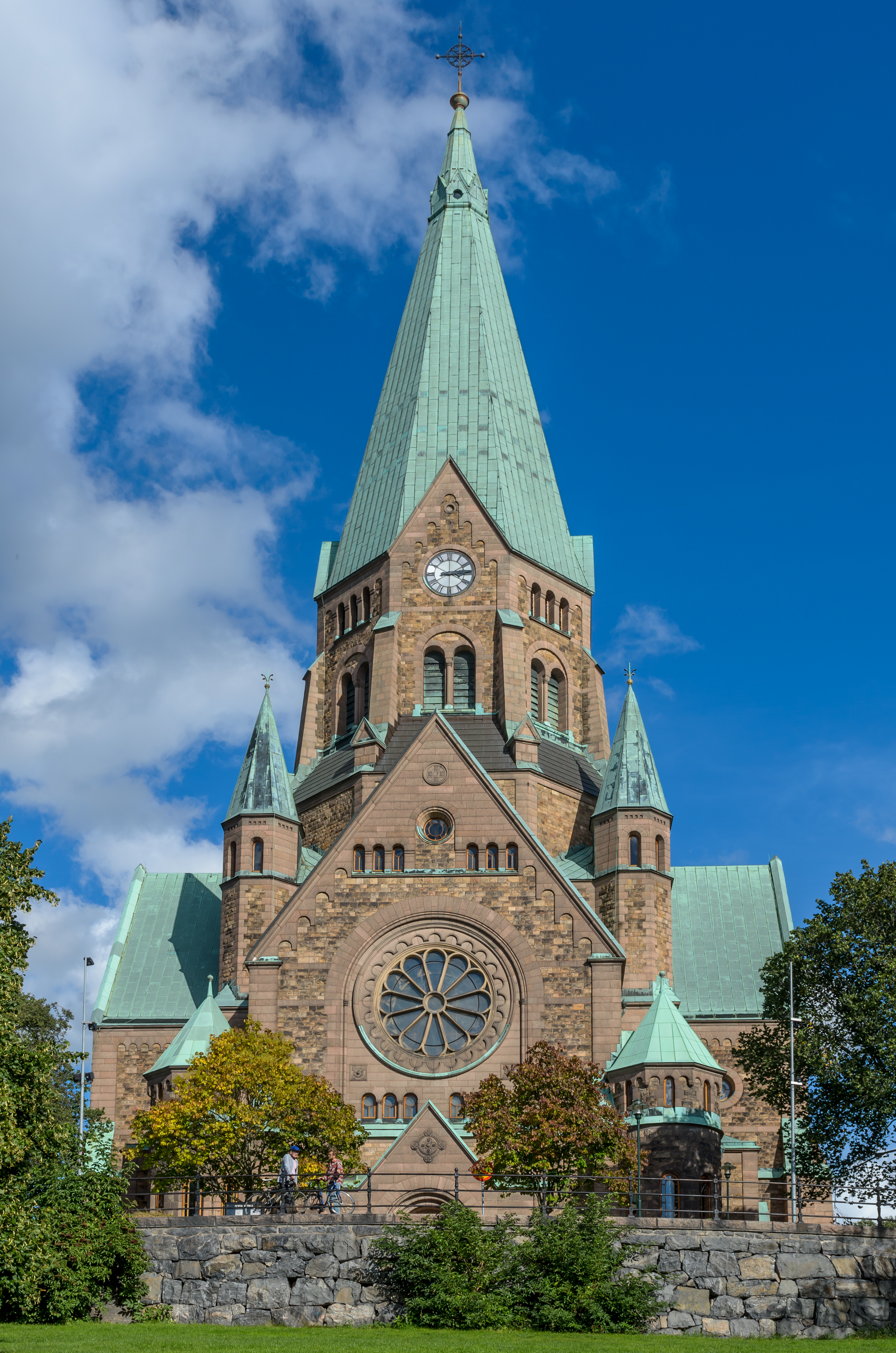
Sofia Church in Stockholm, Sweden, where Sofia Vokalensemble is based

Sofia Vokalensemble (often abbreviated as SOVE) is a mixed chamber choir based in the Sofia Church in the Sofia parish in Stockholm, Sweden. The choir in its present form was founded in 1995 by conductor Bengt Ollén who still leads the artistic work.

In 2012 Sofia Vokalensemble won the 24th European Grand Prix for Choral Singing in Maribor, Slovenia, competing in the final against four other winners of major 2011 international choral competitions. In 2015 Sveriges Radio, the Swedish public-broadcasting system that frequently records and broadcasts Sofia Vokalensemble's performances, appointed the choir as Sweden's representative in Let the Peoples Sing (LTPS), an international choir competition organized by the European Broadcasting Union (EBU).

== The choir ==
=== Organization ===
Sofia Vokalensemble performs both within the framework of the parish's work and in collaboration with external partners. The choir is a non-profit organization with bi-annual General Meetings and a Board of Directors. Most of the 32 singers started singing in choirs before the age of 10 and are now between 20 and 40 years old; many have received their choral and music training at Adolf Fredrik's School of Music, Stockholms Musikgymnasium, Södra Latin and/or other music institutions in the Stockholm region.

=== Repertoire ===
The repertoire consists of both new and old choral music, such as works by Bach, Mahler, Poulenc, Pärt and Schnittke. The choir has performed world premieres by the established Swedish composers Fredrik Sixten, Stefan Klaverdal and Karin Rehnqvist, Swedish soprano saxophonist Anders Paulsson, Norwegian composer Ola Gjeilo and Finnish composer Jaakko Mäntyjärvi, as well as "rising stars" such as Jacob Mühlrad and some of the choir's own members.

=== Choral work ===
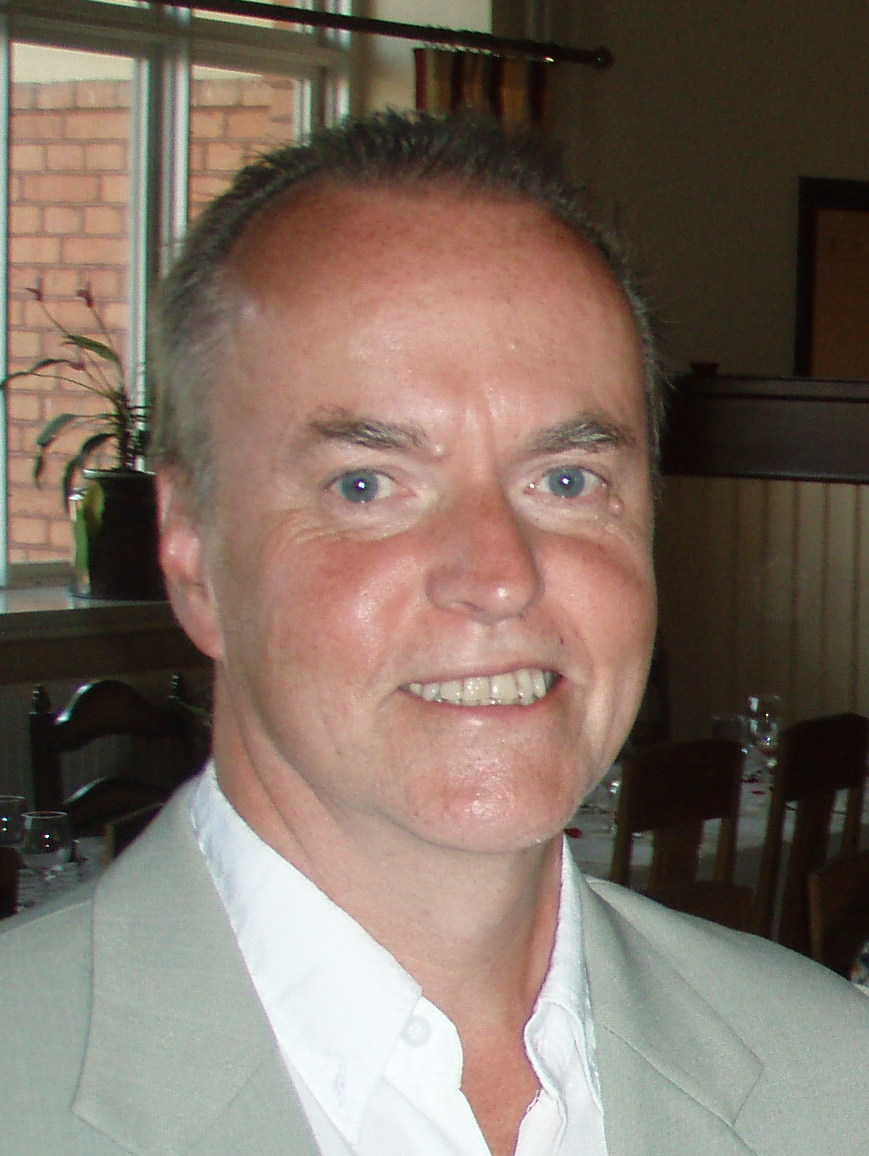
Sofia Vokalensemble's conductor Bengt Ollén in 2013

The working style is collaborative. The choir members all help out with the choice of repertoire, musical scores, food and drink, marketing och stage costumes. (Note: Information drawn from the program for the choir's 20-year jubilee concert in Sofia Church on May 24, 2015) Rehearsals are usually one evening per week and the choir meets for a weekend retreat at an external location about twice per year. Sometimes massage is included in the warmup for practice. During rehearsals, Bengt Ollén works actively with the voices and challenges the choir members to sing without the score. To foster security and trust between choir members they practice singing in small groups, eye to eye, ear to ear or with varying temperamental expressions and improvisations.

For each new concert or tour, a project leader is appointed, drawn from the members of the choir. During tours each new hotel means new roommates. "Secret buddies" are drawn by lottery so that each choir member must take extra care of the person whose name appears on the lottery ticket. Says one choir member: "Above all we try to be kind to each other".

Over the years Sofia Vokalensemble has often been invited to present their working method at international workshops, and the choir is host to visiting foreign choir leaders who wish to follow the rehearsal work. Says Ollén: "The vision is to create music beyond the score. The music performed by the choir should not be just beautiful tones and neat musical interpretation. The music must also affect the listener. Therefore each singer is an important part of the musical work".

== International tours and competitions ==
Sofia Vokalensemble has toured extensively both in Sweden and abroad. The following is a list of the choir's international tours:

Year	Country	Description	Competition result / notes
1996	Russia	Tour with concerts in western Russia	
1998	Venezuela	Tour	
1999	Greece	International Competition of Sacred Music in Preveza	Received gold medal in the category Chamber Choirs – Mixed Voices, silver medal in the category Chamber Choirs – Women Section, silver medal in the category Chamber Choirs – Male Section, special prize for "Best Performance of Orthodox Chant”.
1999	Italy	Tour on Sicily	Received Special International Award of the Jury,
2000	Ireland	Cork International Choral Festival in Cork	Fleischmann International Trophy Competition: 3rd with 90.9 points, 0.8 points behind the winner
2000	Hong Kong	Tour	
2000	Italy	Tour on Sicily	
2001	Italy	Tour on Sicily	
2003	Slovenia	Tour	
2004	Germany	3rd Choir Olympics in Bremen	Gold medals and best European Choir in the classes Mixed Chamber Choirs, Musica Sacra a capella and Musica Contemporanea.
2006	Finland	II International Harald Andersén Chamber Choir Competition in Helsinki	Shared podium with the Hungarian Victoria Chamber Choir
2007	South Africa	Tour	
2008	Italy	47th International Choral Competition "C.A. Seghizzi" in Gorizia	Winner of two categories, 2nd prize in the Grand Prix final
2009	Norway	Grieg International Choir Festival in Bergen	Grand Prix winner and elected the best choir of the competition; 1st prize in the category Contemporary music
2010	Poland	Szczecin Choir Festival	
2011	Slovenia	11th International Choral Competition in Maribor	Winner of the Grand Prix, 1st prize in both the compulsory and in the free program, qualified for the final of the European Grand Prix for Choral Singing in April 2012; conductor Bengt Ollén also took home two special awards for the conductor of the best performance of a composition by Jacobus Handl Gallus and the best performance of the contemporary compulsory Slovenian composition
2012	Slovenia	24th European Grand Prix for Choral Singing in Maribor	Winner of the final against four other winners of major 2011 international choral competitions
2012	Italy	La Fabbrica del Canto in Legnano	
2013	Czech Republic	Czech Choir Festival in Hradec Králové	
2014	South Korea	10th World Symposium on Choral Music in Seoul; also separate concerts in Seoul and Busan	
2015	France	Festival des Choeurs Lauréats in Provence	Tour received as a price for winning the European Grand Prix for Choral Singing in 2012
2016	France	Opera festival in Aix-en-Provence	Ladies only
2016	United Kingdom	Consert in the Royal Festival Hall, London	Ladies only
2016	Latvia Lithuania	Tour to Riga and Vilnius	Men only
2018	Lithuania	Festival Birštonas Cantat 2018 in Vilnius	
2019	Japan	Tour to Tokyo, Hiroshima, Kyoto and Karuizawa	Participated in Karuizawa International Choral Festival by special invitation by composer and conductor Ko Matsushita.

== Other noteworthy events ==
- 1995: Bengt Ollén founded the choir
- 2011: Represented Sweden as far as the semifinal in the choir competition Let the Peoples Sing, arranged by the European Broadcasting Union (EBU)
- 2014: Selected by the International Federation for Choral Music as IFCM ambassador for a period of three years and invited to participate in the 2014 10th World Symposium on Choral Music in South Korea.
- 2015: Represented Sweden in final of the choir competition Let the Peoples Sing, arranged by the European Broadcasting Union (EBU)

== Discography and broadcasts ==
Sofia Vokalensemble has recorded the following CDs:

- 2003: Black against white sky with music by i.a. Frank Martin and Eric Whitacre, Skivbolaget Silas Bäckström Produktion, BEF - 4806.
- 2009: The Darkness is No Darkness has a focus on contemporary American and British choral music, including four of James MacMillan's Strathclyde motets and Herbert Howells' Requiem, Footprint Records, FRCD047
- 2011: A Spotless Rose - Nordic Christmas contains Christmas music by Norwegian and Swedish composers with a mix of classical tunes and more contemporary works, Footprint Records, FRCD060
- 2012: Ett Svenskt Juloratorium (English: A Swedish Christmas Oratorio) where Sofia Vokalensemble has recorded a new oratorio by the Swedish composer Fredrik Sixten, Footprint Records, FRCD069
- 2014: Förvårskväll - One early spring evening contains Swedish and Nordic music where Swedish classical choral lyrics are mixed with modern compositions, Convivium Records, CR017 – includes the folk song Trilo
- 2019: In Paradisum contains Sofia Vokalensemble's "favourite and most frequently performed composers in pieces that depict perceived divinity", Footprint Records, FRCD112

As of October 2021 the choir had participated in nine television and 200 radio broadcasts that are on file at the Swedish Media Database, a search service for the audiovisual collections at the National Library of Sweden. The files include live radio broadcasts through the European Broadcasting Union.
