= Youth Choir BALSIS =

Youth choir in Latvia

- Choir
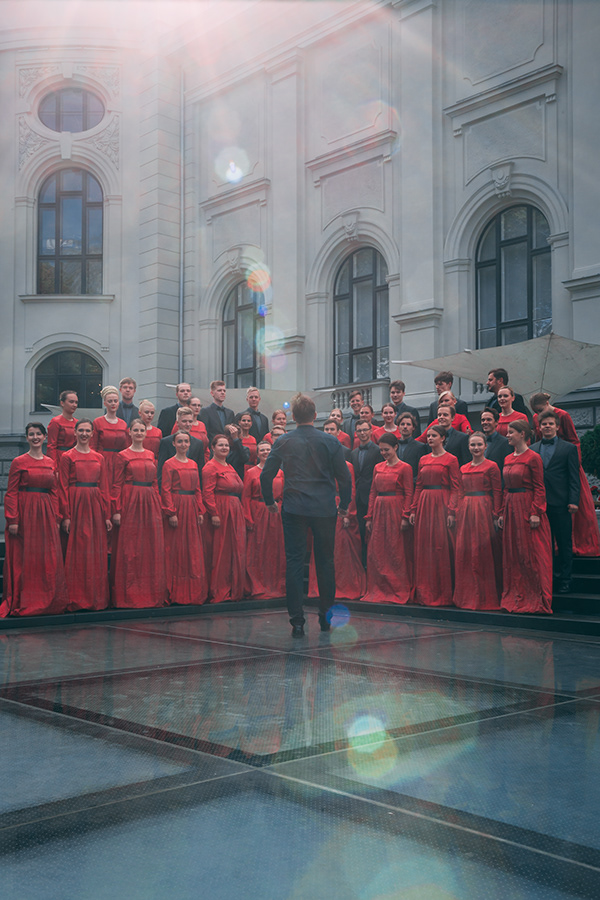
- Youth Choir BALSIS in 2018
- Origin: Riga, Latvia
- Founded: 1987 (39 years ago)
- Founder: Kaspars Putniņš, Māris Kupčs
- Genre: Classical
- Choirmaster: Amanda Gruško
- Chief conductor: Ints Teterovskis
- Headquarters: Small Guild, Riga, Latvia
- Awards: Grand Prix at the 35th International Choral Competition in Tolosa, Spain (2003)
- Website: balsis.lv/en

The Youth Choir BALSIS is a mixed youth choir in Riga, Latvia. The choir consists of some 50 young persons from Riga and other cities of Latvia who are permanent singers with the choir. The choir performs about 70 concerts every year in Latvian concert halls, churches and open-air venues.

Ints Teterovskis has been the artistic director of the Youth Choir BALSIS since 1998. BALSIS has released 18 compact disc albums. The Rolling Stone magazine has declared the album Christmas Joy in Latvia – Latvian Christmas Cantatas from 2008, created in collaboration with the New York Latvian Concert Choir and the New Chamber Orchestra of Riga, as one of the twenty-five greatest Christmas albums of all time. BALSIS is an innovative youth choir which regularly collaborates with local composers. As well, seeking new venues and audiences, it participates in a range of musical projects and challenges, such as concerts in the meat pavilion of the Riga Central Market, in train stations, on the river Daugava, within an historical gas tank etc. Each year the choir surprises listeners with its auditory and visual experimentation in its annual Christmas and Valentine's Day concerts and other projects.

BALSIS regularly undertakes overseas tours and participates in prestigious, international choir festivals and competitions. BALSIS has successfully given concerts in many parts of Europe (from Spain to Norway), USA (2002, 2014, 2025), Canada and Australia. In 2015 the choir also made its mark in Asia by participating in the IFCM Asia Pacific World Choral EXPO 2015 in Macau, China, where the choir gave concerts and masterclasses as a guest choir from Europe representing the traditions of European choral music.

== History ==
Youth choir BALSIS was established on 8 April 1987, by conductors Kaspars Putniņš and Māris Kupčs. It didn't take long until the choir received its first international success – already in 1991, the choir received Grand Prix at the BBC's Choral Recordings Competition "Let the People Sing". In the following years, the choir continued proving its quality, winning prizes in various local and international choir competitions, the most significant of them being 1st place in the IV International Competition in Neuchâtel, Switzerland (1992) and Grand Prix in the International Competition in Cantonigros, Spain (1995). Unfortunately, in 1996, due to various reasons, the choir, which was already recognized in the world, fell apart.
In the fall of 1996, one of the choir singer's Agita Ikauniece, who was still studying conducting in the Latvian Academy of Music, took the initiative to lead the choir. Shortly afterwards, Ints Teterovskis also joined the choir as the conductor. He became the conductor of BALSIS when Agita Ikauniece, his coursemate, who was sick at the time, asked him to replace her in one of the rehearsals.
Under the leadership of the new, enthusiastic conductors, the choir once again proved its musical quality, continuing to win awards in many competitions. A very notable achievement back at home was the First Prize in the chamber choir category of the 21st Latvian National Song and Dance Festival Choral Competition in Riga, Latvia, among 350 choirs (1998). Also, significant was Grand Prix at the 35th International Choral Competition in Tolosa, Spain (2003) that took the choir to European Grand Prix for Choral Singing in Gorizia, Italy (2004), where, in a very powerful competition, side by side with the world's best choirs, BALSIS won the second prize, conceding to youth choir "Kamēr...".
In the fall of 2006, the choir faced yet another change – not only did a lot of singers change but also the conductor Agita Ikauniece passed on her place to the new conductor of the choir — Valdis Tomsons. Over the next four years, the choir went on a concert tour to Australia (2006–2007, celebrating New Year's Eve far away from home), after the BALSIS visit, the singers of Australia established their own Australia Latvian Choir "Atbalsis". And in the summer of 2009, the choir visited another country far away from home – Canada, participating in the XII Latvian Song Festival in Hamilton.

In the fall of 2010, Valdis Tomsons passed on his place as a conductor to Laura Leontjeva. In the fall of the same year, BALSIS, representing the whole of Northern Europe, participated in the Polyfollia World Showcase for Choirs and Vocal Ensembles in Saint-Lô, France, and the performance of BALSIS was highly appreciated. In the fall of 2011, not only the conductor Laura Leontjeva, but also quite a few of the choir's singers concluded their work in the choir. But BALSIS, as always, didn't lose their musical quality, in 2011, the choir received yet another award – Third Prize in the folklore category at 43rd International Choral Competition in Tolosa, Spain.
You can hear BALSIS performing not only as a mixed choir. There's a tradition of the choir performing as separate choirs – male choir "Viņi" (as in "they", male) and women's choir "Viņas" (as in "they", female). Both choirs won first place in the 1st Emīls Dārziņš Choir Competition (2005) and second place in the 2nd Emīls Dārziņš Choir Competition (2009) In 2010, a vocal group was formed from some of the singers of BALSIS. The vocal group represented Latvia at the 2010 World Choir Competition in Shaoxing, China, receiving a gold medal in the folk program category and a silver medal in the mixed chamber choir category.

== Conductors ==
- Kaspars Putniņš (1987–1995)
- Māris Kupčs (1987–1995)
- Armands Zavadskis (1996)
- Agita Ikauniece (1996–2006)
- Valdis Tomsons (2005–2009)
- Laura Leontjeva (2010–2011)
- Zane Tāluma (2011–2013)
- Rihards Zariņš (2012–2014)
- Laima Vikmane (2014–2017)
- Elīna Čipāne (2017–2020)
- Laura Elizabete Godiņa (2020–2022)
- Kamila Siliņa (2022–2023)
- Georgs Zujevs (2022–2024)
- Dafne Jonāne (2024–2025)
- Amanda Gruško (since 2026)
- Ints Teterovskis (since 1998)

== Social projects ==
In 2005, the choir organized their own charity event "Siltie Ziemassvētki" ("Warm Christmas") – a series, consisting of five charity concerts, in which listeners were invited to donate their own handmade socks and mittens for children in orphanages. From 2009, with the Christmas concerts, a new campaign "Uzdāvini Pasauli" ("Give the World") was launched. This campaign provides an opportunity for the 60 most diligent students of Latvian orphanages to go on a trip to one of Europe's cultural and historical cities. The campaign ended in the fall of 2010, with sports and culture days organized by the choir in Latvian cities – Limbaži, Bauska, and Tukums, these events were attended by many orphans from all orphanages in Latvia.

In 2011, the choir started a new project, once a month participating in organizing cultural trips on the route Rīga-Gulbene-Alūksne-Rīga in association with AS "Pasažieru vilciens", restoring the tradition of People's Excursion trains, which was first started during the time while one of the first Latvian presidents Kārlis Ulmanis was in the office. Its main goal is to ensure the interest of passengers in the historical railway line section Gulbene-Alūksne and to prevent the closure of this historical railway line, as well as to encourage people to travel more actively around Latvia using trains.

== Discography ==
=== CD ===
- The Light of Christmas/Zvaigžņu Gaisma (2015)
- Nāc līdzās Ziemassvētkos (2012)
- Latvian Winterfest (2012)
- Missa a cappella 1 (2012)
- Red|SARKANS (2010)
- Georgs Frīdrihs Hendelis Oratorija "MESIJA" (fragmenti) (2010)
- Speciālizdevums – BALSU skaistāko skaņdarbu apkopojums (2010)
- Viktors Baštiks. Vokāli instrumentāli skaņdarbi (2010)
- Sadedzinātu sinagogu Melodijas (2009)
- Ziemassvētki sabraukuši (2008)
- Ziemas saulgrieži (2005)
- XXlll Vispārējie Dziesmu svētki (2003) Noslēguma koncerts
- Lolitas brīnumputns (2002)
- Bruno Skultes skaņdarbi (2001)
- Ziemassvētki pie Dzintarjūras (2000)
- Latviešu, lietuviešu un igauņu kora mūzikas kompaktdisks (1999)
- Mūzai (1998)
- Priecīgus Ziemassvētkus (1998)

=== DVD ===
- DVD "Top Latvijas Likteņdārzs!" (2010)
- Youth Choir BALSIS 25 (2012)

== Awards ==
- The Youth Choir BALSIS has participated at the World Choir Games, and won gold in the folk music category and silver in the chamber choir category at the 2010 World Choir Games in Shaoxing, China
- Third Prize in the folklore category at 43rd International Choral Competition in Tolosa, Spain (2011)
- Gold in the folk music category and Silver in the chamber choir category at the 2010 World Choir Games in Shaoxing / Shanghai, China
- Third Prize in the semi-professional choir category of the 24th Latvian National Song and Dance Festival Choral Competition in Riga, Latvia (2008)
- Second Prize – First International Choral Competition and Festival in Latvia (2007)
- Second Prize – 29th International Choral Competition in Varna, Bulgaria (2007)
- Prize awarded for best performance of a selected composition – 29th International Choral Competition in Varna, Bulgaria (2007)
- Prize awarded for best performance of a Bulgarian composition – 29th International Choral Competition in Varna, Bulgaria (2007)
- Third Prize – 50th International Habaneras and Polyphony Contest in Torrevieja, Spain (2004)
- Second Prize – European Grand Prix for Choral Singing in Gorizia, Italy (2004)
- Prize awarded by Ministry of Culture of the Republic of Latvia for outstanding achievements in choral music (2003)
- Grand Prix at the 35th International Choral Competition in Tolosa, Spain (2003)
- First Prize in the semi-professional choir category of the 23rd Latvian National Song and Dance Festival Choral Competition in Riga, Latvia (2003)
- First Prize – International Choral Competition in Spittal an der Drau, Austria (2002)
- First Prize – International Choral Competition in Tallinn, Estonia (2001)
- First Prize – International Choral Competition in Nordic-Baltic Choral Festival in Skien, Norway (2000)
- Grand Prix – Em. Melngailis Music Festival, Latvia (1999)
- First Prize in the chamber choir category of the 21st Latvian National Song and Dance Festival Choral Competition in Riga, Latvia (1998)
- First Prize in the semi-professional choir category of the 20th and 21st Latvian National Song and Dance Festival Choral Competition in Riga, Latvia (1990, 1998)
- Grand Prix – International Competition in Ventspils, Latvia (1997)
- Grand Prix – International Competition in Cantonigros, Spain (1995)
- First Prize – Fourth International Competition in Neuchâtel, Switzerland (1992)
- Grand Prix – BBC Choral Recordings Competition "Let the People Sing" (1991)
