= Let the People Sing =

Let the People Sing may refer to:

- Let the People Sing (novel), a 1939 novel by J.B. Priestley
- Let the People Sing (film), a 1942 British film adaptation of the novel directed by John Baxter
- Let the People Sing (contest), a choral contest organized by the BBC in the 1950s and 1980s
- Let the Peoples Sing, international choral competition
- Let the People Sing (album), an album by The Wolfe Tones 1972
- "Let the People Sing" (song), a song by Brian Warfield of The Wolfe Tones
