= University of Utah Singers =

Choral ensemble

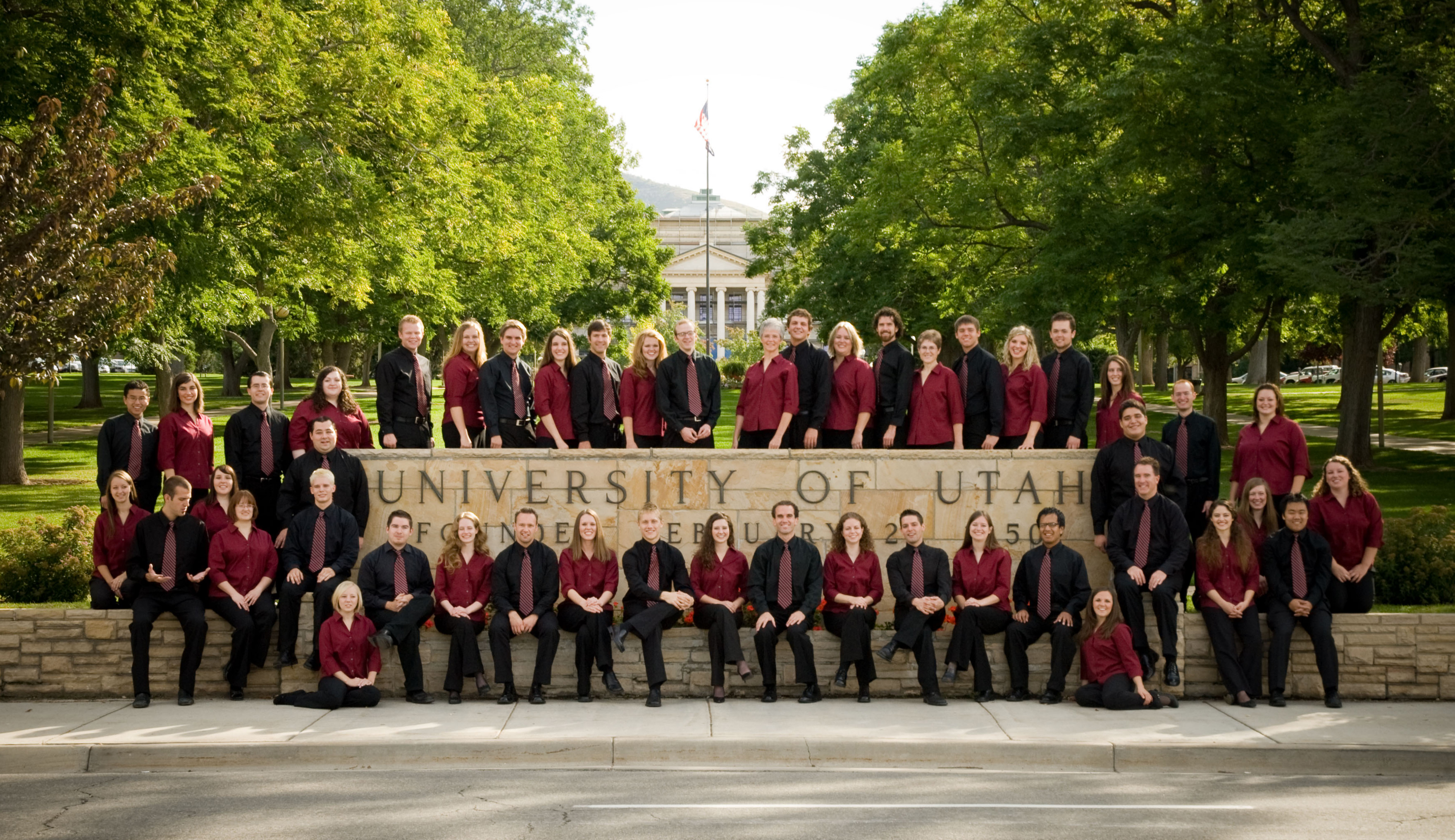
University of Utah Singers

The University of Utah Singers (UU Singers) was the premier choral ensemble at the University of Utah until 2010. The ensemble was organized in 2003 by Dr. Brady R. Allred. Composed of approximately 45 voices, the ensemble performed repertoire from a wide range of musical styles and eras. In their short history, UU Singers achieved both national and international acclaim, winning the Grand Prize at the 2005 Florilège Vocal de Tours -International Choir Competition in Tours, France; winning the European Grand Prix Choral Competition in Tolosa, Spain;in 2006, winning first prize at the 11th International Chamber Choir Competition Marktoberdorf in 2009, participating in the 19th Festival “Choralies de Vaison-la-Romaine” in France and the 37th Abu Gosh international vocal music festival near Jerusalem. UU Singers performed in concerts throughout England, France, Spain, the Netherlands, Italy, the Czech Republic, Hungary, Croatia, Slovenia, Austria, Germany and Israel on five international concert tours, and have appeared on French national television at the Nancy International Choir Festival.

In addition to their international appearances, UU Singers performed at division and national conventions of the American Choral Directors Association and Music Educators National Conference and was featured locally at state events, such as the inauguration of Governor Olene S. Walker, the 2004 opening session of the Utah State Senate and the dedication ceremony of the Marriott Library with former first lady Laura Bush. They have collaborated with the Grammy Award-winning Kronos Quartet and also collaborated regularly with Utah-based groups, including the 23rd Army Band, the Salt Lake Choral Artists, the Brigham Young University Singers and Concert Choir and the University of Utah Philharmonic, Wind Ensemble, A Cappella Choir and Women's Choir. They have performed in the Salt Lake Tabernacle, the Assembly Hall on Temple Square and the Cathedral of the Madeleine.

UU Singers premiered several new works, including William Hawley's “Flos ut rosa Floruit,” for which they received a prize for the best new work at the Tours competition. In 2007, they were selected by the Barlow Endowment for Music Composition to premiere Judith Bingham's “Ghost Towns of the American West” as part of an international performing consortium of choirs which included VocalEssence and the BBC Singers. In February 2009, UU Singers premiered new commission "Hail Holy Light" by Nancy Wertsch, in April 2009, they premiered new commission "Endless Song" by Imant Raminsh and in 2010 "Pa Kin Kin" by Guido Lopez Gavilan.

Since Dr. Allred's departure from the university at the end of 2010, this now 28-voice ensemble is conducted by professor Barlow Bradford. The ensemble is now known as the University of Utah Chamber Choir, renamed in 2012 in honor of Dr. Bernell W. Hales. The University of Utah Chamber Choir continues the high standards of musicianship and performance he set.

== Performances, Awards and Events ==
- Participated in the 37th Abu Gosh international vocal music festival in Israel - May 2010
- Performed at the Western Division Convention of the American Choral Directors Association, Tucson, AZ - March 2010
- Won first prize in the 11th International Chamber Choir Competition Marktoberdorf, special prize for best interpretation of a premiered work (Hail Holy Light by Nancy Wertsch) and served as the demonstration choir for the International Masterclass for Choral Conductors - June 2009
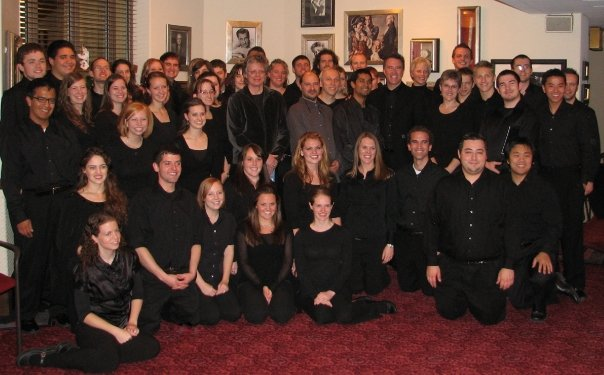
- University of Utah Singers with Kronos Quartet
  Performed Terry Riley's "Sun Rings" with the Grammy Award-winning Kronos Quartet - November 2008
- Participated in the 12th International Choir Festival en Provence, France - July 2007
- Participated in the Festival des Choeurs Lauréats, Vaison, France - July 2007
- Participated in the 19th Festival “Choralies de Vaison-la-Romaine” France - August 2007
- Performed at the American Choral Directors Association Western Division Convention, Salt Lake City, UT - 2006
- Performed at the National MENC Convention, Salt Lake City, UT
- Won the European Grand Prix for Choral Singing, European Grand Prix International Choir Competition, Tolosa, Spain June 2006
- Won several awards at the Florilège Vocal de Tours International Choir Competition, Tours, France - May 2005:
  - Grand Prix de la Ville de Tours (Grand Prize)
  - Le Premier Prix (First Prize) in the Free Program
  - La Deuxieme Prix (Second Prize) in the Mixed Choir category (No 1st prize given.)
  - Le prix "Ronsard" (The Ronsard Prize) for the Renaissance Program
  - Le prix "A Coeur Joie International" for the best French diction during the competition
  - Prix "OEuvre de Creation" for the best newly composed work in the competition.
- Participated in the Nancy International Choir Festival, Nancy, France
- Performed concerts in San Sébastien, Palais de Congrès, Salle Poirel, Centre Culturel, Pulnoy, Nancy Cathedral and Place Stanislas
- Other major performances around the world:
  - Vleuten, Utrecht (concert and workshop at Unisono), Weert, Venlo—The Netherlands
  - Nancy, Tours, Paris (St. Étienne du Mont), Brunoy, Strasbourg, Reiquewihr—France
  - Munich—Germany
  - Padova, Dolo, Venice (San Marco), Palaiai, Florence (Duomo), Mantova—Italy
  - High Wycombe, Watlington (London), Oxford, Wlverhampton, Birmingham-England

== History ==
The "Singers" was an outgrowth of the University of Utah Chamber Choir, the original premier small choral ensemble at the University of Utah, which was conducted for years by Dr. Bernell Hales (1920–2006) and generally had around twenty members performing music from various periods from Gregorian Chant and early Renaissance to modern, both sacred and secular, music in numerous languages. During his 21-year tenure conducting the Chamber Choir and teaching classes at the U, Professor Hales was known as an accomplished choral music arranger as well as a great and gifted musician. "Many current music educators were influenced by Dr. Hales as they took his choral methods, choral arranging, orchestration, elementary music methods, and other classes."

Of key importance to Dr. Hales was the concept of vowel modification and blending, and his choirs could be so in tune as to produce overtones. He was a conductor who brought the music to life through his techniques. Many of his students went on to conduct choirs at the public school as well as university level, teaching what they had been taught.

== Recordings ==
UU Singers has recorded 11 solo albums:

- Endless Song (Slovenia and Germany 2009)
- Alleluia - Sacred Choral Music (Libby Gardner Concert Hall, Himmelfahrtskirche, Knight's Hall of Brežice Castle 2004–2009)
- Cloths of Heaven (Libby Gardner Concert Hall 2007–2008)
- Carol of Joy (Libby Gardner Concert Hall 2007–2008)
- How Can I Keep From Singing? (Libby Gardner Concert Hall 2007)
- If Music Be the Food of Love (Libby Gardner Concert Hall 2006–2007, 2-disc set)
- Christmastide (Libby Gardner Concert Hall 2005–2006)
- Home on the Range (Libby Gardner Concert Hall 2005)
- A Jubilant Song (Munich, Germany 2005)
- Christmas Morn (Libby Gardner Concert Hall 2004)
- i thank You God for most this amazing day (Libby Gardner Concert Hall, Assembly Hall at Temple Square 2003)
