= Nilo Alcala =

Philippine-American composer

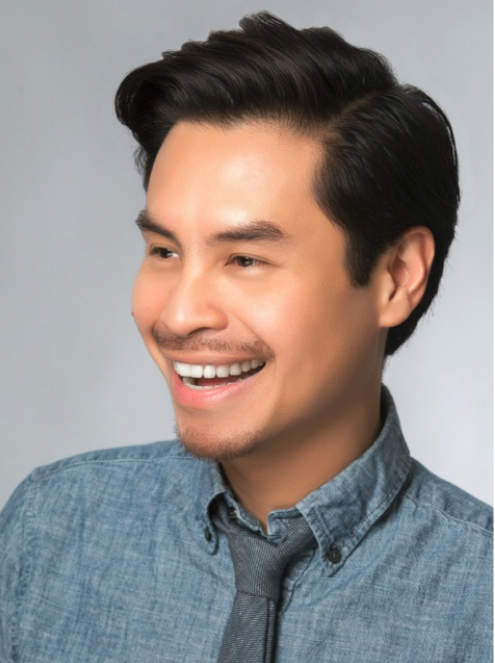

Background information
- Born: Nilo Belarmino Alcala II
- Origin: Lucena City, Philippines
- Genres: classical
- Occupations: composer, arranger, singer, conductor
- Instruments: voice, piano
- Website: http://niloalcala.com/

Nilo Alcala is a Filipino-American composer and 2019 The American Prize Winner in Composition. He is the first Philippine-born composer to be commissioned by Grammy winner Los Angeles Master Chorale, and also to receive the Aaron Copland House Residency Award.

== Biography ==
Alcala has received a number of recognitions, including the 2009 POLYPHONOS Young Composer Award given by the Seattle-based vocal ensemble, The Esoterics. He also received a Young Composer Award from the Asian Composers League, in cooperation with the Israel Composers' League in 2004. He won Best Movie Theme Song and was also nominated for Best Film Score at the 34th Metro Manila Film Festival for his music in the movie "Homecoming" by renowned Filipino director Gil Portes. For the same movie, Alcala also received nominations from the Golden Screen Awards of the Entertainment Press Society and the Star Awards for Movies of the Philippine Movie Press Club.

Alcala is the first ever Filipino to be commissioned by the Los Angeles Master Chorale. His work Mangá Pakalagián was premiered at the Walt Disney Concert Hall on November 15, 2015.

As an arranger, his work in the Sony BMG released Album Acclamation of the renowned Philippine Madrigal Singers was nominated for Best Vocal Arrangement at the 20th Awit Awards organized by the Philippine Association of the Record Industry or PARI.

Alcala was member/soloist and resident composer/arranger of the two-time European Choral Grand Prix winner and UNESCO Artist for Peace Philippine Madrigal Singers. The group has premiered Alcala's compositions in prestigious international festivals and competitions, including the Florilege Vocal de Tours in France, and the European Grand Prix for Choral Singing in Arezzo, Italy.

His works "Diary of a Synaesthete" and "Speak to me my love/You are the evening cloud" were chosen for premiere by the Metro Manila Community Orchestra during the Music UnderKonstruction concerts at Cultural Center of the Philippines in 2005 and 2006, respectively.

His compositions and arrangements have been performed by various choirs around the world, including: The World Youth Choir, Asia Pacific Youth Choir, San Francisco Girls Chorus (San Francisco, CA), NOTUS (Indiana, IL), and Stellenbosch University choir (South Africa).

He was member and resident composer of Philippine Madrigal Singers. Also, he has been honorary member of the, Phi Beta Delta Honor Society for International Student, Phi Kappa Phi and Pi Kappa Lambda (music honor society).

== Education ==
Alcala graduated BS Development Communication from the University of the Philippines Los Baños (BSDC 1999) prior to his admission in 2001 to the University of the Philippines Diliman College of Music. Upon graduating Bachelor of Music in Composition Magna cum laude in 2007, Alcala received the Gawad Chanselor Natatanging Mag-aaral (Chancellor's Outstanding Student Award), an award conferred by University of the Philippines to students with outstanding academic and non-academic achievements. Alcala became full scholar under the Billy Joel Fellowship at Syracuse University College of Visual and Performing Arts in upstate New York where he finished Masters in Music Composition and received the Irene Crooker Excellence in Music Award in 2009.

He has won fellowships and grants including: Billy Joel Fellowship (Syracuse University), National Commission for Culture and the Arts (NCCA), and Asian Cultural Council.

== Accomplishments ==
=== Awards/nominations ===
| Year | Award | Result |
|---|---|---|
| 2021 | Natatanging Lucenahin Performing Arts/Music Composition | Won |
| 2020 | 12th Ani ng Dangal | Won |
| 2019 | The American Prize | Won |
| 2018-17 | IGNITE: Commissioning Competition of C4: The Choral Composer/Conductor Collective | Won |
| 2016-17 | Copland House Residency Award | Won |
| 2009 | POLYPHONOS Young Composer Award (Seattle, USA) | Won |
| 2007 | Gawad Tsanselor Natatanging Mag-aaral (Outstanding Student Award), University of the Philippines | Won |
| 2006 | Prix Pour une ouvre de creation | Nominated |
| 2004 | Asian Composers League Young Composer Award | 2nd Prize |
| | INDEO Awards | Won |
| | 1st Ani ng Dangal (2009) Award | Won |
| | Irene Crocker Music Award – Syracuse University | Won |
| | Awit Awards | Nominated |
| | 24th Metro Manila Film Festival, Best Movie Theme Song | Won |
| | 24th Metro Manila Film Festival, Best Film Score | Nominated |
| | Star Awards, Original Theme Song of the Year | Nominated |
| | Golden Screen Awards, Movie Theme Song of the Year | Nominated |

== Selected works ==
=== Choral ===
| Sr. No | Work | Instrumentation | Year |
|---|---|---|---|
| 1 | Pater Noster | (treble choir) | 2003 |
| 2 | Dayo Dayo Kupita | (mixed choir) | 2006 |
| 3 | Kaisa-isa Niyan | (mixed choir) | 2006 |
| 4 | La Noche De Mil Noches | (mixed choir) | 2007 |
| 5 | Silly Syllables | (children's choir, 2 violins, piano) | 2008 |
| 6 | Bagbagto | (mixed choir, also in treble and male choir version, with optional wood percussion) | 2009 |
| 7 | Papanok A Lakitan | (mixed choir, optional wood percussion) | 2009 |
| 8 | Song of the Night | (mixed choir) | 2009 |

=== Vocal ===
| Sr. No | Work | Instrumentation | Year |
|---|---|---|---|
| 1 | Then Finish The Last Song | (soprano, piano) | 2008 |
| 2 | Tell Me If All This Be True | (soprano, piano) | 2009 |
| 3 | A Day Like This | (tenor, piano) | 2009 |
| 4 | A Burning | (tenor, mezzo-soprano, piano) | 2009 |
| 5 | Tell Me If All This Be True | (soprano, piano) | 2009 |

=== Orchestral ===
| Sr. No | Work | Instrumentation | Year |
|---|---|---|---|
| 1 | Diary of a Synaesthete | (orchestra) | 2005 |
| 2 | Speak To Me My Love/You Are The Evening Cloud | (soprano, tenor, orchestra) | 2007 |

=== Chamber/solo instrumental ===
| Sr. No | Work | Instrumentation | Year |
|---|---|---|---|
| 1 | Freudian Id | (string quartet) | 2003 |
| 2 | chuck d’ cheeky chat | (instrumental chamber ensemble) | 2004 |
| 3 | Dancing Delusions | (instrumental chamber ensemble) | 2005 |
| 4 | Stream of Consciousness | (instrumental chamber ensemble) | 2008 |
| 5 | The Tyranny of Distractions | (cello) | 2009 |

=== Musical theater ===
| Sr. No | Work | Year |
|---|---|---|
| 1 | Miracles of Jesus (children's choir, soloists, rock band) | 2007 |

=== Film/animation ===
| Sr. No | Work | Year |
|---|---|---|
| 1 | Train Station | 2015 |
| 2 | Bayang Magiliw Year | 2013 |
| 3 | Motion picture soundtrack for "Homecoming" (directed by Gil Portes) | 2003 |
| 4 | Animation soundtrack for "Flower Trail" 2004 | 2004 |

== Discography ==
| Sr. No | Title | Artist | Year |
|---|---|---|---|
| 1 | Onomatopoeia: The Choral Works of Nilo Alcala | Philippine Madrigal Singers | 2017 |

== Commissions ==
| Sr. No. | Title | Commissioning by (performer/ Organization) | World Premiere (date) | Place |
|---|---|---|---|---|
| 1 | Mangá Pakalagián | The Los Angeles Master Chorale | November 2015 | Walt Disney Concert Hall |
| 2 | The Magi’s Journey | San Bernardino Symphony Orchestra | December 2018 | San Bernardino, California |
| 3 | Sayáo sa Ilaoán | Manila Symphony Orchestra | 2017 | Manila, Philippines |
| 4 | Prisms and Windows | Aleron | 2017 | Barcelona, Spain |
| 5 | Crossing the Bar | C4: The Choral Composer/Conductor Collective | 2017 | Manhattan, New York |
| 6 | Song of the Night | The Esoterics | 2009 | Seattle, Washington |
| 7 | Bagong Umaga | National Music Competitions for Young Artists | 2005 | Cultural Center of the Philippines |
| 8 | Bagbagto | Children's Museum and Library | 2008 | Manila, Philippines |
| 9 | Papanok A Lakitan | Anglo-Chinese Junior College | 2009 | Esplanade Concert Hall in Singapore |
| 10 | Silly Syllables | Long Island Children's Choir | 2008 | Merkin Hall, New York City |
| 11 | Song of Dawn | Bangkok Voices | 2006 | Xiamen, China |
