= Bengt Ollén =

Swedish conductor

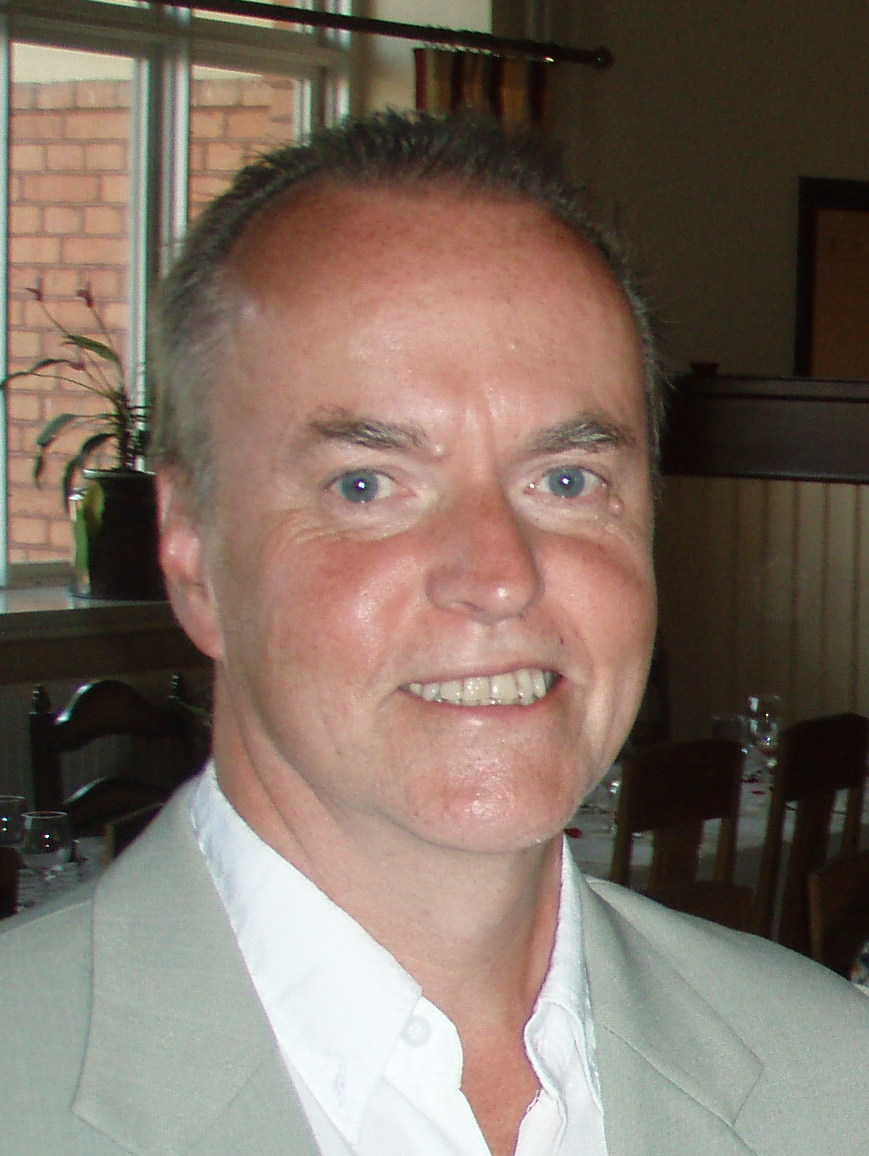
- Bengt Ollén in 2013
- Born: 17 August 1950 (age 76); Lidköping, Sweden
- Occupations: Choral conductor; Music teacher; Adjudicator; Lecturer

Bengt Ollén (born 17 August 1950) is a Swedish choral conductor, music teacher, adjudicator and lecturer. In 1995 Ollén founded Sofia Vokalensemble that has emerged as one of the world's leading amateur choirs.

== Career ==
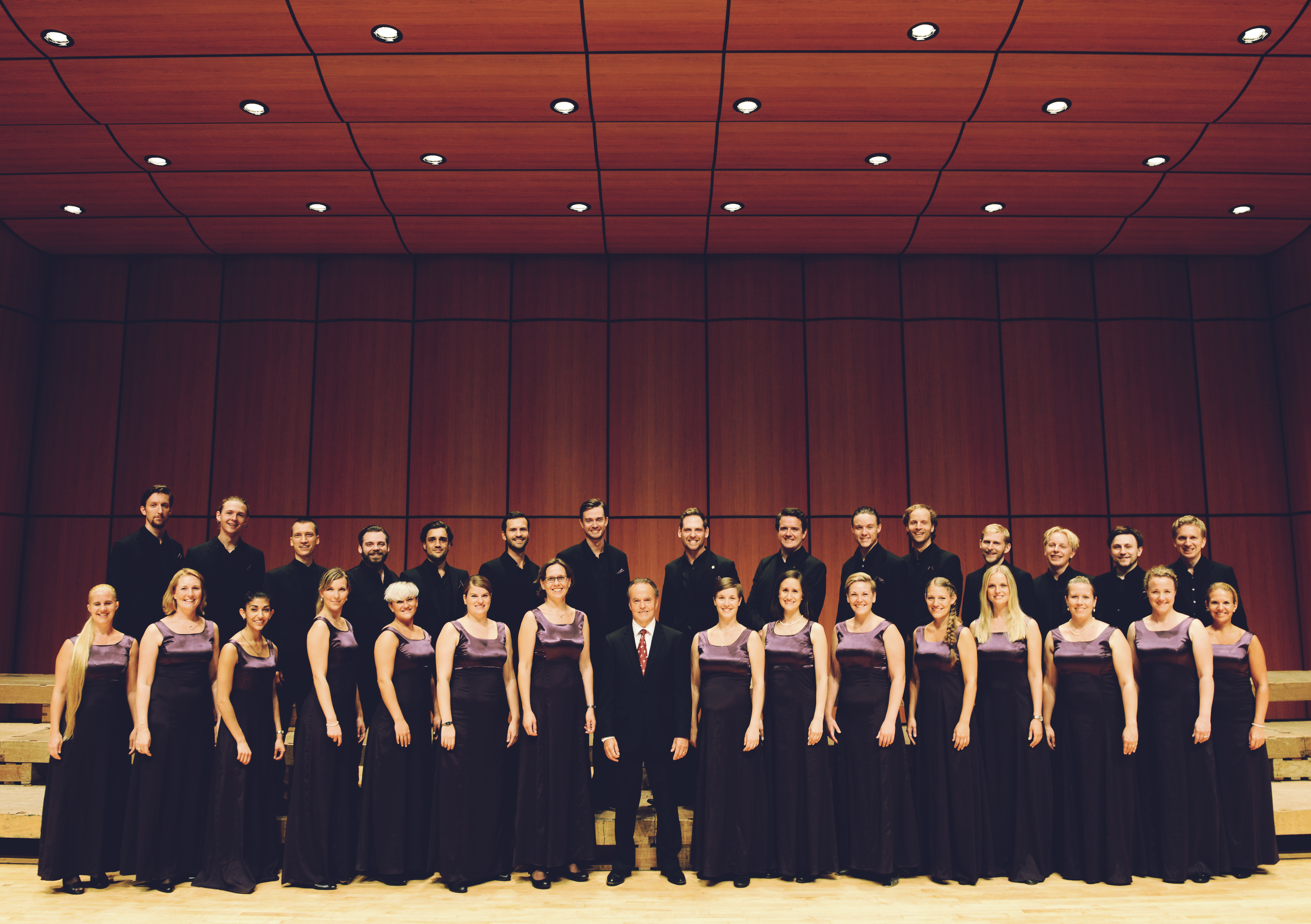
Bengt Ollén's choir Sofia Vokalensemble in 2014

Ollén was born in Lidköping, Sweden. After studying mechanical engineering at Chalmers University of Technology in Gothenburg Ollén received his Master's Degree in 1976. After briefly working at Swedish ball-bearing company SKF in Gothenburg he decided that he loved music more than mechanics. Ollén then studied music at the Högskolan för scen och musik at the University of Gothenburg in Sweden for professors Gösta Ohlin and Gunnar Eriksson. In 1981 he founded the still active vocal ensemble Amanda in Gothenburg, and in 1995 he founded Sofia Vokalensemble in Stockholm, that won the European Grand Prix for Choral Singing in 2012. In 2015 Sveriges Radio, the Swedish public-broadcasting system, appointed Sofia Vokalensemble under Bengt Ollén as Sweden's representative in Let the Peoples Sing (LTPS), an international choir competition organized by the European Broadcasting Union (EBU).

Ollén works as choral conductor and teacher in choral singing at Stockholms Musikgymnasium, a highly competitive High School program combining Natural and Social Science programs with advanced choral courses. Stockholms Musikgymnasium accepts students based on a combination of grade point average, singing auditions and tests in music theory. In the 14th International Choir Competition in Budapest, Hungary in 2013 a Stockholms Musikgymnasium class choir directed by Ollén participated in three categories (Mixed choirs, Male choirs and Female choirs) and won gold in all, plus the Grand Prix for the entire competition. In 2016 Ollén once again brought a Stockholms Musikgymnasium class choir to an international competition, this time to the 10th International Choir Competition in Zadar, Croatia, where the choir won the same categories plus the Grand Prix.

Ollén is frequently invited as guest lecturer and choir conductor at universities, choir festivals and concerts in Sweden and abroad, and as judge at international choral competitions.

Ollén arranged the Sweden folk song Trilo in 2017 and his arrangement has been described as "highly atmospheric music".

== Personal life ==
Ollén lives in Stockholm but spends much of his time in Dala-Floda where he owns an old cottage and sometimes helps to arrange concerts. He is married and has an adult daughter.
