= Kammerchor Carmina Mundi =

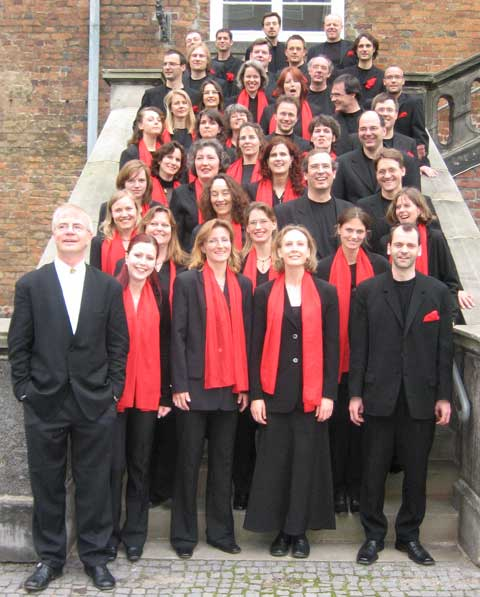
Carmina Mundi, 2006, Kiel

Kammerchor Carmina Mundi is a professional chamber choir based in Aachen, Germany. The choir was founded in 1983 by Harald Nickoll who remains its director to this day. The ensemble's repertoire covers sacred and secular choral works from a wide range of time periods and cultures, but mainly within the a cappella literature. The ensemble has won several national and international competitions including the Bundeschorwettbewerb (German federal competition) in 2006. The choir has toured throughout Europe and in South America and has made a number of commercial recordings.

== Discography ==
- 1990 – J.S.Bach - Matthäus-Passion
- 1991 – Hugo Distler - Mörike-Chorliederbuch Vol. 1
- 1993 – Hugo Distler - Mörike-Chorliederbuch Vol. 2
- 1995 – Chormusik im 20. Jahrhundert
- 1997 – Hugo Distler - Neues Chorliederbuch
- 1998 – G.F.Händel - Dixit Dominus
- 1999 – Europäische Chormusik
- 2001 – ex oriente lux
- 2004 – a cappella extra
- 2009 – Favourite Choir Songs No. 1

== Sources ==
- Biography of Kammerchor Carmina Mundi at bach-cantatas.com
