= Kamēr... =

Latvian choir

- Choir
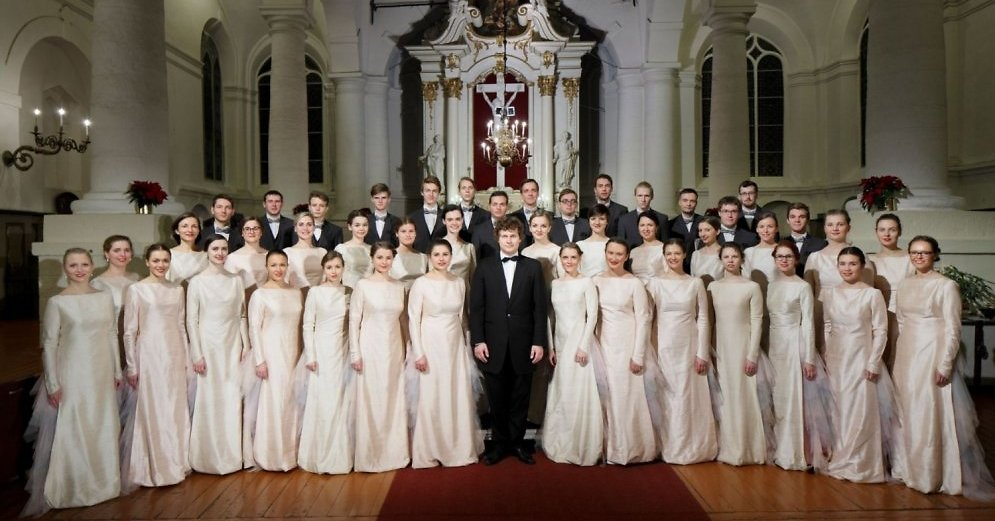
- Kamēr... in December of 2015
- Origin: Riga, Latvia
- Founded: 1990 (36 years ago)
- Founder: Māris Sirmais
- Genre: Classical
- Choirmaster: Patriks Kārlis Stepe
- Chief conductor: Jurģis Cābulis
- Manager: Andrejs Stupins-Jēgers
- Headquarters: Riga State Gymnasium No.1, Riga, Latvia
- Website: kamer.lv

Kamēr... is a Latvian mixed youth choir based in Riga, Latvia, founded in 1990 by Māris Sirmais. A winner of multiple national and international prizes and awards, including the European Grand Prix for Choral Singing in 2004, 2013, 2019 and 2025, the choir performs in various events both in Latvia and worldwide, and collaborates with renowned musicians and orchestras.

== Staff ==
Since June 2022, the artistic director and chief conductor of the choir is Jurģis Cābulis. The former artistic directors of the choir are its founder Māris Sirmais (1990-2012), Jānis Liepiņš (2012-2018) and Aivis Greters (2018-2022).

The choir's managing director is Andrejs Stupins-Jēgers, and corporate relations manager is Andris Vecrumba.

The choir has two vocal coaches: Ansis Sauka un Jolanta Strikaite-Lapiņa. Ansis Sauka works mostly with the male voices, and Jolanta Strikaite-Lapiņa with the female voices. Jolanta became a vocal coach in 2016, after the retirement of Aina Bajāre, who had been working with the choir since its founding in 1990.

The second conductor of "Kamēr..." is Patriks Kārlis Stepe. Former second conductors are Ainārs Rubiķis, Mārtiņš Ozoliņš and Inita Kamarūte.

== Achievements ==
Since its inception in 1990, "Kamēr..." has won numerous multiple national and international choir competitions, prizes and awards:

- 1st prize at the International Chamber Choir Competition Marktoberdorf in Germany (1999);
- Winner of the International Harald Andersén Chamber Choir Competition in Finland (2016);
- 4-time winner of the European Grand Prix for Choral Singing in Goricia (2004), Arezzo (2013 & 2019) and Tolosa (2025);
- 3 championship prizes and gold medals at the World Choir Games in Xiamen, China (2006);
- 7-time consecutive and current winner of Latvian Song festival "Choir wars" (1993, 1998, 2003, 2008, 2013, 2018 and 2023).

"Kamēr..." has also been awarded the Latvian Grand Music Award twice:

- 1999: for high achievements in three choir competitions in Germany and Austria and for successful promotion of Latvian music and performing arts abroad;
- 2005: for the idea and performance of the project "Latvija – Saules zeme" (Latvia - Land of the Sun).

== Notable projects ==
In recent years, Kamēr… has developed programs specially commissioned for the choir. Its biggest project to date is World Sun Songs (2008), which featured 17 new choral works inspired by the sun; the project included such world-renowned composers as Sir John Tavener, Giya Kancheli, Sven-David Sandström, Leonid Desyatnikov, John Luther Adams, Stephen Leek, Dobrinka Tabakova, Ko Matsushita, and others. Other examples of this concept have included the cycles Madrigals of Love (2010), Moon Songs (2012), and Amber Songs (2014), in which several celebrated composers wrote choral miniatures on love, the moon, or arrangements of Latvian folk songs, respectively.

The choir has also actively worked toward the goal of synthesizing genres and means of expression. Examples of this effort have included scenic and choreographed performances of Jersikas derība (an oratorio by Līga Celma), The Christmas Legend (a musical tale by Ēriks Ešenvalds), and The Canticles of the Holy Wind (a large-scale scenic meditation by John Luther Adams). The choir’s diversity was on full display in its 25-year anniversary concert in May 2015 at the Latvian National Opera. In three commissioned song cycles, the choir showed its skill as a nuanced a cappella ensemble (Ešenvalds’ In Bird’s Sleep), as a powerful stage group (Raimonds Tiguls' Legend About Us), and as a splendid collaborator with a professional orchestra (Gabriel Jackson’s Spring Rounds).

Other stage partners of Kamēr... have included Gidon Kremer, Marta Sudraba, the orchestra Kremerata Baltica, Nicolas Altstaedt, Peter Schreier, Yuri Bashmet, Julius Berger, Maxim Rysanov, and many more.

Almost all of the choir's original music as well as various choral classics in the choir's repertoire have been recorded in a series of highly praised CDs. The latest of these are O Salutaris, a collection of choral music by Ēriks Ešenvalds, Moon Songs, a cycle of new works by Latvian composers, and Amber Songs, 17 arrangements of Latvian folk songs by international composers. The latter collection have been published in a sheet music book by Musica Baltica.

== Artistic principles ==
Over the last twenty-five years, Kamēr... has achieved its sound by cultivating its own signature performance style. Both full emotional surrender, a characteristic of amateur singers, as well as the strictest criteria for vocal quality, are of equal importance for the choir. This is expressed in the ellipsis encoded in the choir's name, Kamēr..., which means "while" in English. This entails the motto: "While we are still young, anything is possible."

Many of the choir's singers are highly skilled and experienced, a significant share of them also music students. This generally high level of vocal and musical skill helps maintain internal competition among the voice groups, which in turn ensures a high musical quality overall. Despite the perfectionism and attention to detail that sometimes goes even beyond professional standards, the choir is essentially amateur, its singers having other full-time occupations. Thus, musical education or previous choir experience is not a prerequisite for singing in Kamēr...

The choir begins a new season every September, when it holds auditions for new singers. These candidates are evaluated with regard to their vocal and pitch abilities. A high level of skill and experience is not obligatory, as the choir's vocal coaches later help develop the new singers' skills, as long as they exhibit enough talent, ability and commitment.

The aforementioned core values of the choir - emotional surrender and vocal quality - are both tested before every major concert programme, in individual singing examinations called Atdziedāšana. There, the choir members are asked to perform all the pieces individually, and the choir conductors and vocal coaches then make a decision about the lineup for the concert, based on the singers' performance in this examination.

== Discography ==
- "KAMĒR..." (1998)
- "Baltie ziemassvētki" (1998)
- "Cilvēka seja" (1999)
- "Puškina vainags" (2001)
- "Britens, Taveners, Vasks" (2003)
- "Melanholiskais valsis" (2005)
- "Latviešu kora mūzika" (2005)
- "Styx" (2006)
- "Bach, Kamēr, Pauls" (2007)
- "Veltījumi" (2007)
- "Ērģeles naktī" (2007)
- "Pasaules saules dziesmas" (2008)
- "Mīlas madrigāli" (2010)
- "O Salutaris" (2011)
- "Canticle of the Sun" (2012)
- "Mēness dziesmas" (2012)
- "Kā eleganta cūku pupa ir mana tauta" (2013)
- "Amber songs" (2014)
- "Pelēcis. Plakidis. Kamēr..." (2017)
- "Kalpotājs. Blumbergs. Kamēr..." (2019)
- "Northern Echoes" (2023, Prima Classic)
- "Silent Starlight" (2024, Prima Classic)
- "Kamēr... 35" (2025)
