= Simon Phipps =

Simon Phipps may refer to:

- Simon Phipps (bishop) (1921–2001), Bishop of Lincoln (1974–1987)
- Simon Phipps (game designer) (born 1966), British game designer
- Simon Phipps (programmer), open source advocate
- Simon Phipps, conductor of the Swedish Chamber Choir
- Simon Phipps, lead singer of the band The Engineers
