= Christophorus-Kantorei Altensteig =

- Choir
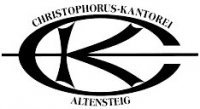
- Origin: Altensteig, Germany
- Founded: 1962 (63 years ago)
- Founder: Jürg Wieber
- Genre: Choral, classical
- Members: 60 (SATB)
- Choirmaster: Michael Nonnenmann
- Website: www.christophorus-kantorei.de

The Christophorus-Kantorei Altensteig is the concert choir of the Christophorus Music Gymnasium Altensteig (Germany). It is composed of girls and boys between the ages of 15 and 19 years. The Choir is conducted by Michael Nonnenmann since 1993 and was founded in 1962 by KMD Dr. Jürg Wieber. Every member of choir takes voice lessons from voice trainers Eberhard Schuler-Meybier and Jeanette Bühler.

== Repertoire ==
The choir has an extensive repertoire of sacred and secular a cappella music with focus on contemporary works like "Short People" by Randy Newman, but also pieces and oratorios by Bach, Handel, Mendelssohn, Schumann, Gounod and Bruch.

== Concerts ==
The Christophorus-Kantorei Altensteig gives 30 to 40 concerts a year in Germany and on an annually concert tour that led to New Zealand, Norway, Denmark, Greece, the Czech Republic, Romania, Hungary, the US, Belgium and France in the past few years.

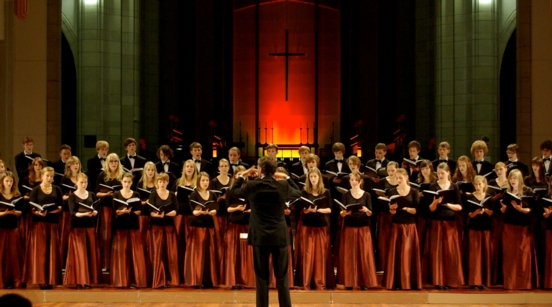
Concert in Auckland (NZ), 2011

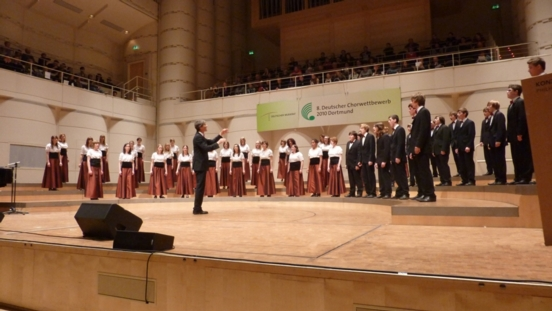
German Choir Competition, Dortmund 2010

== Awards ==
- 1997, 2001, 2005, 2009: 1st Prize at Landeschorwettbewerb Baden-Württemberg
- 2000: 1st Prize cum laude at European Music Festival for the Youth in Neerpelt/ Belgium
- 2002, 2006: 3rd Prize at "German Choir Competition" in Osnabrück/ Kiel
- 2005: 1st Prize at Festival Internacional de Música de Cantonigròs in Spain
- 2008: 3rd at International Musical Eisteddfod in Llangollen/ Wales
- 2009: 2nd Prize and Award of the Audience at International Chamber Choir Competition Marktoberdorf
- 2010: 1st Prize at "German Choir Competition" in Dortmund

== Discography (selection) ==
The choir produced more than 20 CDs, the most recent publications are:

- 1996 - Internationale Chormusik
- 1998 - Jauchzet dem Herren
- 2001 - Jesus Christ Superstar
- 2002 - Cantate Domino
- 2007 - Geistliche und weltliche Chormusik
- 2012 - O du Fröhliche
- 2012 - Laudate omnes gentes
- 2012 - Insalata Vocale
