= Uģis Prauliņš =

Latvian composer

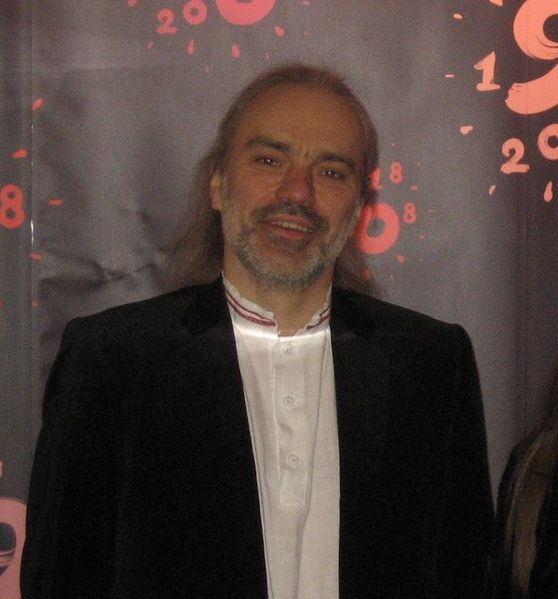
- Uģis Prauliņš, 2008

Background information
- Born: 17 June 1957 (age 69); Riga, Latvian SSR (now Latvia)
- Genres: Classical music, progressive rock, folk music
- Occupations: Composer, musician
- Instruments: Keyboards, organ, piano, vocals

Uģis Prauliņš (Latvian: ['uɟis 'prauliɲʃ]; born 17 June 1957) is a Latvian composer whose choral work Missa Rigensis (Riga Mass) was recorded by the Choir of Trinity College, Cambridge, the Riga Cathedral Boys Choir, Youth Choir BALSIS and has been performed in several locations around the world, amongst those Canada, France, England.

== Background ==
Uģis Prauliņš was born in Riga and studied at the Emīls Dārziņš Music School from 1963 to 1974. Later, he studied conducting and pedagogy at the Latvian Academy of Music from 1977 to 1982, where he also studied composition with Jānis Ivanovs in 1982–83 and Ģederts Ramans from 1984 to 1989 and piano with Valda Kalnina from 1977 to 1982 and 1984–89.

As a keyboardist, he was active as a rock musician in the progressive rock group Salve in the 1970s and in the folk-/progressive-rock group Vecās mājas in the 1980s.

== Selected works ==
His album Pagānu gadagrāmata (Pagan Yearbook), was recorded with the band Iļģi with guest appearances by Latvian folk musicians in 1998. It contains a seasonal cycle of mostly traditional songs and instrumental pieces with an emphasis on the natural progression of the year.

Missa Rigensis (2002) was written for and first recorded by the Riga Cathedral Boys Choir, conducted by Mārtiņš Klišāns. In 2008 conductor Stephen Layton recorded Missa Rigensis with the Choir of Trinity College of Cambridge. The recordings were released on CD titled "Baltic Exchange" on the Hyperion Records label. Prauliņš stated that his desire in composing the piece was "to retain attention by the singers' voices alone."

His Christmas composition, "Latvian Solstice in the New World", was described as a song that would "disturb the solitude so people can feel real joy" in a review by Minnesota Public Radio.

The recording by Stephen Layton, Michala Petri, and the Danish National Vocal Ensemble of Prauliņš' 2010 composition "The Nightingale" (based on the eponymous fairytale by Hans Christian Andersen) was nominated for a 2013 Grammy award in two categories – "Best Contemporary Composition" and "Best Choral Performance."

The Rock oratorium ODI et AMO 2.0 (2018) with boys' choir Uetersen and Anna-Maria Hefele.
