= Sacred and Profane =

Sacred and Profane may refer to:

- Sacred–profane dichotomy, the contrast between sacred and profane, a central characteristic of religion
- Sacred and Profane (Britten), a 1975 collection of choral compositions by Benjamin Britten
- Sacred and Profane (novel), a 1987 novel by Faye Kellerman
- Live: Sacred and Profane, a 2000 live album by Berlin
- Songs Sacred and Profane, a 1929 song cycle by John Ireland
- Sacred and Profane, a 2004 studio album Swedish Chamber Choir
- The Sacred and the Profane: The Nature of Religion, a 1957 book by Mircea Eliade

== See also ==
- Sacred and Profane Love (film), a 1921 American silent drama film
- Sacred and Profane Love, a 1514 painting by Titian
- The Sacred and Profane Love Machine, a 1974 novel by Iris Murdoch
