= Trilo =

Swedish folk song

Trilo is a traditional Swedish folk song. The song is about longing for someone at sea, traditionally sung by Swedish and Norwegian wives as their husbands returned from sea.

Trilo has been arranged for choir several times. An arrangement by Ale Möller has been included in his album Nordan (1994) with Lena Willemark, and has been released later for choir a cappella.

An arrangement by Bengt Ollén written in 2017 has been recorded by Sofia Vokalensemble. The piece was included on the album Song of the North released in March 2018 and has been described as "highly atmospheric music". Ollén's arrangement of Trilo was performed by the Oxford Intermezzo chamber choir as the opening number with the choir distributed around the audience in a "Songs of the North" concert at SJE Arts Oxford on 7 September 2019.

In 2021, the folk song Trilo was used as the basis of a choral setting by Simon Jackson of Thomas Campion's poem Never weather-beaten sail.
