= Hyökki =

Hyökki is a Finnish surname. Notable people with the surname include:

- Matti Hyökki (born 1946), conductor of the YL Male Voice Choir
- Pasi Hyökki (born 1970), son of Matti, conductor of the Tapiola Choir
