= University of the Philippines Madrigal Singers =

Major choral group

The Philippine Madrigal Singers
- Choir
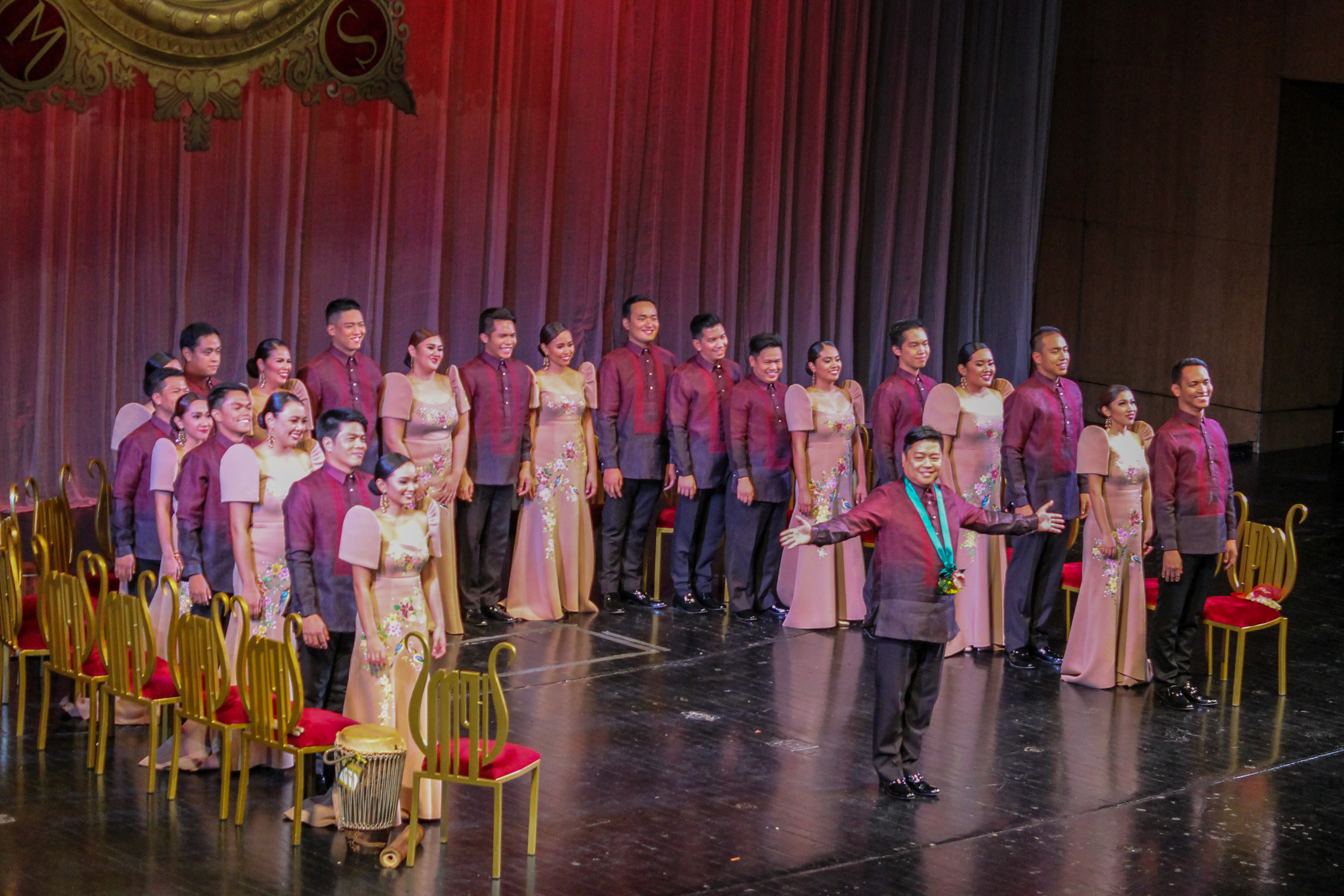
- The Philippine Madrigal Singers acknowledges the audience at the end of their homecoming concert "Trionfo" (8 October 2016) at the Main Theater (Tanghalang Nicanor Abelardo of the Cultural Center of the Philippines. Standing at the center is choirmaster Mark Anthony Carpio.
- Also known as: Madz
- Origin: Quezon City, Philippines
- Founded: 1963
- Founder: Andrea Veneracion
- Genre: Choral music
- Choirmaster: Mark Anthony Carpio (since 2001)
- Headquarters: Cultural Center of the Philippines
- Awards: Grand Prize of the European Grand Prix for Choral Singing (1997 and 2007); UNESCO Artist for Peace (2009)
- Website: Official website

The University of the Philippines Madrigal Singers (UPMS), also known as the Philippine Madrigal Singers or simply Madz, is one of the major choral groups based in the University of the Philippines, Diliman. Its current conductor, musical director, and choirmaster is Mark Anthony A. Carpio. The Madz is the first choir to win the European Grand Prix for Choral Singing (EGP) twice (in 1997 and in 2007).

== History ==
The Philippine Madrigal Singers, also known as the "Madz", was founded in 1963 by National Artist for Music, Professor Andrea O. Veneracion. Most of the members are associated with the University of the Philippines.

The ensemble performs a wide repertoire of various styles and forms: renaissance music, classical music, Filipino and international folksongs, contemporary and avant-garde music, opera, and even popular music. Their specialization and focus on the Madrigal, a polyphonic and challenging musical style popular during the Renaissance period where singers and guests would gather around the table during a banquet to sight-sing and make music together. This served as the inspiration for their unique style of singing – singing seated in a semicircle without a conductor.

As a Philippine ambassador of culture and goodwill, the Madz has given command performances for royalty and heads of state. These include Pope Paul VI, Pope John Paul II, Pope Francis, United States Presidents Gerald Ford, Richard Nixon, Barack Obama, Queen Sofía of Spain, King Juan Carlos I of Spain, Singapore Prime Minister Lee Kuan Yew and Chinese President Hu Jintao.

As resident artists of the Cultural Center of the Philippines, the group has performed in outreach concerts in far-flung areas seldom reached by most performing artists.

The group is presently under the leadership of Madz alumnus Mark Anthony A. Carpio.

== Awards ==
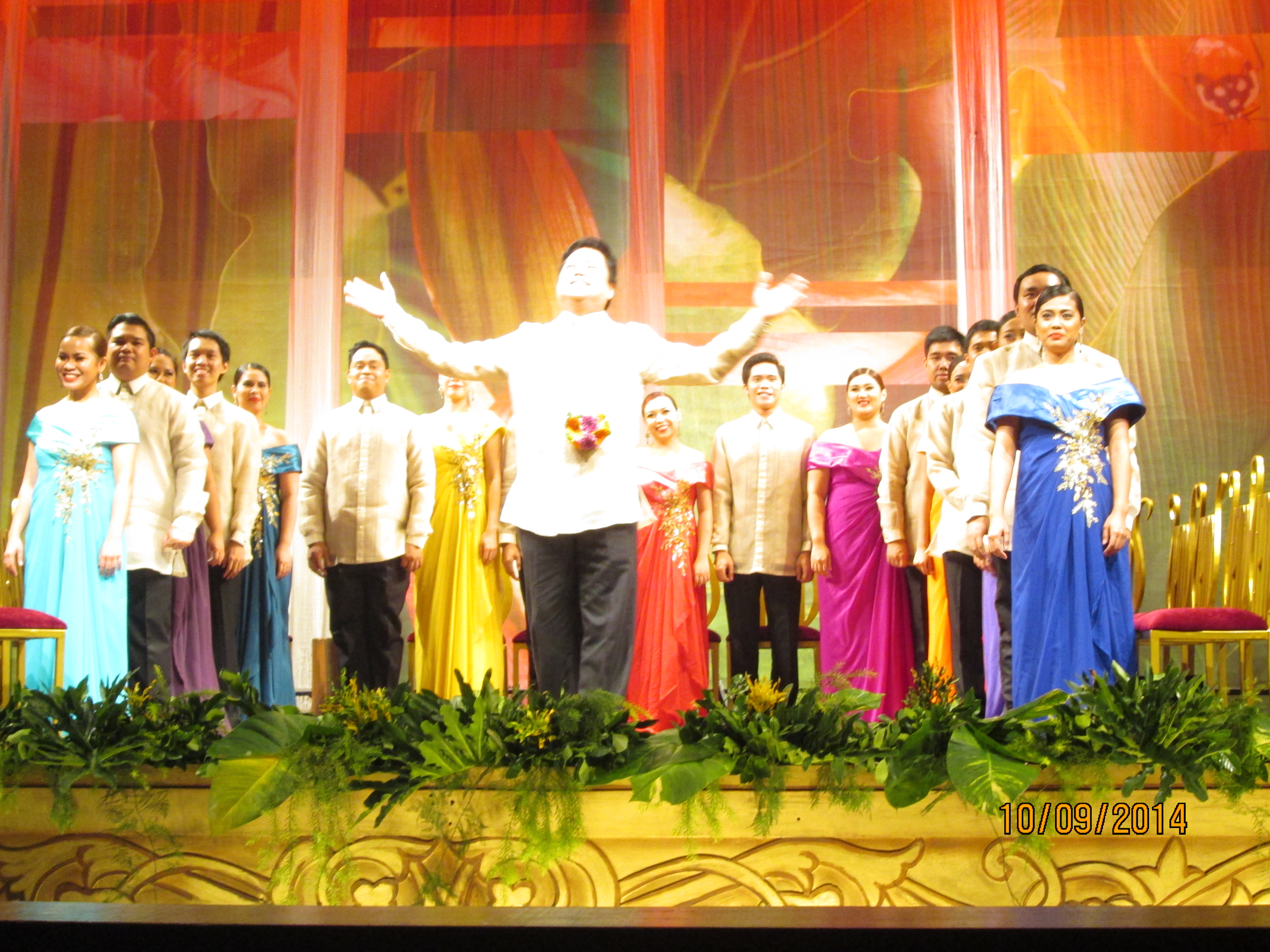
The Philippine Madrigal Singers during their PANORAMA Concert held at Abelardo Hall, UP Diliman, 9 October 2014

In June 1997, under the baton of Professor Andrea O. Veneracion, the Philippine Madrigal Singers came home from their ninth world concert tour, winning the grand prize in the European Grand Prix for Choral Singing (in French, Grand Prix Européen de Chant Choral, commonly abbreviated as European Choral Grand Prix or EGP) in Tours, France, besting five other grand prize winners of the most prestigious choral competitions in Europe: Guido d'Arezzo, Italy; Debrecen, Hungary; Varna, Bulgaria; Gorizia, Italy; and Tolosa, Spain. The Madz displayed a virtuoso performance so moving one juror had to describe the group's music as the "most beautiful sound on earth".

On 26 August 2007, under the baton of Mark Anthony A. Carpio, the Philippine Madrigal Singers won, for the second time, the grand prize in the European Grand Prix for Choral Singing in Arezzo, Italy. This victory makes them the first of the only four choirs in the world to win the grand prize twice.

On 27 July 2009, UNESCO honored the Madz and designated the group as UNESCO Artist for Peace. This title is given to celebrity advocates charged with the mission of embodying and raising awareness of the UNESCO ideals, which include peace, security, fundamental human rights, and freedom.

On 19 September 2010, the Philippine Madrigal Singers was conferred the Guidoneum Award 2010 by the Fondazione Guido d’Arezzo in Italy. Foundation President Francesco Lusi said, during the awarding, that the foundation "followed attentively and with great pleasure the fruitful activities of the Madrigal Singers and are grateful for all that the Philippine Madrigal Singers have done for the choral world". He further stressed that "the foundation honored the Madrigal Singers "for the artistic and choral promotion activity that they carried out after they won the European Grand Prix for Choral Singing in 2007".

On 27 August 2016, the Philippine Madrigal Singers won the Grand Prix at the 64th International Choral Competition in Arezzo, Italy. Their win qualified them for the European Grand Prix held in Tolosa, Spain in 2017.

== Recent milestones ==
- 3 August 2011: The Philippine Madrigal Singers debuted at the Teatro Colón in Buenos Aires. They are the first Filipino choir to sing in Argentina.
- 1 July 2012: The Philippine Madrigal Singers won the Brand Laureate Premier Award (as World's Best Choral Ensemble) from the Asia Pacific Brands Foundation.
- 7 September 2013: The Madrigal Singers held a joint concert with the Swingle Singers, a 5-time Grammy Award winning vocal group, at the Cultural Center of the Philippines.
- January 2015: The Madrigal Singers led thousands of singers in the celebrations during the Pastoral and State Visit of Pope Francis.
- 9 May 2015: The Madrigal Singers held a joint concert with the King's Singers at the Cultural Center of the Philippines.

== Performances ==
Throughout its history, the Philippine Madrigal Singers has given life to a myriad of choral compositions and arrangements by the renaissance, baroque, classical, romantic, and contemporary composers, and has performed works of some of the world's top composers and arrangers. The group has also sung compositions and arrangements by Filipino composers, including those by active members and alumni of the Madz, including Robert Delgado, Anna Abeleda-Piquero, Nilo Alcala, Saunder Choi, Ily Matthew Maniano, and Ed Nepomuceno.

For the 2007 European Grand Prix for Choral Singing held in Arezzo, Italy, the choral group performed a 20-minute program that included John August Pamintuan's celestial arrangement of "Pater Noster", the French madrigal "Revecy venir du printans" ("Revoicy venir du printemps") composed by Claude Le Jeune, the German art song "Jagdlied" by Felix Mendelssohn, the American contemporary song "We Beheld Once Again the Stars" ("Riveder le Stelle") by Z. Randall Stroope, and a children's song from Maguindanao, Philippines titled "Kaisa-isa Niyan" by Madz alumnus Nilo Alcala.

== Discography ==
- Joy: A Choral Celebration of Christmas (1997)
- Bayan Ko, Aawitan Kita (1998)
- Madz in Love (1999)
- Madz Around the World (2000)
- Acclamation (2006)
- Love, Joy and Inspiration (2006) – a special edition compilation containing the CDs Joy, Madz in Love and Acclamation
- Maior Caritas Op. 5 (2008)
- Madz in Love Continues... (2009)
- Madz Goes Jesuit (Songs from the Concert) (2015)
- Halo-Halo: Mga Awiting Bayan (2015)
- Onomatopoeia: The Choral Works of Nilo Alcala (2017)
- Salampati: Choral Arrangements of Philippine Folk Songs from the Bicol Region (2017)
- Maria (Rev. Fr. Carlo Magno Marcelo) (2018)
- Euphonos: The Choral Works of Ily Matthew Maniano (2018)
- FLOW: Faith Lives on Wondrously (2022)
- ALPAS: Awit at Letra ng mga Pambansang Alagad ng Sining (2022)
- Diwang Paskuhan (2022)

== Choirmasters ==
- Founding Choirmaster: National Artist for Music Professor Andrea O. Veneracion (1963–2001, retired, deceased)
- Current Choirmaster: Mark Anthony A. Carpio (2001–present)
