= Hans Michael Beuerle =

Hans Michael Beuerle (15 June 1941 – 15 January 2015) was a German choir- and orchestra director.

== Life ==
Born in Berlin, Beuerle was the son of the church musician Herbert Beuerle and Lotte Beuerle, née Engelmann. In his parental home he received his musical imprint through vocal and instrumental ensemble music, especially from the time of the Baroque. While still a student at a high school in Frankfurt, he studied violin and chamber music at the Hoch Conservatory followed by school music at the Frankfurt University of Music and Performing Arts, then violin and postgraduate conducting studies (artistic maturity examination), as well as musicology, German studies and philosophy at the Goethe University Frankfurt. In 1975 he was awarded a doctorate in musicology by Ludwig Finscher with a thesis on the a cappella compositions of Johannes Brahms.

While still a student, he took over a student choir at the Goethe University in Frankfurt in 1966, from which the Kammerchor Frankfurt emerged. In 1984 the ensemble was awarded a prize at the international choir competition Let the Peoples Sing. From 1971 to 1972 he was artistic director of the boys choir of the Laubacher Kantorei. In 1973 he accepted a teaching position in choral conducting at the Staatliche Hochschule für Musik Trossingen. In 1977 he changed to a professorship at the Hochschule für Musik Karlsruhe. From 1980 until his retirement in 2006 he was professor for choir and orchestra conducting at the Hochschule für Musik Freiburg.

From 1983 until his death he was also artistic director of the Freiburg Bach Choir and the Freiburg Bach Orchestra.

In 1991 the Kammerchor Frankfurt changed seat and name and developed under Beuerle's direction as Anton-Webern-Chor Freiburg to a professional vocal ensemble.

In addition, Beuerle initiated CHŒUR3 e. V. with colleagues from Alsace and Switzerland - International Choir Academy in the triangle of those three countries.

Beuerle died in Freiburg im Breisgau in January 2015 at the age of 73 of a severe pneumonia, which he had contracted after his last public appearance.

== Awards ==
- 2011: Order of Merit of the Federal Republic of Germany.

== Bibliography ==
- Walter Habel: Wer ist wer?, volume 29. Schmidt-Römhild, 1990.
