= Swedish Chamber Choir =

1997 Swedish choir in Gothenburg, Sweden

The Swedish Chamber Choir (earlier known as Simon Phipps Vocal Ensemble) is a Swedish mixed choir based in Gothenburg. The choir was formed in 1997 and has been led by British conductor Simon Phipps since the beginning. In recent years the choir has received a lot of attention winning several international competitions.

The choir received the Swedish award Choir of the year 2006. In 2011 the Swedish Chamber Choir won both the EBU Silver Rose Bowl and the European Grand Prix for Choral Singing.

== Recordings ==
Footprint Records has released 3 recordings of the choir under the theme Sacred and Profane. The choir has also released a self-produced Christmas CD and a recording of Swedish music from 1950 and onwards.

- Sacred and Profane, Choral music by Benjamin Britten. Released in 2004.
- Sacré et Profane, Choral music by Francis Poulenc. Released in 2005.
- och när snön faller vit, Christmas music. Released in 2006.
- Geistlich und Weltlich, Choral music by Johannes Brahms. Released in 2007.
- New Favourites, modern Swedish choir music. Released in 2011.
- Shakespeare Songs and Sonnets, Released in 2014.
- So Fair and Bright, Released in 2016.
- Like to the Lark, Released in 2019.

== Placement in major international choral competitions ==
- 2011 1st place - European Grand Prix for Choral Singing in Tolosa, Spain
- 2011 1st place and winner of the Silver Rose Bowl - Let the Peoples Sing, European Broadcasting Union (EBU)
- 2010 1st place - Choir; 1st place - Historic period, Romantic program; 1st place - Historic period, Modern program; Gran Premio Città di Arezzo
- 2007 1st place - Mixed vocal ensemble; 1st place - Free programme; Prix du Public and Grand Prix de la Ville de Tours, Tours, France
- 2005 1st place - Mixed choir, International Chamber Choir Competition Marktoberdorf, Germany
- 2004 1st place - Mixed choir with compulsory piece, 2nd place - Musica sacra, Helsingborg, Sweden
- 2003 2nd place - Mixed voices folklore, Tolosa, Spain
