= Jānis Liepiņš (conductor) =

Latvian conductor

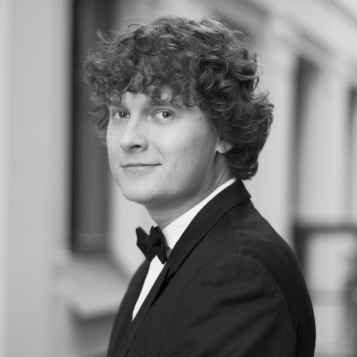

Background information
- Born: August 7, 1988 (age 37); Riga, Latvia
- Genres: Classical
- Occupation: Conductor
- Website: janisliepins.com

Jānis Liepiņš (born August 7, 1988, in Riga, Latvia) is a Latvian conductor.

== Career ==
Since 2014 he has been the conductor at the Latvian National Opera and Ballet (LNO). For the LNO, he has conducted productions of Il trovatore (2014), Le Villi and Gianni Schicchi (2015), Eugene Onegin (2016), Romeo and Juliet (2014), Scheherazade And Her Tales (2016), and La Bayadère (2012), and was both the conductor and musical director for the ballet Raymonda (2015) and operetta Die Fledermaus (2015).

He has been the artistic director and chief conductor of the youth choir Kamēr... since 2012, which he joined as assistant conductor in 2006. With the leadership of Liepiņš, Kamēr... was named the champion of two categories and won the Grand Prix of the Béla Bartók International Choir Competition in 2012 in Debrecen, Hungary. This victory led to an invitation to compete in the European Grand Prix for Choral Singing of 2013 in Arezzo, Italy, where the choir won its second European Grand Prix.

Liepiņš studied at the Department of Conducting of the Riga Dome Choir School and earned two bachelor's degrees in choral and symphonic conducting at Jāzeps Vītols Latvian Academy of Music. He has also obtained skills in masterclasses by Colin Metters and during his exchange studies in Berlin under Lutz Köhler.

In recognition of Kamēr... winning the 2013 European Grand Prix, as well as his successful debuts with the Latvian National Symphony Orchestra, the Liepāja Symphony Orchestra, and the Sinfonietta Rīga, Liepiņš was awarded the Latvian Grand Music Award as the New Artist in 2013, and Diena's Annual Culture Award in 2013.
