= Agnes Duncan =

Scottish singer and conductor

- Born: 10 November 1899; Alexandria, West Dunbartonshire, Scotland
- Died: 23 March 1997 (aged 97)

Agnes Duncan MBE (10 November 1899 – 23 March 1997) was a Scottish singer and choral conductor. Her Scottish Junior Singers won the leading BBC choral competition on two occasions.

== Life ==
Duncan was born in Alexandria in West Dunbartonshire. and she was singing in Vale of Leven children’s choir, with her elder sister, when she was ten.

She became the contralto soloist of Glasgow Cathedral Choir. She first attended the first Glasgow Music Festival in 1911.

She formed the Scottish Junior Singers in 1943. It was launched on credit and it had 60 singers.

In 1952 she conducted at the Edinburgh International Festival.

In 1958 Duncan's choir had won the children's and the youth class of the BBC radio's Let the People Sing choral competition. which were held in the Royal Festival Hall. In 1961 Agnes Duncan's choir again won the children's and the youth class.

In 1967 Duncan was rewarded with an MBE in recognition of her contribution to music.

Duncan died in 1997 having attended every Glasgow Music Festival since 1911. She was frequently a conductor or performer, but she was later a committee member. She was in time made the honorary life President.

== Death and legacy ==
In 1989 the Agnes Duncan Trophy was created by the Soroptimist International's Glasgow Club to mark Agnes Duncan’s 90th Birthday. The Trophy, and a cheque for £100 is awarded to the best soloist, under 18, at the Glasgow Music Festival.
