= Tapiola Choir =

Finnish child and youth choir

Tapiola Choir Tapiolan kuoro, Tapiolakören
- Origin: Espoo, Finland
- Genres: Children's choir
- Years active: 1963–present
- Spinoffs: Tapiola Chamber Choir

The Tapiola Choir (Finnish: Tapiolan kuoro, Swedish: Tapiolakören, originally Tapiolan Yhteiskoulun kuoro) is a children's choir from Espoo, Finland. The choir was founded in 1963 by Erkki Pohjola. Pohjola led the choir from its formation until 1994 and cultivated a pedagogical style based on the teachings of Zoltan Kodály and Carl Orff. During Pohjola's tenure as artistic director the choir undertook some fifty tours of the USA, Japan and the USSR among other countries. In 1994 the director's post was taken over by Kari Ala-Pöllänen and in 2008 by Pasi Hyökki.

The choir has enjoyed international acclaim and has become associated with the concept of the "Tapiola Sound" which critics have used to describe its uniquely clear and natural sound. In 1971 the Tapiola Choir won the BBC Let the People Sing contest with a programme that included the piece Aglepta by Arne Mellnäs which was considered too difficult to perform by some Scandinavian choirs. The choir was awarded the UNESCO Prize for the Promotion of the Arts in 1996 and the Youth Choir of the Year award by the Finnish Broadcasting Company in 2005. In 2017 the Ministry of Education and Culture of Finland awarded the Tapiola Choir with the Lapsenpäivä prize for excellence in art education.

In 1984 former members of the choir founded the Tapiola Chamber Choir. In 2020 the choir established the Kari Ala-Pöllänen prize to be awarded biennially to accomplished and inspiring Finnish school choir directors.

== See also ==
- Tapiola Sinfonietta
