= Andrea Veneracion =

- Born: Andrea Ofilada Veneracion; July 11, 1928; Manila, Philippine Islands
- Died: July 9, 2013 (aged 84); Quezon City, Philippines
- Awards: Order of National Artists of the Philippines
- Musical career
- Also known as: Ma'am OA
- Genres: Choral music, classical music, folk music, pop music
- Occupations: Conductor, composer, arranger, singer
- Instrument: Vocals
- Years active: 1963–2004
- Formerly of: Philippine Madrigal Singers

Andrea Ofilada Veneracion (or Ma'am OA; July 11, 1928 – July 9, 2013) was a Filipino choral conductor and a recipient of the 1999 National Artist for Music award. She founded the Philippine Madrigal Singers in 1963. She was also an adjudicator in numerous international choral competitions and was an active force in choral music before her massive stroke in 2005.

== Early life ==
She was born on July 11, 1928, to Macario Ofilada and Raymunda Carriaga. She was raised in Manila, Philippines.

She earned her Bachelor of Music degrees in Piano and Voice at the University of the Philippines Diliman, graduating cum laude. She was a lyric soprano soloist in various Oratorio works and in the Opera Stage. She was also a very accomplished pianist and accompanist and was the accompanist of National Artist for Music, Jovita Fuentes for a number of years. Apart from being an musician, she was also an athlete as a competitive swimmer. She was part of the Philippine swimming team who first competed internationally in Hong Kong.

== Philippine Madrigal Singers ==
Later on, she continued to pursue her master's degree in Voice at Indiana University School of Music in Bloomington, Indiana, as a Fulbright scholar, where she encountered the Indiana University Madrigal Singers, who rallied the music of the Renaissance period.

Upon her return to the Philippines in 1963, she established a singing group with the same idea. This group was initially exclusive of U.P. faculty members and students and became officially known as the University of the Philippines Madrigal Singers. She established a tradition for which the Madz, as they are fondly called, are known for: unlike most choirs, the Madz were seated in a semicircular formation without a conductor. The choirmaster is at the left-most end of the circle, and leads the group by giving their cues, much like how a concertmaster leads in an orchestra.

Under her direction, the Philippine Madrigal Singers won major awards in international choral competitions, including those in Spittal an der Drau, Austria; Arezzo and Gorizia, Italy; Neuchâtel, Switzerland; Debrecen, Hungary; Varna, Bulgaria; Tolosa, Spain; and Marktoberdorf, Germany. In 1996, she led the Philippine Madrigal Singers to its victory in the 1996 International Choral Competition in Tolosa, Spain. This made them eligible to compete for the European Grand Prix for Choral Singing the following year and eventually won the title in Tours, France.

Veneracion was the founding choirmaster and first conductor of the Asian Institute for Liturgy and Music (AILM) Chorale.

Later, some of her choristers established their own careers as well-known music performers and choral composers, conductors and arrangers in the Philippines; they include Ryan Cayabyab, Joel Navarro, Joy Nilo, Victor Asuncion, Montet Acoymo, Robert Delgado, Edgardo Nepomuceno, Jonathan Velasco, Eudenice Palaruan, Fr. Arnold Zamora, Christopher Borela, Anna Tabita Abeleda-Piquero, Fabian Obispo, Ruben Federizon, Eric Robert Santos and the present Madz Choirmaster, Mark Anthony Carpio.

In 1997, she was given the TOFIL (The Outstanding Filipino) Award for Culture and the Arts For her contributions to the development of choral singing in the Philippines.

In 1999, she was named National Artist for Music, the highest cultural award bestowed by the Philippine government for an individual.

In 2001, she retired as the Choirmaster of the Philippine Madrigal Singers. Together with an artistic committee, she personally selected Mark Anthony Carpio, her Assistant Choirmaster at that time, to be her successor. The Madz turnover ceremonies were held in a special concert at the Cultural Center of the Philippines coinciding with the launch of her biography "A Life Shaped By Music" by Marjorie Evasco.

She continued to guide the Madz under Carpio's baton by joining them in their 2002 North American Tours, 2003 Asian Tours and 2004 European Concert Tours. She was also there to witness Carpio's first international competition as Choirmaster (and the Madz's first competition after 7 years) at the 2004 International Habaneras and Polyphony Contest in Torrevieja, Spain, where the Madz won First places for both categories and was also the last choir to do so.

In December 2005, she suffered a massive stroke which led to her paralysis. The Madz performed benefit concerts, the proceeds of which were used to help the Veneracion family with Ma'am OA's medical expenses.

Having been comatose since her 2005 stroke, Veneracion died on July 9, 2013, at her home in Cubao, Quezon City at the age of 84 and two days before her 85th birthday. She was cremated on July 11, 2013 (her 85th Birthday); her necrological rites at the Cultural Center of the Philippines were held on Sunday, July 14, 2013., followed by her interment at the Libingan ng mga Bayani

== Awards ==
- 1997 – TOFIL (The Outstanding Filipino) award
- 1999 – National Artist of the Philippines for Music – currently the only awardee for choral music.
- 2001 – Distinguished Alumni Service award – awarded by Indiana University.

== See also ==
- Philippine Madrigal Singers
- Mark Anthony Carpio
