= Let the Peoples Sing 2024 =

International song competition

Dates and venue
- Semi-final: 19 January 2024
- Final: 6 October 2024
- Venue: London, United Kingdom

Organisation
- Organiser: European Broadcasting Union (EBU)
- Host broadcaster: British Broadcasting Corporation (BBC)
- Presenters: Ian Skelly; Suzi Digby

Participants
- Number of entries: 8
- Number of finalists: 8

Vote
- Voting system: Jury voting by a panel of eight judges to decide the winning choir
- Winning choir: Denmark; Copenhagen Girls' Choir

Let the Peoples Sing 2024 was the 47th edition of the international choral competition Let the Peoples Sing. It consisted of a semi-final on 19 January and a final on 6 October 2024. It was organised by the European Broadcasting Union (EBU), and host broadcaster British Broadcasting Corporation (BBC). For the first time in the contest, the finalists competed live from their own countries, with the performances assessed by an eight-member jury voting from the BBC in London. This was the first time since 2003 that the city of London hosted the contest, having done so for the inaugural contest in 1961 until 1982, and once again in 2001 and 2003. The final was presented by Ian Skelly and Suzi Digby.

Eight choirs from seven countries participated, with Finland being the only country who competed in both adult's and children/youth's categories. The winner was Copenhagen Girls' Choir from Denmark. The adult category was won by Hägersten A Cappella from Sweden and the inaugural Youth Jury prize was won by Incantanti from Switzerland.

== Location ==
For the first time since the contest's inception, the finalists competed live from their own countries. However, their performances were assessed by an eight-member jury voting from the British Broadcasting Corporation (BBC) in London.

== Format ==
Competing countries who are members of the European Broadcasting Union (EBU) radio organizations were eligible to compete in the contest, who can enter choir groups in two categories, adult and children/youth.

The competition was organized in two rounds: semi-finals and finals. The EBU jury for the semi-finals took place remotely and based their result on audio listening only, while the EBU international jury convened face-to-face at the BBC in London to listen live on air to the eight finalists and decide on the winner.

In the semi-final, each choral group submitted a recording of 10–20 minutes, consisting of at least three contrasting pieces of music, at least two pieces must be sung a cappella. The recording must include pieces of music from at least two different stylistic periods or musical genres/styles and must be performed in one take and cannot be edited.

The final was held in the form of a public concert organised and broadcast live by the EBU radio organizations that entered choirs selected as finalists. Each choral group performed an 8-10 minute programme of music, which were different from that of the semi-finals and which was performed completely acoustically. There were no restrictions as to periods and styles.

The winning choir was presented the Silver Rose Bowl. For the first time in the contest's history, the winning children/youth choir was also awarded the Youth Jury prize by the representatives from the European Choral Association Youth Committee.

== Jury members ==
On 30 June 2024, the EBU announced the jury for the final:

- (United Kingdom) Jonathan Manners – BBC Singers producer (co-chair)
- (Finland) Inari Tilli – Yle journalist (co-chair)
- (United Kingdom) Bob Chilcott – conductor and composer (guest juror)
- (South Africa) Pumeza Matshikiza – soprano (guest juror)
- (Ukraine) Natalia Popudribko – Radio Kultura head of the Art Fund Department of Chief Editorial Office for Music Programmes
- (Spain) Albert Torrens – Catalunya Música programme editor
- (Latvia) Anna Veismane – Latvijas Radio 3 Klasika composer and music producer
- (Germany) Susanne Vongries – Bavarian Radio Choir manageress

== Participating countries ==
The official list of participants was published on 4 February 2024 and included seven countries, with Finland being the only country who competed in both categories. Copenhagen Girls Choir from Denmark won the competition and received the Silver Rose Bowl, with Hägersten A Cappella from Sweden winning the adult category and Incantanti from Switzerland winning the Youth Jury prize. BarbAros, the 2019 winner, performed as an interval act.

Silver Rose Bowl winner
Youth Jury winner
Category winner

Let the Peoples Sing 2024
R/O	Country	Choir	Song(s)	Conductor
Children's/youth category
1	Bulgaria	BNR Children's Choir	"Now Is the Month of Maying" – Thomas Morley; "Northern Lights" – Ola Gjeilo; "Bezmŭlven" – Dimitar Hristov	Hristo Nedyalkov
2	Switzerland	Incantanti	"Celtic Dance" – Kirby Shaw; "Ceremony After a Fire Raid" – Ernst Widmer; "Luagant vu Bärga und Tal" – Traditional; "Las giallinas" – Curò Mani-Vital; "Kruhay" – Benny F. Castillon	Christian Klucker
3	Denmark	Copenhagen Girls Choir	"Jeg og dig" – Matti Borg; "Tota pulchra es, Maria" – Maurice Duruflé; "I himmelen" – Karin Rehnqvist	Anne-Terese Sales
4	Finland	Chorus Iucundus	"Nouse lauluni" – Soila Sariola; "I Shall Pass Through This World" – Margaret Bonds; "Väinämöinen uneksii lentävästä veneestään" – Jaakko Mäntyjärvi	Timo Lehtovaara
Adult category
5	Estonia	Encore	"Unelaul" – Karin Tuul; "Adrift! A Little Boat Adrift!" – Tõnu Kõrvits; "Noore veljo, veeritäge" – Mart Saar	Karin Tuul
6	Finland	KYN	"Toivon että toivon" – Riikka Talvitie; "And I Saw" – Timothy C. Takach; "Kalastusloitsu" – Jukka Linkola	Kaija Viitasalo
7	Latvia	Juventus	"Aeternum" – Jēkabs Jančevskis; "Mēness vokalīze" – Evija Skuke	Valdis Tomsons
8	Sweden	Hägersten A Cappella	"Mässa för dubbelkör" – Frank Martin; "Let Him Kiss Me" – Sven-David Sandström; "Pluck the Fruit and Taste the Pleasure" – Libby Larsen	Kerstin Börjeson

== Broadcasts ==
Broadcasters in participating countries
Country	Broadcaster	Channel(s)	Commentator(s)	Ref(s)
Bulgaria	BNR	Hristo Botev Radio	Unknown	
Denmark	DR	DR P2	Esben Tange	
Estonia	ERR	Klassikaraadio	Marge-Ly Rookäär and Ivo Heinloo	
Finland	Yle	Yle Radio 1	Noora Hirn and Riikka Holopainen	
Latvia	LR	Latvijas Radio P3	Inta Pīrāga	
Sweden	SR	Sveriges Radio P2	Jack Lantz	
Switzerland	RTR	Radio RTR	Flavio Bundi	
Switzerland	SRF	Radio SRF 2 Kultur (Note: Delayed broadcast on 13 October at 15:03 CEST (14:03 UTC))	Patricia Moreno	

Broadcasters in non-participating countries
Country	Broadcaster	Channel(s)	Commentator(s)	Ref(s)
Germany	HR	hr2-kultur	Susanne Herzog	
Germany	WDR	WDR 3	Susanne Herzog	
Iceland	RÚV	Rás 1 (Note: Delayed broadcast on 16 October at 19:00 WET (20:00 UTC))	Ása Briem	
Ireland	RTÉ	RTÉ lyric fm	Unknown	
Norway	NRK	NRK Klassisk	Unknown	
Ukraine	Suspilne	Radio Culture (Note: Delayed broadcast on 16 October)	Unknown	
