= The Resonanz Children's Choir =

Indonesian family of children's choirs

- Choir
- Also known as: TRCC
- Founded: 2007
- Artistic Director: Avip Priatna
- Chief conductor: Luciana Oendoen, David Hartono Chendra, Rainier Revireino
- Headquarters: Jakarta, Indonesia
- Website: theresonanzchildrenschoir.com

The Resonanz Children's Choir is a family of choirs for young singers owned by the Resonanz Music Studio of Indonesia. It is a mixed unit comprises three choir groups for young people aged between four and seventeen, including Serunai, Seruling and Tifa.

== Founding and performance history ==
Founded in 2007 by Avip Priatna, the Resonanz Children's Choir is regarded to teach the right singing techniques for young singers, and indicates the singing talent of Indonesian children and teenagers, which would be further developed. They held the inaugural concert, My Name Is Music, in 2008. In 2012, the choir won the gold medal at the inaugural Bali International Choir Festival.

TRCC regularly gives performances at venues and festivals such as Ismail Marzuki Park, Balai Resital Kertangera/Kertanegara Recital Hall and the Ciputra Artpreneur Theatre, as well as at events of national significance. Local artists that they collaborated in concerts such as Farman Purnama and Andrea Miranda, along with top choirs including Avip Priatna's own Batavia Madrigal Singers, Armonia Choir, the Twilite Chorus and many others.

In 2015, TRCC won the Golden Gate International Choral Festival for the folk song and historical music categories. At the same competition, the choir also came second for the gospel category, and third for the contemporary category.

The choir won the Grand Prix at the Claudio Monteverdi International Choral Festival and Competition held on Venice, Italy, in 2016, for performing Zoltán Kodály's "Tancnota" and the Papuan traditional song "Yamko Rambe Yamko". The choir also won the European Grand Prix for Choral Singing 2018 under the guidance of Avip Priatna, Luciana Oendoen and Devi Fransisca.

In 2026, TRCC won the Grand Prize Award at the Béla Bartók International Choir Competition in Debrecen, Hungary.

== Musical directors and conductors ==
=== Current artistic director ===
- Avip Priatna

=== Former conductor ===
- Devi Fransisca
