= Aarhus Girls' Choir =

Danish choir

- Choir
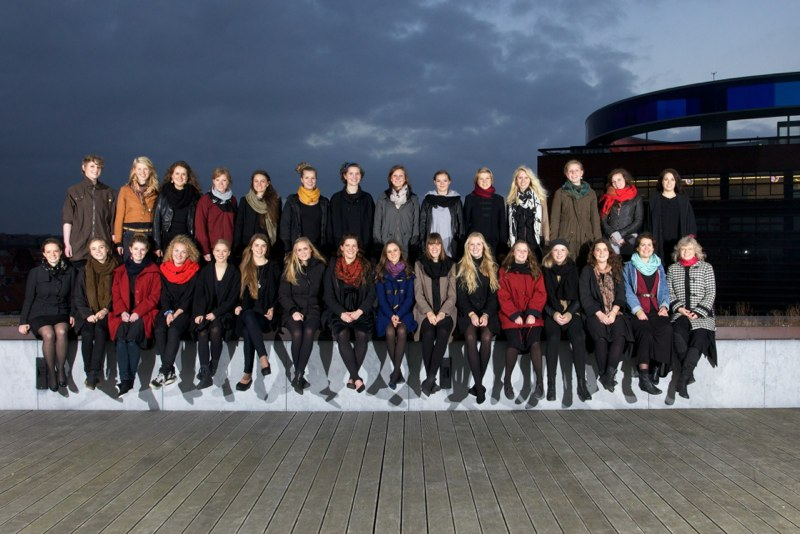
- The Aarhus Girls' Choir in 2015
- Origin: Aarhus
- Genre: Girls' choir
- Members: c. 30
- Director: Birgitte Næslund Madsen (2021-) Helle Høyer Vedel (2002-2021)
- Affiliation: Aarhus
- Awards: World Choir Games, Xiamen, 2006; World Choir Games, Riga, 2014; Let the Peoples Sing, Munich, 2015
- Website: www.aarhuspigekor.dk

The Aarhus Girls' Choir (Aarhus Pigekor) is an organized group of young female singers based in Aarhus, Denmark. The choir, which has up to 35 members aged between 15 and 25, is currently under the direction of Birgitte Næslund Madsen. It forms part of the Aarhus School of Music, the city's largest music school. The choir regularly performs concerts in Denmark and has an international orientation with tours and participation in international contests.

A voice test is required of those wishing to join the choir and its members are expected to be active in secondary social activities. The choir cooperates with the Danish National Opera and Aarhus Symphony Orchestra and frequently holds concerts both nationally and internationally.

The choir has recorded two CDs, Jorden rundt med Aarhus Pigekor in 2008 and Perler og Krystaller in 2015.

== Awards ==
The choir has participated in the World Choir Games numerous times and won gold in 2006 (Xiamen) and 2014 (Riga). In 2016 the World Choir Games ranked the choir 41st out of 1000 overall and 5th in the Female Choir category.
