= Mark Anthony Carpio =

Mark Anthony Austria Carpio
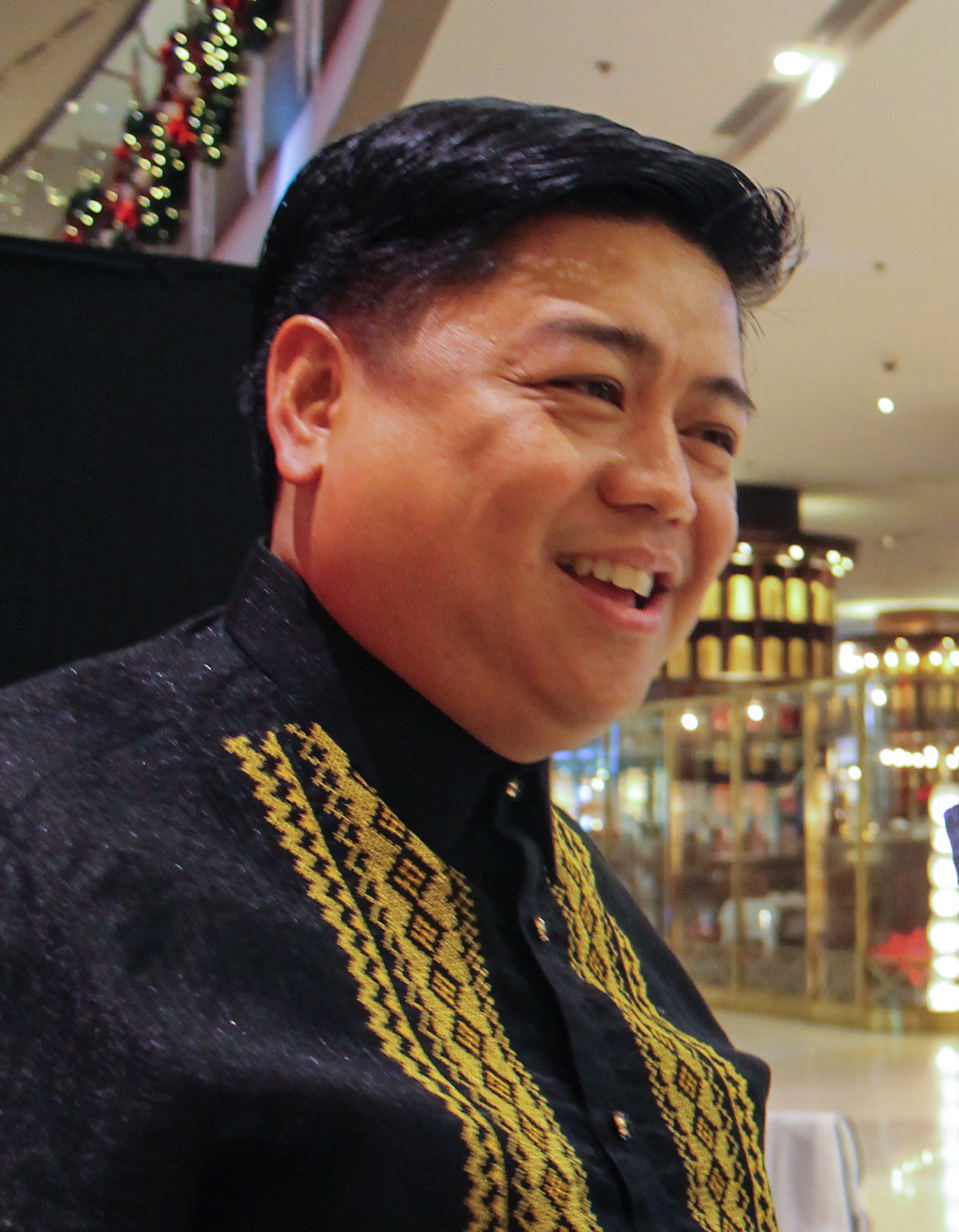
- Mark Anthony Carpio

Background information
- Born: Mark Anthony A. Carpio
- Origin: Quezon City, Philippines
- Genres: Choral music, classical music, folk music, pop music
- Occupations: Conductor, singer, pianist/accompanist, lecturer, countertenor
- Instruments: Voice, piano
- Years active: 2001–present

Mark Anthony Carpio is a choral conductor, choirmaster, piano accompanist and a countertenor, who is the present choirmaster of the Philippine Madrigal Singers, Kilyawan Boys Choir, Voces Aurorae, Pansol Choir, and the Madz Schola Cantorum. He is also a faculty member at the Conducting and Choral Ensemble Department of the University of the Philippines College of Music in Diliman, Quezon City, Philippines.

== Biography ==
Mark Anthony Carpio became the second Choirmaster of the acclaimed Philippine Madrigal Singers in 2001, when he was selected to succeed its founder National Artist of the Philippines, Andrea O. Veneracion. Carpio has taken the already much-awarded choir to even greater heights, when he led them to win first prizes in the Habanera and Polyphony categories in the International Habaneras and Polyphony Contest (Torrevieja, Spain, 2004), the Grand Prix in the 35th Florilege Vocal de Tours, France (2006), the Grand Prize in the European Grand Prix for Choral Singing (Arrezo, Italy, 2007), and the Grand Prix in the 64th Concorso Polifonico Guido d’Arezzo (Arezzo, Italy, 2016). Under his leadership, the choir continues to fulfill a grueling schedule of yearly international concert tours, national outreach programs and its regular concert season as the resident choir of the Cultural Center of the Philippines (CCP).

Carpio has served as the artistic director of the CCP's Hands-On Choral Workshop since 2001 and the Andrea O. Veneracion International Choral Festival since 2013. He conducts the Sing Philippines Youth Choir, which draws its fifty members biennially from all provinces of the country, in honor of the Madrigal Singers' founder, who established the vision of a nation singing together in harmony and united in song. Carpio also directs the other Sing Philippines projects which include choral music workshops and conductor/singer development initiatives. He is the artistic director for the MADZ Music Studios, which strives to go beyond in teaching students on how to sing or play but to instill in them on how they can inspire others, as they work in making music together.

Known for his collaboration with emerging composers, innovative programming, and approachability, Carpio is a much sought-after choral clinician and coach, frequently giving extensive and in-depth workshops all over the Philippines and around the world. He is frequently invited as adjudicator in choral competitions and as guest conductor of choirs around the world, including the first batch of the Indonesia Youth Choir (2015).

Carpio is a faculty member of the Conducting and Choral Ensemble Department of the University of the Philippines College of Music, where he earned his master's degree in Choral Conducting and his bachelor's degree in Piano.

Nurturing young singers is a personal passion of Carpio. He directs the Consortium of Voices, a choral society of young choristers, consisting of the Kilyawan Boys Choir, Kilyawan Male Choir and the Voces Auroræ Girls Choir. He also conducts the Pansol Choir, a church-based community choir based in Quezon City. He serves as the conductor and chorus class teacher of the Madz Schola Cantorum as well, a performing arts high school where the top 20–25 students across the Philippines are awarded a full scholarship as they are trained in singing, playing an instrument and choral music.

Carpio is also a vocal accompanist and coach, and a countertenor soloist.
