= Let the People Sing (contest) =

Former BBC Radio choir contest

Let the People Sing was a choir contest run and broadcast by BBC Radio from 1950s to 1980s. The contest also led to new choral works being commissioned.

In 1959 The Fenland Singers, conducted by Catherine M. Baxter, won the mixed voice competition. In 1958 they had come second when Agnes Duncan's choir had won the children's and the youth class. Both the 1958 and 1959 finals were held in the Royal Festival Hall. In 1961 Agnes Duncan's choir again won the children's and the youth class.

It became an international competition, also called Let the Peoples Sing, in 1965.
