= European Grand Prix for Choral Singing =

Annual choral competition

The European Grand Prix for Choral Singing (in French, Grand Prix Européen de Chant Choral, commonly abbreviated as European Choral Grand Prix or EGP) is an annual choral competition between the winners of six European choral competitions. It was inaugurated in 1989.

Despite its name, the EGP is not limited to European choirs; this is because choirs from any country can join the choral competitions in any of the EGP’s member-cities. As of 1995, one choir from Japan, one choir from Argentina, two choirs from Indonesia, and two choirs from the United States have won the EGP, while two choirs from the Philippines and United States have won the EGP twice. In addition, the contest is not limited to adult choirs; three of the grand prize-winning choirs are children's choirs.

As of 2022, four choirs had won the EGP twice: the University of the Philippines Madrigal Singers (1997 and 2007), APZ Tone Tomšič (2002 and 2008), University of Utah Chamber Choir (renamed from the University of Utah Singers) (2006 and 2015), and Vesna Children's Choir (2000 and 2017).

The 30th European Grand Prix for Choral Singing taking place in Maribor, Slovenia, on April 21, 2018 had the first win from an Indonesian choir. The Resonanz Children's Choir (TRCC), led by conductor Avip Priatna, has won an award at the EGP 2018.

In the summer of 2019, Youth choir "Kamēr..." became the 1st and currently the only choir having won the EGP three times (2004, 2013, and 2019). On October 26th 2025 "Kamēr..." accomplished the fourth EGP title in Tolosa, Basque Country, Spain.

As of 2022, two conductors have won the EGP twice: Stojan Kuret (2002 and 2010) and Avip Priatna (2018 and 2022).

== Organizing committee and member cities ==
The EGP is organized by the organizing committees of the following choral competitions, from which the EGP contenders are selected:

1. Concorso Polifónico Guido d'Arezzo (International Guido d'Arezzo Polyphonic Contest) - Arezzo, Province of Arezzo, Italy
2. Béla Bartók International Choir Competition - Debrecen, Hajdú-Bihar county, Hungary
3. International Choral Competition Gallus Maribor - Maribor, Slovenia
4. Certamen Coral de Tolosa (Tolosa Choral Competition) - Tolosa, Basque Country, Spain
5. International Baltic Sea Choir Competition (IBSCC) - Jūrmala, Region of Jūrmala, Latvia
6. International May Choir Competition «Prof. G. Dimitrov» - Varna, Varna Province, Bulgaria

Each individual contest is usually referred to by the name of its host city instead of the competition's official title. The grand prize winners of each contest are automatically eligible to compete at the EGP.

The hosting of each annual EGP competition is rotated among the six member cities.

== History ==
The European Grand Prix for Choral Singing was created in 1988 through the initiative of the competitions of AREZZO (Italy), DEBRECEN (Hungary), GORIZIA (Italy) and TOURS (France) Two others have also been associated: VARNA (Bulgaria) in 1989, and TOLOSA (Basque Country/Spain) in 1990. In 2008 Gorizia stepped out of the Association and MARIBOR (Slovenia) joined it. In 2024, JURMALA (Latvia) became a new member and TOURS (France) ceased its activity.

== Regulations ==
=== Eligibility ===
As mentioned earlier, the contest is open only to the grand prize winners of the six-member European choral competitions in the previous year. In other words, if a choir wins the grand prize in any of the six cities' choral contests, it is eligible for then next year's EGP. Consequently, this also means that, unlike other choral competitions, the EGP does not solicit participants to the contest; no choir may directly apply or audition in order to join the EGP. If an eligible choir backs out, a substitute choir may take its place; as a penalty, any choir that backs out will not be eligible to compete in any of the six qualifying contests for the next year.

No choir may win the grand prize in more than one qualifying competition in a single year. For example, if a choir is named the grand prize winner in Arezzo, it is automatically disqualified to compete in the contests in the five remaining cities for the rest of the year.

There are no specific regulations prohibiting a former finalist (or even a former laureate) from competing in (or even winning again) the EGP more than once. The Philippine Madrigal Singers (laureate of the 1997 EGP) have won the 2006 Florilège Vocal de Tours, going on to win the Grand Prize in 2007 in Arezzo, Italy. In the same competition, the Madrigal Singers competed with the Vesna Children's Choir (laureate of the 2000 EGP), who won the grand prize of the 2006 Tolosa competition.

=== Repertoire and choir membership ===
Each competing choir is required to sing in the same group/category as they performed in respective competitions. Choirs are encouraged to perform songs from various eras and composers. Songs with accompaniment (by any instrument) are allowed as long as the total length of accompanied songs does not exceed ten (10) minutes. The host city determines the total maximum performance time allowed to each finalist.

Each competing choir is also required to have the same number of singers it had from the qualifying competition, plus or minus ten percent (10%) of that number. The total number of singers per choir may be a minimum of 12 singers and a maximum of 60 singers regardless of the number of voice sections or groups; this is because the eligibility requirements vary for each of the six qualifying competitions. Because of this, it is possible for mixed-voice choirs to compete directly against all-male and all-female choirs; it is also possible for children's choirs to compete against adult choirs (and even win, as in 2000, 2001, 2017, and 2018).

=== The grand prize winner ===
The EGP grand prize winner, or laureate, is awarded a diploma, a trophy and additional prizes to be determined by the host city, including a cash prize of up to €4,000 (usually awarded).

The EGP winner is not allowed to compete in any international choral competition, member of the European Grand Prix Association, for two years.

== Laureates ==
The following are the lists of grand prize winners for the European Grand Prix for Choral Singing.

=== Laureates per year ===
Laureates of the European Grand Prix for Choral Singing per year
| Year | Edition | Host | Choir | Director/Conductor | City of Origin | Country of Origin |
|---|---|---|---|---|---|---|
| 1989 | 1 | (Italy) Arezzo | Kammerkoret Hymnia | Poul Emborg and Fleming Windekilde | Copenhagen | Denmark |
| 1990 | 2 | (Hungary) Debrecen | (postponed) | NA | NA | NA |
| 1991 | 3 | (France) Tours | Chamber Choir of the Conservatoire | Tadas Šumskas | Vilnius | Lithuania |
| 1992 | 4 | (Italy) Gorizia | St Jacobs Kammarkör | Gary Graden | Stockholm | Sweden |
| 1993 | 5 | (Bulgaria) Varna | Jauna Musica | Vaclovas Augustinas and Romas Skapas | Vilnius | Lithuania |
| 1994 | 6 | (Spain) Tolosa | The Mats Nilsson Vocal Ensemble | Mats Nilsson | Stockholm | Sweden |
| 1995 | 7 | (Italy) Arezzo | Kallos Choir | Fumiaki Kuriyama | Tokyo | Japan |
| 1996 | 8 | (Hungary) Debrecen | Pro Musica Leánykar | Dénes Szabó | Nyíregyháza | Hungary |
| 1997 | 9 | (France) Tours | University of the Philippines Madrigal Singers | Andrea Veneracion | Quezon City | Philippines |
| 1998 | 10 | (Italy) Gorizia | University of Mississippi Concert Singers | Jerry Jordan | Oxford, MS | United States |
| 1999 | 11 | (Bulgaria) Varna | Lunds Vocal Ensemble | Ingemar Månsson | Lund | Sweden |
| 2000 | 12 | (Spain) Tolosa | Vesna Children Choir (Note: Link to Classical archives; not an official web site for the Vesna Children Choir) | Alexander Ponomariov | Moscow | Russia |
| 2001 | 13 | (Hungary) Debrecen | Magnificat Children's and Youth Choir | Valéria Szebellédi | Budapest | Hungary |
| 2002 | 14 | (Italy) Arezzo | A.P.Z. Tone Tomsic | Stojan Kuret | Ljubljana | Slovenia |
| 2003 | 15 | (France) Tours | Kamerinis choras Brevis | Gintautas Venislovas | Vilnius | Lithuania |
| 2004 | 16 | (Italy) Gorizia | Youth Choir "Kamer..." | Māris Sirmais | Riga | Latvia |
| 2005 | 17 | (Bulgaria) Varna | Allmänna Sången | Cecilia Rydinger Alin | Uppsala | Sweden |
| 2006 | 18 | (Spain) Tolosa | University of Utah Singers | Brady Allred | Salt Lake City | United States |
| 2007 | 19 | (Italy) Arezzo | University of the Philippines Madrigal Singers | Mark Anthony Carpio | Quezon City | Philippines |
| 2008 | 20 | (Hungary) Debrecen | A.P.Z. Tone Tomsic | Urša Lah | Ljubljana | Slovenia |
| 2009 | 21 | (France) Tours | Coro Universitario de Mendoza | Silvana Vallesi | Mendoza | Argentina |
| 2010 | 22 | (Bulgaria) Varna | Vokalna akademija Ljubljana | Stojan Kuret | Ljubljana | Slovenia |
| 2011 | 23 | (Spain) Tolosa | The Swedish Chamber Choir | Simon Phipps | Gothenburg | Sweden |
| 2012 | 24 | (Slovenia) Maribor | Sofia Vokalensemble | Bengt Ollén | Stockholm | Sweden |
| 2013 | 25 | (Italy) Arezzo | Youth Choir "Kamer..." | Jānis Liepiņš | Riga | Latvia |
| 2014 | 26 | (Hungary) Debrecen | S:t Jacobs Ungdomskör | Mikael Wedar | Stockholm | Sweden |
| 2015 | 27 | (France) Tours | University of Utah Chamber Choir (Note: Renamed from the University of Utah Singers) | Barlow Bradford | Salt Lake City | United States |
| 2016 | 28 | (Bulgaria) Varna | UT Insieme Vocale Consonante | Lorenzo Donati | Santa Firmina | Italy |
| 2017 | 29 | (Spain) Tolosa | Vesna Children Choir (Note: Link to Classical archives; not an official web site for the Vesna Children Choir) | Nadezhda Averina | Moscow | Russia |
| 2018 | 30 | (Slovenia) Maribor | The Resonanz Children's Choir | Avip Priatna | Jakarta | Indonesia |
| 2019 | 31 | (Italy) Arezzo | Youth Choir "Kamer..." | Aivis Greters | Riga | Latvia |
| 2020 | 32 | (Hungary) Debrecen | (postponed) | NA | NA | NA |
| 2021 | (not held) | (not held) | NA | NA | NA | NA |
| 2022 | 33 | (France) Tours | Batavia Madrigal Singers | Avip Priatna | Jakarta | Indonesia |
| 2023 | 34 | (Hungary) Debrecen | Chamber Choir Sophia | Olexii Shamrytskyi | Kyiv | Ukraine |
| 2024 | 35 | (Bulgaria) Varna | Zero 8 | Rasmus Krigström | Stockholm | Sweden |
| 2025 | 36 | (Spain) Tolosa | Youth Choir "Kamer..." | Jurģis Cābulis | Riga | Latvia |
| Total | | | 34 laureates (none in 1990,2020 and 2021) | | | |

=== Laureates per country ===
Laureates of the European Grand Prix for Choral Singing per country
| Country | Laureates | Notes |
| Sweden | 8 wins | Five choirs from Stockholm |
| Latvia | 4 wins | Jauniesu koris "Kamer..." winning four times – 1st and only choir to win both three and four times |
| Lithuania | 3 wins | All from Vilnius |
| Slovenia | 3 wins | All from Ljubljana; APZ Tone Tomšič winning twice |
| United States | 3 wins | University of Utah Chamber Choir (renamed from University of Utah Singers) winning twice |
| Russia | 2 wins | Vesna Children's Choir winning twice |
| Hungary | 2 wins | |
| Philippines | 2 wins | Philippine Madrigal Singers winning twice - 1st choir to win twice |
| Indonesia | 2 wins | All from Jakarta |
| Argentina | 1 win | |
| Denmark | 1 win | |
| Japan | 1 win | |
| Italy | 1 win | |
| Ukraine | 1 win | |
| Total | 34 wins | |

=== Laureates per continent ===
Laureates of the European Grand Prix for Choral Singing per continent
| Continent | Laureates |
| Europe | 25 wins |
| Asia | 5 wins |
| North America | 3 wins |
| South America | 1 win |
| Total | 34 wins |
