= Ko Matsushita =

Japanese conductor and composer (born 1962)

Ko Matsushita (松下 耕, born 16 October 1962) is a Japanese conductor and composer.

Matsushita was born and raised in Tokyo. He studied composition in the Kunitachi College of Music and chorus conducting in the Kodály Institute in Kecskemét, Hungary. As of 2009, he conducts 10 choirs, and has won international Choir prizes with some of them.

== Works ==
- 狩俣ぬくいちゃ (Karimatanu Kuicha)
- O lux beata Trinitas (for mixed choir)
- "Tanpopo" (ja), song to lyrics by (ja) Hourai Taizou
