= Let the Peoples Sing =

International choral competition

- Logo for the 2019 edition held in Barcelona
- Awarded for: Singing
- Sponsored by: European Choral Association
- Location: Various (in 2024, Broadcasting House)
- Country: Various (in 2024, United Kingdom)
- Presented by: Various national broadcasters (in 2024, BBC Radio 3)
- Formerly called: Let the People Sing
- Reward: The Silver Rose Bowl
- First award: 1961; 65 years ago
- Final award: 2024; 2 years ago

Highlights
- Most recent winner: Copenhagen Girls' Choir (2024)
- Website: Let the Peoples Sing

Television/radio coverage
- Network: Eurovision and Euroradio
- Related: Eurovision Choir

Let the Peoples Sing (known until 1964 as Let the People Sing) is an international choral competition currently organised by the European Broadcasting Union (EBU). The final, encompassing three categories and around ten choirs, is offered as a live broadcast to all EBU members. The Silver Rose Bowl is awarded to the best choir in the competition.

== History ==
The competition was first organised by BBC Radio in 1957, originally as a national contest for amateur British choirs under the title Let the People Sing, and ran until 1982 as a weekly series each year. The final round of the first competition was broadcast in the Light Programme on 23 April 1957 and was followed four days later by a special concert relayed from the Royal Albert Hall. In the two subsequent years (1958–59) the final concert was held at the Royal Festival Hall. The contest also led to new choral works being commissioned.

In 1965 the annual competition became an international one, with participation extended to include choirs from Denmark, Finland, Norway, and Sweden. It was further extended in the 1970s with entrants also coming from other countries with radio networks belonging to the EBU, each of the networks organising the national qualifying rounds leading to the international finals. Broadcasters submitted tapes of the choirs which they entered, and these were then listened to and evaluated by the professional jury who decided the winners in each category. There was no broadcast of the entire competition at this time. In 1993, the Euroradio-networked choral competition moved to a biennial schedule, held in the autumn of odd-numbered years. In 1995, at the initiative of Danish Radio, it was decided that while recordings would continue to be used for the preliminary rounds, however the finals should be hosted as a live radio event. These were broadcast via the Union's Euroradio satellite network, with the choirs performing in their home cities to listeners across Europe and to the jury. Since 2001, the finalists have been invited to perform at a concert by the host broadcaster. The competition has become more or less a festival with many more concerts and a supporting workshop program.

After the 1982 competition, the BBC ceased broadcasting the national selection and international heats, and for a number of years aired only the final round. The BBC had hosted the international finals since its inception. In 1983, Germany's national public radio broadcaster Deutschlandradio hosted the final round, they were later joined as host by Finnish broadcaster Yle from 1987; both took over the organisation of the competition held on an alternating basis in Cologne and Helsinki respectively. The 1991 competition finals was the last to be held in Finland until 2017.

In 1984, BBC Two broadcast a new national competition in association with Sainsbury's supermarket; Choir of the Year ran every two years until 2002, however after Sainsbury's sponsorship ended that year, it was taken over by BBC Radio 3 (supported by Arts Council England and Sing Up) in 2005 where it continued until 2016. BBC Four aired highlights of the final. The winning choir often proceeded to represent the UK at the international Let the Peoples Sing competition.

Since the late 1990s, Radio 3's broadcast of Let the Peoples Sing has moved away from the main evening concert (except when hosting in 2011), towards coverage in specific choral programmes such as Performance on 3 (1999, 2003), Choirworks (2001–2003), Choir and Organ (2007–2011), The Choir (2009, 2013–2015) and since 2017, Through the Night. BBC Radio 3 hosted the 2001 and 2003 competitions live from the Queen Elizabeth Hall, in London and the 2011 edition was staged at the new MediaCityUK studios in Salford, Greater Manchester.

In 2019, the competition took place in Spain for the first time and was hosted by Catalunya Ràdio, at the 2,049-seat Palau de la Música Catalana in Barcelona on 13 October. The previous competition, hosted by Finnish broadcaster Yle, took place at the Helsinki Music Centre on 15 October 2017. German radio station BR-Klassik hosted the 2015 edition in Munich at the Funkhaus studios. Luxembourg’s Philharmonic Hall was the host venue in 2013.

In November 2021, the 60th anniversary was celebrated with the BBC Singers performing a dedicated concert at St Peter's Church, Eaton Square, in London that was later broadcast by BBC Radio 3 and many other EBU radio stations. The next competition took place on 6 October 2024 with the competing choirs, selected for the final concert, performing from their home countries. The winner was decided by an eight-member jury panel who voted from the BBC's Broadcasting House in London. For the first time, a youth jury prize was awarded in collaboration with the European Choral Association.

== Categories ==
The competition has three categories, with a winner selected in each category in addition to the overall winner of the Silver Rose Bowl.

- Children and Youth (no members over age 25)
- Adult (any age)
- Open, for choruses who perform music of particular cultural traditions or styles (e.g. folksong, gospel, barbershop, jazz, traditional music, etc.)

== List of winners ==
=== By competition ===
Let the Peoples Sing – Winners of the Silver Rose Bowl (since 1961)
Year	Choir	Chorus Master	Country of origin	Host city
1961	Glasgow Phoenix Choir	Peter Mooney	Scotland	London
1962	Barrhead Philomen Singers	Mina Forrest	Scotland	London
1963	Orpington Junior Singers	Sheila Mossman MBE	England	London
1964	Redhill Madrigal Singers	Joyce Hooper	England	London
1965	Glasgow Phoenix Choir	Peter Mooney	Scotland	London
1966	Orphei Drängar	Eric Ericson	Sweden	London
1967	Orphei Drängar	Eric Ericson	Sweden	London
1968	Rodna Pessen	Michel Milkov	Bulgaria	London
1969	Mariakören Västerås	Bror Samuelsson	Sweden	London
1970	Louis Halsey Singers	Louis Halsey	England	London
1971	Tapiolan Yhteiskoulun Kuoro	Erkki Pohjola	Finland	London
1972	NRK Jentekor	Marie Foss	Norway	London
1973	Gara Iskar Cultural Center Chorus	Unknown	Bulgaria	London
1973	Ifjúsági Egyetemi Chorus	Rezső Lantos	Hungary	London
1974	ELTE Béla Bartók Chorus	Gábor Baross	Hungary	London
1975	NRK Jentekor	Marie Foss	Norway	London
1976	Ontario Youth Choir	Jon Washburn	Canada	London
1977	Veszprém Város Vegyeskara	István Zámbó	Hungary	London
1978	Franz Liszt Chamber Chorus	István Párkai	Hungary	London
1979	Exeter College Choir	Unknown	England	London
1979	Marktoberdorf Large Chamber Choir	Unknown	West Germany	London
1980	Candomino	Tauno Satomaa	Finland	London
1980	Váci Vox Humana	József Maklári	Hungary	London
1981	NRK Studio Chorus	Marie Foss	Norway	London
1982	Stockholm Motet Choir	Per Borin	Sweden	London
1983	"Júlia Bányai" Elementary School Choir	Katalin Weiser-Kiss	Hungary	Cologne
1984	Frankfurt Chamber Chorus	Hans Michael Beuerle	West Germany	Cologne
1985	Bergen Cathedral Choir	Magnar Mangersnes	Norway	Cologne
1986	Gösta Ohlin Vocal Ensemble	Gösta Ohlin	Sweden	Cologne
1987	Chamber Chorus of the Franz Liszt Music Academy, Weimar	Gerd Frischmuth	East Germany	Helsinki
1987	Hollabrunn Chamber Chorus	Herbert Böck	Austria	Helsinki
1988	Bergen Cathedral Choir	Magnar Mangersnes	Norway	Cologne
1989	Phoenix Chamber Choir	Cortland Hultberg	Canada	Helsinki
1990	Jubilate	Astrid Riska	Finland	Cologne
1990	Konzertchor Darmstadt	Wolfgang Seeliger	West Germany	Cologne
1991	Balsis	Māris Kupčs and Kaspars Putniņš	Latvia	Helsinki
1992	New Zealand National Youth Choir	Karen Grylls	New Zealand	Cologne
1993	Universitetskoret Lille MUKO	Jesper Grove Jørgensen	Denmark	Vancouver
1995	Det Norske Solistkor	Grete Helgerud	Norway	Manchester
1997	Det Jyske Kammerkor	Mogens Dahl	Denmark	Brussels
1999	Embla	Norunn Illevold Giske	Norway	Budapest
2001	Choir of the Latvian Music Academy	Arvīds Platpers	Latvia	London
2003	Pro Musica	Dénes Szabó	Hungary	London
2005	Children's Chorus of the Tallinn Music High School	Ingrid Kõrvits	Estonia	Cologne
2007	Schola Cantorum	Tone Bianca Dahl	Norway	Wuppertal
2009	Girls' Choir of the Classical Diocesan Gymnasium	Helena Fojkar Zupančič	Slovenia	Oslo
2011	The Swedish Chamber Choir	Simon Phipps	Sweden	Salford
2013	Cor Infantil Amics de la Unió de Granollers	Josep Vila i Jover	Spain	Luxembourg City
2015	Aarhus Girls' Choir	Helle Høyer Vedel	Denmark	Munich
2017	Collegium Musicale	Endrik Üksvärav	Estonia	Helsinki
2019	Barbaros	Jonas Rasmussen	Denmark	Barcelona
2021	Cancelled due to the COVID-19 pandemic			
2024	Copenhagen Girls Choir	Anne-Terese Sales	Denmark	London (jury voting)

In 1973, 1979, 1980, 1987, and 1990 the Silver Rose Bowl was awarded ex aequo.

In 2015 the Young People's Chorus of New York City (YPC) became the first American choir to place first in the competition's history of 54 years. After Sunday's competition performances among YPC, the Aarhus Girls' Choir from Denmark and the Romanian Radio Children's Choir, the judges named the Danish choir the winner. However, on Monday morning, the judges rethought their initial decision and determined that the American chorus should tie with the Danish choir for first place in the Children's and Youth category. However, the Aarhus Girls' Choir ultimately prevailed in the finals of the competition.

=== By country ===
The table below shows the years that a country won the Silver Rose Bowl.

Country	Wins	Years won
Norway	8	1972; 1975; 1981; 1985; 1988; 1995; 1999; 2007
Hungary	7	1973; 1974; 1977; 1978; 1980; 1983; 2003
Sweden	6	1966; 1967; 1969; 1982; 1986; 2011
Denmark	5	1993; 1997; 2015; 2019; 2024
England	4	1963; 1964; 1970; 1979
Germany	4	1979; 1984; 1987; 1990
Scotland	3	1961; 1962; 1965
Finland	3	1971; 1980; 1990
Bulgaria	2	1968; 1973
Canada	2	1976; 1989
Latvia	2	1991; 2001
Estonia	2	2005; 2017
Austria	1	1987
New Zealand	1	1992
Slovenia	1	2009
Spain	1	2013

Years in italics indicate joint wins (ex aequo)
