= Chamber choir =

Small- or medium-sized choir

A chamber choir is a small or medium-sized choir of roughly 8 to 40 singers (occasionally called "chamber singers"), typically singing classical or religious music in a concert setting. This is distinct from, for example, a church choir, which sings in religious services, or choirs specializing in popular music such as a barbershop chorus.

== See also ==
- International Chamber Choir Competition Marktoberdorf, held every two years.
