= International Chamber Choir Competition Marktoberdorf =

Biannual German choir competition

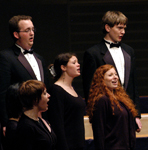
International Chamber Choir Competition, 2005.

The International Chamber Choir Competition Marktoberdorf is a competition for chamber choirs held every two years in Marktoberdorf, near Munich in southern Germany.

Founded in 1989, the 14th competition was held 22–27 May 2015. In the first 13 competitions, nearly 200 choirs from more than 40 countries participated.
