= Insomnia (disambiguation) =

Insomnia is a sleep disorder.

Insomnia may also refer to:

== Companies ==
- Insomnia Coffee Company, a chain of coffee shops in the Republic of Ireland
- Insomnia Cookies, a chain of bakeries in the US
- Insomnia Publications, a defunct UK comic-book publisher

== Film and television ==
- Insomnia (1997 film), a Norwegian thriller, directed by Erik Skjoldbjærg
- Insomnia (2002 film), an American remake of the Norwegian film, directed by Christopher Nolan
- Insomnia (TV series), a 2024 British thriller TV series
- Insomnia, a Brazilian television show hosted by Jackeline Petkovic

== Literature ==
- Insomnia (novel), a 1994 novel by Stephen King
- Insomnia, a 2005 short-story collection by Jeremy Robinson
- Insomnia, a 2015 poetry collection by Linda Pastan
- Insomnia (comics), a fictional character from DC Comics

== Music ==
- Insomnia (band), a Bengali rock band
- Insomnia (composition), an orchestral piece by Esa-Pekka Salonen, 2002
- Insomnia Festival, an annual electronic music festival in Tromsø, Norway

=== Albums ===
- Insomnia (Chihiro Onitsuka album), 2001
- Insomnia (Erick Sermon album), 1996
- Insomnia (Hed PE album), 2007
- Insomnia (Miach album) or the title song, 2023
- Insomnia (Skepta, Chip and Young Adz album), 2020
- Insomnia (soundtrack), from the 1997 film, by Biosphere
- Insomnia: The Best of Faithless or the title song (see below), 2009
- Insomnia (The Hiatus EP) or the title song, 2009
- Insomnia (Washington EP) or the title song, 2011
- Insomnia, by Deinonychus, 2004
- Insomnia, a mixtape by The Alchemist, 2003

=== Songs ===
- "Insomnia" (Craig David song), 2008
- "Insomnia" (Daya song), 2019
- "Insomnia" (Faithless song), 1995
- "Insomnia" (Feeder song), 1999
- "Insomnia", by Ashley Tisdale from Symptoms, 2019
- "Insomnia", by Atreyu from The Beautiful Dark of Life, 2023
- "Insomnia", by Audien, 2015
- "Insomnia", by Caroline Polachek from Pang, 2019
- "Insomnia", by Coldrain from The Side Effects, 2019
- "Insomnia", by Cynthia Alexander from Insomnia & Other Lullabyes, 1996
- "Insomnia", by Ellen Benediktson during Melodifestivalen 2015
- "Insomnia", by Haken from Visions, 2011
- "Insomnia", by In Hearts Wake from In Hearts Wake, 2015
- "Insomnia", by Jelena Karleuša from Diva, 2012
- "Insomnia", by Kamelot from Haven, 2015
- "Insomnia", by Koop Arponen from New Town, 2009
- "Insomnia", by L2, 2012
- "Insomnia", by Megadeth from Risk, 1999
- "Insomnia", by Parannoul from After the Magic, 2023
- "Insomnia", by Periphery from Periphery, 2010
- "Insomnia", by Pete Philly and Perquisite from Mindstate, 2005
- "Insomnia", by The Records from Shades in Bed (also known as The Records), 1979
- "Insomnia", by Silkworm from It'll Be Cool, 2004
- "Insomnia", by Silverchair from Young Modern, 2007
- "Insomnia", by Stray Kids from I Am Who, 2018
- "Insomnia", by Takeoff from The Last Rocket, 2018
- "Insomnia", by the Veronicas, a B-side of the single "Hook Me Up", 2007
- "Insomnia", by Yellow Magic Orchestra from Solid State Survivor, 1979
- "Insomnia", by Zayn from Icarus Falls, 2018
- "Insomnia", by Zerobaseone from Cinema Paradise, 2024

== Other uses ==
- Insomnia Gaming Festival, a UK video-gaming event run by Multiplay Ltd.

== See also ==
- Insomniac (disambiguation)
- Insomnio (disambiguation)
- "Insomya", a song by the Eraserheads from Circus
