= The Best of Echobelly =

Compilation album by Echobelly
- Released: March 24, 2008
- Recorded: 1993–2001
- Genre: Rock, pop
- Length: 55:31

Echobelly chronology
Gravity Pulls (2004)	The Best of Echobelly (2008)	Anarchy and Alchemy (2017)

The Best of Echobelly is the second greatest hits collection from rock band Echobelly, released in 2008. The songs on the album all come from the band's first three albums, Everyone's Got One, On and Lustra.

== Track listing ==
All songs written by Sonya Madan and Glenn Johansson.

1. "King of the Kerb" – 3:59
2. "Bellyache" – 4:27
3. "Today, Tomorrow, Sometime Never" – 3:35
4. "Dark Therapy" – 4:56
5. "Insomniac" – 3:46
6. "The World Is Flat" – 4:57
7. "Bulldog Baby" – 4:32
8. "Father Ruler King Computer" – 2:40
9. "Go Away" – 2:43
10. "Give Her a Gun" – 3:36
11. "Great Things" – 3:30
12. "Nobody Like You" – 3:51
13. "I Can't Imagine The World Without Me" – 3:23
14. "Cold Feet, Warm Heart" – 3:26
15. "Car Fiction (French Version)" – 2:30
- Tracks 2, 3, 5, 8, 10, 13, and 14 are from Everyone's Got One.
- Tracks 1, 4, 9, 11, 12 and 15 are from On.
- Tracks 6 and 7 are from Lustra.
