= Cynthia Alexander =

- Born: Cynthia Veronica Ayala; 1971 (age 54–55)
- Origin: Philippines
- Genres: World music
- Occupations: musical performer, singer-songwriter, recording artist, Art of Living teacher, visual artist
- Instruments: vocals, acoustic guitar, bass guitar, keyboards, agong, percussion
- Formerly of: Hayp; Humanfolk

Cynthia Alexander (b. Cynthia Veronica Ayala, 1971) is a singer-songwriter and multi-instrumentalist originally from the Philippines.

== Career ==
She has performed on local and international stages including the Rainforest World Music Festival in Malaysia, the Jack Daniel's World Music Tour in Singapore and the Southeast Asian Night Market Festival in New Zealand. She also played gongs and electric bass in foreign engagements (India, U.S., Japan, Canada) with Joey Ayala at ang Bagong Lumad.

As an indie artist, she has released four albums, and is involved in a wide variety of music projects. She composed the eclectic musical score for the Ballet Philippines production, "Wagas", for which she fused electronic, industrial, indigenous, contemporary and pop elements into a cohesive work.

Cynthia is also a self-taught visual artist. She currently resides in Seattle, Washington. She is the sibling of folk-rock singer-songwriter Joey Ayala.

== Recordings ==
This is a listing of her solo and collaboration albums. She has collaborated many times with her brother, Joey Ayala.

Year	Album	Artist/Group	Genre	Label	Catalogue No.
1991	Hayp	Hayp	Rock	Wea Records / Universal Records	CDP-94,611
1996	Insomnia & Other Lullabyes	Cynthia Alexander	Rock, Folk, World, & Country	Dypro Records	CD-DYP 86/257-2 / ASIN:B01HV0G95Q
2000	Rippingyarns	Cynthia Alexander			ASIN:B01DAKBSBQ
2003	Remix				
2004	Sita & Rama: Papet Ramayana (Mga Awit)	Teatrong Mulat	Theatrical soundtrack		
2005	Comet's Tail	Cynthia Alexander			ASIN:B01DHI2K22
2005	Mga Awit ng Magdaragat	Joey Ayala		Universal Records	ASIN:B016V5Y9BS
2008	Pasasalamat				
2009	Walk Down the Road	Cynthia Alexander	Rock, Folk, World, & Country		Matrix / Runout: 9050701
2010	Palay, Bigas, Kanin	Joey Ayala			
2011	HUMANFOLK	Humanfolk	World music	MCA Music (Philippines)	UPC:00600753330432
2018	Even Such Is Time	Cynthia Alexander		Tacoma	ASIN:B07VD18GYW

== Awards and nominations ==
Year	Award giving body	Category	Nominated work	Results
1989	Yamaha Band Explosion National Finals		Hayp	Won
1989	1989 World Band Explosion	Best Bass Player	Hayp	Won
1998	Katha Music Awards	Album of the Year	Insomnia & Other Lullabyes	Nominated
1998	Katha Music Awards	Record of the Year	Hello Baby	Nominated
1998	Katha Music Awards	Best Alternative Music Vocal Performance	Comfort in Your Strangeness	Nominated
1998	Katha Music Awards	Best Alternative Music Vocal Performance	Hello Baby	Nominated
1998	Katha Music Awards	Best Alternative Music Vocal Performance	Malaya	Nominated
1998	Katha Music Awards	Best Alternative Music Vocal Performance	Slippin' Away	Nominated
1998	Katha Music Awards	Best Alternative Music Song	Comfort in Your Strangeness	Nominated
1998	Katha Music Awards	Best Alternative Music Song	Hello Baby	Nominated
1998	Katha Music Awards	Best Alternative Music Song	Slippin' Away	Nominated
1998	Katha Music Awards	Best Instrumental Arrangement with Accompanying Vocals	Hello Baby	Nominated
1998	Katha Music Awards	Best Instrumental Arrangement with Accompanying Vocals	Insomnia	Nominated
1998	Katha Music Awards	Best Instrumental Arrangement with Accompanying Vocals	Malaya	Nominated
1998	Katha Music Awards	Producer of the Year (shared with Maly Angres)	—N/a	Nominated
1998	Katha Music Awards	Best Alternative Music Album	Insomnia & Other Lullabyes	Won
1998	Katha Music Awards	Best New Artist Award	Insomnia & Other Lullabyes	Won
2001	NU Rock Awards	Song of the Year	"Motorbykle"	Won
2002	Katha Music Awards	Song of the Year	Kawikaan	Nominated
2002	Katha Music Awards	Best World Music Composition	Kawikaan	Nominated
2002	Katha Music Awards	Best World Music Vocal	Kawikaan	Nominated
2004	NU Rock Awards	Rock Female Icon	—N/a	Won
2005	NU Rock Awards	Guitarist of the Year	—N/a	Won
2005	NU Rock Awards	Producer of the Year (shared with Angee Rozul)	"Comet's Tail"	Won
2008	Golden Screen Awards	Best Original Song	"Comfort In Your Strangeness" from the Still Life soundtrack	Won
2011	Metropop Song Festival	Best World Music Composition	Kawikaan	Nominated
2012	Awit Awards	Best Jazz Recording (HUMANFOLK)	Para Sa Tao	Nominated
2012	Awit Awards	Best World Music Recording (HUMANFOLK)	Para Sa Tao	Won
2015	Jack Daniel's Indie Music Awards	Jack Daniel’s On Stage Indie Icon Award	—N/a	Won
2018	PMPC Star Awards	Acoustic Album of the Year	Even Such Is Time	Nominated
2018	PMPC Star Awards	Female Acoustic Artist of the Year	Even Such Is Time	Nominated
