= I Can't Imagine the World Without Me =

2001 greatest hits album by Echobelly

I Can't Imagine The World Without Me

Greatest hits album by Echobelly
- Released: 11 September 2001
- Recorded: 1993–2001
- Genre: Rock, pop
- Length: 66:09

Echobelly chronology
Lustra (1997)	I Can't Imagine The World Without Me (2001)	People Are Expensive (2001)

I Can't Imagine the World Without Me is the first greatest hits album released by alternative rock band Echobelly in 2001. The album is heavily biased toward the bands' first album Everyone's Got One, with 9 of the 18 songs coming from that album.

== Track listing ==
All songs written by Sonya Madan and Glenn Johansson.

1. "I Can't Imagine The World Without Me" – 3:04
2. "Insomniac" — 4:16
3. "Call Me Names" – 3:52
4. "Great Things" – 3:31
5. "The World Is Flat" – 4:04
6. "Here Comes the Big Rush" – 4:26
7. "We Know Better" – 4:03
8. "King of the Kerb" – 4:00
9. "Cold Feet, Warm Heart" – 3:29
10. "Atom" – 2:50
11. "Close… But" – 2:59
12. "Father Ruler King Computer" – 2:41
13. "Bellyache"– 4:32
14. "Iris Art" – 3:47
15. "Give Her a Gun" – 3:40
16. "Today, Tomorrow, Sometime Never" – 3:41
17. "Car Fiction" (French Version) – 2:33
18. "Dark Therapy" – 4:58
- Tracks 1, 2, 3, 9, 11, 12, 13, 15 and 16 are from Everyone's Got One.
- Tracks 4, 8, 17 and 18 are from On.
- Tracks 5, 6 and 14 are from Lustra.
- Tracks 7 & 10 are B-sides from the single "Dark Therapy".
