= Organic Music Festival =

Electronic Music Festival Series

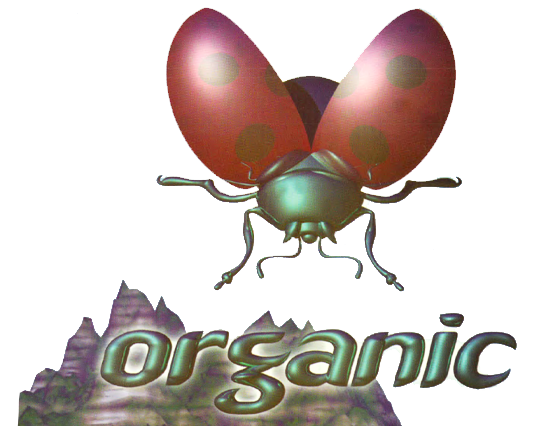

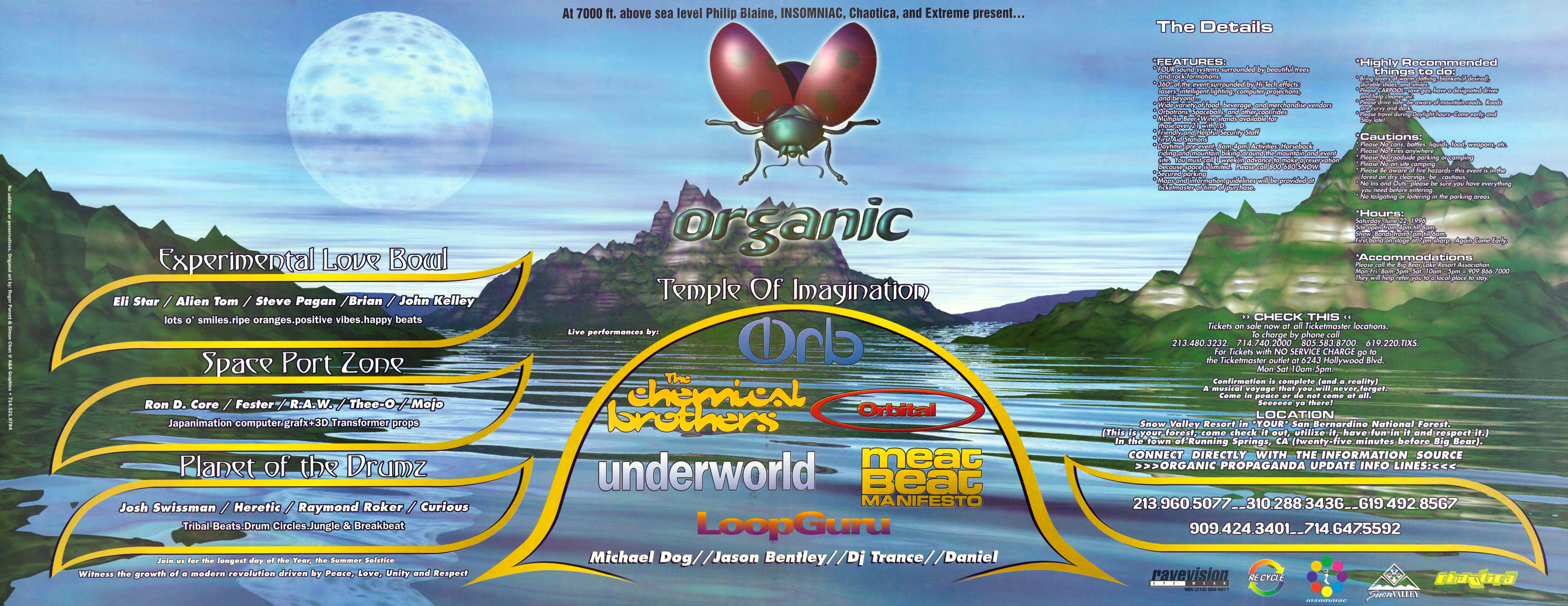
- Type: Festivals
- Industry: Music
- Founded: 1996; 30 years ago
- Headquarters: Los Angeles, California, United States
- Area served: United States
- Key people: Philip Blaine
- Products: Concerts, Festivals, Live Entertainment

Organic '96 (officially known as the Organic '96 Music Festival, or Organic) was an electronic dance music festival. Recognized as the first major festival for dance in the LA area, it was held on June 22, 1996 at the Snow Valley ski resort in Running Springs, California within the San Bernardino National Forest.

== History and production ==
The festival was produced by Philip Blaine. Due to a production window of approximately four weeks, Blaine collaborated with other Southern California promoters, including Pasquale Rotella of Insomniac for marketing, Paul Tollett from Goldenvoice for logistical and financial backing, and agent Gerry Gerard for talent support.

The timing of the festival was influenced by the Glastonbury Festival's decision to take a "fallow year" in 1996. This scheduling gap made several high-profile British electronic acts available for booking in the United States. Organic '96 was held at a mountainous ski resort with full audio and video production.

As a single-day event, Organic '96 drew an estimated 6,300 attendees, with ticket prices ranging from $25 to $30. Its success demonstrated the potential of outdoor raves for promoters including Goldenvoice's Tollet, who co-founded Coachella. The festival also introduced Tollet to dance music, influencing Coachella's booking.

The event featured a state-of-the-art Turbosound Soundsystem similar to the setup used by Pink Floyd during their The Division Bell tour in America. Organic '96 was broadcast live on the alternative rock station KROQ-FM.

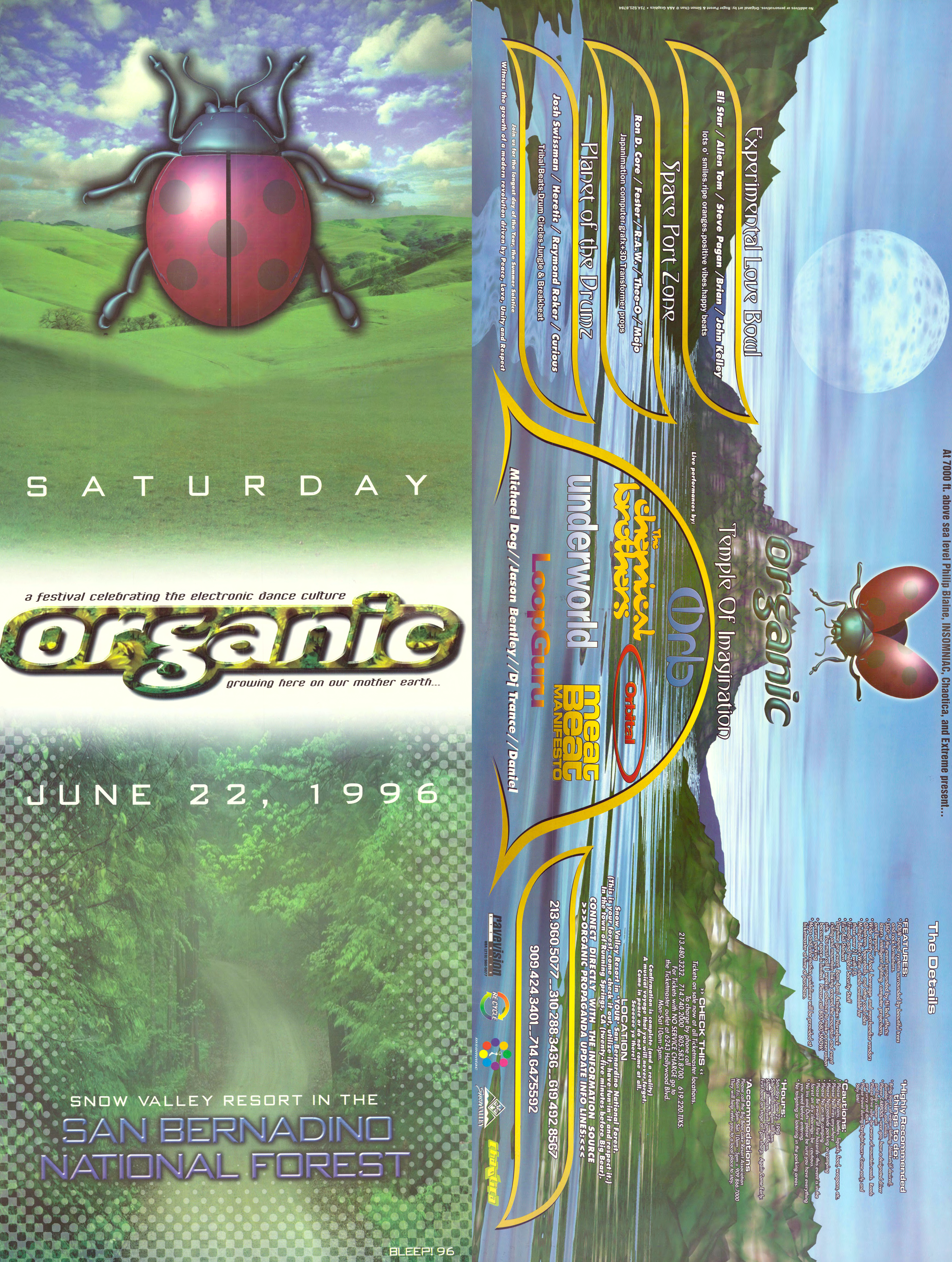
Organic '96 flyer.

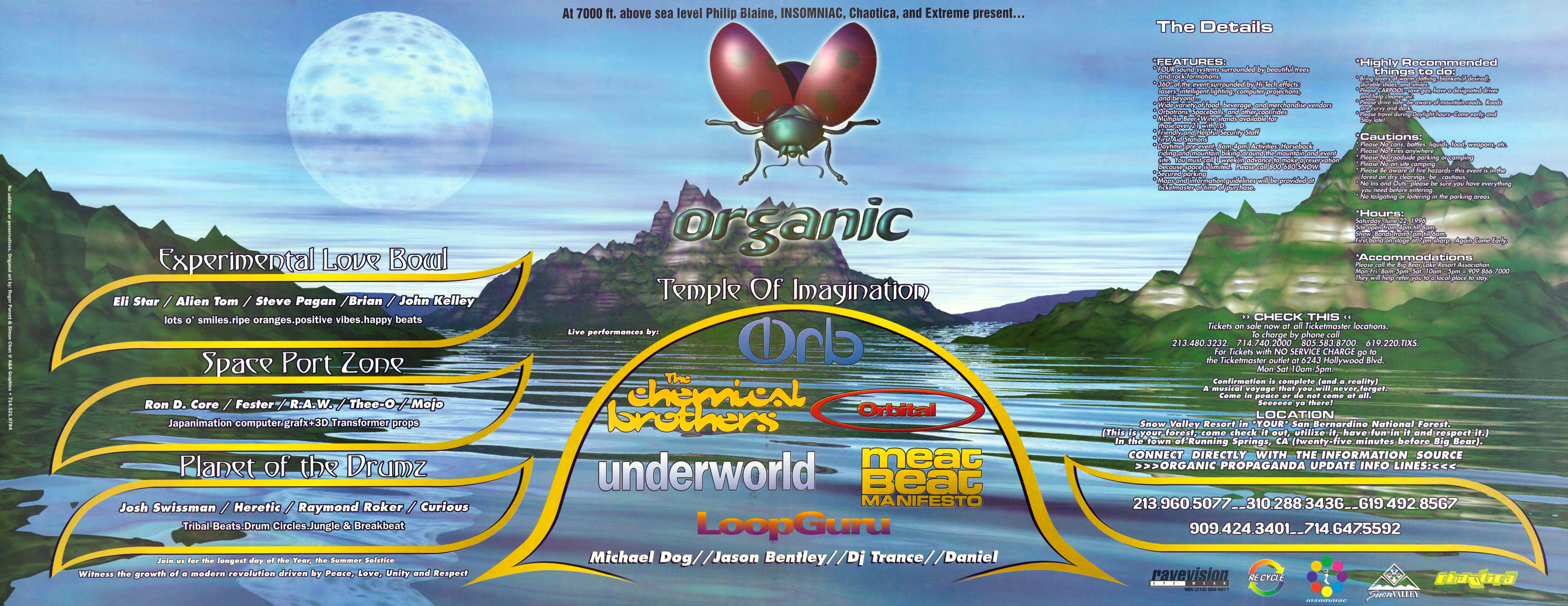
Organic '96 ad and poster design with complete lineup.

== Lineup ==
=== Main stage ===
The Organic '96 festival featured a "Main Stage" dedicated to live electronic acts—many associated with the "big beat" and techno genres—alongside side stages featuring local and international DJs. The Chemical Brothers, Underworld, Orbital, The Orb, Meat Beat Manifesto, and Loop Guru.

=== Sub-headliners and Supporting DJs ===
In addition to the live acts, eighteen DJs performed on side stages or between main stage sets. Several were representative of the 1990s West Coast dance music scene at that time. The DJs included Eli Star, Alien Tom, Steve Pagan, Brian, John Kelley, Ron D. Core, Fester, R.A.W., Thee-O, Mojo, Josh Swissman, Heretic, Raymond Roker, Curious, Michael Dog, Jason Bentley, DJ Trance, and Daniel.

== Organic '97 ==
A second event, Organic '97, was held on September 20, 1997, at the National Orange Show in San Bernardino. It was moved from its original location shortly before it began due to weather and access issues related to a recent nearby fire. The lineup included Aphex Twin, Sneaker Pimps, The Crystal Method, and Faithless; Prodigy and the Chemical Brothers withdrew their expected appearance at the festival. Fewer than 3000 tickets were sold.

== See also ==
- Coachella Valley Music and Arts Festival
- Insomniac Events
- Goldenvoice
