= Bellyache =

Bellyache may refer to:

- Abdominal pain
- Bellyache bush, a flowering plant native to Mexico, South America and the Caribbean islands
- Bellyache, an informal term for a complaint
- "Bellyache" (Echobelly song), 1993
- "Bellyache" (Billie Eilish song), 2017
