= Humanfolk =

World Music group

HUMANFOLK musicians
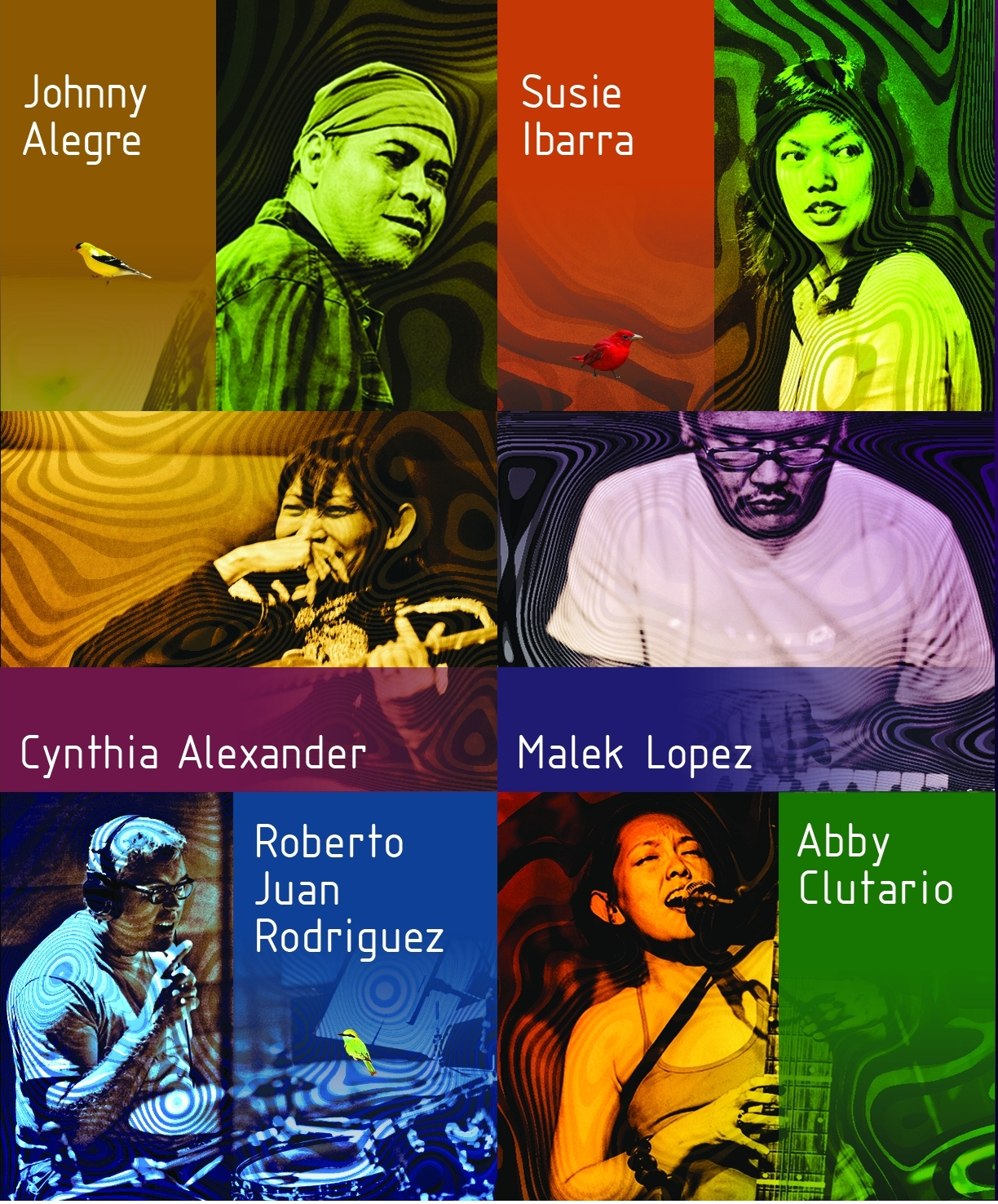

Background information
- Origin: Manila, Philippines
- Genres: World music, Urban folk
- Years active: 2008–present

HUMANFOLK began as a concept album of guitarist-composer Johnny Alegre with the multi-instrumentalist Cynthia Alexander and the electronica exponent Malek Lopez, along with visiting New York City–based participating artists; namely drummer Roberto Juan Rodriguez and percussionist Susie Ibarra. The pioneering effort marked the convergence in a contemporary Philippine setting of multiple musical idioms (jazz, rock, electronic music, kulintang, agung and indigenous percussion, with Iberian and folk music influences). The group's name is a deliberate conjoining of the words "human" and "folk", akin to "menfolk" and "womenfolk", without prejudice to gender and frequently set in all caps to distinguish it from a dictionary term, that evolved afterwards into a concept band.

== History ==
The group started as a studio project between jazz and world music musicians in the summer of 2008. The introduction of Alegre, Rodriguez and Ibarra at the United States Embassy in Manila spurred a series of musical and social interactions. The impetus culminated in recordings of a "Humanfolk Suite", a world music cycle composed by Alegre.

Towards October 2008, the threesome of Alegre, Alexander, and Lopez performed a live semi-improvised score for a short, silent film by Sasha Palomares, entitled Une Femme Andalouse, which was awarded the KODAK Best 16mm Experimental Film in that year by the Kodak Filmschool Competition. They were subsequently invited to perform at the 4th Philippine International Jazz & Arts Festival in February 2009, and a live collaborative performance with the Australian didgeridoo virtuoso William Barton in January 2010, that also introduced vocalist-keyboardist Abby Clutario as a new principal member of the group. These appearances and many others that followed led to the release by MCA Music (Universal Music Group) of Humanfolk's eponymous album in May 2011.

In 2012, Humanfolk was conferred an Awit Award for the song "Para Sa Tao", as Best World Music Recording by the Philippine Association of the Record Industry (PARI). Upon the exodus of two founding members, Cynthia Alexander (for the United States) and Malek Lopez (for Singapore), Alegre and Clutario continued as Humanfolk's principal members in a configuration described as Mark II, which was introduced in 2013 before international audiences in Singapore's Mosaic Music Festival and Malaysia's Kota Kinabalu Jazz Festival. In the Philippines, the group performed at the 2nd CCP International Jazz Festival in September 2013, and recorded the promotional EP, Ephipany. In January 2015, the group performed in India at the Saarang International Cultural Festival organized by IIT Madras. Towards the end of 2015, the group was joined by vocalist and rhythm guitarist Kris Gorra Dancel; and session percussionist Deej Rodriguez. This expanded group, described as Mark III, recorded the year-end extended play Naglalarong Ilaw, an independent release.

As a fitting counterpoint to HUMANFOLK's performance in November 2010 when they were launched at the Ayala Museum — the music of HUMANFOLK was once again presented in a 2-hour Ayala Museum retrospective concert in November 2023, entitled "Indigenous Legacies" hosted by the Filipinas Heritage Library.

== Personnel ==
=== Eponymous 1st album ===
- Johnny Alegre – guitars, bungkaka, piano, tambourine, vocals
- Cynthia Alexander – guitars, bass, agung, vocals, bungkaka, tongatong
- Malek Lopez – computer, sound design, keyboards
- Roberto Juan Rodriguez – drum kit, cajón, bongos
- Susie Ibarra – kulintang, kulintang a kayo, drum kit, vocals and handclaps
- Abby Clutario – vocals, keyboards, Chapman Stick

=== Mark II ===
- Johnny Alegre – guitars, percussion, vocals
- Abby Clutario – vocals, keyboards, Chapman Stick
- Yuna Reguerra (1) – bass
- Rodney Vidanes (2) – bass
- Paolo Manuel (1) – drums
- Zach Lucero (2) – drums

=== Mark III ===
- Johnny Alegre – guitars, percussion, vocals
- Kris Gorra Dancel – vocals, rhythm guitar,
- Abby Clutario – vocals, keyboards, Chapman Stick
- Rodney Vidanes – bass
- Zach Lucero – drums
- Malek Lopez – computer, sound design, keyboards
- Deej Rodriguez – percussion

=== Mark IV ===
- Johnny Alegre – guitars, percussion, vocals
- Kris Gorra Dancel – vocals, rhythm guitar,
- Abby Clutario – vocals, keyboards, Chapman Stick
- Tusa Montes – kulintang, sarunai, percussion

=== Mark V ===
- Johnny Alegre – guitars, percussion, vocals
- Abby Clutario – vocals, keyboards
- Tusa Montes – Maguindanao percussion
- Mlou Matute – Kalinga-Apayao percussion
- Yan Bagay Cruz – bass
- Paolo Manuel – drums
- Eric Tubon – electronic percussion

== Discography ==
Year	Title	Label	Type
2011	Humanfolk	MCA Universal	Studio album
2011	"Para sa Tao" (radio edit)	MCA Universal	Single
2014	Epiphany	Independently released	Extended play
2015	Naglalarong Ilaw	Independently released	Extended play

== Videography ==
Title	Musicians	Director	Producer	Category	Year	Country
Para Sa Tao	Abby Clutario, vocals, keyboards & Chapman Stick ♦ Johnny Alegre, acoustic guitar ♦ Cynthia Alexander, bass ♦ Malek Lopez, electronics	Daphne Oliveros	PH AFFINITY Productions	music video	2011	Philippines
Hexagram II	Abby Clutario, keyboards & vocals ♦ Johnny Alegre, guitars & percussion ♦ Rodney Vidanes, bass ♦ Zach Lucero, drums ♦ Frances Escapé, percussion	Perth Salva	PH AFFINITY Productions	live in the studio	2013	Philippines
Himig Ng Pasko	Abby Clutario, keyboards & vocals ♦ Johnny Alegre, guitars & percussion ♦ Rodney Vidanes, bass ♦ Zach Lucero, drums	JM Quiblat	PH AFFINITY Productions	music video	2014	Philippines
Naglalarong Ilaw	Kris Gorra Dancel, vocals & rhythm guitar ♦ Johnny Alegre, guitars ♦ Abby Clutario, keyboards & harmonies ♦ Rodney Vidanes, bass ♦ Zach Lucero, drums ♦ Deej Rodriguez, percussion	Phillip Miguel Luis & Lycylle Bianca Tse Cawaling	PH AFFINITY Productions	music video	2015	Philippines
Indiemand	Johnny Alegre, guitars ♦ Abby Clutario, keyboards & vocals ♦ Deej Rodriguez, percussion	Pamela Carbonell	The Filipino Channel	music video	2019	Philippines

== Awards ==
Year	Award giving body	Venue	Category	Nominated work	Results
2012	25th Awit Awards	Glorietta	Best World Music Recording	Para Sa Tao	Won
2012	25th Awit Awards	Glorietta	Best Jazz Recording	Para Sa Tao	Nominated
