= King of the Kerb =

1995 single by Echobelly

Single by Echobelly

from the album On
- Released: 23 October 1995
- Studio: Marcus
- Length: 3.59
- Label: Fauve, Rhythm King
- Songwriters: Sonya Madan, Glenn Johansson
- Producer: Echobelly

Echobelly singles chronology
"Great Things" (1995)	"King of the Kerb" (1995)	"Dark Therapy" (1996)

"King of the Kerb" is the second single from British rock band Echobelly's second album, On (1995). The song reached 25 on the UK Singles Chart and number 1 on the indie chart. "King of the Kerb" was included on both of the greatest hits albums that Echobelly have released: I Can't Imagine The World Without Me and The Best Of Echobelly. All the single's B-sides were included on the expanded edition of On.

== Track listings ==
UK CD 1

All tracks are written by Sonya Madan and Glen Johansson.

No.	Title	Length
1.	"King of the Kerb"	3:59
2.	"Car Fiction (acoustic/French version)"	2:33
3.	"On Turn On (acoustic version)"	3:18
4.	"Natural Animal (acoustic)"	3:44
Total length:		14:34

- All songs were produced by Echobelly and recorded at Marcus apart from "King of the Kerb", produced by Paul Kolderie and Sean Slade and recorded at Konk Studios and Fort Apache
- "Natural Animal" and "Car Fiction" were originally released on On

UK CD 2

No.	Title	Length
1.	"King of the Kerb"	4:29
2.	"Car Fiction" (acoustic/French version)	3:54
3.	"Insomniac"	4:01
4.	"Great Things"	3:31
Total length:		15:55

- All songs were recorded live at wetlands preserve
- "Insomniac" was originally released on Everyone's Got One
- "Great Things" was originally released on On

European CD

No.	Title	Length
1.	"King of the Kerb"	3:58
2.	"On Turn On" (acoustic)	3:18
3.	"Natural Animal" (acoustic)	3:43
4.	"Great Things" (live at wetlands preserve)	3:32
Total length:		14:31

Australian CD

No.	Title	Length
1.	"King of the Kerb"
2.	"On Turn On"
3.	"Natural Animals"
4.	"Great Things"
5.	"Car Fictions" (acoustic/French version)

Japanese CD

No.	Title	Length
1.	"King of the Kerb"	4:00
2.	"On Turn On" (acoustic)	3:19
3.	"Natural Animal" (acoustic)	3:14
4.	"We Know Better"	4:04
5.	"Atom"	2:50
6.	"Aloha Lolita"	3:14
Total length:		20:41

- "Atom" was included on the greatest hits compilation I Can't Imagine The World Without Me.

== Personnel ==
- Bass – Alexander Keyser
- Drums – Andy Henderson
- Guitar – Glenn Johansson
- Voice – Sonya Madan
- Engineer – Dick Meaney
- Cover Photography – Kevin Westenberg
- Producer – Echobelly
