= Lustra =

Lustra may refer to:

- Lustrum (plural "Lustra"), a period of five years
- Lustra, Campania, a commune in Salerno, Italy
- Lustra (album), a 1997 album by Echobelly
- Lustra (band), a pop punk band, with an eponymous album, known for the song "Scotty Doesn't Know" in the film EuroTrip
- Lustra, a 1916 poetry collection by Ezra Pound
