= Kali Yuga (song) =

Single by Echobelly

from the album People Are Expensive
- Released: 8 October 2001
- Genre: Britpop, Indie Rock, Rock
- Length: 3:34
- Label: Fry Up
- Songwriters: Sonya Madan, Glenn Johansson

Echobelly singles chronology
"Tell Me Why" (2001)	"Kali Yuga" (2001)

"Kali Yuga" is the third and final single of Echobelly's fourth album People Are Expensive. It reached 175 in the UK Singles Chart.

The 2 b-sides are re-recorded versions of the b-sides to Bellyache.

== Track listing ==
All tracks are written by Sonya Madan and Glen Johansson.

No.	Title	Length
1.	"Kali Yuga"	3:34
2.	"Sleeping Hitler"	4:27
3.	"I Don't Belong Here"	5:01
Total length:		13:02

== Credits ==
- Bass – James Harris
- Drums – Andy Henderson
- Guitar – Glenn Johansson
- Voice – Sonya Madan
- Track 1 recorded by Ben Hillier
- Track 2 recorded and mixed by James Laughry
- Track 3 recorded by – Dick Meaney
- Track 1 remixed by Charlie Francis & Nick Watts
- Mastered By Chris Parmenidis
