= Anarchy and Alchemy =

Studio album by Echobelly
- Released: 26 May 2017
- Genre: Rock, indie rock, alternative rock
- Length: 40:12
- Label: Fauve Music
- Producer: Ian Grimble

Echobelly chronology
The Best of Echobelly (2008)	Anarchy and Alchemy (2017)

Anarchy and Alchemy is the sixth studio album by English rock band Echobelly, and their first studio album since Gravity Pulls, released in 2004.

== Background and production ==
Following the release of Gravity Pulls, Ruth Owen (bass) and Andy Henderson (drums) left the band, and they decided to split up. However, in 2009, vocalist Sonya Madan and guitarist Glenn Johansson started performing again, under the name Calm of Zero. Under this name they recorded two acoustic EPs and performed a few concerts. Some of the songs recorded for the acoustic EPs would be re-recorded for Anarchy and Alchemy, "Reign On" and "Faces in the Mirror". Additionally, calm of zero had also released "Flesh 'N' Bones", "Molotov" and "Autumn Angel" via YouTube and as free downloads.

On 31 May 2016, Echobelly announced via Facebook that they had reformed and were recording a new album. A PledgeMusic campaign was created, allowing fans to purchase signed CD and vinyl copies of the album, as well as T-shirts and other items. Updates relating to the album's progress were also provided through PledgeMusic. Ian Grimble produced and mixed the album, before it was mastered by Frank Artkwight at Abbey Road Studios.

== Release ==
The album was released on 26 May 2017. Two songs were released to promote the album; "Anarchy and Alchemy" was released as a download for those who had purchased items through PledgeMusic, and a music video was posted to YouTube on 30 January 2017. A music video for "Hey Hey Hey" was also released to support the album. Echobelly will tour the UK through May and June 2017, playing concerts in Cardiff, Birmingham, Norwich, Sheffield, York and London.

== Track listing ==
All songs written by Sonya Madan and Glenn Johansson.

1. "Hey Hey Hey" – 3:59
2. "Firefly" – 4:59
3. "Anarchy and Alchemy" – 4:10
4. "Reign On" – 4:09
5. "Flesh 'n' Bones" – 3:53
6. "If the Dogs Don't Get You, My Sisters Will" – 3:42
7. "Faces in the Mirror" – 3:50
8. "Molotov" – 3:44
9. "Autumn Angel" – 3:50
10. "Dead Again" – 3:55

== Personnel ==
Personnel per sleeve.

Echobelly

- Sonya Madan – vocals, backing vocals percussion
- Glenn Johansson – guitar, percussion, keyboards, backing vocals
- Oliver McKiernan – bass, percussion, keyboards, programming
- Ash Hall – drums, percussion

Production and design

- Ian Grimble – producer, mixing
- Frank Arkwright – mastering
- Richard May – illustrations, front cover design
- Robert Newman – graphic design
