= Ako'y may alaga =

"Ako'y may alaga" (transl. "I have a pet"; occasionally referred to as "Asong mataba" or "Ang aking alaga") is a Filipino poem in the Tagalog language of unknown authorship taught in elementary schools across the Philippines, typically in Kindergarten and grade 1. While many different versions exist, most versions are similar to the following:

Ako'y may alaga,
Asong mataba.
Buntot ay mahaba,
Makinis ang mukha.

Mahal niya ako,
Mahal ko rin siya.
Kaya kaming dalawa,
Ay laging magkasama.

I have a pet,
A fat dog.
Long is his (Note: The Tagalog language uses gender-neutral third person pronouns. That is to say, "his", "her" and "its" are all represented by the same word, in this case siya. Thus the poem leaves the dog's gender ambiguous.) tail,
smooth is his face.

I love him,
and he loves me.
That's why the two of us
are always together.

Owing to the poem's popularity in the country, the pinoy rock band Siakol recorded a song to an expanded version of the poem in their 1996 album, Tayo Na Sa Paraiso. Poems based on the original, written by Filipino elementary school students, can be found in professional journals from as early as 1977.
