= Close... But =

1994 single by Echobelly

Single by Echobelly

from the album Everyone's Got One
- Released: 24 October 1994
- Length: 2:56
- Label: Fauve, Rhythm King
- Songwriters: Sonya Madan, Glenn Johansson
- Producer: Steven Street

Echobelly singles chronology
"I Can't Imagine the World Without Me" (1994)	"Close... But" (1994)	"Great Things" (1995)

"Close... But" is the fourth and final single from Echobelly's 1994 debut album, Everyone's Got One. It was released in October 1994. The song was included on the greatest hits album I Can't Imagine The World Without Me. The song was poorly received by AllMusic, who gave it 1.5 stars out of 5, and described it as "not one of the album's high points". It reached number 59 in the UK Singles Chart. A music video was made for the song.

== Track listing ==
All tracks are written by Sonya Madan and Glen Johansson.

No.	Title	Length
1.	"Close... But"	3:00
2.	"So La Di Da"	4:44
3.	"I Can't Imagine The World Without Me (live)"	3:24
4.	"Cold Feet Warm Heart (live)"	3:39
Total length:		14:47

=== Notes ===
- Tracks 3 and 4 were recorded live on the Steve Lamacq Evening Session broadcast on 5 September 1994
- Tracks 2, 3 and 4 were re-released on the expanded edition of Everyone's Got One in 2014
- The 7-inch vinyl version only features tracks 1 and 2 (1 as the A-side, 2 as the B-side)
- The 12-inch vinyl version features tracks 1 and 2 on the A-side and tracks 3 and 4 on the B-side
- The 12-inch vinyl version comes with a poster, badge and sticker

== Credits ==
- Bass – Alexander Keyser
- Drums – Andy Henderson
- Guitar – Glenn Johansson, Debbie Smith
- Voice – Sonya Madan
- Saxophones (on track 1) – The Kick Horns
- Engineer – Miti Adhikari
- Track 1 Producer – Steven Street
- Track 2 Producer – Simon Vinestock
- Track 3 & 4 Producer – Sam Cunningham
- Cover photographer – Chris Craske
