= 25th Awit Awards =

2012 Philippine music awards ceremony

- Date: November 27, 2012
- Location: Glorietta, Ayala Center, Makati
- Hosted by: Denise Laurel; Krista Kleiner; Anthony Semerad; David Semerad

Highlights
- Most awards: Jonathan Ong (3)
- Most nominations: Jonathan Ong (7)
- Album of the Year: Panaginip by Noel Cabangon
- Song of the Year: "Ako na Lang" by Jungee Marcelo

Television/radio coverage
- Produced by: ALV Events International

The 25th Awit Awards were held on November 27, 2012, at the Glorietta located in Ayala Center, Makati. They gave excellence to the best of Filipino music for the year 2011.

Jonathan Ong led the nominations with seven. He was followed by Noel Cabangon, Ebe Dancel and Jonathan Manalo, each receiving five nominations.

The awards ceremony was hosted by Denise Laurel, Krista Kleiner and the twins Anthony and David Semerad. Jonathan Ong took home most of the awards with three. Special citation was given to Jose Mari Chan for being the first Filipino artist to receive a tribute album created by foreign artists. The album was known as The Manhattan Connection, The Songs of Jose Mari Chan by the American vocal group, The Manhattan Transfer. Special citations were also given to Ronnie Ricketts, the Optical Media Board chairman and James Dy for their campaign against piracy.

== Winners and nominees ==
Winners are listed first and highlighted in bold. Nominated producers, composers and lyricists are not included in this list, unless noted. For the full list, please go to their official website.

=== Performance Awards ===
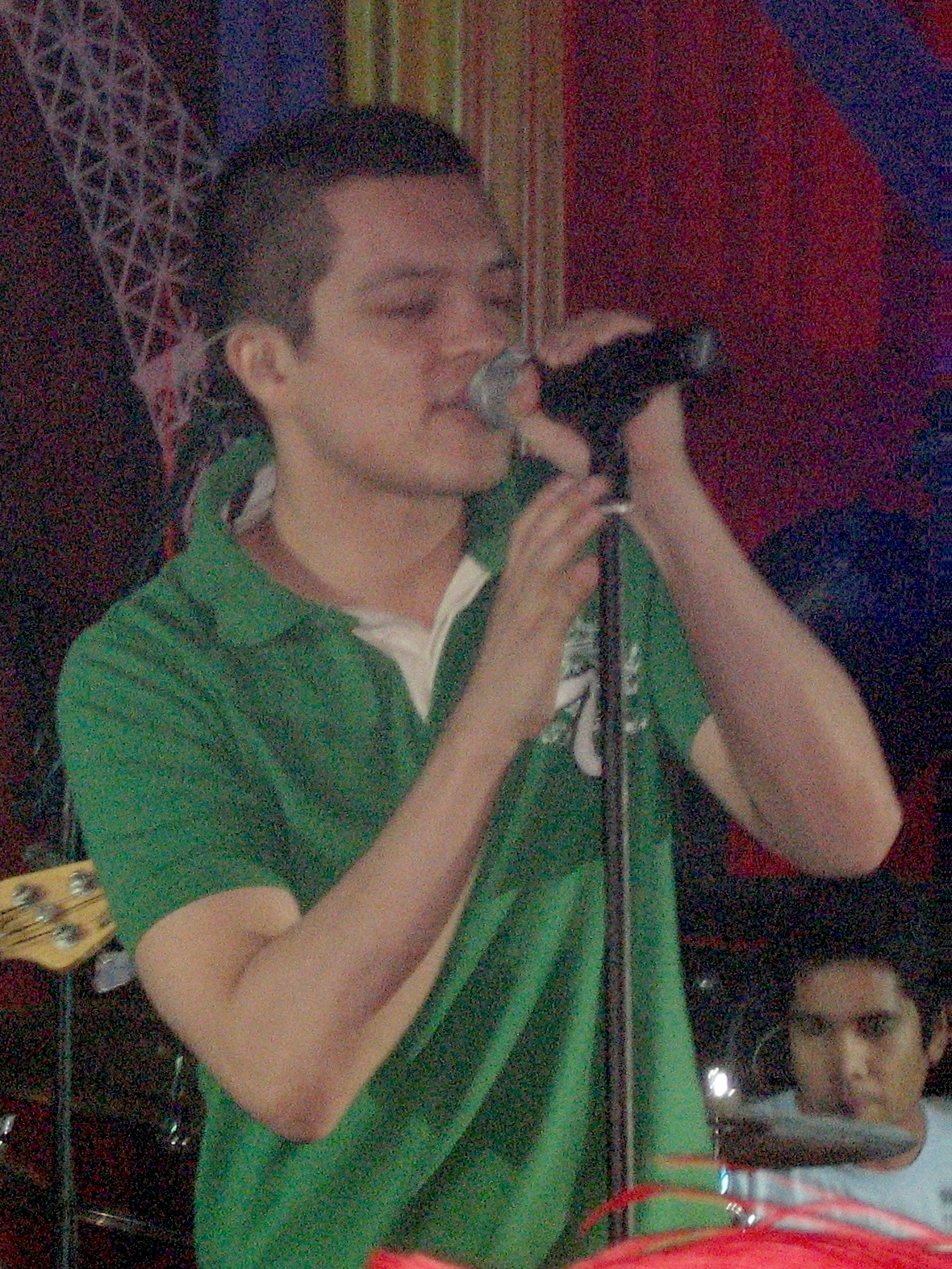
Bamboo Mañalac, Best Male winner

Best Performance by a Female Recording Artist	Best Performance by a Male Recording Artist
**"Ako na Lang" – Zia Quizon**; "Tubig" – Tricia Garcia; "Kahit Di Mo Sabihin" – Juris; "Patuloy ang Pangarap" (Alternate Version) – Angeline Quinto; "Sino'ng Mag-aakala" – Sitti	**"Questions" – Bamboo Mañalac**; "I'm Already King" – Christian Bautista; "Kahit Walang Sabihin" – Rico Blanco; "Panaginip" – Noel Cabangon; "Sapagkat ang Diyos ay Pag-ibig" – Erik Santos; "Minsan Lang Kita Iibigin" – Gary Valenciano
Best Performance by a Group Recording Artists	Best Performance by a New Female Recording Artist
**"Ulap" – Voyz Avenue/Takeoff**; "Love I've Found in You" – Ateneo Chamber Singers; "Save Me" – Letter Day Story; "Ngayon Na" – Slapshock; "Tambay" – Sponge Cola	**"Ako na Lang" – Zia Quizon**; "Born This Way" – Maria Aragon; "Tubig" – Tricia Garcia; "Fire" – Solenn Heussaff; "Patuloy ang Pangarap" (Alternate Version) – Angeline Quinto
Best Performance by a New Male Recording Artist	Best Performance by a New Group Recording Artists
**"Ligaw" – Ney Dimaculangan**; "Paalam Kahapon" – Ebe Dancel; "Carried Away" – JM De Guzman; "Questions" – Bamboo Mañalac; "Hey Daydreamer" – Somedaydream	**"Kiss (Never Let Me Go)" – Thyro & Yumi**; "PiNK (Pag-ibig na Kaya?)" – 1:43; "Tanong Lang" – Ajka; "Sundo" – Opera Belles; "Youy!" – Q-York
Best Performance by a Child/Children Recording Artist/s	Best Collaboration
**"Born This Way" – Maria Aragon**; "Christmas Prayer" – Athan Deandre Jaime	**"Walang Natira" – Gloc-9 feat. Sheng Belmonte**; "Wish" – Anton Alvarez feat. Sarah Geronimo; "Ikaw na Sana" – Noel Cabangon feat. Nina; "Give Love on Christmas Day" – Bugoy Drilon & Liezel Garcia; "Ako'y Sa'yo at Ika'y Akin" – Sitti feat. Jek Manuel

=== Creativity Awards ===
Album of the Year	Song of the Year
**Panaginip – Noel Cabangon**; One Heart – Sarah Geronimo; Juris Forevermore – Juris; Araw Oras Tagpuan – Sponge Cola	**"Ako na Lang"** **Jungee Marcelo (composer & lyricist)**; "Hey Daydreamer" Rez Toledo (composer & lyricist); "Hindi Kita Iiwan" Jonathan Manalo (composer & lyricist); "Tambay" Yael Yuzon (composer) Reynaldo Dilay (lyricist); "Walang Natira" Aristotle Pollisco (composer & lyricist)
Best Selling Album of the Year	Best Ballad Recording
**One Heart – Sarah Geronimo**	**"Hindi Kita Iiwan" – Sam Milby**; "Paalam Kahapon" (Acoustic Version) – Ebe Dancel; "Sino Nga Ba Siya" – Sarah Geronimo; "Masasabi Mo Ba" – Rachelle Ann Go; "Sino'ng Mag-aakala" – Sitti
Best Rock/Alternative Recording	Best World Music Recording
**"Save Me" – Letter Day Story**; "Ngayon" – Rico Blanco; "Muli" – Ebe Dancel; "Kay Tagal Kitang Hinintay" – Sponge Cola; "Sending a Message" – Urbandub	**"Para sa Tao" – HUMANFOLK**; "Bulag Pipi Bingi" – Noel Cabangon; "Tubig" – Tricia Garcia; "Simple Girl" – Zia Quizon; "Pogi (Hindi Lahat)" – Superkendi
Best Novelty Recording	Best Dance Recording
**"Nananana" – John Estrada, Rico J. Puno & Randy Santiago**; "Mahal Kita Kasi" – Toni Gonzaga; "No Boypren, No Problem" – Pokwang; "Pogi (Hindi Lahat)" – Superkendi	**"Connection" – Chelo A. feat. JayR & Q-York**; "I-Swing Mo" – John Estrada, Rico J. Puno & Randy Santiago; "Ladies Night" – Solenn Heussaff; "OMG" – Karylle
Best Inspirational/Religious Recording	Best Christmas Recording
**"Sino Ako" – Fatima Soriano**; "Sing Forever/ Magsiawit Magpakailanman" – Bukas Palad; "Enrich the Spirit" – Almira Cercado, Frenchie Dy, Bituin Escalante, Roselle Nava, Daniel Razon, Gerald Santos & Jinky Vidal; "Patuloy ang Pangarap" (Alternate Version) – Angeline Quinto; "Sapagkat ang Diyos ay Pag-ibig" – Erik Santos	**"Pasko ng Pagbibigayan" – Noel Cabangon**; "Merry Christmas Na" – 1:43; "Da Best ang Pasko ng Pilipino" – Maria Aragon feat. University of the Philippines Concert Chorus; "More Than Just a Merry Christmas" – Reuben Laurente; "Ngayong Pasko" – Angeline Quinto
Best Rap Recording	Best Jazz Recording
**"Walang Natira" – Gloc 9 feat. Sheng Belmonte**; "Dengue" – Khen Magat; "Youy!" – Q-York	**"Sa Iyo Lang" – Tricia Garcia**; "Tanong Lang" – Ajka; "Para sa Tao" – HUMANFOLK; "End It with You" – Sitti
Best R&B Recording	Best Song Written for Movie/TV/Stage Play
**"Kiss (Never Let Me Go)" – Thyro & Yumi**	**"Sabay Tayo" (from The Biggest Loser Pinoy Edition) – Mayonnaise**; "Ikaw Lamang" (from Nasaan Ka, Elisa?) – Martin Nievera; "Kahit na Malayo Ka" (from Noah) – Piolo Pascual

=== Technical Achievement Awards ===
Best Musical Arrangement	Best Vocal Arrangement
**"Tuloy na Tuloy pa Rin ang Pasko" – Albert Tamayo**; "Don't Say Goodbye" – Arnold Buena; "Isang Probinsyano sa Maynila" – Ebe Dancel; "Sa Piling Mo" – Ruth Rocabo-Bagalay; "Where Do I Begin (Love Story)" – Gerard Salonga; "Enrich the Spirit" – Bobby Velasco	**"O Holy Night" – JayR**; "Enrich the Spirit" – Edwin Marollano; "Tuloy na Tuloy pa Rin ang Pasko" – Edwin Marollano; "Luha" (Acoustic Version) – Arnie Mendaros; "(You Make Me Feel Like) A Natural Woman" – Arnie Mendaros & Ito Rapadas
Best Engineered Recording	Best Album Package
**"Simple Girl" – Nikki Cunanan**; "(You Make Me Feel Like) A Natural Woman" – Gil Loseñada & Willy Villa; "Walang Natira" – Jonathan Ong; "Hindi Kita Iiwan" – Dante Tanedo; "20/20" – Pat Tirano; "Panaginip" – Willy Villa	**Kinse Kalibre** **Team Manila Graphic Design Studio (graphic design & album concept)** **Xander Angeles (photography)**; Breathe Again Idee Kreativ (graphic design) Idee Kreativ & Jed Madela (album concept) Xander Angeles (photography); No Water, No Moon Willie Monzon (graphic design & album concept) Mark Nicdao (photography); Stay Alive Idee Kreativ (graphic design) King Girado & Idee Kreativ (album concept) Pat Dy (photography); Zia Willie Monzon (graphic design & album concept) Raymund Isaac (photography)
Music Video of the Year
**"20/20" – Pupil** **Jayson Tan (director)**; "Pinays Rise" – Chelo A. Treb Monteras II (director); "Kahit Walang Sabihin" – Rico Blanco Richard Somes (director); "Muli" – Ebe Dancel Treb Monteras II (director); "Walang Natira" – Gloc-9 feat. Sheng Belmonte Jay Pacena II (director)

=== Digital Awards ===
ABS-CBN Interactive's Most Downloaded Song for 2011	ABS-CBN Interactive's Most Downloaded Artist for 2011
**"Hey Daydreamer" – Rez Toledo**^{[A]}	**Somedaydream**
I-Gateway Mobile Philippines Inc.'s Most Downloaded Song for 2011	I-Gateway Mobile Philippines Inc.'s Most Downloaded Artist for 2011
**"Nang Dahil sa Pag-ibig" – Larry Hermoso**^{[A]}	**Sabrina**
EGG's AllHits.ph Most Downloaded Song for 2011	EGG's AllHits.ph Most Downloaded Artist for 2011
**"Sino Nga Ba Siya" – Vehnee Saturno**^{[A]}	**Sarah Geronimo**

Note:

^[A]The awards were given specifically to the composers, instead of the recording artists/groups.

=== Special awards ===
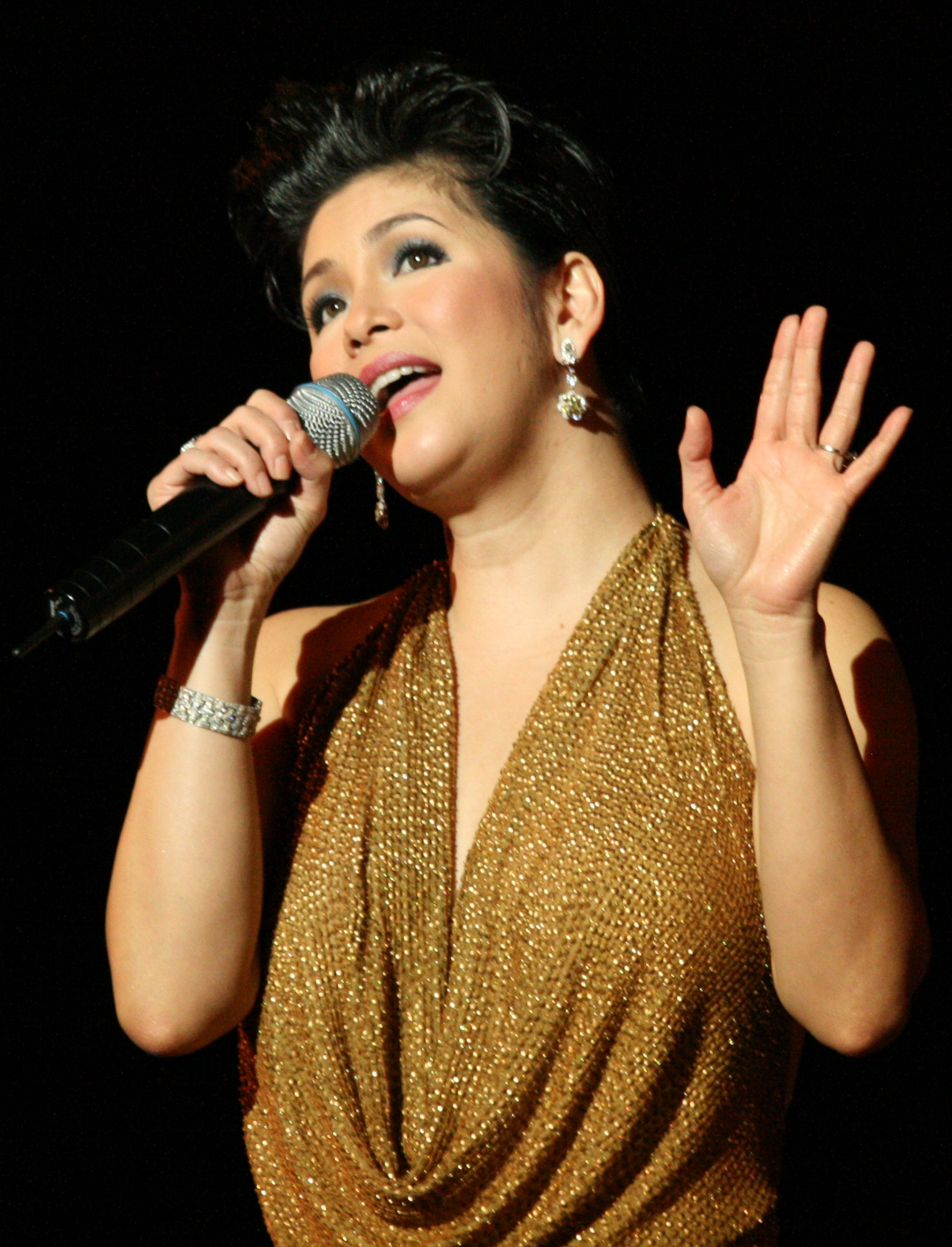
Regine Velasquez-Alcasid

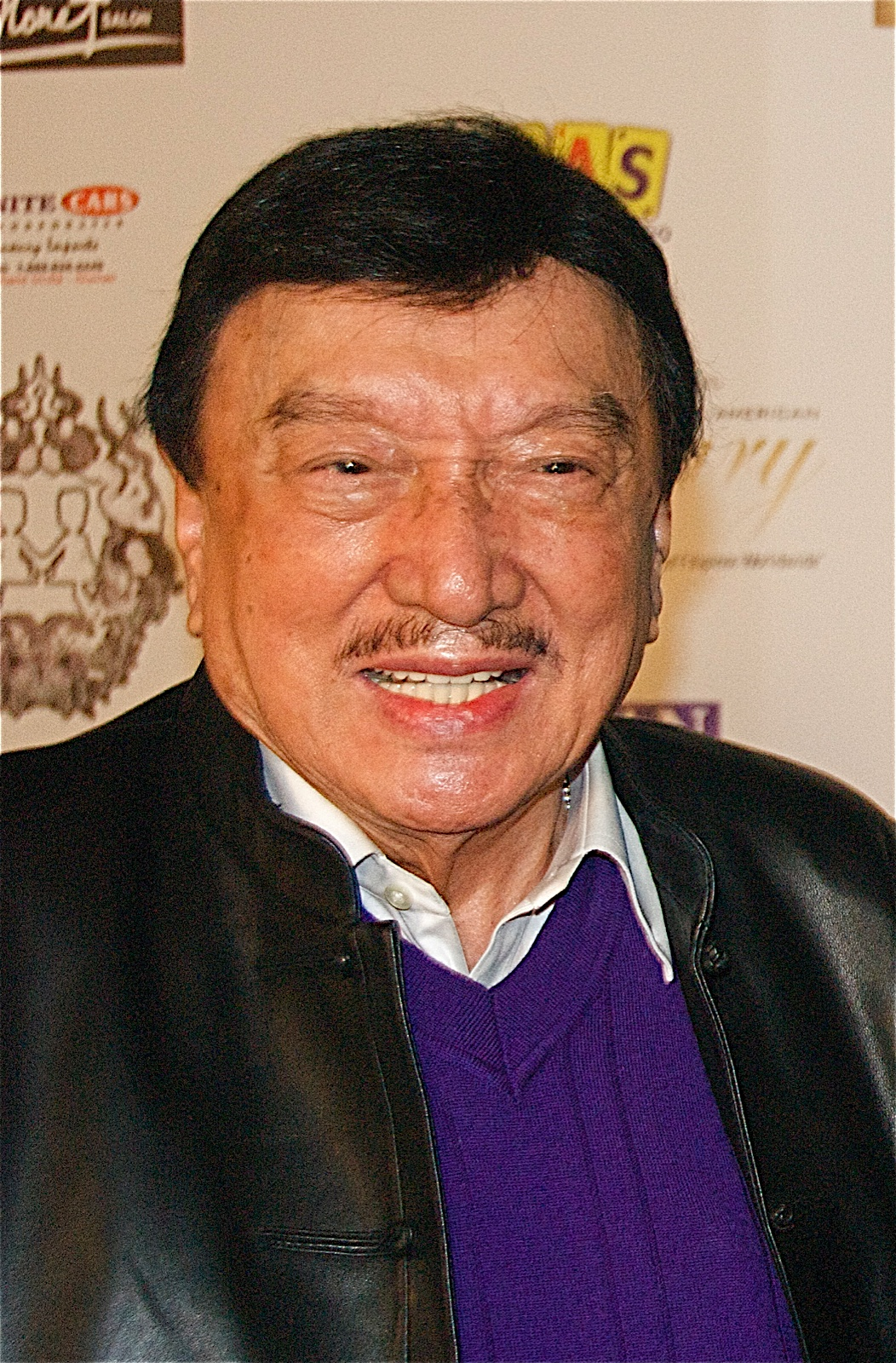
Dolphy

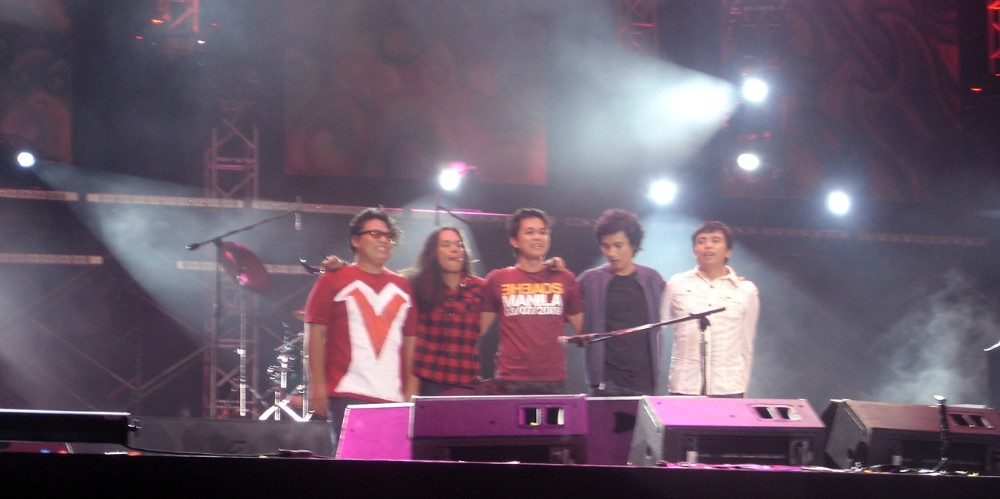
Eraserheads

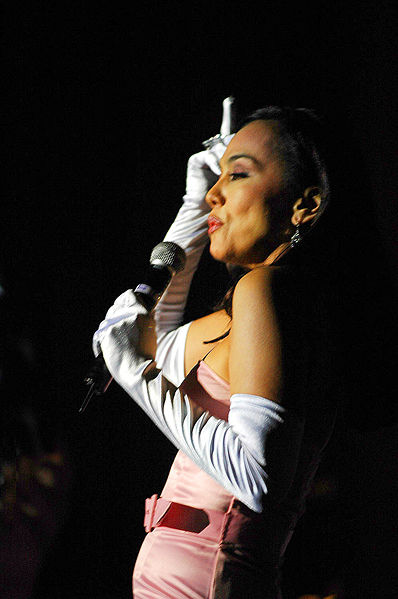
Kuh Ledesma

Dangal ng Musikang Pilipino awardees

Special Citation	Dangal ng Musikang Pilipino Award
**Jose Mari Chan**; **James Dy**; **Ronnie Ricketts**	**Regine Velasquez-Alcasid**; **Dolphy**; **Eraserheads**; **Gary Granada**; **Kuh Ledesma**

== Performers ==
This is in alphabetical order.

Artist(s)	Song(s)
Callalily	"Pasasalamat"
The Company	"Kanlungan" (Noel Cabangon cover)
Ebe Dancel	"Maligalig"
Isabella de Leon	"Feelingero"
Gloc-9; Ebe Dancel	"Sirena"
Bamboo Mañalac	"In This Life"
Luke Mejares	"Babaero" (Randy Santiago cover)
Moonstar88	
Richard Poon	"I'll Take Care of You"
Zia Quizon	"Ako na Lang"
Erik Santos	"Pangarap Ko ang Ibigin Ka" (Regine Velasquez-Alcasid cover)
Zendee Rose Tenerefe	
Bryan Termulo	
Gary Valenciano	
Young JV	"She Ain't You" intro (Chris Brown cover) "Your Name"
