= Here Comes the Big Rush =

"Here Comes The Big Rush"

Single by Echobelly

from the album Lustra
- Released: October 1997
- Genre: Rock, indie rock, electronic
- Length: 4:25
- Label: Epic Records
- Songwriters: Sonya Madan, Glenn Johansson
- Producer: Gil Norton

Echobelly singles chronology
"The World Is Flat" (1997)	"Here Comes The Big Rush" (1997)	"Digit" (2001)

"Here Comes The Big Rush" is the second and final single from Echobelly's third album Lustra. It was released by the Britpop group in October 1997.

The song was included on the greatest hits album I Can't Imagine The World Without Me.

A music video was made for the song.

It reached number 56 in the UK Singles Chart.

== Track listing ==
=== UK CD 1 ===
All tracks are written by Sonya Madan and Glen Johansson.

No.	Title	Length
1.	"Here Comes The Big Rush"	4:25
2.	"Here Comes The Big Rush (Dave Angel Vocal Remix)"	6:07
3.	"Here Comes The Big Rush (Dave Angel Instrumental)"	6:07
4.	"Here Comes The Big Rush (Midfield General Vocal Remix)"	5:50
5.	"Here Comes The Big Rush (Midfield General Dub)"	5:50
Total length:		28:19

=== UK CD 2 ===
All tracks are written by Sonya Madan and Glen Johansson.

No.	Title	Length
1.	"Here Comes The Big Rush"	4:25
2.	"Tesh"	3:44
3.	"Here Comes The Big Rush (Dave Angel Vocal Remix)"	6:05
4.	"Here Comes The Big Rush (Midfield General Vocal Remix)"	5:48
Total length:		20:02

=== UK CD 3 ===
All tracks are written by Sonya Madan and Glen Johansson.

No.	Title	Length
1.	"Here Comes The Big Rush"	4:26
2.	"Tesh"	3:44
3.	"Mouth Almighty"	3:59
Total length:		12:09

=== UK promo CD ===
All tracks are written by Sonya Madan and Glen Johansson.

No.	Title	Length
1.	"Here Comes The Big Rush (Edit)"

=== 12" promo vinyl ===
All tracks are written by Sonya Madan and Glen Johansson.

No.	Title	Length
1.	"Here Comes The Big Rush (Dave Angel Vocal Remix)"
2.	"Here Comes The Big Rush (Dave Angel Instrumental)"
3.	"Here Comes The Big Rush (Midfield General Vocal Remix)"
4.	"Here Comes The Big Rush (Midfield General Dub)"

- Tracks 1 & 2 appear on the a-side, tracks 3 & 4 appear on the b-side.

== Personnel ==
- Bass – James Harris
- Drums – Andy Henderson
- Guitar – Glenn Johansson
- Voice – Sonya Madan
- Engineer – Niven Garland, Roy Spong
- Producer - Gil Norton, Echobelly
