= Rubber Inc =

Electronic music duo from the Philippines

- Origin: Philippines
- Genres: Electronic
- Years active: 1998-present
- Members: Malek Lopez; Noel De Brackinghe

Rubber Inc is an electronic music duo from the Philippines and considered as intelligent dance musicians. The band is composed of Malek Lopez and Noel De Brackinghe, and was formed in 1998. They are the pioneers of live electronic dance music in the Philippines. They have been performing in the Philippine music scene as well as international events like the c/o pop music festival in Cologne, Germany in 2007. They had collaborations with Ballet Philippines, Philippine Philharmonic Orchestra, and brothers Andi and Hannes Teichmann who are DJs based in Berlin.

De Brakinghe is the owner of Sweetspot recording studio and through the studio he produces music for film and Filipino artists. He is also known individually as DJ Salamangkero while Malek is associated with other acts such as Drip and HUMANFOLK.
