= I Can't Imagine the World Without Me (song) =

1994 single by Echobelly

Single by Echobelly

from the album Everyone's Got One
- Released: June 1994
- Genre: Britpop
- Length: 3:02
- Label: Fauve, Rhythm King
- Songwriters: Sonya Madan, Glenn Johansson

Echobelly singles chronology
| "Insomniac" (1994) | "I Can't Imagine the World Without Me" (1994) | "Close… But" (1994) |

"I Can't Imagine the World Without Me" is the third single from English rock band Echobelly's debut album, Everyone's Got One. It was released as a single on 20 June 1994. The song is about Sonya Madan's self-confidence, hence the name. It reached 39 in the UK Singles Chart. The song was included on both of the greatest hits albums that Echobelly have released: I Can't Imagine the World Without Me and The Best of Echobelly. The B-sides were re-released on the expanded version of Everyone's Got One.

== Music video ==
The music video predominantly features the band playing in a field, whilst trying to show Sonya Madan's self-confidence and ego.

== Track listing ==
All tracks are written by Sonya Madan and Glen Johansson.

| No. | Title | Length |
|---|---|---|
| 1. | "I Can't Imagine The World Without Me" | 3:02 |
| 2. | "Sober" | 5:29 |
| 3. | "Venus Wheel" | 3:12 |
| Total length: | | 11:43 |

=== Notes ===
- The promo version only contains track 1
- The 7" vinyl version only features tracks 1 & 2 (1 as the A-side, 2 as the B-side)
- The 12" vinyl version features track 1 as the A-side and tracks 2 & 3 on the B-side.

== Credits ==
- Bass & Whistle – Alexander Keyser
- Drums – Andy Henderson
- Guitar – Glenn Johansson, Debbie Smith
- Voice – Sonya Madan
- Piano (tracks 1 & 2) & Orchestral Arranger - Lino Robinson
- Trumpet (track 1) - Barbara Snow
- Engineer (besides track 2)– Dick Meaney
- Cover Photography – Ray Burmiston
- Producer – Echobelly
- Track 1 Mixer - Alan Moulder
- Track 2 Mixer and Engineer - Nick Addison
- Track 3 Mixer - Dick Meaney
