= Echobelly =

English rock band

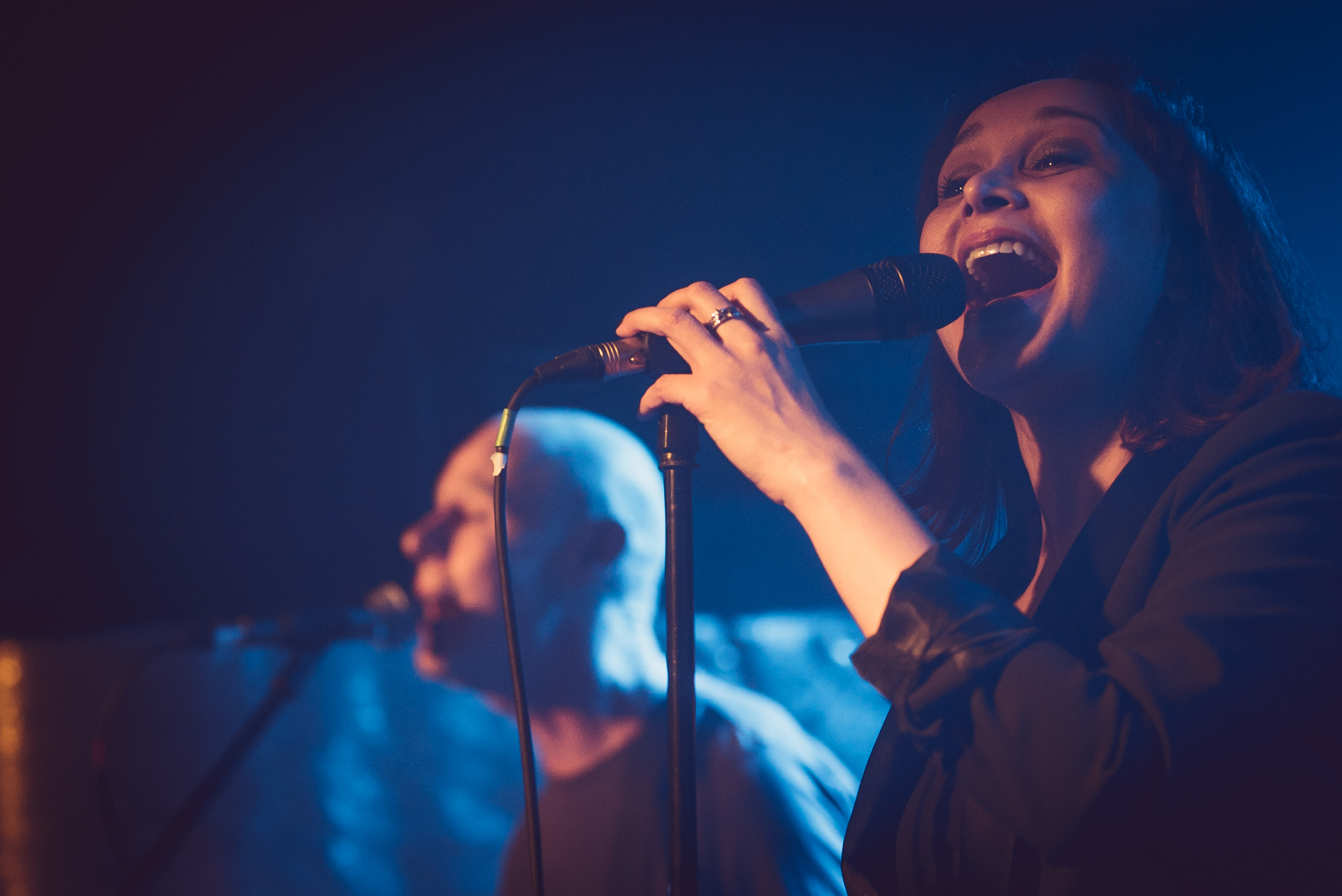
- Echobelly performing in January 2017

Background information
- Origin: London, England
- Genres: Rock; Britpop
- Years active: 1992–2004, 2009–present
- Labels: Fauve, Epic, Fry Up
- Members: Glenn Johansson; Sonya Madan
- Past members: James Harris; Andy Henderson; Alex Keyser; Debbie Smith
- Website: www.echobelly.com

Echobelly are an English rock band, debuting in 1994 with their album Everyone's Got One. They were often compared to Blondie and the Smiths, with Morrissey becoming a fan of the group.

== Career ==
Echobelly lead singer Sonya Madan was born in Delhi, India, before moving to England at the age of two.

In 1992, Madan and Johansson first met in a pub, with Sonya expressing her desire to sing in a band: "I used to sing to myself as a child. I suppose I had a secret desire to sing." They soon teamed up with bass guitarist Alex Keyser and drummer Andy Henderson, who had previously played with PJ Harvey's band. Guitarist Debbie Smith, formerly of Curve, came on board in 1994. According to the Epic Records' website, the group came up with the name Echobelly from the notion of "being hungry for something". With Madan and Johansson as the band's songwriters, they recorded their debut EP, Bellyache, on the independent Pandemonium label in late 1993.

The favourable response to Bellyache helped Echobelly secure a recording contract with Rhythm King, which was then part of Epic. Once on board the label, the group released the "I Can't Imagine the World Without Me" single in June 1994. The group then recorded the album Everyone's Got One, which included the single "Insomniac" and reached number eight on the UK Albums Chart. The single was featured in the film and soundtrack of Dumb and Dumber.

As their music received more airplay, Echobelly won admiration from other artists as well. Madonna expressed interest in putting them on her Maverick label (existing contractual arrangements prevented that), and R.E.M. requested the group as the opening act for their upcoming tour. The band returned to the studio in 1995 to create their next album, On, produced by Sean Slade and Paul Kolderie, who had also produced Hole and Radiohead.

Madan's lyrics often ventured into the less explored side of life, addressed in songs such as "King of the Kerb". and "Dark Therapy". "I wanted to challenge myself as a lyricist on a different level on this album," Madan said in Rolling Stone. "I want people to tell me what they thought the lyrics are about. I'm not a politician. I'm not interested in changing everybody around me. I'm interested in myself."

While many of the songs lamented the state of things, others on the On album celebrated the endless possibilities of the human spirit. In "Great Things", Madan sang "I want to do great things / I don't want to compromise / I want to know what love is / I want to know everything." The album's mostly optimistic feel provides an intriguing contrast with its serious subject matter. As Pareles wrote, "Both music and lyrics examine the tension between order and liberty". Listeners in the UK responded favourably to the album, driving three singles from the release into the top 30 of the UK Singles Chart. Sales of the album rose to over 150,000 in the UK, nearly double that of Everyone's Got One.

Health and legal problems interrupted the success of Echobelly in 1995 and 1996. Madan had a serious thyroid problem during her world tour that was potentially life-threatening, but was later cured. Bass guitarist James Harris joined after Keyser defected because of personal and artistic differences. The group also had disagreements with Rhythm King after the label moved to Arista. The band chose to stay with Epic. In 1996, Madan also ventured away from the group when she sang on a recording of the club band, Lithium. Smith left the band before the release of the band's third album Lustra, which was produced by Gil Norton and issued in November 1997. A single from the album, "The World is Flat", was released in August of that year.

A four-year hiatus was brought to an end in 2001 when the band returned with the Digit EP and their fourth album, People Are Expensive (produced by Ben Hillier), which were released on their own Fry Up label. Two further singles, "Tell Me Why" and "Kali Yuga" (a remixed version of the album track) followed.

In 2004, Echobelly released a fifth album, again through their own Fry Up label, Gravity Pulls (produced by Ian Grimble).

=== 2009 acoustic show and future ===
Madan and Johansson performed an acoustic show in July 2009, featuring new songs and older Echobelly tracks, at MoHo Live in Manchester. New material was demoed during this show which turned out to be part of two mini-albums that had already commenced recording under the alternative name Calm Of Zero, with new drummer Alex Reeves. Acoustic Sessions 1 was released in January 2011 and Acoustic Sessions 2 in October 2012. Another song, "Molotov", became available for playback on Echobelly's official Myspace page during January.

British independent record label 3 Loop Music released two-CD expanded editions of Everyone's Got One and On albums in July 2014. The re-releases included b-sides, live recordings, radio session tracks and unreleased material. In October 2015, the band made their live return, playing a sell-out gig at the Scala in London. Their sixth studio album, Anarchy and Alchemy, was released in May 2017, and a compilation, Black Heart Lullabies followed in 2018.

== Band members ==
- Sonya Aurora Madan – vocals, guitar (1992-2004, 2009-present)
- Glenn Johansson – guitar, backing vocals

Past members

- Andy Henderson – drums, percussion
- Alex Keyser – bass, piano
- Debbie Smith – guitar
- James Harris – bass

Additional musicians

- Ruth Owen – bass
- Julian Cooper
- Oliver McKiernan – bass
- Ash Hall – drums

== Discography ==
=== Albums ===
- Everyone's Got One (1994)
- On (1995)
- Lustra (1997)
- People Are Expensive (2001)
- Gravity Pulls (2004)
- Anarchy and Alchemy (2017)

=== Compilation albums ===
- I Can't Imagine the World Without Me (2001)
- The Best of Echobelly (2008)
- Black Heart Lullabies (2018)

=== Singles ===
- "Bellyache" (November 1993)
- "Insomniac" (March 1994) UK No. 47
- "I Can't Imagine the World Without Me" (June 1994) UK No. 39
- "Close… But" (October 1994) UK No. 59
- "Great Things" (August 1995) UK No. 13
- "King of the Kerb" (October 1995) UK No. 25
- "Dark Therapy" (February 1996) UK No. 20
- "The World Is Flat" (August 1997) UK No. 31
- "Here Comes the Big Rush" (October 1997) UK No. 56
- "Digit" (January 2001)
- "Tell Me Why" (May 2001) UK No. 111
- "Kali Yuga" (October 2001) UK No. 175
