= One Heart (Sarah Geronimo album) =

Studio album by Sarah Geronimo
- Released: May 13, 2011
- Recorded: 2010–2011
- Genre: Pop
- Length: 60:55
- Language: English; Tagalog; Filipino
- Label: VIVA
- Producer: Vicente Del Rosario

Sarah Geronimo chronology
Music and Me (2009)	One Heart (2011)	Pure OPM Classics (2012)

Singles from One Heart
- 1. "Sino Nga Ba Siya" Released: December 2010; 2. "Kung Siya ang Mahal" Released: May 2011; 3. "Bakit Pa Ba" Released: August 2011/January 2012

One Heart is the eighth studio album by Filipino singer Sarah Geronimo, released in the Philippines on May 13, 2011, by Viva Records. The album consists mainly of original songs and cover songs of OPM classics.

In 2011, Geronimo won the "Best Female Recording Artist" on the Box Office Entertainment Awards.

In 2012, it received the 'Best Selling Album of the Year' and 'Most Downloaded Song' for "Sino Nga Ba Siya" in the 25th Awit Awards.

== Singles ==
The first single was entitled "Sino Nga Ba Siya" and was released in December 2010. It became a teaser to the album that features sentimental tracks, generally about heartaches.

"Kung Siya Ang Mahal" was released in May 2011 as the second commercial single from the album.

"Bakit Pa Ba" was released in August 2011 as the third commercial single from the album. The song was originally recorded by Jay R in 2003, but the lyrics were changed as it speaks of what happened to the ex-lover.

== Critical reception ==
- Baby A. Gil of The Philippine Star was impressed with the original Filipino compositions, stating "It truly gladdens the heart that, Sarah, who is one of the country’s top hitmakers today has gone back, not only to Saturno songs but to other original Filipino compositions as well."
- Nickie Wang of Manila Standard Today noticed Geronimo's improvement, saying "Though Sarah is sending different messages from what the new album really speaks of, one fact is undeniable; she is mending a broken heart and it’s evident on how she rendered the songs in the album. Apparently, Sarah is now more believable when she belts sad love songs. She no longer has to internalize because she can perfectly relate with the lyrics."
- Remy Umerez of Journal Online stated "She explores more on the many faces of love in Vehnee Saturno's "Sino Nga Ba Siya", to biritable "Kung Siya ang Mahal" and the only danceable cut "Handang Umibig Muli."
- Rito P. Asilo of Philippine Daily Inquirer said "If you're tired of the cacophony of imitative covers and repetitive melodies on the local recording scene, you’ll find Sarah Geronimo’s latest album, One Heart, a breath of fresh air." He described the album as a "more mature sound for Geronimo."

== Promotion and commercial performance ==
In December 2010, the music video of the hit single "Sino Nga Ba Siya" has premiered. The single premiered at #9 at the MYX Music Charts and was able to be at #1 spot.

At May 13, 2011, the album was released nationwide and was able to have its peek position at #3 at the Astroplus Music Bars and also got the #1 spot. At June 21, 2011, the second single of the album "Kung Siya Ang Mahal" has premiered at #9 at the MYX Music Charts.

Though there has not been an official tour for the album, Geronimo was able to promote her album at selected malls and it got a grand launch on the noon-time Sunday variety show ASAP Rocks in ABS-CBN where she is a mainstay host/performer. Geronimo sang the lead single "Sino Nga Ba Siya" together with Angeline Quinto and Yeng Constantino. The song "Ikaw" was also performed with Martin Nievera and Erik Santos and lastly, she sang the second single "Kung Siya Ang Mahal".

After two months of its release, the album was able to reach a Platinum status certified by PARI. To date it has sold 100,000 units.

== Track listing ==
No.	Title	Writer(s)	Arranger(s)	Length
1.	"Sino Nga Ba Siya"	Vehnee Saturno	Arnold Buena	3:46
2.	"Kung Siya Ang Mahal"	Vehnee Saturno	Marc Santos	4:23
3.	"Sa Isip Ko"	Dennis Garcia	Ferdie Marquez	3:47
4.	"If You Could Read My Mind"	Christian Martinez	Ferdie Marquez	4:24
5.	"I Miss You"	Louie Ocampo	Arnold Buena	4:09
6.	"Nag-iisang Ikaw"	Vehnee Saturno	Marc Santos	4:13
7.	"One Heart"	Vehnee Saturno	Marc Santos	3:55
8.	"Bata" (featuring Kean Cipriano)	Kean Cipriano	Rye Sarmiento	3:59
9.	"More Than You’d Believe"	Tito Cayamanda	Tito Cayamanda	4:26
10.	"Bakit Pa Ba?"	Vehnee Saturno	Arnold Buena	4:44
11.	"Fallin'"	Janno Gibbs	Benjie Pating	4:01
12.	"Handang Umibig Muli"	Raffy Calicdan, Amber Davis	Marcus Davis	3:19
13.	"Within"	Vehnee Saturno	Arnold Buena	4:15
14.	"Ikaw" (duet with Martin Nievera)	George Canseco	Louie Ocampo	4:10
15.	"Fallin'"	Carole Bayer Sager (lyrics), Marvin Hamlisch (music)	Dante Tañedo	3:24
Total length:				60:55

Notes

- Track 3 is a cover of Agot Isidro.
- Track 6 is a cover of Louie Heredia.
- Track 10 is a cover of Jay R.
- Track 11 is a cover of Janno Gibbs.
- Track 15 is a cover of Teri DeSario and was used as the theme song to the 2011 film Catch Me, I'm in Love.

== Certifications ==
Country	Provider	Certification	Sales
Philippines	PARI	6× Platinum	100,000+

== Charts ==
Chart	Peak position
Philippines Odyssey Weekly Albums	1
