= The World Is Flat (song) =

Single by Echobelly

from the album Lustra
- Released: 11 August 1997
- Genre: Rock, indie rock
- Length: 4:56
- Label: Epic
- Songwriters: Sonya Madan, Glenn Johansson
- Producers: Gil Norton, Echobelly

Echobelly singles chronology
"Dark Therapy" (1996)	"The World Is Flat" (1997)	"Here Comes the Big Rush" (1997)

"The World Is Flat" is the first single from Echobelly's third album Lustra. It was released by the Britpop group on 11 August 1997.

The song was included on both of the greatest hits albums that Echobelly have released; I Can't Imagine The World Without Me and The Best of Echobelly. 3 of the b-sides (Falling Flame, Drive Myself Distracted & Holding The Wire) were released on the US release of Lustra.

A music video was made for the song.

It reached 31 in the UK Singles Chart.

== Track listing ==
=== UK and Australian CD 1 ===
All tracks are written by Sonya Madan and Glen Johansson.

No.	Title	Length
1.	"The World Is Flat"	4:01
2.	"Holding The Wire"	3:32
3.	"The World Is Flat (remix)"	4:57
Total length:		12:30

=== UK CD 2 and Japanese promo ===
All tracks are written by Sonya Madan and Glen Johansson.

No.	Title	Length
1.	"The World Is Flat"	4:01
2.	"Drive Myself Distracted"	4:21
3.	"Falling Flame"	4:06
Total length:		12:28

=== UK maxi-single ===
All tracks are written by Sonya Madan and Glen Johansson.

No.	Title	Length
1.	"The World Is Flat"
2.	"Holding The Wire"
3.	"Drive Myself Distracted"
4.	"Falling Flame"
5.	"The World Is Flat (remix)"

=== UK promo ===
All tracks are written by Sonya Madan and Glen Johansson.

No.	Title	Length
1.	"The World Is Flat"

=== 12" promo vinyl ===
All tracks are written by Sonya Madan and Glen Johansson.

No.	Title	Length
1.	"The World Is Flat"
2.	"The World Is Flat (remix)"
3.	"The World Is Flat (instrumental remix)"

== Credits ==
- Bass – James Harris
- Drums – Andy Henderson
- Guitar – Glenn Johansson, Debbie Smith
- Voice – Sonya Madan
- Engineer – Niven Garland, Roy Spong, Danton Supple
- Producer - Gil Norton, Echobelly
