= Insomnio =

Insomnio may refer to:

- Insomnio (Hamlet album), 1998
- Insomnio (Sol D'Menta album), 2001
- "Insomnio" (song), 2003, by Kumbia Kings
- Insomnio (film), a 1998 Spanish comedy film

== See also ==
- Insomnia (disambiguation)
