= Insomniac =

Insomniac or The Insomniac may refer to:

- A person who has insomnia

== Music ==
- Insomniac (Green Day album), 1995
- Insomniac (Enrique Iglesias album), 2007
- "Insomniac" (song), a 1994 song by Echobelly
- "Insomniac", a song by Billy Pilgrim
- Insomniac, a record label founded by Poets of the Fall
- Insomniac (promoter), an American music tour promoter focusing primarily on electronic music events

== Other media ==
- The Insomniac (2013 film), an American film directed by Monty Miranda
- Insomniac Games, an American video game developer
- Insomniac Press, a Canadian independent book publisher
- Insomniac with Dave Attell, a 2001–04 television series

== See also ==
- The Insomniax, an American songwriting/production duo
- Insomnia (disambiguation)
