= Dark Therapy (song) =

Single by Echobelly

from the album On
- Released: February 1996
- Genre: Rock, Indie Rock
- Length: 4:56
- Label: Fauve, Rhythm King
- Songwriters: Sonya Madan, Glenn Johansson
- Producers: Paul Kolderie, Sean Slade, Glen Johansson, Simon Vinestock

Echobelly singles chronology
"King of the Kerb" (1995)	"Dark Therapy" (1996)	"The World Is Flat" (1997)

"Dark Therapy" is the third and final single from Echobelly's second album On. It was released by the Britpop group in February 1996.

The song was included on both of the greatest hits albums that Echobelly have released; I Can't Imagine The World Without Me and The Best of Echobelly. The song was also re-released acoustically by Glen Johansson and Sonya Madan under the name Calm of Zero. It appears on the EP Acoustic Sessions 1.

A music video was made for the song.

It reached 20 in the UK Singles Chart, making it their second highest-charting single to date (behind Great Things).

== Track listing ==
=== CD ===
All tracks are written by Sonya Madan and Glen Johansson

No.	Title	Length
1.	"Dark Therapy"	4:56
2.	"We Know Better"	4:03
3.	"Atom"	2:49
4.	"Aloha Lolita"	3:44
Total length:		15:32

- Tracks 2, 3 & 4 were re-released on both the expanded edition of On,
- Tracks 3 & 4 were re-released on the greatest hits album I Can't Imagine The World Without Me.

=== 7" Vinyl ===
All tracks are written by Sonya Madan and Glen Johansson

No.	Title	Length
1.	"Dark Therapy"	4:56
2.	"We Know Better"	4:03
Total length:		8:59

- A 12" promo Vinyl was also released which only contains an extended version of Dark Therapy, and no other tracks. The song lasts 5:15.

== Credits ==
- Bass – James Harris
- Drums – Andy Henderson
- Guitar – Glenn Johansson, Debbie Smith
- Vocals – Sonya Madan
- Cello - Audrey Riley
- Piano - Simon Lacey
- Engineer – Jim Brumby
- Producer - Paul Kolderie, Sean Slade, Glen Johansson, Simon Vinestock
- Mixer - Simon Vinestock
- Design/Art direction - Morgan Penn
- Cover photography - Michael Heissner
