= Great Things (Echobelly song) =

1995 single by Echobelly

Single by Echobelly

from the album On
- Released: 21 August 1995
- Length: 3:32
- Label: Fauve, Rhythm King
- Songwriter(s): Sonya Madan, Glenn Johansson
- Producer(s): Paul Kolderie

Echobelly singles chronology
"Close… But" (1994)	"Great Things" (1995)	"King of the Kerb" (1995)

"Great Things" is a song by Britpop band Echobelly, released as the first single from their second album, On (1995), in August 1995. The song is about inspiration and aspiration and how "everyone is hungry for something". It reached 13 on the UK Singles Chart, making it their highest-charting single. The song was included on both of the greatest hits albums that Echobelly have released: I Can't Imagine the World Without Me and The Best of Echobelly. All B-sides to the single were re-released on the expanded edition of On.

== Track listings ==
All tracks are written by Sonya Madan and Glen Johansson.

UK CD1
No.	Title	Length
1.	"Great Things"	3:32
2.	"Here Comes The Scene"	3:18
3.	"God's Guest List"	3:36
4.	"On Turn Off"	3:17
Total length:		13:43

UK CD2
No.	Title	Length
1.	"Great Things"	3:32
2.	"On Turn On"	3:18
3.	"Bunty"	2:13
4.	"One after 5AM"	2:14
Total length:		11:17

- Tracks three and four were recorded and released within 24 hours. The music label releasing this single wanted Echobelly to give them two B-sides, so Madan and Johansson quickly wrote and recorded both the tracks acoustically in a bathroom.

== Credits ==
- Bass – Alexander Keyser
- Drums – Andy Henderson
- Guitar – Glenn Johansson, Debbie Smith
- Voice – Sonya Madan
- Lap Steel Guitar (on God's Guest List) – B.J. Cole
- Engineer – Sean Slade
- Producer – Paul Kolderie
- Cover design – Stylorouge
- Cover photography – Ray Burmiston
