= Tell Me Why (Echobelly song) =

Single by Echobelly

from the album People Are Expensive
- Released: May 2001
- Genre: Post-Britpop, Indie Rock, Rock
- Length: 4:58
- Label: Fry Up
- Songwriters: Sonya Madan, Glenn Johansson
- Producer: Echobelly

Echobelly singles chronology
"Digit" (2001)	"Tell Me Why" (2001)	"Kali Yuga" (2001)

"Tell Me Why" is the second single of Echobelly's fourth album People Are Expensive. It reached 43 on the UK Singles Chart.

== Track listing ==
All tracks are written by Sonya Madan and Glen Johansson.

No.	Title	Length
1.	"Tell Me Why"	4:58
2.	"I Am Awake"	3:51
3.	"When I See Red"	3:56
Total length:		12:45

== Credits ==
- Bass – James Harris
- Drums – Andy Henderson
- Guitar – Glenn Johansson
- Voice – Sonya Madan
- Recorded by – Dick Meaney
- Cover Art – Pascal Maillard
- Producer – Echobelly (excluding "Tell Me Why", produced by Ben Hillier)
