= Insomniac (song) =

Single by Echobelly

from the album Everyone's Got One
- Released: March 1994
- Genre: Britpop
- Length: 4:15
- Label: Fauve, Rhythm King
- Songwriter(s): Sonya Madan, Glenn Johansson

Echobelly singles chronology
"Bellyache" (1993)	"Insomniac" (1994)	"I Can't Imagine the World Without Me" (1994)

Audio sample
- file; help

"Insomniac" is a song by the Britpop band Echobelly. It was released as a single in March 1994 and was included on the band's album, Everyone's Got One. The song, written by Sonya Madan and Glenn Johansson, is primarily about drug abuse.

The single received positive critical reviews and peaked at #47 on the UK music charts. It was featured on the soundtrack for the film Dumb and Dumber.

== Background ==
"Insomniac" was composed by band members Sonya Aurora Madan and Glenn Johansson. It is based on a 4/4 alternating verse/chorus structure and may be a musical homage to one of Echobelly's major influences, Morrissey.

Billboard wrote that the song is a "gentle warning of the dangers of snorting too much speed". However, according to Britpop and the English Music Tradition, the song might be a "dig" at Britpop's cocaine-driven lifestyle at the time (which is highlighted by the lines "Whatever turned you on/You put it up your nose" and "No sleep at all/Carry me home").

== Release ==
"Insomniac" was released as a single in March 1994 with the b-side "Talent". It was then included as the seventh track of Echobelly's debut album, Everyone's Got One, which was released in August 1994. The song was also included on the band's 2001 compilation album I Can't Imagine the World Without Me and their 2008 release The Best Of Echobelly.

=== Critical reception ===
The single received positive reviews from music critics, who called it "stunning" and "one of the best singles of 1994". According to author John Harris, "Insomniac" was one of Echobelly's two best songs, along with "Bellyache". Allmusic's Ned Raggett wrote that "at the band's best ... Madan grapples with personal politics and dreams full on -- "Insomniac" and "Close...But," with its pictures of relationships fracturing on all fronts and resolution to look beyond them for something better, make for entertaining blasts of inspiration."

Morrissey praised the song in an interview, stating that it was, "in a sane world, an indisputable top five record. It is astonishing."

=== Chart performance ===
"Insomniac" charted at #47 in the UK for the week ending on April 2, 1994. This was the single's only appearance on the music charts.

== In popular media ==
"Insomniac" was featured on the soundtrack for the film Dumb and Dumber.

== Music video ==
The song's music video features three performances by the band, with songwriter-vocalist Madan wearing three different outfits: black clothes and black make-up; a white Union Jack T-shirt; and a red sequined dress and blonde wig. The video "takes full advantage of Madan's dramatic presence", and she dances in front of the camera for the duration of the song in the three contrasting outfits, before taking the wig off at the end.

== Track list ==
7"

1. "Insomniac" - 3.46
2. "Centipede" - 4.03
3. "Talent" - 2.07
- Tracks 2 & 3 were re-released on the expanded version of Everyone's Got One.

== Charts ==
Chart	Peak position
UK Singles	47
