= Insomnia & Other Lullabyes =

Studio album by Cynthia Alexander
- Released: 1996 (Philippines)
- Genre: Alternative, folk rock
- Length: 37:33
- Label: independent

Cynthia Alexander chronology
Insomnia & Other Lullabyes (1996)	Rippingyarns (2000)

Insomnia & Other Lullabyes is the debut album of independent Filipino singer-songwriter Cynthia Alexander released in 1996. The album received local critical acclaim, comparing Alexander to Joni Mitchell. The album earned Alexander the Best Alternative Music Album and Best New Artist awards, at the 1998 Katha Music Awards, in the Philippines.

== Track listing ==
#	Title	Duration
1.	"Insomnia"	3:22
2.	"Rose"	4:13
3.	"Hiroshima"	3:45
4.	"Slipping Away"	3:31
5.	"Comfort In Your Strangeness"	3:33
6.	"Hello Baby"	3:53
7.	"Malaya"	4:36
8.	"Wait"	4:06
9.	"No Umbrella"	3:19
10.	"Those Days"	3:15
