= L2 (duo) =

L2 is a pop duo consisting of New York City based sisters Melissa Labbadia, 22, and Jessica Labbadia, 19. Their music has been featured on many popular celebrity sites, and they have had two singles on the Billboard Hot Dance/Club chart.

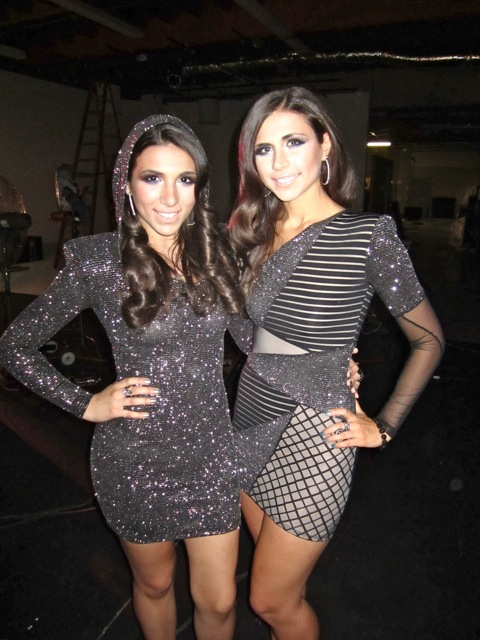
L2

== Career ==
=== Early years ===
Melissa and Jessica Labbadia started singing, acting and performing at a young age. They recorded their first demo CD and wrote their first original song in 2005. The sisters went on to perform at many venues in New York City, including Manhattan dance clubs Tenjune and Splash; the rock clubs The Bitter End, DROM, Arlene’s Grocery, and The Cutting Room; cabaret style at Don’t Tell Mama in NYC. L2 have also opened for popular performers such as Ryan Cabrera, Donnie Klang and Anberlin.

=== 2011-2012 ===
In 2011, they released their single Criminal In Bed. The song played on Sirius/XM Radio along with many other FM stations. The band made their debut on the Billboard Hot Dance/Club charts with the Top 10 single Boys or Girls. The song got regular radio rotation on National Mix-shows across the country and played nationally in rotation on Music Choice Dance and AOL Radio, along with many Internet Radio stations and local FM radio stations. L2's single Insomnia made it to the number 3 spot on the Billboard Hot Dance/Club charts in February 2012, and was still on the charts in March.

=== Music videos ===
The duo released their first music video for Boys or Girls on January 18, 2011. Their next music video, Insomnia, was released on February 3, 2012, just after the single became the #3 Breakout Song on the Billboard Dance/Club Charts. The video was directed by Matt Alonzo (Far East Movement "Like A G6").

=== TV placements ===
L2 has signed non-exclusive music licensing deals with Dish Nation (Fox TV), DMX, MTV/VH1 Networks and Bunim Murray. Many of their songs have been played on Keeping Up with the Kardashians, Tough Love and The Real World: San Diego. Recently, the song Beautiful was played on an episode of Khloe and Lamar.
