= Bellyache (Echobelly song) =

Single by Echobelly

from the album Everyone's Got One
- Released: November 1993
- Recorded: Stone Room Studios
- Genre: Britpop, indie rock
- Length: 4:29 (album version)
- Label: Pandemonium Records
- Songwriters: Sonya Madan, Glenn Johansson
- Producers: Dick Meany and Echobelly

Echobelly singles chronology
"Bellyache" (1993)	"Insomniac" (1994)

"Bellyache" is the first single released by the Britpop band Echobelly in 1993. The songs "Bellyache" and "Give Her A Gun" were re-recorded for their debut album, Everyone's Got One. The other two b-sides, "Sleeping Hitler" and "I Don't Belong Here" were re-recorded and released as b-sides to "Kali Yuga", from the album People Are Expensive. The EP was also released on 12" vinyl.

The song was included on both of the greatest hits albums that Echobelly have released; I Can't Imagine The World Without Me and The Best Of Echobelly. The b-sides were also re-released on the expanded version of Everyone's Got One.

No video was made for the song. The song is about a friend who went through abortion.

== Track listing ==
All tracks are written by Sonya Madan and Glen Johansson.

No.	Title	Length
1.	"Bellyache"	4:56
2.	"Sleeping Hitler"	4:38
3.	"Give Her A Gun"	4:16
4.	"I Don't Belong Here"	5:00
Total length:		18:50

== Credits ==
- Bass – Alexander Keyser
- Drums – Andy Henderson
- Guitar – Glenn Johansson
- Voice – Sonya Madan
- Engineer – Dick Meaney
- Cover Photography – Ray Burmiston
- Producer – Dick Meaney and Echobelly
