= Lustra (album) =

Studio album by Echobelly
- Released: 16 November 1997
- Genre: Alternative rock
- Length: 46:18
- Label: Epic
- Producer: Gil Norton

Echobelly chronology
On (1995)	Lustra (1997)	I Can't Imagine the World Without Me (2001)

Singles from Lustra
- 1. "The World Is Flat" Released: 11 August 1997; 2. "Here Comes the Big Rush" Released: October 1997

Professional ratings
Review scores
Source	Rating
AllMusic	2.5/5 stars
NME	5/10 stars
Wall of Sound	79/100

Lustra is the third studio album by English alternative rock band Echobelly. The album was delayed due to label difficulties, line-up changes and the health problems of singer Sonya Madan. The album only reached number 47 in the UK Albums Chart.

== Track listing ==
All songs written by Sonya Madan and Glenn Johansson.

1. "Bulldog Baby" – 4:32
2. "I'm Not a Saint" – 3:45
3. "Here Comes the Big Rush" – 4:25
4. "Iris Art" – 3:44
5. "The World Is Flat" – 4:01
6. "Everyone Knows Better" – 3:42
7. "Wired On" – 3:23
8. "O" – 4:12
9. "Bleed" – 2:40
10. "Paradise" – 2:34
11. "Angel B" – 5:26
12. "Lustra" – 3:54

US bonus tracks

13. "Heroes in June" – 2:41
14. "Mouth Almighty" –3:59
15. "Drive Myself Distracted" – 4:22
16. "Falling Flame" – 4:04
17. "Holding the Wire" – 3:34

== Singles ==
- "The World Is Flat" was released as the first single, and reached 31 in the UK Singles Chart.
- "Here Comes The Big Rush" was released as the second single, and reached 56 in the UK Singles Chart.
- The two singles, as well as "Iris Art" were included on the 2001 compilation "I Can't Imagine the World Without Me".
- "Bulldog Baby" and "The World Is Flat" were featured on the 2008 compilation "The Best of Echobelly"

== Personnel ==
Echobelly

- Sonya Madan - vocals
- Glenn Johansson and Debbie Smith - guitar
- James Harris - bass
- Andy Henderson - drums

Technical

- Gil Norton - producer
- Roy Spong and Niven Garland - engineers
- Gil Norton and Roy Spong - mixer
