= Maria Aragon =

Canadian singer of Filipino descent (born 2000)

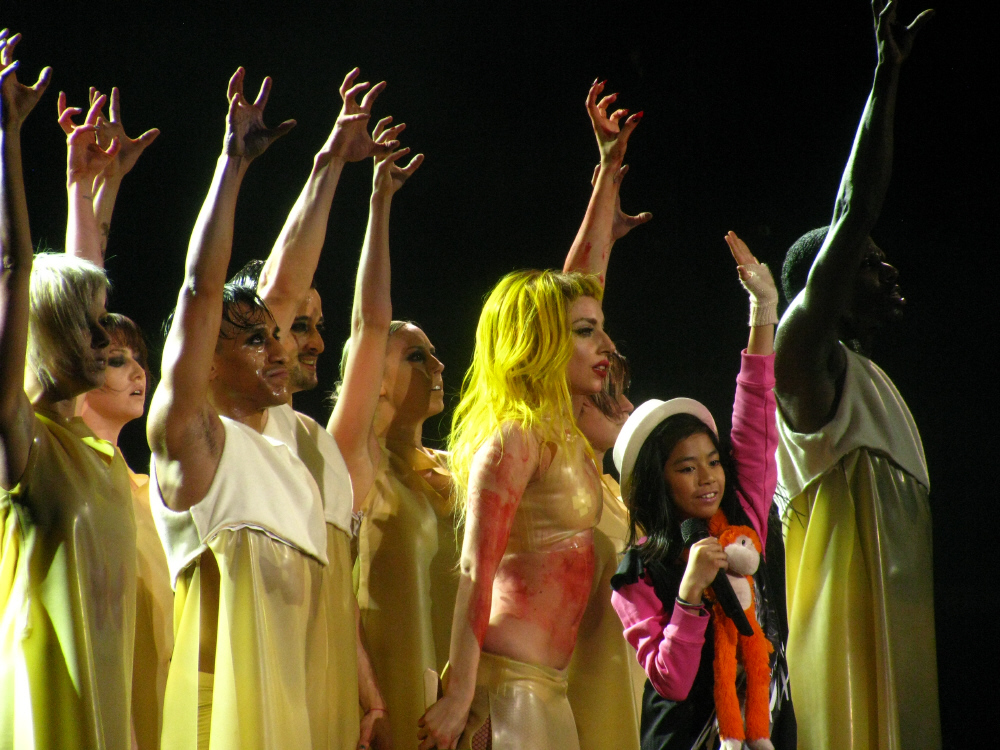
- Aragon with Lady Gaga in 2011
- Born: 17 July 2000 (age 26); Winnipeg, Manitoba, Canada
- Occupations: Musician; singer-songwriter
- Years active: 2006–present
- Musical career
- Genres: Pop; dance; teen pop; rock
- Instruments: Vocals; piano; guitar
- Label: Star Records (2011)

YouTube information
- Channel: Maria Aragon
- Years active: 2006–present
- Genre: Music
- Subscribers: 236 thousand
- Views: 60.3 million
- Last updated: 23 March 2026

Maria Aragon (born 17 July 2000) is a Canadian singer. Aragon gained fame after a YouTube video of her performing Lady Gaga's "Born This Way" went viral.

== Career ==
=== 2011: Career beginnings, The Monster Ball Tour with Lady Gaga and Maria Aragon ===
On February 16, 2011, a video of Aragon performing a cover of "Born This Way" by Lady Gaga was posted to her sister's YouTube channel to showcase her talent to friends and family. The video caught Lady Gaga's attention when entertainment blogger Perez Hilton sent Gaga her "Born This Way" cover, and she was so impressed by Aragon's performance that she retweeted a link to the video. In a week, her video reached over 11 million views. As of October 2015, the video had over 58 million views.

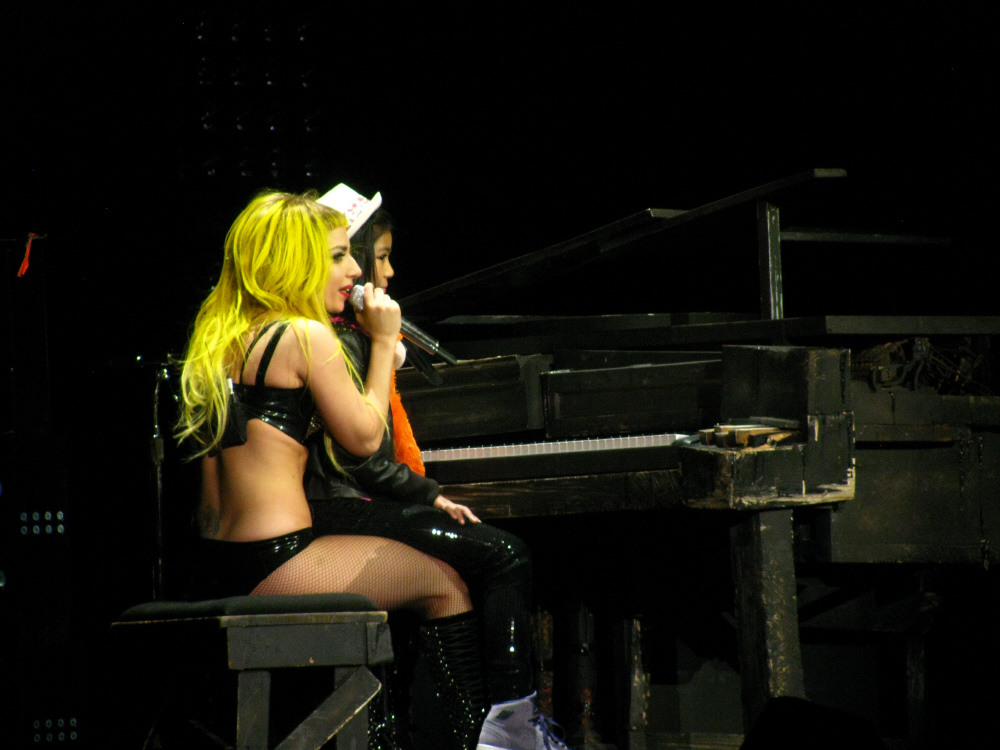
Lady Gaga and Aragon performing during The Monster Ball Tour, in 2011

During an interview on HOT 103 in Winnipeg, Lady Gaga called into the show to tell Aragon how moved she had been by her performance. Lady Gaga then invited an already surprised Aragon to perform "Born This Way" with her at The Monster Ball Tour concert in Toronto. In Toronto, Ontario, Canada, 99.9 Virgin Radio called Aragon and offered to fly her to Toronto for free. On March 3, 2011, Aragon joined Lady Gaga on stage at the Air Canada Centre, where they performed an acoustic duet of "Born This Way" with Aragon sitting on Gaga's lap, playing piano, singing and Lady Gaga working the pedals. Aragon later rejoined Lady Gaga and her team of back up dancers for an uptempo finale version of "Born This Way".

American talk show host Ellen DeGeneres took notice of her from emails and petitions requesting for Aragon's appearance on the show and eventually invited Aragon to appear on her show on February 21, 2011, where Aragon again performed "Born This Way" on the piano earning a standing ovation from the audience. On March 29, 2011, Aragon performed "Born This Way" at her home for Canadian Prime Minister Stephen Harper. She and Harper also performed a duet of John Lennon's song "Imagine".

In 2011, she appeared in commercials for HTC singing the K'naan song, Wavin' Flag and Gap Kids, singing "I Want Candy". She performed at the 2011 Canada Day concert on Parliament Hill, which included Prince William and Catherine Middleton, the Duke and Duchess of Cambridge respectively, in attendance, as part of their 2011 royal tour of Canada.

On July 20, 2011, Aragon arrived in the Philippines where she signed a contract with Star Records, the same recording company who also signed Charice. Her first self-titled album consist of seven tracks including "You're My Home", composed and originally sung by Odette Quesada and remade by Lea Salonga for the Star Cinema film, Way Back Home. Among the songs in Aragon's album is her rendition of Lady Gaga's "Born This Way", which brought her international exposure. To promote the album, she appeared on several ABS CBN shows including the musical variety show, ASAP Rocks and series of mall shows.

=== 2012–present: Further singing and #SoulfulSessions ===
In 2012, Aragon filmed and released a video entitled, "Rehearsals for Google Zeitgeist London 2012". The video shows Aragon rehearsing for the Google Zeitgeist London, hence the title. Later, Aragon was a featured artist in Liona Boyd's Christmas single entitled, "My Special Christmas Present Is You", which was released on December 11, 2012, following the video's release on December 7, 2012. Later, Aragon released a cover mashup of Alex Clare's "Too Close" and Justin Bieber's "As Long As You Love Me".

In 2013, Aragon returned covering her favorite Disney songs, featuring her friend, Ashly Pascual and her brother, JV Aragon which was released on. Later, Aragon's cover of "Clarity" by Zedd ft. Foxes, was released September 23, 2013. Aragon started a session entitled, #SoulfulSessions, where she covers various songs by various artists. Aragon's first session was released on November 4, 2013, where she covered "All of Me" by John Legend. Following the first session, Aragon released an original single entitled, "You Are Enough". Then, Aragon released sessions for "Royals" and "Roar".

== Filmography ==
List of television performances
Year	Title	Role	Notes
2011	The Ellen DeGeneres Show	Herself	Guest performer, NBC
2011	ASAP 20	Herself	Guest performer, ABS-CBN
2011	Eat Bulaga!	Herself	Guest performer, GMA Network

== Discography ==
- Maria Aragon (2011)
