= Para sa Tao =

Single by HUMANFOLK

from the album Humanfolk
- Released: May 2011
- Recorded: 2009–2010
- Genre: World
- Length: 7:36 (full version); 04:17 (radio edit)
- Label: MCA Music
- Songwriter(s): Johnny Alegre
- Producer(s): Johnny Alegre

"Para sa Tao" (English: "For the People") is a Philippine world music song by HUMANFOLK from their eponymous first album; composed by guitarist Johnny Alegre in 2009, and which became the group's carrier hit single. The song was arranged by keyboardist-vocalist Abby Clutario. A music video directed by Daphne Oliveros was produced for the song (with an alternate, expanded version), and for which a radio edit was created. Both the full and radio edit versions of the song were included in the eponymous Humanfolk album, released in May 2011 by MCA Music (Universal Music Group).

On November 27, 2012, the Philippine Association of the Record Industry (PARI) conferred the Awit Award to HUMANFOLK for "Para sa Tao" as Best World Music Recording.

== Composition ==
The song is delivered in 5/4 quintuple time, utilizing the natural phrasing and rhythm of the lyrics. The words unfold as a children's song introducing the Abakada, the indigenized Tagalog letters of the Philippines. The verses consist of the native alphabet sung repeatedly, and gradually developed as a canon, a contrapuntal musical technique that employs overlapped imitations of a musical phrase. In the contrasting bridge, the lyrics hint at a folktale of seafarers in the north (i.e. "layag sa hilaga") setting sail for the mysterious south (i.e. "timog, mahiwaga").

The title, "Para sa Tao" is a pun on the final cadence of the Baybayin (O/U-Pa-Ra-Sa-Ta-O/U-Wa-Ya), the Pre-Hispanic Tagalog script from which the Abakada is derived. The present-day Modern Filipino Alphabet (Filipino: "Makabagong alpabetong Filipino"), in turn, is the contemporary adaptation of the classical Abakada.

== Musicians ==
Abby Clutario, vocals, keyboards & Chapman Stick
Johnny Alegre, acoustic guitar & backing vocals
Cynthia Alexander, bass & backing vocals
Malek Lopez, electronics
Abe Lagrimas, Jr., drums (session)
Uly Avante, woodblocks, shaker & pandeiro (session)

== Production ==
Words and Music by Johnny Alegre
Arranged by Abby Clutario
Produced by Johnny Alegre
Recorded by Hazel Pascua at Sound Creation Studio
Post-production, mixing and mastering by Boyet Aquino
Limited License issued by PH Affinity Productions to MCA Music for Distribution
OSR Released on Compact Disk by MCA Music. Executive Producer: Ricky Ilacad
