= Urban folk =

Urban folk or city folk may refer to:

- Folk music from any urban cultural tradition (as opposed to country music)
  - CityFolk Festival, an annual music festival in Ottawa, Canada
- Anti-folk music, a music genre that takes and subverts the earnestness of politically charged 1960s folk music
- People, residing in cities
- Animal Crossing: City Folk, the third video game in the Animal Crossing series
