= Siakol =

Filipino rock band

- Origin: Parañaque, Metro Manila, Philippines
- Genres: OPM; Pinoy rock; alternative rock; pop rock; hard rock; alternative metal
- Years active: 1994–present
- Labels: Alpha Records Philippines; Synergy Music Corporation (Philippines)
- Members: Warren Antig Aurin; Wowie Flores; Marquel Martin; Melvin Camato; Peter Paul Plazon
- Past members: Noel Palomo; Miniong Cervantes; Oyie Bunao (deceased); Wally Gaspar; James "Jaime" Rodriguez

Siakol is a Filipino rock band formed in 1994 in Parañaque City, Metro Manila.

The band is one of the several groups that spearheaded the 1990s Philippine alternative rock explosion and is known for their hit songs "Lakas Tama", "Peksman", "Kanto", "Biyaheng Impyerno" and "Bakit Ba". Founded in 1994 by Noel Palomo, Wowie Flores, Oyie Bunao, Miniong Cervantes, and Wally Gaspar, the band was a prominent fixture of the Tunog Kalye era and was especially popular among college and high school students across the Philippines during the '90s.

Since 2020, two factions from the original lineup have been in an ongoing dispute over the ownership rights to the name "Siakol". Both Noel Palomo and Miniong Cervantes announced their departure from the band, leaving Wowie Flores as the sole remaining original member. Palomo subsequently formed a new band, which he initially called "Repakol" but later also began to refer to as "Siakol", escalating tensions with Flores. Cervantes later joined Palomo's group. The ownership dispute over the name is currently under review by the Intellectual Property Office of the Philippines.

== Etymology ==
According to the band members, Siakol is a term they coined which pertains to a "free, happy and sometimes naughty state of mind". It is also alluded to be a word play on jakol, Filipino slang for masturbation. Furthermore, in a separate interview, former frontman Noel Palomo explained that "Siakol" was already a common expression used by bystanders in their hometown of Parañaque even before the band was formed. Palomo later suggested the name to the band's management during the early days. The management initially tried changing the spelling to "Shock Call" but eventually reverted to Siakol.

== Background ==
Formed in 1994 by former best friends Manuel "Noel" Palomo, Chris Laurence "Wowie" Flores, and Rolando "Oyie" Bunao, the band first gained exposure as guest performers in a local Battle of the Bands competition in their hometown of Parañaque, performing as a quintet with recruited acquaintances Anthony "Miniong" Cervantes and Reynaldo "Wally" Gaspar. The band started writing original compositions (mostly written by Palomo and arranged collectively by the whole band) which was well received by the public. They were subsequently managed by Jason Gerodias.

Gaspar departed after the release of their debut album. Founding drummer Oyie Bunao left the band in 2003 following a reported personal conflict with Palomo and was replaced by James "Blauff" Rodriguez. Rodriguez was later succeeded by Peter Paul Plazon of fellow 1990s Pinoy rock band Grin Department, who became Siakol’s longest-serving drummer after joining in 2012.

The band’s songs, from their 1996 debut up to the present, continue to receive significant radio airplay and frequent guestings at fiestas and local events across the Philippines. Known for their all-Tagalog songs, the band has been widely regarded as "the face of the Tunog Kalye era" (colloquial term of the Philippines' brand of OPM alternative rock which is popular among the masses in the 1990s, literally translated as "street sound" in English).

The band’s lyrical themes draw heavily from Filipino pop culture, the everyday love life of the typical Filipino, and observational humor. They are regarded as one of the most successful OPM bands of all time, and their songs remain among the most frequently sung in videoke establishments throughout the Philippines up to the present.

Their band's history was featured on GMA Network's Magpakailanman, a drama anthology series, starring Epy Quizon, Vandolph Quizon, and Boy 2 Quizon, who portrayed Palomo, Cervantes, and Flores, respectively, in 2004.

=== 2019 Davao gig stage scuffle ===
In March 2019, a Facebook user shared video footage of Siakol performing at a gig in Davao City, where vocalist Noel Palomo was seen verbally berating bassist Wowie Flores onstage for undisclosed reasons. A crew member attempted to intervene, but when Palomo continued to provoke Flores, the latter threw the first punch, resulting in a brief scuffle. Security and crew members broke up the altercation. Although the band resumed playing afterward, the duration of the gig was prematurely cut short because of the incident.

Palomo later released a video addressing the issue, dismissing it in jest as mere "joking around" and claiming that "the fistfight was part of the show". He also stated that he and Flores had already settled their differences.

=== Major lineup changes ===
Notable founding members Noel Palomo and Miniong Cervantes, who had both been in the group since its inception, left the band around late 2019 to early 2020 amid an apparent internal rift with other members. Among the primary reasons cited were Palomo's silent intention to go solo, alleged lack of professionalism, and his reportedly diminishing vocal abilities. Bassist Wowie Flores further alleged that Palomo also became agitated when he "sensed that someone from the group wanted to take over the lead vocal duties away from him", implying that Cervantes initially wanted to kick Palomo out of the group and replace him.

With Palomo leaving in 2019 to pursue a solo career, the band decided to forge on with Cervantes taking over the lead vocal duties; however, in late December 2019, Cervantes also announced his exit, citing the "toxic" personal conflict between Palomo and Flores as his primary reason. During their time with the group when the major internal conflict happened, Cervantes reportedly sided with Flores at first but eventually decided to leave the group as well.

After a brief stint as a solo musician, Palomo has been performing under the group "Noel Palomo & The Repakol", while Cervantes has focused on session work and collaborations with other artists, including later collaborations with Palomo’s Repakol. Their roles in Siakol were subsequently filled by new members. New frontman Warren Antig Aurin was a finalist on GMA-7's Pinoy Idol in 2008 and was also a member of the band Roots of Nature which represented the Philippines at the Global Battle of the Bands. Antig Aurin is notable for being a fraternity brother of Flores in Alpha Kappa Rho. Marquel Martin, meanwhile, is a member of another 90s Pinoy rock band, The Youth, completing the band as a quintet once again with the addition of guitarist Melvin Camato.

=== Band name dispute (2020–present) ===
Since 2020, Palomo, and later joined by Cervantes, now both members of Repakol, have been using the name "Siakol" interchangeably with "Repakol", despite previously stating that they were no longer part of the band as of early 2020. In his defense, Palomo claimed that he was the one who originally suggested the name "Siakol" in the first place, and therefore has the right to use it elsewhere. Sole remaining original member Wowie Flores has issued a statement that the band will be seeking legal advice on the matter. Meanwhile, Miniong Cervantes stated in a Facebook comment that the name ownership dispute has already been escalated to the Intellectual Property Office of the Philippines and is currently pending a decision.

== Personnel ==
=== "Siakol Official" faction and lineage ===
Present members (also currently known as Siakol Bagong Yugto)

- Warren Antig Aurin – lead vocals (2020–present)
- Wowie Flores – bass guitar (1994–present), backing vocals (2020–present)
- Marquel Martin – lead guitar, backing vocals (2020–present)
- Melvin Camato – rhythm guitar (2023–present)
- Peter Paul Plazon – drums and percussions (2012–present)

Former members

- Noel Palomo – lead vocals, occasional rhythm and acoustic guitars, chief songwriter (1994–2019)
- Miniong Cervantes – all guitars, backing vocals (1994–2019)
- Oyie Bunao† – drums and percussions (1994–2003)
- Wally Gaspar – rhythm and lead guitars (1994–1996)
- James "Blauff" Rodriguez – drums and percussions (2003–2012); rhythm and lead guitars, bass guitar (unofficial/touring/session 2000–2003)

Touring members

- Victor Domingo – backing vocals, percussions (2023–present)
- Chokoy Pasagui – guitars (2016)

=== Repakol faction ===
("Original Siakol" claimants since the 2020 name dispute)

- Noel Palomo – lead vocals
- Miniong Cervantes – all guitars, backing vocals
- Alvin Palomo – guitars
- Wilbert Jimenez – guitars, bass guitar
- Raz Itum – bass guitar
- Buwi Meneses – bass guitar (U.S. tours only)
- Zach Alcasid – drums and percussions
- Matthew Bravante – drums and percussions
- Henry San Juan – drums and percussions

== Discography ==
=== Albums ===
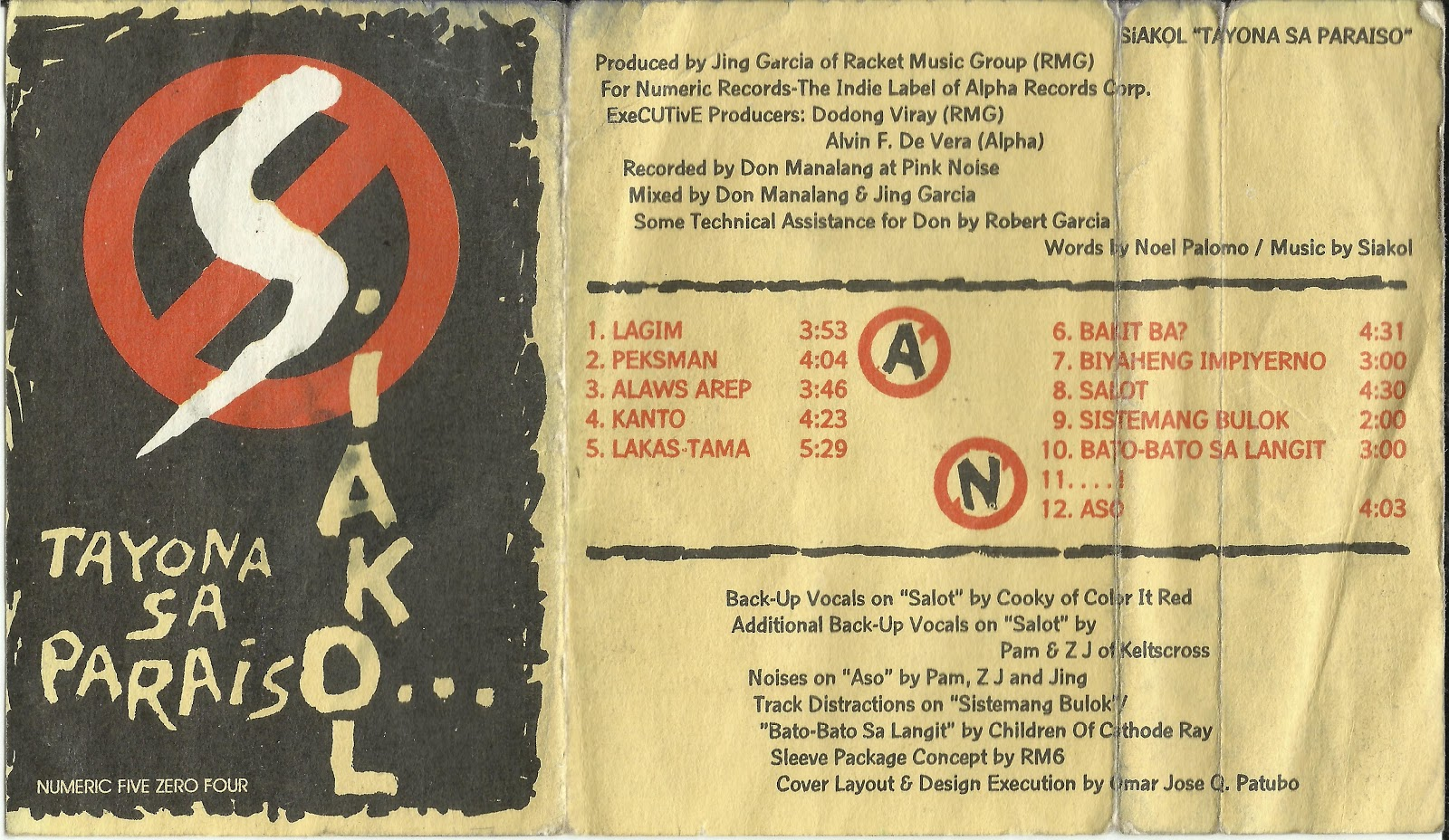
Inlet of Siakol's first album Tayo Na Sa Paraiso

Year	Title	Certifications
1996	Tayo Na Sa Paraiso	PARI: 4× Platinum
1998	Rekta	PARI: 2× Platinum
1999	Pantasya	PARI: Platinum
2000	Sa Pag-Ikot Ng Mundo	PARI: Gold
2001	Karoling	PARI: Gold
2003	Hiwaga	PARI: Gold
2005	Kabilang Mundo	PARI:
2005	The Best of Siakol, Vol. 1	PARI:
2010	Tropa	PARI:
2014	The Best of Siakol, Vol. 2	PARI:
2015	Haymabu	PARI:
2021	Ang Bagong Yugto	PARI:

=== Notable songs ===
- "Lakas Tama"
- "Peksman"
- "Bakit Ba"
- "Aso"
- "Rekta"
- "Balang Araw"
- "No Problem (Kapag Ikaw Ang Kasama)"
- "Itigil Na Natin"
- "Muli Bang Makikita"
- "Ikaw Lamang"
- "Pagmamahal"
- "Inday"
- "Balewala"
- "Malaya Ba"
- "Biyaheng Impiyerno"
- "Sige Na, Tuloy Pa"
- "Sa Pag-ikot ng Mundo"
- "'Wag Mong Isipin 'Yon"
- "D'yan Sa Buhay Mo"
- "Ayoko Na Sa'yo"
- "Habang Ang Lahat"
- "Yakap"
- "Gabay"
- "Matulog Ka Na'"
- "Hindi Mo Ba Alam"
- "Ikaw Lamang"
- "Manibela"
- "Hiwaga"
- "Inihaw"
- "Iniwan Mo Akong Nag-Iisa"
- "Kanto"
- "Lagim"
- "Maligayang Pasko"
- "Karoling"
- "Ngayong Pasko"
- "Ikaw Ba 'Yan"
- "Sa Isang Bote Ng Alak"
- "Malapit Na"
- "Kabilang Mundo"
- "Teka Lang"
- "Gobyerno"
- "Kung Walang Ikaw"
- "Aanhin"
- "Basted"
- "Gawing Langit ang Mundo"
- "Ituloy Mo Lang"
- "Asahan Mo"
- "P.I."
- "Tropa"
- "Rakenrol"
- "Walang Gano'n"
- "Bahay-Bahayan"
- "Akala Ko'y Langit"
- "Droga"
- "Imadyinin Mo"
- "Parang Mali"
- "Solb Ka Na Naman"
- "Mas Masaya Sa Pilipinas"
- "Hagupit"
- "Di Susuko"
