= People Are Expensive =

Studio album by Echobelly
- Released: 2001
- Recorded: The Dairy Studios, September Sound
- Genre: Alternative rock
- Label: Fry Up

Echobelly chronology
I Can't Imagine the World Without Me (2001)	People Are Expensive (2001)	Gravity Pulls (2004)

Singles from People Are Expensive
- 1. "Digit" Released: January 2001; 2. "Tell Me Why" Released: May 2001; 3. "Kali Yuga" Released: 8 October 2001

Professional ratings
Review scores
Source	Rating
Allmusic	3/5 stars

People Are Expensive is the fourth studio album by English rock band Echobelly.

== Track listing ==
All songs written by Sonya Madan and Glenn Johansson.

1. "Fear of Flying" – 5:02
2. "Tell Me Why" – 4:56
3. "Down to Earth" – 2:53
4. "People Are Expensive" – 2:18
5. "Digit" – 5:45
6. "Dying" – 4:58
7. "Kali Yuga" – 5:29
8. "Everything Is All" – 5:01
9. "A Map Is Not the Territory" – 6:12
10. "Ondine" – 4:09
11. "Point Dume" – 7:34

== Personnel ==
Echobelly

- Sonya Madan - vocals
- Glenn Johansson - guitar
- Ruth Owen - bass
- Andy Henderson - drums
