= Insomnia Publications =

British comic book publishing company

- Industry: Publishing
- Founded: 2006
- Founder: Crawford Coutts; Alasdair Duncan
- Headquarters: Edinburgh, Scotland
- Products: Comics, graphic novels
- Website: Official website

Insomnia Publications Ltd was a British comic book publishing company.

== History ==
Insomnia was an independent comics publisher founded by Managing Director Crawford Coutts in 2006 to publish his own work. It was based in Edinburgh, Scotland, with various partners in London, Dundee and Vancouver.

Insomnia began publishing Layer Zero in 2007, an anthology title as showcase for new creators.

2009 saw the release of Cancertown and Cages, the first Insomnia Graphic Novels by which the company would make its name as an independent publisher, focused on "instant trades" or "albums" in the European model, along with art portfolio books. It was also one of the first independent companies to partner with Sony to bring digital comics to the PSP.

Insomnia books are aimed at teen/mature readers and most have an 18+ age rating. The focus is on stories which are unusual, literate, challenging and thought-provoking.

In 2009 Insomnia launched the Vigil imprint for "Bio-Graphic Novels", starting with Burke and Hare.

Following internal problems in early 2010, Insomnia Publications filed final accounts with Companies House on 30 June 2010. On the 20 August 2010, Crawford Coutts issued a statement released creators from their contracts with the company.

== Management team ==
- Crawford Coutts (Managing Director and Publisher, Co-founder)

== Titles ==
- Layer Zero Anthologies by various creators

=== Graphic novels ===
- Cages by Xander Bennet and Melanie Cook. Foreword by Ben Templesmith (January 2009, ISBN 1-905808-10-0)
- Cancertown by Cy Dethan, Stephen Downey, Melanie Cook and Nic Wilkinson. Foreword by Bryan Talbot (May 2009, ISBN 1-905808-13-5)
- Buskers by Jeyems Samuel, Sean Michael Wilson and Michiru Morikawa (Oct 2009)

=== Vigil ===
Titles in the Virgil "Bio-Graphic Novels" imprint include:

- Burke and Hare by Martin Conaghan and Will Pickering. Foreword by Alan Grant (Oct 2009, ISBN 1-905808-12-7)

=== Art books ===
Art books include:

- MILK by Stref (Sept 2009 ISBN 1-905808-11-9)
