= Gravity Pulls =

Studio album by Echobelly
- Released: 4 May 2004
- Recorded: 2K, London
- Genre: Alternative rock
- Label: Fry Up
- Producer: Ian Grimble

Echobelly chronology
People Are Expensive (2001)	Gravity Pulls (2004)	The Best of Echobelly (2008)

Gravity Pulls is the fifth studio album by English rock band Echobelly.

== Track listing ==
All songs written by Sonya Madan and Glenn Johansson.

1. "Gravity Pulls" – 4:19
2. "To Get Me Thru the Good Times" – 4:18
3. "You Started a Fire in the Heart of a Wasted Life" – 4:02
4. "Djinn" – 4:42
5. "Big Sky Mind" – 6:05
6. "Strangely Drawn" – 3:00
7. "A Good Day" – 3:45
8. "What You Deserve" – 4:20
9. "One in a Million" – 3:22
10. "All Tomorrow Brings" – 4:41

== Personnel ==
Adapted from Discogs.

Echobelly

- Sonya Madan - vocals
- Glenn Johansson - guitar, piano, keyboards
- Ruth Owen - bass
- Andy Henderson - drums

with:

- Kate Sawbridge - cello
- Hannah Dawson - violin

Technical

- Richard Matthews - engineer
- Bunt Stafford-Clark - mastering
- Ian Grimble - producer
