= On (Echobelly album) =

1995 studio album by Echobelly

Studio album by Echobelly
- Released: 18 September 1995
- Recorded: Konk, London
- Genre: Britpop, power pop, alternative rock
- Length: 42:02
- Label: Fauve, 550, Rhythm King
- Producer: Paul Q. Kolderie, Sean Slade

Echobelly chronology
Everyone's Got One (1994)	On (1995)	Lustra (1997)

Singles from On
- 1. "Great Things" Released: 21 August 1995; 2. "King of the Kerb" Released: 23 October 1995; 3. "Dark Therapy" Released: February 1996

Professional ratings
Review scores
Source	Rating
AllMusic	4/5 stars
Entertainment Weekly	A
The Guardian	4/5 stars
NME	4/10
Q	4/5 stars
Spin	7/10

On is the second studio album by English alternative rock band Echobelly. Gaining a favourable response from critics, the album reached number 4 in the UK Albums Chart, making it their most commercially successful album. The album spawned three top-40 singles, two of which reached the top 20. On 21 July 2014, a two-CD expanded edition of the album was released with B-sides and previously unreleased live performances.

== Album title ==
The album title was inspired by a poster found by Echobelly members Glenn Johansson and Sonya Madan. The poster had the word "no" across it in blood red. By turning the word around, it became a positive, and the band took the word as the album's title.

== Track listing ==
All songs written by Sonya Madan and Glenn Johansson.

Original 1995 release

1. "Car Fiction" – 2:31
2. "King of the Kerb" – 3:59
3. "Great Things" – 3:31
4. "Natural Animal" – 3:27
5. "Go Away" – 2:44
6. "Pantyhose and Roses" – 3:25
7. "Something Hot in a Cold Country" – 4:01
8. "Four Letter Word" – 2:51
9. "Nobody Like You" – 3:52
10. "In the Year" – 3:31
11. "Dark Therapy" – 5:30
12. "Worms and Angels" – 2:38

Bonus tracks included with the 2014 reissue

13. "Here Comes the Scene" – 3:16
14. "God's Guest List" – 3:35
15. "On Turn Off" – 3:17
16. "On Turn On" – 3:18
17. "Bunty" – 2:12
18. "One After 5am" – 2:14
19. "Car Fiction" (French version) – 2:32
20. "On Turn On" (acoustic) – 3:18
21. "Natural Animal" (acoustic) – 3:45
22. "We Know Better" – 4:02
23. "Atom" – 2:49
24. "Aloha Lolita" – 3:42
- Tracks 13–18 are b-sides from "Great Things".
- Tracks 19–21 are b-sides from "King Of The Kerb".
- Tracks 22–24 are b-sides from "Dark Therapy".

Disc 2 included with the 2014 reissue

Tracks 1–13 Live at Wetalands NYC - 9 September 1995, and Tracks 14–17 from the John Peel BBC Radio One Session - 1 April 1995

1. "I Can't Imagine the World Without Me" – 3:59
2. "Car Fiction" – 2:45
3. "Close... But" – 3:12
4. "Dark Therapy" – 6:38
5. "Father Ruler King Computer" – 3:31
6. "Give Her a Gun" – 3:56
7. "Go Away" – 2:55
8. "Great Things" – 3:46
9. "Insomniac" – 3:59
10. "King of the Kerb" – 5:02
11. "Natural Animal" – 3:35
12. "Pantyhose and Roses" – 3:44
13. "Today, Tomorrow, Sometime, Never" – 3:29
14. "Four Letter Word" – 3:39
15. "Car Fiction" – 2:23
16. "Pantyhose and Roses" – 3:37
17. "Go Away" – 2:47

== Singles ==
- "Great Things" was released as the first single, and reached 13 in the UK Singles Chart.
- "King Of The Kerb" was released as the second single, and reached 25 in the UK Singles Chart.
- "Dark Therapy" was released as the third single, and reached 20 in the UK Singles Chart.

== Personnel ==
=== Echobelly ===
- Sonya Madan - vocals
- Glenn Johansson - guitar
- Debbie Smith - guitar
- Alex Keyser - bass
- Andy Henderson - drums

=== Original album and B-sides ===
- Sean Slade & Paul Kolderie - Engineers on tracks 1–21, Producers on tracks 1–18
- Echobelly - Producer on track 19–21
- Glen Johansson and Simon Vinestock - Producer on tracks 22–24
- Jim Brumby - Engineer on tracks 22–24
- Simon Vinestock - Mixer on track 11
