= Everyone's Got One =

Studio album by Echobelly
- Released: 22 August 1994
- Studio: A residential studio in Chipping Norton
- Genre: Britpop
- Length: 41:16
- Label: Rhythm King
- Producer: Simon Vinestock

Echobelly chronology
Everyone's Got One (1994)	On (1995)

Singles from Everyone's Got One
- 1. "Bellyache" Released: November 1993; 2. "Insomniac" Released: March 1994; 3. "I Can't Imagine the World Without Me" Released: June 1994; 4. "Close… But" Released: September 1994

Everyone's Got One is the debut studio album by English rock band Echobelly. Released to a favourable response from critics, the album reached number 8 in the UK Albums Chart in September 1994. On 21 July 2014, a 2CD expanded edition of the album was released by 3 Loop Music which featured B-sides and previously unreleased live material.

== Background ==
Reflecting her fascination for wordplay, lead singer Sonya Madan titled the album Everyone's Got One, with the first letter of each word spelling "EGO", a common theme throughout the album.

Madan wrote the songs "Today, Tomorrow, Sometime, Never" and "Call Me Names" about her feelings of alienation due to her Indian heritage: "Even though I have a brown skin, I didn't feel Asian. I felt alien". "Father Ruler King Computer" discusses her anger towards arranged marriages: "I was brought up, I've been told, that a husband is the goal. What connotations in these loaded words, a spinster and a bachelor, I am whole all by myself, I don't need nobody else." Other topics covered in her lyrics include empowering women ("Give Her a Gun"), self-confidence ("I Can't Imagine the World Without Me"), a friend's abortion ("Bellyache"), and loneliness ("Close… But").

== Critical reception ==
Professional ratings
Review scores
Source	Rating
AllMusic	4/5 stars
Entertainment Weekly	B+
NME	7/10
PopMatters	8/10
Vox	8/10

The Independent wrote that "it's Madan's appeal upon which the group's fortunes most heavily rest: a natural, androgyne beauty, her voice is the single most noteworthy aspect of their sound, possessing an elegant clarity bizarrely at odds with the music's darker intentions." The Guardian deemed the album "brisk Blondie-ish power-pop."

In 2017, Pitchfork placed Everyone's Got One at number 48 on their list of "The 50 Best Britpop Albums".

== Track listing ==
All tracks are written by Sonya Madan and Glenn Johansson.

No.	Title	Length
1.	"Today Tomorrow Sometime Never"	3:39
2.	"Father, Ruler, King, Computer"	2:40
3.	"Give Her a Gun"	3:37
4.	"I Can't Imagine the World Without Me"	3:00
5.	"Bellyache"	4:29
6.	"Taste of You"	3:30
7.	"Insomniac"	4:15
8.	"Call Me Names"	3:49
9.	"Close… But"	2:50
10.	"Cold Feet Warm Heart"	3:28
11.	"Scream"	5:52

Japanese edition bonus tracks
No.	Title	Length
12.	"Centipede"	4:06
13.	"Sober"	5:30

2014 reissue bonus disc
No.	Title	Length
1.	"Bellyache" (edit from "Bellyache" single)	4:59
2.	"Sleeping Hitler" (from "Bellyache" single)	4:43
3.	"Give Her a Gun" (from "Bellyache" single)	4:19
4.	"I Don't Belong Here" (from "Bellyache" single)	5:03
5.	"Centipede" (from "Insomniac" single)	4:06
6.	"Talent" (from "Insomniac" single)	2:09
7.	"Sober" (from "I Can't Imagine the World Without Me" single)	5:30
8.	"Venus Wheel" (from "I Can't Imagine the World Without Me" single)	3:14
9.	"So La Di Da" (from "Close… But" single)	4:42
10.	"I Can't Imagine a World Without Me" (live version from "Close… But" single)	3:24
11.	"Cold Feet Warm Heart" (live version from "Close… But" single)	3:39
12.	"Father Ruler King Computer" (Steve Lamacq Evening Session, BBC Radio 1, 2 February 1994)	2:38
13.	"Call Me Names" (Steve Lamacq Evening Session, BBC Radio 1, 2 February 1994)	3:51
14.	"Taste of You" (Steve Lamacq Evening Session, BBC Radio 1, 2 February 1994)	3:27
15.	"Give Her a Gun" (Steve Lamacq Evening Session, BBC Radio 1, 2 February 1994)	3:34

== Personnel ==
Credits adapted from liner notes.

Echobelly

- Sonya Madan – vocals
- Glenn Johansson – guitars, mandolin, additional vocals
- Debbie Smith – guitar
- Alex Keyser – bass, piano, whistle
- Andy Henderson – drums, percussion

Additional personnel

- Barbara Snow – trumpet ("I Can't Imagine the World Without Me")
- Lino Robinson – piano, string arrangements ("I Can't Imagine the World Without Me")
- Miles Bould – percussion ("Taste of You")
- Audrey Riley – cello ("Taste of You", "Cold Feet Warm Heart")
- Simon Vinestock – production (besides "Insomniac"), re-mixing ("Insomniac")
- Clive Martin – production, engineering ("Insomniac")
- Ronen Tal – engineering (besides "I Can't Imagine the World Without Me" and "Insomniac")
- Nick Addison – engineering ("I Can't Imagine the World Without Me")
- Alan Moulder – mixing ("I Can't Imagine the World Without Me")
- Maria Mochnacz – photography
- Stylorouge – designer

2014 reissue bonus disc

- Echobelly – performance, production (tracks 1–4, 7–8)
- Juju Midget – didgeridoo ("Bellyache")
- Huw Warren – cello ("Sleeping Hitler")
- Dick Meany – production (tracks 1–4)
- Clive Martin – production, engineering (tracks 5–6)
- Nick Addison – engineering (track 7)
- Dick Meany – mixing (track 8)
- Simon Vinestock – production (track 9)
- Sam Cunningham – production (tracks 10–11)
- Miti Adhikari – engineering (tracks 10–11)
