= Music of the Philippines =

The music of the Philippines (Filipino: Musika ng Pilipinas) includes the musical performance arts in the Philippines and the music of Filipinos composed in various local and international genres and styles. Philippine musical compositions are often a mixture of Indigenous styles, and various Asian styles, as well as Spanish/Latin American and American influences through foreign rule from those countries.

== Indigenous music ==
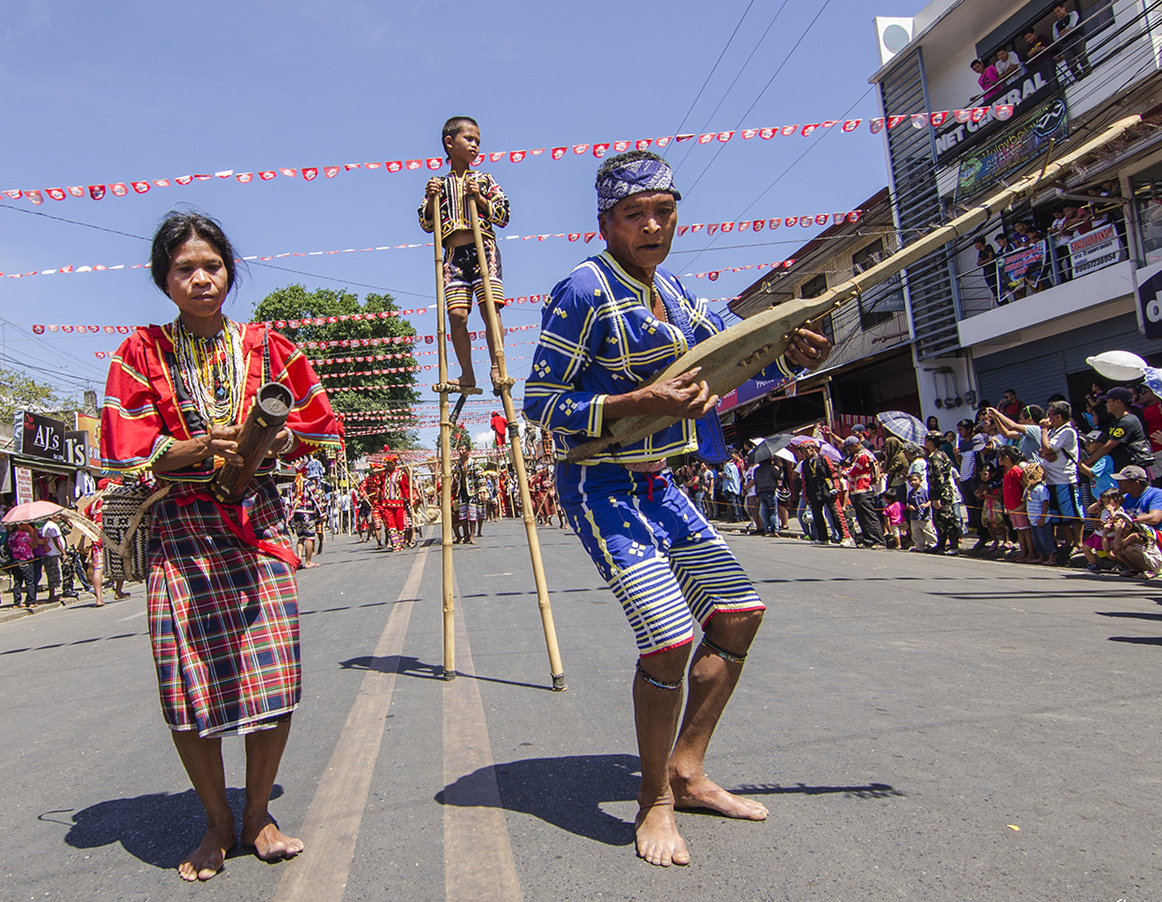
Lumad musicians playing kudyapi (right) and tube zither during the 2016 Kaamulan Festival of Bukidnon.

Notable indigenous musicians include Ukà of Lange-Lange who specialized in the kutiyapi or kudyapi, the most difficult of all indigenous Philippine instruments, Masino Intaray who specialized in the basal, aroding, and babarak, and Samaon Sulaiman, who specializes as well in the kutiyapi. Notable folk song composers include the National Artist for Music Lucio San Pedro, who composed the famous "Sa Ugoy ng Duyan" that recalls the loving touch of a mother to her child. Another composer, the National Artist for Music Antonino Buenaventura, is notable for notating folk songs and dances. Buenaventura composed the music for "Pandanggo sa Ilaw".

=== Gong music ===
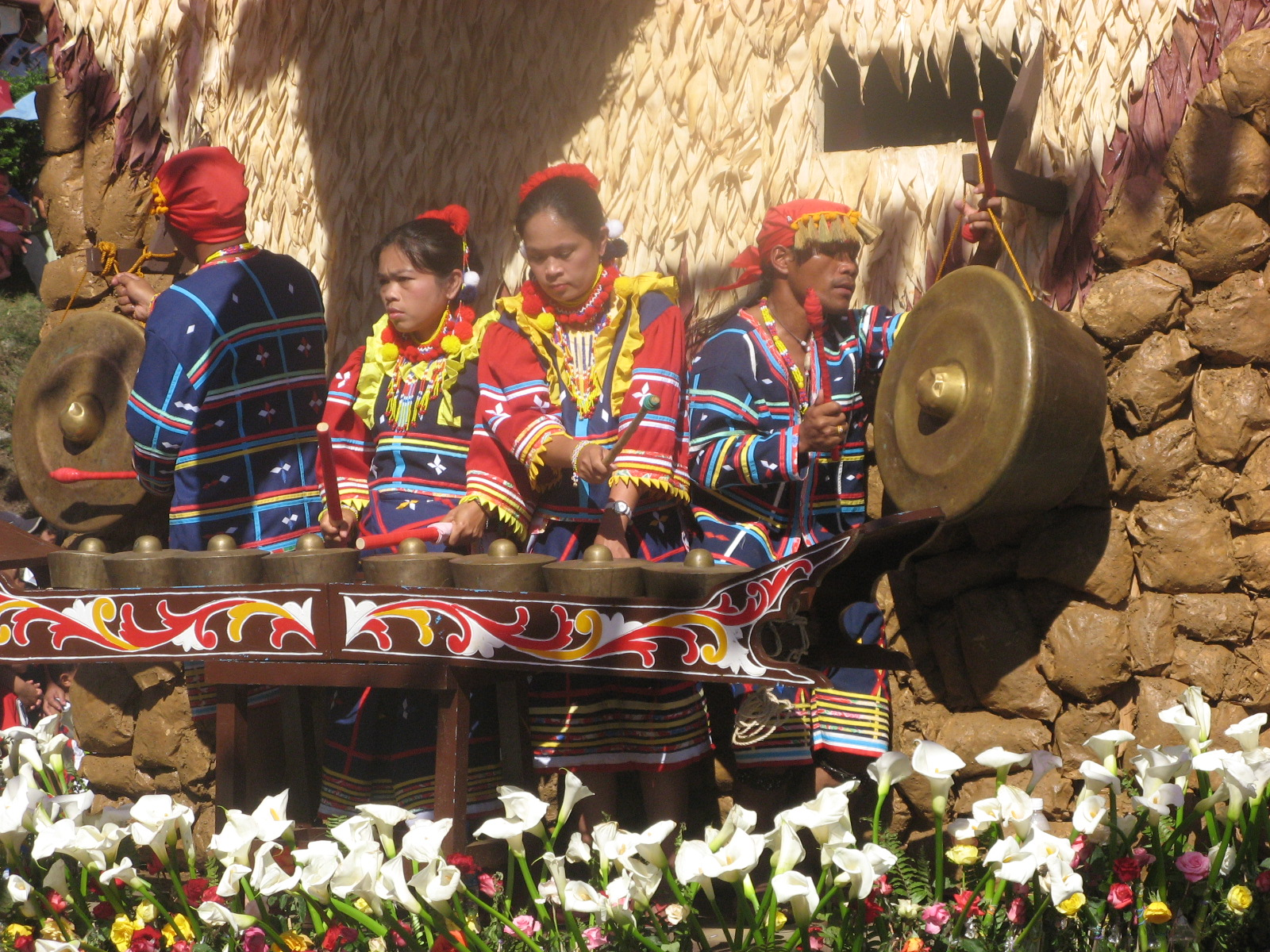
Matigsalug kulintang ensemble

Philippine gong music today can be geographically divided into two types: the flat gongs commonly known as gangsà unique to the groups in the Cordillera mountains and the bossed gongs of Muslim and animist groups spanning the Sulu archipelago, much of Mindanao, Palawan, and the inlands of Panay and Mindoro. The latter were once ubiquitous throughout coastal, lowland Philippine societies before widespread Christianization, and less frequently imports of flat chau gongs from China.

Kulintang refers to a racked gong chime instrument played in the southern islands of the Philippines, along with its varied accompanying ensembles. Different groups have different ways of playing the kulintang. Two major groups seem to stand out in kulintang music. These are the Maguindanaon and the Maranao. The kulintang instrument itself could be traced to either the introduction of gongs to Southeast Asia from China before the 9th century CE or more likely, to the introduction of bossed gong chimes from Java in the 16th century. Nevertheless, the kulintang ensemble is the most advanced form of ensemble music with origins in the pre-colonial epoch of Philippine history and is a living tradition in southern parts of the country.

The musical traditions involving the kulintang ensemble consist of regional musical styles and varying instrumentation transcending the present national borders of maritime Southeast Asia, comprising Buddhist, animist, Muslim, and Christian peoples around Borneo, lesser Sunda islands, Sulawesi, Maluku, Sulu, and Mindanao. It is distantly related to the gamelan ensembles of Java, Bali, Sumatra & the Malay peninsula, and south Borneo, even moreso the ensembles of mainland Southeast Asia, primarily because of the usage for the same racked bossed gong chimes that play melody and/or percussion

== Hispanic-influenced music ==
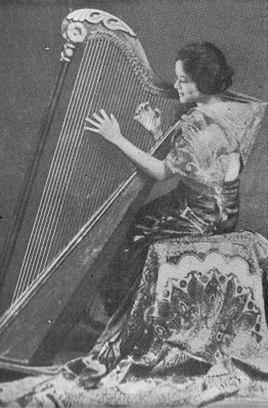
Filipina woman playing Harp which was popular in the Philippines together with Piano, Guitar, Rondalla and Organ.

Philippine folk music has some Spanish and Latin American influence, derived from the period the country, along with Guam and the Mariana islands, was ruled from Mexico City and Madrid by the Spanish viceroyalty. It is seen in folk and traditional music, of coastal lowland regions of Luzon, Visayas, and the predominantly Visayan north and east Mindanao alongside the westernmost tip of Zamboanga.

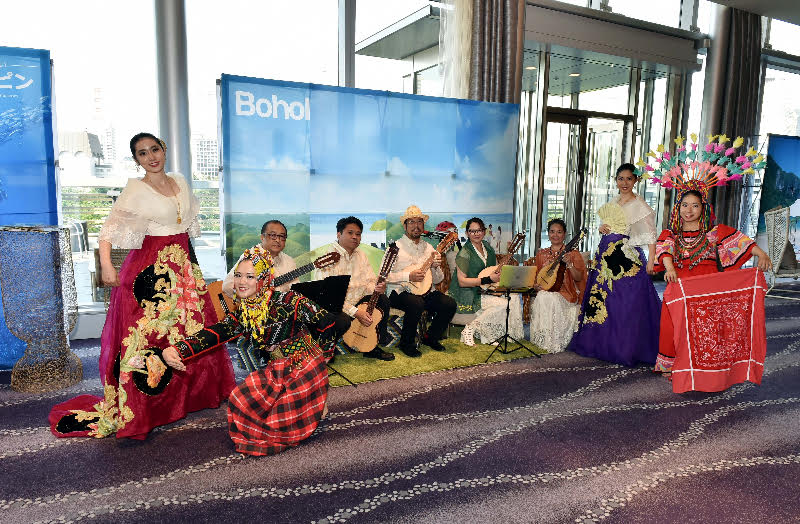
Rondalla

Hispanic music in the Philippines derived from Iberian and some Mexican traditions, owing to the Philippine colony's orientation as a distant entrepôt for resale of primarily Chinese and other Asian luxury goods across the Pacific to mainland New Spain (present-day Acapulco, Mexico). Aside from standardized genres are many precolonial musical forms syncretized with Catholic and general Hispanic idioms, typically involving in religious folk rituals. The Pasyon chants ubiquitous among Christian Filipinos preserve prehispanicized vocal styles, and invocations of patron saints throughout many towns inherited precolonial forms of ancestor and spirit worship. Examples include subli (Batangas), sinulog (Cebu), tinikling (Leyte), and bolibong kingking (Bohol).

=== Rondalla ===
The rondalla is a traditional string orchestra comprising four-string, mandolin-type instruments such as the banduria and laud; a guitar; a double bass; and often a drum for percussion. The rondalla has its origins in the Iberian rondalla tradition and is used to accompany several Hispanic-influenced song forms and dances.

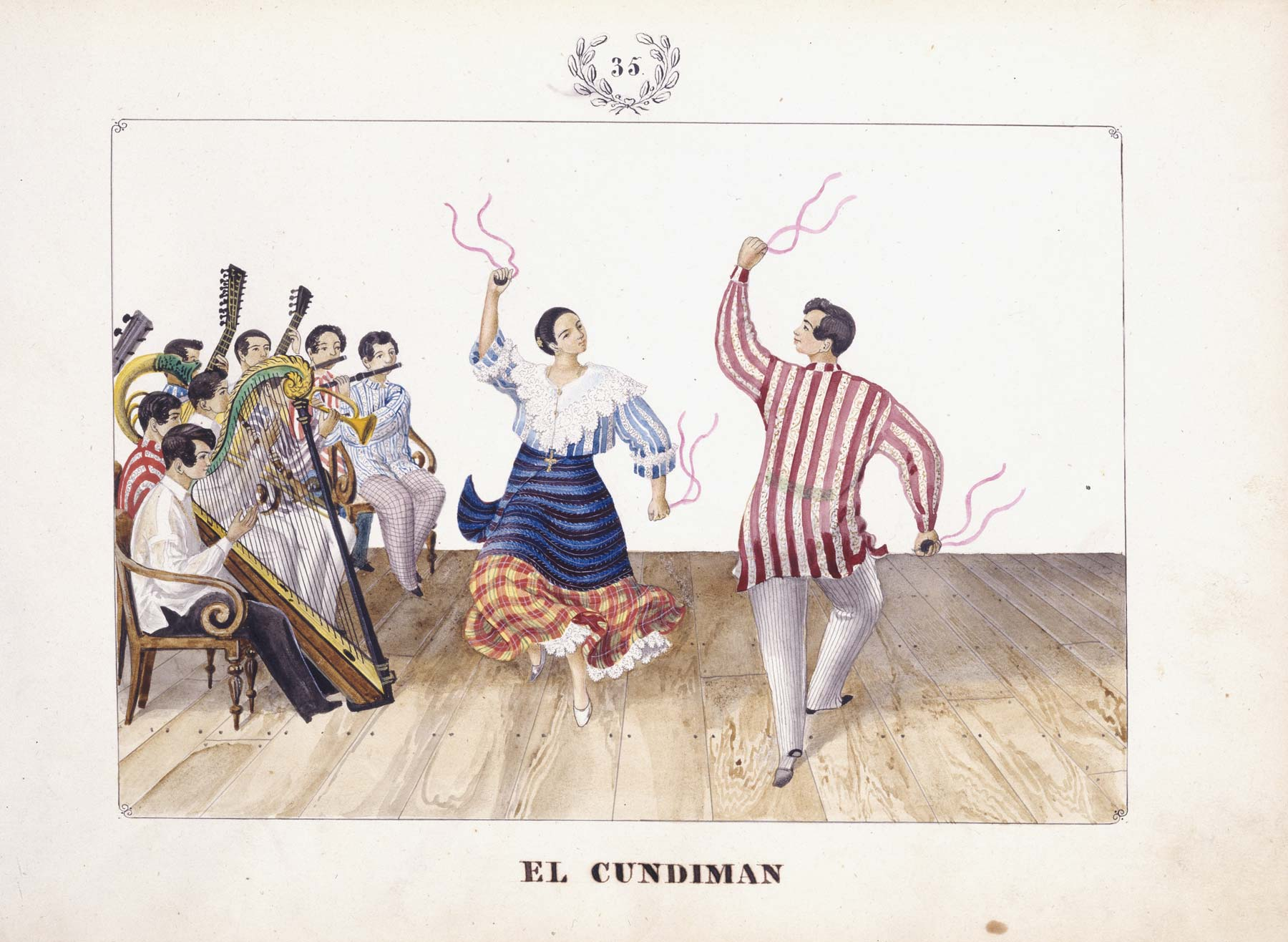
1847 depiction of the traditional Kundiman of the Philippines.

=== Harana and kundiman ===
The harana and kundiman are popular lyrical songs dating back to the Spanish period and are customarily used in courtship rituals. The harana is rooted in the Mexican-Spanish from Spain, traditional and based on the rhythmic patterns of the habanera. The kundiman, meanwhile, has precolonial origins from the Tagalophone parts of the country, uses a triple meter rhythm, and is characterized by beginning in a minor key and shifting to a major one in the second half. Harana and kundiman are stylistically different. Whereas harana is in 2/4 time, kundiman is in 3/4. The formula is verse 1 on minor key followed by verse 2 on parallel major key midway through.

In the 1920s, harana and kundiman became more mainstream after performers such as Atang de la Rama, Jovita Fuentes, Conching Rosal, Sylvia La Torre, and Ruben Tagalog introduced them to a wider audience.

== Classical music ==
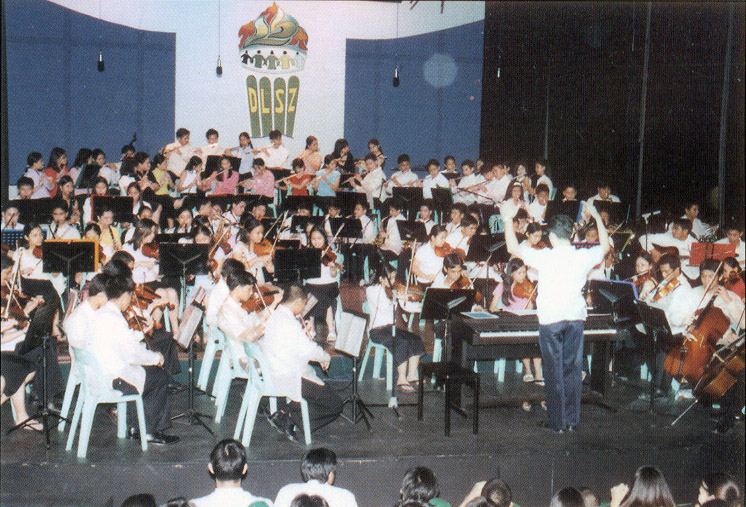
De La Salle Zobel Symphony Orchestra performing in 2004

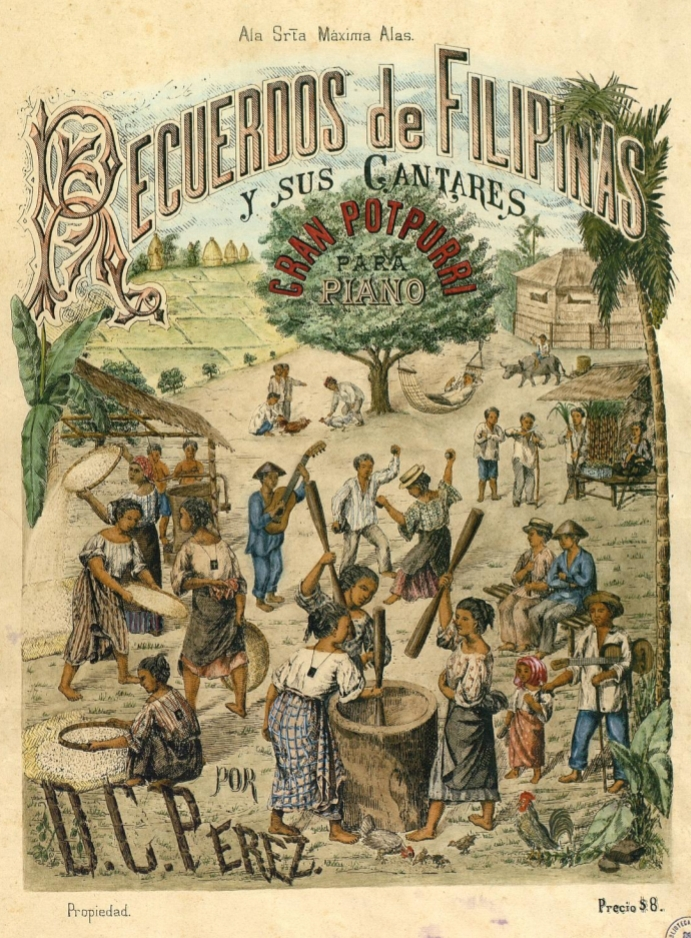
Cover of the piano piece Recuerdos de Filipinas y sus Cantares by Diego Perez (published in 1887)

Introduced during the Spanish colonial period, classical music was highly enjoyed by the wealthy elite class. Local music printing was introduced between 1870s and 1880s with music composed by Spanish peninsulars and Filipino criollos and meztizos. One of the notable piano piece printed from the 1880s is the Recuerdos de Filipinas y sus Cantares (1886) by Diego Perez. From the latter part of the 19th century, the rise of the "illustrados" or the "educated natives" began to dominate the classical music scene. Such native composers include Julián Felipe, Jose Canseco, Jr., Marcelo Adonay, Simplicio Solis, Fulgencio Tolentino, and Bonifacio Abdon. By the 1890s, tanda de valses and danzas became popular.

Most of the works of Filipino composers were heavily influenced by European composers like Ludwig van Beethoven, Frederic Chopin, and Johannes Brahms as well as the operas of Giuseppe Verdi and Gaetano Donizetti.

=== Operas and zarzuelas ===
"Ang Maya" from the zarzuela "Filipinas para los Filipinos"
Composed by Jose Estella and sung by Maria Evangelista Carpena under Victor Recording Company (1908)

By the 1880s, symphonic orchestras became prominent in Manila assisting in the performances of operas and zarzuelas. Orchestras established during this period include the Rizal Orchestra (1898) founded by Martin Ocampo with Jose Estella as its director, Oriental Orchestra by Bonifacio Abdon, the Marikina Orchestra owned by Jose Tuazon with Ladislao Bonus as a director, and the Molina Orchestra (1896) by Juan Molina.

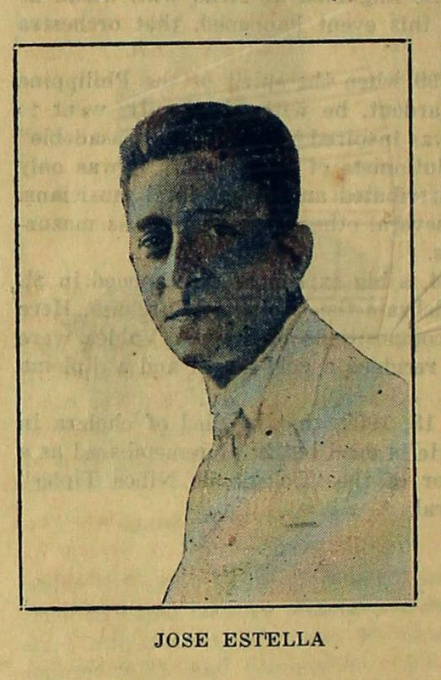
Jose Estella

The theatrical Spanish zarzuela was later adapted and localized in Philippine music. It was first introduced in 1879 and appeared in 1900. During the aftermath of the American invasion, the colonizers view the music form as "seditious" due to its use to promote nationalistic sentiments. Composers who specialized in zarzuela include Jose Estella and Bonifacio Abdon. The zarzuela is considered to be the predecessor of kundiman.

In 1902, the first Filipino opera was composed by Ladislao Bonus, Sandugong Panaginip. This was soon followed by the creation of operas by other Filipino composers such as Lakambini (1933) by Jose Estella and Magdapio by Alejo Carluen (1903).

=== Formal classical music training ===
Formal classical music training appeared during the 1900s. Because of the new public school system, music was included in the curriculum. The establishment of music conservatories and colleges were implemented for tertiary education. The earlier schools include the Scholastica's College (1906) and the University of the Philippines Conservatory of Music (1916). Most of the graduates of these schools became leading classical composers such as Franscisco Buencamino, Nicanor Abelardo, Francisco Santiago, and Antonio Molina. During the 1920s, Abelardo and Santiago began the emergence of original Filipino art music through concertos, tone poems and sonatas. In 1928, the UP Conservatory of Music produced the first Filipino symphony, Filipinas, composed by Jose Estella.

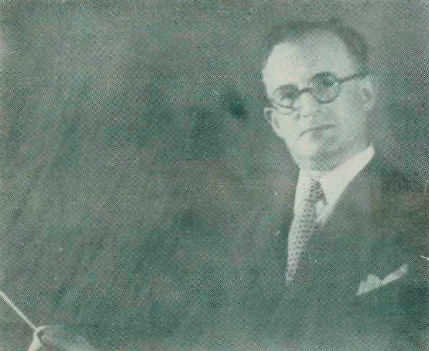
Alexander Lippay, Austrian conductor and founder of the Manila Symphony Orchestra

Centro Scholar University founded in 1907 as Centro Escolar de las Señoritas had a Music department under the direction of the famous composer Francisco Buencamino, Sr. In 1930 the department was elevated to a Conservatory of Music with Buencamino as its first director. It was at this time that the CEU Rondalla and the CEU Choir were organized. Private music schools specializing in classical music were also established in the Philippines during the 1930s such as the Academy of Music (1930) founded by Alexander Lippay and the Manila Conservatory of Music (1934) founded by Rodolfo Cornejo.

=== Contemporary period ===
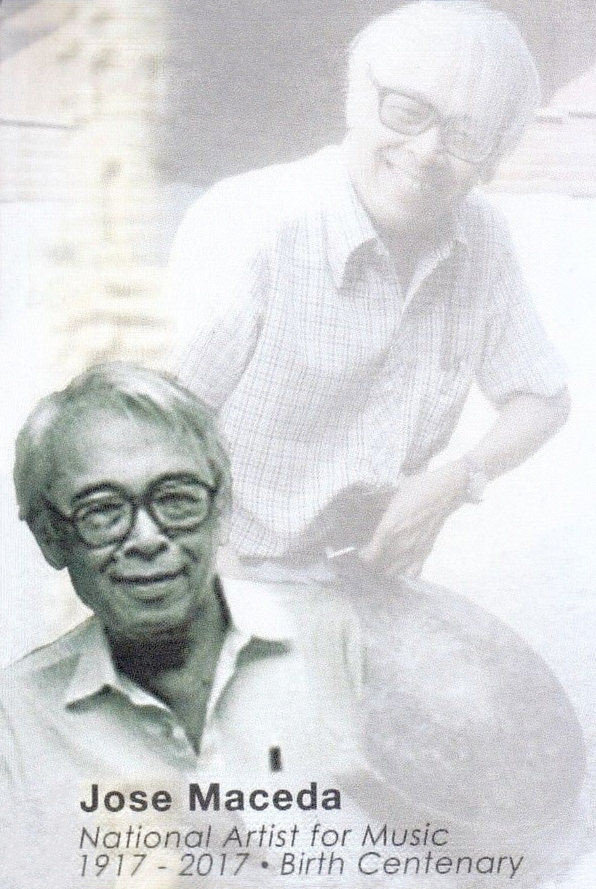
Postal stamp issued by the Philippine government featuring Jose Maceda

Inspired by American neoclassism, contemporary methods were employed by Lucrecia Kasilag and Eliseo Pajaro in their classical works. However, it was Jose Maceda that made a Filipino expressionism that is distinct from the traditional European forms of classical music.

Between the late 20th century and the 21st century, notable classical composers include Ramon Pagayon Santos and Francisco Feliciano. Groups who specialized in classical music include the Philippine Youth Orchestra, Manila Symphony Orchestra, and the UP Symphony Orchestra.

== Choral music ==
Choral music has become an important part of Philippine music culture. It dates back to the choirs of churches that sung during mass in the old days. In the middle of the 20th century, performing choral groups started to emerge and increasingly become popular as time goes by. Aside from churches, universities, schools, and local communities have established choirs.

Philippine choral arrangers like Robert Delgado, Fidel Calalang, Lucio San Pedro, Eudenice Palaruan among others have included in the vast repertoires of choirs arrangements of OPM, folk songs, patriotic songs, novelty songs, love songs, and even foreign songs.

The Philippine Madrigal Singers (originally the University of the Philippines Madrigal Singers) is one of the most famous choral groups not only in the Philippines, but also worldwide. Winning international competitions, the group became one of the most formidable choral groups in the country. Other award-winning choral groups are the University of Santo Tomas Singers, the Philippine Meistersingers (Former Adventist University of the Philippines Ambassadors), the U.P. Singing Ambassadors, and the U.P. Concert Chorus, among others.

== Popular music ==
=== Manila sound ===
Manila sound is a musical genre that began in the mid-1970s in the city of Manila. The genre flourished and peaked in the mid to late-1970s. It is often considered the "bright side" of the Philippine martial law era and has influenced most of the modern genre in the country, being the forerunner to OPM.

=== Original Pilipino Music (OPM) ===
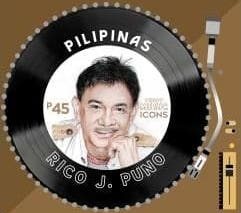
Rico J. Puno is considered as a Philippine music icon.

Original Pilipino Music, more commonly referred to as OPM, a commercial acronym coined by Danny Javier of the APO Hiking Society, originally referred only to the pop genre of music from the Philippines, predominantly ballads and novelty numbers, that became popular after the wane of its direct 1970s commercial predecessor, Manila sound. The term "OPM" became a catch-all description for all popular music of any genre composed, performed and recorded by Filipinos in the Philippines, originating from the Philippines.

Before the emergence of OPM in the 1970s, Philippine popular music through the 1950s and 1960s encompassed songs, mostly with vernacular lyrics and frequently with cinematic themes as recorded by artists such as Sylvia La Torre, Diomedes Maturan, Ric Manrique Jr., Ruben Tagalog, Helen Gamboa, Vilma Santos, Edgar Mortiz, and Carmen Camacho, among many others. There were exceptions, however, such as Pilita Corrales, dubbed Asia's Queen of Song, whose popular releases included Cebuano, Tagalog, English and Spanish adaptations. From its heyday, OPM was entrenched in Manila, as Tagalog and English stood as the dominant languages. It was also heavily influenced from American country music.

The country's first songwriting competition, Metro Manila Popular Music Festival, was first established in 1977 and launched by the Popular Music Foundation of the Philippines. The event featured many prominent singers and songwriters during its time. It was held annually for seven years until its discontinuation in 1985. It was later revived in 1996 as the "Metropop Song Festival", running for another seven years before being discontinued in 2003 due to the decline of its popularity. Another variation of the festival had been established called the Himig Handog contest which began in 2002, operated by ABS-CBN Corporation and its subsidiary music label Star Music (formerly Star Records).

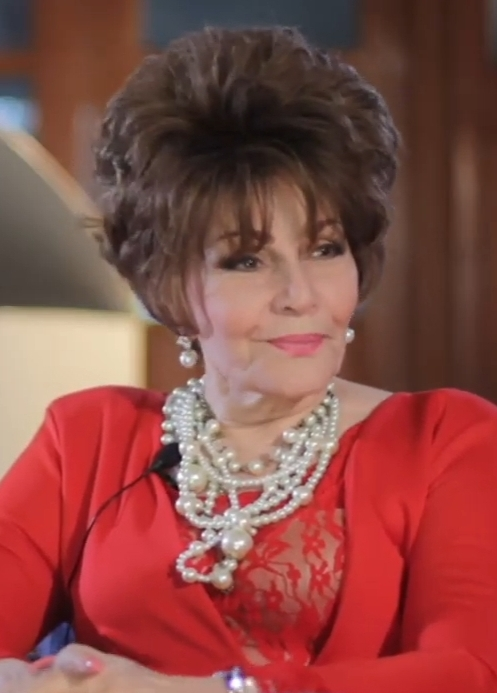
Pilita Corrales dubbed Asia's Queen of Song was also known for her Cebuano and Spanish songs

Five such competitions were staged between 2000 and 2003 and was revived in 2013. Unlike their predecessors, the contest had different themes which reflect the type of song entries chosen as finalists each year. In 2012, the Philippine Popular Music Festival was launched and is said to be inspired by the first songwriting competition. Another songwriting competition for OPM music being held annually is the Bombo Music Festival, being conducted by the radio network Bombo Radyo, first conceived in 1985.

=== OPM in other Philippine languages ===
Recording artists of other regional languages, such as Cebuano, Kapampangan, Ilocano and others languages of the Philippines rarely broke into national prominence until the 1970s and after, particularly in the emergence of Bisrock (Visayan rock music); exemplified by 1017, a Davao-based band and Maldita, a Zamboanga-based Chavacano band.

The debut music video of "Oras" ("Time") by Tarlac-based band Mernuts penetrated MTV Pilipinas, making it the first-ever Kapampangan music video to join the ranks of other mainstream Filipino music videos. RocKapampangan: The Birth of Philippine Kapampangan Rock, an album of modern remakes of Kapampangan folk extemporaneous songs by various Kapampangan bands was also launched in February 2008, and was regularly played via Kapampangan cable channel Infomax-8 and via one of Central Luzon's biggest FM radio stations, GVFM 99.1. Inspired by what the locals call "Kapampangan cultural renaissance", Angeles City-born balladeer Ronnie Liang rendered Kapampangan translations of some of his popular songs such as "Ayli" (Kapampangan version of "Ngiti"), and "Ika" (Kapampangan version of "Ikaw") for his repackaged album.

Despite the growing clamor for non-Tagalog and non-English music and the greater representation of other Philippine languages, the local Philippine music industry, which is centered in Manila, is unforthcoming in venturing investments to other locations. Some of the major reasons for this include the language barrier, small market size, and socio-cultural emphasis away from regionalism in the Philippines. An example would be the Ilokano group The Bukros Singers, who swept through Ilocandia in the 1990s and became a precursor for other Ilokano performers into the 2000s, but rarely broke through other music markets in the Philippines.

=== Philippine pop and P-pop ===
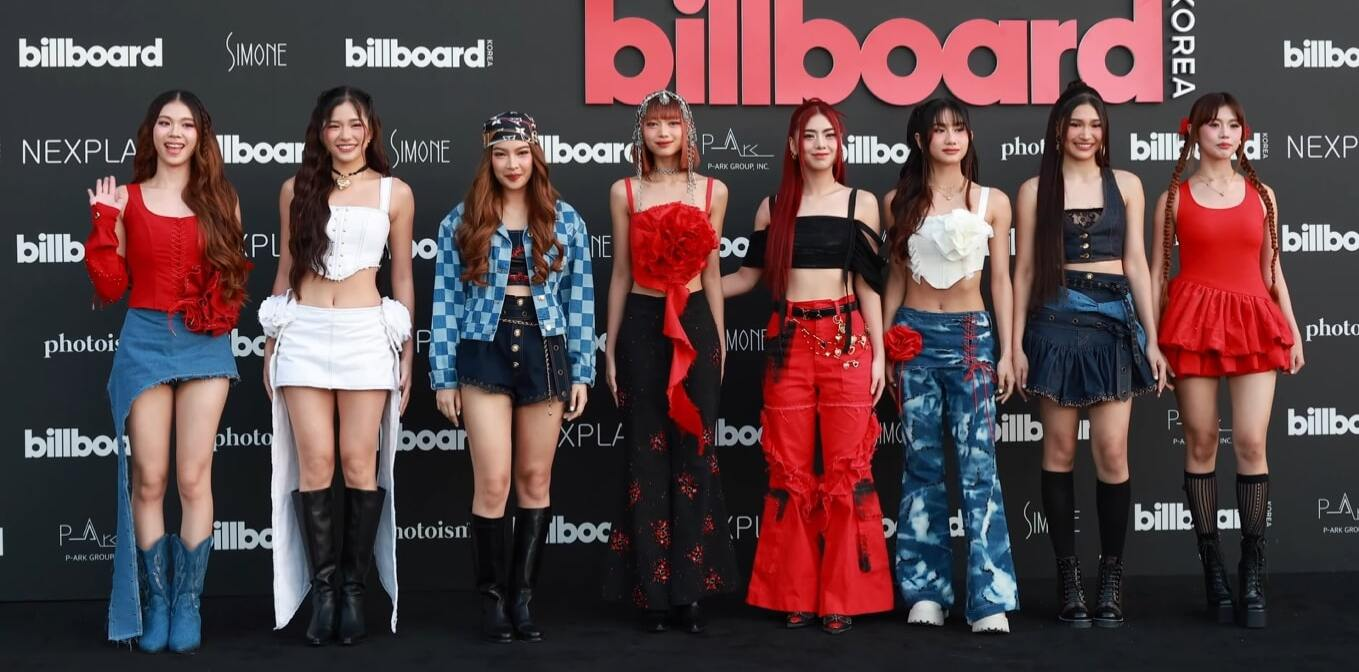
BINI - the first Filipino to win the "Best Asia Act" award at the MTV Europe Music Awards 2024.

While Filipino pop music artists have existed for decades, P-pop emerged in the 2010s with increased quality, budget, investment and variety, mirroring that of the country's rapid economic growth, and an accompanying social and cultural resurgence of its Asian identity. Heavy influence from K-pop and J-pop, Asian style ballads, idol groups, and EDM can be heard, with less reliance on Western genres, mirroring the Korean wave and similar Japanese wave popularity among young Filipinos and mainstream culture. Notable Filipino pop music artists who define the growth of this now mainstream genre include Regine Velasquez, Sarah Geronimo, Yeng Constantino, Erik Santos, KZ Tandingan, Moira Dela Torre, and Morissette, as well as P-pop bands SB19 and BINI.

== Pinoy rock ==
The United States occupied the Islands from 1898 until 1946 and introduced American blues, folk music, R&B and rock & roll which became popular. In the late 1950s, native performers adapted Tagalog lyrics for North American rock & roll music, resulting in the seminal origins of Philippine rock. The most notable achievement in Philippine rock of the 1960s was the hit song "Killer Joe", which propelled the group Rocky Fellers, reaching number 16 on the American radio charts.

=== 1970s ===
Up until the 1970s, popular rock musicians wrote and produced songs primarily in English. In the early 1970s, rock music began to be written using local languages, with bands like the Juan Dela Cruz Band being among the first popular bands to do so. Mixing Tagalog and English lyrics within the same song was also popular, an example of which includes the song "Ang Miss Universe Ng Buhay Ko ("The Miss Universe of My Life") by the band Hotdog, who was a primary innovator in the Manila sound scene. The mixing of the two languages (known as "Taglish"), while common in casual speech in the Philippines, was seen as a bold move, but the success of Taglish in popular songs, including Sharon Cuneta's first hit, "Mr. DJ", broke the barrier.

Philippine rock musicians' acts were influenced by folk music and other various cultures, helping to lead to the 1978 breakthrough success of Freddie Aguilar. Aguilar's "Anak" ("Child"), his debut recording, is the most commercially successful Filipino recording, and was popular throughout Asia and Europe, and has been translated into numerous languages by singers worldwide. Asin also broke into the music scene in the same period and was popular. Other similar artists included Sampaguita, Coritha, Florante, Mike Hanopol, and Heber Bartolome.

=== 1980s ===
Folk rock became the Philippine protest music of the 1980s, and Aguilar's rendition of "Bayan Ko" ("My Country") became popular as an anthem during the 1986 EDSA Revolution. At the same time, a counterculture rejected the rise of politically focused lyrics. In Manila, an underground Do-It-Yourself hardcore punk, punk rock scene developed, led by bands like Betrayed, the Jerks, Urban Bandits, and Contras. The influence of new wave was also felt during these years, spearheaded by the Dawn.

=== 1990s ===
The 1990s saw the emergence of Eraserheads, considered by many Filipinos as the number one Filipino musical artist. The wake of their success saw the emergence of a string of influential Filipino rock bands such as True Faith, Yano, Siakol, the Youth, Introvoys, After Image, Teeth, Parokya ni Edgar and Rivermaya, each of which mixed the influence of a variety of rock sub-genres into their style. A 1990s death metal emergence (Skychurch, Genital Grinder, Death After Birth, Disinterment, Kabaong ni Kamatayan, Mass Carnage, Apostate, Murdom, Exhumed, Sacrilege, Rumblebelly, Disinterment, Dethrone, Aroma) had bands as prominent fixtures at Club Dredd of the "tunog kalye" era.

By the 1990s, the hardcore punk scene had begun to die down in Manila. "All the punks disappeared," recalls Jep Peligro, creator of Konspirazine, a zine published in the late 1990s and early 2000s documenting the local DIY music scene. Still, there were hubs of activity, such as in Laguna, a province southeast of Manila with a rich DIY punk culture, and the neighboring Cavite region, which is jointly called Strong South known as the punk capital of the Philippines.

=== 2000s ===
Filipino rock in the 2000s also developed to include rock metal, pop, punk rock, hardcore punk, emo, hard rock, heavy metal, and alternative rock, with acts like Razorback, Wolfgang, Greyhoundz, Slapshock, Queso, Typecast, PILEDRIVER, Chicosci, Kamikazee, Bamboo, Franco, Urbandub, Tanya Markova, Kiko Machine, and the progressive bands Paradigm, Fuseboxx, Earthmover, and Eternal Now.

=== 2010s ===
The 2010s saw the rise of various unsigned acts of different subgenres from another format of rock, independent music which included indie acts such as Autotelic, Ang Bandang Shirley, the Ransom Collective, Ben&Ben, December Avenue, IV of Spades, Munimuni, and the Purplechickens among others.

Rock festivals have emerged, becoming annual events for rock and metal enthusiasts. One big event is the Pulp Summer Slam where local rock/metal bands and international bands such as Lamb of God, Anthrax, Death Angel, and Arch Enemy have performed. Another all-local annual event, Rakrakan Festival, is one where over 100 Pinoy rock acts perform.

The neo-traditional genre in Filipino music is also gaining popularity, with artists such as Joey Ayala, Grace Nono, Bayang Barrios, Kadangyan, and Pinikpikan reaping relative commercial success while utilizing the traditional musical sounds of Indigenous peoples in the Philippines.

=== 2020s ===
The 2020s gave birth of new breed of rock and indie artists/bands: Magnus Haven, Bandang Lapis, the Vowels They Orbit and Nobita. Zild Benitez, who previously played for IV of Spades, also made his solo recordings.

== Pinoy jazz ==
=== Early jazz by Filipinos ===
Malayan (Foxtrot)
Composed by Francisco Santiago and performed by the Victor Band conducted by Rosario Bourdon (recorded under Victor Recording Company in 1920).

Jazz music in the Philippines originated during the American occupation of the Philippines between 1910s and 1920s. At this period, Filipinos began experimenting with Afro-American and Hispano-Filipino music. One of the notable musicians of this age was the self-proclaimed "King of Jazz", Luis Borromeo. The music produced by Borromeo was ragtime which was common among his contemporaries. Other composers such as classical composers like Francisco Santiago and Jose Estella began fusing jazz elements, which was considered "modern music" at the time, and created new genres of dance music such as "himno one-step", "Filipino foxtrot", and "‘Filipino tango-foxtrots". During the 1920s, with the arrival of recording companies such as Parlophone and with the gained momentum of the aforementioned hybrid dance genres, many department stores and shopping streets especially at Escolta, Manila began selling and advertising for new "Filipino Dance Records". Furthermore, the original compositions of Filipino bassist Angel Peña in the 1950s became a catalyst for the Jazz Friends to converge, consisting of alto saxophonist Lito Molina, pianist Emil Mijares, drummer Tony Velarde and other jazz orchestra professionals.

=== Adobo Jazz ===
According to the Filipinas Heritage Library, Pinoy jazz became a unique genre because it mixed Filipino folk music elements with the emerging modern jazz trends of the '70s and onwards, with the JEM Records albums of Eddie Munji and Ryan Cayabyab music in the mid-1970s. A renewed interest in their recordings caused a resurgence of Pinoy jazz, reinvented as Adobo Jazz in the late 1990s and after. The initial impetus was provided by groups such as JRCOBB Jazz Chamber; and bands such as WDOUJI (acronym: Witch Doctors of Underground Jazz Improvization) that released an award-winning album in 2002 entitled Ground Zero (under the now-defunct N/A Records label); and Buhay (under the now-defunct Star Records label), led by saxophonist Tots Tolentino. After-hours jazz jams became a norm in venues such as Freedom Bar (located along Anonas Street in Cubao, Quezon City) during the early 2000s; and Tago Jazz Cafe in the 2010s, (also located in Cubao) that became incubators for emerging jazz groups and recording talent.

Pinoy jazz paved the way for post-modern innovations, most notably the Filipino jazz supergroup Johnny Alegre Affinity, releasing its eponymous debut album in 2005 under the UK-based Candid Records. Other notables were guitarist Bob Aves with his ethno-infused jazz recordings, and the spoken-word fusion ensemble Radioactive Sago Project also displayed jazz underpinnings. The Kapampangan singer Mon David likewise cultivated his persona as a Filipino jazz vocalist to win the London International Jazz Competition for Vocalists in 2006. Among the female jazz singer-songwriters, the British-Filipino Mishka Adams became very popular as a flagship artist of Candid Records, releasing two well-received albums. The multi-awarded music of Humanfolk in the new millennium became a cause for fusing genuine indigenous music rhythms and instrumentation with urban folk music and jazz harmonization.

== Other genres ==
Many other genres are growing in popularity in the Philippine music scene, including several alternative groups and tribal bands promoting cultural awareness in the Philippines.

=== Hip hop ===
Filipino hip-hop is hip hop music performed by musicians of Filipino descent, both in the Philippines and overseas, especially by Filipino-Americans. The Philippines is known to have the first hip-hop music scene in Asia, emerging in the early 1980s, largely due to the country's historical connections with the United States where hip-hop originated. Rap music released in the Philippines has appeared in different languages such as Tagalog, Chavacano, Cebuano, Ilocano, and English. In the Philippines, Francis M, Andrew E., Vincent Daffalong, Michael V., Denmark, and Gloc-9 are cited as the most influential rappers in the country, being the first to release mainstream rap albums. A new breed of hip hop/rap/trap artists like Abra, Bassilyo, Curse 1, Flict-G, Smugglaz, Dello, Loonie, Shehyee, Shanti Dope, 1096 Gang, Al James, Because, Bugoy na Koykoy, Nik Makino, Honcho, Uncle Dags, HELLMERRY, RAPROJECT SIX, Skusta Clee, Flow G, Ex Battalion, ALLMO$T, O.C. Dawgs and Ez Mil would later follow in the early 2010s to present.

=== Novelty pop ===
Pinoy novelty songs became popular in the 1970s up to the early 1980s. Popular novelty singers around this time were Reycard Duet, Fred Panopio and Yoyoy Villame. Novelty pop acts in the 1990s and 2000s included Michael V., Bayani Agbayani, Grin Department, Masculados ("Lagot Ka!"), Blakdyak, Vhong Navarro, Lito Camo, Sexbomb Girls ("Bakit Papa", "Spageti Song"), Joey de Leon ("Itaktak Mo"), Viva Hot Babes, and Willie Revillame.

=== Latin and bossa-nova ===
Afro-Cuban a.k.a. "latin and bossa-nova rhythms in Philippine popular music became pervasive through the Philippines' post-Liberation years and onwards. Performers such as Annie Brazil and her son Richard Merk, the Katindig family of musicians (Eddie Katindig, Romy Katindig, Boy Katindig, Henry Katindig and Tating Katindig), Bo Razon, Eileen Sison and Sitti, achieved popularity and commercial success with latin and bossa-nova inflected live performances and recordings.

=== Reggae ===
While there has long been an underground reggae and ska scene, particularly in Baguio, it was only recently that such genres were accepted into the mainstream scene. Acts like Tropical Depression, Brownman Revival, Put3ska, Roots Revival of Cebu, and the Brown Outfit Bureau of Tarlac City have been instrumental in popularizing what is called "Island Riddims". There is also a burgeoning mod revival, spearheaded by Juan Pablo Dream and a large indie-pop scene.

=== Electronica and ambient ===
Electronic music began in the mid-1990s in the Manila underground spearheaded by such acts as Manolet Dario of the Consortium. In 2010, local artists started to create electropop songs themselves. As of now, most electronic songs are used in commercials. The only radio station so far that purely plays electronic music is 107.9 U Radio. The 2010s also saw the rise of budots, popularly known as "bombtech" from Davao City, regarded as the first "Filipino-fied" EDM, as well as high-profile nightclub venues such as The Palace Manila (a collective group of hosted bars/nightclubs in Uptown Bonifacio in BGC, Taguig; co-founded by Embassy Superclub owner Erik Cua and co-owners/partners including Tim Yap, Erwan Heussaff and Raymond Gutierrez among others) and Cove Manila (Okada Manila in Parañaque). Indie electronic producers, DJs, and artists like that of Somedaydream, Borhuh, Kidwolf, Zelijah, John Sedano, MVRXX, MRKIII (now Aloura), Bojam, CRWN, NINNO, Kidthrones, and Jess Connelly have also gained popularity. Some mainstream club DJs, including the likes of Ace Ramos, Mars Miranda, Marc Marasigan, Martin Pulgar, Katsy Lee, Patty Tiu, and David Ardiente, has also made their names on popular club concerts and festivals which featured international DJs. Ato Mariano, an adherent of what he describes as "earth music", released a digital album containing sound samples of indigenous instruments that included various percussion.

=== Bangsamoro pop ===
Centered in Maguindanao del Norte, Maguindanao del Sur and Soccsksargen, an underground pop music scene known as Bangsamoro pop (B-pop; also called Moropop) emerged in the late 2000s, gaining local radio listeners and fans in the area, but also attracted some worldwide following among Maguindanaon diaspora thanks to YouTube. Notable B-pop artists include Datu Khomeini Camsa Bansuan (dubbed as the "King of Moro Songs"), Tamtax, Shaira (dubbed as the "Queen of Bangsamoro Pop", known for her song "Selos"), and Johnson Ampatuan, among others who perform in such venues as barangay basketball courts, residential neighborhoods, birthday or wedding parties and even remotest areas such as forest villages rather than clubs. Similar to a dangdut music scene in Indonesia, the genre's lyrics are mainly written in both Maguindanaon and Tagalog, and has influences from other genres, especially EDM. Because Bangsamoro is a Muslim-populated region in the Philippines, female Bangsamoro pop artists often faced criticisms from ultra-conservative Muslim communities in the region especially from its religious scholars called ulamas, for showing sexual forms of dance such as twerking onstage and for wearing just shirts and jeans (even torn jeans) performing on public, instead of including hijab and abaya, concerning religious morality.

== Music as protest in the Philippines ==
The Philippines has had a long history of songs associated with associated with protest and social change, dating back to the days of the Philippine Revolution, during which important protest music included patriotic marches and the traditional Filipino kundiman. One of the most notable examples of protest songs from this early period were Julián Felipe's 1898 composition "Marcha Nacional Filipina", which was combined with José Palma's 1899 poem "Filipinas" to create Lupang Hinirang, now the Philippines' official National anthem. Another song that nearly became the Philippines' national anthem was Julio Nakpil's 1896 composition Marangal na Dalit ng Katagalugan (Honorable Hymn of the Tagalog Nation/People) which was commissioned by Andres Bonifacio as the anthem of the revolutionary Tagalog Republic.

The song Bayan Ko was an important protest song from the American Occupation period, with the Tagalog version composed in 1929 by Constancio de Guzmán with lyrics attributed to José Corazón de Jesús based on a Spanish piece attributed to Propaganda Movement hero José Alejandrino. It was later banned by Marcos when it was deemed seditious under Martial Law, but it became an important rallying cry when protesters chose to sing it at funeral after the 1983 Assassination of Ninoy Aquino.

The use of music as protest became more widespread and began to incorporate popular, folk, and rock music during the years of the Marcos dictatorship, especially after the human rights abuses that came after the 1972 proclamation of Martial Law. The trend towards the popular use of music as protest continued until Marcos was deposed during the 1986 People Power revolution, after which the use of songs as protest or as a means of advocating social change became a constant feature of Filipino musical culture.

== See also ==
- Adobo Jazz (anthology series)
- Rondalla
- List of Philippine-based music groups
- List of Philippine films of the 1930s
- Manila sound
- Pinoy hip hop
- Pinoy pop
- Pinoy reggae
- Pinoy rock
- P-pop movement

== Sources ==
- Clewley, John (2000). "Pinoy Rockers". In Broughton, Simon; Ellingham, Mark (eds.). World Music: The Rough Guide. Vol. 2: Latin & North America, Caribbean, India, Asia and Pacific. London: Rough Guides. pp. 213–217. ISBN 1-85828-636-0.
