= Johnny Alegre Affinity =

Filipino jazz ensemble

Johnny Alegre AFFINITY
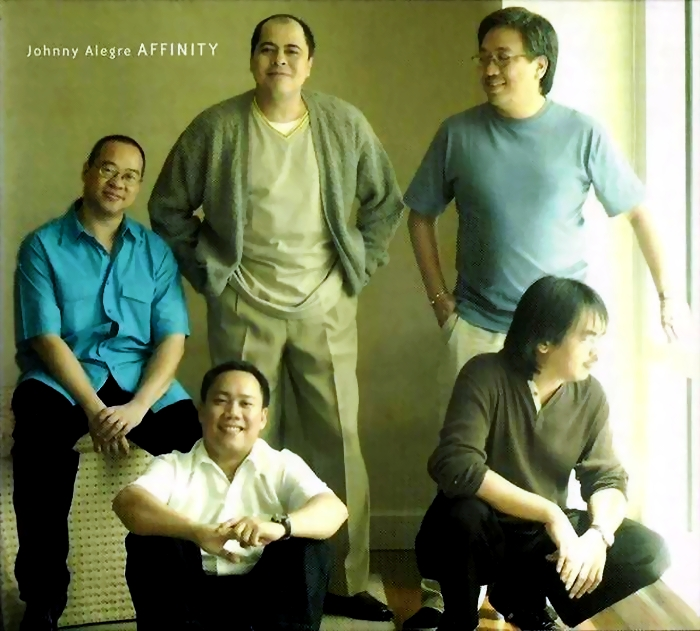
- Founding members, from left to right: (seated) Tots Tolentino, (standing) Johnny Alegre and Colby de la Calzada, (foreground) Elhmir Saison and Koko Bermejo

Background information
- Origin: Philippines
- Genres: Jazz
- Years active: 2002 - present
- Labels: Candid Records (UK); MCA
- Members: Johnny Alegre (guitar), Colby dela Calzada (bass), Elhmir Saison (piano)
- Past members: Koko Bermejo (drums), Tots Tolentino (sax), Simon Tan (contrabass), Ria Osorio (keyboards/orchestration)
- Website: johnnyalegre.com

The Johnny Alegre AFFINITY is a jazz group originating from the Philippines. It is led by self-taught Philippine guitarist-composer Johnny Alegre, together with bassist Colby de la Calzada, drummer Koko Bermejo, pianist Elhmir Saison and saxophonist Tots Tolentino. The ensemble first gathered in May 2002 at Manila’s Pink Noise Studios for Alegre’s composition, “Stones of Intramuros”, for inclusion in the jazz anthology CD, Adobo Jazz: A Portrait of the Filipino as a Jazz Artist, Vol. 1, and thereafter carried on as a working unit.

The band's first public appearance in October of the same year for the Adobo Jazz album launch at the Monk's Dream Jazz Bar heralded the AFFINITY's reputation – as described by aficionados in the ensuing reviews — as “Manila’s Jazz Superband”, with a power trio at its core. For the remainder of the year, the group emerged in various guises and personnel variations, composed of a who's who of luminaries from the Philippine jazz scene.

In 2003, the original quintet that recorded “Stones of Intramuros” returned to the studio to record new compositions by Alegre; followed by a succession of other dates leading to the release of the eponymous album, Johnny Alegre AFFINITY, renamed Jazzhound, by the London-based jazz specialty label, Candid Records (UK).

The band was prominently featured at the annual Fête de la Musique and the Korg Music Festival. In November, the Johnny Alegre AFFINITY inaugurated their new compositions and arrangements before an enthusiastic jazz audience at the University of the Philippines Theatre, which was subsequently broadcast, live, on prime time over national television. This national debut performance was also issued as a DVD by the sponsoring Upsilon Sigma Phi fraternity and had since been included in a historical documentary of Philippine Jazz, issued by the Jazz Society of the Philippines. In 2004, AFFINITY once again became the focal point of two major jazz concert events, the Makati Jazz Festival celebrating its Foundation Day; and the 2nd Manila Jazz Festival.

In 2005, through critical support matched by impressive album sales, Candid Records ushered the Manila “jazz superband” through a tour of stellar performances (highlighted by a formal launch at the famed Ayala Museum), capped by two groundbreaking performances at London's PizzaExpress Jazz Club. Their repeat performance in the 3rd Manila Jazz Festival was subsequently issued as a DVD by the Jewelmer Corporation. A new Candid Records release, entitled Eastern Skies, was launched in December 2007 featuring AFFINITY amidst big band and symphonic arrangements by orchestrator Ria Osorio featuring the music of Johnny Alegre with the Global Studio Orchestra, conducted by Gerard Salonga.

== Nominations ==
Year	PARI	Venue	Category	Nominated work	Results
2005	18th Awit Awards	AFP Theater	Best Jazz Album	Johnny Alegre AFFINITY	Nominated
2008	21st Awit Awards	Eastwood Central Plaza	Best Jazz Recording	Beacon Call	Nominated

== Awards ==
Conferred on Johnny Alegre as leader

Year	Award Giving Body	Venue	Award
2006	WWF Philippines	Ayala Tower One	Award Of Excellence for Exemplary Musicianship of "For A Living Planet"
2013	8th Philippine International Jazz and Arts Festival	Sofitel Philippine Plaza Manila	Icon Award
2014	Aliw Awards	Newport Performing Arts Theater	Best Instrumentalist

== Discography ==
Album	Catalog/UPC No.	Label	Year
Stones of Intramuros (single) Track 9 Adobo Jazz: A Portrait of the Filipino as a Jazz Artist, Vol. 1		IndiRa Records	2002
Johnny Alegre AFFINITY	CAN-KC-5001	Candid	2005
Jazzhound (UK release)	CCD-79842	Candid	2005
Jazzhound (radio edit, single) Track 4 ENVIRONMENTALLY SOUND: A Select Anthology of Songs Inspired by the Earth		WWF	2006
Eastern Skies	CAN-KC-5006	Candid	2007
Stories	UPC:00602537694600	MCA	2014
Johnny Alegre AFFINITY (2LP)	JAA-001-BR	Backspacer Records	2022

== Videography ==
Title	Musicians	Director	Producer	Genre	Year	Country
Jazz in Time: Commemorative Concert XII	Johnny Alegre, guitar ♦ Colby dela Calzada, contrabass ♦ Koko Bermejo, drums ♦ Elhmir Saison, piano ♦ Tots Tolentino, alto sax	Fritz Ynfante	Upsilon Sigma Phi	jazz concert	2003	Philippines
Jazzhound official music video	Johnny Alegre, guitar ♦ Colby dela Calzada, contrabass ♦ Koko Bermejo, drums ♦ Elhmir Saison, piano ♦ Tots Tolentino, alto sax	Fritz Ynfante (concert footage); Wilfred Galila (video montage)	Mowelfund; PH AFFINITY Productions	music video	2005	Philippines
3rd Manila Jazz Festival	Johnny Alegre, guitar ♦ Simon Tan, contrabass ♦ Koko Bermejo, drums ♦ Elhmir Saison, piano ♦ Tots Tolentino, alto sax	Angela Poblador	Jewelmer International Corporation	jazz concert	2005	Philippines
Pinoy Jazz: The Story of Jazz in the Philippines	Johnny Alegre, guitar ♦ Colby dela Calzada, contrabass ♦ Koko Bermejo, drums ♦ Elhmir Saison, piano ♦ Tots Tolentino, alto sax	Collis Davis	Richie Quirino, Collis Davis	documentary	2006	Philippines
Fête de la Musique 2011	Johnny Alegre, guitar ♦ Colby dela Calzada, electric bass ♦ Mar Dizon, drums	Franz Lawrence Tan	Fête de la Musique	jazz concert	2011	Philippines
Tiendesitas Super Jazz Weekend	Johnny Alegre, guitar ♦ Yuna Reguerra, electric bass ♦ Wendell Garcia, drums ♦ Elhmir Saison, keyboards	Dondi Santos	Tiendesitas	jazz concert	2014	Philippines
Beacon Call	Johnny Alegre, guitar ♦ Colby dela Calzada, contrabass ♦ Koko Bermejo, drums ♦ Joey Quirino, piano ♦ Ria Villena-Osorio, orchestration ♦ Gerard Salonga, conductor	MCA Music Philippines	PH AFFINITY Productions	sampler	2014	Philippines
