= Tots Tolentino =

Jazz saxophonist, flautist and improviser

- Born: Mario Martin Allid Tolentino; July 2, 1959 (age 66)
- Genres: jazz, pop
- Occupations: Musical artist, session musician, arranger
- Instruments: saxophone (tenor, alto, and soprano sax), flute, clarinet, penny whistle
- Years active: 1984-present
- Labels: Blackgold Records; Dypro Records; Saturno Records; Jesuit Communications Foundation
- Education: Magna cum laude - Berklee College of Music
- Alma mater: University of the Philippines and Berklee College of Music
- Occupation: Educator in university
- Employer: University of Santo Tomas
- Organization: Asosasyon ng Musikong Pilipino (AMP)
- Relatives: Sen. Arturo Tolentino (grandfather)

Tots Tolentino (born on July 2, 1959) is a jazz musician from the Philippines.

== Biography ==
Tots Tolentino's interest in jazz began at age 16 upon hearing recordings by Charlie Parker. In 1977, he enrolled at the University of the Philippines Conservatory of Music where he studied flute under Prof. Eric Barcelo and played with the U.P. Jazz Ensemble, switching to saxophone. He afterwards enrolled at the Berklee College of Music in Boston, Massachusetts, under the tutelage of Joseph "Joe" Viola where he graduated magna cum laude in 1982. His professional career as a first-call session musician in the Philippine recording industry culminated in his own first album in 1990.

=== Albums ===
Tots Tolentino has five solo albums to date, namely the self-titled Tots Tolentino (1990) and Inah (1991), both under Blackgold Records; and Color Real (1993) with Dypro Records. In 2012 he released a Christmas album entitled Tots Tolentino Plays Vehnee Saturno Christmas Songs. In 2015, he released another Christmas album under the Jesuit Communications Foundation, called God Rest Ye! (Christmas Jazz with Tots Tolentino).

=== Bands ===
In the early 90s, Tots Tolentino fronted the group Buhay, a band composed of Pinoy jazz musicians Wowee Posadas (keyboards), Mar Dizon (drums), Meong Pacana (bass), and Tots Tolentino.

In the mid-1990s, he was in invited by the famed trumpeter Terumasa Hino to join the Asian Jazz All-Stars Power Quartet, a jazz group featuring four of Asia's prominent jazz musicians, namely pianist/organist Jeremy Monteiro from Singapore, guitarist Eugene Pao from Hong Kong, drummer Hong Chanutr Techatana-nan from Thailand, and saxophonist Tots Tolentino from the Philippines.

Tots joined Johnny Alegre AFFINITY in 2002, a Manila-based jazz group with frontman Johnny Alegre (guitar), Colby de la Calzada (contrabass), Elhmir Saison (piano), and Koko Bermejo (drums). Johnny Alegre AFFINITY released several albums which were nominated for awards.

He was one of the founders and principal soloists of a large ensemble called The AMP Band, consisting of members from the Asosasyon ng Musikong Pilipino, hence its name.

=== Adobo Jazz ===
Tolentino participated in ensembles featured in the Adobo Jazz series of Pinoy Jazz anthology albums.

- Bobby Enriquez All-Star Band, featuring Bobby Enriquez (piano) Emil Mijares (vibraphone) Nestor Gonzaga (trumpet) Abel Valdevia (alto sax) Tots Tolentino (tenor sax) Pikoy Villapando (baritone sax) Narding Sanchez (trombone) Roger Herrera (bass) Tony Velarde (drums) Nick Boogie (percussion)
- Johnny Alegre AFFINITY, featuring Johnny Alegre (guitar), Tots Tolentino (alto sax), Elhmir Saison (piano), Colby dela Calzada (bass), and Koko Bermejo (drums)
- Monk's Jazz Bureau, featuring Terry Undag (trumpet), Tots Tolentino (alto sax), Marc Lopez (piano), Colby dela Calzada (bass), and George San Jose (drums)
- ETS Band, featuring Elhmir Saison (keyboards), Tots Tolentino (clarinet), Janno Queyquep (guitar), Noel Asistores (bass), Mar Dizon (drums), and Wilson Matias (2nd keyboards)

== Advocacy ==
Tots Tolentino helped organize the Asosasyon ng Musikong Pilipino (trans: Association of Filipino Musicians). to professionalize Filipino musicians wages, contracts and render financial assistance, legal counsel and coordination with government agencies.

== Academe ==
Tots joined the faculty of the University of Santo Tomas Conservatory of Music (UST Music) and is presently the head of its Jazz Studies program and the conductor of the UST Jazz Ensemble. The Filipino Music Art Collective lists Tots Tolentino as one of their mentors.

== Discography ==
=== Solo albums ===
Year	Album title	Artist	Label	Catalog/Barcode	Genre	Format
1990	Tots Tolentino	Tots Tolentino	Blackgold Records	BA-5166	Crossover Jazz	LP
1991	Inah	Tots Tolentino	Blackgold Records	KBA-5203	Crossover Jazz	Cassette
1993	Color Real	Tots Tolentino	Dypro Records	86/91	Pop/Rock	CD
2012	Tots Tolentino Plays Vehnee Saturno Christmas Songs	Tots Tolentino	Saturno Records		Christmas	CD
2015	God Rest Ye! (Christmas Jazz with Tots Tolentino)	Tots Tolentino	Jesuit Communications Foundation		Christmas	CD

=== Compilation albums ===
Year	Single/Album	Artist	Label	Catalog/Barcode	Genre	Format
2002	Adobo Jazz: A Portrait of the Filipino as a Jazz Artist, Vol. 1 (two recordings with two different bands)	Johnny Alegre AFFINITY Monk's Jazz Bureau	IndiRa Records		Jazz	Compilation CD
2002	Adobo Jazz, Vol. 2	The Bobby Enriquez All-Star Band	IndiRa Records		Jazz	Compilation CD
2012	A Bossa Nova Love Affair	Various Artists	Candid Records	CCD 71805	Jazz	Compilation CD
2019	Adobo Jazz: Filipino Jazz Music of Our Time, Vol. 1	ETS Band	Bowfinger Records		Jazz	Compilation CD

=== Group albums ===
Year	Album title	Artist	Label	Catalog/Barcode	Genre	Format
2000	Inner Country	Bob Aves Group	BMG		World Jazz	CD
2005	Johnny Alegre AFFINITY	Johnny Alegre AFFINITY	Candid Records Philippines	CAN-KC-5001	Jazz	CD
2005	Jazzhound	Johnny Alegre AFFINITY	Candid Records	CCD 79842	Jazz	CD
2007	Eastern Skies	Johnny Alegre AFFINITY	Candid Records Philippines	CAN-KC-5006	Jazz	CD
2011	Live At The Living Room Jazz Festival, Bangkok	Asian Jazz All-Stars Power Quartet	Jazznote Records		Jazz	CD
2014	Stories	Johnny Alegre AFFINITY	MCA Music (Philippines)	UPC:00602537694600	Jazz	CD
2022	Johnny Alegre AFFINITY	Johnny Alegre AFFINITY	Backspacer Records	JAA-001-BR	Jazz	Vinyl

=== Session work ===
Year	Single/Album	Artist	Label	Catalog/Barcode	Genre	Format
1976	Pamasko	The New Minstrels	RJV Records	R-5001	Christmas	LP
1990	Thaddea	Rudy Lozano	Ivory Records	463	Jazz	Cassette
1991	A New Start	Martin Nievera	Dyna Music		Easy Listening	CD
1994	Roads	Martin Nievera	Polycosmic Records	DST-92-243	Easy Listening	CD
1996	Another Chance	Janno Gibbs	Polycosmic Records	92-264	Pop/Rock	CD
1998	In Love	Lea Salonga	BMG	1	Vocal	CD
1999	Aawitan Ko Na Lang	Ariel Rivera	Musiko	117	Pop/Rock	CD
1999	Forever, Forever	Martin Nievera	EMI / PolyEast Records	547619	Easy Listening	CD
1999	Louie O.	Louie Ocampo	Musiko / BMG	MRMC 128	New Age	CD
1999	Papa's Bag	Menchu Apostol	Viva Records	99045	Pop/Rock	CD
2000	By Heart	Lea Salonga	BMG	9	Easy Listening	CD
2000	Jazz in Time	Richard Merk	Star Records	11-27006-4	Jazz	CD
2000	Revive (Bonus Disc)	Gary Valenciano	Universal Records Philippines	41221	Religious	CD
2000	Servant of All	Various artists	Viva Records	0000125	Pop/Rock	Compilation CD
2000	Show Me The Way	Chad Borja	Warner Music Philippines		Pop/Rock	Digital Media
2000	Simply ... Rex	Rex Smith	MCA	59721	Pop/Rock	CD
2000	The Disco Project	Passage	Neo Musiq	2000006	Pop/Rock	CD
2001	At The Movies	Ivy Violan	Viva Records	2001-02	Pop/Rock	CD
2001	My Souvenirs	Martin Nievera	EMI / PolyEast Records	016145	Easy Listening	CD
2001	Oras	Rannie Raymundo	Neo Musiq	NR-CAS-01-028	Pop/Rock	CD
2001	Soulitude	Mon David			Easy Listening	CD
2003	Beyond WordsTrack 10: Until Then	Gary Valenciano	Universal Records Philippines	669910560853		CD and Digital Media
2003	... Miracle / Giliw	Martin Nievera	Vicor Music	117	Easy Listening	CD
2004	Best Wishes: A Wedding Songs Collection	Martin Nievera	EMI / PolyEast Records	578510	Easy Listening	CD
2004	Thor	Thor	Evolution Music / Warner Music Philippines		R&B	CD
2004	Once in a Lifetime	Freestyle	Viva Records	VR CDS 04 137	Pop	CD
2005	When Love Is Gone	Martin Nievera	EMI / PolyEast Records	34645	Easy Listening	CD
2005	Life and Time	Mon David	Candid Records Philippines	CAN-KC-7001	Vocal Jazz	CD
2006	My One and Only Love	Mon David	Candid Records Philippines		Vocal Jazz	CD
2007	Milestones	Martin Nievera	EMI	09291	Easy Listening	CD
2008	Angelsong	Aya Yuson	Candid Records Philippines		Jazz	CD
2012	Stranger on the Shore	Mishka Adams	Candid Records	CCD 79858	Jazz	CD

== Awards ==
Year	Award	Category	Work	Artist/s or Group	Result
1991	4th Awit Awards	Gold Record Award	Tots Tolentino (self-titled album)	Tots Tolentino	Won
1991	4th Awit Awards	Best Jazz Recording	Inah	Tots Tolentino	Won
1992	5th Awit Awards	Best Jazz Instrumental Recording	Inah	Tots Tolentino	Won
2003	15th Awit Awards	Best Jazz Instrumental Recording	Kalabukab	Buhay (Wowee Posadas (keyboards), Mar Dizon (drums), Meong Pacana (bass), and Tots Tolentino (saxophone)	Won
2005	18th Aliw Awards	Best Instrumental Artist		Tots Tolentino (saxophone)	Nominated
2005	18th Awit Awards	Best Jazz Album	Johnny Alegre AFFINITY (self-titled album)	Johnny Alegre AFFINITY	Nominated
2008	21st Aliw Awards	Best Major Concert	Love's What Matters Most (Valentine Concert)	John Lesaca (violin), Tots Tolentino (saxophone), and Noelle Cassandra (harp)	Nominated
2008	21st Aliw Awards	Best Instrumentalist		Tots Tolentino (saxophone)	Nominated
2016	29th Awit Awards	Best Jazz Recording	The Christ Child	composer: Marlene del Rosario / instrumentalist: Tots Tolentino	Nominated
