= Gerard Salonga =

Filipino conductor, composer, and arranger (born 1973)

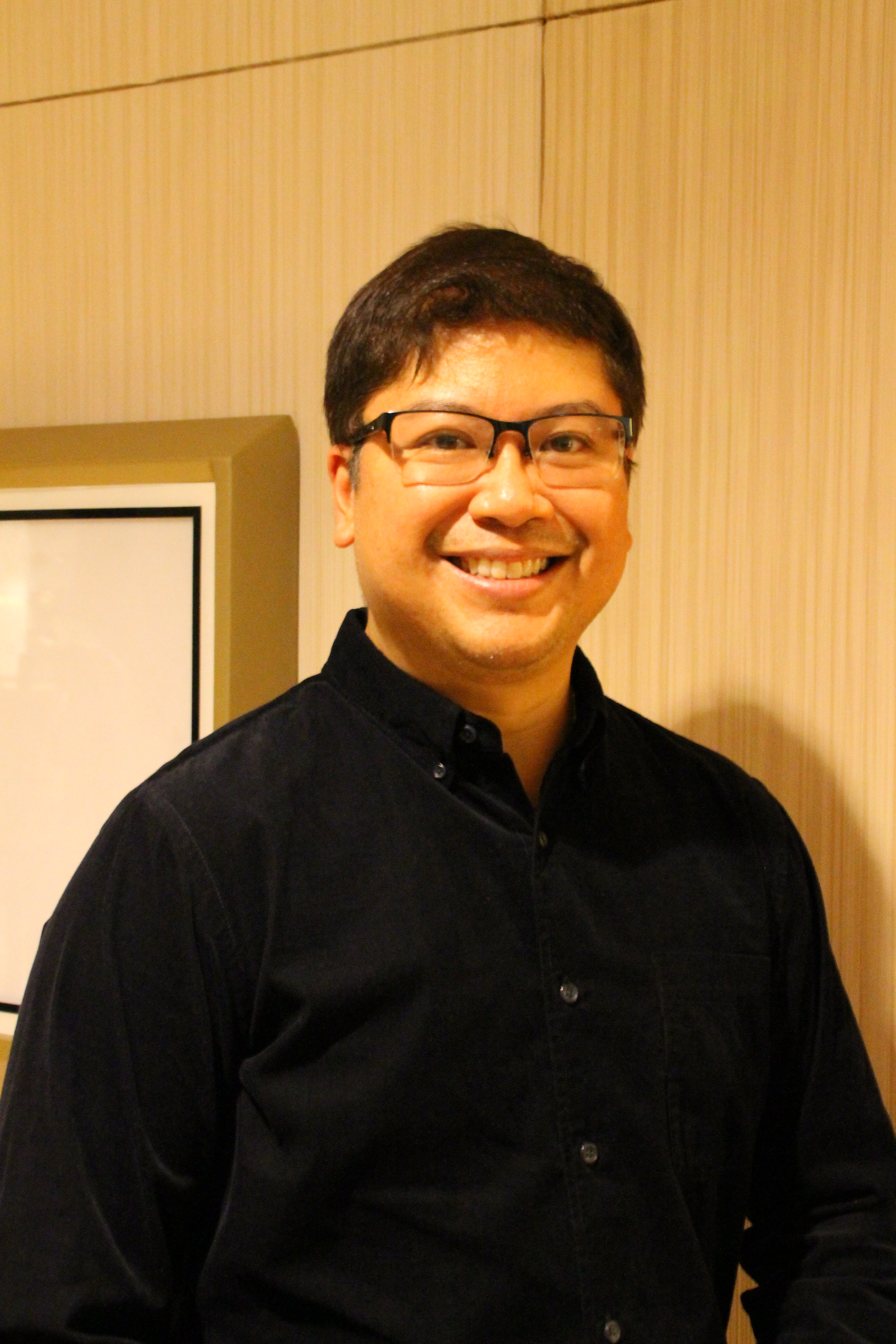
- Salonga in 2016
- Born: Gerard Imutan Salonga; October 11, 1973 (age 53); Manila, Philippines
- Education: Ateneo de Manila University (BA); Berklee College of Music (MA)
- Occupations: Conductor; composer; arranger
- Years active: 1981–present
- Organization: FILharmoniKA
- Spouse: Divina Francisco
- Children: 2
- Relatives: Lea Salonga (sister); Nic Chien (nephew); Maniya Barredo (cousin); Shay Mitchell (cousin)

Gerard Imutan Salonga (born October 11, 1973) is a Filipino conductor, composer, and arranger known for his work in classical, film, and popular music. He is the founder of FILharmoniKA and has served as resident conductor of the Malaysian Philharmonic Orchestra since 2019. He has previously served as music director of the ABS-CBN Philharmonic Orchestra from 2012 to 2020, was assistant conductor of the Hong Kong Philharmonic Orchestra from 2016 to 2018.

Beyond his leadership roles, he has guest-conducted major ensembles across Asia, Australia, Europe, and North America, and his orchestrations have been performed by international symphonies including the New York Pops, Sydney Symphony Orchestra, and BBC Symphony Orchestra. In recognition of his contributions, Salonga has received multiple Aliw Awards for Best Musical Director and the TOYM Award in 2012.

== Life and career ==
=== 1973–1998: Early life and education ===
Gerard Imutan Salonga was born on October 11, 1973, in Manila, Philippines, to Maria Ligaya Alcantara Imutan (b. 1937) and Feliciano Genuino Salonga Jr. (1929–2016), a rear admiral in the Philippine Coast Guard Auxiliary and chairman of the Subic Bay Metropolitan Authority. His elder sister is actress and singer Lea Salonga. He began piano studies at the age of five and appeared with his sister on her debut album Small Voice (1981). In 1985, the siblings also performed at the 8th Metro Manila Popular Music Festival, interpreting Tess Concepcion's entry "Musika, Lata, Sipol at La La La" [Music, Tin Can, Whistle and La La La], which won second place. He completed his primary and secondary education Operation Brotherhood (OB) Montessori Center.

Salonga earned a Bachelor of Arts in Interdisciplinary Studies degree from the Ateneo de Manila University in 1994, and briefly studied music theory with Filipino composer Ryan Cayabyab. He later attended the Berklee College of Music in Boston, where he graduated summa cum laude in 1998 with a Master of Arts degree in Contemporary Writing and Production, receiving Berklee's Contemporary Writing and Production Achievement Award.

=== 1999–2011: Early career ===
After graduating, Salonga worked briefly at Sony Pictures as an orchestrator and music copyist before returning to the Philippines in 1999. He began arranging and conducting for ensembles such as the Philippine Philharmonic Orchestra and the Manila Philharmonic Orchestra, and by 2005 had won three consecutive Aliw Awards for Best Musical Director, later earning a fourth in 2008. In 2005, he co-founded the Global Studio Orchestra, later renamed FILharmoniKA, as the in-house orchestra for Global Content Center, a recording and post-production facility in Alabang. On May 8, 2005, Salonga married Divina "DJ" Francisco, a violinist, at Santuario de San Antonio Parish in Makati.

Salonga collaborated widely with classical ensembles and Philippine popular musicians, including Lani Misalucha, Martin Nievera, and Regine Velasquez. He arranged and produced award-winning station IDs for The Filipino Channel in 2004 and 2005, both of which won Promax World Silver Awards in New York for "Best Use of Music/Post Score." In 2006, he scored the soundtrack for the film Ang Pamana: The Inheritance, which premiered at the Hawai'i International Film Festival. With FILharmoniKA, he led recordings in the Musika Natin [Our Music] series, highlighting works of composers such as Lucio San Pedro, Ángel Peña, and Antonio Buenaventura. He later collaborated on Eastern Skies (2007) with jazz guitarist Johnny Alegre and produced Kumpas (2008), an album featuring orchestral renditions of songs by rock artists Ely Buendia, Sampaguita, Noel Cabangon, and Wally Gonzales.

=== 2012–present: International conducting ===
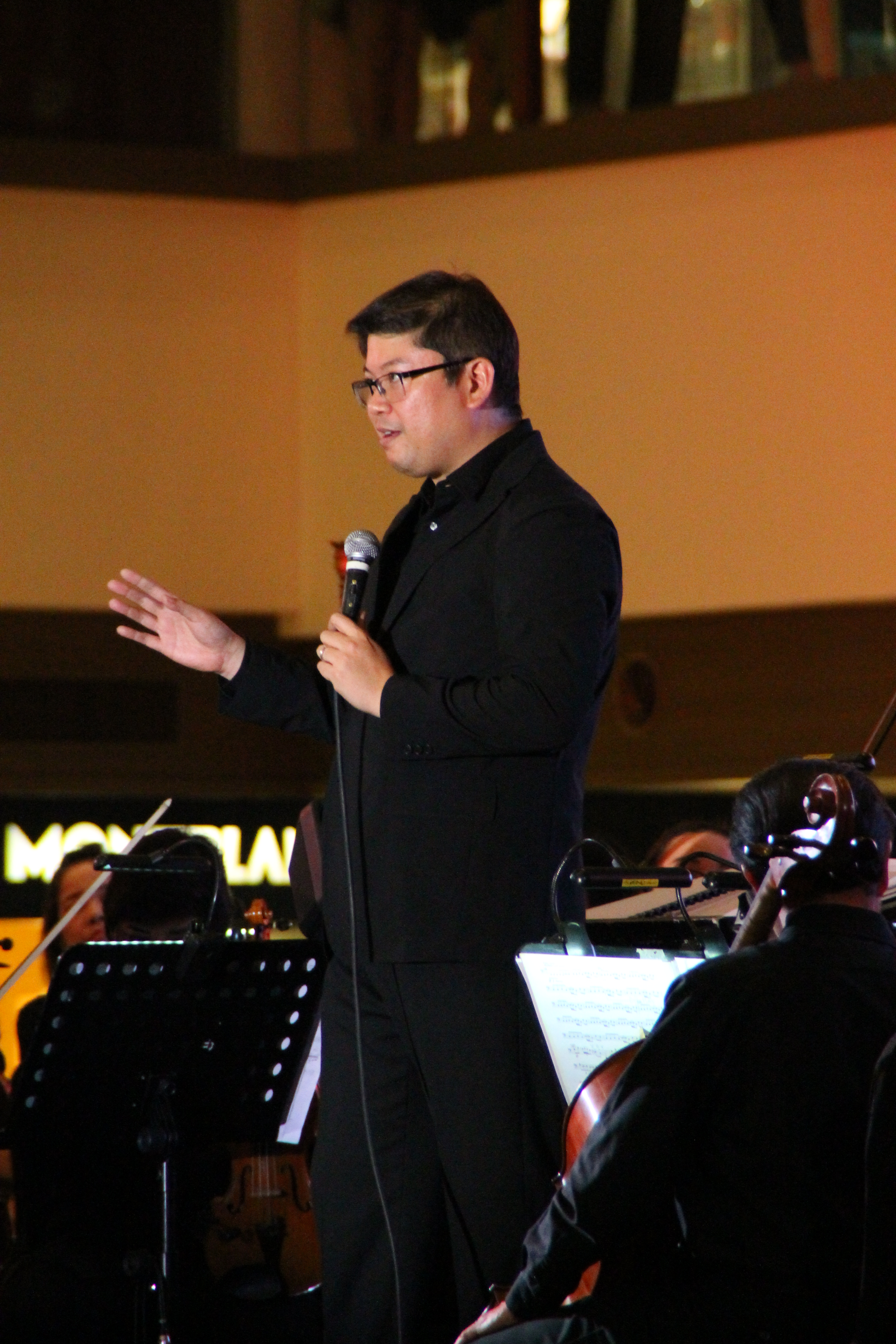
Salonga at a 2016 concert with the ABS-CBN Philharmonic Orchestra

In July 2012, Salonga was appointed the first music director of the newly established ABS-CBN Philharmonic Orchestra, a post he held until 2020. In April 2016, he was named one of the assistant conductors of the Hong Kong Philharmonic Orchestra under Jaap van Zweden, serving until 2018.

Salonga first appeared as a guest conductor with the Malaysian Philharmonic Orchestra in 2018 and was officially appointed Resident Conductor in January 2019. In this role, he has led symphonic, ballet, opera, pops, family, and film presentations, including film-in-concert events such as Harry Potter, Raiders of the Lost Ark, Ratatouille, and other Disney productions.

In 2018, Salonga conducted the world premiere of Lachlan Skipworth's Breath of Thunder with the Sydney Symphony Orchestra and Taikoz at the Sydney Opera House, earning an APRA Performance of the Year nomination. In 2019, he collaborated on a recording of George Gershwin works with pianist Cecile Licad and the Sønderjyllands Symfoniorkester in Denmark, released by Danacord.

During the COVID-19 pandemic, he served as music producer for the Malaysian Philharmonic Orchestra's YouTube channel (MPOTV) and Artistic Advisor for the Malaysian Composers’ Collective, premiering new works by Malaysian composers. Since 2021, he has also served as music director of the Orchestra of the Filipino Youth (OFY), a Manila-based training orchestra for young musicians. In 2023, he conducted the world premiere of Elliot Leung’s Metaverse Symphony with the Hong Kong Philharmonic Orchestra, held at the Hong Kong Cultural Centre, a work commissioned to debut in both the concert hall and the metaverse. The recording of which was released by Sony Classical.

In March 2025, Salonga conducted the Marvel Studios Infinity Saga concert at The Theatre at Solaire in Manila. In August of the same year, Salonga served as a music director for the Theatre Group Asia production of Into the Woods conducted Star Wars: The Empire Strikes Back In Concert with FILharmoniKA. His guest conducting appearances have included venues such as the Sydney Opera House and Royal Albert Hall, leading ensembles like the Sydney Symphony Orchestra, Royal Philharmonic Orchestra, and BBC Symphony Orchestra.

== Awards and recognition ==
Salonga has received multiple honors for his contributions to music and the performing arts. He is a four-time recipient of the Aliw Award for Best Musical Director and was inducted into the Aliw Awards Hall of Fame in 2009. In the recording industry, he received the Awit Award for Best Arrangement, while in Philippine musical theatre, he has twice won the Gawad Buhay Award for Outstanding Musical Direction for his work on the Manila productions of West Side Story and Sweeney Todd: The Demon Barber of Fleet Street.

In 2012, Salonga was named one of the recipients of The Outstanding Young Men (TOYM) Award, a national recognition program honoring Filipinos under 40 who have demonstrated excellence in their fields and significant contributions to society. In 2021, he was among the recipients of the SUDI National Music Award presented by the National Commission for Culture and the Arts, which recognizes outstanding achievements in Philippine music.
