= Johnny Alegre =

Jazz guitarist and composer from the Philippines (born 1955)

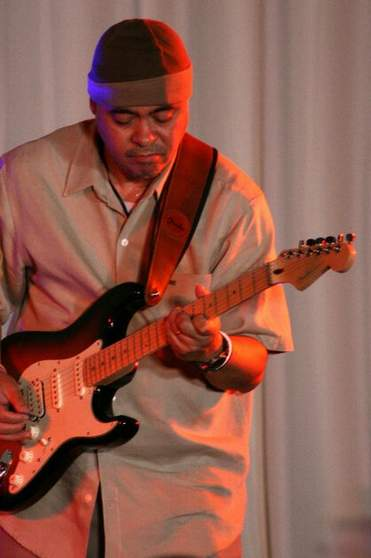
- Alegre in 2011
- Born: Juan Bautista Alegre y Hernaez; June 4, 1955 (age 71); Pasay, Rizal, Philippines
- Education: University of the Philippines
- Spouse: Jocelyn Albao Alegre
- Parents: Narciso J. Alegre (father); Teodora Hernaez de Alegre (mother)
- Relatives: Juan B. Alegre (grandfather); Amanda Sargent (grandmother)
- Musical career
- Genres: Jazz, World Fusion
- Occupations: Musician, Guitarist-Composer
- Instruments: Guitar, Keyboards
- Years active: 1981–present
- Labels: Candid, MCA
- Member of: Johnny Alegre AFFINITY; HUMANFOLK
- Website: www.johnnyalegre.com

Juan Bautista Hernaez Alegre III (born June 4, 1955), known professionally as Johnny Alegre, is a jazz guitarist and composer from Manila, Philippines. He leads the jazz group Johnny Alegre Affinity and the world music group Humanfolk.

== Biography ==
=== Career ===
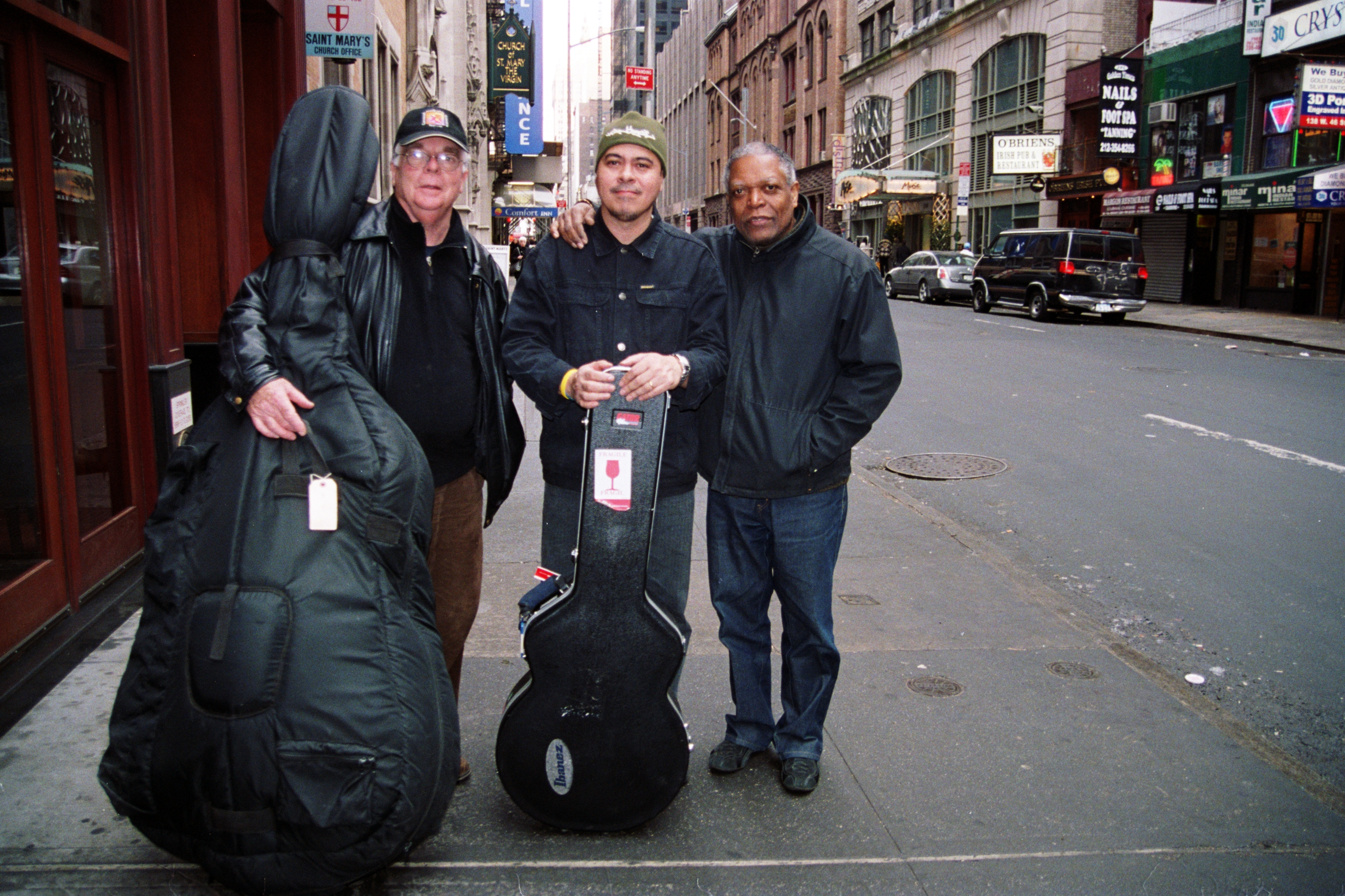
Johnny Alegre (center) with bassist Ron McClure (left) and drummer Billy Hart (right). The photo was taken in New York City when they recorded the Johnny Alegre 3 album, which was distributed by MCA Music.

Alegre studied composition at the University of the Philippines College of Music in the latter 1970s. He was a founding member of the U.P. Jazz Ensemble. He participated in workshops by composer Erhard Karkoschka, guitarist Ike Isaacs, and composer Chou Wen-chung.

In May 2002, Alegre formed the Johnny Alegre Affinity with bassist Colby de la Calzada, drummer Koko Bermejo, pianist Elhmir Saison, and saxophonist Tots Tolentino. Their first recorded work, "Stones of Intramuros", written by Alegre, was included in the limited edition Philippine jazz anthology Adobo Jazz: A Portrait of the Filipino as a Jazz Artist (Vol. 1).

The self-titled album Johnny Alegre Affinity was released in the Philippines in mid-2005 by Candid Records Philippines; and was rereleased in England the same year by Candid Records (UK) for global distribution as Jazzhound. This was followed by performances at the PizzaExpress Jazz Club in London with guest saxophonist, Dimitri Vassilakis.

During 2006 and 2007, Alegre and Affinity worked on Eastern Skies, an album of original compositions with the Global Studio Orchestra conducted by Gerard Salonga. In 2009 MCA released Johnny Alegre 3, a trio album with Ron McClure (bass) and Billy Hart (drums). Alegre was MCA's first jazz act from the Philippines. In 2014, MCA released a compilation of highlights from Alegre's Candid Records recordings, entitled Stories.

In 2008, Alegre recorded a world music album, Humanfolk, with Cynthia Alexander and Malek Lopez, along with drummer Roberto Juan Rodriguez and percussionist Susie Ibarra, and the later addition of singer-keyboardist Abby Clutario. For Humanfolk, Alegre wrote the award-winning "Para Sa Tao" based on the Baybayin letters of the ancient Tagalog language.

Alegre is profiled in the books The Great Jazz Guitarists by Scott Yanow and the Cultural Center of the Philippines Encyclopedia of Philippine Art, Second edition (Volume 7).

In November 2023, a retrospective of Alegre's urban folk compositions for Humanfolk were featured in a 2-hour recital at the Ayala Museum, hosted by the Filipinas Heritage Library. The official recorded music of Johnny Alegre, including independent works, is aggregated by The Orchard, a subsidiary of Sony Music Entertainment.

=== Family ===
Johnny Alegre is the youngest surviving grandchild of the late Senator Juan Bautista Alegre y Levantino, senator who represented the Philippines's 6th senatorial district to the 6th and 7th Philippine Legislatures. The family genealogy of Johnny Alegre is descended from Carlist exiles from Spain to the Philippines and intermarried with Filipinos. His paternal grandmother, Amanda ("Aimee") Alegre née Sargent, is descended from the early Sargent family of New England.

== Other personas ==
Johnny Alegre is a member of FILSCAP and tenured with the Philippine International Jazz and Arts Festival as a consultant. He is an active Wikimedian advocate that includes WikiProject Jazz. As Juan Bautista H. Alegre, he is a Rotary Club past president (Makati Rockwell, Rotary International District 3830), and was conferred a Paul Harris fellowship.

== Discography ==
Album	Catalog/UPC No.	Label	Year
Stones of Intramuros (single) Track 9 Adobo Jazz: A Portrait of the Filipino as a Jazz Artist, Vol. 1		IndiRa	2002
Johnny Alegre AFFINITY	CAN-KC-5001	Candid	2005
Jazzhound (UK release)	CCD 79842	Candid	2005
Jazzhound (radio edit, single) Track 4 Environmentally Sound: A Select Anthology of Songs Inspired by the Earth		WWF	2006
Eastern Skies	CAN-KC-5006	Candid	2007
Johnny Alegre 3	UPC:00600753200070	MCA	2009
Mammals	Japan Music Week	PH AFFINITY Productions	2010
Humanfolk	UPC:00600753330432	MCA	2011
Stories	UPC:00602537694600	MCA	2014
"ILWY" (vinyl)	HOURGLASS001	Hourglass	2020
Johnny Alegre AFFINITY (2LP)	JAA-001-BR	Backspacer	2022
Johnny Alegre 3 (2LP)	JA3-001-BR	Backspacer	2024

== Videography ==
=== Johnny Alegre Affinity ===
Title	Musicians	Director	Producer	Genre	Year	Venue
Jazz in Time: Commemorative Concert XII	Johnny Alegre, guitar ♦ Colby dela Calzada, contrabass ♦ Koko Bermejo, drums ♦ Elhmir Saison, piano ♦ Tots Tolentino, alto sax	Fritz Ynfante	Upsilon Sigma Phi	jazz concert	2003	U.P. Theater
Jazzhound official music video	Johnny Alegre, guitar ♦ Colby dela Calzada, contrabass ♦ Koko Bermejo, drums ♦ Elhmir Saison, piano ♦ Tots Tolentino, alto sax	Fritz Ynfante (concert footage); Wilfred Galila (video montage)	Mowelfund; PH AFFINITY Productions	music video	2005	Mowelfund
3rd Manila Jazz Festival	Johnny Alegre, guitar ♦ Simon Tan, contrabass ♦ Koko Bermejo, drums ♦ Elhmir Saison, piano ♦ Tots Tolentino, alto sax	Angela Poblador	Jewelmer International Corporation	jazz concert	2005	Greenbelt Theater
Pinoy Jazz: The Story of Jazz in the Philippines	Johnny Alegre, guitar ♦ Colby dela Calzada, contrabass ♦ Koko Bermejo, drums ♦ Elhmir Saison, piano ♦ Tots Tolentino, alto sax	Collis Davis	Richie Quirino, Collis Davis	documentary	2006	U.P. Theater
Fête de la Musique 2011	Johnny Alegre, guitar ♦ Colby dela Calzada, electric bass ♦ Mar Dizon, drums	Franz Lawrence Tan	Fête de la Musique	jazz concert	2011	The Fort BGC, Taguig
Tiendesitas Super Jazz Weekend	Johnny Alegre, guitar ♦ Yuna Reguerra, electric bass ♦ Wendell Garcia, drums ♦ Elhmir Saison, keyboards	Dondi Santos	Tiendesitas	jazz concert	2014	Tiendesitas
Beacon Call	Johnny Alegre, guitar ♦ Colby dela Calzada, contrabass ♦ Koko Bermejo, drums ♦ Joey Quirino, piano ♦ Ria Villena-Osorio, orchestration ♦ Gerard Salonga, conductor	MCA Music Philippines	PH AFFINITY Productions	sampler	2014	MCA Music Philippines
Manila Jazz	Interviews with Johnny Alegre, Tots Tolentino, Elhmir Saison, Mar Dizon, (seen: Colby dela Calzada)	Richard Villamor	Richard Villamor	documentary	2013	Greater Manila Area

=== Humanfolk ===
Title	Musicians	Director	Producer	Category	Year	Venue
Para Sa Tao	Abby Clutario, vocals, keyboards & Chapman Stick ♦ Johnny Alegre, acoustic guitar ♦ Cynthia Alexander, bass ♦ Malek Lopez, electronics	Daphne Oliveros	PH AFFINITY Productions	music video	2011	Greater Manila Area
Hexagram II	Abby Clutario, keyboards & vocals ♦ Johnny Alegre, guitars & percussion ♦ Rodney Vidanes, bass ♦ Zach Lucero, drums ♦ Frances Escapé, percussion	Perth Salva	PH AFFINITY Productions	live in the studio	2013	Perthman Studios, San Juan, Manila
Himig Ng Pasko	Abby Clutario, keyboards & vocals ♦ Johnny Alegre, guitars & percussion ♦ Rodney Vidanes, bass ♦ Zach Lucero, drums	JM Quiblat	PH AFFINITY Productions	music video	2014	Infinitif Studios
Naglalarong Ilaw	Kris Gorra Dancel, vocals & rhythm guitar ♦ Johnny Alegre, guitars ♦ Abby Clutario, keyboards & harmonies ♦ Rodney Vidanes, bass ♦ Zach Lucero, drums ♦ Deej Rodriguez, percussion	Phillip Miguel Luis & Lycylle Bianca Tse Cawaling	PH AFFINITY Productions	music video	2015	Infinitif Studios
Indiemand	Johnny Alegre, guitars ♦ Abby Clutario, keyboards & vocals ♦ Deej Rodriguez, percussion	Pamela Carbonell	The Filipino Channel	music video	2019	Pasig City Wildlife Reserve

== Awards ==
Year	Award
1974	Don Carlos Palanca Awards for Literature, One-Act Play (English) Division, 2nd Place
1982	Foremost Exponent of Jazz awarded by the Philippine Ministry of Tourism at the 1st Cebu Jazz Festival
2006	Award Of Excellence for Exemplary Musicianship by WWF Philippines for his musical support of the "For A Living Planet" advocacy.
2010	Plaque of Appreciation for his musical support of the Climate Change advocacy from a combined Oxfam and Dakila initiative.
2012	Awit Awards, Best World Music Recording, Humanfolk, Philippine Association of the Record Industry
2013	Icon Award, 8th Philippine International Jazz and Arts Festival
2013	Best Performer Award, Kansai Music Conference
2014	Aliw Awards, Best Instrumentalist
2014	Living the Credo Award, Upsilon Sigma Phi Alumni Association
2016	Outstanding Professional Award, Superbrands Philippines Council
2019	Inspiring Leadership Award, Rotary International District 3830
2019	Paul Harris Fellow, The Rotary Foundation
2026	39th Awit Awards, Awit Award Winner – Best Instrumental Recording “The Awakening” by Kiss the Bride.

=== Letters from UNESCO ===
Letters of Recognition from UNESCO Goodwill Ambassador for Inter-Cultural Dialogue, Herbie Hancock; for Johnny Alegre's sustained partnership and participation in International Jazz Day.

- 2015
- 2019
- 2020
- 2022
- 2023
- 2024
- 2025

== Paternal line ==
Ancestors of Johnny Alegre

Cmdte. Narciso Alegre y Solsona; General of the 1st-3rd Carlist wars c. 1800
Narciso Alegre y Pellicer; Carlist exile from Villarroya de los Pinares; 1866 - 1919
Juana Pellicer y Larrocha
Juan Bautista Alegre y Levantino; Senator of the 6th and 7th Philippine Legislatures; Feb 2, 1882 - June 14, 1931
Ramona Levantino y Lascano c. 1800 - 1918
Narciso Joseph Alegre y Sargent; Filipino civil liberties advocate Apr 4, 1911 - October 17, 1980
Amanda ("Aimee") Sargent; Apr 10, 1885 - July 1, 1945
Juan Bautista Alegre y Hernaez; Jazz guitarist and composer from Manila, Philippines; Jun 4, 1955 -
Teodora Hernaez de Alegre; Apr 1, 1935 - October 22, 2014

== Images ==
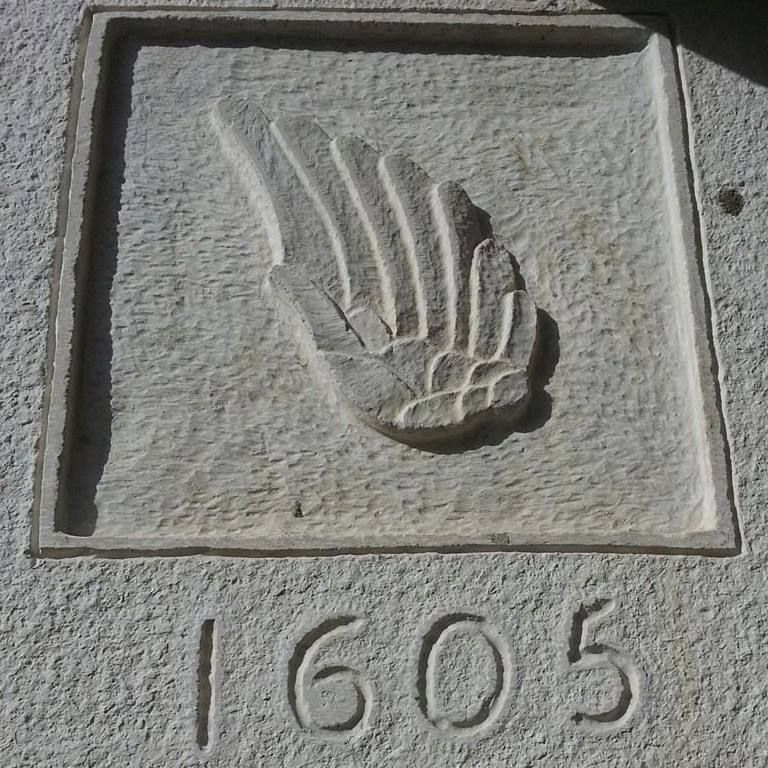
Historical emblem of the Alegre family of Villarroya de los Pinares

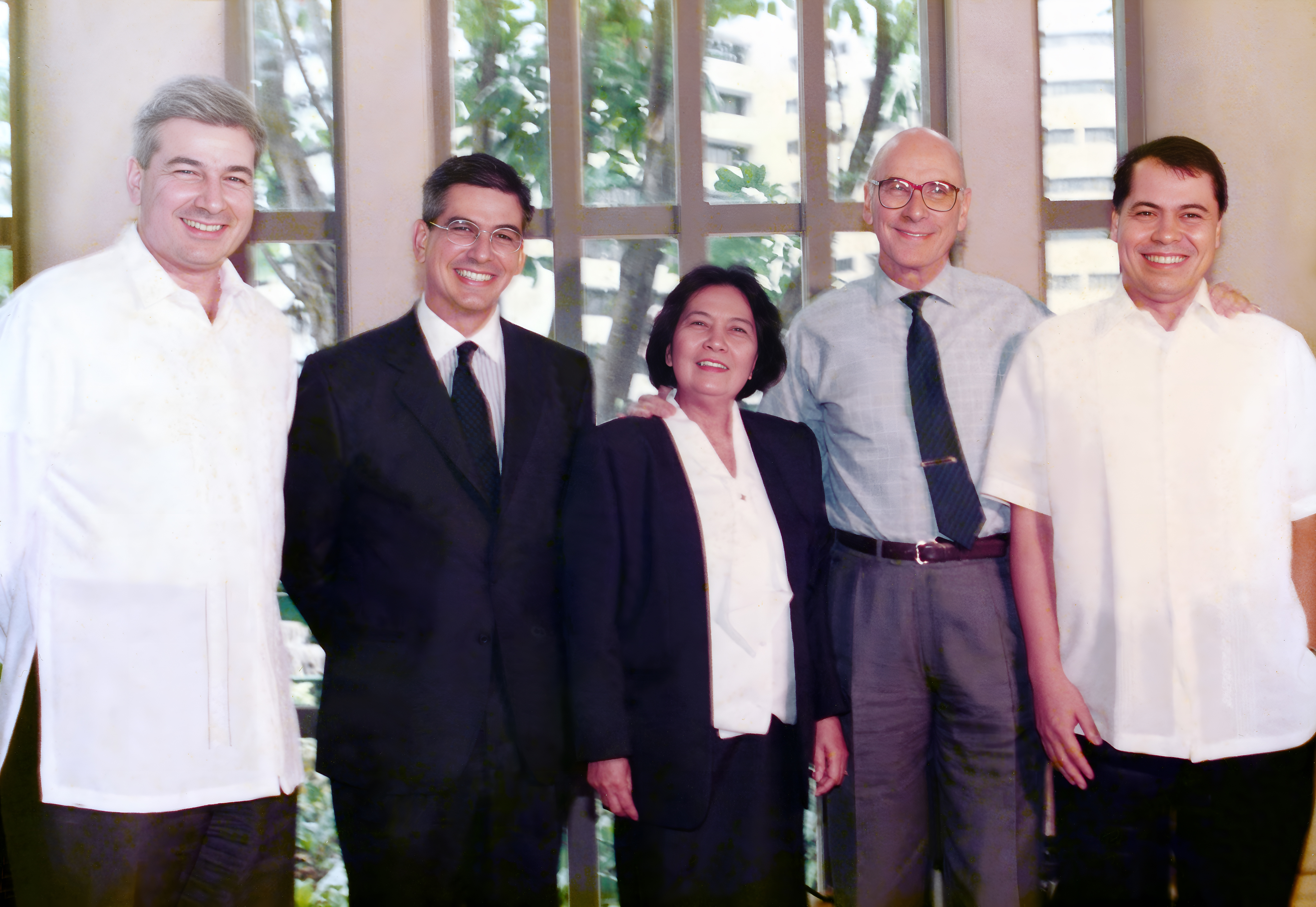
Johnny Alegre at his mother's corporate retirement, with the Zobel family

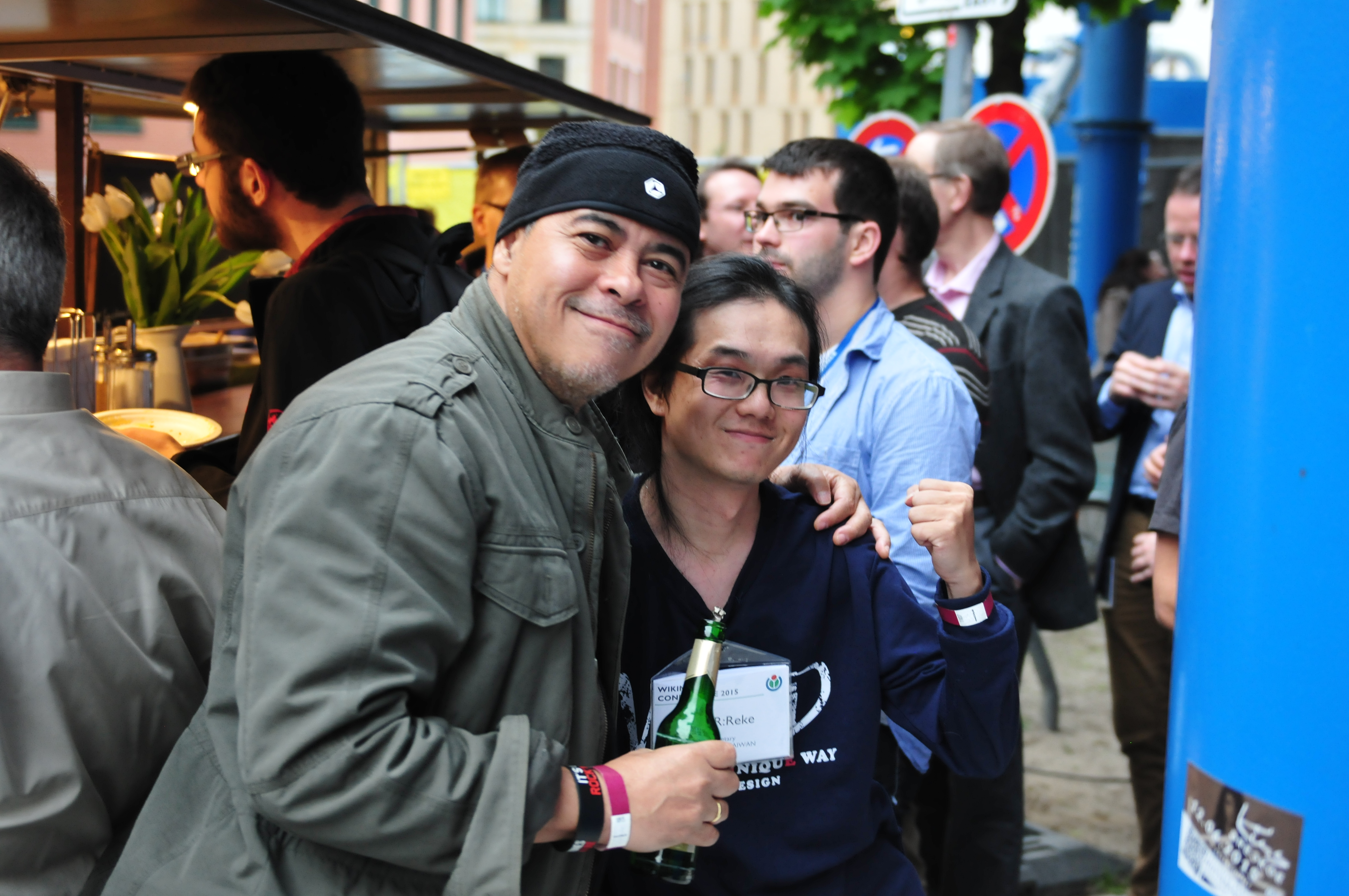
Johnny Alegre at the 2015 Wikimedia Conference in Berlin

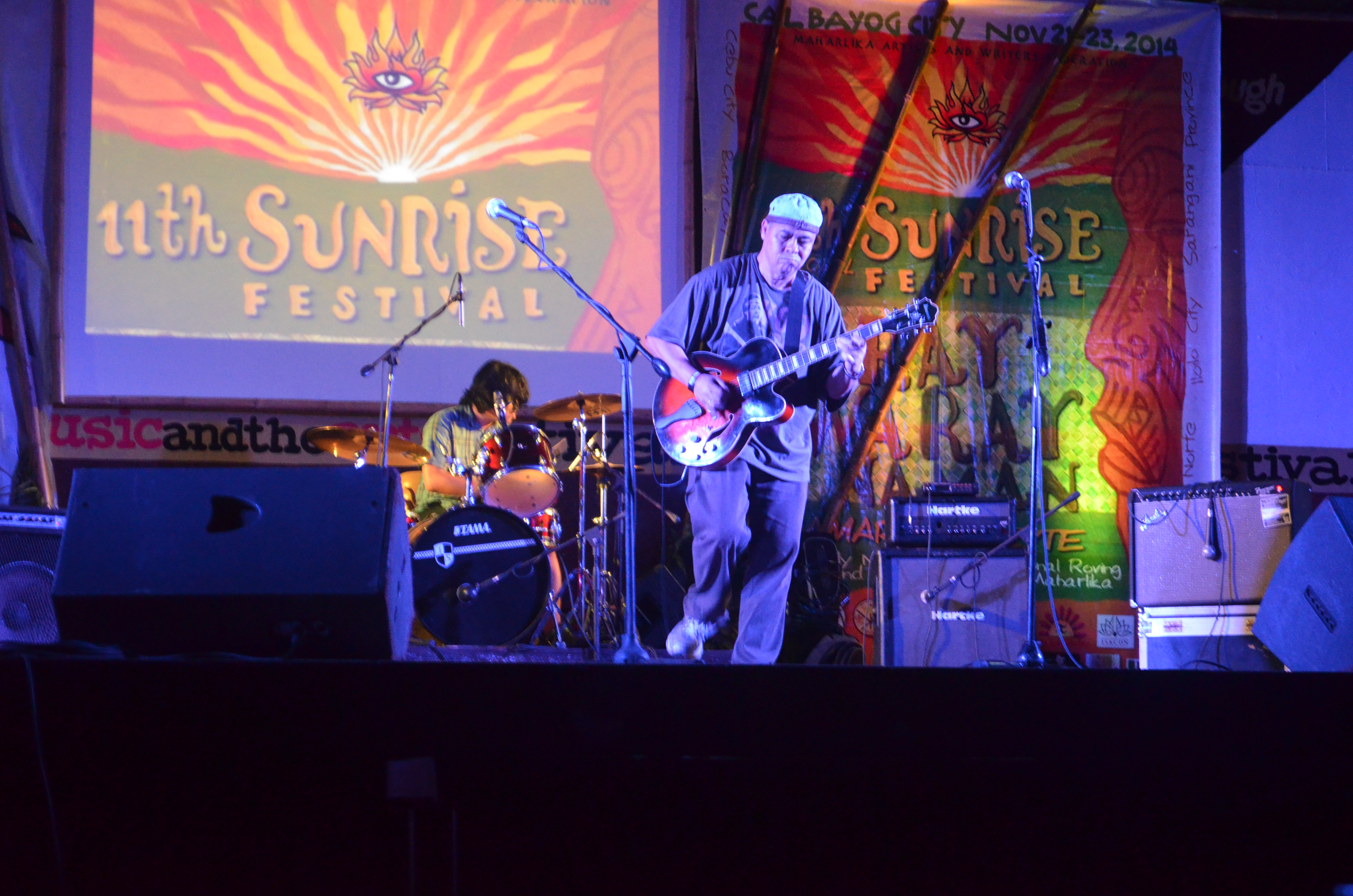
Johnny Alegre at the 2014 Waray Wikipedia, 11th Sunrise Festival

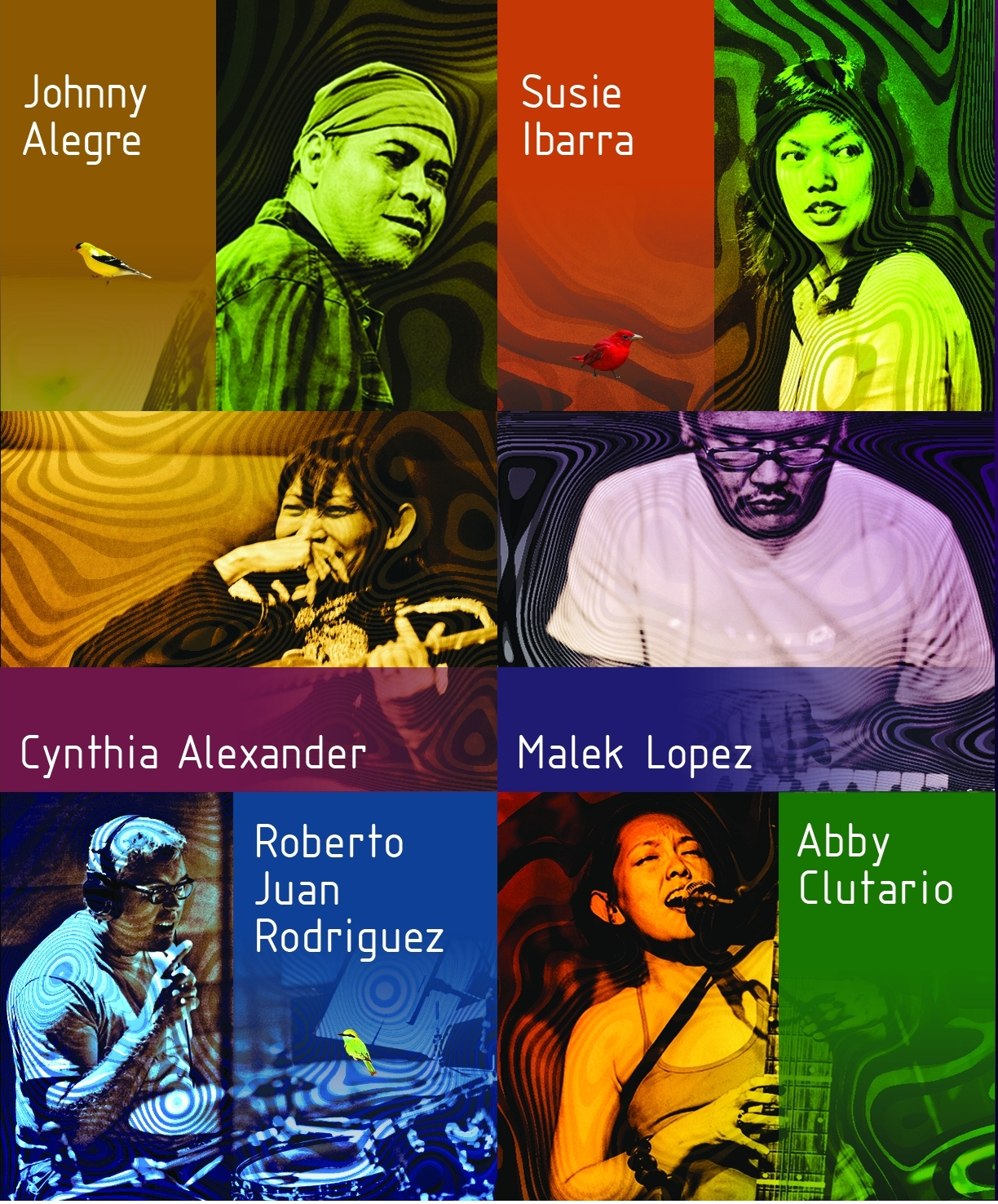
Johnny Alegre's maiden HUMANFOLK project

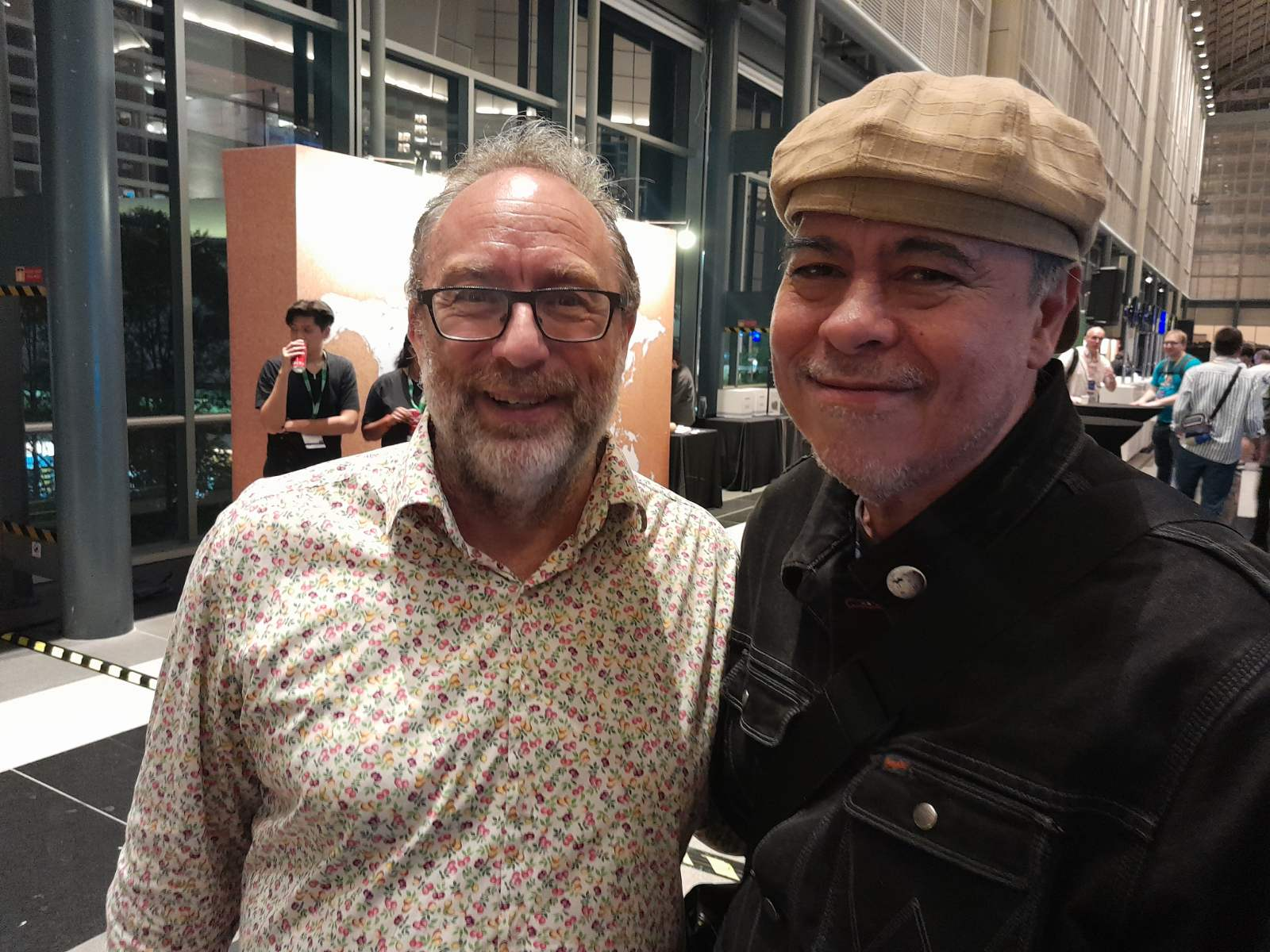
Wikipedia co-founder Jimmy Wales and Johnny Alegre pose for a photo in Wikimania 2023, Singapore
