= Adobo Jazz =

Compilation album series of Philippine jazz

Adobo Jazz: A Portrait of the Filipino as a Jazz Artist, Vol. 1

Compilation album by various artists
- Released: 2002
- Studio: Mastered at Greenhill Sound
- Genre: jazz
- Label: IndiRa Records
- Producer: Rhany Torres

Adobo Jazz, Vol. 2

Compilation album by various artists
- Released: 2002
- Studio: Mastered at Greenhill Sound
- Genre: jazz
- Label: IndiRa Records
- Producer: Rhany Torres and Richie Quirino

Adobo Jazz: Filipino Jazz Music of Our Time, Vol. 1

Compilation album by various artists
- Released: 2019
- Studio: Wild Grass Recording Studios
- Genre: jazz
- Label: Bowfinger Records
- Producer: National Commission for Culture and the Arts and George Almaden

Adobo Jazz is a Pinoy jazz compilation album series presenting a historical overview of jazz music in the Philippines.

== Series One ==
=== Adobo Jazz: A Portrait of the Filipino as a Jazz Artist, Vol. 1 ===
Track	Title	Artist	Writer(s)	Length	Personnel	Recording Venue
1	Sugar Steps	Fred Elizalde	Fred Elizalde	03:09	Fred Elizalde (piano) / soloists: Adrian Rollini (bass saxophone) Bobby Davis (clarinet) Chelsea Quealey (trumpet)	recorded in England, 1928
2	Moments of Tranquility	Destiny	Ed Jose	07:42	Ed Jose (Rhodes piano, synthesizer) Bob Aves (guitar) Nick Lizares (flute) Eddie Cariño (bass) Richie Quirino (drums)	Cinema-Audio Recording Studios, 1975
3	Dolphin Dance	Bobby Enriquez	Herbie Hancock	08:42	Bobby Enriquez (piano) Colby dela Calzada (bass) Bobby Gonzales (drums)	Greenhill Sound, 1985
4	Alam Ko	MAJAM	Joey Valenciano	06:36	Johnny Torres (piano) Ruben Reyes (bass) Joey Valenciano (drums)	recorded live, U.P. Sunken Garden, 1998
5	Driftin'	J.R. COBB Jazz Chamber	Herbie Hancock	06:25	Butch Silverio (trumpet) Butch Saulog (piano) Johnny Alegre (guitar) Colby dela Calzada (bass) Richie Quirino (drums) Michael Guevarra (guest on tenor sax)	recorded live, Galo's, 1999
6	Quiapo	Bernard Soler	Bernard Soler	06:48	Bernard Soler (acoustic guitar)	recorded in Australia, 2002
7	The Fool on the Hill	Manila Jazz Quartet	Lennon-McCartney	05:16	Rolly Rodriguez (alto sax) Nazing Aaron (keyboards) Mario Talag (bass) Gil Galiluyo (drums)	Greenhill Sound, 2001
8	A Distant Soil	WDOUJI	Simon Tan	05:23	Ronald Tomas (soprano sax) Aya Yuson (guitar) Simon Tan (bass) Koko Bermejo (drums)	recorded live, Freedom Bar, 2002
9	I. Wind and Water / II. Stones of Intramuros	Johnny Alegre AFFINITY	Johnny Alegre	08:02	Johnny Alegre (guitar) Tots Tolentino (alto sax) Elhmir Saison (piano) Colby dela Calzada (bass) Koko Bermejo (drums)	Pink Noise Studios, 2002
10	A Night in Tunisia	Monk's Jazz Bureau	John Birks Gillespie	11:58	Terry Undag (trumpet) Tots Tolentino (alto sax) Marc Lopez (piano) Colby dela Calzada (bass) George San Jose (drums)	recorded live, Monk's Dream, 2002
11	Into Somethin'	Parliament Syndicate	Ike Dy-Liacco, Victor Oria, & John B. Powers	05:36	Judith Alegarbes (lead vocals) Ike Dy-Liacco (alto & soprano sax, flute) Ruel Cabrera (trumpet & fulgelhorn) Victor Oria (keyboards, keyboard programming) Riki Gonzales (guitar) Kim Lesaca (bass) Alex Fidel (drums) Chedi Vergara (guest vocals)	DigiTracks, 2002
Executive Producers: Rhaniel and Marilou Torres / Produced by Rhany Torres / Digital mastering: Joel Mendoza (Greenhill Sound) / Art Direction: Emorej Ebanreb / Artists: Phoenix Santos, Thatic Maestro, Jhoeng Malana / Photographs courtesy of Tonette Jacinto / Liner notes by Richie Quirino

=== Adobo Jazz Vol. 2 ===
Track	Title	Artist	Writer(s)	Length	Personnel	Recording Venue
1	Blue Rain	Ben Aristorenas Orchestra	Glenn Miller	03:31	Pete Aristorenas (alto sax) Ben Aristorenas (voice intro)	recorded live, venue unknown, 1956
2	A Lovely Way to Spend an Evening	Tony Carpio	Jimmy McHugh and Harold Adamson	01:50	Tony Carpio (guitar) Chris Abelardo (bass) Ric Flores (drums) Esen Aristorenas (voice intro)	live broadcast, Radio Hongkong, 1963
3	Olivia	Tony Carpio	Tony Carpio	04:58	Tony Carpio (guitar) Chris Abelardo (bass) Ric Flores (drums) Esen Aristorenas (voice intro)	live broadcast, Radio Hongkong, 1963
4	A Foggy Day	Esen Aristorenas Trio	George Gershwin and Ira Gershwin	03:11	Tony Carpio (guitar) Chris Abelardo (bass) Ric Flores (drums)	live broadcast, Radio Hongkong, 1963
5	Give Me the Simple Life	Jazz Friends	Rube Bloom and Harry Ruby	02:33	Baby Yolanda Llanto (vocals) Fred Robles (vibraphone) Joe Ladioray (piano) Rudy Adriano (bass) Bert Delfino (drums) Gordon Ramsay (trumpet, voice intro)	recorded live, Ulog Jazz Club, 1964
6	Bahay Kubo	Jazz Friends	Trad.	06:43	Lito Molina (alto sax) Fred Robles (piano) Angel Peña (bass) Boy Flores (drums) Gordon Ramsay (voice intro)	recorded live, Ulog Jazz Club, 1964
7	This Can't Be Love	Jazz Friends	Richard Rodgers & Lorenz Hart	07:55	Lito Molina (alto sax) Narding Aristorenas (tenor sax) Emil Mijares (piano) Angel Peña (bass) Tony Velarde (drums)	recorded live, Tony Martin residence, 1968
8	Desafinado	Narding Aristorenas	Antonio Carlos Jobim	06:45	Narding Aristorenas (tenor sax) Manny Semana (guitar) Nilo Aristorenas (bass) Bert Tiampeng (drums)	recorded live, the Rasa Siam Cruise Ship, December 23, 1976
9	Stella by Starlight	Barney Kessel Trio	Victor Young	12:02	Barney Kessel (guitar) Roger Herrera (bass) Tony Velarde (drums)	recorded live, Cultural Center of the Philippines Little Theater, March 21, 1977
10	Cherokee	Jazz Friends	Ray Noble	13:43	Lito Molina (alto sax) Narding Aristorenas (tenor sax) Piding Alava (piano) Tiny Umali (bass) Tony Velarde (drums)	recorded live, Thomas Jefferson Cultural Center, 1977
11	Waitin' for Waits	The Bobby Enriquez All-Star Band	Richie Cole & Tom Waits	07:29	Bobby Enriquez (piano) Emil Mijares (vibraphone) Nestor Gonzaga (trumpet) Abel Valdevia (alto sax) Tots Tolentino (tenor sax) Pikoy Villapando (baritone sax) Narding Sanchez (trombone) Roger Herrera (bass) Tony Velarde (drums) Nick Boogie (percussion)	recorded live, Folk Arts Theater, 1985
12	There Will Never Be Another You	Vestre Roxas	Harry Warren & Mack Gordon	02:42	Vestre Roxas (fulgelhorn) Vestre "Junior" Roxas (vocals) Tony Paye (bass) John McCall (piano) Mike Jordan (drums)	Melbourne, Australia, 2002
Executive Producers: Rhaniel Torres and Ricardo Quirino / Produced by Richie Quirino and Rhany Torres / Liner Notes by Angel Peña / Digital mastering: Joel Mendoza (Greenhill Sound) / Layout Artist: Wam Molina / Cover Design: Glenn Bautista and Tiny Nuida

== Series Two ==
=== Adobo Jazz: Filipino Jazz Music of Our Time, Vol. 1 ===
Track	Title	Artist	Writer(s)	Length	Personnel	Recording Venue
1	Tuko	ETS Band	Elhmir Saison	08:20	Elhmir Saison (keyboards) Tots Tolentino (clarinet) Janno Queyquep (guitar) Noel Asistores (bass) Mar Dizon (drums) Wilson Matias (2nd keyboards)	Wild Grass Recording Studios
2	Patring	ETS Band	Mar Dizon	07:40	Elhmir Saison (keyboards) Tots Tolentino (clarinet) Janno Queyquep (guitar) Noel Asistores (bass) Mar Dizon (drums) Wilson Matias (2nd keyboards)	Wild Grass Recording Studios
3	Luntiang Bahay	Jake and the Jazzkals	Joey Quirino	04:56	Joey Quirino (piano) Dave Harder (bass) George Almaden (drums) Kiko de Pano (saxophone)	Wild Grass Recording Studios
4	Kahalumigmigan	Emy Munji	Emy Munji	06:13	Emy Munji (piano)	Wild Grass Recording Studios
5	Kalipay	GTA Project	Elhmir Saison	06:47	Henry Katindig (piano) Dave Harder (bass) George Almaden (drums) Alvin Cornista (saxophone)	Wild Grass Recording Studios
6	Ag Ay Ayam Ta	Erskine Basilio Group	Erskine Basilio	03:14	Francis Etorma (piano) Gerald Flores (bass) Erskine Basilio (guitar) Kiko de Pano (saxophone)	Wild Grass Recording Studios
7	Yugyug	The Jazz Cooperative	Colby dela Calzada	05:57	Henry Katindig (piano) Colby dela Calzada (bass) Lawrence Nolan (drums) Kiko de Pano (saxophone)	Wild Grass Recording Studios
8	Para Sa Iyo	Henry Katindig and Friends	Henry Katindig	04:52	Henry Katindig (piano) Noel Asistores (bass) Mar Dizon (drums) Dingdong Boogie (percussion) Rico Sobrevinas (flute)	Wild Grass Recording Studios
9	Liwanag ng Buwan sa Dagat	The Gaijins	Jay Maclean	05:57	Jay Maclean (piano) Atsuki Okamura (bass) George Almaden (drums) Mitch Stark (guitar) Ariji Jiro (saxophone) Willie "Boogie" Aromin (percussion)	Wild Grass Recording Studios
10	Flunk	Akasha	Mar Dizon	08:37	Henry Katindig (piano) Janno Queyquep (guitar) Rommel dela Cruz (bass) Mar Dizon (drums) Dix Lucero (saxophone) Butch Silverio (trumpet)	Wild Grass Recording Studios
11	Autumn Leaves	Bembet Buena and George Almaden	Joseph Kosma & Jacques Prévert (fr.) / Johnny Mercer (en.)	04:51	Bembet Buena (bass) George Almaden (drums)	recorded live, Jazz Windows, Mandaluyong, 1993
Executive Producer: National Commission for Culture and the Arts / Produced by George Almaden, Jr. / Recording Engineers: Richie Quirino, Willy Munji, Jesse Fermino, Jan Levi Sanchez / Recorded at Wild Grass Recording Studios / Supplementary recordings at Studio Z Audio Production & Recording Studio
