= FILharmoniKA =

- Symphony orchestra
- Former name: Global Studio Orchestra; GC4
- Founded: 2005
- Location: Manila, Philippines

FILharmoniKA is a symphony orchestra based in Manila, Philippines. Originally known as the Global Studio Orchestra or GC4, it was established in 2005 for commercial recording and the film scoring market. Founded by musical director and resident conductor Gerard Salonga, it performs pop, jazz, OPM, and classical music.
