= Philippine International Jazz & Ethnic Arts Festival =

The Philippine International Jazz & Arts Festival (colloquially as, P.I.Jazzfest) is a music festival that takes place in the Philippines. Formerly called the Philippine International Jazz & Ethnic Arts Festival, the event is organized by the PIJazz Foundation and presents international jazz musicians along with prominent Philippine jazz and world artists.

The first P.I. Jazzfest edition took place through January 20–23, 2006, which featured Eumir Deodato and Kevyn Lettau; and the second, which featured Diane Schuur, Flora Purim, Airto Moreira and Eldar Djangirov. In 2008, the P.I.JazzFest, now a member of the Asia Jazz Festival Organization, featured Lee Ritenour, Kurt Elling, Omar Sosa, Raul Midon, Sara Gazarek, Chico & the Gypsies, Incognito, Laurence Elder, Frank Woeste Trio, Lorraine Demarais alongside numerous Filipino jazz performers from the Philippines peninsula and abroad.

P.I.JazzFest is involved with UNICEF, and is committed to bring jazz (and improvisation) awareness to the youth through school workshops such as the JazzKamp summer music training course and the JAZZERO Talent Search.
