= Sa Ugoy ng Duyan =

Song
- Language: Tagalog
- English title: "The Sway of the Baby's Cradle"
- Written: 1948
- Composer: Lucio San Pedro
- Lyricist: Levi Celerio

"Sa Ugoy ng Duyan" (literally in Tagalog: "In the Rocking of the Cradle"; official English title: "The Sway of the Baby Hammock") is a Filipino lullaby. The music was composed by Lucio San Pedro while the lyrics were written by Levi Celerio. Both of them were National Artists of the Philippines and this song was their most popular collaboration. Due to its popularity in the Philippines, it was said by an entertainment writer in the Philippine Entertainment Portal to be as familiar as the Philippine national anthem. It has been performed and recorded by various Filipino artists.

== Composition ==
Lucio San Pedro composed the music of "Ugoy ng Duyan"; it was derived from the fourth piece of his own Suite pastorale in the 1940s. San Pedro drew inspiration in composing the music of the song from the melody his mother, Soledad Diestro, hummed when he and his siblings' were put into sleep during their childhood. The song was supposed to be an entry to a competition in 1945, during the Japanese occupation of the Philippines. However, because he could not find a collaborator to write the lyrics, he was unable to submit it.

In 1947, San Pedro studied at Juilliard School of Music in New York City. He went aboard a ship, the SS Gordon, in 1948 to return to the Philippines. While on a stopover in the Hawaiian city of Honolulu, he met Levi Celerio, who became San Pedro's lyricist for his composition and wrote the words of "Ugoy ng Duyan" during the rest of their trip. The song was completed by the time they landed in Manila. Both San Pedro and Celerio were later named National Artists of the Philippines; they died in 2002, only two days apart from each other.

== Lyrics ==
The lyrics are written in the first-person point of view. It comprises two stanzas, with four lines each. In the first stanza, the singer wishes that their childhood and their memories of their mother will never fade. They also want to hear their mother's song again, which they view to be a song of love. In the second, they describe their sleep to be peaceful while stars watch and guard them. For them, their life becomes like heaven whenever their mother sings them her lullaby. Finally, they reveal the reason for their longing: They are enduring some hardship, which is why they crave their mother's lullaby. In the final line, the singer addresses their mother, wishing that they could sleep again in their old cradle.

== Recordings ==
The song was originally intended to be an artsong, and as a result some of its first performers were the baritone Aurelio Estanislao and soprano Evelyn Mandac. Since then, it has been performed and recorded by various singers and singing groups, including Pilita Corrales (who frequently performs the works of Celerio) with Jackie Lou Blanco, Kuh Ledesma, Lea Salonga, Ice Seguerra and Regine Velasquez. The song is also part of soundtrack of the 2001 Filipino film Abakada... Ina and it was performed by the Filipino band Jeremiah. It was also performed by Christian Bautista during the funeral of former president Corazon Aquino in 2009. In 2017, Corrales and Blanco together with Corrales' son, Ramon Christopher Gutierrez, sang the song at a concert entitled An Evening with Pilita.
