= José Canseco Jr. =

Filipino composer and bandmaster

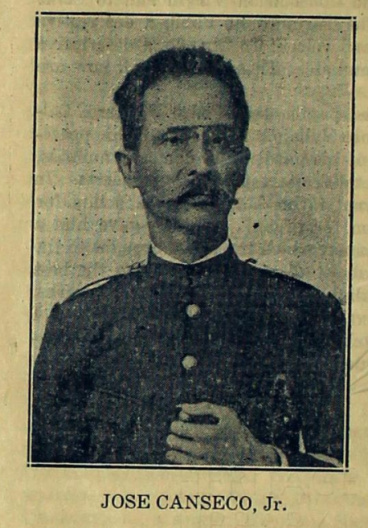
- Canseco in a 1924 book
- Born: 1843; Intramuros, Manila, Captaincy General of the Philippines, Spanish Empire
- Died: 12 June 1902 (aged 58–59)
- Occupation(s): Composer and bandmaster

José Canseco y Rivera del Poso, more commonly known as José Canseco, Jr. (1843 – June 12, 1902), (Note: Other sources claimed that Jose Canseco, Jr. was born in 1839 (University of the Philippines-Diliman) while other sources claimed he died in 1912 (National Commission for Culture and the Arts). The article followed the 1924 publication of his biography due to the time period being near to when the composer actually died.) was a Filipino composer and bandmaster. He was known to be a prominent native music composer during the Spanish colonial period of the late 19th century.

== Biography ==
=== Early life and education ===
José Canseco, Jr. was born in Intramuros, Manila in 1843 to José Canseco and Cecilia Rivera del Poso. He attended the Saint Augustin convent where he was trained as a choirboy. He later joined the band, Spanish Regiment no. 8, at the recommendation of his friend to escape an arranged marriage by the Augustinian friars to a young girl. He was discharged afterwards due to a petition of his mother to the Captain-General for dismissal without her consent.

=== Career ===
Being a talented musician, he was granted position as a tenor singer at the Manila Cathedral. During his time there, he composed an original hymn titled, "Sta. Teresa doctora, sed mi protectora" to be submitted in a music contest. The judges at the contest assumed it was a work of a Spaniard but was later revealed to be a work of a native. The prize distribution was awarded to him in the Archbishop's Palace on October 15, 1882. As conductor, he conducted the full orchestra and voices in 1886 at Pandacan Church. He married Francisca Espíritu in 1881.

In 1891, he passed a competitive examination for bandmasters. As a result, he succeeded Lázaro Concepción being a leader of the band, Spanish Regiment No. 17. He then brought his family to Zamboanga and Ilagan in the island of Mindanao where his children were born.

Canseco made a collection of Filipino folksongs during the second half of the 19th century.

== Philippine Revolution ==
In 1898, Canseco was arrested during his time as bandmaster at Ilagan due to suspicions he might have connections to revolutionary leader Rosalio Silos in Mindanao. He then left Ilagan and went to Cagayán de Misamis.

In 1899, at the beginning of the Philippine-American War, he was requested by the revolutionary government to commission a lump sum of 100,000 pesos to General Emilio Aguinaldo to fund Filipino forces. Unfortunately, because Filipinos were losing the battle against Americans in Luzon, he later returned the money to the treasury of Cagayán de Misamis.

== Death and legacy ==
Canseco soon retired being bandmaster, instead, pursued teaching harmony, composition, and solfeggio. He also dedicated his time composing marches, sacred hymns, and completed a score for a Spanish zarzuela by Ronderos. He died on June 12, 1902. According to Raymundo C. Bañas, his death "was felt by the music lovers of Orpheus" . His family presented his last composition, "Tonopsis mecanica", in 1904 where it won a gold medal at the St. Louis Exposition.
