= Bobby Enriquez =

Filipino jazz pianist (1943–1996)

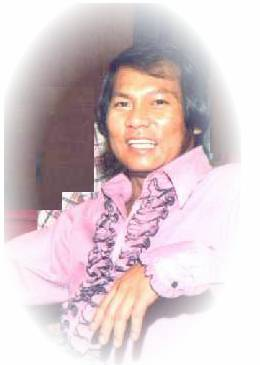

Background information
- Born: Roberto Delprado Yulo Enriquez; May 20, 1943; Bacolod, Negros Occidental, Commonwealth of the Philippines
- Died: August 6, 1996 (aged 53) Stayton, Oregon, Oregon, U.S.
- Genres: Jazz
- Occupation: Musician
- Instrument: Piano
- Years active: 1957–1993
- Label: GNP Crescendo

Roberto Delprado Yulo "Bobby" Enriquez (May 20, 1943 – August 6, 1996) was a Filipino jazz pianist. He was called "the Wildman" due to his energetic playing style.

== Life ==
Born in Bacolod, Negros Occidental, Enriquez's first love was the piano, and he was self-taught since he was four years old; however, his mother wanted him to concentrate on schoolwork. He began his professional career as a musician at the age of 14, sneaking out of his second floor bedroom window at night to play gigs. When his mother discovered what he was doing, she shut down the piano and told him to concentrate on homework.

He soon ran away from home and went to Manila. In Manila, he joined jazz groups, and from there, he played in Taipei and Hong Kong where he met Mel Tormé, Lionel Hampton, Tito Puente, and Chico Hamilton. He got a job at the Golden Dragon Lounge in Honolulu, Hawaii. There, he became music director for Don Ho. From 1976 to 1977, he performed with Amapola Cabase in San Francisco, California. This was followed by appearances at the Wagon Wheel and Harrah's Hotel in Lake Tahoe, Nevada.

From 1980 to 1981, he was a sideman for Richie Cole on tour. During the next four years, he made several albums for GNP Crescendo.

Enriquez became a born-again Christian in 1993 and spoke of how God had changed his life. He played jazzy hymns at his church in Bayonne, New Jersey.

He died on August 6, 1996, aged 53, in Stayton, Oregon, due to a pulmonary embolism.

== Discography ==
=== As leader ===
Year recorded	Title	Label	Personnel/Notes
1981	The Wild Man	GNP Crescendo	with Abraham Laboriel (bass guitar), Alex Acuña (drums), Poncho Sanchez (conga), Chuck Domanico (bass), Harvey Mason (drums)
1981	The Wild Man Meets the Madman	GNP Crescendo	with Richie Cole
1982	Live! in Tokyo	GNP Crescendo	with Isoo Fukui (bass), Shinji Mori (drums)
1982	Bobby Enriquez Plays Bossa Nova	GNP Crescendo	with Rufus Reid (bass), Billy Higgins (drums)
1982	España	GNP Crescendo	with orchestra
1983	Live at Concerts by the Sea	GNP Crescendo	with Richard Reid (bass), Alex Acuña (drums)
1984	Live at Concerts by the Sea, Vol. II	GNP Crescendo	with Richard Reid (bass), Alex Acuña (drums)
1985	Native	Portrait	
1987	Wild Piano	Portrait	with Eddie Gomez (bass), Al Foster (drums)
1990	The Wildman Returns	Evidence	with Ray Brown (bass), Al Foster (drums)
1993	In The City	Portrait	

=== As sideman ===
With Maria Amapola Cabase

- Sophisticated Lady (1984)
