= Lucio San Pedro =

Filipino composer and teacher

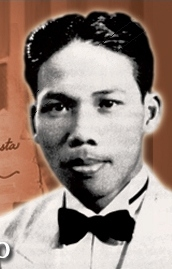
- Born: Lucio Diestro San Pedro. Sr. February 11, 1913; Angono, Rizal, Insular Government of the Philippine Islands, U.S.
- Died: March 31, 2002 (aged 89); Angono, Rizal, Philippines
- Resting place: Angono Catholic Cemetery
- Other name: LDSP
- Occupations: Composer, teacher, conductor
- Known for: National Artist of the Philippines for Music, composer of hymns like Nuestro Padre Jesús Nazareno
- Spouse: Gertrudes Díaz
- Children: 5
- Parents: Elpidio San Pedro (father); Soledad Diestro (mother)
- Awards: Order of National Artists of the Philippines

Lucio Diestro San Pedro, Sr. (February 11, 1913 – March 31, 2002) was a Filipino composer and teacher who was proclaimed a National Artist of the Philippines for Music in 1991. Today, he is remembered for his contribution to the development of Filipino regional band music and for his well-known compositions such as the Filipino lullaby, "Sa Ugoy ng Duyan" and the symphonic poem, "Lahing Kayumanggi".

== Career ==
San Pedro came from a family with musical roots and he began his career early. When he was still young, he succeeded his deceased grandfather as the local church organist. By then, he had already composed songs, hymns and two complete masses for voices and orchestra. After studying with several prominent musicians in the Philippines, he took advanced composition training with Bernard Wagenaar of the Netherlands. He also studied harmony and orchestration under Vittorio Giannini and took classes at Juilliard in 1947.

His other vocation was teaching. He has taught at the Ateneo de Manila University, virtually all the major music conservatories in Manila, and at the College of Music of the University of the Philippines, Diliman, where he retired as a full professor in 1978. He later received the title professor emeritus from the university in 1979. He also became a faculty member of the Centro Escolar University Conservatory of Music in Manila. San Pedro was known for composing the official march of Makati.

== National Artist ==
On May 9, 1991, President Corazon C. Aquino proclaimed San Pedro a National Artist of the Philippines for Music.

== Personal life ==
He married Gertrudes Diaz San Pedro with whom he had five children: Ma.Rhodora Soledad, Bienvenido, Ma.Conchita, Ma.Khristina and Lucio Jr.

== Death ==
San Pedro died of cardiac arrest on March 31, 2002, in Angono, Rizal, at the age of 89. Many peers from the Order of National Artists attended his tribute at the Tanghalang Pambansa, including: Napoleon Abueva, Daisy Avellana, Leonor Goquingco, Nick Joaquín, Arturo Luz, José Maceda, and Andrea Veneración. He is buried in his hometown of Angono, Rizal.

== Works ==
San Pedro's works include a great variety of musical forms ranging from band music, concertos for violin and orchestra, choral works, cantatas, chamber music, and songs for solo voice. He also served as a conductor of many Filipino bands such as Peng Kong Grand Mason Concert Band, the San Pedro Band of Angono, and the Banda Angono Numero Uno.

Major Works

- The Devil's Bridge
- Malakas at Maganda Overture
- Lulay
- Sa Ugoy ng Duyan (with the collaboration of Levi Celerio)
- Dance of the Fairies
- Lahing Kayumanggi

Compositional Philosophy

San Pedro is known for advocating "creative nationalism" when composing his own music. According to him, representing Filipino identity doesn't just fall from literally using the material from folk songs but rather getting the most important essence, style and common touch of being a Filipino. A good example of his "creative nationalism" was his "Lahing Kayumanggi" where he dedicated this piece to "the heroic struggle of the Filipino people for liberation from colonization."

I have always attempted to immortalize the virtues and aspirations of the masses whom I believe are the pillars of the nation. I have placed them on a pedestal for everyone to emulate, and putting them on a pedestal is not an easy task. I want them to be revered, and, as such, the manner of emulating them cannot be done through a vulgar approach, but rather through utmost creativity.
