= Aliw Awards =

Annual entertainment awards in the Philippines

- Awarded for: Excellence in live entertainment
- Country: Philippines
- Presented by: Aliw Awards Foundation, Inc.
- First award: 1977

The Aliw Awards are annual honors presented by the Aliw Awards Foundation, Inc. (AAFI) in the Philippines to recognize excellence in live entertainment. Established in 1976 by journalist Alice H. Reyes under the auspices of the National Press Club of the Philippines, the awards celebrate outstanding achievements in concerts, theater, dance, comedy, hosting, and other forms of live performance. The first Aliw Awards ceremony was held in 1977.

== History ==
The idea for the Aliw Awards originated in 1975, when journalist Alice H. Reyes sought to establish a formal recognition system for Filipino live entertainers, who at the time were largely overlooked by existing film and music award-giving bodies. Supported by the National Press Club, the inaugural ceremony took place two years later, highlighting performers in nightclubs, theaters, and concert halls across Metro Manila.

== Categories ==
As of recent editions, the Aliw Awards feature over fifty competitive categories, encompassing a wide range of live entertainment disciplines. Major categories typically include:

- Entertainer of the Year
- Best Major Concert (Male/Female/Group)
- Best New Artist (Male/Female)
- Best Musical Production
- Best Play
- Best Classical Performer
- Best Dance Production
- Best Stand-up Comedian
- Best Television Event Host
- Best Cultural Performance

In addition to these, the Hall of Fame and Lifetime Achievement Awards honor individuals who have won multiple times or made sustained contributions to the performing arts.

== Ceremony ==
The Aliw Awards are traditionally held annually in Manila, with venues including the Manila Hotel Fiesta Pavilion, the Tanghalang Nicanor Abelardo (CCP Main Theater), and other cultural centers. The event is attended by performers, industry leaders, journalists, and government officials.

== Notable recipients ==
Numerous prominent Filipino artists have received Aliw Awards throughout the years, including:

- Lea Salonga – multiple-time recipient and Hall of Fame inductee
- Regine Velasquez – Entertainer of the Year (1990s–2000s)
- Johnny Alegre – awarded as Best Instrumentalist
- Gerald Santos – Entertainer of the Year

== See also ==
- FAMAS Awards
- Gawad Urian Awards
- Order of National Artists of the Philippines
