= List of Philippine-based music groups =

This is a list of notable Philippine-based choirs, orchestras and musical bands. Bands listed fall under any of these main Philippine music styles: Philippine folk, Manila sound, Pinoy reggae, Pinoy pop, Pinoy rock and Pinoy hip hop, as well as the jazz and ska music genres.

== Choirs ==
- Adventist University of the Philippines Ambassadors
- Alicia Bamboo Ensemble
- Boscorale
- Bukas Palad Music Ministry
- Bukidnon State University Chorale
- Central Philippine University Bahandi Singers
- Chinese Friends of the Jesuit
- Chorus Paulinus
- Chorus Philippines
- De La Salle Zobel Chorale
- Hangad
- Imusicapella
- Las Piñas Boys Choir
- Mabuhay Singers
- Mapua Cardinal Singers
- PLM Rondalla
- Polytechnic University of the Philippines Laboratory High School Chorale
- San Miguel Master Chorale
- Saringhimig Singers
- The HiMiG Gospel Singers
- Tiples de Santo Domingo
- University of the East Chorale
- University of the Philippines Concert Chorus
- University of the Philippines Madrigal Singers
- University of the Philippines Manila Chorale
- University of the Philippines Singing Ambassadors
- University of Santo Tomas Singers
- Vox Angeli Children's Choir

== Folk ==
- Asin (folk rock)
- Humanfolk
- Munimuni
- Banda Kawayan Pilipinas

== Hip hop ==
- Crazy as Pinoy
- Death Threat
- Ex Battalion
- Q-York
- Salbakuta

== Jazz ==
- Johnny Alegre Affinity
- Radioactive Sago Project
- Sinosikat? (jazz funk)

== Manila sound ==
- APO Hiking Society
- Boyfriends
- Cinderella
- Hagibis
- Hotdog
- VST & Company
- Juan de la Cruz Band

== Orchestras ==
- ABS-CBN Philharmonic Orchestra
- De La Salle Zobel Symphony Orchestra
- FILharmoniKA
- Manila Philharmonic Orchestra
- Manila Symphony Orchestra
- Philippine Philharmonic Orchestra
- San Miguel Foundation for the Performing Arts
- San Miguel Philharmonic Orchestra

== Parody ==
- Kamote Club

== Pop ==
- 17:28
- 1:43
- 1st.One
- 3rd Avenue
- 4th Impact
- Six Part Invention
- Alamat
- April Boys
- Baby Blue
- BGYO
- Bini
- Ben&Ben
- Boyband PH
- Down to Mars
- Dv8
- Eurasia
- Freestyle
- G22
- Gimme 5
- Hori7on
- Introvoys
- Kitty Girls
- KAIA
- Krissy & Ericka
- La Diva
- Maasinhon Trio
- MNL48
- Mocha Girls
- MYMP
- Neocolours
- New Id
- Nexxus
- Pluus
- Press Hit Play
- Pop Girls
- Reycard Duet
- SB19
- SexBomb Girls
- Side A
- Smokey Mountain
- South Border
- Sugarpop
- The Company
- Top One Project
- TNT Boys
- Viva Hot Babes
- VVINK
- Xonara
- XLR8
- YGIG

== Reggae ==
- Brownman Revival
- Grin Department
- Junior Kilat
- The Chongkeys
- Tropical Depression

== Rock ==
- 6cyclemind
- Aegis
- AfterImage
- Alamid
- Ang Bandang Shirley
- Apartel
- Arcadia
- Autotelic
- Bamboo
- Barbie's Cradle
- Bethany
- Brisom
- Callalily
- Cambio
- Cheats
- Chicosci
- Cover Me Quick!
- Cueshé
- Curbside
- Cup of Joe (band)
- Dead Ends
- Death By Stereo
- December Avenue
- Dominion
- Dicta License
- Dilaw
- Eevee
- Eraserheads
- Firefly
- Fitterkarma
- Franco
- General Luna
- Greyhoundz
- Hale
- Hastang
- Hey Moonshine
- Hilera
- Hungry Young Poets
- I Belong to the Zoo
- Imago
- Introvoys
- Itchyworms
- IV of Spades
- Jensen and The Flips
- Juan Karlos
- Juan de la Cruz Band
- Join the Club
- Kala
- Kapatid
- Kamikazee
- Kampon
- Kjwan
- Lola Amour
- Lokomotiv
- Mayonnaise
- MilesExperience
- Missing Filemon
- Mojofly
- Moonstar88
- Narda
- Neocolours
- Nuklus
- Oh, Flamingo!
- Orange and Lemons
- Over October
- Paramita
- Parokya ni Edgar
- Pedicab
- Philippine Violators
- Plethora
- P.O.T.
- Prettier Than Pink
- Pupil
- Radioactive Sago Project
- Razorback
- Rivermaya
- Rizal Underground
- Rocksteddy
- Sandwich
- Save Me Hollywood
- Session Road
- Shamrock
- She's Only Sixteen
- Siakol
- Silent Sanctuary
- Slapshock
- Sponge Cola
- Stonefree
- SUD
- Sugarfree
- Suitcase101
- SunKissed Lola
- Taken by Cars
- Tanya Markova
- Teeth
- The Bloomfields
- The Camerawalls
- The Dawn
- The Hi-Jacks
- The Jerks
- The Juans
- The Oktaves
- The Pin-Ups
- The Ransom Collective
- The Vowels They Orbit
- The Wuds
- The Youth
- This Band
- Throw
- TOI
- Tom's Story
- Top Junk
- True Faith
- Turbo Goth
- Typecast
- Unica
- Up Dharma Down
- Urbandub
- Voice of Tranquility
- Wolfgang
- Yano
- Zelle
- Zoo

== Ska ==
- Put3ska

== See also ==
- List of Filipino composers
- List of Filipino singers
- Music in the Philippines
- Pinoy pop
- Pinoy hip hop
- Pinoy reggae
- Manila sound
