= 2025 in Asian music =

== Events ==
- 4–5 January – The 39th Golden Disc Awards are held in Fukuoka, Japan, to recognise achievements in South Korean music. Winners included Aespa and Seventeen.
- 16 January – The PPMF 2024 Ryan Cayabyab Awards ceremony is held at the BGC Arts Center in Manila. The award honors two OPM icons: recipients are singers Celeste Legaspi and Odette Quesada.
- 19 January – The annual Wish 107.5 Music Awards are held at the Araneta Coliseum, Quezon City, Philippines.
- 12 August – Sitar virtuoso Anoushka Shankar stars in a Proms concert at the Royal Albert Hall in London, including the live première of three compositions from her recorded albums.

== Musical films ==
- Dhumketu (Bengali), with music by Anupam Roy, Nilayan Chatterjee and Indraadip Dasgupta
- Rangga & Cinta (Indonesia), with music by Anto Hoed and Melly Goeslaw
- Sinagtala (Philippines), with music by Francis Reyes
- Tu Meri Poori Kahani (Hindi), with music by Anu Malik

== Deaths ==
- 2 January – Ferdi Tayfur, 79, Turkish singer, actor, director, songwriter and screenwriter
- 9 January – P. Jayachandran, 80, Indian playback singer
- 27 January – Emilia Contessa, 67, Indonesian singer and actress (heart attack)
- 2 February – Barbie Hsu, 48, Taiwanese singer and actress (pneumonia)
- 7 February – Song Dae-kwan, 78, South Korean trot singer
- 15 February – Pratul Mukhopadhyay, 82, Indian singer and songwriter
- 21 February – Khalil Fong, 41, Hong Kong singer and songwriter
- 9 March – Garimella Balakrishna Prasad, 76, Indian classical musician and composer
- 11 March – Ayumi Ishida, 76, Japanese actress and singer
- 17 March – Mankombu Gopalakrishnan, 77/78, Indian lyricist
- 25 March – Sanjida Khatun, 91, Bangladeshi musicologist
- 26 March – Shushama Das, 94, Bangladeshi folk singer
- 6 April – Pongsri Woranuch, 85, Thai luk thung singer
- 10 April – Titiek Puspa, 87, Indonesian singer and songwriter
- 12 April – Pilita Corrales, 85, Filipina singer and songwriter
- 27 May – Freddie Aguilar, 72, Filipino musician and singer-songwriter
- 1 July – Hamdan ATT, 79, Indonesian dangdut singer
- 13 July – Yunita Ababiel, 61, Indonesian dangdut singer
- 18 July – M. K. Muthu, 77, Indian actor, playback singer and politician
- 1 August – Arif Babayev, 87, Azerbaijani singer
- 9 August – NoB, 61, Japanese singer (kidney cancer)
- 11 August – Hemanta Dutta, Indian lyricist, 83
- 13 September – Akiko Tsuruga, 58, Japanese jazz musician and composer
- 19 September – Zubeen Garg, 52, multilingual Indian singer and multi-instrumentalist (scuba diving accident)
- 1 October – Thế Hiển, 69, Vietnamese musician
- 21 October – Davey Langit, 38, Filipino singer, songwriter and multi-instrumentalist (spondylodiscitis)
- 3 November – Dipak Sarma, 57, Indian flute player (liver disease)
- 17 November – Humane Sagar, 34, Indian playback singer (liver failure)
- 4 December – Budoy Marabiles, 54, Filipino reggae singer (Junior Kilat)

== See also ==
- 2025 in music
