= Porque =

Porque, Porqué, or Por Qué may refer to:

- "Por Que?", song by Cetu Javu, 1991
- "Porque", song by Maldita, 2011
- "¿Por qué?", song by Miranda, 2013
