= UPMC =

UPMC may refer to:

- University of Pittsburgh Medical Center, United States
- University of the Philippines Manila Chorale
- Pierre and Marie Curie University (Université Pierre-et-Marie-Curie), Paris, France

== See also ==
- UMPC, ultra-mobile personal computer
