= Suitcase (disambiguation) =

A suitcase is a form of luggage.

Suitcase or The Suitcase may also refer to:

== People with nickname ==
- Gary Edwards (ice hockey) (born 1947), Canadian professional ice hockey goaltender
- Bob Seeds (1907–1993), American professional baseball player
- Harry Simpson (1925–1979), American professional baseball player
- Gary Smith (ice hockey) (born 1944), Canadian professional ice hockey goaltender

== Art, entertainment, and media ==
=== Films and television ===
- "The Suitcase" (Mad Men), an episode of the TV series Mad Men

=== Literature ===
- Suitcase, poetry collection by Roger Robinson (poet)
- The Suitcase (novel), 1978 Russian novel by Sergei Dovlatov

=== Music ===
- Suitcase101, a Filipino band

==== Albums ====
- Suitcase (Keb' Mo' album) (2006)
- Suitcase (Neil Arthur album) (1994)
- Suitcase: Failed Experiments and Trashed Aircraft, a 2000 CD box set by Guided by Voices, followed by three further volumes

==== Songs ====
- "Suitcase" a 1971 song by Badfinger from Straight Up
- "Suitcase", a 1980 song by Justin Hayward
- "Suitcase", a 2006 song by Joe Purdy
- "Suitcase", a 2010 song by Charlotte Church from Back to Scratch
- "Suitcase", a 2011 song by Standard Fare
- '"Suitcases", a 2011 song by Dara Maclean
- "Suitcase" (Mary J. Blige song), 2014
- "Suitcase" (Anne Gadegaard song), 2015
- "Suitcase", a 2017 song by Matthew Koma
- "Suitcase", a 2019 song by James TW

=== Periodicals ===
- SUITCASE (magazine), a fashion and travel publication
