= 2025 in Asia =

This is a list of events that took place in Asia in 2025.

== Incumbents ==
=== Afghanistan ===
(Afghanistan)

=== Armenia ===
(Armenia)

=== Azerbaijan ===
(Azerbaijan)

=== Bahrain ===
(Bahrain)

=== Bangladesh ===
(Bangladesh)

=== Bhutan ===
(Bhutan)

=== Brunei ===
(Brunei)

=== Cambodia ===
(Cambodia)

=== China ===
(China)

=== Cyprus ===
(Cyprus)

=== Georgia ===
(Georgia (country))

=== India ===
(India)

=== Indonesia ===
(Indonesia)

=== Iran ===
(Iran)

=== Iraq ===
(Iraq)

=== Israel ===
(Israel)

=== Japan ===
(Japan)

=== Jordan ===
(Jordan)

=== Kazakhstan ===
(Kazakhstan)

=== Kuwait ===
(Kuwait)

=== Kyrgyzstan ===
(Kyrgyzstan)

=== Laos ===
(Laos)

=== Lebanon ===
(Lebanon)

=== Malaysia ===
(Malaysia)

=== Maldives ===
(Maldives)

=== Mongolia ===
(Mongolia)

=== Myanmar ===
(Myanmar)

=== Nepal ===
(Nepal)

=== North Korea ===
(North Korea)

=== Oman ===
(Oman)

=== Pakistan ===
(Pakistan)

=== Palestine ===
(Palestine)

=== Philippines ===
(Philippines)

=== Qatar ===
(Qatar)

=== Russia ===
(Russia)

=== Saudi Arabia ===
(Saudi Arabia)

=== Singapore ===
(Singapore)

=== South Korea ===
(South Korea)

=== Sri Lanka ===
(Sri Lanka)

=== Syria ===
(Syria)

=== Taiwan ===
(Taiwan)

=== Tajikistan ===
(Tajikistan)

=== Thailand ===
(Thailand)

=== Timor-Leste ===
(Timor-Leste)

=== Turkey ===
(Turkey)

=== Turkmenistan ===
(Turkmenistan)

=== United Arab Emirates ===
(United Arab Emirates)

=== Uzbekistan ===
(Uzbekistan)

=== Vietnam ===
(Vietnam)

=== Yemen ===
(Yemen)

== Events ==
=== January ===
- 7 January – A 7.1 magnitude earthquake strikes the Tibet Autonomous Region of Southwest China, killing at least 126 people, whilst another 201 are injured.

=== February ===
- 6 – 23 February – 2025 AFC U-20 Asian Cup in China
- 7 – 14 February – 2025 Asian Winter Games in China

=== April ===
- 3 – 20 April – 2025 AFC U-17 Asian Cup in Saudi Arabia
- April 13 – October 13 – Expo 2025 in Osaka, Japan.

=== May ===
- 12 May – 2025 Philippine general election
- 27 - 31 May - 2025 Asian Athletics Championships in South Korea

=== July ===
- 13 – 20 July – 2025 FIBA Women's Asia Cup in China

=== August ===
- 5 August – Four people are killed 70+ missing and several others are injured Uttarakhand flash flood in Uttarkashi, Uttarakhand India
- 5 – 17 August – 2025 FIBA Asia Cup in Saudi Arabia
- 7 – 17 August – 2025 World Games in Chengdu, China

=== September ===
- 14 September – 2025 Russian elections

== See also ==
- 2025 in Asian music
- List of state leaders in 2025 § Asia
