= Vox Angeli Children's Choir =

Philippine children's choir

The Vox Angeli Children's Choir is a popular children's choir which originated from the Philippines. The choir is made up boys and girls ages 8 – 15, and it recently established a youth choir for ages 16 and above. The Choir is led by their Conductor, Sir Chris Borela, who is a member of the Madrigal singers, with assistant conductors Sir Jonathan Coo and Sir Sheen Sanchez.

The Vox Angeli Children's Choir is known for being the champions in the Children's Choir category of the Hong Kong International Youth and Children's Choir Festival in 2008. At the same time, the Choir sang with superstar Jackie Chan and represented the Philippines for the opening ceremony of the 2008 Olympics.

== Concerts and competitions ==
Vox Angeli Children's Choir is known for being the champions in the Children's Choir category of the Hong Kong International Youth and Children's Choir Festival in 2008. This Choir not only competes but it holds benefit concerts as well. They worked closely with the University of the Philippines Singing Ambassadors chorale and The Angelos to make a concert: "One Voice" for the benefit of the church. On September 23, 2011, the Choir had a concert entitled: "Bata ang bukas" which aimed to help the Silong Tanglaw Orphanage to stay up and running as they were close to shutting down. Recently, the Choir has been planning to join a competition in Vietnam, and setting a concert at the Music Museum.

== Appearances ==
The Vox Angeli Children's Choir has been appearing in Shows like Umaga Kay Ganda and on special occasions, on Channel 13 for the Program: "Seven Last Words". They have been invited to sing during St. Paul's Chorale Festival: "Look at the World", as well as in different malls all over the Philippines like Landmark, Trinoma, Shangri-La, and many more. They have been in TV program Bandila, for winning the Hong Kong International Youth Festival.

== Awards ==
Year	Award	Competition	Category
2007	1st Runner up	Paskong Pinoy	Children's Choir
2008	Gold C	Hong Kong Youth and Children's Choir Festival	Children's Choir
2008	Silver B	Hong Kong Youth and Children's Choir Festival	Folklore
2009	1st Runner up	Paskong Pinoy	Children's Choir
