= Joy Nilo =

Filipino composer (born 1970)

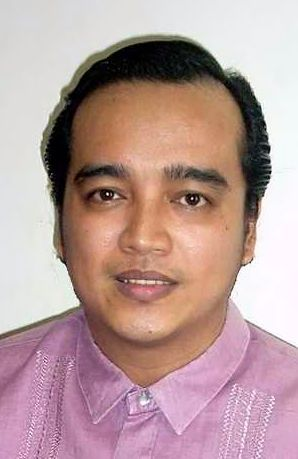

Background information
- Birth name: Joy Tavas Nilo
- Also known as: Tony Val Josia
- Born: January 11, 1970 (age 55); Oriental Mindoro, Philippines
- Origin: Philippines
- Genres: Choral Music, Orchestral, Pop Music
- Occupation(s): Composer, Songwriter, Music Director, Pianist
- Instrument(s): Piano, Voice, Synthesizers, Keyboards
- Years active: 1986–present

Joy T. Nilo (born January 11, 1970) is a Filipino composer who specializes in a cappella choral music. Also an orchestrator, his works range from traditional to modern, ethnic to electronic, serious to popular. He is also a pianist, singer, music conductor and educator.

== Choral music ==
His sacred composition Amami, a suite of 6 anthems based on the Lord’s Prayer, is well known among international choirs, and so are liturgical music such as O Magnum Mysterium, Agtalnaca, Denggem, Apo, Isalacannacam, and Umawit Kayo Sa Panginoon. Philippine Choirs competing internationally sing his contemporary choral compositions and arrangements of folktunes Bongbongtit, Kaisaisa Niyan, Pakawanem Ti Basbasolmi, Duayya Ni Ayat, Pakiusap, Malinac Lay Labi, and Oalay Manoc Con Taraz. His church choir works include Make My Life a Prayer, Glory, Splendor and Majesty, and Come Live in Me.

== Compositions for dance ==
His compositions for dance include Pasyon, Death and . . ., Women Waiting, Reflections on the Death of a Princess, Ballet Pieces Based on Filipino Folktunes, and Filipinescas Suites.

== Theme song compositions ==
Nilo composed various themes for movies such as Kristo, directed by Ben Yalung, and Magnifico, directed by Maryo J de los Reyes. The latter’s theme Ang Aking Munting Bituin, co-composed and interpreted by Gary Valenciano, garnered several awards and nominations from major award-giving bodies in the Philippines. This same song is being used by the soap opera Munting Heredera as its theme song. We Thank You, God gave him the grand prize for Centennial Hymnwriting Competition sponsored by The United Methodist Church in 1998. This was followed by Mary Johnston College of Nursing Centennial Hymnwriting in 2007 for his composition A Century of Nursing Through God’s Faithfulness. His compositions For The Lord's Day and Rejoice, The Lord is King appeared in Singapore's MSM Choral Series. His compositions are being sung and played by different schools and organizations in the Philippines like the FEATI University Hymn, FEATI March, The University of the La Salette Hymn, PSHOA Hymn, International College of Surgeons Hymn, Maternal and Child Nurses Hymn, Amway Philippines, and Caramel Pearl Incorporated.

== Commissioned works ==
Nilo has done commissioned works for the Philippine Philharmonic Orchestra, Technological Institute of the Philippines Choral Society, UST Symphony Orchestra, Manila Symphony and World Youth Orchestra. His choral works are sung by The Philippine Madrigal Singers, Philippine Chamber Singers, The Ateneo College Glee Club, Philippine Chamber Choir, the San Miguel Master Chorale, Loboc Children's Choir, Philippine Children's Choir from Mandaluyong, Ateneo Chamber Singers, University of the East Chorale, Central UMC Festival Choir, Los Cantantes (Cebu) and his own Chorus Philippines.

== Teachers ==
He has studied under Francisco Feliciano, Martin Behrmann, Joel Navarro, Ramon Santos, Jonas Baes, Karl Hochreiter, and National Artist for Music Andrea Veneracion.
