= Patrick Tirano =

Filipino musician and record producer

- Born: 18 June 1983 (age 42); Quezon City, Philippines
- Genres: Rock, blues, world music, jazz, pop, trip hop, pop rock
- Occupations: musician, producer
- Instruments: Guitar, drums, bass

Patrick Darroles Tirano, best known simply as "Pat Tirano", is a Filipino musician and, notably, an audio engineer and record producer. He plays music with numerous acts in the Philippine music scene, including Monkeyspank, Archipelago, Soaked in Scissors, and TOI. As a producer, his most notable works include albums by Sponge Cola, Mayonnaise, Cover Me Quick!, and Pupil's "Beautiful Machines" album, for which he was nominated as "Producer of the Year" in the 2006 NU Rock Awards.

== TOI and other projects ==
In 2007, Patrick Tirano, singer/writer/host Pauline Diaz, and interior designer/visual artist, Mei Tayengco collaborated to form the project TOI, calling it a "plaything created by three minds". Tayengco acted as manager, Tirano did guitars and Diaz supplied the vocals.

Writer Gabrielle De La Rama-Talan, called TOI's music "a compelling, strange and heady mix of blues and jazz." All of the duo's collaboration efforts took place in Wombworks, a record studio founded by bassist Louie Talan, where TOI recorded the album "Fortune's Fool"

Tirano and Diaz eventually got Salamin bassist Miks Bersales and drummer Archie Asistores, and became Toi's "The Goonies". The foursome began to draw the attention of indie fans, while playing actively in local bars like Route 196, Saguijo, Magnet, and 70s Bistro. Soon, the new band recorded a live session at Wombworks aptly called "Toi and The Goonies Live @ The Womb".

In 2008, Tirano became busy engineering and producing Sponge Cola's third record. He is also still currently working with his bands Monkeyspank, TOI and Archipelago in doing other producing stints.
