= Hey Moonshine =

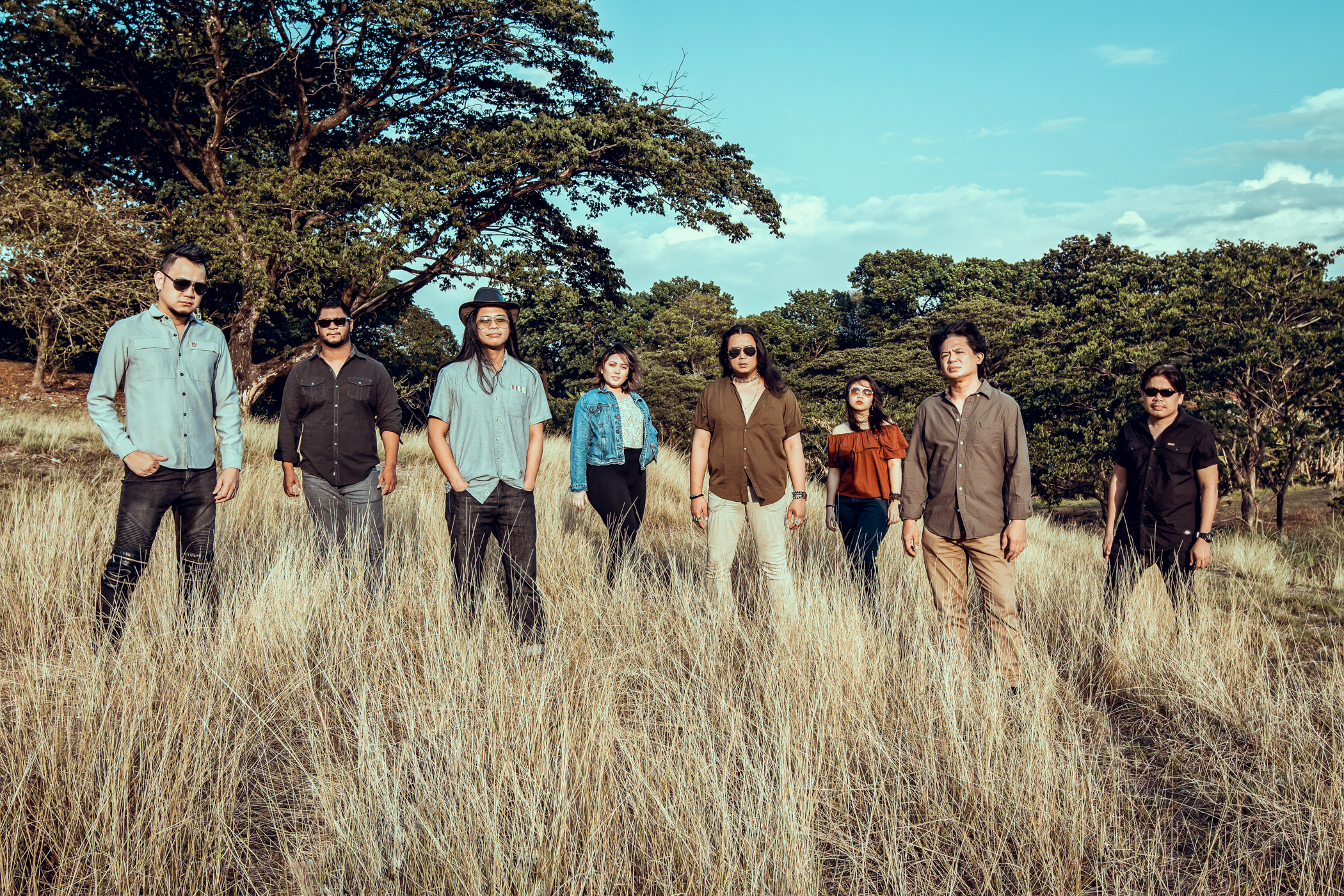

Background information
- Origin: Philippines
- Genres: Southern rock, blues rock
- Years active: 2016-present
- Label: Viva Records
- Members: Gian Sison (vocals, harmonica); Angela Rivera (backup vocals); Athena Mae (backup vocals, guitar); Bryan Gatmaitan (guitar); Aris Sison (guitar); Ton Gregorio (guitar); Carlo Ybanez (bass); Shaun Hilario (drums)

Hey Moonshine is a Filipino rock band whose music is a fusion of southern rock, blues rock and rock 'n' roll. Their lyrics often deal with socially relevant issues like armed conflict and environmental degradation.

== Career ==
=== Formation and early career ===
Hey Moonshine was formed in 2016. Guitarist Bryan Gatmaitan and vocalist Gian Sison met through a common friend. They started out as a five-piece band with Carlo Ybanez on bass, Ton Gregorio on guitar and Shaun Hilario on drums. Their first performance was at the "Concert at the Park" in Rizal Park, Manila. After a visit to the United States by Gatmaitan, Aris Sison was added to the band as a guitarist. The band then decided to expound on their southern, soulful sound by including two female back-up vocalists Angela Rivera and later on, Athena Mae. Early in their career, they played in different local bars and several events such as the Fete De La Musique.

=== Signing with Viva Records ===
In September 2019, Hey Moonshine was signed under Viva Records. The band digitally released three of their songs under this label: We’ll Break This War, Do Voodoo and Peace Sign.

=== We'll Break This War ===
After their signing with Viva Records, Hey Moonshine recorded a new version of We'll Break This War, which was launched in Alchemy Bistro Bar in Poblacion, Makati in October 2019. In February 2020, the band released a music video for the song We’ll Break This War, which was directed by award-winning Director Arvin Belarmino and featured veteran actors Raul Morit and Erlinda Villalobos along with up-and-coming actors Coleen Perez and Bodson Lefoi Reyes. The music video was launched at El Chante Manila in Poblacion, Makati in Metro Manila, Philippines.

=== Song releases in 2020 ===
Aside from We'll Break This War, Hey Moonshine released six other singles in 2020: Ilang Beses, Astig Ka Dude, Wicked Man, Peace Riot, Mercy and Ilang Beses (feat. Sheryn Regis)

=== Simulan Mo Na ===
After a short hiatus owing to the Pandemic, Hey Moonshine launched their new song "Simulan Mo Na" as a call to action against corruption and dishonesty Hosted by Gina Donato of Iskoolmates, the launch was attended by music legends Dong Abay Music Organization (D.A.M.O.) and Color It Red as well as Rock Icon Piranha Philippines, blues band Bita and the Botflies, and Nica Del Rosario who shared their music. Also in attendance were Teddy Baguilat and Atty. Luke Espiritu

== Members ==
The band is composed of professionals by day. Bass Player Carlo Ybanez is a trial lawyer. Backup vocalist Angela Rivera is a medical doctor. Vocalist and Harmonica Player Gian Sison is a Chef. Founder, songwriter and lead guitarist Bryan Gatmaitan is an engineer and so too is guitarist Aris Sison although both are no longer practicing and had chosen to concentrate on music. Backup vocalist and guitarist Athena Mae is a journalist, drummer Shaun Hilario is a teacher while guitarist Ton Gregorio is a web designer.

Some of the members are also veterans in the music scene. Bryan Gatmaitan played for Cynthia Alexander and Shaun was the drummer for Karl Roy.

== Other milestones ==
=== Wicked Man Brew ===
In June 2020, Manila based beer-maker Boondocks Brewery released a beer inspired by one of Hey Moonshine's songs, Wicked Man. Wicked Man is made with locally sourced dalandan and further crafted with modified malts and hops from Kent, England. Beer enthusiasts who reviewed the beer stated that it has a "slight banana aroma, low to medium bitterness with a hint of citrus"; and "upfront citrus aroma, nice color, good head, malty feel and dry finish".

=== Collaboration with Sheryn Regis ===
In 2021, Hey Moonshine collaborated with Sheryn Regis, the Crystal Voice of Asia and released a song entitled Ilang Beses. This song is a remake of Hey Moonshine's single Ilang Beses which they released early 2020 where the band reminded listeners that it doesn't matter how many times you fall, but the number of times you rise above.

== See also ==
- List of Philippine-based music groups
