= The Wuds =

Filipino punk rock band

- Genres: Punk rock
- Years active: 1983–present
- Labels: Twisted Red Cross (1985-1990); Akasha Records (1994); Tone Def (1995-1997)
- Members: Bobby Balingit; Alfred Guevara; Allen Calixto

The Wuds (simply as Wuds) were among the first and most influential punk rock bands in the Philippines. They formed in the 1983 during a time of economic woes and political unrest, which fueled the burgeoning underground punk scene. Along with bands like Third World Chaos, Philippine Violators, Betrayed, and Dead Ends, The Wuds played a significant role in shaping the punk rock landscape in the Philippines.

Their music often featured a blend of punk rock and folk influences, and they were known for their political sound. Despite limited mainstream acceptance and radio airplay, they found loyal support from independent labels like Twisted Red Cross and exposure through events like the Brave New World concerts.

== Career ==
The Wuds released a long-waited debut album, At Nakalimutan ang Diyos ("And God Was Forgotten"), in 1994. Two years later, the group recorded Gera ("War"), an intense record with powerful social and political commentary. The anti-war track "Ang Umibig sa 'Yo" ("To Love You") became a hit on Philippine alternative radio stations. In 1997, the Wuds released "Nakaupo sa Puso" ("Sitting on the Heart").

== Discography ==
=== Albums ===
Title	Label	Catalog No.	Year
Arms Talk	Twisted Red Cross	TRC-05	1985
Oplan Kahon (cassette)	Criminal Records	AK-941	1994
At Nakalimutan ang Diyos (cassette)	Akasha Records	AKCD941	1994
Oplan Kahon (CD)	Akasha Records		1995
At Nakalimutan ang Diyos (CD)	Akasha Records	AK-952	1995
Gera	Tone Def	TDM PC-069	1996
Nakaupo sa Puso	Tone Def	TDM PC-153	1997
Alay (CD)	Redverb Studio	CD-R 80	2019
Alay (cassette)	Backscene Records	BSR01	2019
