= Saringhimig Singers =

Filipino-American choir

The Philippine Saringhimig Singers (magical wings of song) is a Filipino American choir based in San Francisco, California. In the mid 1980s the choir was also known as the Camerata Singers as it toured as a chamber choir throughout Europe

The choir's maestro, George Gemora Hernandez, formed Saringhimig Singers in 1974 at the University of the Philippines together with the other students from the College of Music.

This is a list of the choir's activity and achievements:

2014 – present Reorganized, Series of Concerts

- Concerts in Walnut Creek, San Francisco, Antioch, Fremont, Manteca and Daly City

2008 -2010 Annual Christmas Concerts & Short Performances

- Vallejo, Sunny Vale, Santa Clara and San Francisco

2007 Concert Series

- First California International Choral Festival and Competition, San Luis Obispo Third Place - Choir’s Choice Category
- Concerts in Glendale, Daly City, San Mateo, Stockton

2006 Canadian Concert Tour

- XII International Choral Kathaumixw, Powell River, British Columbia, Canada First Place - Contemporary Choral Music Category Second Place - Adult Mixed Voice Choir Category
- Kathaumixw Concerts Around BC, Maple Ridge
- Concerts in San Mateo, San Francisco
- Annual Christmas Concert

2005 European Concert Tour

- LI International Habaneras and Polyphony Contest, Torrevieja, Spain Third Place - Polyphony Category
- California State Capitol Senate Floor, Sacramento Award of Recognition for “Excellence in Choral Performances in California and Around the World” presented by Senator Torlakson
- Participant, Founders 7th Annual International Choir Festival, Los Angeles
- 2005 World Musikahan with Ryan Cayabyab, Special Guest
- San Francisco City Hall Celebration of Philippine Month, Special Guest
- Concerts in San Francisco, Oakland, Fremont, and Manteca
- Annual Christmas Concert

2004 European Concert Tour

- 58th Llangollen International Musical Eisteddfod, Wales Fifth Place - Both in Chamber Category and Folkloric Category
- XXII Festival Internacional de Musica de Cantonigros, Spain
- Participant, Founders 6th Annual International Choir Festival, Los Angeles
- Concerts in San Francisco, Milpitas, Oakland, Manteca and Los Angeles
- Annual Christmas Concert

2003 Mexico Concert Tour

- IV Festival Mundial de Coros, Puebla, Mexico Voted “Best Choir”
- Concerts in San Francisco, San Jose, Manteca and Milpitas
- Annual Christmas Concert

1996 Germany Concert Tour

- Concerts in different cities in Germany

1994 Spain Concert Tour

- Participant Cant’ Coral de Puig-reig, Spain
- Concerts Different cities in the Catalunya region of Spain

1983 European & Northern American Tour

- Top Prize XXXI Concorso Polifonico Internationale Guido D’Arezzo, Italy Folkloric Category
- Top Prize XXII International Choral Competition, Gorizia – Italy Folkloric Category
- Participant, Cant’ Coral de Puig-reig, Spain
- Concerts Germany, Italy, Spain, Czechoslovakia, United Kingdom, France, Canada, USA

1981 European Tour

- Third Prize Llangollen International Musical Eisteddfod, Wales (Mixed Choir Category)
- Top Prize XXVIII Concorso Polifonico Internationale Guido D’Arezzo, Italy
- Male Choir Category (Ave Maria Male Choir)
- Participant Cant’ Coral de Puig-reig, Spain
- Participant Jornades Musicales Internacionales, Barcelona, Spain
- Participant East Mersea Music Camp, Essex, United Kingdom
- Concerts United Kingdom, Spain, Italy, Germany

1980 European Concert Tour

- Grand Prize Lehiateka Certamen Cancion y Polifonica Vascas, Tolosa, Spain
- Third Prize Llangollen International Musical Eisteddfod, Wales - Folkloric Category (First Philippine Choir to participate in the Eisteddfod)
- Participant Sonnenberg Youth Music Camp, Germany
- Participant Cant’ Coral de Puig-reig, Spain
- Participant Cant’ Coral Barcelona, Spain
- Recording Radio Rundfunk Stuttgart, Germany
- Concerts Spain, United Kingdom, Germany, Austria, Denmark

1979 European Concert Tour

- First Prize XXVII Concorso Polifonico Internationale Guido D’Arezzo, Italy
- Participant Cant’ Coral de Puig-reig, Spain
- Participant XV Dia del Cant’ Coral Barcelona, Spain
- Performance at The World Premiere of Dieter Salbert’s Theaterliche Messe in Ansberg, Germany
- Performance at The 800th year Celebration of the Rhine Cathedral of Cologne, Germany
- Concerts United Kingdom, Germany, Spain, Yugoslavia, Poland, Italy

In 1980 Hernandez also conducted the Ave Maria Male Choral and received the First prize for the male choir category at the XXVIII Concorso Polifonico Internationale, Guido d’ Arezzo, Italy. He restarted the Saringhimig choir in 2002; in 2003 they were voted “Best Choir” in the World Choral Festival in Puebla, Mexico. They also won 4th place at the LLangollen International Musical Eisteddfod in 2004, Third prize at the International Habaneras and Polyphony Contest of Torrevieja, Spain in 2005 and First prize and Second Prize at Kathaumiwx International Choral Competition in Powell River, BC, Canada in 2006. Between 2009-2014 the choir was on a hiatus but since late 2014 the choir is once again active. Their most recent engagement was a music festival during July 2016 in Loreto, Italy
