= Bukidnon State University =

Public university in Bukidnon, Philippines

- Pamantasang Pampamahalaan ng Bukidnon (Filipino); Kinatumhaang Panggamhanan sa Bukidnon (Cebuano)
- Former names: Bukidnon Provincial High School (1924–1929); Bukidnon Normal School (1929–1976); Bukidnon State College (1976–2007)
- Motto: Educate. Innovate. Lead
- Type: State university
- Established: 1924; 102 years ago
- Affiliations: AACCUP; PASUC; MASCUF
- Chairman: Ronald Adamat
- President: Joy Mirasol
- Vice-president: Hazel Jean Abejuala (Academic Affairs); Carina Joane Barroso (Research, Extension and Innovations); Lincoln Tan (Culture, Arts, Sports and Student Services); Dante Victoria, Jr (Administration and Finance)
- Faculty: 650
- Administrative staff: 1500
- Students: 16,000+
- Location: Fortich St., Malaybalay, Bukidnon, Philippines; 8°09′24″N 125°07′25″E
- Campus: 6.0 km² (BukSU Main Campus) (with several Extension and External Studies Center in different parts of Mindanao)
- Colors: Navy Blue; White
- Nickname: BukSU Wild Cats (Note: Main campus only)
- Website: buksu.edu.ph
- Location in Mindanao Location in the Philippines

Bukidnon State University, abbreviated as BSU and colloquially referred to as BukSU, is a provincial state university in Malaybalay City, Bukidnon, Philippines. Formerly named Bukidnon State College, it became a university in 2007. The other university in the province of Bukidnon is Central Mindanao University in Musuan, Maramag.

== History ==
Seal and former logo of Bukidnon State University, still used in some official documents and academic works

Bukidnon State University started as a two-year secondary school named Bukidnon Provincial High School in 1924. In 1928, it offered a four-year secondary normal curriculum and was renamed Bukidnon Normal School (BNS). During that time, it became one of the five full-fledged secondary normal schools in the country. The student population was 70 for the entire four-year secondary course. Although the curriculum is American in orientation, the majority of the students are native inhabitants of Malaybalay. Upon the authority of the Director of Education, William H. Pickell, who was an American school superintendent for Bukidnon, established the school. It was first set up to train elementary school teachers for the provinces of Northern Mindanao and the neighboring regions.

Bukidnon State University

The school was closed on December 9, 1941, due to World War II. It was reactivated on September 1, 1945, but since its facilities were completely damaged, classes were held in army tents at the provincial capitol grounds and in private homes. Rehabilitation work for the school's facilities lasted until the 1950s using the money from the war damage claims.

In 1952–1953, the secondary normal curriculum was phased out giving way to a two-year special education curriculum. The gradual elimination of the secondary education ended in 1956 with the full implementation of the two-year collegiate course. The first batch, comprising nine students, graduated the Bachelor of Science in Elementary Education in March 1957. In the same year, the two-year special curriculum was phased out and the school gained the status of a degree-granting institution. In the same year, a kindergarten school was also established.

In the year 1960, the graduate department was created, offering a master's degree in education to encourage teachers to take advanced studies. Ten years later, external graduate studies centers were organized in a number of provinces and cities outside of Bukidnon in cooperation with the school divisions of the Department of Education to extend the services of the college to working teachers wanted to enroll in courses leading to Master of Arts in education.

On December 15, 1961, Bukidnon Normal School was declared separate school division by virtue of Circular No. 33, s. 1961 issued by the Bureau of Public Schools, thus ending 37 years of administrative control by the division superintendent of schools for Bukidnon. In 1969, Master of Arts was offered in the school and in 1971, a Bachelor of Science in Secondary Education (BSSE) was offered. With the establishment of the BSE in Secondary Education, a high school laboratory, serving as its laboratory school, was established on the same year.

In 1969, Benjamin Tabios, former House Representative of Bukidnon, filed House Bill 18779 proposing the change of the school's name from Bukidnon Normal School to Bukidnon Normal College, but was not enacted. A new bill sponsored by Cesar Fortich, House of Representative of Bukidnon, in 1972 converting the school to a state college—Bukidnon State College—although its conversion was approved, it was cancelled after the declaration of Martial Law in the Philippines on September 21, 1972.

On June 14, 1976, Presidential Decree No. 944 converted the Bukidnon Normal School into a chartered state college and changing its name to Bukidnon State College, together with other schools in the country such as the Cebu Normal School, Leyte Normal School and Northern Luzon Teachers College into chartered state colleges. Jaime M. Gellor was appointed as the first president of the school. He served as president from 1976 to 1986.

The EDSA Revolution saw a change in the leadership of the school. The former president of the school was ousted and replaced by Godofredo L. Ycaro as officer-in-charge of the college. Teresita T. Tumapon was then inaugurated as the new president of the college in December 1986. During her time, linkages were opened for the school both in national and international academic circles. This period of time also saw the improvement of the school's infrastructure, educational facilities, equipment and technology. Foreign experts, brought about by the internal linkages of the college, were brought in the school improving the schools technology and instruction.

On February 1, 1999, Victor M. Barroso, was then appointed as the new school president. The college has five schools offering undergraduate programs: School of Education, School of Arts and Sciences, School of Business Administration and Information Technology and the School of Graduate Studies. The School of Community Education and Industrial Technology and School of Nursing and the School of Law was later established.

On May 15, 2007, during the fiesta celebration of Malaybalay, Gloria Macapagal Arroyo, President of the Philippines, signed Republic Act 9456 converting Bukidnon State College into Bukidnon State University, with endorsement from the House of Representatives and the Senate. BSU formally inaugurated its university status on June 14, 2007.

The university has its own radio station DXBU 104.5.

As of August 26, 2022, there are 16 campuses of the Bukidnon State University system.

On July 23, 2024, the Advancing Research and Technological Innovation Fabrication Laboratory was established at Bukidnon State University. In December, BukSU - Secondary Education Department formed an alliance with the 4DTS Diamond Division in teacher education.

=== Secondary Laboratory School Annex Campus ===
In August 2024, the Secondary Laboratory School was relocated to Barangay Casisang Annex Campus for School Year 2024–2025, from its 50-year-old building. Founded in 1974, the SLS three-story new edifice features security equipment, a gymnasium and a solar power system. SLS Department Head Desiree A. Barroso announced its capacity for 387 junior and senior high school students. Board of Regents Resolution No. 2751, Series of 2024 duly authorized BukSU to retain its senior high school program in the SLS.

== Gallery ==
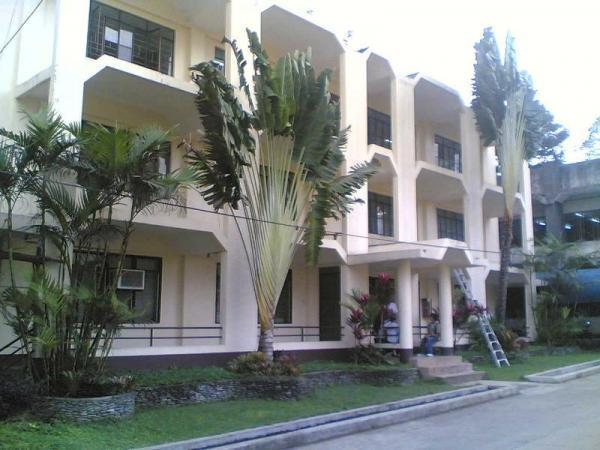
Mathematics And Natural Science Building beside College of Arts and Sciences Building.

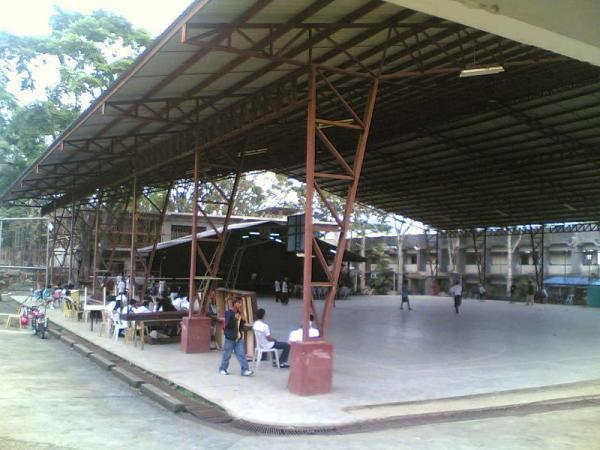
The University Covered Court for Physical Education Course.

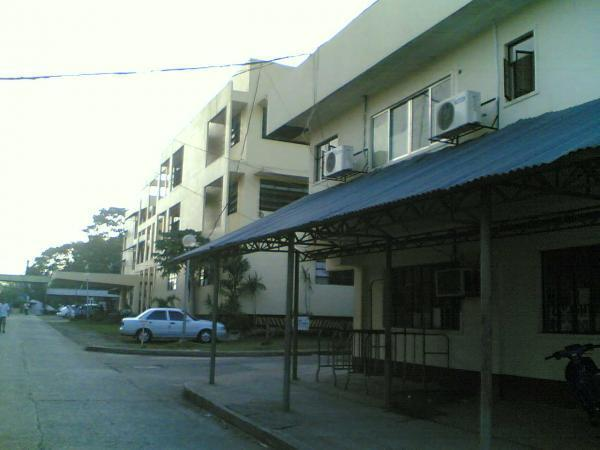
The Data Center in front of College of Education.

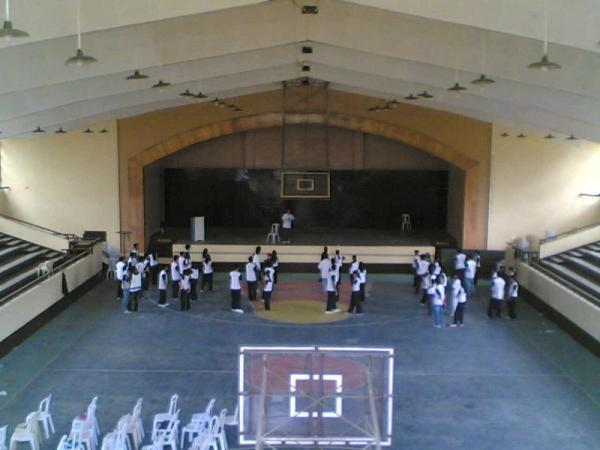
The University Gym.

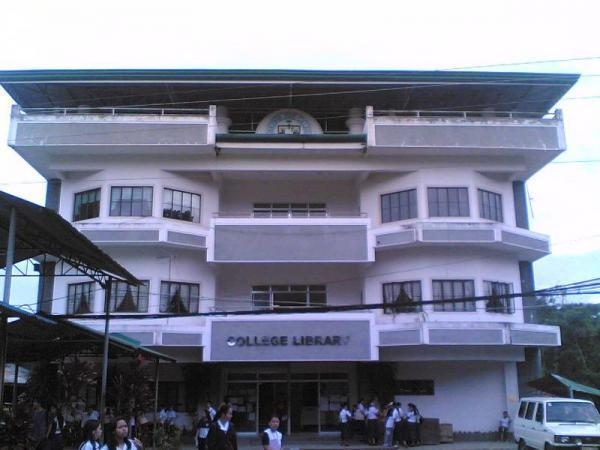
The University Library.

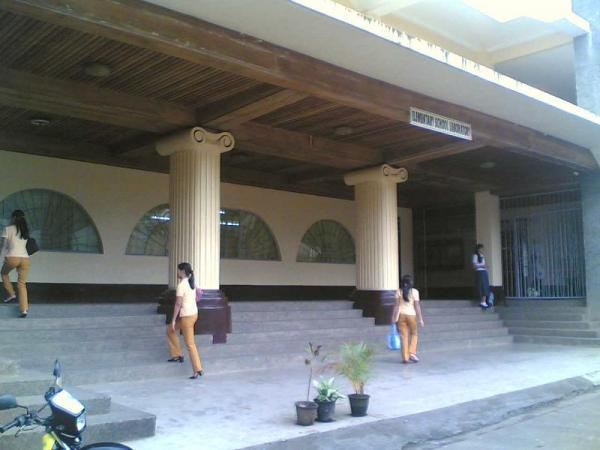
The BSU-Elementary School Laboratory.

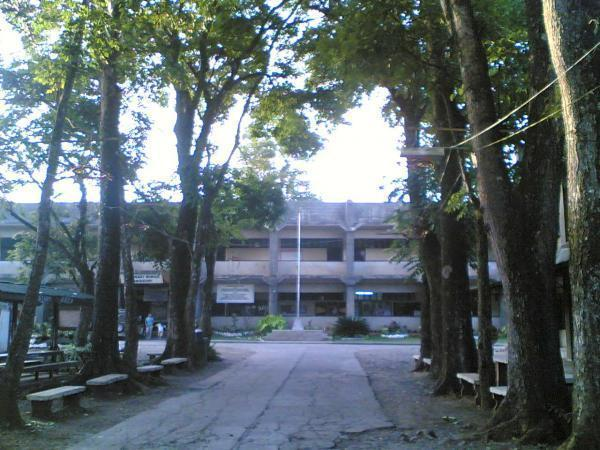
Going to BSU-Secondary School Laboratory.

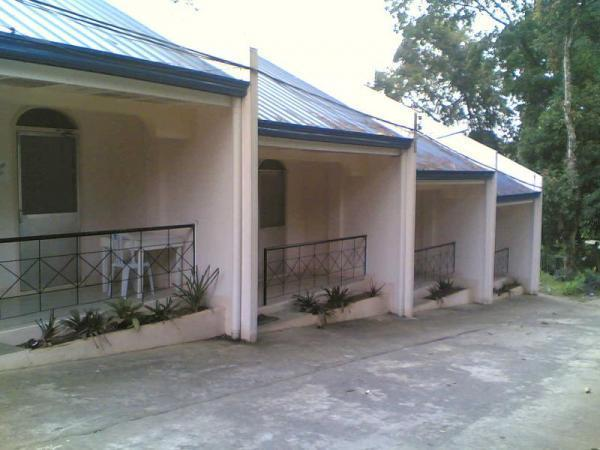
The Guest House Building going to BukSU Valley.

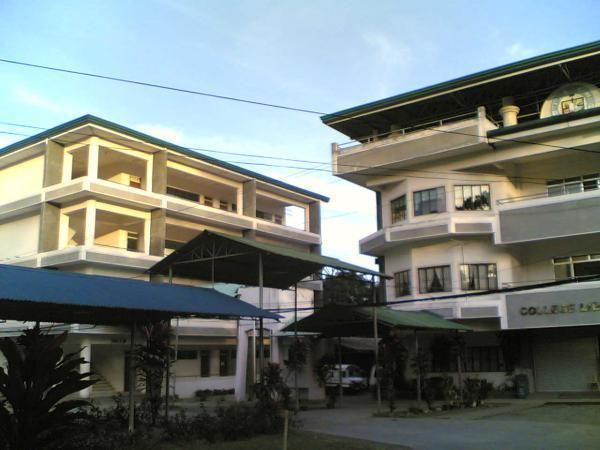
The College of Law beside University Library

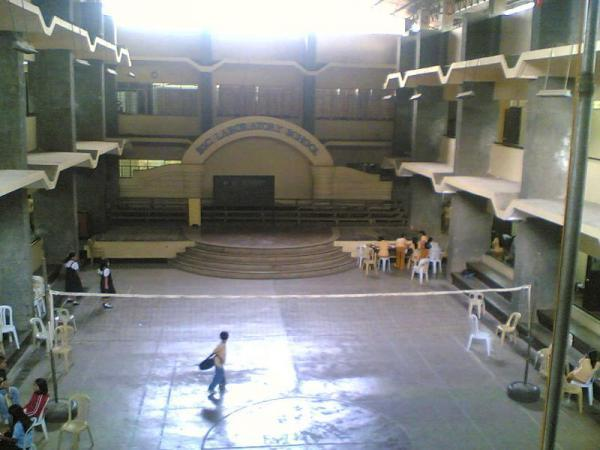
The BukSU-Elementary School laboratory Quadrangle.

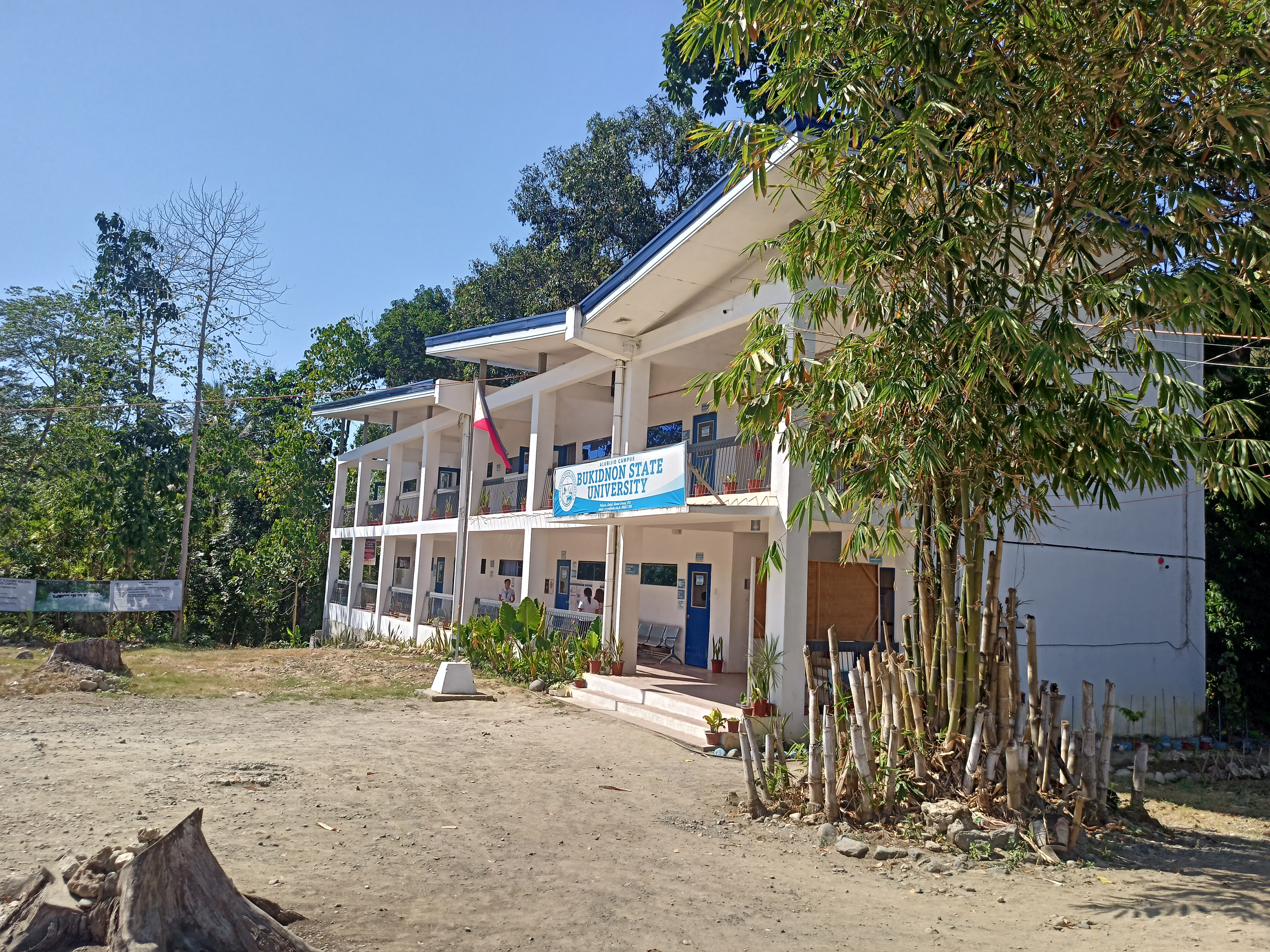
Alubijid Campus

== See also ==
- Bukidnon State University Chorale
