= Blakdyak =

Filipino actor, comedian and singer

Background information
- Also known as: Joey; Blakdyak; Blakjak
- Born: Joseph Amoto Formaran; July 25, 1969; Olongapo, Zambales, Philippines
- Died: November 21, 2016 (aged 47) Sampaloc, Manila, Philippines
- Genres: Pinoy reggae, reggae, pop, novelty
- Occupations: Actor; comedian; singer
- Years active: 1988–2015
- Spouse: Twinkle Estanislao Formaran (d. 2018)

Joey Amoto Formaran, known professionally as Blakdyak (July 25, 1969 – November 21, 2016) was a Filipino actor, comedian and reggae singer. He was known as "The King of Pinoy Reggae".

== Early life ==
Blakdyak was born on July 25, 1969, in Olongapo, Zambales. His Jamaican-American father was a serviceman who was stationed at the former U.S. Naval Base Subic Bay in Olongapo.

== Career ==
Blakdyak started singing in high school in Castillejos, Zambales. He began to earn money from singing when some comedian-performers included him in their shows performing in provinces. He soon migrated to Manila and formed his own band. In 1997, Viva Records discovered him and immediately signed him up to record an album.

With his hit singles "Good Boy" and "Noon at Ngayon", Blakdyak became the first local solo reggae act to achieve success in the entertainment field.

Blakdyak received his first Platinum Record Award for his first album Noon at Ngayon. At the 1998 Awit Awards, he won the award for Best Novelty Act and Best New Male Performer.

== Death ==
Blakdyak was found dead inside his condominium unit in Sampaloc, Manila on November 21, 2016. His head was covered with a plastic bag, but the precise circumstances of his death are unclear. The Manila Police District said there were no evidence of forced entry. However, some of the late singer's possessions were found scattered on the floor. He was subsequently cremated.

== Personal life ==
He was married to Twinkle Estanislao-Formaran, who died on March 31, 2018 from a heart attack.

== Discography ==
=== Studio albums ===
Album	Tracks	Year	Records
Noon at Ngayon	"Noon at Ngayon" "Modelong Charing" "Tugtog Tayo" "Good Boy" "In-Lab" "Carmelita" "Don't Do That Joey" "Kainan" "Confused" "Hayop na Combo"	1997	Viva Records
Magic Kapote	"Good Vibration" "Magic Kapote" "Sing" "Papa" "Dahil Sa'yo" "Kalikasan" "Musika" "Informer" "Shaken Reggae" "Asin at Paminta"	2000	Viva Records
Bumbay	"Summer Reggae" "Bumbay" "Bilin ni Lola" "Inday"	2005	Viva Records
Blakdyak's Tribe	"Sino Ba" "Iska Talong" "Beep Beep" "May Tama" "Tumawa ng Tumawa" "Bilog na Naman ang Buwan" "Hot Mistiso" "Bahay Kubo" "Musika"	2007	Viva Records
May Tama	"May Tama" "Musika" "Kainan" "Good Boy" "Bahay Kubo" "Inday" "Noon at Ngayon "Beep Beep" "Sino Ba" "Modelong Charing" "Iska Talong" "Tumawa Ng Tumawa" "Bumbay" "Summer Reggae"	2013	Viva Records

== Filmography ==
=== Film ===
Year	Title	Role	Notes
1992	Alyas Boy Kano	Michael	
1998	Squala	Overdose	
1998	Gangland	Banjo	
1999	Dahil May Isang Ikaw	Himself	
1999	Asin at Paminta	Himself	
2001	Weyt a Minit, Kapeng Mainit	Ado	
2002	S2pid Luv	Bin	
2004	Masikip Sa Dibdib: The Boobita Rose Story	Himself	Final film appearance
