= Pinoy reggae =

Music genre

- Stylistic origins: Reggae, Pinoy rock, Filipino folk
- Cultural origins: 1990s in Cebu, Manila and Boracay
- Typical instruments: Bass, drums, guitar, organ, brass, melodica

Other topics
- Pinoy rock; Pinoy hip hop; Pinoy pop

Filipino reggae or Pinoy reggae is reggae music created in the Philippines. The country has several bands and sound systems that play reggae and dancehall music in a style faithful to its expression in Jamaica. Reggae in the Philippines comprises the many forms of reggae and its subgenres, and at times combining traditional Filipino forms of music and instruments in their music.

The provinces of Aklan (mainly Boracay Island), Quezon, Pampanga and Pangasinan, Negros Occidental and Negros Oriental, Palawan, Surigao del Norte (mainly Siargao Island) and Marinduque, and the cities of Manila, Cebu and Davao are some of the places that reggae has found a base, with many artists residing in these cities and performing at local bars and clubs. The Visayas section of the Philippines has had the largest concentration of reggae groups, with Cebu City of Central Visayas even being dubbed "The Reggae Capital of the Philippines". In early 2007, Ziggy Marley performed at the MTV Philippines festival, "Reggae Fest by the Bay" in Manila. Marley played with local Filipino reggae talents.

== History ==
Jamaican reggae was introduced to the Philippines in the late 1960s; however the first recognized Filipino reggae bands didn't appear until the late 1970s. Cocojam is known as one of the first Filipino reggae bands. Ska also found its place in the Philippines, with many bands forming, especially in the Visayas region. Cities like Dumaguete and Cebu became the hub of Filipino ska. Dub music also found its place within the islands, with bands like Junior Kilat popularizing the genre with songs like "Sigbin". Local folklore, tales and traditions were a noticeable influence on songs. The subgenre dancehall was popularized in Cebu by Coolie Dread and the Microphone Commanders. Bands like Badjao Roots and Tropical Depression displayed cultural awareness by using traditional instruments in their songs. With the commercial success of groups like Brownman Revival and Tropical Depression, the Filipino reggae scene has seen more popularity, to the point that more reggae festivals are being introduced and expanded around the country.

== Notable Filipino reggae artists ==
=== Manila ===
- Blakdyak
- Brownman Revival
- Tropical Depression

=== Marinduque ===
- Damorions

=== Cebu City ===
- Junior Kilat

=== Davao City ===
- Nairud

=== Bukidnon ===
- Jayson in Town

=== Cotabato ===
- Elias "Elias J. TV" Lintucan

== Reggae radio stations ==
There are a number of radio stations in the Philippines which play reggae music, although few are dedicated solely to the genre. Below is a list of prominent reggae radio stations in the Philippines.

- Doobie Nights (JAM 88.3 FM) Saturdays 6–10pm - Roots, Rock, Reggae (defunct)
- Groove Session (Jam 88.3 FM) Saturdays 3-5pm
- Dread At the Control (DWNU FM) 107.5 FM Thursdays 9–10pm
- Radio Boracay (DYJV, Radio Boracay 106.1)
- Onebeat Dancehall Radio Show DWLA (RJ Underground Radio UR 105.9) Fridays 9–10pm
- GNNFM 101.7 (Cotabato) every Saturday 9pm–12am
- Kaya Radio Online Radio Youtube Afternoon and Midnight Sesh
