= Cover Me Quick! =

Filipino power pop/alternative band

Cover Me Quick/!\
- Origin: Rizal, Philippines
- Genres: Powerpop, Alternative rock, Pop punk
- Years active: 1998–2008
- Labels: Viva Records; Alpha Records/Harmony Music (1st album)
- Members: Box Garchitorena, guitars/vocals Eco Garchitorena, drums/vocals Ernie Bangiban, bass/vocals Erikson Pasamba, guitars/vocals
- Website: www.covermequick.com

Cover Me Quick! (also known as "cover me quick/!\" with the distinctive "/!\" warning sign appended at the end of the name) is a four-piece Power pop/Alternative band from the Philippines. The group's founding members formed the group in 1998 with members Rodel "Box" Garchitorena, Ernesto Bangiban, and Mark Jay Garchitorena.

== Just Add Water and Mayrics stints ==
Highly influenced by the surfacing of acts like Green Day and other widely popular grunge bands, brothers Mark and Box started jamming shortly after acquiring a new guitar and a second-hand drum set. Box urged Ernie, from their high school band "White Lies", to join the band with his brother. The group immediately jumped into joining a slew of Battle of the Bands, making it a point to record demos off the winnings.

Box, who studied at the University of Santo Tomas, stalked booker Sazi Cosino for a stint at Mayric's, which is located right in front of the university. Booked as "Big Cheese" first, the three-piece changed its name just before stepping on stage to "Just Add Water". Thinking that the set sucked, the band quickly changed their name to "Cover Me Quick" for the next gig at the bar. The band thought the name ("Cover Me Quick") could justify the mistakes they commit on stage.

== Early recordings ==
Continuing to win band contests, the trio continued recording and eventually got songs in a CD. The two-song EP contained "To the Girl I Did the Other Night" and "Hija" which were featured on NU 107's show "In The Raw". Francis Brew, the show's host, commented that the songs sounded like "a post Silverchair kind of deal", and added that it was a "well played, well produced" demo. Shortly, cover me quick/!\ was also guested on the "In The Raw" TV show.

Getting gigs across the metro because of the radio and TV exposures, the band continued to record demos. The latest batch of songs, now recorded at Sound Creation studios in Quezon City, became the foundation for what would become the band's debut record.

== "Road Juan" and "Sandali Lang" ==
The band's demo eventually got the attention of local major record label Alpha Music and got them signed in 2001. The next year, "Road Juan" was released with the carrier single "Sandali Lang". The song immediately reached NU 107's popular show "The Midnight Countdown" and peaked at no. 9. These developments resulted in relentless tours across the country and eventually had them lined up on the popular summer gig "Pulp Summer Slam".

== The Shinji Tanaka sessions and live gig hiatus ==
Troubles with their label had the band stop gigging and holing up in Shinji Tanaka's Sound Creation studios where the band continued recording songs. Sessions between 2004-2005 had 15 songs made, but were never released, except for the songs "Sabihin Mo Na Lang", "A Billion" and "Biglang Liko" which were later re-recorded and included in the 2007 album "Mga Kantang Galing Sa Loob Ng Kwarto Ko".

== "Mga Kantang Galing Sa Loob Ng Kwarto Ko" and "Gabi Ng Prom" ==
Struggling to find a core sound, the band started listening to bands Sugarcult, The All-American Rejects, Dashboard Confessional and other Pop punk bands. This resulted in a gearing to a more "Power pop" sound. Finding a loyal fanbase in schools that the band visited. Cover me quick! was signed with Viva Records with help from Mally Paraguya who helped them get a new record deal.

Songs from the new album were recorded at Wombworks Studio in Marikina, where the band met producer Patrick Tirano who also produced records for Sponge Cola, Pupil (band) and Mayonnaise (band). The song is a full collaborative effort from the band, writing-wise, having written equal number of songs for the 10-track sophomore release.

"Tanya, Tanya" was the only song on the album that had the three collaborate on one song. Mark wrote "Fifteen Minutes", "A Billion" and "Sabihin Mo Na Lang", Ernie wrote "Kung Gusto Mo Maraming Paraan, Kung Ayaw Mo Maraming Dahilan", "Biglang Liko" and "Ayoko Na". Box wrote "Ang Huling Kantang Gagawin Ko Para Sa'yo", "Gabi Ng Prom" and "Lagi Kang Tama". Hence, the title of the album which translates to "Songs from my room" in English. The album's official website (now tabbed in the band's new official site) is an interactive flash where you could find lyrics for the 10 songs scattered throughout a house that had three rooms: Ernie's, Mark's and Box's. In the corridor, the lyrics for the carrier single "Tanya, Tanya" is found, but required a pass code from the physical CD to access.

The first single, though unofficial, since it got premature airplay over NU 107 became "Tanya, Tanya". However, months after, the band released a video for the first official single "Gabi Ng Prom" which got decent airplay over local music channels myx and MTV.

== New member, new single, and a third album ==
After the release of its second album, cover me quick/!\ employed the services of a second guitarist in the person of their long-time friend and roadie Erikson Pasamba. Box comments:

I think it has always been a dream for the band to have a fourth member since the band originally meant to have two guitars. Now that we have Erikson, we expect to have a fuller sound,

While flirting with a name change and even releasing singles under the name "My Ex-Girlfriend" over pop radio station 99.5 Hit radio, through the show "The Brewrats", the band recorded a new four-song EP that had the new member doing guitar parts and contributing a song. The four-song effort included a song from each of the members of the band.

On September 30, 2008, the band officially returned to the live circuit through the shoot of an acoustic, live video for the new single "Ang Huling Kantang Gagawin Ko Para Sa'yo" from the album "Mga Kantang Galing Sa Loob Ng Kwarto Ko".

== The making of the new video ==
A new single off the album "Mga Kantang Galing Sa Loob Ng Kwarto Ko" was released by Viva Records through a live video shoot at 6underground in Ortigas Center, Pasig. The song is a different version of the song "Ang Huling Kantang Gagawin Ko Para Sa’yo".

A two-song acoustic set kicked off the two-set gig completed by a remake of their first single, "Gabi Ng Prom".

BoX! said Erikson is working on a song for a new album in the works for the group.

The second part of the set featured the band’s new singles from an album in the works, plus the singles off their current one out in the market. The band also featured their "punked-up" version of Sharon Cuneta’s song "Bituing Walang Ningning".

== Indefinite hiatus, new bands ==
Before the end of 2008, Box announced on their yahoo groups page that the band is taking an indefinite hiatus from live gigs and recording. He also hinted on making music with new band/s.

== Discography ==
=== Studio albums ===
Year	Album
2002	Road Juan (Alpha Records/Harmony Music)
2007	Mga Kantang Galing Sa Loob Ng Kwarto Ko (Viva Records)

=== Compilation albums ===
Year	Album
2003	Acoustic Light (Alpha Records/Harmony Music) - contributed "Tulala", also from the album "Road Juan"
2006	Rock Grooves In Delirious Ways (Alpha Records/Harmony Music) - contributed "Nobody's Shoulder", previously unreleased
