= Toi (band) =

Filipino indie musical band

TOI
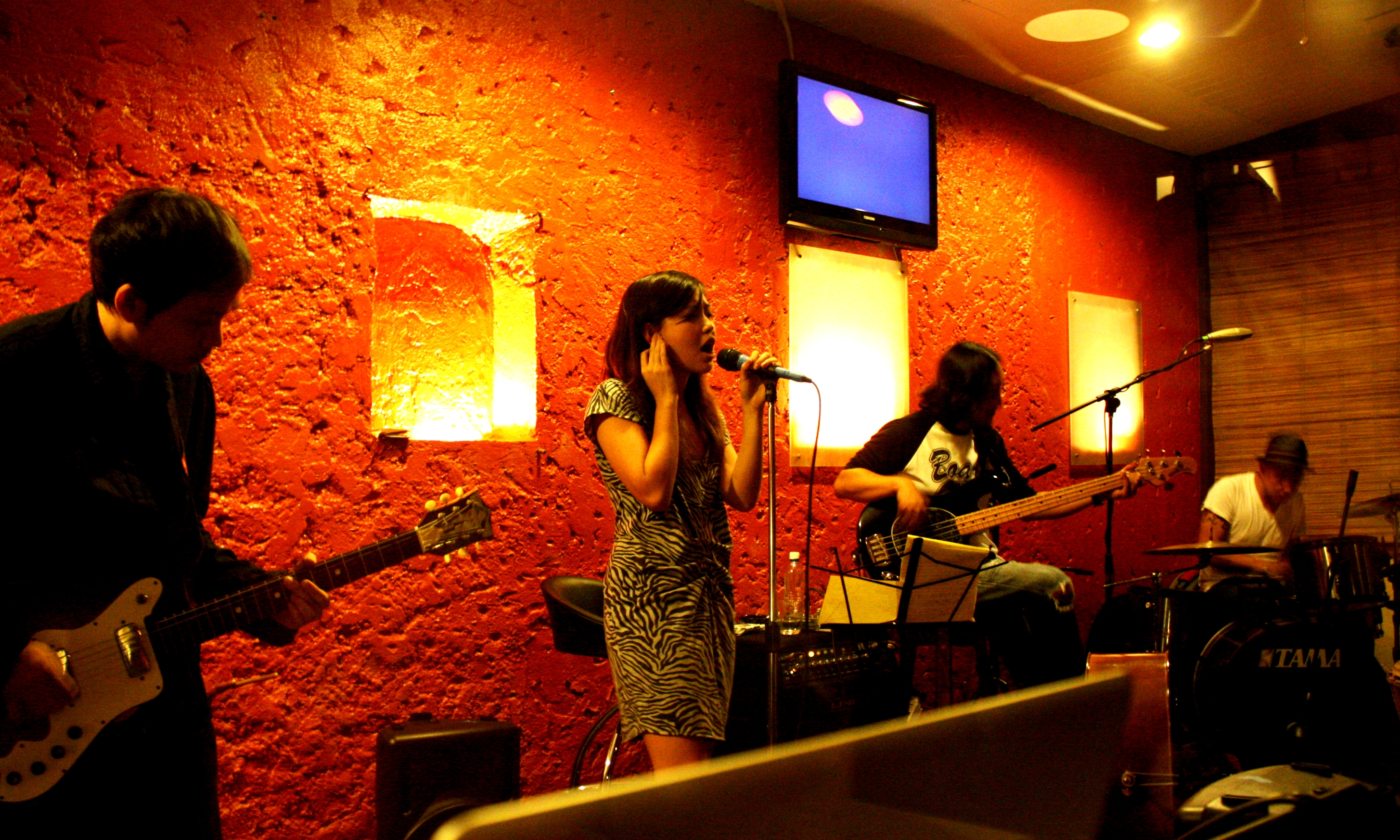
- TOI performing at their September 25, 2010 "The Rehearsal" show at Route 196, Quezon City. Band members shown, left to right, are guitarist Pat Tirano, vocalist Pauline Diaz, bassist Louie Talan, and drummer Wendell Garcia. Not pictured are bassist Rommel Sanchez and manager Mei Tayengco.

Background information
- Origin: Philippines
- Genres: Blues, jazz, folk rock, electronic, experimental
- Years active: 2007–present
- Label: Unsigned/Independent
- Members: Pauline Diaz (vocals); Pat Tirano (guitar); Mei Tayengco (manager/creative director); Romel Sanchez (guitar); Louie Talan (bass); Wendell Garcia (drums); DJ Rodriguez (percussion)
- Website: Website

TOI, pronounced "toy" and sometimes mistakenly referred to by the name of its website "TOI Kingdom", is a Filipino indie musical group whose musical range includes folk rock, blues, jazz, and electronic music, often in some experimental combination. Conceived in 2007 by Mei Tayengco, Pat Tirano and Pauline Diaz, the group was named TOI in acknowledgement of Tayengco’s vision of the group as “a plaything created by three minds.” Tirano and Diaz form the musical core of the band, with numerous other musicians contributing to the band's sound over the years, while Tayengco serves as the band's artistic manager of sorts.

== History ==
TOI was born in 2007 when interior designer and visual artist Mei Tayengco took up the idea of introducing singer Pauline Diaz to guitarist Patrick Tirano, to see if their musical approaches were compatible. At that point, Diaz was already a writer and television show host and Tirano was already a sound engineer and producer at Wombworks Recording Studio in Marikina, and was already doing gigs with other bands.

Diaz recounts:

“We did a test pair-up just to see how it fit, and what came out was a bunch of songs I had written with a whole new depth of sound coming from Pat. It was a pretty cool day.”

The duo started performing their music in the Philippine independent music scene, playing stages like Route 196, Mag:Net Cafe, Saguijo, and 70’s Bistro, earning acclaim for music the Manila Times' Gabrielle De La Rama-Talan described in mid-2008 as "a compelling, strange and heady mix of blues and jazz." Later that year, bassist Miks Bersales and drummer Archie Asistores of Salamin, another Filipino indie act, were recruited to play regularly with TOI. The two came to be known as "The Goonies", differentiating them from TOI's core group of Tirano and Diaz. The foursome recorded a live album at Wombworks which they called "Toi and The Goonies Live @ The Womb". The band distributed the album through personal contacts, and then made it available for download, also putting up videos of the sessions up on YouTube.

2009 and 2010 saw a period of renewed writing and recording for group, and with Asistores and Bersales moving on, new performers joined the TOI lineup. These included Rommel Sanchez backing Tirano up on Guitar, Razorback's Louie Talan on bass, and Pupil's Wendell Garcia on Drums, a supporting lineup that the band has referred to as "The Dream Team."

2010 saw the release of an E.P., "Jack", featuring songs for which the band had become known, such as "Demon", "Armor", and the eponymous title track "Jack." It also included a cover of Radiohead's "Creep." By September of that year the band had released a full-album of sorts called "The Rehearsal," compiling demo material from earlier recordings. "Demon" began getting heavy airplay on prominent Rock radio station NU107. On September 25, 2010, the band topbilled a show of their own, also called "The Rehearsal" at Route 196, which the band indicated was a harbinger of bigger things for the band. Playing with the name of the name of the show, Tirano noted that "this is just The Rehearsal..."

== TOI as an indie band ==
While the group hasn't dismissed the idea of signing up with a label, the band has always embraced its indie status. With all the members - particularly Tirano who is deeply involved in numerous music projects - busy, the members see the band as a more laid-back musical experiment. “We just like what we do," Tirano said in an interview with Fully Booked Magazine, "keeping the music in our heads until it naturally spills out.” Diaz adds that "TOI and our collaboration with other artists was never perceived as work, we have our day jobs for that."

They also point out that it contributes to the quality of their music, and of their performances. Diaz says that it plays "a [big] part in helping us explore our sound," and further says "“You have to mess around with your own stuff, including the band name, before you unleash anything on the world.”

The band points out that even the origin of the band's name is a reminder that the point of putting up a musical group is to play - as Tirano puts it, "to toi around."

== Members ==
=== Founding Members ===
- Pat Tirano - Guitar
- Pauline Diaz - Vocals
- Mei Tayengco - Management

=== Other Members ===
Current

- Romel "Sancho" Sanchez - Guitar
- Louie Talan - Bass
- Wendell Garcia - Drums
- DJ Rodriguez - Percussion

Former/Sessionists

- Miks Bersales - Bass
- Archie Asistores - Drums
- Eo Marcos - Drums
