= Bukidnon State University Chorale =

Philippine premier cultural group

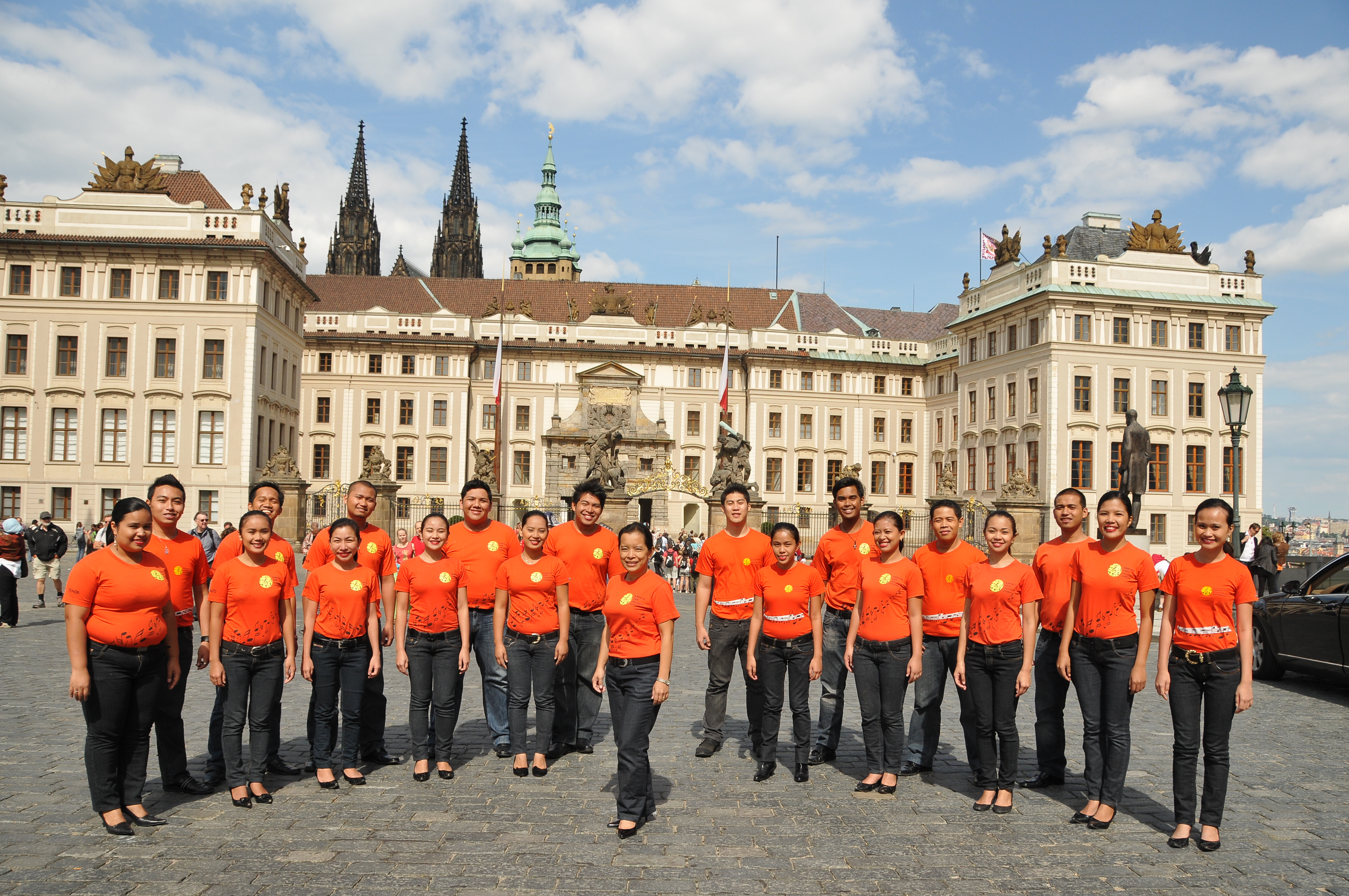

Background information
- Also known as: BSU Chorale
- Origin: Malaybalay, Bukidnon, Philippines
- Genres: Choral music
- Years active: 2001–present
- Members: Mercibelle Barroso-Abejuela (choirmaster, 2001–present)
- Website: Official website

The Bukidnon State University Chorale is the premier cultural group of the Bukidnon State University specializing in Bukidnon indigenous music. It is a mixed choir composed of students and employees of the institution.

The choir represented the Philippines for the 2011 Prague Quadrennial of Performance Design and Space in Prague, Czech Republic on June 16–26, 2011. They also performed at the inauguration of the exhibition of traditional Philippine garments at the Blumentritt-Rizal Bastion in Litoměřice, Czech Republic. They also participated in two celebrations marking the Philippines' 113th Independence Day in Prague, with a diplomatic reception at the Hotel Hilton Celnice and at the Shrine of the Holy Infant Jesus. The chorale unleashed its boundless gifts of talents and brought Philippines to the world stage at through music and dance for the 150th Birthday Celebration of Dr. Jose Rizal at Náměstí Republiky in Prague.

The group is the resident performer at the "Piniliyapan" Cultural Night of the annual Kaamulan Festival in Bukidnon.

== Performances ==
=== International ===
BSU Chorale perform at a park in Prague (photo by Rick Benigno)

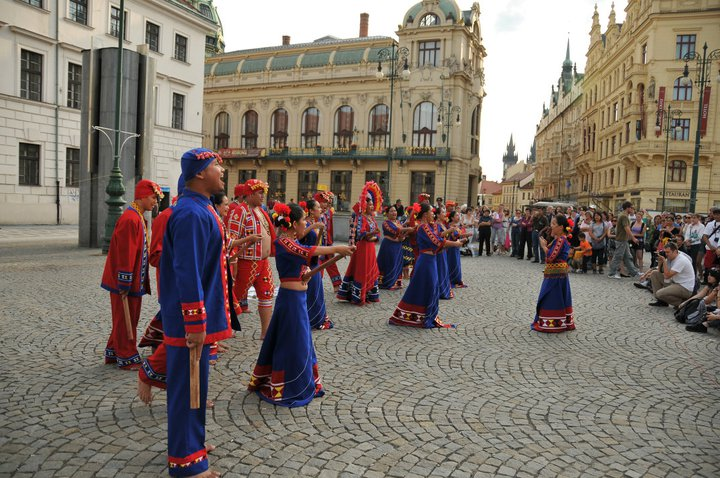
Bukidnon State University Chorale

- Prague Quadrennial Performance Design and Space 2011

Prague, Czech Republic June 2011

- 113th Philippine Independence Day Diplomatic Reception

Hilton Hotel, Prague, Czech Republic June 2011

- 113th Philippine Independence Day

Shrine of the Holy Infant Jesus Czech Republic June 2011

- 150th Birthday Celebration of Dr. Jose Rizal

Namesti Republiky Prague, Czech Republic June 2011

- Traditional Philippine Garments Exhibit

Blumentritt-Rizal Bastion, Litomerice, Czech Republic June 2011

- Philippine Embassy

Prague, Czech Republic June 2011

- Botsshaft der Philippinen, Philippine Embassy

Vienna, Austria July 2011

=== Local ===
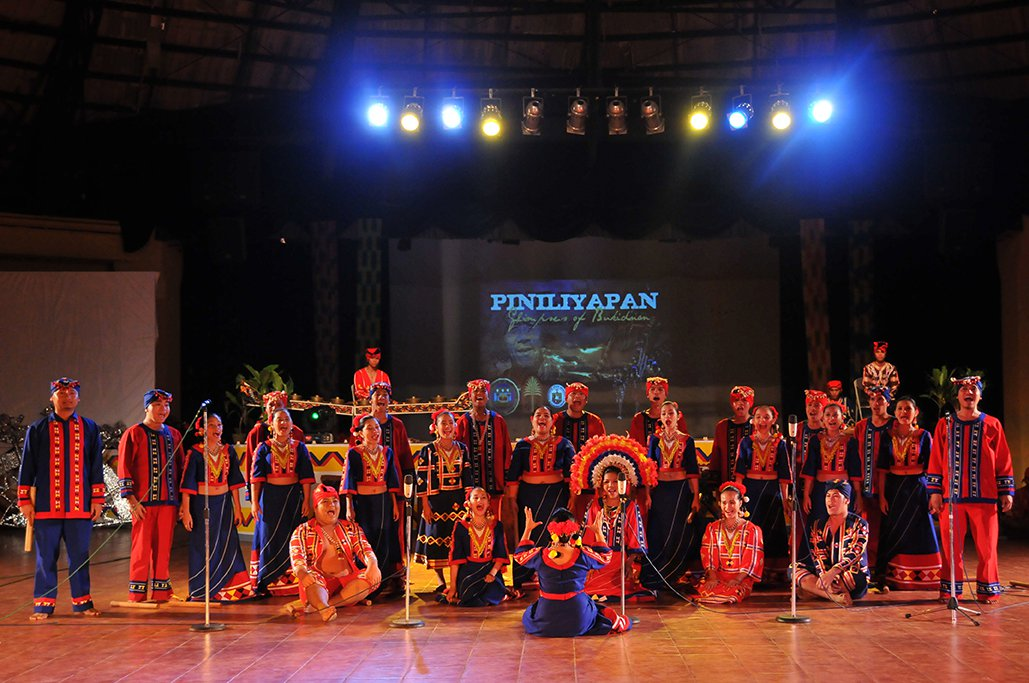
Piniliyapan, Glimpses of Bukidnon

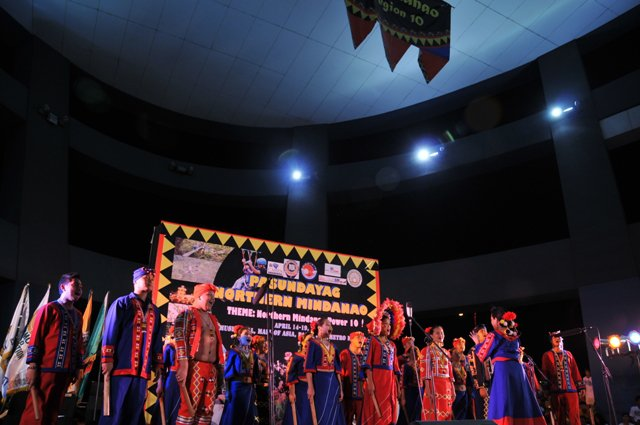
Pasundayag 2011

- Bukidnon State University Chorale in Concert

Bukidnon State University Auditorium, Malaybalay City September 28, 2011

- Reception for His Excellency William Cocks

Assistant of Cultural Affairs of the United States of America in the Philippines Malaybalay City July 2011

- “Sing Unto the Lord, a Thanksgiving Concert”

The Monastery of the Transfiguration, San Jose, Malaybalay City August 2011

- BSU Chorale in Concert

Iligan City April 2011

- Pasundayag 2011

Mall of Asia, Pasay April 2011

- Songs from Kitanglad

Silliman University, Dumaguete City January 2010

- Piniliyapan, Glimpses of Bukidnon 2010 and 2011

Malaybalay City March 2010 & 2011

- ASEAN Festival for Culture and the Arts

Clark Expo, Pampanga March 2010

- KALAHI Cultural Caregiving

Intramuros, Manila March 2010

- Mid-Year PASUC Conference

Grand Men Seng Hotel, Davao City June 2010

- Annual Malaybalay Choral Directors Guild Choral Festival (1st-7th)

Malaybalay City November

- Pasundayag 2009

Clamshell, Intramuros, Manila May 2009

- Department of Foreign Affairs

Roxas Blvd., Pasay, Metro Manila July 2008

- Cebu Normal University

Cebu city December 2008

- Reception for His Excellency Gerard Chesner

Ambassador of France to the Philippines July 2006

== Recognitions ==
Champion

- Mindanao Association of State Tertiary Schools Incorporated 2014 (March) Choral Competition*

March 2014, Bukidnon State University, Malaybalay City

Champion

- Mindanao Association of State Colleges and Universities Foundation 2008 Choral Competition

February 2008, Bukidnon State University, Malaybalay City

Champion

- Mindanao Association of State Colleges and Universities Foundation 2006 Choral Competition**

February 2006, University of Southern Mindanao, Kabacan, North Cotabato

1st Runner-up

- Philippine Association of State Universities and Colleges Cultural Literacy Festival 2008 Choral Competition

July 2008, Philippine Normal University, Taft Avenue, Manila

1st Runner-up

- Philippine Association of State Universities and Colleges Cultural Literacy Festival 2006 Choral Competition

July 2006, Bulacan State University, Malolos, Bulacan

*There were two competitions held by the Mindanao Association of State Tertiary Schools Incorporated in 2014. One was in March 2014 held at Malaybalay City, Bukidnon; while the second one was in November 2014 held at Mati City, Davao Oriental. It was also the former Mindanao Association of State Universities and Colleges and Universities Foundation which was rebranded at the same year.

**Tied with University of Southern Mindanao Chorale in 2006

== Choir director ==
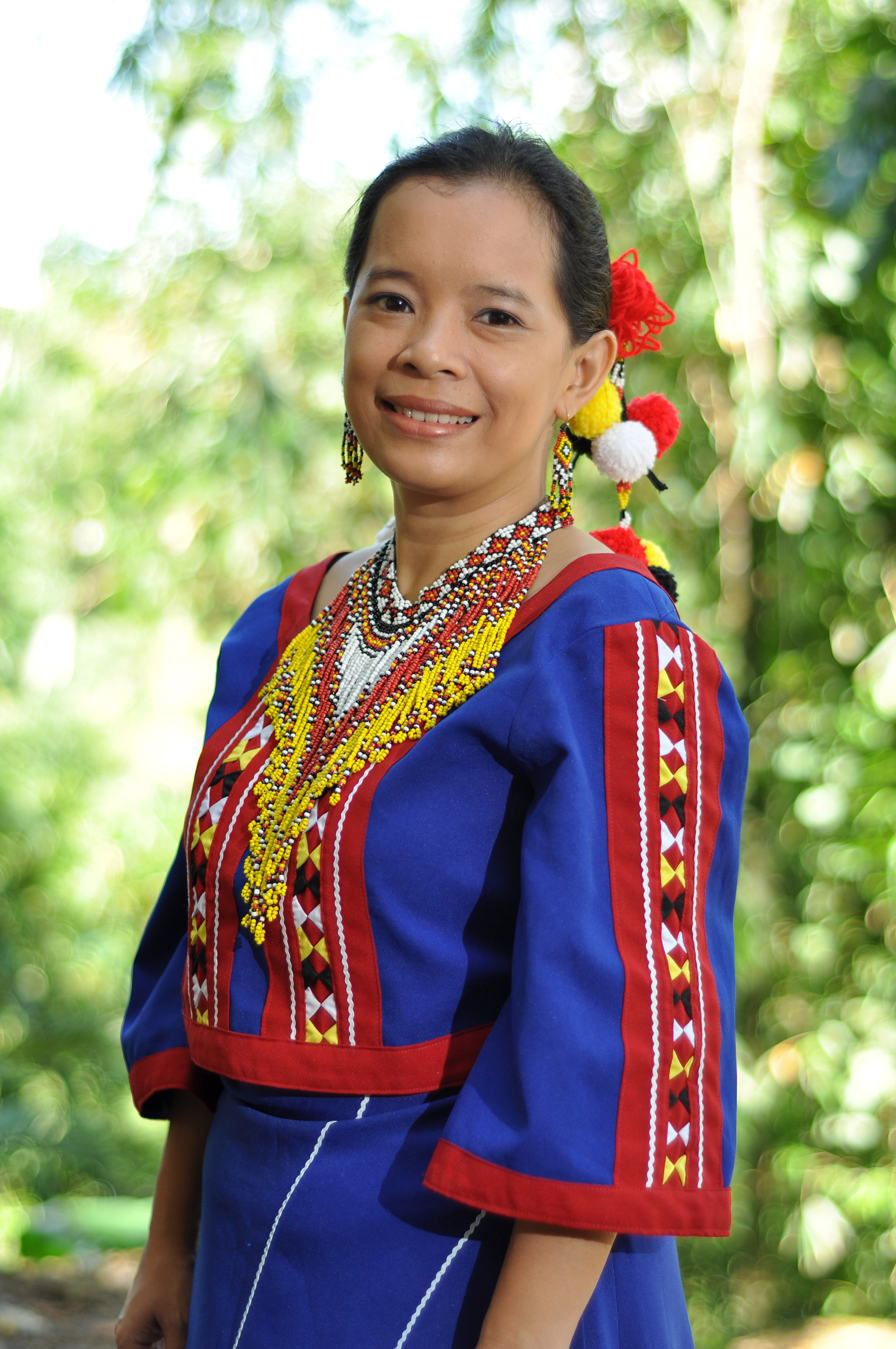
Mercibelle Barroso-Abejuela

Mercibelle Barroso-Abejuela earned her bachelor's degree in Music at the University of Santo Tomas in Manila. She was a full scholar of the late jeweler Fe S. Panlilio and her son Gabriel S. Panlilio. She majored in Voice Performance under Ms. Rachelle Gerodias, Professor Gloria D. Coronel, and the late Maestra Salvacion Oppus-Yniguez. She had been under the chorus classes of Professor Dick Mazo and Professor Fidel Calalang Jr. She has performed at the Cultural Center of the Philippines with the University of Santo Tomas Conservatory of Music Chorus. Also at the CCP, she has performed as Neneng in the Opera Abal Santo Niňo by Fr. Manuel Maramba. In 1999, she pursued her dream to serve the people in her province as a music director. She joined the Bukidnon State University as a music teacher, and in 2001 was appointed as the choral director of the University. She has attended choral conducting workshops with Jonathan Velasco, Eudenice Palaruan, Mark Carpio, Anna Tabitha Piquero, to name a few. Being a native of Bukidnon, she has envisioned the Bukidnon State University Chorale to become the premiere cultural group of the Bukidnon State University specializing in Bukidnon Indigenous Music. This earned her one of the credits to be accorded the rank of Bae, her tribal name being Kahukdungan Bae Manlilimbay, which means "an educator and a singer".
