= Budoy Marabiles =

Filipino actor and musician (1971–2025)

- Also known as: Budoy
- Born: Errol Marabiles; October 22, 1971; Samar, Philippines
- Died: December 4, 2025 (aged 54)
- Genres: Reggae, Dub, Spoken Poetry
- Occupations: Musician, songwriter, television host
- Years active: 2004–2025
- Formerly of: Junior Kilat

Errol "Budoy" Marabiles (October 22, 1971 – December 4, 2025) was a Filipino reggae musician, songwriter and television host. He was one of the fourteen housemates in the ABS-CBN show Pinoy Big Brother: Celebrity Edition.

Marabiles, easily recognizable among the housemates because of his dreadlocks or turban, attended the University of the Philippines Cebu.

Billed by the show as the "M16 of Samar", he is best known as the vocalist of the Cebu-based reggae band Junior Kilat, which is responsible for songs such as Original Sigbin (In Bisaya mythology, Sigbin is a mythical creature), K Fyne (Okay, Fine) and Ako si M16 (I am M16), which secured the Best Song in the 2005 NU Rock awards sponsored by the Manila-based rock radio station NU 107. That song bested most rock compositions of Manila-based bands though its lyrics are in Cebuano.

Together with one of his bandmates, Marabiles also co-produced and hosted the magazine show Ismol Tym (Small Time) on the independent Cebu-based cable channel RCTV prior to entering PBB.

Marabiles was evicted from the PBB house on Day 49 after losing to fellow nominees Zanjoe Marudo and Bianca Gonzalez through the people's vote. During his stay in the house, he composed (and performed) some songs that are in the Pinoy Big Brother Celebrity Edition soundtrack: Budoy Ako, a Visayan adaptation of Pinoy Ako, and Maligo Na Jam, based on his "Maligo na" (Take a bath already) rap, together with fellow housemates Rico Robles and Roxanne Barcelo.

After being evicted from the House, there was a published report that he told reporters the correct spelling of his last name is "Mirabiles", not "Marabiles" as earlier listed in the official show website and related collateral.

Marabiles died on December 4, 2025, at the age of 54.

== Filmography ==
=== Television ===
- Pinoy Big Brother: Celebrity Edition (2006)
- Amor Chico (2006)
- Milyonaryong Mini (2006–2007)

== See also ==
- Junior Kilat
