= Chorus Philippines =

Philippine composite choir

- Also known as: ChorPhils
- Origin: Manila, Philippines
- Genres: Choral music
- Years active: 2002–present
- Members: Joy Nilo (choirmaster)

Chorus Philippines is a composite choir founded by choirmaster-composer Joy Nilo in 2002. Cited as one of the country's leading chamber choirs, the choir has performed work by major composers as well as compositions by Filipino icons found in most concert halls in the Philippines.

== Performances ==
- Andreas Romberg's Das Lied von der Glocke, with the Philippine Philharmonic Orchestra held at the Cultural Center of the Philippines, November 2002.
- John Rutter's Gloria and Magnificat, with the Philippine Philharmonic Orchestra held at Sanctuario de San Agustin, December 2002.
- Beethoven's Symphony No. 9, with the Philippine Philharmonic Orchestra held at Sanctuario de San Agustin, March 2003.
- Mahler's Symphony No. 3, with the Philippine Philharmonic Orchestra held at the Cultural Center of the Philippines, April, 2003.
- Rachmaninov's Song of the Bells, with the Philippine Philharmonic Orchestra held at the Cultural Center of the Philippines, September, 2003.
- Carl Orff's Carmina Burana, with the Philippine Philharmonic Orchestra and Philippine Ballet Theater held at the Meralco Theater, September, 2003.
- Christmas At The Pen with the Philippine Philharmonic Orchestra, was a Christmas Concert held at Manila Peninsula Hotel, December, 2003.
- Mahler's Symphony of a Thousand, with the Philippine Philharmonic Orchestra held at the Cultural Center of the Philippines, April 2004.
- Christmas Choral Music at the Legenda Hotel, Subic. December 2005.
- Philippine Portraits is a concert that celebrated Philippine Independence Day and featured Filipino Patriotic and Folk songs as arranged by Mr. Joy Nilo. This concert, held at Paco Park in June 2006, was cited as one of 2006 biggest hits in the classical music genre by The Philippine Daily Inquirer's Midyear ‘Report Card’ on the Performing Arts.
- Around The World in 60 Minutes featured songs from all over the world as arranged by Mr. Joy Nilo. Paco Park, September 7, 2007.

== Discography ==
- MCNAP Hymn: the official theme song of The Maternal and Child Nursing Association of the Philippines. 2005
- A Century of Nursing Through God's Faithfulness: the Grand Prize Winner of the Mary Johnston College of Nursing Centennial Hymn Competition. 2006
- We Are Amway: the Official Theme Song of Amway Philippines. 2006
- Mary Johnston College of Nursing Hymn: recorded for the Centennial Celebration of Mary Johnston College of Nursing. February 2007
- Filipino Methodist Hymnal – Volume 1: produced by the National Innovative Ministries Partnership Program Media Center. January 2008
- A Midwife's Prayer: produced by Rene Nieva. October 2008
- Samnayanang Sumasamba: produced by Central United Methodist Church. March 2009
