= Mapúa Cardinal Singers =

Philippine choir

- Also known as: MUCS, MCS, Mapúa Singing Ambassadors, Mapúa Concert Singers
- Origin: Manila, Philippines
- Genre: Choral music
- Years active: 2000–present
- Website: www.mapuacardinalsingers.weebly.com

The Mapúa Cardinal Singers, formerly known as Mapúa Concert Singers, is the official resident choir of the Mapúa University in Intramuros, Metro Manila. The group is composed of male and female members who are passionately dedicated to the choral art. MCS is currently under the tutelage of Prof. Noel P. Azcona, a former Assistant Music Director and member of the award-winning choral group UST Singers.

== Discography ==
In 2004, they joined Harmonies, a choral festival which was sponsored by University of Santo Tomas. In 2005, they joined the National Music Competitions for Young Artists, (College Choir Category), The Metro Chorale in 2006, sponsored by De La Salle University Chorale and Colors of Worship in 2006 and 2008, organized by the Manila Chamber Singers.

== Awards ==
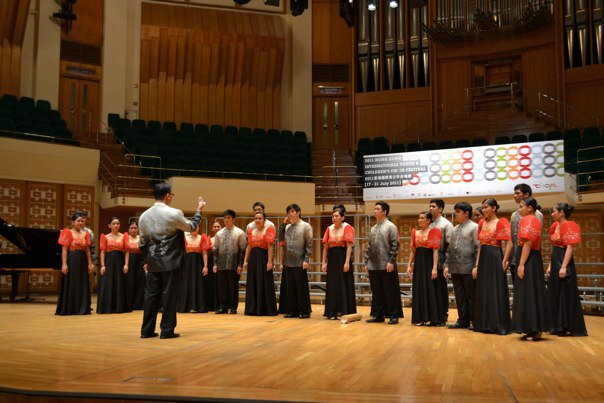
Mapúa Cardinal Singers during the 2011 Hong Kong International Youth and Children's Choir Festival

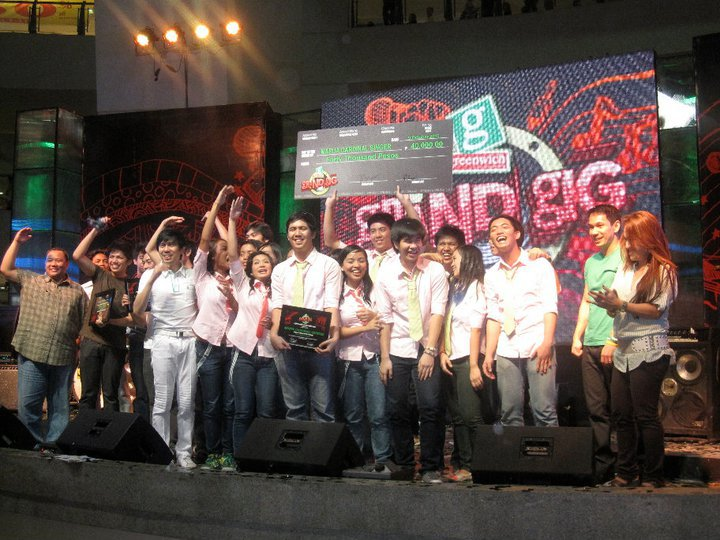
Mapúa Cardinal Singers announced as 2010 Greenwich Grand Gig Champions

Date/Year	Location of competition	Competition	Awards received
2006	(China) Xiamen	4th World Choir Games	Gold Diploma - Folklore Acapella Category; Gold Diploma - Mixed Chamber Choir Category; Silver Olympic Medal - Folklore Acapella Category; Silver Olympic Medal - Mixed Chamber Choir Category
2007	(Thailand) Pattaya	A Voyage of Songs 2007	Gold Prize Award - Folklore Category; Gold Prize Award - Mixed Chamber Choir Category
2008	(Philippines) Manila	3rd Manila Cathedral-Basilica Pipe Organ Festival Choral Competition	First Prize
2009	(Philippines) Manila	2009 MBC Paskong Pinoy National Choral Competition	Finalist
2010	(Philippines) Manila	Greenwich Grand Gig 2010	Grand Champion
2010	(Philippines) Manila	2010 MBC Paskong Pinoy National Choral Competition	Semi-Finalist
2011	Hong Kong	2011 Hong Kong International Youth and Children's Choir Festival	Gold Diploma - Overall Performance; Gold Award - Folklore Category; Silver Award - Youth Category
2012	(Philippines) Manila	Villancico "Pasko sa Intramuros" Competition	Champion
2012	(Vietnam) Huế	2nd Vietnam International Choir Competition	Gold Award - Youth Choir Category; Silver Award - Folklore Category
2013	(Philippines) Manila	Sing N' Joy 2013 Manila: Philippine International Choral Competition	Gold Award - Spiritual Category; Gold Award - Folklore Category; Silver Award - Mixed Youth Category; Silver Award - Sacred Category
2014	Singapore	Orientale Concentus VII	Gold Award - Folklore Category; Gold Award - Chamber Category; Gold Award - Mixed Youth Category; Category Winner - Mixed Youth Category
2015	(Vietnam) Hoi An	4th Vietnam International Choir Competition	Gold Award - Open Mixed Voices G3 Category; Gold Award - Sacred Category; Gold Award - Folklore Category
2016	Hong Kong	2016 Asia Cantate	Gold Diploma / Category Winner - Chamber Choir Category; Gold Diploma / Category Winner - Open Mixed Voices Choir Category; Gold Diploma - Folklore Category; Voices of Asia - Special Award; Jury Prize Award - Special Award; Grand Prix Finalist - Special Award
2017	(South Korea) Busan	13th Busan Choral Festival & Competition	Silver Prize Award - Classical Mixed Category; 1st Prize Award - Composition Competition for "Domine Deus Meus"
2018	(Indonesia) Bali	7th Bali International Choral Festival 2018	Gold Award - Mixed Youth Choir Category; Gold Award - Musica Sacra Category; Gold Award - Mixed Youth Choir Championship; Gold Award - Musica Sacra Championship; Category Winner - Mixed Youth Choir Category; Category Winner - Musica Sacra Category; Category Champion; Mixed Youth Choir Championship; Grand Prix Finalist
2021	(South Korea) Busan	Busan Choral Festival & Competition (Virtual Edition)	Silver Prize Award - Acapella Category
2023	Singapore	13th International Choral Festival Orientale Concentus	Gold Award - Category S (Sacred Choir); Gold Award - Category A2 (Mixed Voices - Open); Grand Prix Finalist
2024	(Philippines) Marikina	1st Gerard Dela Peña Choral Festival & Competition	Gold Award - Folk Category; Gold Award - Musica Sacra Category; Folk Category Winner; Best Interpretation - Musica Sacra Category; Grand Prix Winner
2025	(Philippines) Tarlac	3rd Sing, Tarlac, Sing Choral Festival & Competition	Category Winner & Gold Award - Folk Song Category; 3rd Place & Gold Award - Musica Sacra Category; 3rd Place & Gold Award - Mixed Choir Category; Grand Prix Qualifier
2025	(Thailand) Bangkok	2nd Thailand International Choral Festival	Gold Award - Folk Song Category; Gold Award - Mixed Youth Category; Grand Prix Finalist
