= Yunita Ababiel =

- Born: Frida Kartika Sriwahyuni; January 15, 1964; Bandung, West Java, Indonesia
- Died: July 13, 2025 (aged 61); Depok, West Java, Indonesia
- Other names: Jujun N. (1979–1990); Yuyun Nabiela; Yunita Irani
- Occupation: Singer
- Spouse: Alik Ababiel (m. 1981)
- Musical career
- Genres: Pop, dangdut, qasidah
- Instrument: Vocals
- Years active: 1979–2025
- Labels: Musica Studios (1979–1990); MSC Records (1991); New Metro/Blackboard (1997–1999); AGIP (2001); MGM Records (2002)

Yuyun Nabiela (January 15, 1964–July 13, 2025), also known as Jujun Nabiela or Yunita Ababiel, was an Indonesian dangdut singer. She became known for her 1999 song "Trauma."

== Career ==
Yunita began her professional music career in the late 1970s under the stage name Jujun N as a pop singer. Between 1979 and 1990, she released 12 pop albums and was also known as Yuyun Nabiela during this period. After shifting to the dangdut genre, she performed under the names Sriwahyuni and Yunita Irani.

In 1997, she adopted the name Yunita Ababiel for the album Pertengkaran, with “Ababiel” taken from her husband's name. Her most commercially successful release was the 1999 album Trauma, which became a national hit.

== Personal life and death ==
Yunita, the fourth of nine children, got engaged to Alik Ababiel, songwriter and leader of the 1970s rock band "Mountain Boys" (1974–1983), on June 29, 1979. The couple had six children together.

Yunita died at her home in Depok, West Java, on July 13, 2025, at the age of 61, from breast cancer and a brain stem tumor.

== Discography ==
=== Studio albums ===
==== Pop ====
- Vol. 1 (as Jujun N., 1979)
- Vol. 2 (as Jujun N., 1980)
- Vol. 3 (as Jujun N., 1981)
- Vol. 4 (as Jujun N., 1982)
- Vol. 5: Kau Yang Pertama (as Jujun N., 1983)
- Vol. 6 (as Jujun N., 1984)
- Vol. 7 (as Jujun N., 1985)
- Vol. 8 (as Jujun N., 1986)
- Vol. 9 (as Jujun N., 1987)
- Vol. 10 (as Jujun N., 1988)
- Vol. 11 (as Jujun N., 1989)
- Vol. 12 (as Jujun N., 1990)

==== Dangdut ====
- Forgive Me, Darling (as Sriwahyuni, 1979)
- Ujang Eneng (as Yunita Irani, 1991)
- Patience (as Yunita Irani, 1997)
- Quarrel (1997)
- Trauma (1999)
- A Woman's Feelings/Confession (2001)
- Shaken (2002)

=== Joint compilation album ===
- 10 Best Songs of LCLD-IV Surabaya 1994 (1994, song "Patung Batu" under the stage name Yuyun Nabiela)

=== Singles ===
- "Gundah" (2018)
- "Maha Cinta" (2018)
- "Shalawat Allahul Kahfi" (2021)

== Awards ==
- Nomination - Best Dangdut Female Solo Artist Indonesian Music Awards 2015
