= Thế Hiển =

Vietnamese singer-songwriter (1955–2025)

Lại Thế Hiển (December 8, 1955 – October 1, 2025), better known by his stage name Thế Hiển, was a Vietnamese musician.

== Life and career ==
Hiển was born in Saigon on December 8, 1955. He began composing music in 1982 with his first work "When the bubbles flew", before becoming better known, through two consecutive songs about soldiers titled Sing about you (1983) and Forest orchid branch (1986) . In the following years, he continued to release songs in a variety of genres including Nhong nhong nhong, Purple sunset, My hair is a chicken tail, Question mark, Waiting in the rain, Beyond yourself.

Once a member of the Ho Chi Minh City Music Association, he was dubbed by the domestic media as "a musical diarist". He was awarded the title of Outstanding Artist in 2012 and People's Artist in 2023 by the State of Vietnam, and was awarded the Third-class Labor Medal in 2016. He was outspoken in support of stopping the spread of COVID-19 during the outbreak in Vietnam.

Thế Hiển died from lung cancer on October 1, 2025, at the age of 69.
