= University of the Philippines Manila Chorale =

The University of the Philippines Manila Chorale

Background information
- Also known as: UP Manila Chorale, UPMC
- Origin: Manila, Philippines
- Genres: Choral music
- Years active: 1992–present
- Website: UPMC's Official Website

The UP Manila Chorale is the multi-awarded official performing group for choral music of the University of the Philippines Manila. Established in July 1992 by a few BA Behavioral Sciences students, the group aims to embody and represent the university locally and internationally through the art of choral music, serving as ambassadors of cultural goodwill by being the “voice of UP Manila to the world”. Presently, the group is led by their musical director, Emmanuel "Eman" P. de Leon Jr.

Over the years, the group has performed a wide repertoire: sacred, secular, spiritual, folk, jazz, pop, and Filipino music. The UPMC has been able to mold its members coming from non-musical disciplines into well-rounded and versatile singers. In recent years, the UPMC has performed compositions by Franz Biebl, Morten Lauridsen, Moses Hogan, Z. Randall Stroope, C. V. Stanford, Edward Elgar, Karol Szymanowski, and many more. As an advocate of Filipino choral music, the UPMC has in their repertoire the music of Eudenice "Eudy" Palaruan, Nilo Alcala, John August Pamintuan, and Josefino "Chino" Toledo.

The UPMC has an established record of successful concerts and projects; these include major concerts, benefit concerts, local and international choral competitions, local and international choral festivals, nine international concert tours, and performances for heads of state and dignitaries. The group is regularly invited to choral competitions, and it has garnered several awards locally and internationally. As of August 2016, the UP Manila Chorale ranks number 44 in the Musica Mundi/ INTERKULTUR World Ranking List - Top 50 Mixed Choirs and number 31 in the Musica Mundi/ INTERKULTUR World Ranking List - Top 50 Pop/ Jazz/ Gospel/ Spiritual/ Barbershop Choirs. Meanwhile, the group ranks number 202 in the Musica Mundi/ INTERKULTUR World Ranking List – Top 1000 Choirs.

In June 2015, the UPMC travelled and performed in nine European countries and was awarded in two of the most prestigious and longest running choral competitions in Spain. The group was declared 3rd prize winner in the mixed category and second prize winner in the folk category in the 33° Festival Internacional de Musica de Cantonigros in Vic, Spain, and 1st prize winner in the polyphony category of the 61st International Habaneras and Polyphony Contest of Torrevieja, Spain. This year, the UPMC partnered with Habitat for Humanity Philippines as their beneficiary in their goal of rebuilding homes affected by the 2013 Bohol earthquake.

In February 2016, the group was awarded the Ani ng Dangal (Harvest of Honors) given by the National Commission for Culture and the Arts in recognition of their achievements from the aforementioned choral competitions during their 8th European Tour.

== Conductor ==
Eman earned his Diploma for Creative and Performing Musical Arts (DCPMA) and Bachelor of Music (BM) degree, major in Music Education, from the University of the Philippines College of Music. As a musician, he has established himself as a chorister, conductor, arranger, and teacher, lending his talents by playing these roles to different choirs, organizations, and events. He has composed and arranged pieces for various choral competitions, orchestral performances, television, and stage productions.

Prior to UPMC, Eman served as the former Assistant Conductor of the University of the Philippines Concert Chorus from 2007 to 2012. In 2012, he conducted and led the group in winning several international recognitions in different competitions in Europe.

Currently, Eman holds a master's degree in music (MM), major in Choral Conducting, also hailing from the UP College of Music. He is a faculty of the Conducting Department in the UP College of Music Extension Program. He also sings Bass-Baritone with the Philippine Madrigal Singers.

== Awards and competitions ==
Year	Award	Competition
1995	Second Place	Instituto Cervantes' Cantar Villancicos en Intramuros Choral Competition
1996	Second Place	Instituto Cervantes' Cantar Villancicos en Intramuros Choral Competition
1997	First Place	Instituto Cervantes' Cantar Villancicos en Intramuros Choral Competition
1998 (1st European Tour)	Third Place, Folk Category	3rd International Choir Competition Bad Ischl (Salzkammergut, Austria)
1999	Most Outstanding Student Organization	UP Manila Gawad Chancellor Award
2003	Second Place	Himig ng Puso Choral Competition
2005 (3rd European Tour)	Third Place, Gold Diploma, Mixed Youth Choir Second Place, Gold Diploma, Folksong Category Forderpreis Stadt Bad Ischl	7th International Choir Competition Bad Ischl (Salzkammergut, Austria)
2007 (4th European Tour)	Gold III Diploma and Category Winner, Mixed Youth Choir Category Special Award: Extraordinary Artistic Engagement	1st International Anton Bruckner Choir Competition and Festival (Linz, Austria)
2009 (5th European Tour)	Silver Diploma, Mixed Youth Choir Category Silver Diploma, Folk Category	9th International Choir Competition Bad Ischl (Salzkammergut, Austria)
2009 (5th European Tour)	Gold II Diploma and Category Winner, Mixed Youth Choir Category	2nd International Anton Bruckner Choir Competition and Festival (Linz, Austria)
2011 (6th European Tour)	Gold V Diploma and Category Winner, Mixed Youth Choir	3rd International Anton Bruckner Choir Competition and Festival (Linz, Austria)
2013 (7th European Tour)	Achievement Level II - very good international level	13th International Chamber Choir Competition (Marktoberdorf, Germany)
2013	Gold Diploma V, Category Winner, Spiritual Category Gold Diploma IV, Category Winner, Sacred Category Gold Diploma III, Category Winner, Mixed Category Special Award: Outstanding Tenor Soloist, Greggy Quiocho	Sing N' Joy Manila
2014	Most Outstanding Student Organization	UP Manila Gawad Chancellor Award
2015 (8th European Tour)	3rd Prize ex aequo, Mixed Choir Category 2nd Prize, Folk Category	33rd Cantonigros International Music Festival (Vic, Spain)
2015 (8th European Tour)	1st Prize, Polyphony Category	61st International Habaneras and Polyphony Contest of Torrevieja
2016	Recipient, Ani ng Dangal Award for Music	National Commission for Culture and the Arts (NCCA) 8th Ani ng Dangal Awards
