= Tropical Depression (band) =

Filipino reggae band

- Origin: Philippines
- Genres: Reggae, reggaeton
- Years active: 1987–present
- Members: Bonglennon Eudela; Pex Holigores; TJ Espinola; Macky dela Cuesta; Cholo Famisan; Bunny Liwanag; Jaydee Abugan
- Past members: Dominic "Papadom" Gamboa; Lito Crisostomo; Mike Llacar; Lala Lejeune; Arlene Empalmado; Anabel Bosch; Brutus Lacano; Ryan Locsin; Jun Lazo; Omnie Saroca; Pio Valdez; Jacob Sawyer; JR Oca; Burn Belacho; Boogs Villareal; Jerros Dolino; Jo Staples

Tropical Depression is a Filipino reggae band formed in 1987 by vocalist and guitarist Dominic "Papadom" Gamboa (1965–2013) and guitarist Lawrence "Bonglennon" Eudela. The band went into the mainstream in 1990. Aside from Gamboa and Eudela, the band's notable line-up was composed of guitarist Lito Crisostomo, bassist Pex Holigores, keyboardists TJ Espinola and Mike Llacar, back-up vocalists Arlene Empalmado and Lala Lejeune, and drummer Brutus Lacano.

The band was one of the several bands who spearheaded the 1990s Pinoy rock explosion and popularized the songs "Kapayapaan", "Bilog Na Naman ang Buwan" and "Alaala".

== Hiatus ==
The group went into hiatus in 2013 following the death of original lead vocalist Dominic Gamboa. Gamboa died a day before his 48th birthday in December 2013. The wake of his burial was held private as per his family's request. The cause of death was said to be due to kidney failure. On February 12, 2016, Gamboa's widow Maria Amparo Concepcion "Teng" Santaromana-Gamboa, 50, was found dead with a gunshot wound in the head along Kalayaan Avenue, Makati. Santaromana-Gamboa, who worked in a business process outsourcing company in Makati, was believed to be killed minutes after she left her office at 2:20 AM on February 10. She was declared missing the following day. Police said that prior to her death, Santaromana-Gamboa was able to send a text message to her son informing him that she was on her way home aboard a taxicab. The primary suspect Nitro "Zenki" Agustin Ison a.k.a. Ricky Ibatuan Ramos, a taxi driver, was arrested in April 2016. The motive of the killing was later identified to be a robbery. Ison was also charged with other criminal cases in connection with at least seven cases of car thefts, seven cases of robberies using stolen taxicabs, three homicide cases and at least three rape cases in Quezon City, Mandaluyong and other areas in southern Metro Manila.

== Reunion ==
The group reunited in 2015 with a new line-up composed of original members Bonglennon Eudela (guitar), TJ Espinola (keyboards), Pex Holigores (bass), and Brutus Lacano (drums), together with new frontmen JR Oca (vocals) and Burn Belacho (vocals, guitars & hegalong).

2024–present lineup

- Bonglennon Eudela – guitars, vocals, arrangement
- Pex Holigores – bass, vocals
- TJ Espinola – keyboards
- Jaydee Abugan – drums
- Macky dela Cuesta – keyboards
- Cholo Miguel Famisan – vocals
- Bunny Liwanag – vocals

== Discography ==
=== Studio albums ===
Title	Date of release (Philippines)	Record label
Kapayapaan	1994	Viva Records
Aabot Din Tayo	2002	NEO Records

=== Compilation album ===
- Alert Level - The Album - released in 1993
