= University of the Philippines Singing Ambassadors =

Singing group at the University of the Philippines Diliman, Quezon City

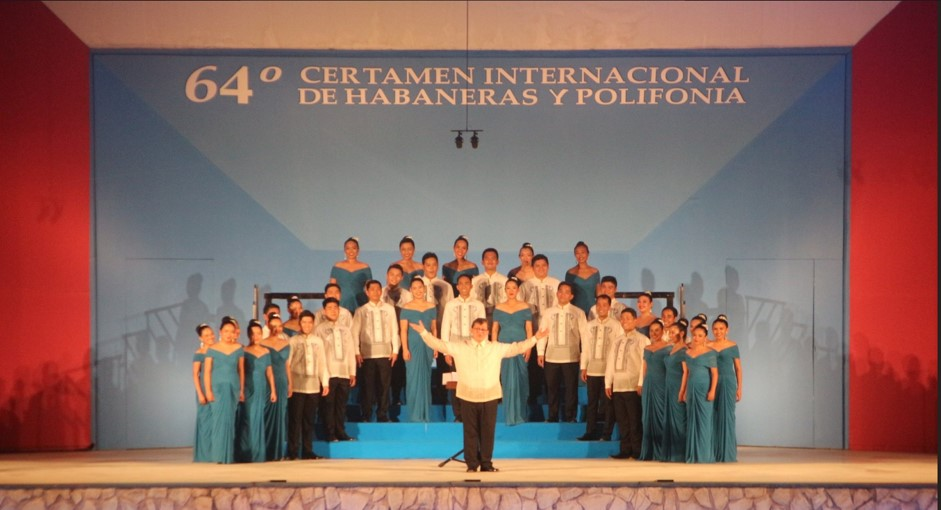

Background information
- Also known as: UP Singing Ambassadors, UPSA
- Origin: Quezon City, Philippines
- Genres: Choral music
- Years active: 1980–present
- Members: Edgardo L. Manguiat (musical director and conductor, 1980–present)
- Website: Official website

The University of the Philippines Singing Ambassadors, also known as the UP Singing Ambassadors or UPSA, is one of the major performing musical groups based at the University of the Philippines Diliman (UP-Diliman) in Quezon City, Philippines. UPSA is the State University's official performing group for choreographed choral music and resident choir of the UP College of Arts and Letters. The UPSA has performed music from different styles: classical music, international songs, spirituals, ethnic, Broadway, pop, jazz, gospel, inspirational songs and rock. As ambassadors of Philippine culture, the UPSA incorporates cultural dances, costumes and traditions from various regions in the Philippines as part of its repertoire.

The UPSA has won numerous accolades and citations, locally and internationally, including a slot at the 2002 and 2019 European Choral Grand Prix.

== Awards ==
Like two other UP-based choirs (namely, the Philippine Madrigal Singers (the Madz) and the UP Concert Chorus (UPCC)), the UPSA has gained national prominence through its participation in international choral competitions.

Winning the Gran Premio Città at the Concorso Polifonico Internazionale Guido d'Arezzo in Italy in 2001 and 2018 (thus far the only Asian choir winning the award twice), the UPSA was eligible to compete as one of the finalists in the 14th European Grand Prix of Choral Singing in 2002 and the 31st edition of the elite competition in 2019. Together with the Madz, the UST Singers and the Ateneo Glee Club, the UPSA is one of the first four Filipino choirs who were eligible to compete in the European Choral Grand Prix.

The UPSA also has the distinction of being the only choir that has won three awards in the 51-year history of the International Habaneras and Polyphony Contest in Torrevieja, Spain. This competition was also participated in by the Philippine Madridal Singers a year before UPSA joined the competition.
