= Hamdan ATT =

- Born: Hamdan Attamimi; January 17, 1946; Batavia, Dutch East Indies
- Died: July 1, 2025 (aged 79); Jakarta, Indonesia
- Musical career
- Genres: Dangdut
- Years active: 1964–2025

Hamdan Attamimi (January 17, 1946 – July 1, 2025), known as Hamdan ATT, was an Indonesian dangdut singer. He became widely known after releasing a song entitled Termiskin Di Dunia in 1980.

Indonesian Dangdut Awards 2021 gave the Lifetime Achievement award to Hamdan ATT for his dedication to dangdut music in the country.

== Life and career ==
As a teenager, Hamdan ATT would imitate guitarist Hank Marvin from the English music group The Shadows. Even his group was given a name similar to the name of the group Hank Shadows, as if forming Quinta Bayangan from the English group in 1964. Although similar to the Hank Shadows music group, he often performed songs by The Shadows. In 1968, Hamdan ATT also played a role as a singer to join the band 'Nada Buana' which appeared on TVRI after his return from Ambon. Then Hamdan ATT focused on his studies in 1969 until graduating in 1975. After graduating from college, Hamdan ATT finally became a dangdut singer.

Hamdan ATT died at his residence Kramat Jati, East Jakarta, on July 1, 2025, at the age of 76. Previously, Hamdan ATT had experienced a number of health problems, including two strokes in 2017 and 2021. In October 2024, he underwent surgery to install a tube after experiencing a ruptured blood vessel in his brain. Although his condition improved after the operation, his health continued to decline until he finally died.

== Discography ==
- Cold
- Ex-Girlfriend
- Heartache (Chadut 2003)
- Broken steering wheel of Malay songs
- Gold becomes copper
- Don't love me
- Poorest in the world
- Drunk on gambling
- Memory on the train
- Wealth and love
- Life just barely

== Awards and nominations ==
Tahun	Penghargaan	Kategori	Hasil
2021	Indonesian Dangdut Awards	Lifetime Achievement Award	Penerima
