= Philippine Violators =

Filipino punk band founded in 1984

- Origin: Manila, Philippines
- Years active: 1984-present
- Labels: Twisted Red Cross (1980's); Rare Music Distributor (1987-Present); Akasha Records (1994); Tone Def (1995-1997)
- Members: Arnold Alar; Charlie Espiritu; Jay Fronda; Jesus Espiritu
- Past members: Boyet Padernal; Noel Banares; Ricky Tarriela; Seymour Estavillo

Philippine Violators is a Filipino punk rock band that was formed in 1984 by school kids Charlie and Jesus Espiritu at Arellano University in Legarda Street, Sampaloc, Manila, Philippines. They were joined by two classmates, Jay Frondo and Arnold Alar.

== Discography ==
=== Albums ===
Year	Title	Label
1987	At Large!	Twisted Red Cross
1991	State of Confusion	Rare Music Distributor
1994	Sikat Na si Pedro	Akasha Records
1994	The Third Offense	Rare Music Distributor
1997	Balanse	Tone Def
2015	Noon at Ngayon	Solo Gastos Production

=== Compilations ===
Year	Title	Label
2004	Volume 1: 1984–2004	Itchy Korean Records
2023	Rarites 2023	LBG Records
