= UNiCA =

Filipino pop and rock band

ÚNiCA
- Origin: Zamboanga City, Philippines
- Genres: Filipino rock (OPM); Alternative rock Pop rock
- Years active: 2009–2015
- Labels: Mad Media Works (2009–2010); Viva Records (2010–2015)
- Members: Demz Espinosa; Whey Guevara; Jimi Tristan Ong; R.B Bandiola; Mad Nubhan; Jesser Sison
- Past members: Francel Joy de Leon; Alyson Tracy Ybarlei
- Website: UNiCA Facebook Page

ÚNiCA (formerly Maldita) is a Filipino pop and rock band consisting of Demz Espinosa as the main vocalist and Whey Guevara as the guitarist and composer who formed in 2009. Their first single, "¿Por qué?" became a hit song, which was originally in Zamboangueño Chavacano then later had a national version in Filipino, with only the chorus remaining in Zamboangueño Chavacano.

== Members ==
=== Current ===
- Demz Espinosa (vocals)
- Whey Guevara (rhythm guitars, lyrics)
- Jimi Tristan Ong (bass)
- R.B Bandiola (lead guitars, rhythm guitars)
- Nico Sta. Cruz (drums)
- Jesser Sison (keyboards, synths)

=== Former ===
- Francel de Leon (vocals)
- Alyson Ybarlei (vocals)
- Mad Nubhan (drums)
- James Medina (bass)
- Michael Tordecillas (drums)
- Whey Guevara (guitars/lyrics)

== History ==
=== Formation (2009) ===
Whey Guevara's need for an outlet for his compositions made him look for an avenue to turn his written material into something that could entertain the public. He eventually paired up with Paulo Sungsai, and conceived of the now well-known band, Maldita, with its first vocalist Alyson Tracy Ybarlei. With the help of Zack Quijano of Comic Relief and Michael Tordecillas of Bad Grass, the band performed at Barangay Culianan, Zamboanga City with "sessionistas", and with Michael as Maldita's drummer. Through this exposure, the band was able to raise enough capital to produce their first single.

They eventually wound up at Mad Media Works Studio to put down their first recording, "Tú Lang", with Alyson Tracy doing her best to meet Whey's requirements for the melody, but to no avail. This led Whey to give the song to the band Comic Relief, where he was the bassist. Around this time, Whey, Michael and Zack proposed a project dubbed Comic Relief-Maldita Back to Back Album, in collaboration with Media Works Management. Whey started compiling compositions for this project. They started recording his first song "Tú Lang" (which eventually went to Comic Relief). While this was unfolding, he opted to proceed and record the acoustic single "Porque?", with Alyson Tracy doing the vocals. After a few weeks, a problem arose. Alyson Tracy had to leave, leaving Maldita without a vocalist and only "sessionistas" as its musicians.

Weeks went by, when Francel de Leon appeared at the studio to do some video editing for a school requirement. While at the back room of the studio, Francel sang a melody which immediately caught Whey's attention. He went to the back room to take a look at who was singing, surprised to find it was Francel, whom he knew well. Whey talked to Francel and offered her the position of vocalist, which she accepted. By this time, Whey had a better idea of what he wanted for his band. He needed another vocalist. With Francel having joined Maldita, Whey sought her opinion regarding who could take up the position. Without any hesitation, she mentioned 2009 Miss Teen Zamboanga Demz Espinosa, a friend and a great singer. With both Francel and Demz at the studio and fully committed to Maldita, they started to study the initial material. The decision was immediately made to record "¿Por qué?" since some band members were not yet finalized. With the assistance of RB Bandiola, the song "¿Por qué?" became reality. Whey, Francel and Demz started recording "¿Por qué?". During one of the break hours, Whey was chatting with James, an old friend. James told Whey that he wanted to be the bassist for the band, which Whey accepted without hesitation. A few days later, inside the studio, Whey with RB started to brainstorm about an arrangement for a song. Later, both RB and Whey agreed that RB would be Maldita's lead guitarist. With Whey as the rhythm guitarist, Maldita's composition as a band was considered complete. Recording sessions went on as scheduled. By coincidence, Jesser Sison, an old acquaintance of Whey, dropped by to drop off his keyboard. Whey, aware of Jesser's ability as a musician, thought of a part for Jesser in the song being recorded at that moment. With some discussions and rearrangement of some portions of the song, Jesser laid down some keyboard parts for the song and became the keyboard player and final member of Maldita.

Things developed quickly within and outside the band. Whey decided to release the first single "¿Por qué?" through several FM radio stations initially in Zamboanga City. Michael Tordecillas, Maldita's drummer, was offered a job. At the band's pre-album launch mini in Tugbungan, Maldita transitioned from Michael Tordecillas to Mad Nubhan on drums during a cover of "My Heart" by Paramore.

=== Manila (2010–2011) ===
After uploading "¿Por qué?" to YouTube, the unexpected happened. A local radio put the track on rotation. A Manila-based Zamboangueña, composer Geraldine Therese Lim, was among those who heard it on the radio. Lim was in the city, scouting for local talent. Lim couldn't get the song out of her head, and immediately translated it into Tagalog. Lim said she later browsed the Internet and found Francel and Demz singing it. She immediately contacted them. It was Lim, through the help of her close friend Pia Santiago, who opened the door for the band to get a contract. But even before they could start recording, bad news came. Francel had to leave because she was a candidate for cum laude. Thus Maldita's final line-up is Whey, Dems, drummer Mohammad Reda Nubhan, bassist Jimi Tristan Ong and lead guitarist Renever Bandiola.

=== Maldita (2011) ===
In 2011, the band signed a record distribution deal and released their first full-length album, titled Maldita, under Viva Records. The album featured the hit-song "¿Por qué?", along with its Tagalog version "Bakit?".

=== As UNiCA (2012–2015) ===
According to their Twitter account Maldita will be renamed as ÚNiCA and will release their 2nd album after.

=== UNiCA Disband ===
According to their Facebook account UNiCA has disbanded the next day of their last performance on November 24, 2015.

== Discography ==
- Maldita (2011)
1. "Tuliro"
2. "Selosa"
3. "Gayuma"
4. "Sa'Yo"
5. "Yo Ya Lang Era"
6. "Bahala Na"
7. "Dehado"
8. "Sana"
9. "Bakit?"
10. "Ayoko Na Sa'Yo"
11. "Crossroads"
12. "¿Por qué? (Chavalog Version)"
