= Junior Kilat =

Filipino reggae, ska and dub band

- Origin: Cebu City, Philippines
- Genres: Pinoy reggae
- Years active: 2004–present
- Members: Tiano Evangelista (bass); Archie Ybañez (guitar); Bangin Atienza (turntable); Gina Pestaño (keyboards); Cleofas Quijano (trombone); Diana Freese (drums)
- Past members: Errol "Budoy" Marabiles (vocals); Jad Dapat

Junior Kilat is a Filipino reggae, ska and dub band based in Cebu City, Philippines. The name is taken from the 1970s Cebu band "Leon Kilat", which the latter group claims, was first to sing about "Agta".

The band is composed of Errol "Budoy" Marabiles on vocals, Tiano Evangelista on bass, Archie Ybañez on guitar, Bangin Atienza on turntable, Gina Pestaño on keyboards, Cleofas Quijano on trombone and Diana Freese on drums. Former guitarist Jad Dapat is now part of the Electronica/Dub group Kahibaloo and The Science Project, a Dubstep-Minimalist group, in Australia.

== Albums ==
The group's first release was on the 2004 album Island Riddims which featured two of their tracks: K-Fyne and Original Sigbin. Both were performed live at The Baseline in Cebu City. Their second appearance was in the Island Krismas album with their track Kling Klang.

Their first album, party pipol ur on dub tv, was released in 2005. Some of the tracks in this album were studio-recorded, others performed live at Idiot Board, also in Cebu City.

Their second album was entitled Buwad Suka Sili and contains five tracks, two music videos and The Making of Ako Si M16 video. The video of K-Fyne is also included in the album. The lineup of Junior Kilat changed for this album. Jad Dapat, formerly the group's guitarist, left the band and Archie Ybañez took over his duties.

Currently, they have a new album, Enrique De Malacca. The carrier single of the said album is "1-2-3".

== ABS-CBN collaboration ==
Junior Kilat currently features in a Cebu-based channel RCTV show, Ismol Tym, in which Diana Freese, Tiano Evangelista and Gina Pestaño are staff members. Errol "Budoy" Marabiles also joined Pinoy Big Brother Celebrity Edition, an ABS-CBN production. He has written two songs for the show, Maligo Na Jam, which began as a poem he wrote while inside the Pinoy Big Brother house, and Budoy Ako, the Cebuano version of Pinoy Ako.

== Discography and track listings with duration ==
- Island Riddims
  - K-Fyne
  - Original Sigbin
- Island Krismas
  - Kling Klang
- party pipol ur on dub tv
  - Sigbin dub (4:59)
  - Party pipol ur on TV live
  - Lansyaw Gimadkaw
  - A.k.a. Otap live
  - Agta dub (3:46)
  - Agta live
  - Kling klang dub
  - Suyop live (5:06)
  - K-Fyne live (4:17)
  - Kung di pa lang sala (4:50)
  - Suyop dub
  - Ako si M16 (4:37)
- Buwad Suka Sili
  - Buwad Suka Sili (5:13)
  - Lubot sa Yawa
  - Sigbin Rekonstruktion
  - Budoy Ako (4:02)
  - Buwad Suka Sili (Radio Edit)
- Enrique De Malacca
  - Lumay
  - Katyubong
  - 1-2-3 (4:23)
  - Lumay
  - Ungo Dub

== Awards ==
Year	Award giving body	Category	Nominated work	Results
2005	NU Rock Awards	Song of the Year	"Ako si M16"	Won
2005	NU Rock Awards	Best New Artist	—N/a	Nominated
2005	NU Rock Awards	Album of the Year	"Party PIpol Ur on Dub"	Nominated
