= Suitcase101 =

Filipino alternative rock band

- Origin: Tagbilaran City, Bohol, Philippines
- Genres: Alternative rock, Novelty, funk, rap rock, experimental, alternative metal
- Years active: 2004–present
- Label: Bohol Records
- Members: Adrian Bayron (vocals); Jairus Bayron (guitars); Felix Oliver Bacareza (guitars); Mike Miranda (drums); Venjo Busalla (bass)
- Past members: Alexis Balista, Rissa Cabalit, Sam Varquez, Chris Cornelio
- Website: The Official Site of Suitcase101

Suitcase101 is a Filipino Rock band that was formed in 2004 by a group of students. It is listed as one of the Philippines' top 100 groups, famous and most lauded for its original rock novelty songs, and often creates satirical covers of famous songs. The band has since transcended musical genres, varying styles from one song to another - alternative rock to pop rock, funk to rapcore, and so on - while providing comic relief to their listeners. They became popular after winning the Globe kantabataan singing tilt.

== Early life and career ==
The band was formed in 2004. The name Suitcase101 was derived from the band Matchbox20, whom at that time the band was quite popular at that time.. Formed in mid-2005, Suitcase101 started as an acoustic band in a local resto bar in Bohol who left the band for various reasons. Vocalist Adrian Bayron was in the band.

Its metamorphosis was closely watched by fans from being an acoustic band to an alternative rock band. Suitcase101 continued performing and composing songs the new members decided to take the "band thing" seriously. With Adrian on vocals, Alva Duaban on guitars, Arvin Avergonzado on drums and Venjo Busalla on bass. They slowly gained popularity with their first original composition 'Kalahati' as their regular audience would bring over a friend the next time they came. There was even a time that the song was played twice on the same night as latecomers would insist on requesting the song even though it had already been played earlier..

They recorded the song "Kalahati" and two other original tracks namely "Never Need Someone" and "Three Years Since" in Backyard Project Studios in Cebu City last March 2007. They burst into Bohol's music scene as they released "Kalahati" and "Never Need Some" on local radio stations 911 FM and 102.3 Kiss FM, winning 6 Battle of the Bands competitions and opened for Manila-based artists such as Bamboo, Imago, Moonstar88, Hale and Urbandub to name a few.

Suitcase101 created a wave when the band won the national search of the Globe Kantabataan 2007. It seems that there was no depth to the band's name, but during the course of the Globe Kantabataan competition, the band was frequently traveling back and forth Manila and Bohol. They discovered that traveling together with the band makes their bond a lot stronger and they just love traveling together. Hence, the name Suitcase101 just fit quite right for the band.

The band gained regional recognition in the Visayas after its songs "Kalahati" and "Posible ang Lahat", the winning entry in the 2007 Globe Kantabataan competition, received regular airplay on Cebu radio stations 91.5 Hot FM and 93.1 Smash FM. In 2007, the band won the Sandugo Battle of the Bands, with Adrian receiving the Best Vocalist award, Alva the Best Guitarist award, and Arvin the Best Drummer award for the third time. The band also won the 2007 Globe Kantabataan competition and became seven-time Battle of the Bands champions.

After achieving success with Globe Kantabataan, Alva left the band to pursue a nursing degree. Felix Oliver Bacareza, who had previously played with the band as a session guitarist, replaced him.

Suitcase101 performed at the Sanggunang Kabataan (SK) National Congress 2008 singing the SK theme song with Philippine Pres. Gloria Macapagal Arroyo as guest of honor.
On December 19, 2016, the band was featured on Julius Babao's Mission Possible for supporting a girl fighting against cancer. The full episode was aired right after ABS-CBN's news program Bandila.

== Award ==
- Grand champion, Globe Kantabataan

== Album ==
After three years, Suitcase101 has a self-titled debut album.

The album has 11 songs--- Riddle, Three Years Since, Kalahati, Never Need Someone (they hate girls!), 163, Starlight, Foreman, Handuraw, Boholano, Live Loud Kicking Out and Lakas ng Himig, the official theme song of the Sangguniang Kabataan--- with two bonus tracks, Kalahati acoustic version and Possible Ang Lahat.

== Band members ==
- Adrian Bayron (vocals)
- Jairus Bayron (rhythm guitar)
- Felix Oliver Bacareza (lead guitar)
- Venjo Busalla (bass)
- Mike Miranda (drums)

== Past members ==
- Arvin Avergonzado (drums)
- Alva Duaban (guitars)
- Chris Cornelio (guitars)
