= International Habaneras and Polyphony Contest of Torrevieja =

Annual choral music competition

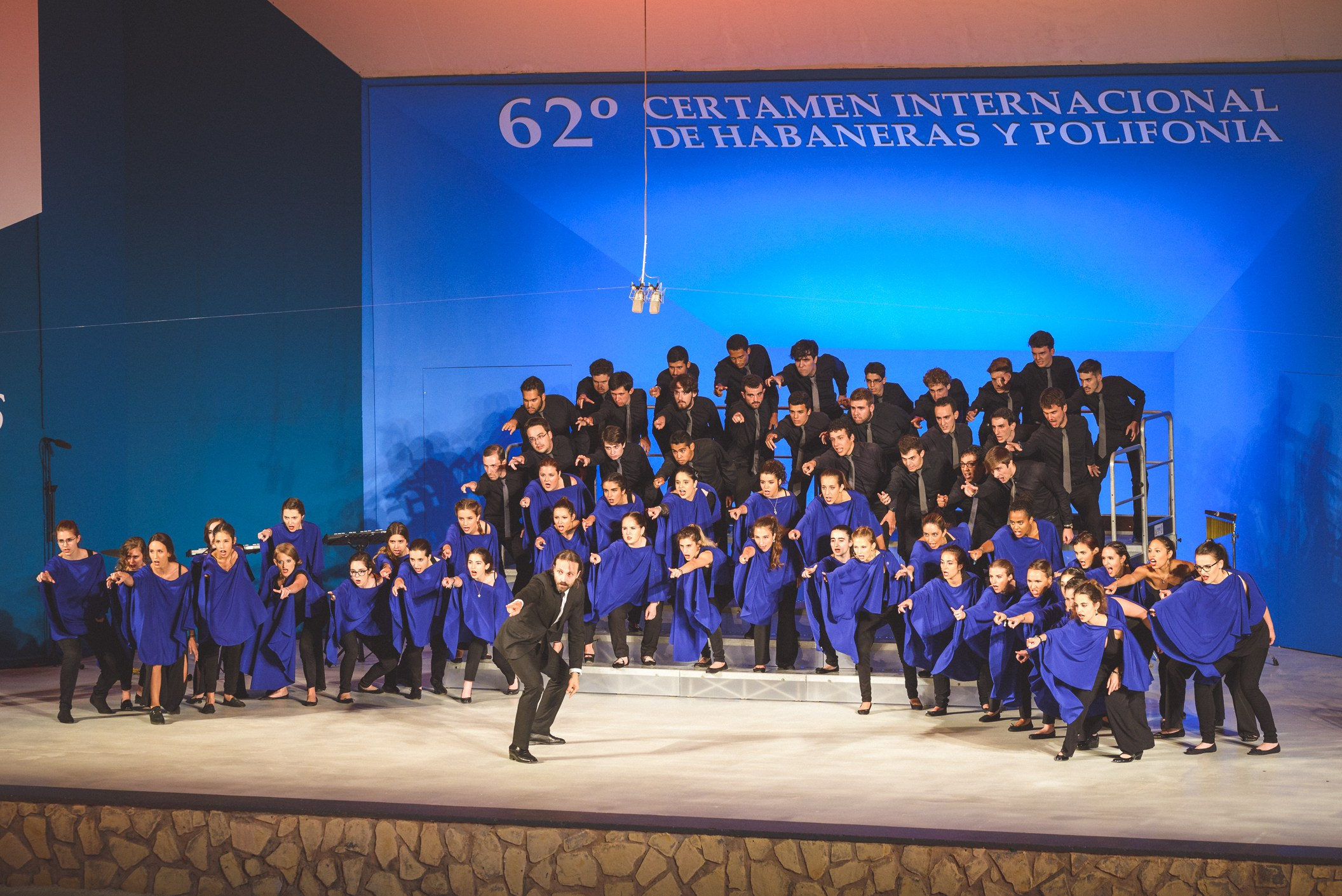
- Coro de Jóvenes de Madrid performing at the 62nd edition of the contest (2016)
- Genre: Choral festival
- Date: Late July
- Frequency: Annual
- Locations: Torrevieja (Alicante), Spain
- Inaugurated: 1955

Fiesta of International Tourist Interest
- Designated: 1994

The International Habaneras and Polyphony Contest of Torrevieja (Spanish: Certamen Internacional de Habaneras y Polifonía de Torrevieja, Valencian: Certamen Internacional d'Havaneres i Polifonia de Torrevieja) is an international choral music competition specialized in habaneras and polyphony that has been held since 1955 (Note: Except for 2020–2021 due to the COVID-19 pandemic.) in Torrevieja (Alicante), Spain. It holds the honorary distinction of Fiesta of International Tourist Interest since 1994.

For the 2023 edition Kammerchor Manila from Quezon City (Philippines) swept the first prizes in the habaneras and polyphony categories, as well as the overall score and best director prizes.

Since 1994, the International Junior Contest of Habaneras of Torrevieja (Spanish: Certamen Internacional Juvenil de Habaneras de Torrevieja) for children's and youth choirs has been held every April.
