= Leandro Locsin =

Filipino architect (1928–1994)

Leandro V. Locsin
- Born: August 15, 1928; Silay, Negros Occidental, Philippine Islands
- Died: November 15, 1994 (aged 66); Makati, Philippines
- Resting place: Yulo Family Mausoleum, Canlubang, Calamba City, Laguna
- Education: University of Santo Tomas (BS)
- Occupation: Architect
- Awards: Order of National Artists of the Philippines; Fukuoka Prize
- Practice: www.locsinarchitecture.com
- Buildings: Church of the Holy Sacrifice, Cultural Center of the Philippines, Philippine International Convention Center, Istana Nurul Iman, Immaculate Heart of Mary Parish and The Philippine Plaza

Leandro Valencia Locsin, Sr. (August 15, 1928 – November 15, 1994), also known by the initials LVL and the nickname "Lindy", was a Filipino architect, artist, and interior designer known for his use of concrete, floating volume and simplistic design in his various projects. An avid collector, he was fond of modern painting and Chinese ceramics. He was proclaimed a National Artist of the Philippines for Architecture in 1990 by the late President Corazon Aquino.

He received the Arts and Culture Prize of the Fukuoka Prize in 1992.

== Life and career ==
Locsin was born on August 15, 1928, in Silay, Negros Occidental, a grandson of the first governor of the province. He completed his elementary education at De La Salle College in Manila before returning to Negros due to the Second World War. Locsin then returned to Manila to finish his secondary education in La Salle and studied Pre-Law before shifting to pursue a Bachelor's Degree in Music at the University of Santo Tomas. Although he was a talented pianist, he later shifted to Architecture.

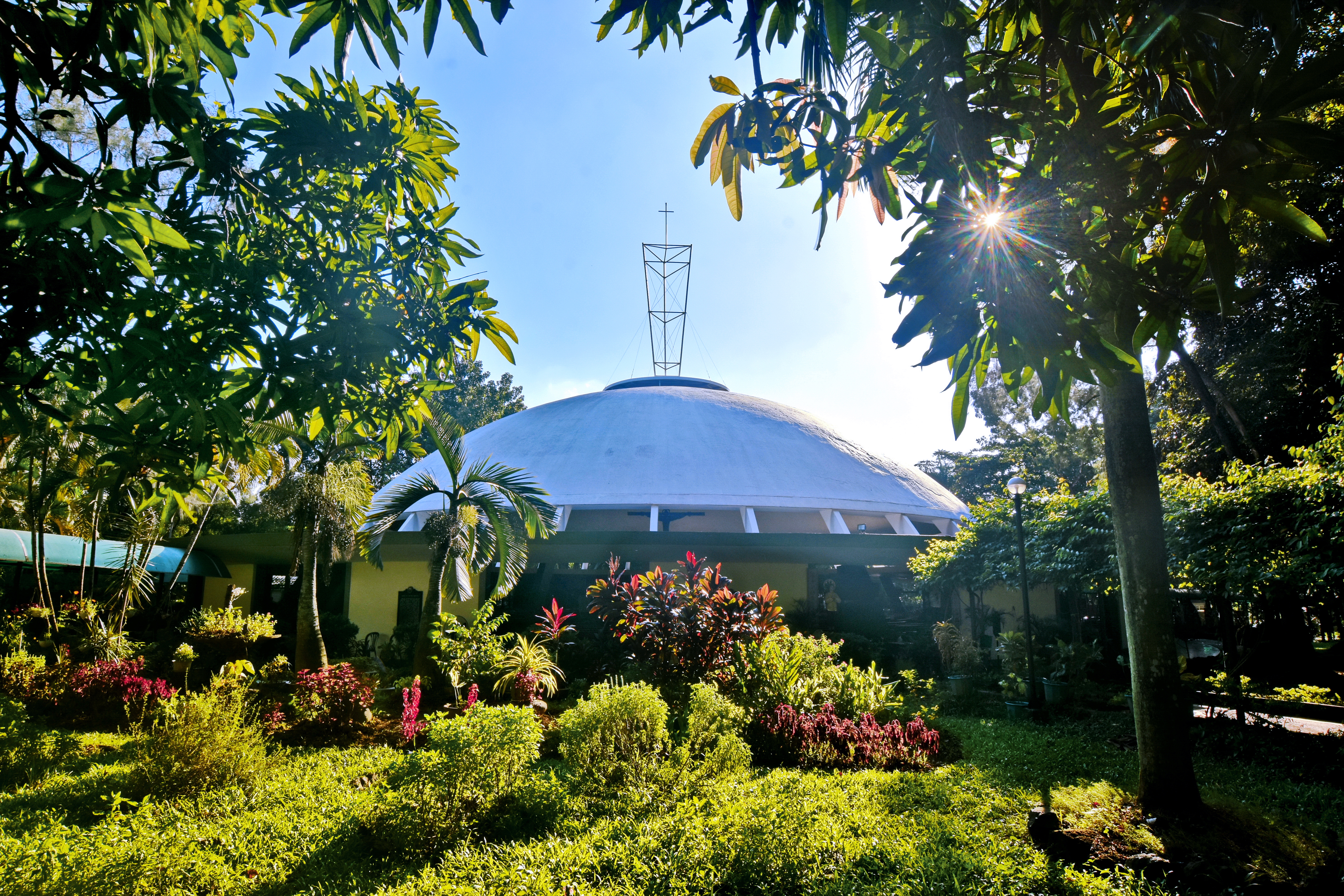
The Church of the Holy Sacrifice in the University of the Philippines Diliman was the first building designed by Locsin to be constructed. Built by Alfredo L. Juinio and fellow UP professors, it is the first circular church and the first thin-shell concrete dome in the Philippines.

In 1955, Fr. John Delaney, S.J., then Catholic Chaplain at the University of the Philippines - Diliman, commissioned Locsin to design a chapel with an open plan and can easily accommodate 1,000 people. The Church of the Holy Sacrifice is the first round chapel in the Philippines to have an altar in the middle, and the first to have a thin shell concrete dome. The floor of the church was designed by Arturo Luz, the Stations of the Cross by Vicente Manansala and Ang Kiukok, and the cross by Napoleon Abueva, all of whom are now National Artists. Alfredo L. Juinio served as the building's structural engineer. Today, the church is recognized as a National Historical Landmark and a Cultural Treasure by the National Historical Institute (now the National Historical Commission of the Philippines) and the National Museum, respectively.

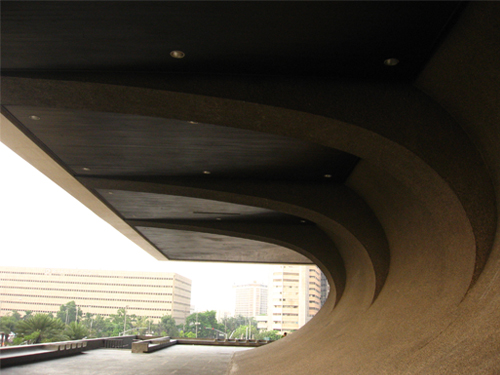
Cantilevers supporting the façade of the Tanghalang Pambansa

On his visit to the United States, Locsin met some of his influences, Paul Rudolph and Eero Saarinen. It was then he realized to use concrete, which was relatively cheap in the Philippines and easy to form, for his buildings.

In 1969, he completed what was to be his most recognizable work, the Theater of Performing Arts (now the Tanghalang Pambansa) of the Cultural Center of the Philippines. The marble façade of the building is cantilevered 12 metres (39 ft) from the terrace by huge arching columns at the sides of the building, giving it the impression of being afloat. A large lagoon in front of the theatre mirrors the building during daytime, while fountains are illuminated by underwater lights at nighttime. The building houses four theaters, a museum of ethnographic art and other temporary exhibits, galleries, and a library on Philippine art and culture.

In 1974, Locsin designed the Folk Arts Theater (now the Tanghalang Francisco Balagtas), which is one of the largest single-span buildings in the Philippines with a span of 60 metres (200 ft). It was completed in only 77 days, in time for the 1974 Miss Universe Pageant. Locsin was also commissioned to build the Philippine International Convention Center, the country's premiere international conference building.

After the Federico Ilustre-designed original terminal of Manila International Airport was destroyed by a fire in 1962, the Philippine government chose Locsin for the rehabilitation design. Serving as an international terminal for 10 years, it later became a domestic terminal upon the opening of what is now the present-day Terminal 1, which was also designed by Locsin. A second fire later damaged the rehabilitated domestic terminal in 1985 and the site is currently occupied by the present-day Terminal 2.

Locsin was also commissioned in 1974 to design the Ayala Museum to house the Ayala art collection. It was known for the juxtaposition of huge blocks to facilitate the interior of the exhibition. Locsin was a close friend of the Ayalas. Before taking the board examination, he took his apprenticeship at Ayala and Company (now the Ayala Corporation) and was asked to design the first building on Ayala Avenue, and several of the Ayalas' residences. When the collection of the Ayala Museum was moved to its current location, the original was demolished with Locsin's permission. The current building was dedicated in 2004, and designed by his firm, L.V. Locsin and Partners, led by his son Leandro Y. Locsin, Jr.

Locsin also designed some of the buildings at the UP Los Baños campus. The Dioscoro Umali Hall, the main auditorium, is clearly an example of his distinct architecture, with its large canopy that makes it resemble the main theatre of the Cultural Center of the Philippines (CCP). Most of his work is concentrated in the Freedom Park, with the Student Union Building which was once damaged by a fire, the Carillon, the Continuing Education Center and the auditorium. He also designed the SEARCA Residences, and several structures at the National Arts Center (housing the Philippine High School for the Arts) at Mt. Makiling, Los Baños, Laguna.

Most of Locsin's work has been within the country, but in 1970, he designed the Philippine Pavilion of the World Expo in Osaka, Japan. His largest single work is the Istana Nurul Iman, the official residence of the Sultan of Brunei. In 1992, he was awarded the Fukuoka Asian Culture Prize.

Locsin's last work was a church in Malaybalay, Bukidnon.

== Personal life ==
Locsin was married to Cecilia Yulo and had two children. One of them, Leandro Yulo Locsin, Jr., nicknamed Andy, currently serves as a design consultant at L.V. Locsin and Partners.

== Death and legacy ==
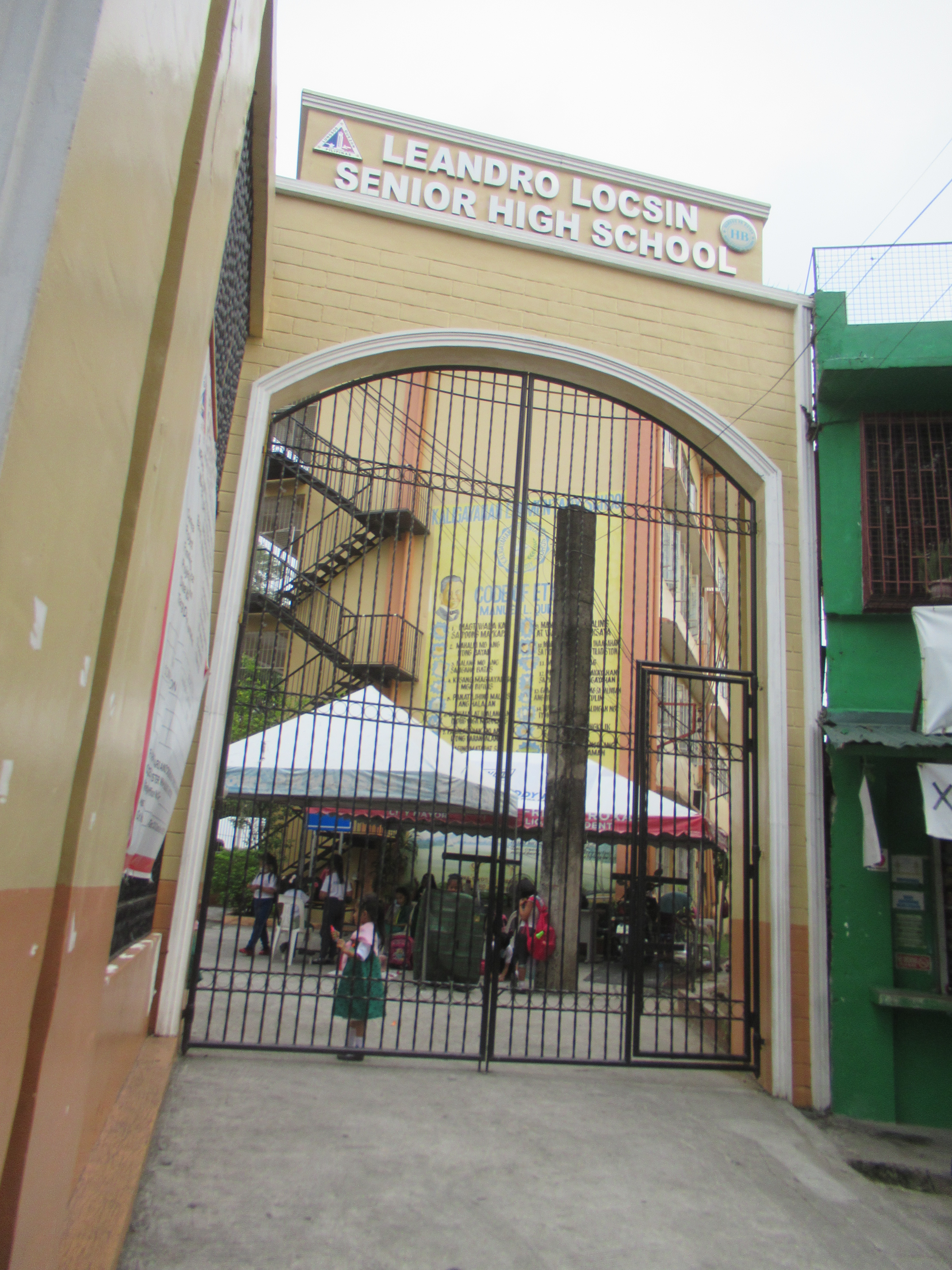
Leandro V. Locsin Senior High School (Kaligayahan, Novaliches)

He died in the early morning hours on November 15, 1994, at the Makati Medical Center in Makati after suffering a stroke 10 days earlier. His remains were interred in the Yulo Family Mausoleum located beside the St. Joseph the Worker Parish in Canlubang, Calamba City, Laguna.

The campus of De La Salle-Canlubang, built in 2003 on a land donated by his family, was named after him. A senior high school in Novaliches, Quezon City is named in his honor.

== Works ==
Churches

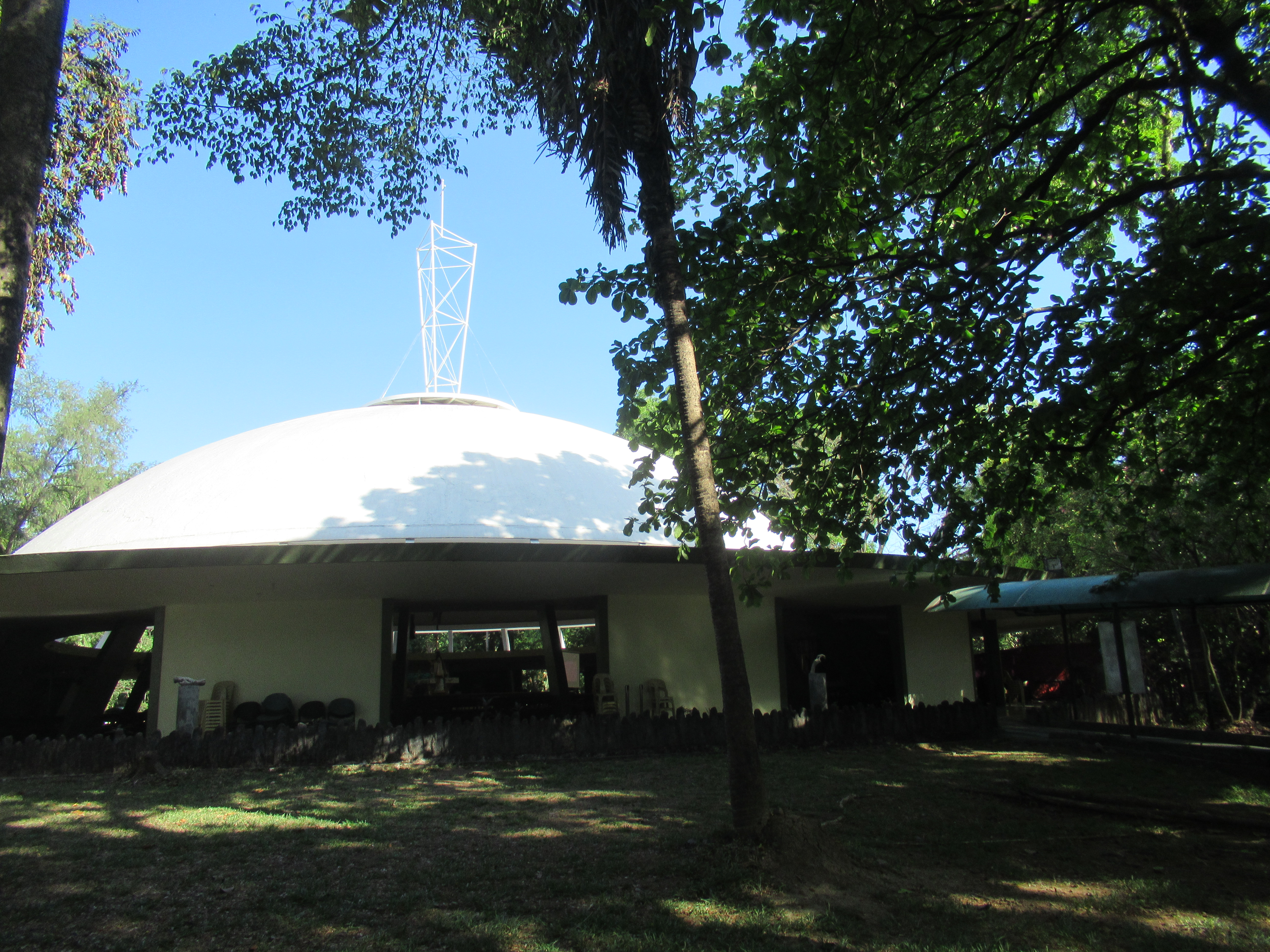
Parish of the Holy Sacrifice, University of the Philippines Diliman

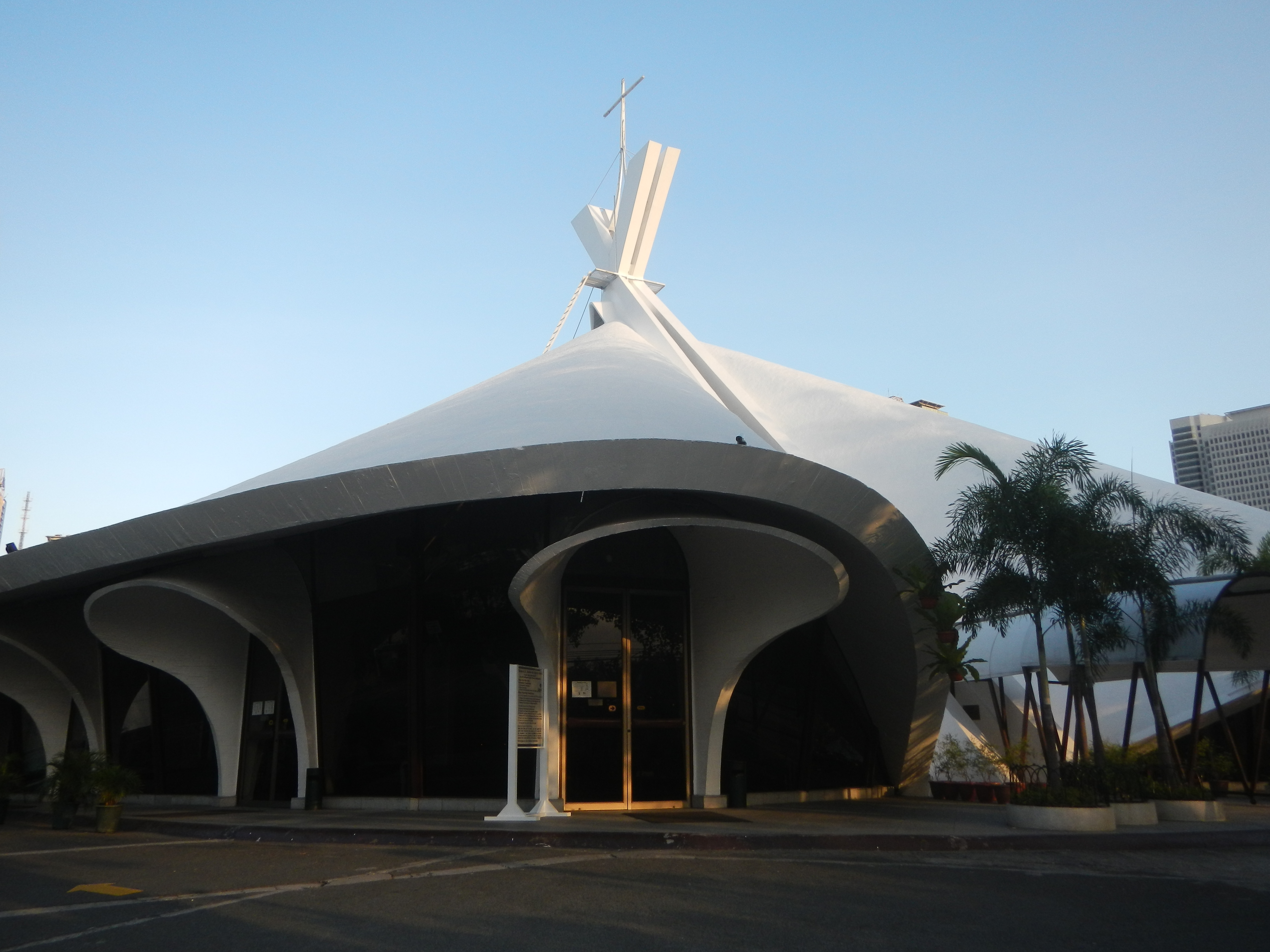
Saint Andrew the Apostle Church, Makati

- Parish of the Holy Sacrifice, University of the Philippines Diliman, Quezon City, 1955
- Metropolitan Cathedral of the Immaculate Conception, Ozamiz City, 1960
- Manila Memorial Park Chapel, Paranaque, 1965 (renovated in 1990, 1995, 2000, 2010 & 2020)
- Doña Corazon L. Montelibano Chapel, University of St. La Salle, Bacolod, 1965
- Saint Andrew the Apostle Church, Bel-Air Village, Makati, 1968
- Holy Cross Memorial Chapel, Novaliches, 1969
- Church of the Immaculate Heart of Mary, UP Village, Quezon City, 1970
- Chapel of St. Alphonsus Ligouri, Magallanes Village, Makati, 1970 (destroyed by fire in 2004, now replaced and rebuilt by Arch. Dominic Galicia in 2007.)
- Cadiz Church, Negros Occidental, 1972
- Church of the Monastery of the Transfiguration, Malaybalay, Bukidnon, 1983
- St. John the Baptist Church, Kalibo, Aklan, 1993
- St. Joseph the Worker Parish Church, Bacnotan, La Union, 1994

Public Buildings

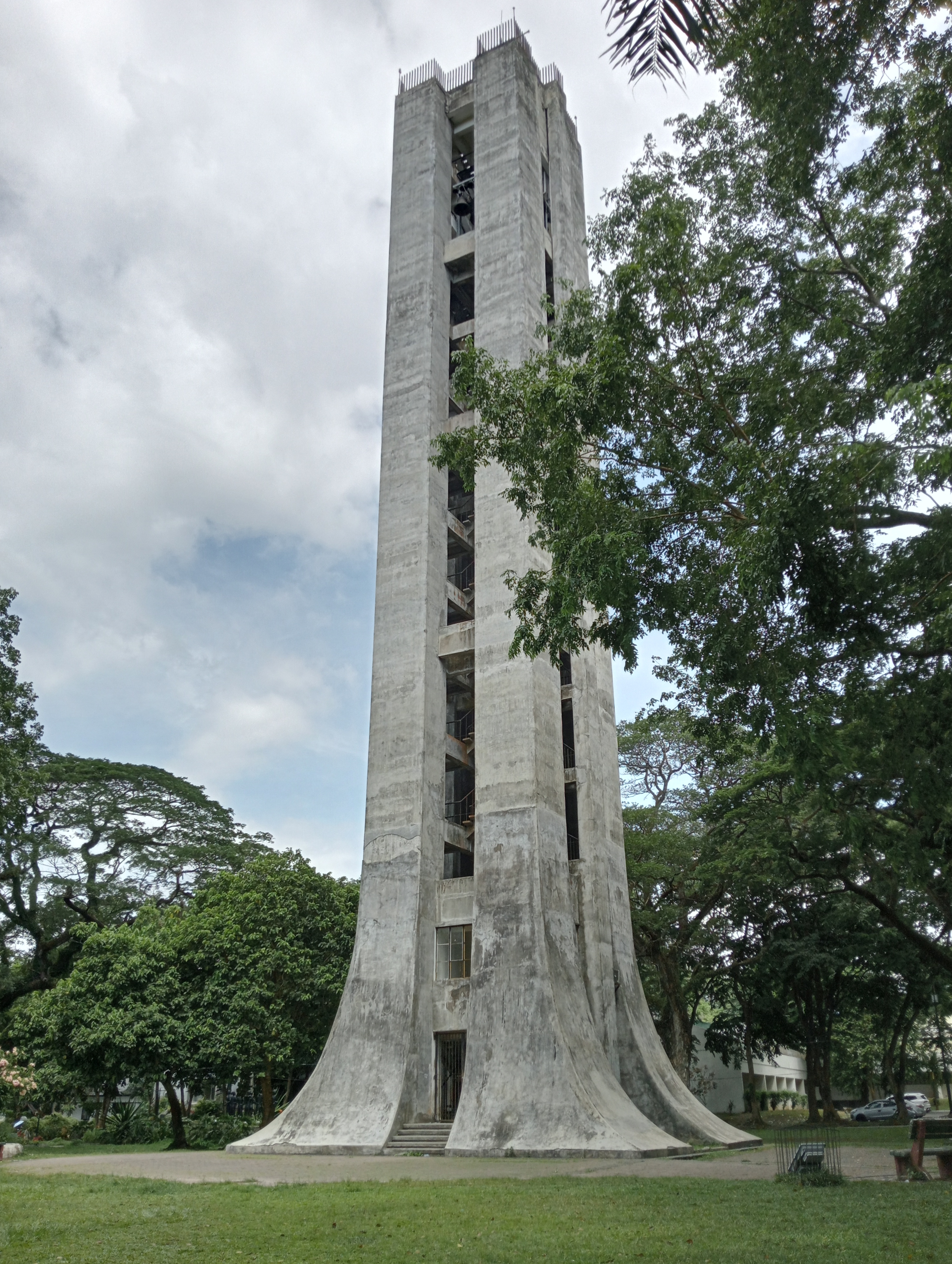
Rizal Memorial Centenary Carillon, University of the Philippines Los Baños

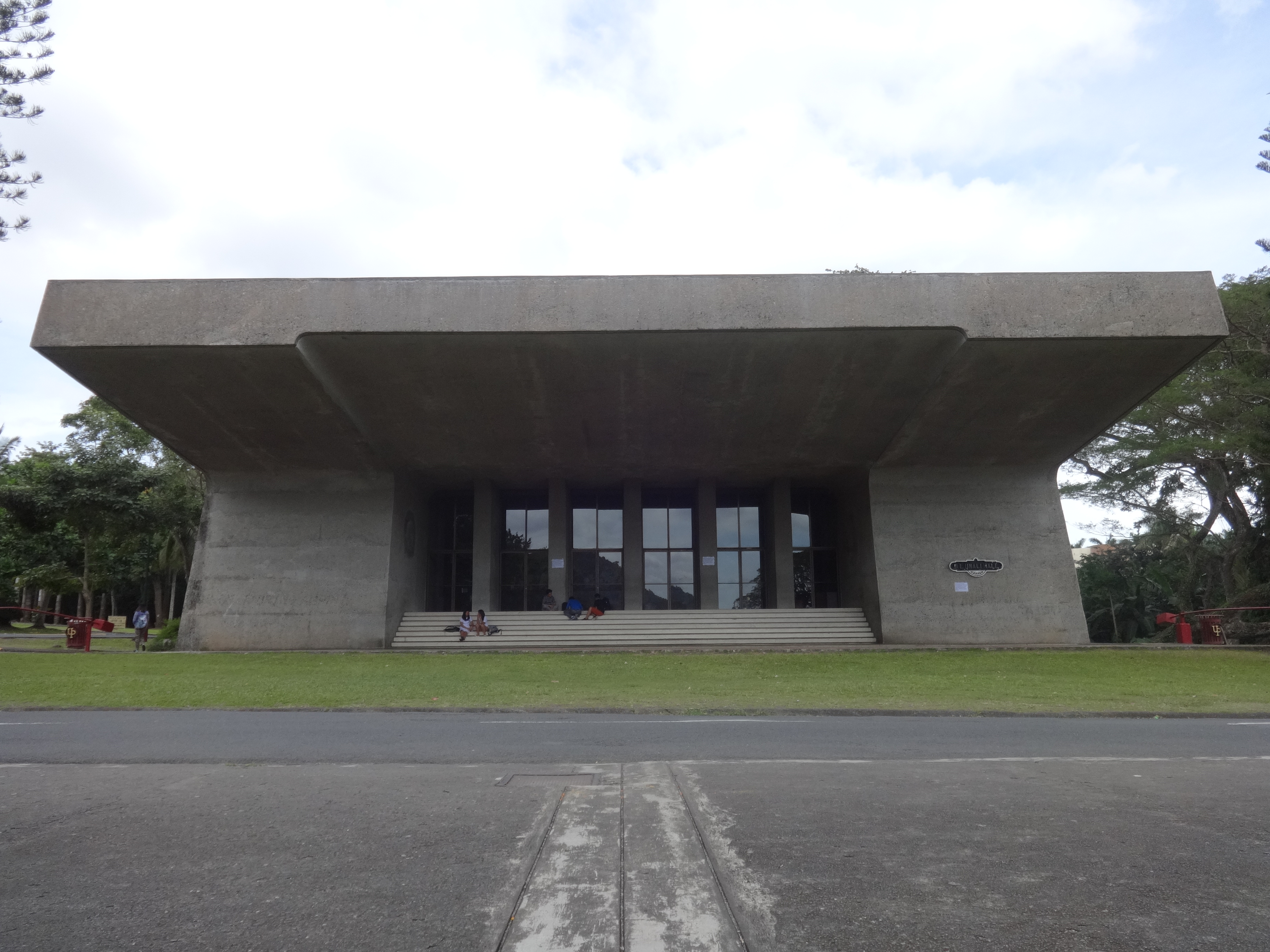
Dioscoro L. Umali Hall (formerly UPCA Auditorium), University of the Philippines Los Baños

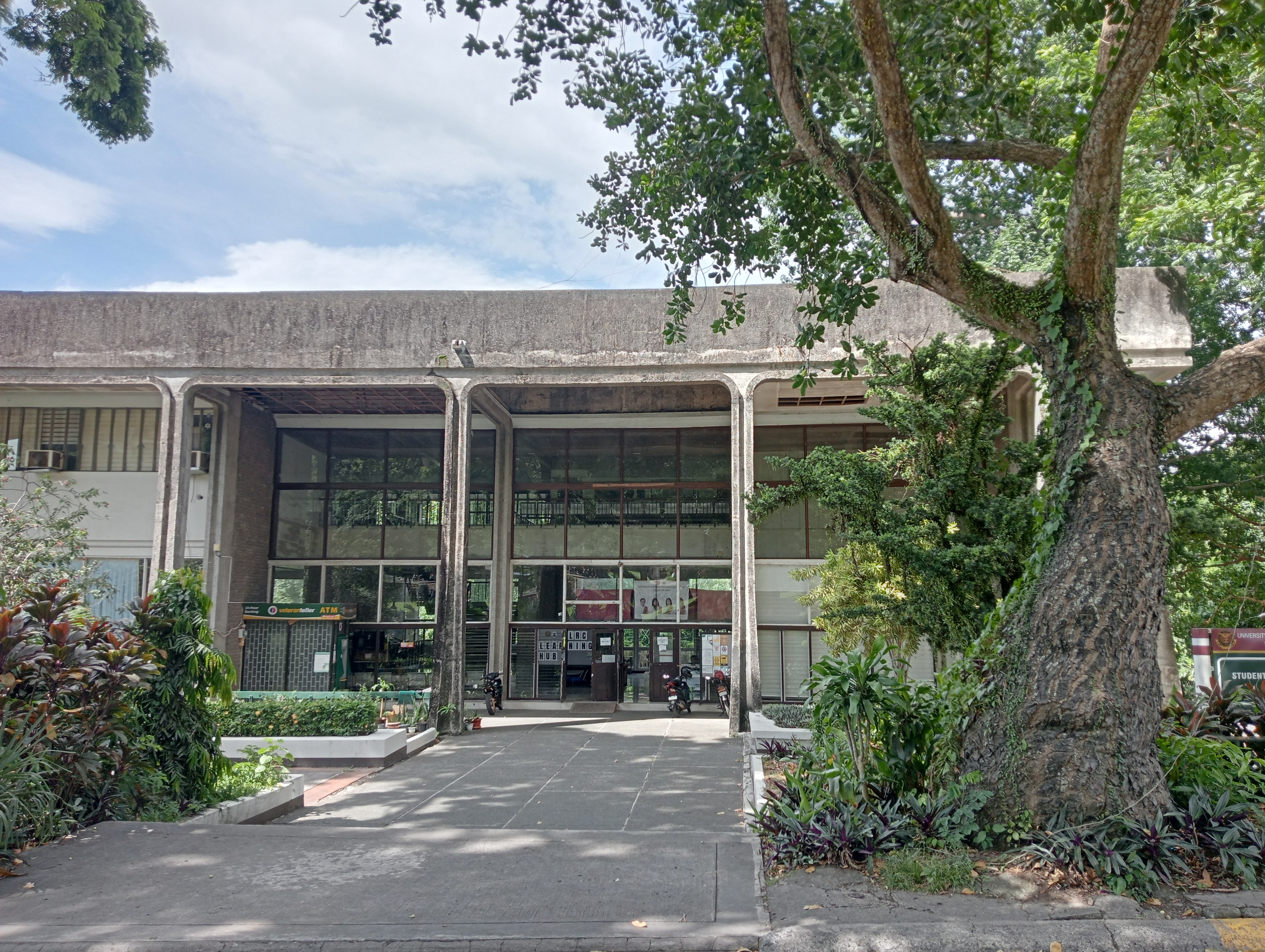
Student Union Building, University of the Philippines Los Baños

- Makati Stock Exchange Building, 1971
- Renovation of the Old Manila International Airport Terminal, Phase 1, Pasay, 1972 (site is now occupied by NAIA Terminal 2)
- Design Center of the Philippines, CCP Complex, Manila, 1974
- Fast Food Center, CCP Complex, 1976 (renovated in 1996, 2006, 2011 & 2016)
- Tanghalang Francisco Balagtas, 1974 (formerly known as Folk Arts Theater)
- Philippine Center for International Trade and Exhibitions, CCP Complex, Manila, 1976 (now demolished in 1995, replaced by Star City)
- Philippine International Convention Center
- Tanghalang Pambansa
- Francisco Bangoy International Airport Terminal Building, Davao City, 1980
- Rizal Park Amphitheater now renamed as "Rizal Open Air Auditorium" (1981; renovated in 1991, 2001, 2011 & 2021)
- Girl Scouts of the Philippines Headquarters, Manila, 1993
- Original Ayala Museum (Demolished, now replaced a new bigger museum and designed by his son, Arch. Leandro "Andy" Locsin, Jr. in 2004)
- National Arts Center, Mt. Makiling, Los Baños, Laguna
- Expo '70 - Philippine Pavilion (now demolished & now currently replaced as Expo '70 Memorial Commemoration Park)
- First National City Bank Building (later known as Citibank Center, now renamed as BDO Towers Paseo)
- Istana Nurul Iman, Brunei Darussalam
- Ninoy Aquino International Airport Terminal 1
- University of the Philippines Los Baños - Rizal Memorial Centenary Carillon
- University of the Philippines Los Baños - Obdulia F. Sison Hall (Continuing Education Center)
- University of the Philippines Los Baños - Dioscoro L. Umali Hall (formerly UPCA Auditorium)
- University of the Philippines Los Baños - Searca Residence Hotel (formerly SEARCA Dormitory Building)
- University of the Philippines Los Baños - Student Union Building
- University of the Philippines Los Baños - Men's Residence Hall
- University of the Philippines Los Baños - Women's Residence Hall

Hotels

Manila Hotel's 1975 high-rise building

- Davao Insular Hotel, Davao City, 1961 (now renamed as Waterfront Insular Hotel)
- InterContinental Manila, Ayala Avenue, Makati, 1969 (closed on December 31, 2015, replaced by One Ayala)
- Hyatt Regency Hotel (now occupied by Midas Hotel and Casino Manila in 2011)
- Mandarin Oriental Manila (closed on September 9, 2014, replaced by Park Central Towers)
- Manila Hotel (New building)
- Philippine Plaza Hotel, 1976 (now Sofitel Philippine Plaza Manila, now closed in 2024)

Commercial Buildings

- Ayala Building 1, Ayala Ave, Makati, 1958
- Filipinas Life Assurance Company Building, Ayala Avenue, Makati, 1958
- Commercial Credit Corporation Building, Buendia Avenue, Makati, 1962
- Integrated Realty Building, Buendia Avenue, Makati, 1962
- Philamlife Company Building, Cagayan de Oro, 1963
- Sarmiento Building, Ayala Avenue, Makati, 1965 (now SSS Makati Building)
- American International Underwriters Building, Ayala Avenue, Makati, 1965
- Sikatuna Building, Ayala Avenue, Makati, 1966
- J.M. Tuason Building, Ayala Ave, Makati, 1966
- Locsin Building, EDSA, Makati, 1966
- Filipinas Life Assurance Co. Building, Iloilo City, 1969
- Philippine Bank of Commerce, Ayala Avenue, Makati, 1969
- Magnolia Dairy Products Plant, Aurora Boulevard, Quezon City, 1969
- Amalgamated Building, Makati, 1969
- Filipinas Life Assurance Co. Building, Mandaue, Cebu, 1969
- Union Carbide Philippines, Mandaue, Cebu, 1970
- Filipinas Life Assurance Co. Building, Naga, 1970
- Filipinas Life Assurance Co. Building, Cagayan de Oro, 1971
- Filipinas Life Executive Center, Mandaue, 1971
- Romago Building, Mandaluyong, 1971
- Filipinas Life Assurance Co. Building, Batangas City, 1971
- Filipinas Life Assurance Co. Building, Dagupan, 1971
- Filipinas Life Assurance Co. Building Annex, Ayala Avenue, Makati, 1972
- Filipinas Life Assurance Co. Building, Davao City, 1972
- Asian Reinsurance Pool Building, Legaspi Village, Makati, 1972
- Philippine Commercial & Industrial Bank Building, Greenhills, Mandaluyong, 1972
- Filipinas Life Assurance Co. Building, Tacloban, 1976
- Filipinas Life Assurance Co. Building, Cabanatuan, 1976
- EEI Building, Pasig, Metro Manila, 1978
- Canlubang Golf & Country Club, Canlubang, Laguna, 1978
- Valle Verde Country Club, Pasig, Metro Manila, 1978
- Philippine Commercial & Industrial Bank Building, Batangas City, 1978
- Canlubang Sports Complex, Canlubang, Laguna, 1979
- PLDT Building (Ramon Cojuangco Building), Makati Avenue, Makati, 1982
- Greenbelt Square Cinema, Paseo de Roxas, Makati, 1982 (now renovated in 2002 and now renamed Greenbelt 1)
- Philippine Commercial & Industrial Bank Tower 1; Philippine Commercial International Bank (PCIBank), Makati Avenue cor H.V. Dela Costa, Makati, 1983 (now BDO Corporate Center North Tower)
- Philippine Commercial & Industrial Bank Tower 2; Philippine Commercial International Bank (PCIBank), Makati Avenue cor H.V. Dela Costa, Makati, 1992 (now BDO Corporate Center South Tower)
- Benguet Center, Mandaluyong, Metro Manila, 1983 (now demolished in 2011); BDO Ortigas Center
- Island Development Bank, Brunei, 1983
- L. V. Locsin Building, Makati Avenue, Makati, 1987
- Samba-Likhaan AILM, Quezon City, 1992
- Ayala-Laguna Technopark Administration Building, Sta Rosa, Laguna, 1993
- Hi-Cement Administration Building, Norzagaray, Bulacan, 1994
- Business World Publishing Corporation Building, 1994
- Bacnotan Cement Plant Administration Building, Bacnotan, La Union, 1995
- Tower One & Exchange Plaza, Ayala Avenue, Makati, 1995
- Ayala Avenue Pedestrianization Underpass, Ayala Avenue, Makati, 1966

Sets for Theatrical Production

- Sets for Various Ballets by Ricardo Casell, 1954
- Lady Be Good production by Frederico Elizarde, 1954
- Noche Buena, CCP Dance Co., 1970
- Jewels, CCP Dance Co., 1970
- Madame Butterfly, CCP Dance Co., 1972
- Lucifer, Martha Graham Dance Co., for its 50th Anniversary Celebration, New York, 1975
- Adoration, Martha Graham Dance Co., New York, 1976
- Point of Crossing, Martha Graham Dance Co., New York, 1976
- Larawan ng Pilipino Bilang Artista, CCP, 1989
- La Traviata, CCP, July 1990
- Madame Butterfly, CCP 1994
- Midsummer Night’s Dream, Ballet Philiipines, 1994
- Suite for Lindy, from Ballet Philippines’ Ellias, CCP, 1995

Interior Design

- Leandro V. Locsin Residence, Forbes Park, Makati, 1963
- Locsin Architectural Offices, Edsa, Makati, 1966
- Laguna Estate and Development Corp. Office, Makati, 1966
- Theater for the Performing Arts, Cultural Center of the Philippines, Roxas Blvd., Manila, 1969
- C.J. Yulo and Sons Executive Offices, Pasong Tamo, Makati, 1970
- Philippine Bank of Commerce Executive Suites, Ayala Avenue, Makati, 1971
- U.S.I. Executive Offices, Makati Stock Exchange Building, Ayala Avenue, Makati 1971
- Filipinas Life Assurance Co. (Annex) Executive, Makati, 1971
- Ayala Corporation Offices and Penthouse, Makati Stock Exchange Building, Ayala Avenue, Makati, 1972
- Leandro V. Locsin Beach House, Puerto Galera, Oriental Mindoro, 1972
- Kodak Philippines Ltd. Offices, Pasong Tamo, Makati, 1974
- Ayala Museum Executive Offices, Makati Avenue, Makati, 1974 (now renovated in 2004 by his son Arch. Andy Locsin)
- Philippine Center for Population and Development, Makati, 1974
- Nutrition Center of the Philippines, Makati, 1975
- Asian Center and Research for Social Welfare, Makati, 1976 (formerly known as Social Welfare and Development Center for Asia and the Pacific, later renamed as DSWD Academy)
- Philippine International Convention Center, CCP Complex, Manila, 1976
- Philippine Plaza Hotel, CCP Complex, Manila, 1976 (now Sofitel Philippine Plaza Hotel)
- Manila Hotel, Luneta, Manila, 1976
- Locsin Offices, Locsin Building, Ayala Avenue, Makati, 1989
- Supreme Court Building, Taft Avenue, Manila, 1991
- French Embassy Headquarters, Makati, 1992
- Phinma Group of Companies HRD, Makati, 1994
- Hi-Cement Administration Building, Norzagaray, Bulacan, 1994
- Tower One & Exchange Plaza, Makati, 1994
- Filipinas Heritage Library (formerly Nielsen Tower), Makati Avenue, Makati, 1996

== See also ==
- Culture of the Philippines
