= Church of the Holy Sacrifice (UP Diliman) =

Roman Catholic church in Quezon City, Philippines

- Parroquia del Santo Sacrifico (Spanish)
- UP Chapel
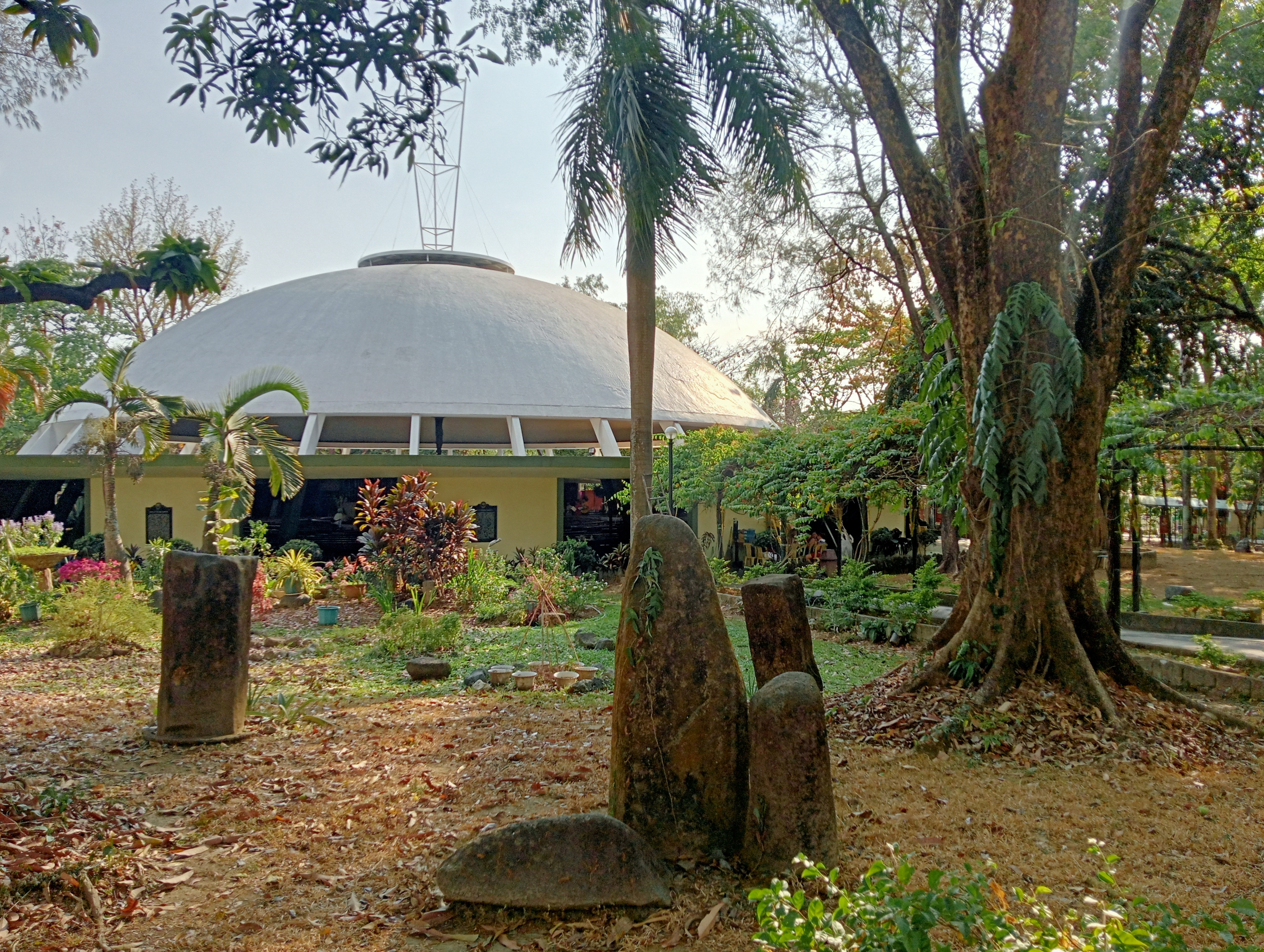
- The Church in 2023
- Church of the Holy Sacrifice
- 14°39′32″N 121°04′16″E
- Location: University of the Philippines Diliman Campus
- Country: Philippines
- Denomination: Catholic
- Website: www.parishoftheholysacrifice.ph

History
- Status: Parish church
- Consecrated: December 21, 1955

Architecture
- Functional status: active
- Heritage designation: National Historical Landmark; Cultural Treasure
- Designated: January 12, 2005
- Architect: Leandro Locsin
- Architectural type: Church building

Administration
- Diocese: Roman Catholic Diocese of Cubao

Clergy
- Bishop(s): Elias Lumayog Ayuban Jr., CMF
- Pastor: Nelson C. Orqueta

The Church of the Holy Sacrifice, also known as the Parish of the Holy Sacrifice, is a landmark Roman Catholic Church in the University of the Philippines Diliman campus. It belongs to the Diocese of Cubao and its present parish priest is Rev. Fr. Nelson C. Orqueta. More popularly known as the UP Chapel, the church was constructed under the supervision of Fr. John P. Delaney, who began ministering to the spiritual needs of the campus in 1947.

Known for its architectural design and the works of five national artists, the church is recognized as a National Historical Landmark and a Cultural Treasure by the National Historical Commission of the Philippines, and the National Museum of the Philippines respectively. It was designed by the late National Artist of the Philippines for Architecture, Leandro Locsin, one of four National Artists who collaborated on the project. Alfredo Juinio served as the structural engineer for the project.

The church is adjacent to the U.P. Health Service Building and the former U.P. Shopping Center, and is serviced by all of the university's jeepney routes.

== History ==
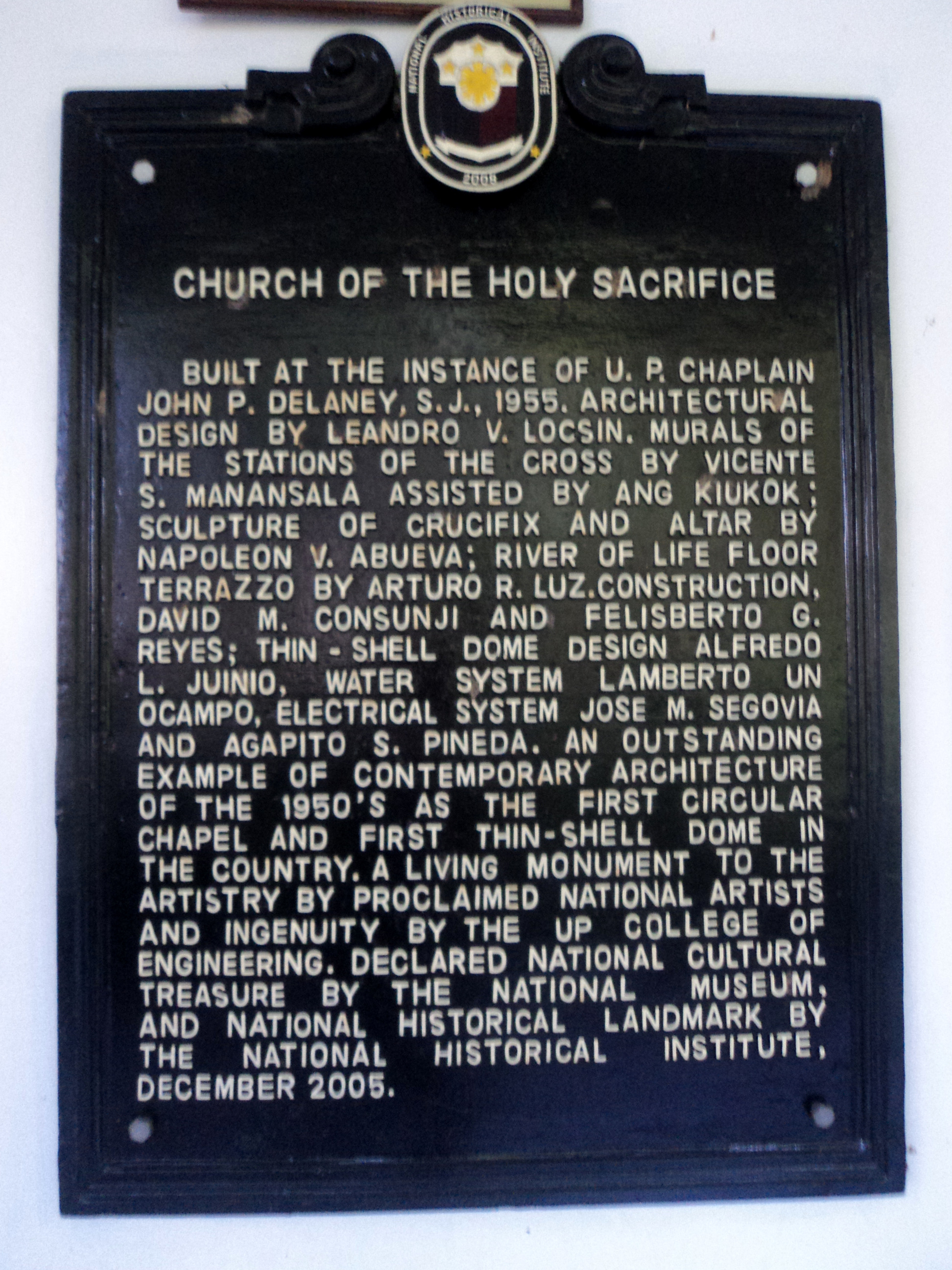
Historical marker installed in 2008 by the National Historical Institute commemorating the church

Before the Church of the Holy Sacrifice was erected in the early 1950s, a university church served the University of the Philippines community, under the apostolate of the Society of Jesus. Fr. John P. Delaney served as the first Jesuit chaplain.

The domed Church of the Holy Sacrifice (PHS) is both an architectural wonder and a rallying point of faith. Catholics in the faculty, student body, staff, and alumni worked tirelessly in the early 1950s to raise funds for the structure. The faculty pledged a part of their monthly salary, while the students contributed from their own allowances to fund the construction of the church.

In December 1955, the inner structure of the church which includes the pews, crucifix, tabernacle, altar, marble floor design, and skylight were worked on, as well as the outside landscaping, pathways, and fences. Eventually, the construction of the church was finished through the efforts of the UP Catholic Community, headed by Fr. Delaney, and the young UP graduates such as Engr. David Consunji, Engr. Alfredo Juinio, and National Artist Leandro Locsin. Its interior was an obra maestra of yet another conglomeration of now National Artists: Vicente Manansala and Ang Kiukok, Arturo Luz, and Napoleon Abueva. Structural, electric and water systems were also planned by Felisberto G. Reyes, Lamberto UN Ocampo, and Jose M. Segovia with Agapito S. Pineda.

On December 21, 1955, Rufino Santos, Archbishop of Manila, officiated at the first Mass in the newly constructed church and on December 24, 1955, Fr. Delaney celebrated Mass and delivered his last homily entitled “The Reality of Christmas”. A transcript of his this last homily is published in "The Chapel Chismis", a collection of Fr. Delaney's letters to the UP community.

On May 30, 1977, the chaplaincy was elevated to a parish by Cardinal Jaime Sin. Msgr. Manny Gabriel became its first parish priest. To date, eleven parish priests have served the parish; two of them were later ordained bishops: Bishop Mylo Hubert Vergara of the Diocese of Pasig and Archbishop Ramon Arguelles of the Archdiocese of Lipa.

Parish Priests	Tenure
Msgr. Manny Gabriel	1977 - 1984
Msgr. Chito Bernardo	1984 - 1986
Fr. Ramon Arguelles	1986 - 1988
Fr. Bayani Valenzuela	1988 -1996
Fr. Roberto P. Reyes	1996 - 2003
Msgr. Mylo Hubert Vergara	2003 - 2005
Fr. Arthur Opiniano	2005 - 2006
Fr. Raymond Joseph Arre	2006 - 2012
Fr. Henry Ferreras	2012 - 2019
Fr. Jose Tupino III	2019 - 2024
Fr. Nelson C. Orqueta	2024 - Present

== Architecture and interior ==
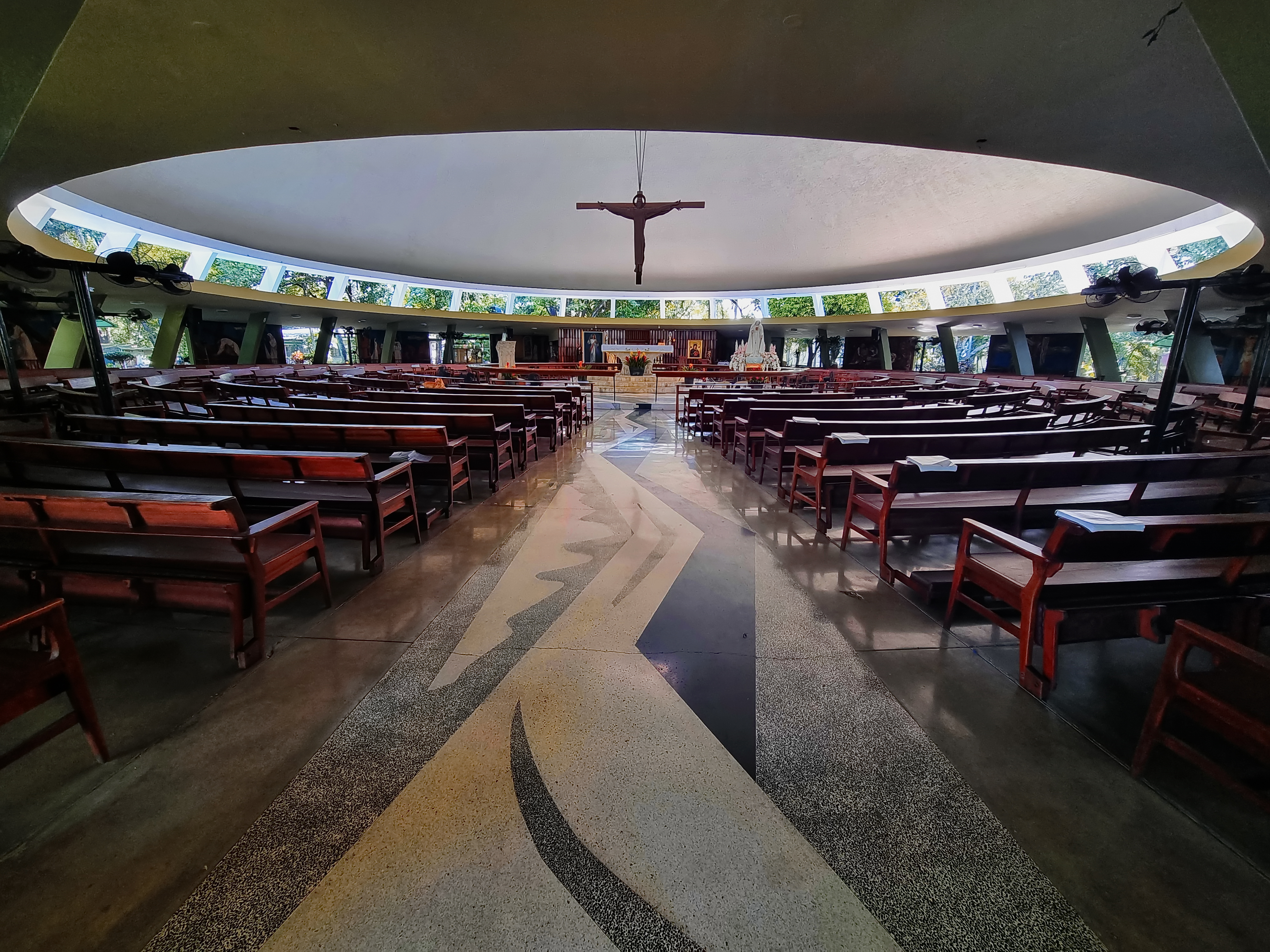
Church interior in 2022

Initially, Leandro Locsin designed the church for the Ossorio family, who were planning to build a church in Negros. Unfortunately, the plans for the church were scrapped when Frederic Ossorio, the head of the family, left for the United States. However, in 1955, Father Delaney commissioned Locsin to design a Church that was open and could easily accommodate 1,000 people. The Church of Holy Sacrifice became the first circular church with the altar in its center in the country, and the first to have a thin shell concrete dome. This was his first major architectural commission.

Locsin chose the round plan as the most suited for giving the congregation a sense of participation in the Mass. The center of the plan is the altar, which is elevated from the floor by three steps. The separation of the choir and congregation was dissolved through this design. The ceiling of the concrete dome church was left bare and a dramatic use of colored lights mark the changing seasons of worship.

The dome of the church is supported by thirty two columns located along its rim. These columns terminate a third of the way up where they support the ledge-like ring beam. This ring beam, in turn, supports the three-inch thick concrete shell of the dome that spans 29.26 metres (96.0 ft). The unique design of the dome allows in natural lighting and ventilation. In the middle of the dome is a circular skylight, which supports the triangular bell tower. The bell tower, then extends to the interior, supporting the crucifix. The arrangement of the interior of the church is concentric, with the altar in the middle.

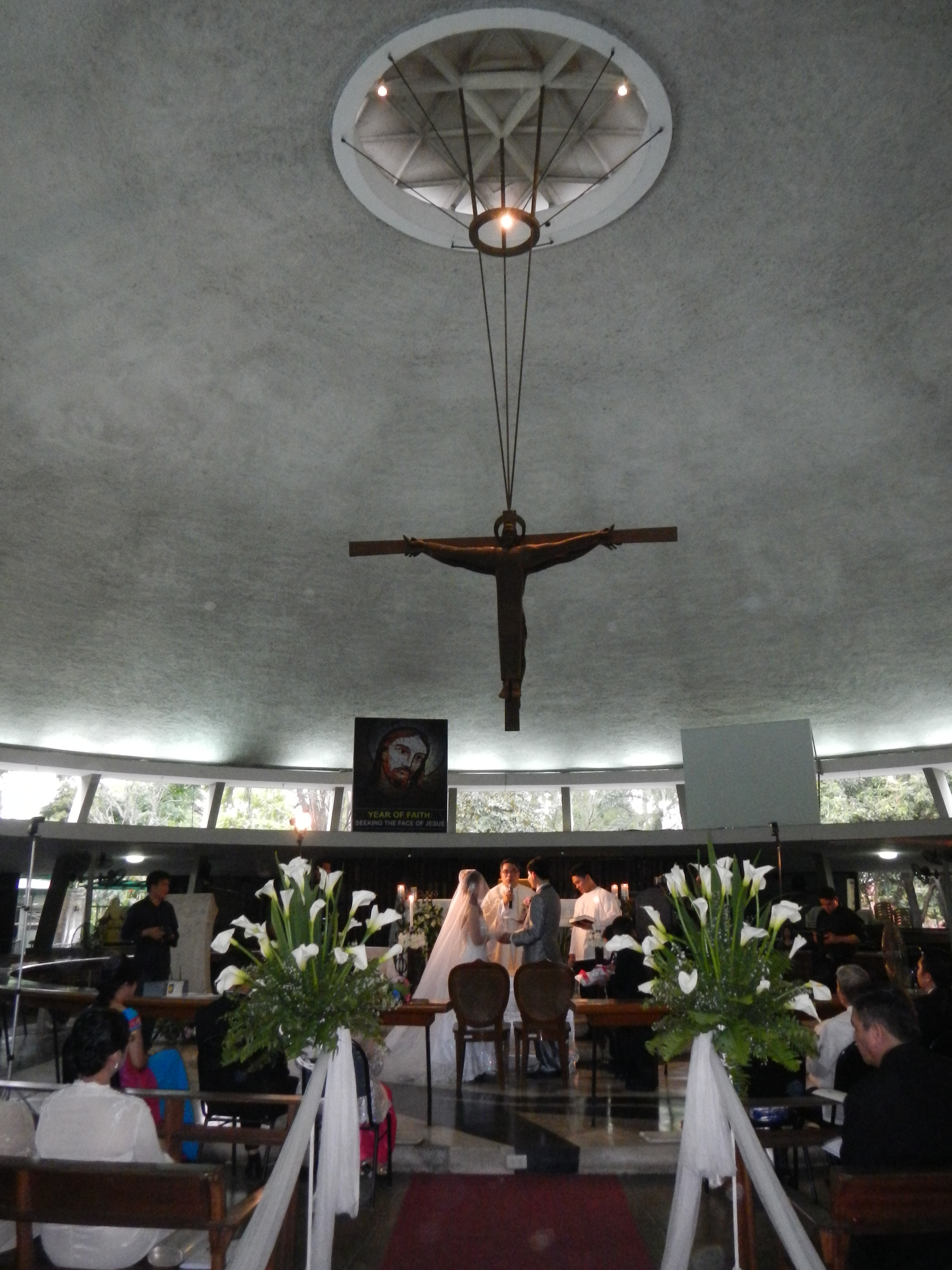
The Centerpiece Sculpture of the Crucified and Risen Christ of the Church of the Holy Sacrifice by Napoleon Abueva

The fifteen murals depicting the traditional Stations of the Cross that adorn the circular walls are by Vicente Manansala assisted by Ang Kiukok. The fifteenth mural of the "Resurrection of Christ" is on the wall of the sacristy. The cross, which uniquely depicts the two figures of Christ: Christ the Victim (Crucified Christ) and Christ the Eternal Priest (Risen Christ), and the marble altar are the handiwork of Napoleon Abueva. This dual image highlights Christ’s role both as the sacrifice offered on the cross and as the eternal high priest who offers that sacrifice in the Mass. The floor mural, executed in terazzo and radiating from the altar, is by Arturo Luz. This floor mural is also called the "River of Life". Fernando Zobel de Ayala had studies to fill the outer wall with calligraphic interpretations. However, the project was not executed. In 1968, Jose Maceda, another national artist, premiered his concert, Pagsamba at the PHS, and repeated it in 1978 and 1998 at the same venue.

In January 2005, the church was recognized as a National Historical Landmark and a Cultural Treasure by the National Historical Institute and the National Museum, respectively. During the recognition ceremony, National Historical Institute Chairman Ambeth R. Ocampo lauded the church as a "masterpiece of Filipino artistry and ingenuity".

Repairs of the church were planned on early 2020, but was postponed to begin on July 2020 due to the pandemic. The rehabilitation project started through a series of consultations with UP officials in an effort to bring back the 65-year-old building’s original state. Developer DMCI Homes facilitated the following repairs in the church: repair of masonry cracks; de-clogging of downspouts and drains; installation of new electrical fixtures; and, exterior repainting on the church's iconic dome and roof, as well as of its walls, columns, eaves, under slabs, ceilings, and railings. The murals depicting the Stations of the Cross, the marble altar, the floor mural, and the cross at the center of the church were left untouched. On March 26, 2021, repairs and repainting of the church were finished.

== Boundaries ==
From the junction of Don Mariano Marcos Ave., and Juan Luna St., East, through Juan Luna St., Southward through the Eastern Limits of East: From the Eastern limits of Pook Dagohoy, Southward thru Katipunan Ave., Eastward through Montalban St., Southward through the Eastern limits of UP High School and UP Integrated School.

== Landmark ==
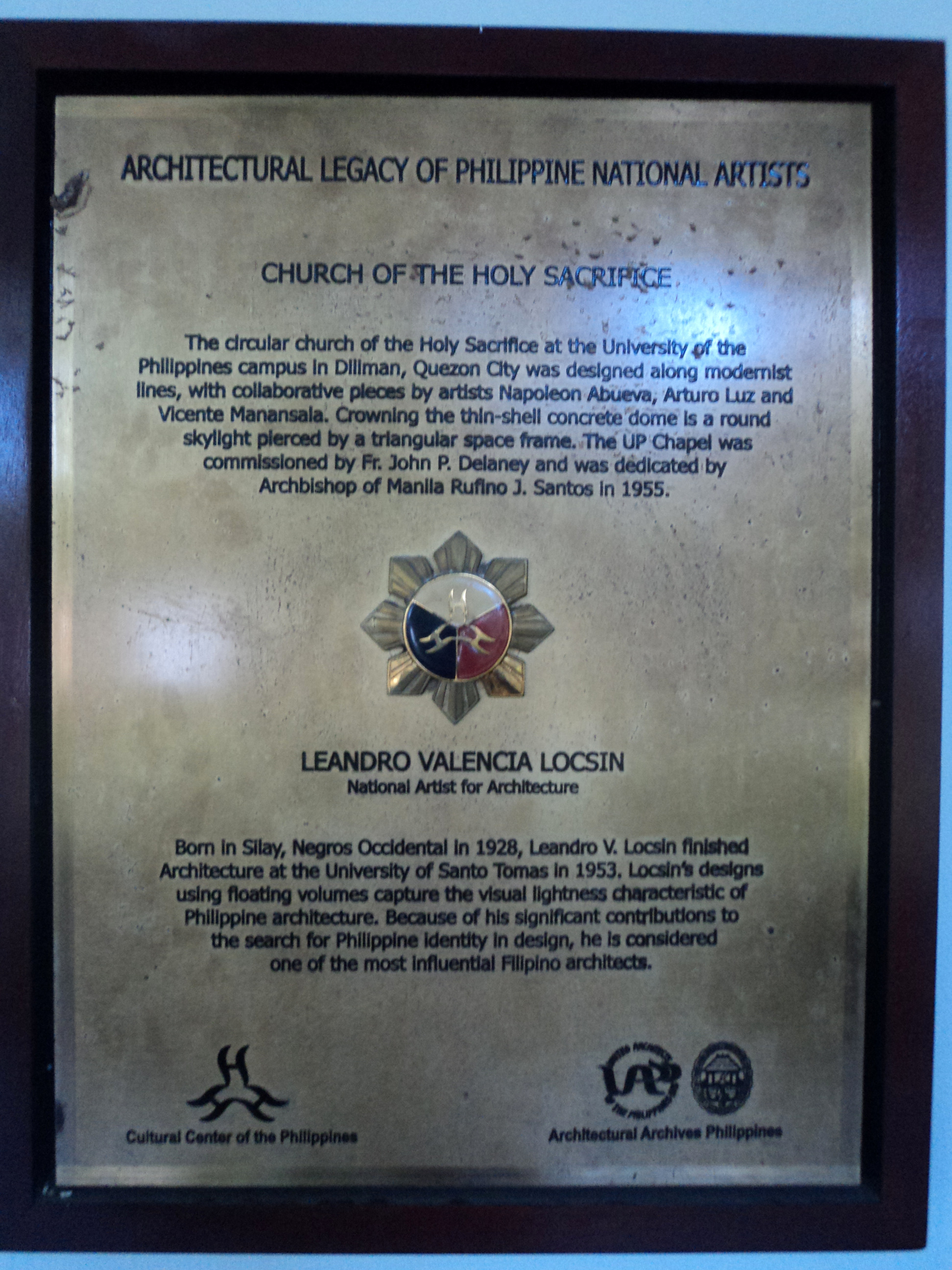
Architectural legacy plaque

The church has been declared a Philippines National Historical Landmark.

== See also ==
- University of the Philippines Diliman
- Roman Catholic Diocese of Cubao
- Thin-shell structure
- Leandro Locsin
