= Tanghalang Pambansa =

Arts center in Metro Manila, Philippines

National Theater
- Tanghalang Pambansa
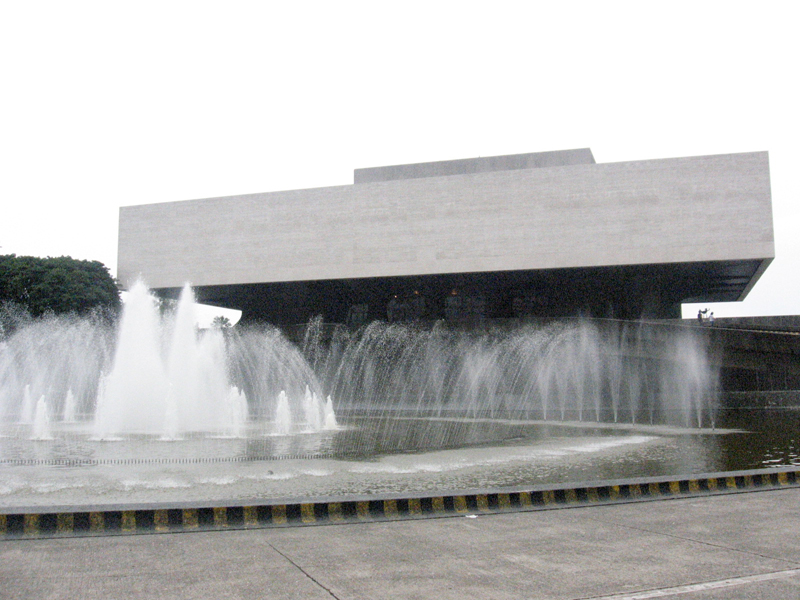

- Location in Manila Location in Metro Manila Location in Luzon Location in the Philippines
- Former names: Theater of Performing Arts
- Address: Cultural Center of the Philippines Complex, Roxas Boulevard, Malate; Manila; Philippines
- Coordinates: 14°33′24″N 120°58′51″E
- Operator: Cultural Center of the Philippines
- Capacity: Main Theater: 1,853 seats; Little Theater: 421 seats; Studio Theater: 240 seats; Film Theater: 100 seats
- Type: National theater

Construction
- Opened: September 8, 1969; 57 years ago
- Architect: Leandro V. Locsin

The Tanghalang Pambansa (English: National Theater), formerly Theater of Performing Arts, is a theater located in the Cultural Center of the Philippines Complex in Manila, Philippines.

It is the flagship venue and principal office of the Cultural Center of the Philippines. Designed by National Artist for Architecture Leandro Locsin, its design was based and expanded upon the unconstructed Philippine-American Friendship Center. The Tanghalan is a primary example of the architect's signature style known as the floating volume, a trait that can be seen in structures indigenous to the Philippines such as the nipa hut. It houses three performing arts venues, one theater for film screenings, galleries, a museum and the center's library and archives. Being a work of a National Artist, the brutalist structure is qualified to be an important cultural landmark as stipulated in Republic Act No. 10066.

Construction began in 1966, with Alfredo Juinio serving as structural engineer and Filipino firm DM Consunji as the builder. Originally called the Theater of Performing Arts, it was completed and inaugurated in 1969. Its first major renovation occurred in 2005 for the opening and closing ceremonies of the 112th General Assembly of the Inter-Parliamentary Union held in Manila. Included in the renovation were cleaning and replacement of the marble trim, installation of a new air-conditioning system and new carpeting.

== Architecture ==
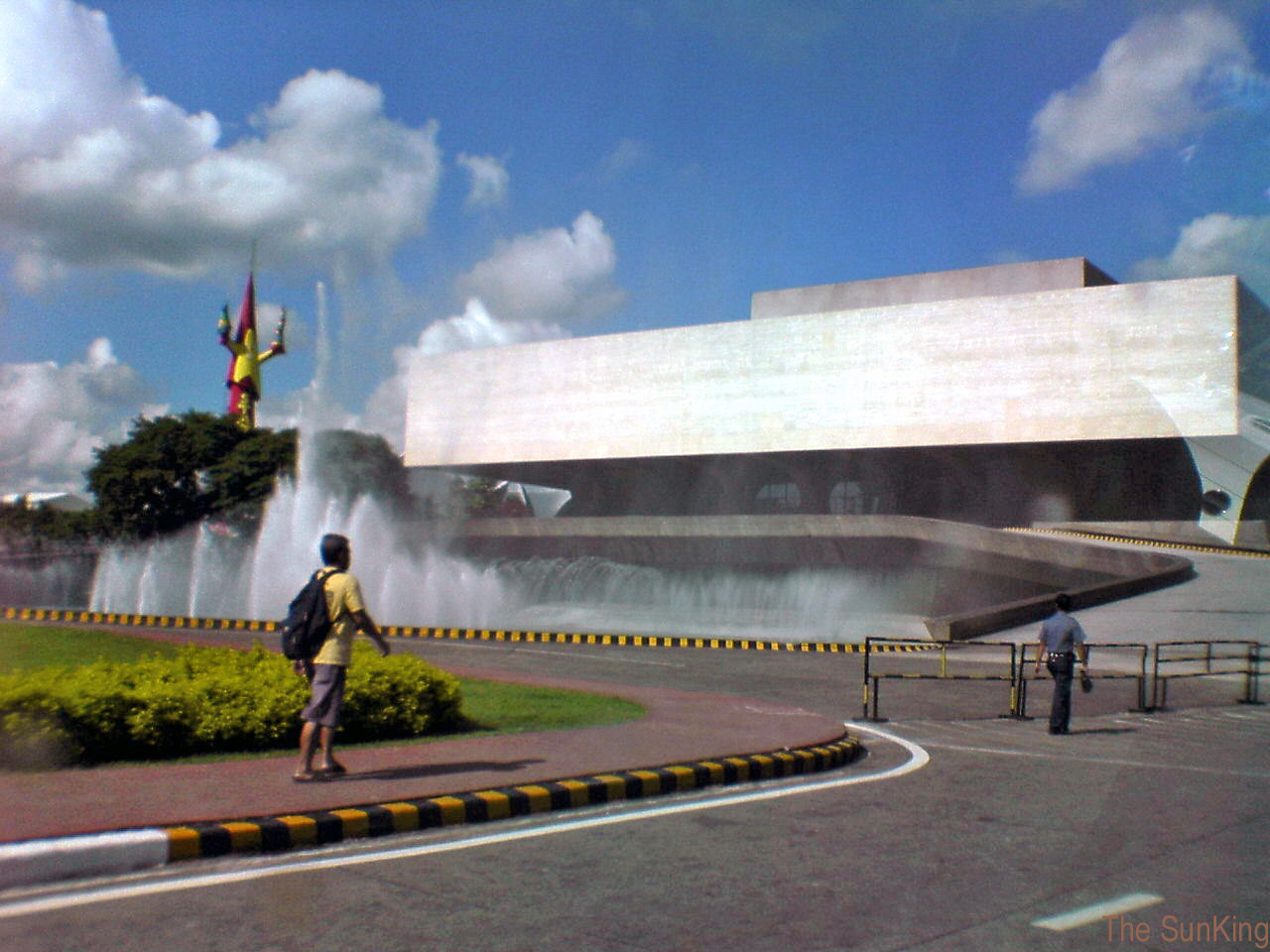
The Tanghalang Pambansa, photographed in 2005

The façade of the Tanghalang Pambansa is dominated by a two-storey travertine block suspended 12 meters (39 ft) high by deep concave cantilevers on three sides. The rest of the structure is clad in concrete, textured by crushed seashells originally found on the reclamation site. The building is built on a massive podium, and entry is through a vehicular ramp in front of the raised lobby and a pedestrian side entry on its northwest side. In front of the façade and below the ramp, there is an octagonal reflecting pool with fountains and underwater lights. In the main lobby, three large Capiz-shell chandeliers hang from the third floor ceiling, each symbolizing the three main geographical divisions of the Philippines: Luzon, Visayas and Mindanao. At the orchestra entrance, a brass sculpture, The Seven Arts by Vicente Manansala welcomes the audience into the main theater. From the pedestrian entrance, Arturo Luz's Black and White is displayed as spectators enter the little theater or ascend to the main lobby through a massive carpeted spiral staircase. Most of the interior is lit artificially, as there are few windows, most of which are located along the sides of the main lobby. Large areas on the upper floors are open to the ground floor lobby, emphasizing the large chandeliers and fluid interior spaces on the northeast side of the building. Galleries and other rooms surround these open areas, occupying the space created by the huge cantilevered block. Whenever possible, the walls surrounding these rooms are used as additional venues for displaying artworks.

Much of the criticism of the building's architecture is directed towards its vehicular ramp. Since there are usually no valet services or parking areas directly accessible from the lobby entrance, the ramp's use is ideal only for audience members who are chauffeur-driven; at the expense of pedestrians, who may enter through the side entrance or a narrow (and potentially hazardous) pathway on the ramp. In defense of the design, Andy Locsin (a partner of his father's firm) explained that the decision of raising the whole structure on the podium (and consequently, the addition of the ramp) was in response to the high sea levels on the reclaimed land, and was not intended to promote an elitist view of art and culture.

== Venues ==
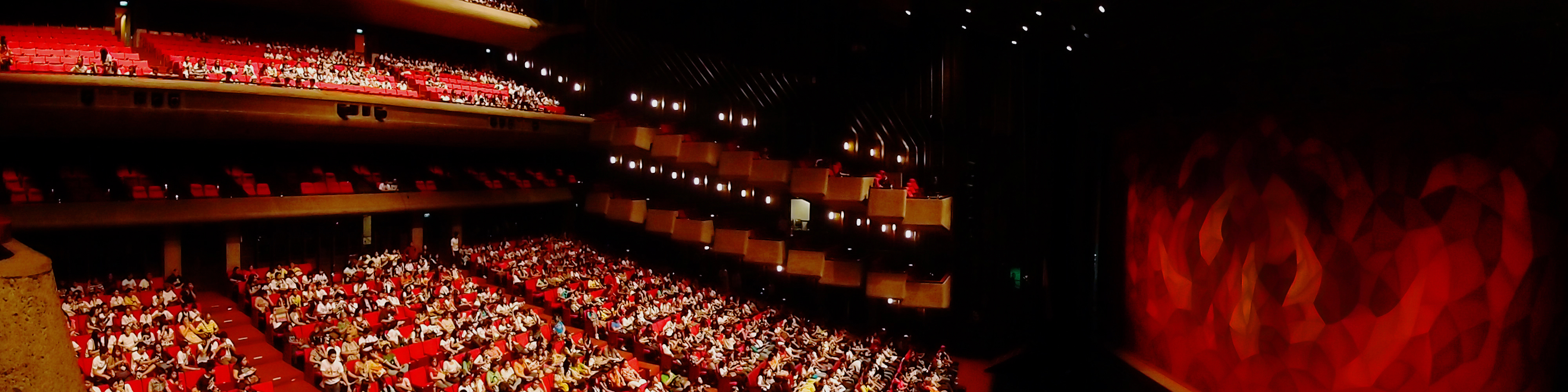
The Main Theater, named after composer Nicanor Abelardo. On the extreme right is the house curtain based on Hernando Ocampo's Genesis.

=== Tanghalang Nicanor Abelardo ===
The Tanghalang Nicanor Abelardo or the Main Theater is the largest performance venue inside the Tanghalang Pambansa. It can accommodate up to 1,815 people on four levels: orchestra, boxes, and two balconies. The stage is 25 meters (82 ft) from the main curtain line to the back wall and 38.8 meters (127 ft) from the left wall to the right. The proscenium opening has a height of 9 meters (30 ft) and width of 18 meters (59 ft). A 5.6-meter (18 ft 4 in) deep orchestra pit contains two elevators that can accommodate up to 62 musicians. The stage floor, unwaxed and painted matte-black (originally not stained), is made from a species of Philippine Mahogany. The main stage curtain is patterned after the painting Genesis, a work by National Artist Hernando Ocampo. A variable acoustics hall designed by Bolt, Beranek and Newman, the Main Theater was planned for flexibility. It was built to accommodate the sound requirements of various types of presentations, and can typically hold opera and orchestra performances without further amplification. New York Times critic Howard Taubman praised the theater's acoustical flexibility in his review of the center's opening night, writing that the architect and his team seem to have built a venue "that will be equally congenial for drama, instrumental and vocal music and dance."

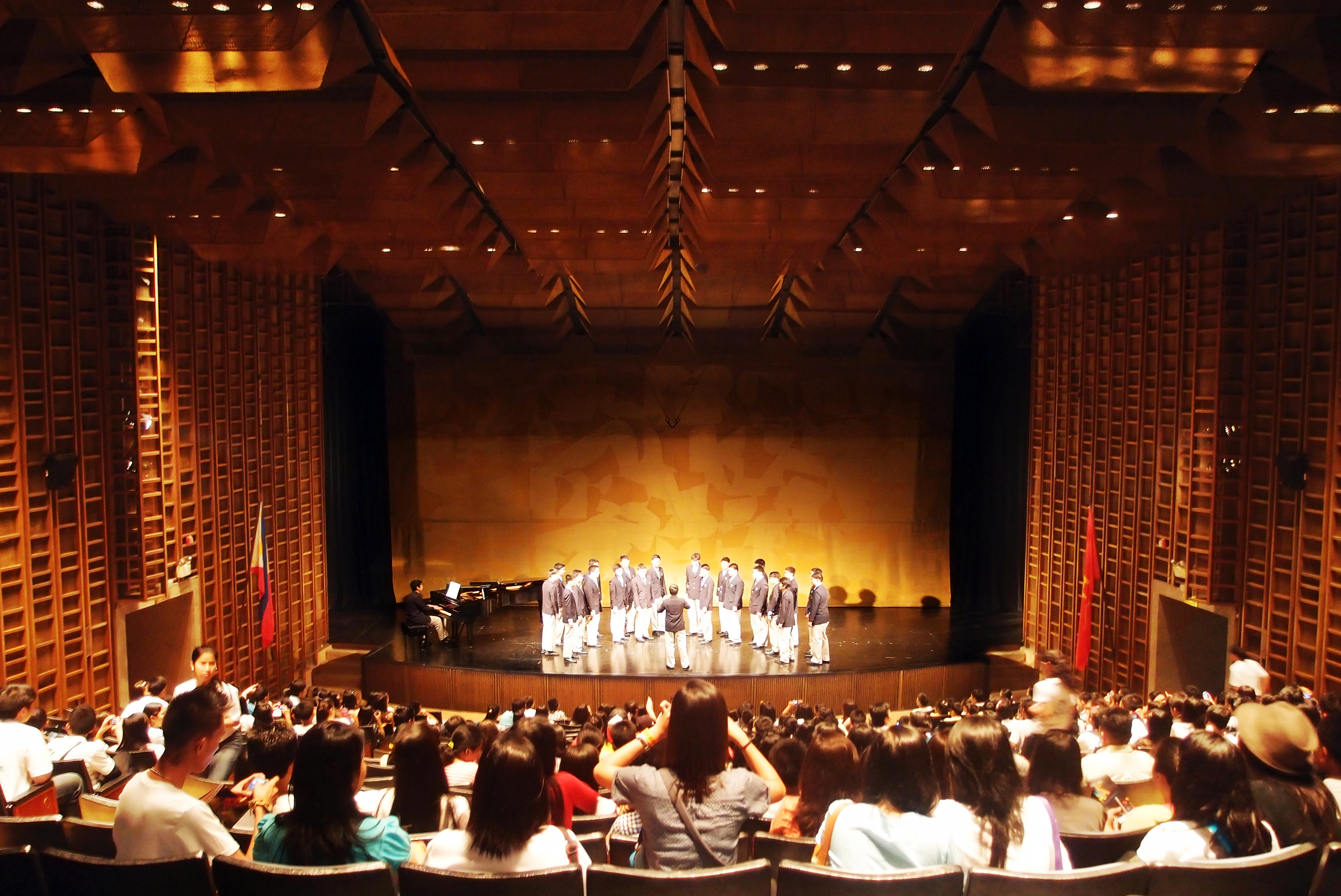
Tanghalang Aurelio Tolentino

=== Tanghalang Aurelio Tolentino ===
The Tanghalang Aurelio Tolentino or the Little Theater, inaugurated a few years after the opening of the main theater, is a conventional proscenium stage, designed for drama, chamber music, solo recitals, lectures, and film screenings. It seats 413 people in one orchestra section. From the main curtain line to the back wall, the stage measures 13.6 meters (45 ft) with a proscenium width of 13.9192 meters (45 ft 8 in) and features the same Mahogany flooring as the larger Main Theater. A covered orchestra pit that extends into the apron gives additional performance space, similar to a thrust stage. The stage curtain is a tapestry woven in Kyoto, Japan, based on a painting of Roberto Chabet, visual artist and former director of the CCP Museum. When unfolded, the curtain acts as a natural sound reverberation medium.

=== Tanghalang Huseng Batute ===
The Tanghalang Pambansa has a lone black box theater named Tanghalang Huseng Batute or the Studio Theater, after the pseudonym of Filipino poet José Corazón de Jesús. Depending on the size of the stage or acting area, it can seat up to 240 people in two levels. The 100-seat Tanghalang Manuel Conde or the Dream Theater, a joint project of the CCP and Dream Broadcasting, is used as a venue for film screenings and lectures; and has the capability to receive and show films directly through satellite.

== Exhibit halls ==
The Tanghalang Pambansa has three exhibit halls and another three hallways that can be used for displaying artwork. The largest exhibition space is the Bulwagang Juan Luna, which serves as the Main Gallery. Located on the third floor, it has a floor area of 440 square meters (4,700 sq ft). Two smaller galleries are named after Filipino painters Fernando Amorsolo and Carlos Francisco. The latter is usually used for large scale installations and is located at the lobby of the Little Theater. Hallways lining the Main Theater on the upper three storeys are also used for display and measure 2.4 meters (7 ft 10 in) high by 30.2 meters (99 ft) wide each. These spaces are named after visual artists Victorio Edades, Guillermo Tolentino and Vicente Manansala.

Established in 1988 the Museo ng Kalinangang Pilipino, also called the CCP Museum, is an integrated humanities museum that studies, collects and preserves Filipino artistic traditions. It has two permanent exhibitions: one on Filipino tradition, art and aesthetics; and the other showcasing the CCP's collection of traditional Asian musical instruments. The museum also presents special changing exhibitions, provides curatorial assistance, and organizes workshops on indigenous art forms.

== In popular culture ==
- The main theater lobby features in Eraserheads' music video for their 1997 single, "Spoliarium".
- Various venues inside the theater were featured in Itchyworms' music video for their song, "Di Na Muli". The video was shot as a tribute to lighting designer Teodoro Hilado, who served as technical director of the CCP from 1969 to 1973.
