= L. V. Locsin Building =

General information
- Status: Completed
- Type: Office
- Location: 6752 Ayala Avenue corner Makati Avenue, Makati, Philippines
- Coordinates: 14.5545°N 121.0239°E
- Named for: Leandro Locsin
- Construction started: 1982
- Completed: 1985

Height
- Height: 74.8 m (245 ft) (estimate)

Technical details
- Floor count: 19

Design and construction
- Architect: Leandro Locsin

L. V. Locsin Building is a 19-storey office building at 6752 Ayala Avenue. Named after its designer, National Artist for Architecture Leandro Locsin, and completed in 1985, it is notable for its Brutalist architectural style and the architect's signature of floating volumes. With an estimated height of 74.8 meters (245 ft), the building is the first in the Philippines to have no corner columns, evident in the corners of the building where the main emergency staircase is located, highly visible at night with the lights switched on.

== Location ==
The L. V. Locsin building is located at the southwest corner of Ayala Avenue and Makati Avenue in Makati City, Philippines. Its location makes it one of the most sought after office address in the Makati Central Business District. Highly accessible via public transportation, it is near famous landmarks in the city, including Makati Shangri-La, Manila Peninsula, Ayala Triangle, Ayala Museum, and Greenbelt.

== Amenities ==
The building is mainly used as an office space, occupants include Marubeni Philippines Corporation, Leighton Contractors, and Anchor Land Holdings. The podium also houses Sala, a fine dining restaurant.
