= Sampung Mga Daliri =

Sampung Mga Daliri, atbp.
- Orchestra: UST Symphony Orchestra
- Venue: Tanghalang Nicanor Abelardo (Main Theater) of the CCP

Concert chronology
- 2024; 2026

The Sampung Mga Daliri, atbp. (Tagalog for 'Ten Fingers, etc.') is an annual concert of the Conservatory of Music of the University of Santo Tomas Manila in the Philippines. The concert was conceptualized by Ernani Cuenco, a national artist for music in 1984. It was first held in 1990.

== Performers ==
The ensemble includes UST Symphony Orchestra, UST Percussion Ensemble, UST Guitar Ensemble.

== Editions ==
Edition	Year	Theme	Venue	Ref
26th	2010		Tanghalang Nicanor Abelardo (Main Theater) of the Cultural Center of the Philippines Complex	
27th	2011	UST Quadricentennial Celebration	Tanghalang Nicanor Abelardo	
28th	2012		Tanghalang Nicanor Abelardo	
29th	2013	Isang Pasasalamat kay Dekana Erlinda C. Fule	Tanghalang Nicanor Abelardo	
30th	2014		Tanghalang Nicanor Abelardo	
31st	2015		Tanghalang Nicanor Abelardo	
32nd	2017	Movie themes	Tanghalang Nicanor Abelardo	
33rd	2019	Laru-Laro	Tanghalang Nicanor Abelardo	
34th	2024	Pastiche Patisserie	Quadricentennial Pavilion	
35th	2026	Pagdiriwang ng Musikang Pilipino	Newport Performing Arts Theater	
