= Ayala Museum =

Art and history museum in Makati, Philippines

- Established: April 1967; 59 years ago
- Location: Insular Life Building (1967–1974); Old Ayala Museum Building (1974–2001); Old Makati Stock Exchange Building (2001–2004); Ayala Museum Building (2004–present)
- Coordinates: 14°33′12.98″N 121°1′23.41″E
- Type: Art and history museum
- Visitors: 65,000+ (2014)
- Website: ayalamuseum.org
- Building details
- Location in Metro Manila Location in Luzon Location in the Philippines

General information
- Status: December 4, 2021 (reopened)
- Location: Makati, Philippines
- Inaugurated: September 28, 2004
- Renovated: 2019–2021

Technical details
- Material: granite, steel, glass
- Floor count: 6

Design and construction
- Architect: Leandro Y. Locsin Jr.
- Architecture firm: Leandro V. Locsin Partners

Other information
- Parking: Greenbelt Basement Parking

The Ayala Museum is a museum in Makati, Metro Manila, Philippines. It is run privately by the Ayala Foundation and houses archaeological, ethnographic, historical, fine arts, numismatics, and ecclesiastical exhibits. Since its establishment in April 1967, the museum has been committed to showcasing overseas collections and situating contemporary Philippine art in the global arena in a two-way highway of mutual cooperation and exchange with local and international associates. The museum was reopened on December 4, 2021, after a two-year renovation.

== History ==
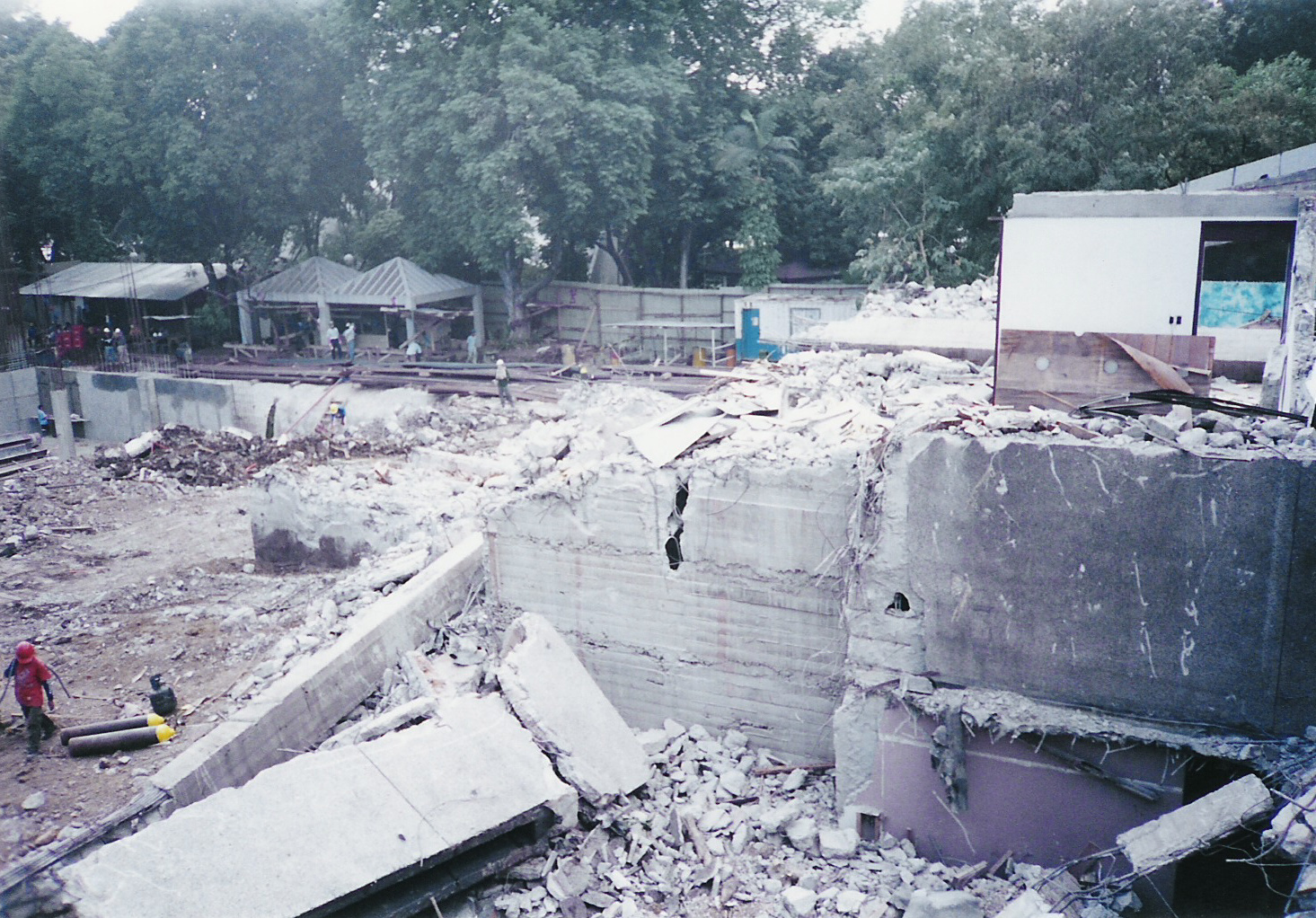
Demolition of the original Ayala Museum in 2001

Envisioned during the 1950s by Philippine abstract painter Fernando M. Zobel, as a museum of Philippine history and iconography, the Ayala Museum was established in April 1967 as a project of the Filipinas Foundation, now known as the Ayala Foundation. The museum was housed at the Insular Life Building until 1974 before being transferred to the old Makati Stock Exchange Building. The old building was designed by National Artist Leandro Locsin.

Plans to transfer to the Ayala Museum were made as early as 2002. The old building that hosted the old Ayala Museum was demolished which met some criticism from heritage conservationists. The old museum was soon replaced by Greenbelt 4, which opened in 2004 and was a part of Greenbelt's expansion project.

The museum moved to a new six-story building made from granite, steel and glass, which was designed by Leandro V. Locsin Partners, led by Leandro Y. Locsin Jr., the son of the architect that designed the old Ayala Museum. It was formally dedicated at the 170th anniversary of the Ayala Corporation on September 28, 2004, and stands on the same site of the original Ayala Museum.

The museum temporarily closed on June 1, 2019, for renovations, which were expected to finish by the end of 2020. These renovations were halted due to the COVID-19 pandemic, but subsequently finished by November 2021. The museum reopened on December 4, 2021.

== Permanent exhibitions ==
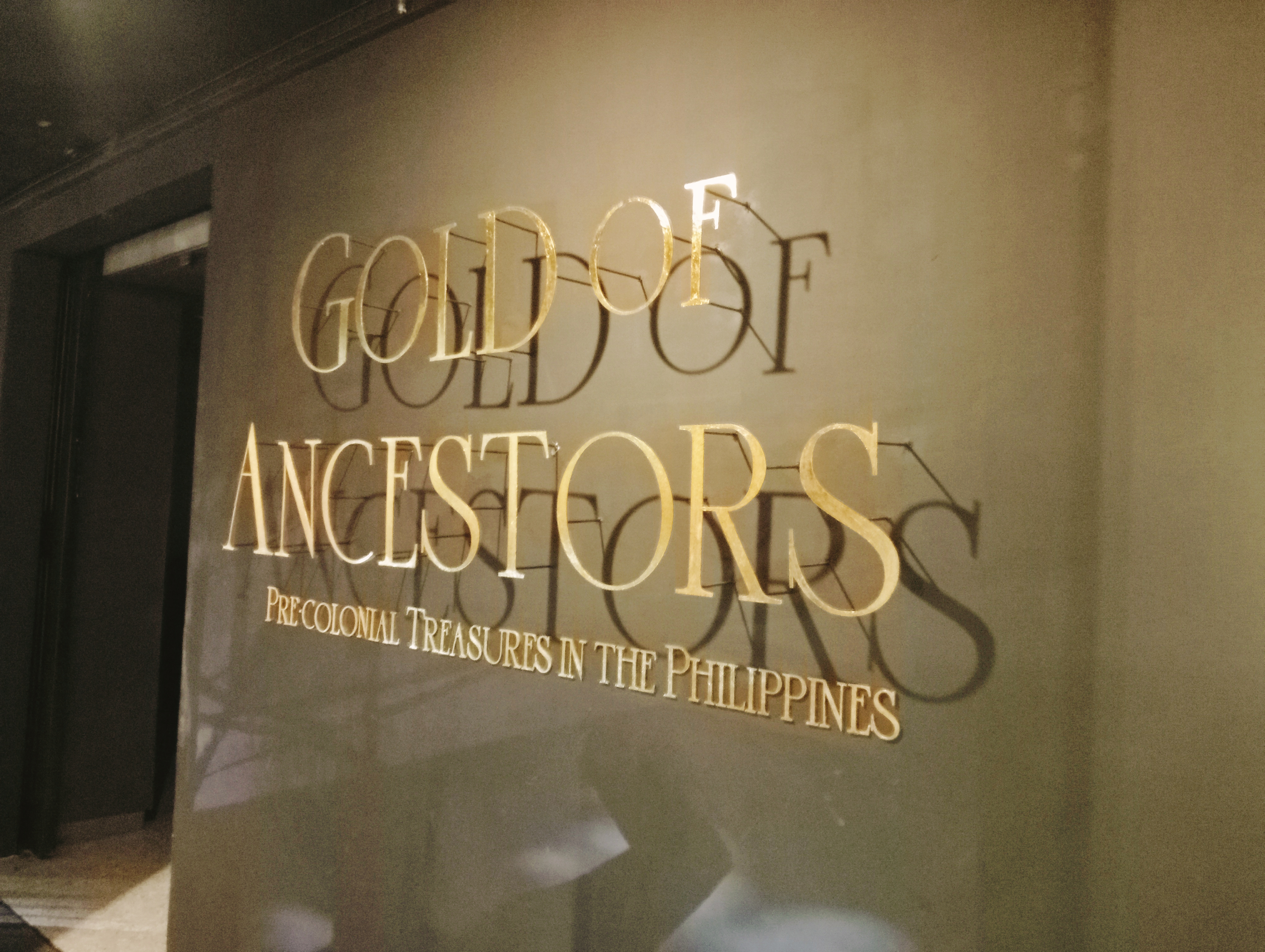
Gold of Ancestors

- Ayala Museum: In Microcosm – A display of works from the various art holdings of its permanent collection and from its existing long-term loan agreements designed to give an overview of the cultural heritage of the Philippines.
- The Digital Gallery – A space for visitors to virtually explore artworks, artifacts, and music up close from the various holdings of the museum and collections of the Filipinas Heritage Library through an interactive.
- The Diorama Experience — Sixty handcrafted dioramas form the core of Ayala Museum's historical collections and chronicle Philippine history. The exhibition highlights major events and themes from prehistoric times to the recognition of Philippine independence by the United States in 1946. The exhibition culminates with People Power, a multimedia presentation that chronicles the events that led to the First EDSA People Power Revolution in 1986.
- Gold of Ancestors — An exhibition of more than 1,000 gold objects from cultures that existed in the Philippines before colonization in the 16th century. Many of these artifacts were adornments of elite individuals and their deities that include an array of golden sashes, necklaces, earrings and finger rings, bracelets, and anklets.
- A Millennium of Contact — A display of more than 500 Chinese and Southeast Asian ceramics found in the Philippines, telling the story of how the country forged social and commercial ties with China and its neighbors.

== Changing exhibitions ==
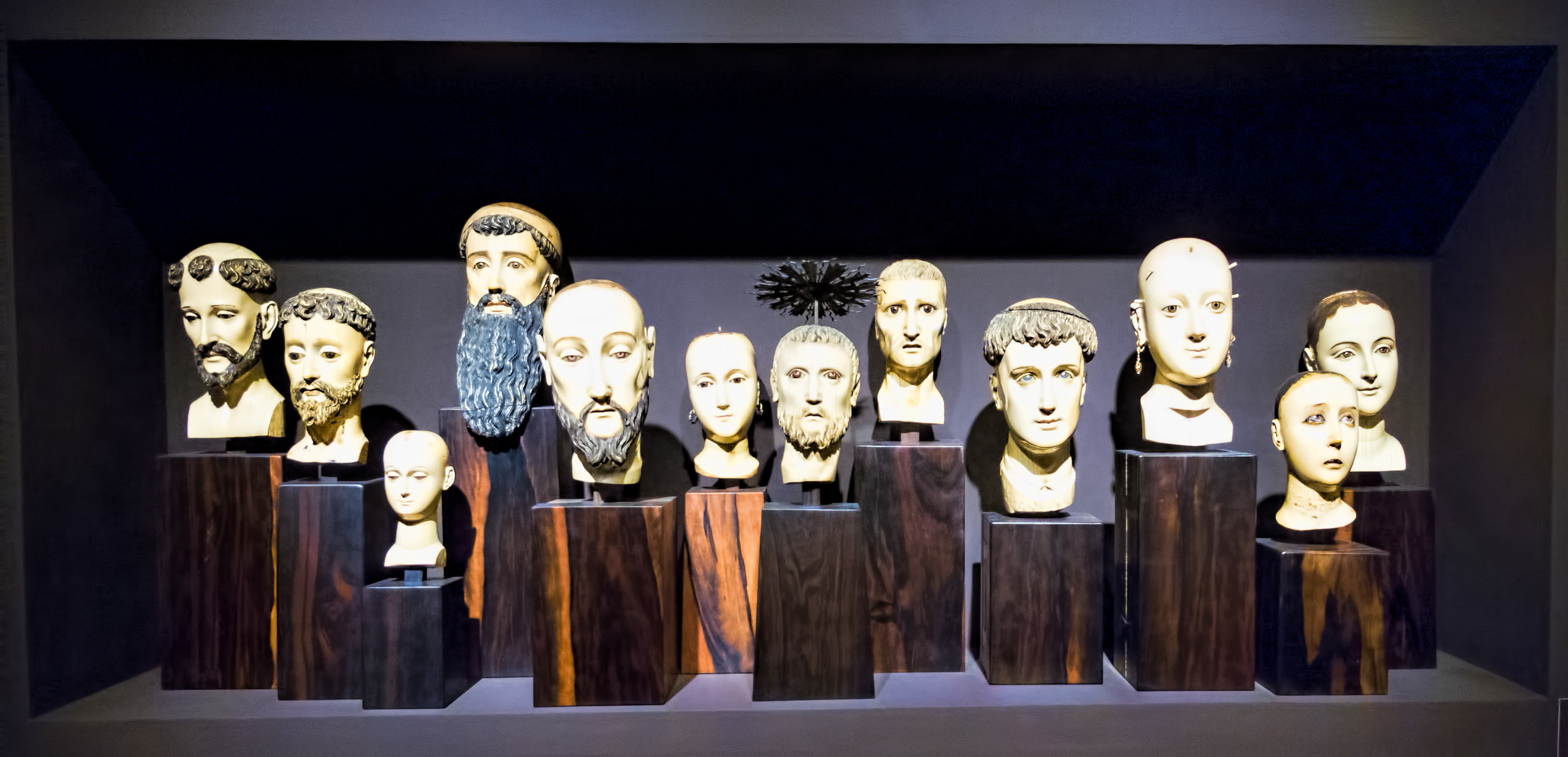
Head sculptures of saints dating back to the 17th and 18th centuries

=== Ground Floor Gallery ===
Contemporary exhibitions such as retrospectives of Filipino artists and contemporary international art are housed at the ground floor of the museum.

Recent exhibition features the "Beyond Tobacco" exhibit which is in time with Ayala Corporation's 180th anniversary. Beyond Tobacco presents the rich economic history of the Philippines and its deep relationship with Spain during and after the Tobacco Monopoly in the 19th century by its large collection of artifacts, memorabilia, maps, and photographs of the Compañia General de Tobacos de Filipinas (also known as Tabacalera). Artifacts such as tobaccos, cigar holders, and other paraphernalia are shown in the exhibit. Maps of huge tobacco plantations chiefly in Luzon are also displayed, including photos of the factory before and after being bombed during the Japanese occupation. Furthermore, paintings by Fernando Amorsolo and books written by Jaime Gil de Biedma and other biographers are on display. The exhibit was curated by Professor Martin Rodrigo of the Universitat Pompeu Fabra (also known as Pompeu Fabra University) in Barcelona, Spain.

=== Second Floor Gallery ===
The museum's second floor gallery features art exhibits and galleries. Accessible through Greenbelt, it offers free admission, distinct from the rest of the museum.

=== Third Floor Gallery ===
The museum's third floor galleries and the Zobel multipurpose hall are designed to house the changing displays showing Pioneers of Philippine Art, Images of Nation, New Frontiers, and Collector Series- from the 18th century to the contemporary period of Philippine art.

Pioneers of Philippine Art showcases the 100 years of Philippine art from the late 19th century to the 20th century in the works of three famous Filipino artists namely Juan Luna, Fernando Amorsolo and Fernando M. Zobel. Paintings of Amorsolo includes Palay Maiden (1920), Maiden with Lanzones (1924), Maiden in a Flower Garden (1948), Portrait of Victoria Zobel de Ayala (1948), and Open Market Scene (1957–1958) to name a few. All works of Zobel highlights pure non-objectivism and abstract art. Some of these include Vasata (1960), Portrait of Ep (1961), El Balcon II (1964), Pausa Clara (1966), and Las Soledades de Lope de Vega (1968).

Images of Nation shows the works of the national artists for visual arts of the Philippines while, New Frontiers features the work of contemporary artists. Launched in 2010. In the past years, Images of Nation has featured a collection of works by Vicente Manansala (May–July 2010), Jose Joya (September 2011-January 2012), and Victorio Edades (March July 2012).

The Collector Series presents selections from private collections of art in curated thematic exhibitions.

== Gallery ==
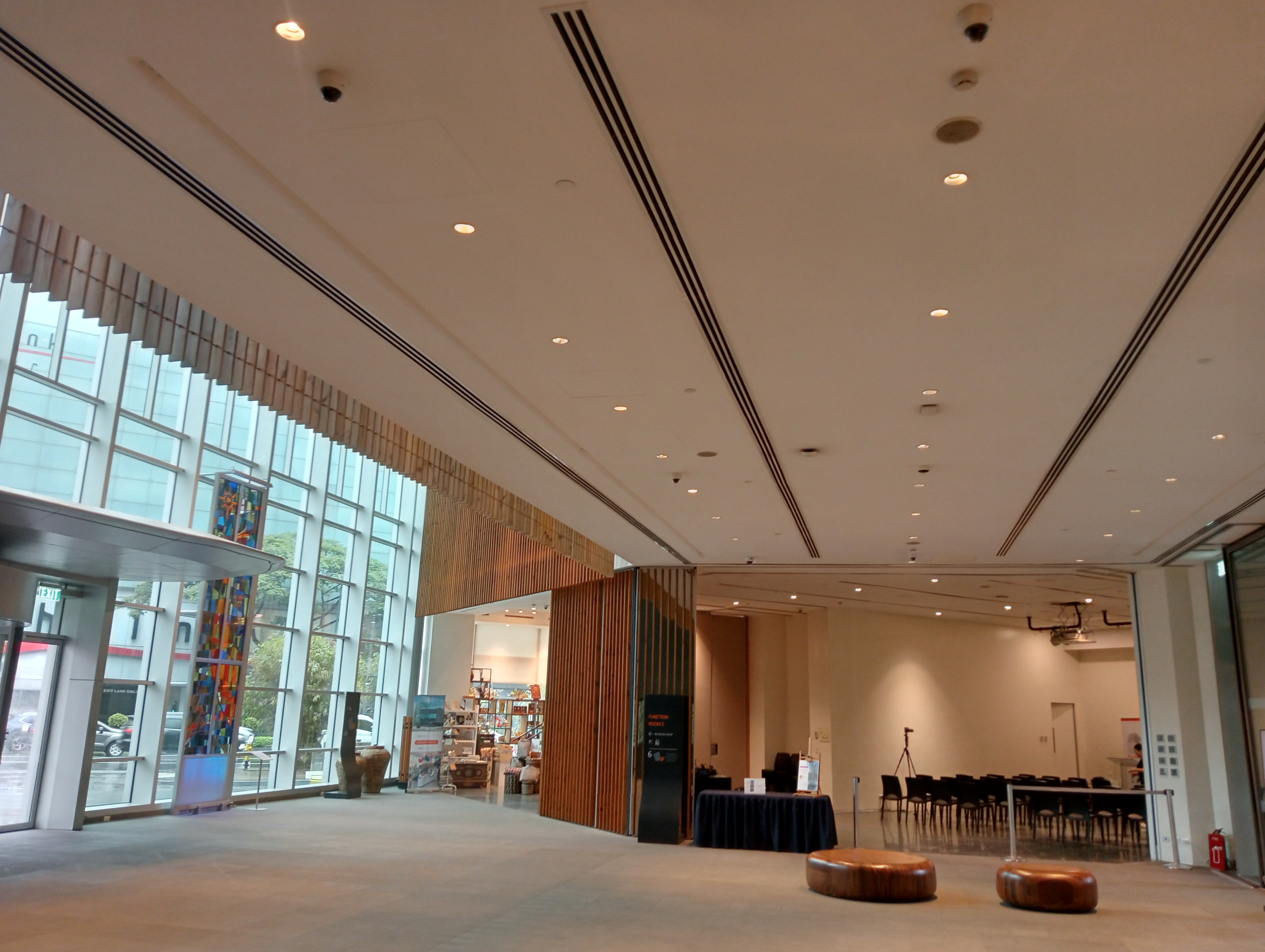
Lobby

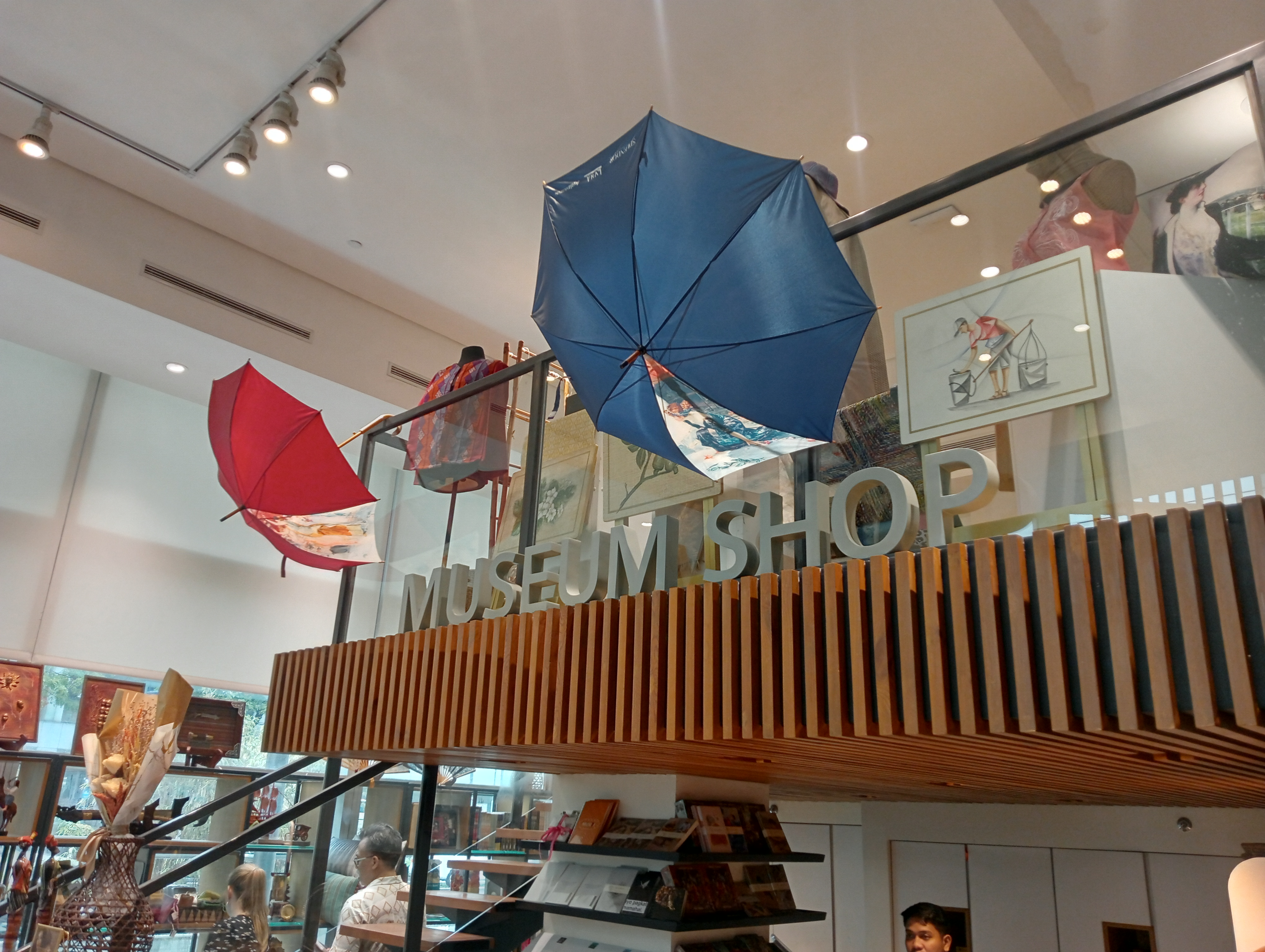
Museum Shop

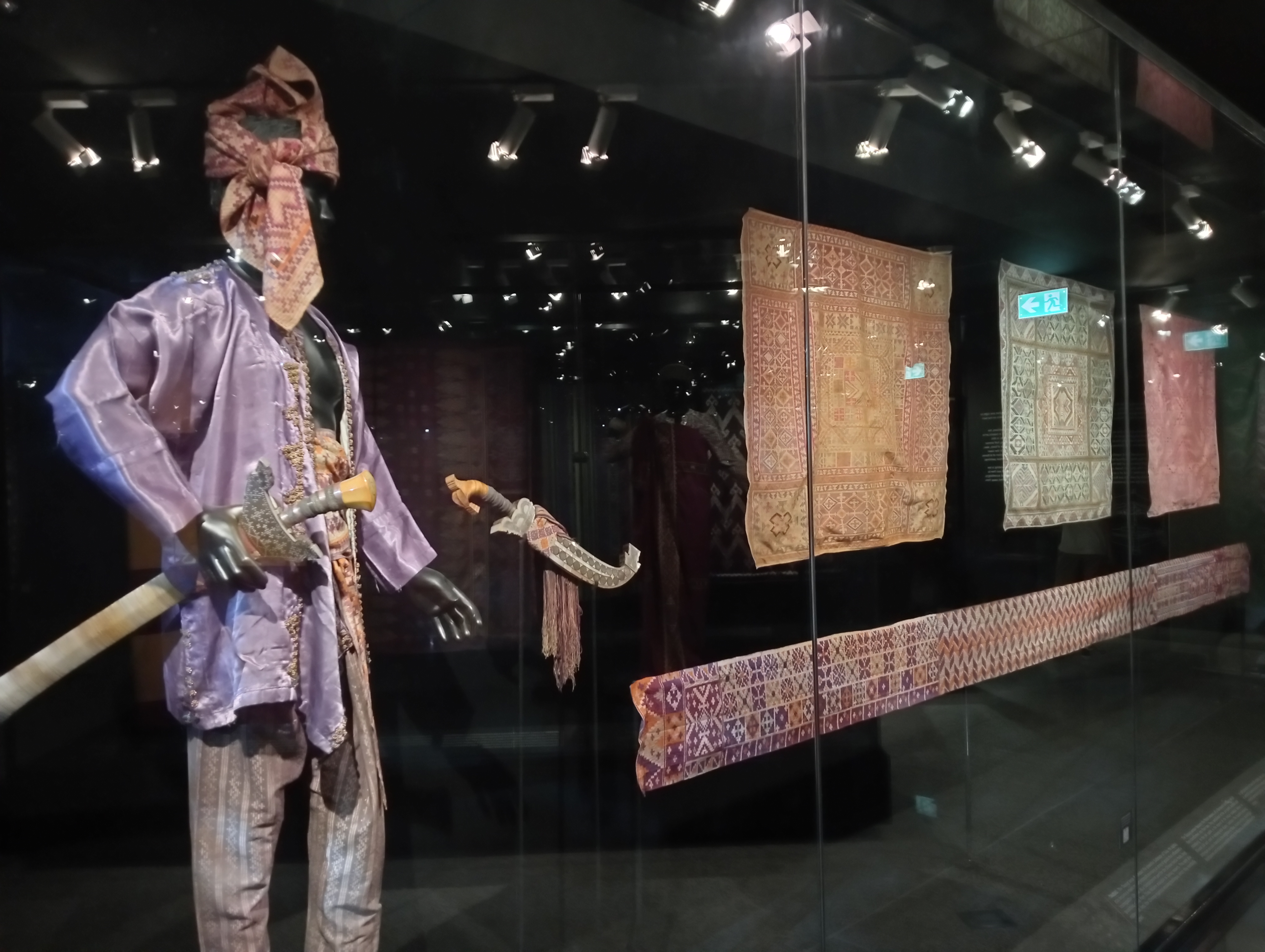
Tausug Textile

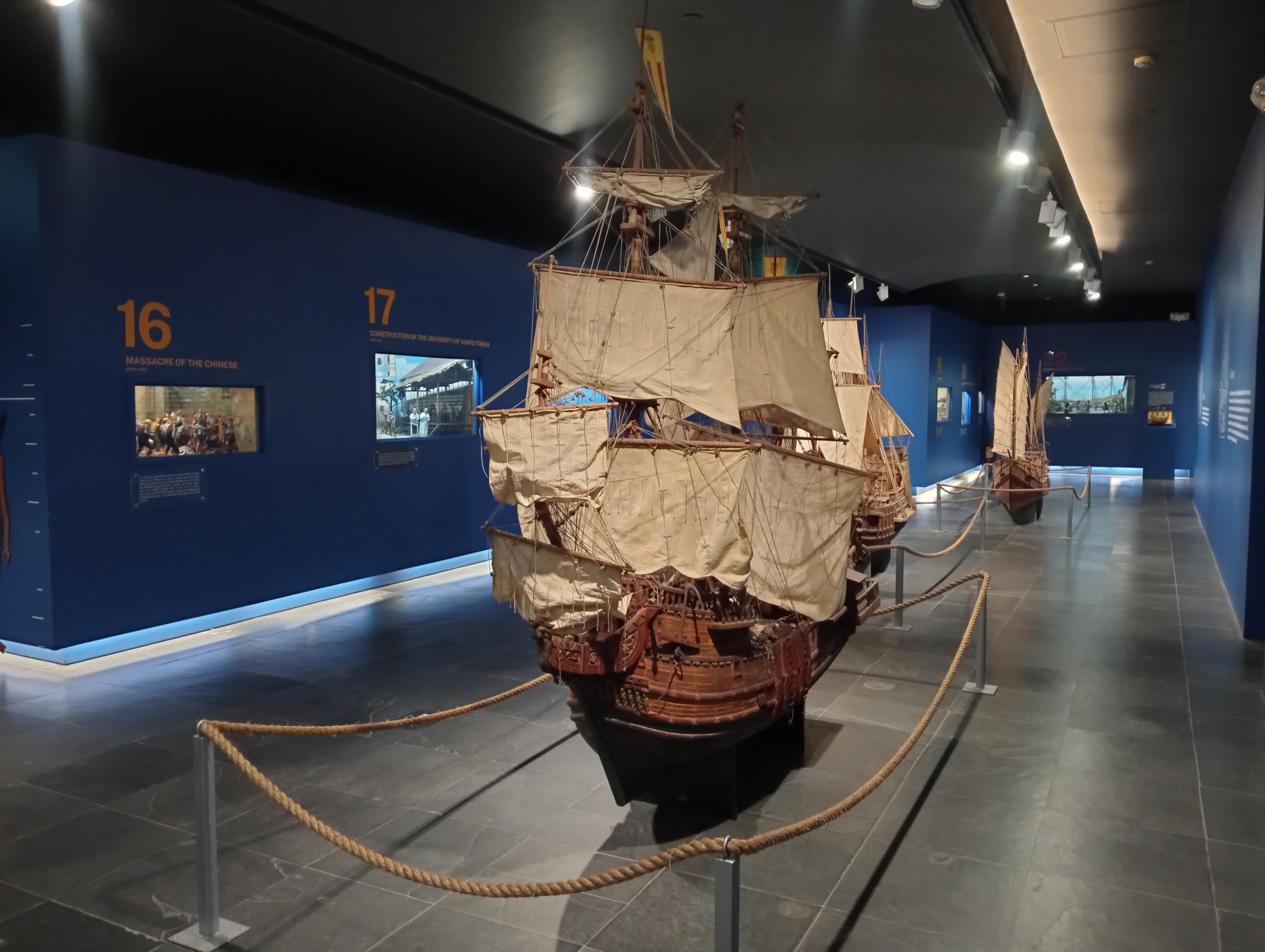
Spanish Galleon

== Educational centers ==
=== Filipinas Heritage Library ===
Filipinas Heritage Library
- Location: Ayala Museum, Philippines
- Scope: Filipiniana

Collection
- Size: 13,000+ contemporary volumes 2,000+ rare titles, rare books on microfiche, maps 35,000+ photographs 12,000 monographs 400 audio and video materials 1,000 phonograph records

Other information
- Website: filipinaslibrary.org.ph

The Filipinas Heritage Library is located on the sixth floor of the museum. It is known to be one of the electronic research centers in the Philippines. It houses more than 13,000 contemporary volumes on Philippine history, art, language, religion, and the social sciences, and more than 2,000 uncommon titles, maps, and photographs. Additional features of this library include the digitization of its collection, CD-ROM publishing, development of web pages, and electronic databases. The library has set up an online search engine that provides access to more than 357,000 Filipiniana database records, through its numerous Library Link initiatives in the past, from over a hundred partner libraries across the Philippines.

=== Ceramics Study Center ===
Aside from the pieces of tradeware vessels from the Roberto T. Villanueva collection, one section of the museum provides researchers with study collections including books and several publications on art and history of ceramics courtesy of John D. Forbes.

== See also ==
- Culture of the Philippines
- Cultural Center of the Philippines
- National Museum of the Philippines

== Bibliography ==
- Lenzi, Iola (2004). Museums of Southeast Asia. Singapore: Archipelago Press. p. 200 pages. ISBN 981-4068-96-9.
