= Midas Hotel and Casino =

Casino hotel in Pasay, Philippines

- Former names: Hyatt Regency Manila

General information
- Location: Pasay, Philippines
- Coordinates: 14°32′23.3″N 120°59′34.9″E
- Construction started: 1965
- Completed: 1968

Design and construction
- Architect: Leandro Locsin

Other information
- Number of rooms: 227

The Midas Hotel and Casino is a casino hotel in Pasay, Metro Manila, Philippines.

== History ==
The Midas Hotel and Casino opened in 1968 and was owned by the López family. On February 1, 1971, the hotel became part of the Hyatt Hotel chain; the second Hyatt establishment outside the United States. It was owned by singer-songwriter Jose Mari Chan.

The hotel was acquired by the Sunwest Group headed by Zaldy Co and adopted its current name. The rebranded hotel had a soft opening on December 29, 2010.

Half the hotel's stake was sold to Lucio Co, the owner of Puregold sometime in 2011. In 2012, Zaldy Co's Eco Leisure and Hospitality Holding Co. with the Leisure and Resorts World Corp. (LRWC) collaborated to acquire the shares back from Lucio Co after the partnership did not work out as intended.

The LRWC divested its 51 percent shares in 2019 with Eco Leisure offering to purchase it by exercising right of first refusal. This led to a legal dispute since 2020 between LRWC (now DigiPlus) and Eco Leisure.

== Architecture and design ==
The hotel building was designed by National Artist for Architecture Leandro Locsin. It is of Modernist architecture with Filipino characteristics.
