= Ang Kiukok =

Filipino artist (1931–2005)

- Born: Ang Kiukok; March 1, 1931; Davao City, Davao Province, Philippine Islands
- Died: May 9, 2005 (aged 74); Quezon City, Philippines
- Education: University of Santo Tomas
- Known for: Painting
- Movement: Cubism; Surrealism; Expressionism
- Awards: Order of National Artists of the Philippines

Chinese name
- Traditional Chinese: 洪救國
- Simplified Chinese: 洪救国
Transcriptions
Standard Mandarin
- Hanyu Pinyin: Hóng Jiùguó
Southern Min
- Hokkien POJ: Âng Kiù-kok

Ang Kiukok (March 1, 1931 – May 9, 2005) was a Filipino painter of Chinese descent and was a National Artist for Visual Arts.

== Early life and training ==
Ang was born on March 1, 1931, in Davao, Davao Province, Philippines to Vicente Ang and Chin Lim who were immigrants from Xiamen, China. Ang was the only son in his family and he had four sisters. He was originally intended to be named Ang Hua Shing ("Hua Shing" literally means "Chinese-born") but did not push through with the plan upon learning that his cousin was given the name by his uncle.

Ang was taught by a commercial artist at a young age on how to make charcoal portrait. His influence at the time was the artworks of Qi Baishi. After World War II, the family moved to Cotabato and Ang made movie billboards.

== Education ==
Ang attended a Chinese high school where he learned Chinese calligraphy. He moved to Manila and attended the University of Santo Tomas where one of his mentors was Vicente Manansala. He studied in the university from 1952 to 1954. He was forced to stop his studies due to financial constraints.

== Career ==
Ang's first formal recognition in his career as an artist was when his work Calesa garnered third place at the Shell National Students Art Competition in 1953. In 1954, he launched his first one-man show at the Contemporary Arts Gallery after he was urged by his mentor Manansala. Within a few years his works such as garnered him more recognition such as Still Life (1951, Honorable mention), The Bird (1959, First Prize), Still Life in Red (1963, Third Prize), Fish (1963, Second Prize) and Geometric Still-Life Fish (1963, Second Prize). All of these recognition was from the Art Association of the Philippines.

He first attained prominence in the Philippine arts scene in the 1960s with a distinct style that fused influences from cubism, surrealism and expressionism. Some classified his style as "figurative expressionism". What could not be doubted was the violence in his imagery, a factor that slighted the commercial viability of his works until the 1980s. He favored such subjects as fighting cocks, rabid dogs, and people enraptured by rage or bound in chains. As someone who has a Catholic background, he painted multiple depictions of the crucified Christ that did not shirk from portraying the agonies normally associated with the crucifixion. When asked why he was so angry, he replied, "Why not? Open your eyes. Look around you. So much anger, sorrow, ugliness. And also madness." The intensity of his works stood in contrast to his own personality, described as "placid and affable". It did not escape attention that many of Ang's most violent or gruesome imagery was painted during the martial law rule of Ferdinand Marcos, though he did not build a reputation for himself as a prominent critic of the Marcos regime.

Ang was conferred the honor of being a National Artist for Visual Arts in 2001, by virtue of Presidential Proclamation No. 32, s. 2001, which was signed on April 20, 2001. The ceremonial conferment of the honor to Ang and three other artists - F. Sionil Jose (literature), Ishmael Bernal (film) and Severino Montano (theater arts) - was held on June 11, 2001.

== Legacy and death ==
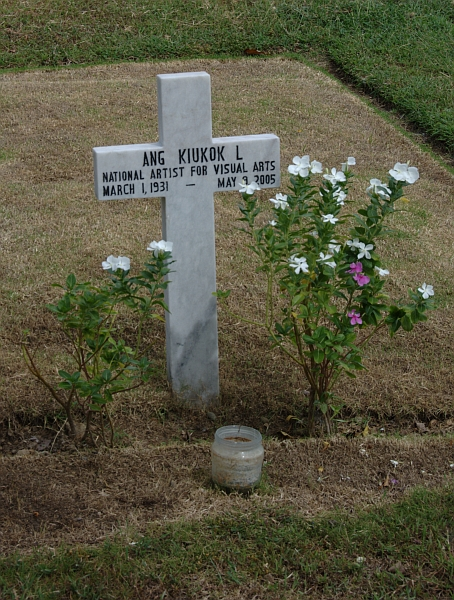
The grave of Ang Kiukok at the Libingan ng mga Bayani.

In the end, Ang emerged not only as a critical favorite, but a commercially popular artist as well. Upon his death from cancer on May 9, 2005, it was reported that he and fellow National Artist Fernando Amorsolo were the most widely bidded after Filipino painters in auctions.

Ang's 1979 mural "Men at Work" is declared in 2021 as an Important Cultural Property by the National Commission for Culture and the Arts. It is currently displayed in the National Museum of the Philippines. This white and black semiabstract mural depicts muscular humans engaging in physical work, representing the strength of the labor force.
