= Arturo Luz =

Filipino artist (1926–2021)

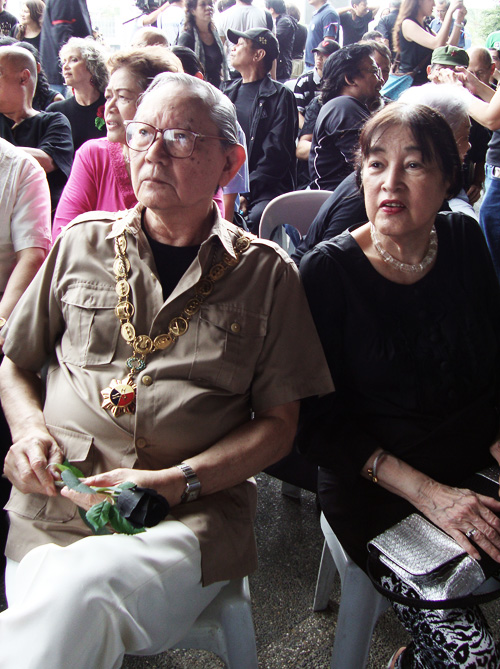
- Luz (left) at a National Artist award protest on August 7, 2009
- Born: Arturo Rogerio Dimayuga Luz; November 20, 1926; Philippines
- Died: May 26, 2021 (aged 94); Philippines
- Resting place: Libingan ng mga Bayani, Taguig
- Occupations: Artist, Art administrator
- Spouse: Teresita Ojeda (m. 1962; died 2019)
- Children: 4
- Awards: Order of National Artists of the Philippines

Ochre III by Arturo Luz, acrylic on paper, 23 inches x 36 inches, 1981. In the Art Collection Samito Jalbuena

Arturo Rogerio Dimayuga Luz (November 20, 1926 – May 26, 2021) was a Filipino visual artist. He was also a known printmaker, sculptor, designer and art administrator.

A founding member of the modern Neo-realist school in Philippine art, he received the Philippine National Artist Award, the country's highest accolade in the arts, in 1997.

== Education ==
Luz attended the School of Fine Arts at the University of Santo Tomas in Manila. He also went abroad to study at the California College of Arts and Crafts in Oakland from 1947 to 1949, the Brooklyn Museum Art School in New York from 1949 to 1950, and the Académie de la Grande Chaumiere in Paris from 1950 to 1951.

== Early career ==
While Luz was pursuing college, he began exhibiting his works. At the 1962 International Art Salon in Saigon, South Vietnam, Luz won first prize for his work. He also garnered an award from the California Art Association, and was a recipient of the Republic Cultural Heritage Award for Painting of the Philippine Republic in 1966. He was also recognized as the Outstanding Young Man In Art by The Manila Times.

== Later career ==
Luz produced art pieces through a disciplined economy of means. His early drawings were described as "playful linear works" influenced by Paul Klee. His best masterpieces were minimalist, geometric abstracts, alluding to the modernist "virtues" of competence, order and elegance; and had been further described as evoking universal reality and mirrors an aspiration for an acme of true Asian modernity.

From 1976 to 1986, Luz served as the first director of the Metropolitan Museum of Manila and is a frequent participant of exhibits held at the museum. He owned the Luz Gallery, which according to the National Commission for Culture and the Arts "professionalized the art gallery as an institution".

== Personal life ==
Arturo was married to Teresita Ojeda (February 16, 1930 – April 28, 2019), with whom he had 4 daughters, including singer Paola Luz (February 11, 1964, – August 26, 1991) and former actress and model Angela Luz. He has a granddaughter named Paulina Sotto, the daughter of Angela Luz, who would also become a visual artist.

== Death ==
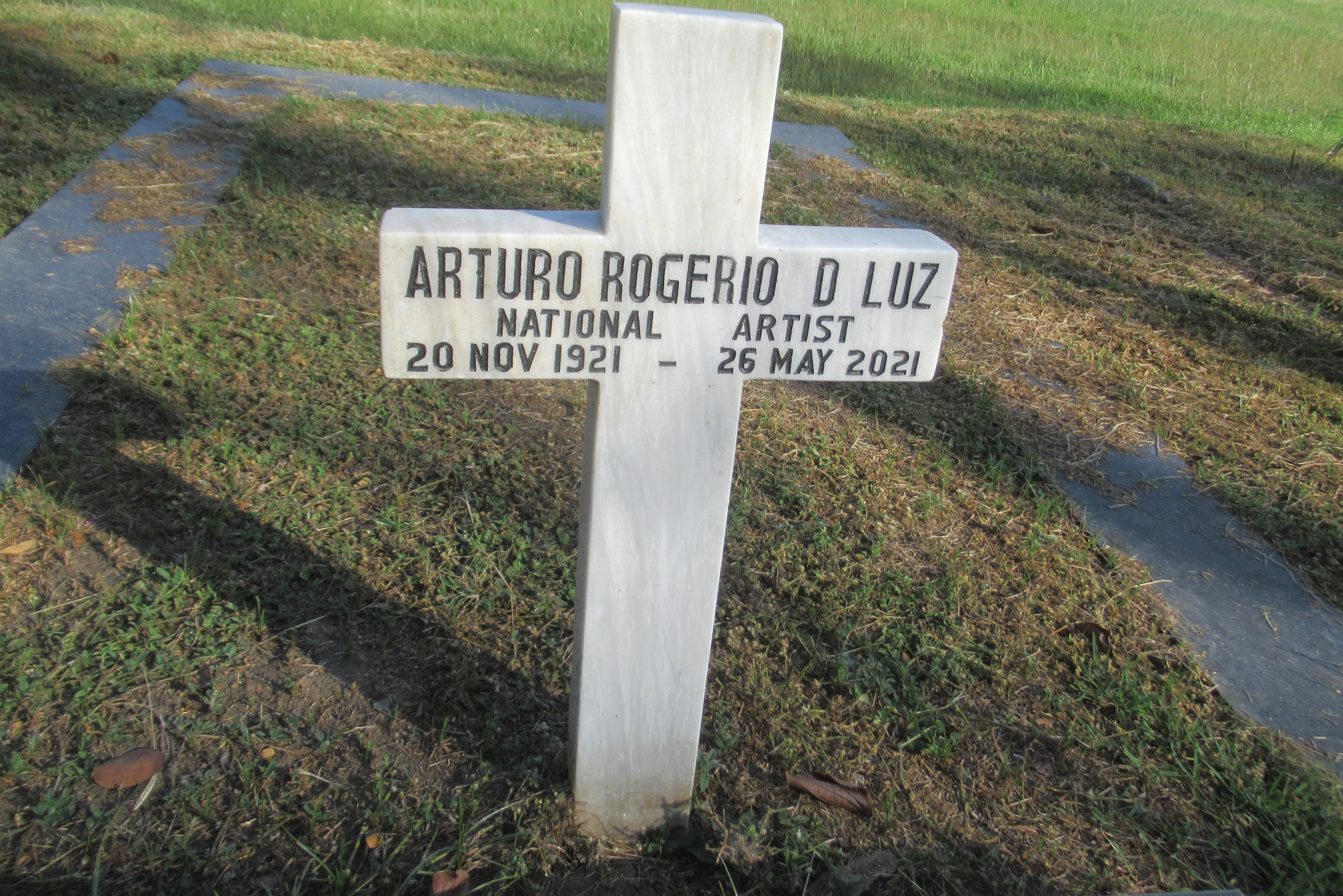
Luz's grave at Libingan ng mga Bayani

He died on May 26, 2021, at the age of 94.

== See also ==
- Arts of the Philippines
