= Vicente Manansala =

Filipino painter (1910–1981)

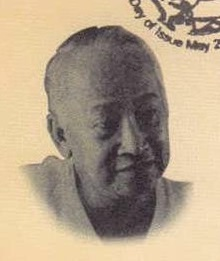
- Manansala depicted in a 2010 stampsheet
- Born: Vicente Silva Manansala; January 22, 1910; Macabebe, Pampanga, Philippine Islands
- Died: August 22, 1981 (aged 71); Makati, Philippines
- Resting place: Loyola Memorial Park, Marikina
- Known for: painter and illustrator
- Movement: Cubism
- Awards: Order of National Artists of the Philippines

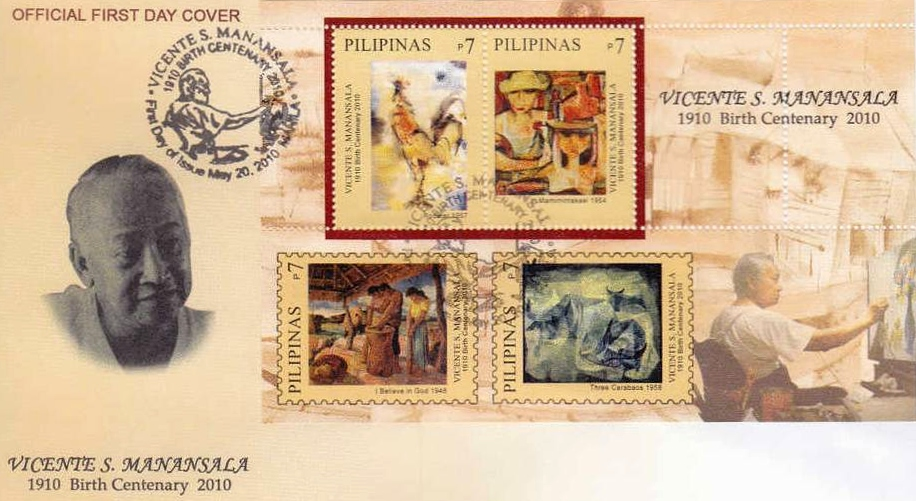
Manansala and his works on a 2010 stamp sheet of the Philippines

Vicente Silva Manansala (January 22, 1910 – August 22, 1981) was a Filipino cubist painter and illustrator. One of the first Abstractionists on the Philippine art scene, Manansala is also credited with bridging the gap between the city and the suburbs, between the rural and cosmopolitan ways of life. His paintings depict a nation in transition, an allusion to the new culture brought by the Americans. Manansala, together with Fabian de la Rosa, are among the best-selling Philippine artists in the West.

He was a member of the prominent Cruz, Manansala, and Lopez family clans. He is considered one of the 13 Moderns, a group of modernists associated with Victorio Edades.

== Early life ==
Manansala was born on January 22, 1910, in San Roque, Macabebe, Pampanga, to Perfecto Manansala and Engracia Silva. He spent his childhood in Intramuros, Manila. From 1926 to 1930, he studied at the University of the Philippines School of Fine Arts. In 1949, Manansala received a six-month grant from UNESCO to study at the École des Beaux-Arts in Banff and Montreal, Canada. In 1950, he received a nine-month scholarship to study at the École des Beaux-Arts in Paris by the French government. He also trained at the Otis School of Drawing.

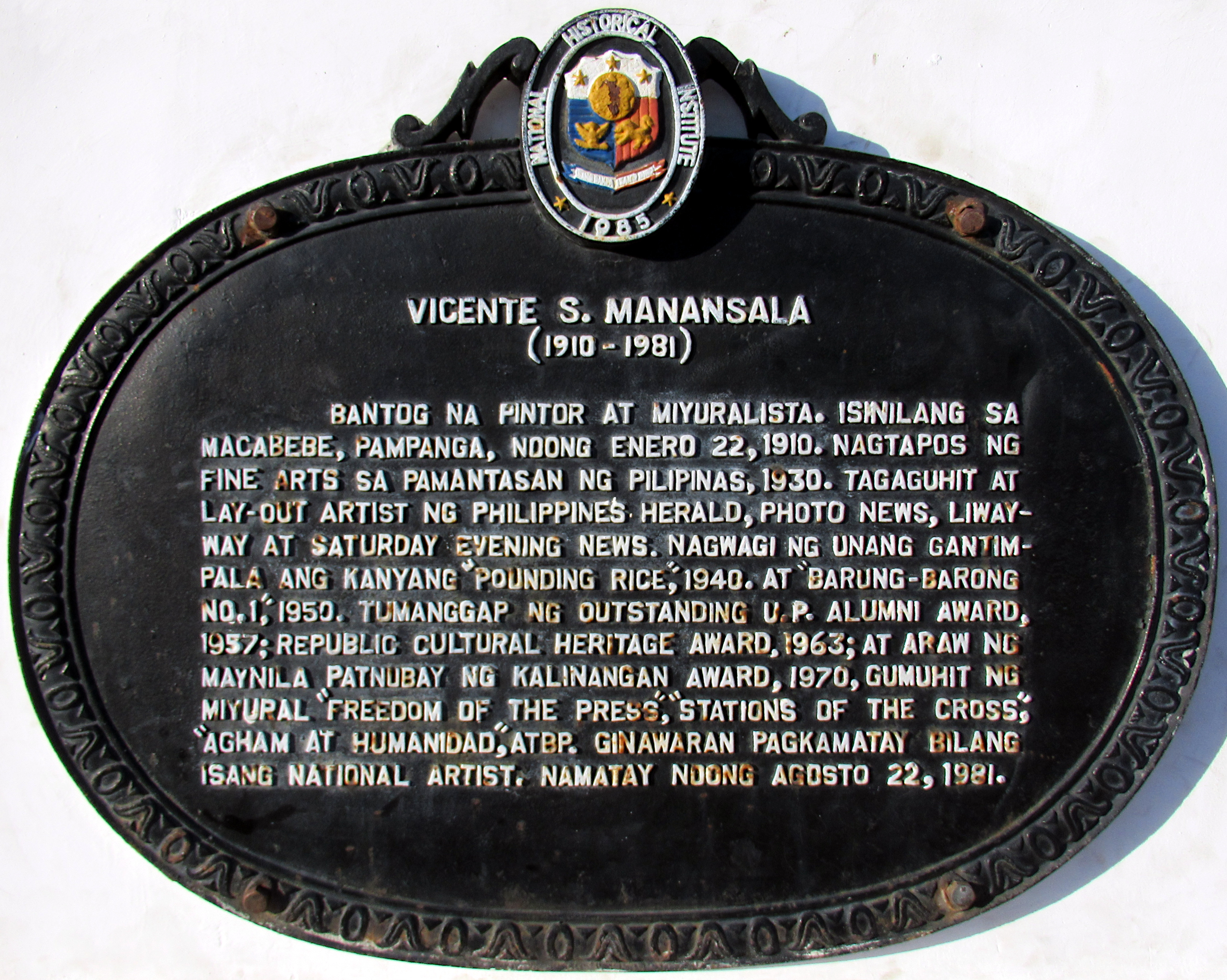
Marker (Macabebe, Pampanga Town hall.

== Later painting career ==
Manansala's paintings are the best and were celebrated as the best of the barrio and the city together. His Madonna of the Slums is a portrayal of a mother and child from the countryside who became urban shanty residents once in the city. In his Jeepneys, Manansala combined the elements of provincial folk culture with the congestion issues of the city.

Manansala developed transparent cubism, wherein the "delicate tones, shapes, and patterns of figure and environment are masterfully superimposed". A fine example of Manansala using this "transparent and translucent" technique is his composition, kalabaw (Carabao).

== Personal life and death ==
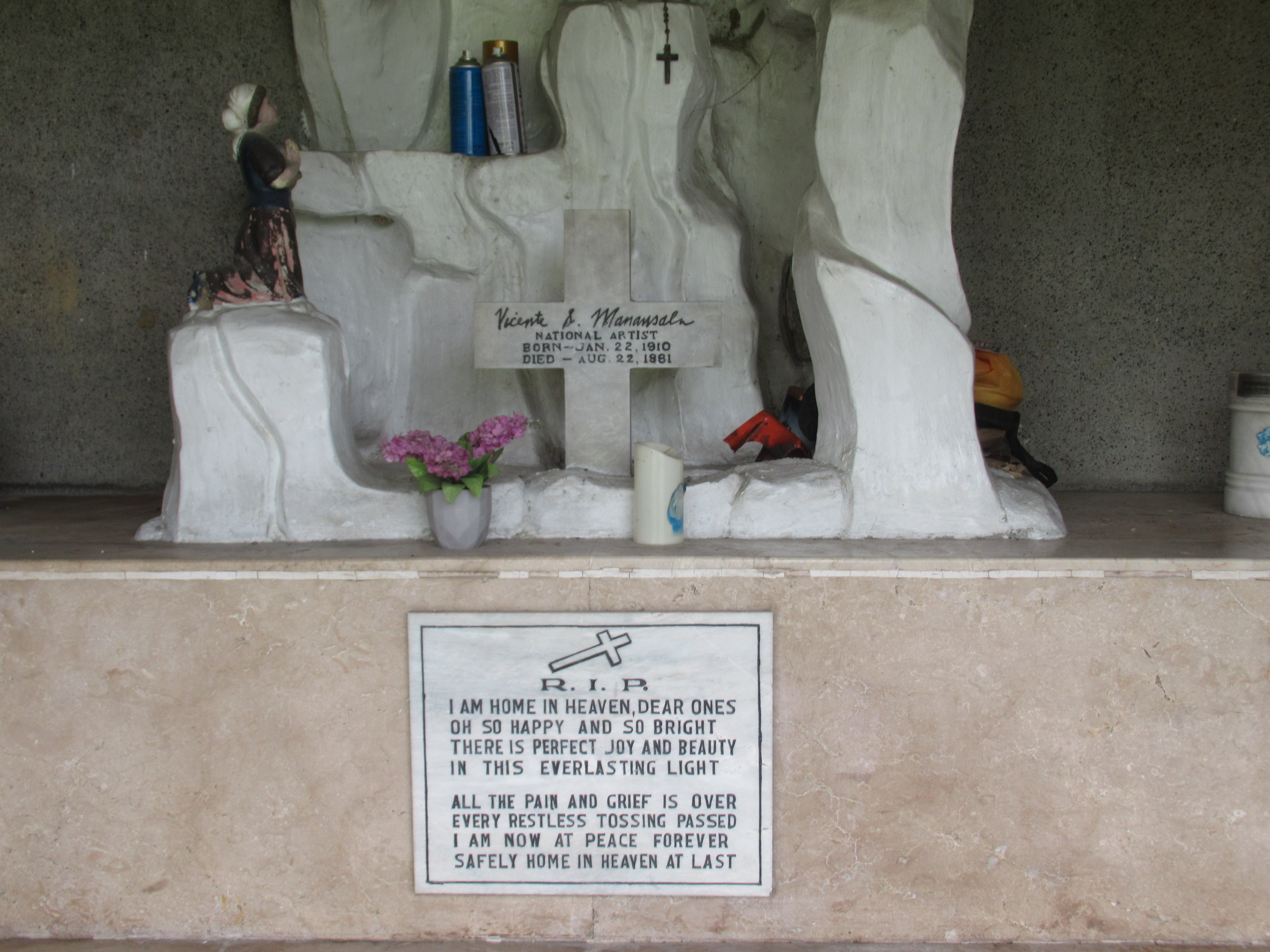
Grave of Vicente Manansala in Loyola Memorial Park, Marikina

Manansala married Hermenegilda Diaz in 1937 after a seven-year courtship that involved the couple eloping. They had one child.

In his later years, Manansala lived in Binangonan, Rizal, where he also had his studio. He died on August 22, 1981, in Makati, Philippines, due to lung cancer. He was posthumously declared a National Artist of the Philippines for Painting five days later.

== Legacy ==
Manansala, a National Artist of the Philippines in Visual Arts, was a direct influence to his fellow Filipino neo-realists: Malang, Angelito Antonio, Norma Belleza and Manuel Baldemor. The Honolulu Museum of Art, the Lopez Memorial Museum (Manila), the Philippine Center (New York City), the Singapore Art Museum and Holy Angel University (Angeles City, Philippines) are among the public collections holding work by Manansala. In 2012, Holy Angel University opened a section of its museum called The Vicente Manansala Collection, holding most of the estate left by the artist.

== Works ==
- Madonna of the Slums oil on lawanit board. 86 cm × 61 cm (34 in × 24 in). 1950.
- Machinery
- Birdman. 1973. - this painting was subjected to a forgery incident in 2012
- Jeepneys
- Magsasaka
- Pounding Rice
- Kalabaw (Carabao), oil on canvas, 28.5 in × 38 in (720 mm × 970 mm), 1965
- Murals "Stations of the cross " in the Church of the Parish of the Holy Sacrifice
- Bangkusay Seascape. 1940. Oil on canvas. 14 in × 18 in (360 mm × 460 mm).
- Pila Pila sa Bigas (Left and Right), 1980. Oil on canvas. 51 in × 84 in (1,300 mm × 2,100 mm).
- Planting the First Cross
- Seal of the Arellano University
- Slum Dwellers
- Bayanihan
- Balut Vendors
- Jansen Rodriguez
- Pamilya
- Reclining Mother and Child
- Dambana
- The Musicians
