= List of Filipino painters =

This is a list of notable Filipino painters.

(A-Z)

- Abad, Pacita (1946–2004)
- Abellana, Martino (1914–1986)
- Arellano, Juan (1888–1960)
- Alcuaz, Federico Aguilar (1932–2011)
- Amorsolo, Fernando (1892–1972)
- Amorsolo, Pablo (1898–1945)
- Ancheta, Isidro (1882–1946)
- Antonio, Angelito (born 1939)
- Antonio, Marcel (born 1965)
- Aute, Luis Eduardo (born 1943)
- Belleza, Norma (born 1939)
- Borlongan, Elmer (born 1967)
- Cabrera, Benedicto (born 1942)
- Calayag, Froilan (born 1982)
- Chen Bing Sun (1914-1988)
- De la Rosa, Fabián (1869–1937)
- Edades, Victorio C. (1895–1985)
- Francisco, Botong (1912–1969)
- Gorospe, Paco (1939–2002)
- Hidalgo, Felix Resurrección (1855–1913)
- Jaylo, Jon (born 1975)
- Joya, Jose T. (1931–1995)
- Kiukok, Ang (1931–2005)
- Legaspi, Cesar (1917–1994)
- Leynes, Nestor (1922–2016)
- Luna, Juan (1857–1899)
- Luz, Arturo R. (born 1926)
- Miranda, Nemesio "Nemi" (born 1949)
- Manansala, Vicente (1910–1981)
- Mapa, Jao (born 1976)
- Miclat, Maningning (1972–2000)
- Ocampo, Hernando R. (1911–1978)
- Olmedo, Onib (1937–1996)
- Ossorio, Alfonso A. (1916–1990)
- Parial, Mario (1944–2013)
- Saguil, Nena (1924–1994)
- Sillada, Danny (born 1963)
- Tabuena, Romeo Villalva (1921–2015)
- Tañedo, CJ (born 1979)
- Tapaya, Rodel (born 1980)
- Zóbel de Ayala y Montojo, Fernando (1924–1984)
