= Parial =

Parial is a surname. Notable people with the surname include:

- Biswanath Parial (born 1966), Indian politician
- Mario Parial (1944–2013), Filipino painter, printmaker, sculptor, and photographer
- Mikel Parial (born 1972), Filipino painter, photographer, and printmaker, son of Mario
