= Romeo P. Ariniego =

Filipino cardiologist and medical educator (1943–2023)

Romeo P. Ariniego MD, AFSC
- Born: Romeo Pilotin Ariniego; February 26, 1943; Vigan, Ilocos Sur, Philippines
- Died: January 16, 2023 (aged 79); Dasmariñas, Cavite, Philippines
- Other name: Dr. RA
- Education: Silliman University (BS); University of the Philippines College of Medicine (MD)
- Known for: Medical teaching; scholarship and library donations
- Awards: Distinguished Fellow Award, Philippine Heart Association (2018)
- Medical career
- Profession: Physician
- Field: Cardiology
- Institutions: De La Salle Health Sciences Institute

Romeo Pilotin Ariniego (February 26, 1943 – January 16, 2023), often called Dr. RA, was a Filipino cardiologist, medical educator and art collector. From 1987 he headed the cardiovascular division at the De La Salle Health Sciences Institute (now the De La Salle Medical and Health Sciences Institute) in Dasmariñas, Cavite, and he was twice dean of its College of Medicine. A library at the institute and an art gallery at Silliman University are named after him, and he helped pay for both.

Born into a poor family in Vigan, he worked his way through Silliman before studying medicine at the University of the Philippines. Later in life he funded medical scholarships at both schools. The Philippine Heart Association named him a Distinguished Fellow in 2018, and a year later the De La Salle Brothers made him an affiliated member of their order.

== Early life and education ==
Ariniego was born on February 26, 1943, in Vigan, Ilocos Sur, one of eight children of parents with little money. According to a 2013 profile in The Philippine Star, he made up his mind to become a doctor in the fifth grade, after watching a local physician comfort his family while an uncle was ill. His parents could not afford to send him to high school, and for a time he stopped attending. He was able to finish after the family of a classmate, the son of an American missionary in Vigan, took him on as part of their household staff and helped him through school.

He then took a business course at the University of the East, attending night classes while working in a cigarette factory during the day. After seeing an advertisement for a work-study program at Silliman University, he resigned from the factory; his employer and co-workers pooled money for his fare to Dumaguete and a semester's tuition. He arrived at Silliman in 1964 and worked as a janitor and messenger for the College of Arts and Sciences, as a desk assistant at the Doltz Hall dormitory, and as a gardener on weekends. He completed his pre-medical course in three years and received a Bachelor of Science degree in 1967. In his final year, a faculty member from Silliman's American mission helped him obtain a grant for medical school.

He studied medicine at the University of the Philippines College of Medicine, graduating in 1972, and completed his residency at the Philippine General Hospital, where he was appointed chief resident.

== Medical career ==
=== Training and early posts ===
After his residency, Ariniego trained abroad, completing a cardiology fellowship at Sahlgrenska Hospital in Sweden and further training in geriatric cardiology at Lidcombe Hospital in Sydney, Australia. Before joining De La Salle, he held teaching and administrative posts at the University of the Philippines colleges of medicine and nursing, at the Philippine General Hospital, and at the Emilio Aguinaldo College of Medicine. He was a fellow of the Philippine College of Physicians and the Philippine College of Cardiology.

=== De La Salle ===
At the De La Salle Health Sciences Campus in Dasmariñas, later the De La Salle Health Sciences Institute, he became chief of the cardiovascular division of the University Medical Center in 1987. From 1993 to 1999 he was the center's vice president and medical director. He was dean of the College of Medicine from 1999 to 2002 and again from 2005 to 2007, the second term concurrently with a vice presidency of the campus. De La Salle publications from 2013 and 2018 describe him as a former vice president for academics. By 2013 he had taught and held administrative posts there for 27 years.

=== Teaching and clinical practice ===
A 2013 article by De La Salle Philippines described him as strict on ward rounds with students who did not know their patients' conditions by heart, and as a mentor who helped students in need. For years he opened his home and his medical library to scholars who needed a place to stay or study. Both that article and The Philippine Star reported that his clinic had the longest queue of patients at the De La Salle University Medical Center. According to the Lasallian East Asia District, he did not charge consultation or professional fees to poor patients, to the school's scholars and rank-and-file staff, or to the De La Salle Brothers, whom he served as a physician for many years, including the retired Brothers at Residencia De La Salle. De La Salle Philippines reported that some patients gave him fruit, crops or chickens in place of a fee.

=== Research ===
Silliman University's 2010 award announcement described him as the author or co-author of nine scholarly publications. With A. Hjalmarson, F. Waagstein and others, he co-wrote a 1979 study in the British Heart Journal on the haemodynamic effects of a beta-1 receptor agonist in acute myocardial infarction and a 1981 report in the American Heart Journal on the clinical use of prenalterol in heart failure. He was also one of fifteen authors of a 1983 paper in The New England Journal of Medicine on a double-blind trial of metoprolol in 1,395 patients with suspected acute myocardial infarction, which found fewer cases of ventricular fibrillation in the metoprolol group than in the placebo group.

== Art collection ==
Ariniego collected paintings and sculpture by Filipino artists. In 2016 SunStar described him as a patron of the arts with an extensive collection of paintings by well-known Filipino artists. In October 2017 the Museo De La Salle at De La Salle University – Dasmariñas opened HeARTbeats: The Romeo Ariniego MD Art Collection, an exhibition of works from his collection by Jose Joya, Eduardo Castrillo, Oscar Zalameda, Solomon Saprid, Robert Nubla, Onib Olmedo, Emmanuel Garibay, Elmer Borlongan, Amado Castrillo, Zandro Castrillo, Ernie Verroya and Wilfredo Alicdan. The show, which ran until December 9, also marked 19 events from his life.

The DLSHSI library mounted HeARTbeats again in 2019 to coincide with the soft opening, on March 5, of the Romeo P. Ariniego, MD AFSC Gallery on its sixth floor. The institute said the gallery would be the permanent home of the collection, which he had given to it. According to the institute, some of the works were gifts from patients and their families, while others he had bought to support young artists.

== Philanthropy ==
=== De La Salle Health Sciences Institute ===
In 2007 Ariniego established an endowment fund for children of the school's support staff who wanted to become doctors. The Dr. Romeo P. Ariniego Scholarship Endowment Fund was still supporting students in 2018, and he also contributed to other programs, including the One La Salle Scholarship Fund.

He gave ₱10 million toward a new library for the school. Explaining his interest in the project, he said that as a student he had relied on librarians who were lenient with his borrowing, since he could not afford books of his own. Br. Gus Boquer unveiled the building plans in 2008, and the library opened on January 3, 2010, replacing a medicine library and satellite libraries that had been in use since 1994. The seven-storey building stands between the Wang Building and the College of Medicine Building. Four floors hold the library, and the building also houses his art collection. The collection is stored and exhibited in a gallery on the sixth floor. The Philippine Association of Academic/Research Librarians gave the building its Innovative Library Design Award in 2019. An exhibition marking the library's 15th anniversary ran from April 5 to May 31, 2025, for the benefit of the school's scholars. Doctor Romeo P. Ariniego MD Drive, a short one-way service road that runs from Governor Dominador Mangubat Boulevard into the campus, is also named after him.

In remarks reported by the physician Willie Ong in his Philippine Star column, Boquer said that Ariniego had pledged his life's earnings to De La Salle and had donated his house and lot, the donation to take effect after his death. According to De La Salle Philippines, the house was meant to give the institute's scholars a place to stay after his death.

=== Silliman University ===
Silliman University exhibited his private art collection in the foyer of the Claire Isabel McGill Luce Auditorium from August 24 to September 29, 2014, under the title Gasa sa Kakugi ("fruits of labor"). The exhibit included paintings by Jose T. Joya, H. R. Ocampo and Emmanuel Garibay, along with pieces from his collection of sculptures. The university said at the time that he had been donating to Silliman, had established an endowment fund there, and was turning over a significant number of his paintings.

The Romeo P. Ariniego Art Gallery, built with funds he provided, was inaugurated on August 23, 2017, during the university's Founders Day celebration. The two-storey building stands on the former archery range across from the Luce Auditorium, and at its opening it displayed works from his collection. During the same celebration he gave a further ₱10 million to fund scholarships for academically qualified students of limited means entering the Silliman University Medical School. Eligible applicants had to rank in the top ten percent of their graduating class, to have passed the National Medical Admission Test, and to have been admitted to the medical school. They also had to be children of Silliman staff whose salaries fell within the lowest 20 percent bracket, or dependents of families who had lived in Dumaguete or elsewhere in Negros Oriental for at least seven years and received benefits under the Pantawid Pamilyang Pilipino Program.

On February 4, 2018, the gallery opened an exhibition of work by Silliman's fine arts students. A separate section showed paintings he had entrusted to Silliman, with works by the three painters from the 2014 exhibit as well as by Solomon Saprid and Ernie Verroya.

== Later life and death ==
On February 10, 2019, in the Two Hearts of Jesus and Mary Chapel, the De La Salle Brothers gave Ariniego letters of affiliation from their Superior General, making him an affiliated member of the order with the post-nominal letters AFSC. Br. Jose Mari Jimenez, auxiliary visitor for the Philippines of the Lasallian East Asia District, said the honor recognized his life as a doctor and benefactor. Ariniego, who was ill at the time, sent a written response that was read by Dr. Dina Gonzales. He was the second person from the school's community to be affiliated, after Sr. Antoine Marie Villanueva, SPC.

Ariniego died in Dasmariñas on January 16, 2023, aged 79.

== Honors and awards ==
- 2005 – Outstanding Citizen in Health Education and Delivery, Vigan City
- 2007 – Distinguished Service Award, Philippine Heart Association
- 2010 – Outstanding Sillimanian Award in Medicine, Silliman University
- 2013 – Distinguished Teacher Award, Philippine Heart Association, presented on May 29, 2013, at the association's 44th annual convention (Note: The Philippine Heart Association's published list of college awardees records this award under 2012.)
- 2018 – Distinguished Fellow Award, Philippine Heart Association, presented on May 23, 2018, at the association's 49th annual convention
- National Lorenzo M. Tañada CHIMES Award, De La Salle Philippines
- International Health Professional distinction, received in Cambridge, England
