= Wilfredo Alicdan =

Filipino figurative artist (born 1965)

- Alicdan in 2008
- Born: Wilfredo Beltran Alicdan; February 22, 1965 (age 61); Dasmariñas, Cavite, Philippines
- Other name: Willy Alicdan
- Education: Philippine Women's University (BFA, 1986)
- Known for: Figurative painting
- Notable work: UNICEF greeting card designs; Song for Grace (2002); Portal View series (2021–2022)
- Movement: Figurative art
- Awards: Discovery Artist, Gallery Genesis (1992); General Emilio Aguinaldo Outstanding Achievement Award for Visual Arts (2007)
- Website: wilfredoalicdan.simplesite.com (archived)

Wilfredo Beltran Alicdan (born February 22, 1965) is a Filipino figurative artist known for paintings of rounded, faceless figures built from simplified geometric forms, often depicting courtship, family life, and children at play. He is a founding member of Anting-Anting, an artists' collective from Cavite, and since 1990 has exhibited in the Philippines, Hong Kong, Singapore, Malaysia, India, the United States, and the United Arab Emirates.

Alicdan studied fine arts at the Philippine Women's University and has painted full-time since 1992. Several of his paintings have been reproduced as UNICEF greeting cards, and his work is held in collections that include the De La Salle Medical and Health Sciences Institute. Since 2020 his work has become more explicitly geometric, in the Detour series and the 2021 solo exhibition Geometric Mode, which included works from his Portal View series of paintings made of words. His honors include an honorable mention in the 1989 Metrobank National Painting Competition and the 2007 General Emilio Aguinaldo Outstanding Achievement Award for Visual Arts.

== Early life and education ==
Alicdan was born on February 22, 1965, in Dasmariñas, Cavite, the eldest of eight children. He showed a talent for painting from an early age. He finished elementary school at Francisco E. Barzaga Memorial School in Dasmariñas in 1978. He graduated from Immaculate Conception Academy in 1982, where he received a gold medal as "Artist of the Year". He studied fine arts, majoring in painting, at the Philippine Women's University Institute of Fine Arts from 1983 to 1986, graduating with top honors and a Bachelor of Fine Arts degree.

== Career ==
=== 1989–1999: Early career ===
Alicdan received an honorable mention in the 1989 Metrobank National Painting Competition, and in 1990 his work was shown in the United States for the first time, in Pilipino Portfolio at the Fort Mason Center in San Francisco. He held his first solo exhibition, Buhay Pinoy, a show of 30 paintings, at Gallery Genesis in Manila in 1992. According to a 2007 awards profile, the show was well received, and the gallery named him its Discovery Artist for that year. Its scenes of everyday rural life and family bonds, such as Labandera ("Washerwoman"), Paluwas sa Maynila, and Mag-ina ("Mother and Child"), were painted with simple lines and few figures. He was a finalist in the Philippine Art Awards in Makati that year. From then on he worked as a full-time painter, exhibiting in Manila and elsewhere in Asia. One of his paintings, of a young couple seated on a carabao, appeared on the cover of the Sunday Inquirer Magazine on February 13, 1994, for an issue on the theme Romansang Pinoy ("Filipino Romance"). Through the rest of the decade he held solo exhibitions at the Ayala Museum (Sandosenang Eksena, 1993; Paskong Paksiw, 1995; Giliw, 1999) and at the Cultural Center of the Philippines (Sa Paglipad ng mga Lobo, 1994). He also entered the 1996 annual competition of the Art Association of the Philippines, whose catalogue reproduces his entry. His early record was documented in two Peso Book Foundation registries: Award Winners: A Visual Arts Registry (1996), which lists his Metrobank honorable mention, and Kayumanggi: Biographies of Philippine Visual Artists (2000), which carries his biography.

=== Anting-Anting ===
In the late 1990s Alicdan co-founded Anting-Anting, a collective of artists from Cavite (Note: Sources differ on the founding year. The Asia Art Archive describes the group as formed in 1997, while the group's own history, published for its tenth anniversary in 2009, dates the adoption of the name Anting-Anting to 1999.) named after the anting-anting, the protective amulet long associated in Philippine popular culture with the province. In its most familiar form the anting-anting is a bronze medallion engraved with figures, symbols, and words, often in Latin, of the kind still sold beside Quiapo Church in Manila. It grew out of the movement of visual artists to Cavite at the time, which brought together Cavite-based artists such as Emmanuel Garibay for informal workshops and group exhibitions. In 1999 its members adopted the name Anting-Anting after accepting a collaborative mural commission that required a legal group entity, and the same year a prominent Caviteño offered them a studio free of charge. By 2009 the collective had 11 members, among them Alfredo Esquillo Jr. and Joseph Lofranco, and its members described a friendship and camaraderie that had outlasted occasional differences and conflicts.

In 2000 the collective received a grant from the Metrobank Foundation for a traveling exhibition. It showed Sa Aming Bakuran at the Vargas Museum that year, and in 2001 Anting-Anting sa MAC at the Madrigal Art Center in Alabang, its third exhibition. Its first major exhibition came in 2002 at the Cultural Center of the Philippines, and the same year it served as a conduit for SUNDU-AN 3, a nationwide project led by the National Commission for Culture and the Arts. Alicdan was among the exhibitors. At the CCP, in the Bulwagang Juan Luna from June 13 to July 31, 14 members showed mixed-media works that treated the anting-anting not as an inert object but as a medium. (Note: The Tin-Aw Art Gallery exhibition history and a contemporaneous Philippine Daily Inquirer listing date the CCP exhibition to 2002; the Asia Art Archive catalogue record dates it to 2003.) At the Museo de La Salle, from August 29 to October 30, a show for the 25th anniversary of De La Salle University – Dasmariñas presented works on spirituality and Filipino culture and tradition. In 2003 the group showed Ubod at Boston Gallery and Surrounded by Anting-Anting at Surrounded by Water, both in Cubao, and took part in Dencities at the CCP.

In 2004 Arts Network Asia awarded the collective an exchange and collaborative residency program with the Malaysian collective Matahati, and in 2004 and 2005 the two groups staged joint exhibitions under the title MAGER Nusantara 05. In Kuala Lumpur the two groups held a mural exhibition at the National Art Gallery and a show at Art Salon; in Antipolo their show at Pinto Art Gallery, from February 27 to March 30, 2005, featured interactive paintings alongside individual canvases. The group's contribution in Kuala Lumpur was Perahu Kamalayan (2004), an outdoor mural that Alicdan painted with Esquillo, Garibay, Jose Austria, Lofranco, and Lawrence Borsoto. It envisioned a reversal of poverty in which "victims are vindicated and victimizers are punished". The mural was presented as a collaboration with Matahati, whose members Bayu Utomo Radjikin and Masnoor Ramli Mahmud also worked on it. In 2007 the art quarterly Image: Christ and Art in Asia featured the group's Huling Hapunan ("Last Supper"), which set the scene among junk food and bottles of beer, wine, and soft drinks and drew on the social themes of José Rizal's novels, and reproduced Alicdan's Pakape-Kape. The following year the group exhibited Bisperas at Art Verite Gallery in Serendra, Bonifacio Global City.

By its tenth anniversary few of the members still lived in Cavite, and they had come to regard the group as a barkada, a circle of friends who happened to be artists. The group marked the anniversary in 2009 and 2010 with a three-part cycle on heaven, earth, and hell, shown at three Manila galleries. Salvation History opened the cycle at Tin-Aw Art Gallery in Makati (September 11–30, 2009), where each member offered a personal vision of heaven; Alicdan's contribution was Hagway (2009), a 72 × 48 in oil on canvas. In his essay for the exhibition brochure, the critic Patrick D. Flores read its "heaven" as a kind of desire, "by turns utopian and catastrophic", and described the anting-anting as "the indigenous talisman that is invoked to make things happen". The second show, Lupa ("Earth"), was described by its artists as an attempt to make art work like an anting-anting, warning viewers of the dark forces around them or protecting them from those forces. (Note: Alicdan's exhibition history and the Asia Art Archive's catalogue record refer to the second show as Saving the Land, which is also the title of Alice G. Guillermo's essay in the 2010 catalogue. Contemporary press coverage names it Lupa, at Artspace in Glorietta 4, Makati.)

The cycle closed in April 2010 with Eternal Damn Nation at Manila Contemporary in Makati, centered on a mural on the 2010 elections that Alicdan painted with the other ten members. The oil on canvas, measuring 108 × 180 in, was the group's picture of hell. Among its dead spirits and ghouls were a crocodile in human form holding a smiling President Gloria Macapagal Arroyo and a dead Rizal with a bullet hole in his head; Manny Pacquiao appeared as a Christ-like figure, and the pierced body of Christ and the Sacred Heart stood for the hope of redemption. A catalogue of the cycle, with essays by Flores, Alice G. Guillermo, Edmundo Orlando, and Siddharta Perez, was published in 2010 and is held by the Asia Art Archive in Hong Kong, and the cycle is discussed in the Philippine visual arts journal Pananaw. The same 11 members were still exhibiting together in 2022.

=== 2000–2009: Paradeisos and Southeast Asia ===
Julius Babao viewing a painting by Alicdan at Art Verite Gallery, Bonifacio Global City, 2008

In 2000 he and Garibay held the two-person show Kasama ("Companion") at Galeriasia, a gallery in Hong Kong's Central district that promoted artists from Asia, from September 20 to October 17. A listing in the South China Morning Post on opening day, which called the show "Two Filipino Artists", characterized Garibay's paintings as "intense abstract" and "precise realistic" works and Alicdan's as "charming naive" works. Reviewing the show in the same paper nine days later, Amanda Watson described Alicdan's paintings as simple, charming narratives of contemporary Filipino life rendered in flat colors, with sparse detail and "studied" body language, and suggested he had arrived at his career almost by accident. She contrasted his work with that of Garibay, a founding member of the collective Sanggawa, whose intense, socially committed paintings she described as social realism. Although the two seemed to have little in common, she wrote, both painted people and the human condition, and together they gave a sense of where Filipino art was heading.

Paradeisos, his sixth solo exhibition, opened at Liongoren Gallery in Cubao on April 24, 2002, and moved to Kaloob Hall in Makati Cinema Square from May 13 to 31. Reviewing it in the Philippine Daily Inquirer, Gino Dormiendo observed that in an age of globalization and information technology Alicdan's work "may seem preposterously anachronistic". Since Buhay Pinoy, he wrote, the painter had kept to the Filipino nuclear family in a rural setting, its members engaged in folk activities from prayer and celebration to play and leisure. With Paradeisos, however, the 37-year-old had "surprisingly chosen to mark a new chapter" in his career. About half of the 16 works (Note: An Inquirer arts listing announcing the opening described the show as 15 oil paintings; Dormiendo's review counts 16 works on display.) left behind his usual square canvases for vertical and horizontal formats, the figures were stretched beyond their familiar round shapes, and solid hues gave way to the colors of fruits and flowers.

Song for Grace, a diptych, paired a full-bodied figure of his new wife, Grace, the work's namesake and his muse, with a dark figure of a violinist standing for the artist. Paradeisos (Luke 43) showed Christ on Calvary between the two thieves, the unrepentant one and the one who repented and was saved, with the bodies turned away so that only their contours conveyed the agony of the scene. In Hope a mother holds her baby while her two older children play with the youngest. The largest work, Ritual at the Entrance, which Dormiendo thought uncharacteristic of the artist, showed a nude couple playing a flute and a small guitar, their bodies marked by calligraphic brushstrokes. Dormiendo acknowledged complaints about the "grossly inflated" bodies of his women but defended them as figures of Mother Earth, whose roles from giving birth to nurturing life called for bodies "strong, hefty and rotund". With this celebration of women, children, and family, he concluded, Alicdan had "regained his paradise".

His other solo shows in the Philippines during the decade were In My Quiet Room at Red Dot Gallery (2003), Relish at Blueline Gallery in Rustan's Makati (2007–2008), and Random Delight at Art Verite Gallery at Serendra in Bonifacio Global City (2008). Art Verite had represented him online through the French-based art platform Artmajeur since 2007. On August 31, 2007, the provincial government of Cavite, under Governor Ayong Maliksi, presented him with its fifth General Emilio Aguinaldo award for visual arts at a ceremony in Tagaytay. He was one of eight awardees that year, among them the singer Lani Misalucha and the biochemist Lourdes J. Cruz, and the board of judges included the former prime minister Cesar Virata.

He also took part in the touring exhibition Through the Palette's Eye, a collection of paintings on artists' palettes owned by the Singapore-based Filipino collectors Rico and Melannie Hizon. His palette was shown alongside those of BenCab, Pacita Abad, Ronald Ventura, and Garibay, among others. First shown at the Crucible Gallery in September 2005, the collection toured university museums in 2006 and closed at the Cultural Center of the Philippines in 2007.

Other group shows of the period included Rooster Paintings at Galerie Joaquin in The Podium, Mandaluyong, marking the Year of the Rooster (2005), Sulyap at the Sentro Oftalmologico of the Philippine General Hospital (2005), and Tipon: Artists Organizing at the Metropolitan Museum of Manila (2006). Tipon was a survey of artist collectives curated by Brenda Fajardo and Bobi Valenzuela, in which Anting-Anting showed alongside groups such as the Davao Artists Foundation, Ang Ink, and the Pampanga Arts Guild. In 2005 his work returned to the United States, in Gallery Night at Abode Gallery in Providence, Rhode Island. (Note: The 2007 awards profile dates the Abode Gallery group show to 2006.) In July 2008 he was among more than 125 artists, including BenCab and Malang, in Art 40 at Pinto Art Gallery, a benefit exhibition that the newscaster Julius Babao organized for his 40th birthday to fund a Gawad Kalinga housing village in Bagong Silang, Caloocan. During the same period he lent paintings to UNICEF Philippines for its greeting cards, including the 2006 Christmas collection, and Philippine media came to call him a "UNICEF artist". In 2006 the Inquirer reported that UNICEF card sets by Alicdan and Manuel Baldemor were among the most popular with Filipino buyers. Alicdan's design that year, Home for Christmas, was sold in sets of ten cards.

Abroad, he represented the Philippines in 2003 in the RENGA (Linked-Image) Project, also known as RENGA: Chained Painting, a workshop and exhibition at the National Art Gallery in Kuala Lumpur in which the Malaysian painter Bayu Utomo Radjikin took part as well. In renga ("linked images"), a collaborative method developed in Japan in the early 1990s, each participant takes an image made by another, reworks it, and passes it on.

Singapore became a regular venue over the next several years. After Beyond Borders at The Substation in 2006, he showed several times at Art Space, a gallery in the Royal Plaza on Scotts hotel on Scotts Road that is open around the clock and hosts exhibitions by invited galleries. There he took part in Convergence: Faces of Filipino Contemporary Art and in Playful Moods, a two-person show with Allan Balisi, in 2007. He held the solo exhibitions Fruition there in 2008 and Cloud Nine in 2009, (Note: Alicdan's own exhibition history dates Cloud Nine to 2010.) and in 2009 he showed in Convergence, a three-person exhibition with the Brazilian painter Deise Dias Cavalheiro and the French painter Anne Severyns.

In Malaysia he took part in Emerging Fires at Taksu Gallery (2006) and Tiga Seni ("Three Sides of Art") at the Soka Gakkai Malaysia building in Kuala Lumpur (2007). He and five fellow Anting-Anting members were among the seven Philippine participants in Artriangle, a three-country exhibition organized by Matahati at the same venue, which brought together 66 painters from Malaysia, Indonesia, and the Philippines and raised money for the Matahati Art Fund. (Note: It is not clear from the sources whether Tiga Seni and Artriangle were the same exhibition. Matahati coordinator Bayu Utomo Radjikin acted as spokesman for Artriangle, a recurring Matahati fundraising exhibition held at Soka Gakkai Malaysia in 2007 and 2008, with a third edition at the National Art Gallery in 2010.)

In late 2009 he was one of about 49 artists, Garibay and Lofranco among them, in Unos at Banaag ("Storm and Ray of Hope"). Liongoren Gallery and the Operation Blessing Foundation organized the benefit show to pay for medical missions and livelihood workshops for victims of Typhoon Pepeng in Pangasinan. It opened in Cubao on November 26 and later traveled to Dagupan. (Note: Sources differ on the dates. The Philippine Star gives the Cubao run as November 26 to December 9, 2009. Other accounts give it as running until December 4, followed by Dagupan from December 7 to 20, or give the Dagupan showing, at 301 Tapuac District, as December 12 to 26.)

=== 2010–2019: Cavite and Joie de Vivre ===
In 2012 he showed Unplugged Ceremony at Galerie Anna in SM Megamall, from February 7 to 21. The gallery described it as an exploration of the current state of the country, and Alicdan described it as a moment to set aside fear and worry: "Let's plug off some weight of burden and worries, and for a while let's enjoy and relax extreme happiness. It's a colorful life." That year he showed at the India Art Festival in Mumbai and in the United States at AKR Fusion Gallery in Fort Worth, Texas, during ArtsGoggle, the city's non-juried Near Southside arts festival. In 2013 he held The Wall of Values at the Museo de La Salle, De La Salle University – Dasmariñas, and was the featured artist when Art Elements Asian Gallery opened at SM Aura Premier in Taguig on October 23. His exhibition there, Indissoluble, took its title from the bond that holds families together and ran until November 5. The gallery placed him in its Featured Artist section, alongside a Masters section of works by National Artists and other senior painters. He continued to take part in group exhibitions at Galerie Anna, including Ni Hao (2013), a Chinese New Year show, and Iskwalado (2015), the gallery's annual survey of contemporary Filipino painting, first mounted in 2009, in which several dozen artists each paint on a canvas of the same size.

In January 2017 he contributed to Art & Advocacy, a silent auction for the Hepatology Society of the Philippines' hepatitis B campaign, B-Aware. He took part in the Paghilom Art Camp and Festival in Cavite, initiated for National Arts Month by Emmanuel Garibay and his artist children Alee, Nina, and Bam. As part of the festival, the Museo de La Salle mounted Pamana ("Heritage") from January 30 to March 11, 2017, gathering original works by 25 Cavite artists, accompanied by a series of artists' talks. The exhibition looked to the wisdom of the past as a way of healing present social problems and encouraged artists and viewers to return to their roots. Later that year his work appeared at the same museum in HeARTbeats: The Romeo Ariniego MD Art Collection, drawn from the collection of the De La Salle Medical and Health Sciences Institute cardiologist Romeo Ariniego, alongside works by José Joya, Garibay, and others. The show opened in October 2017 for Museums and Galleries Month and ran until December 9. It marked 19 events in Ariniego's life, each shown as a heartbeat.

In 2018 he had his first exhibition in Bacolod, Joie de Vivre (March 14 – April 14), at Charlie's Art Gallery. The exhibition comprised 14 oil paintings, among them the large square canvases Picnic, Tourney, and Nagkakahiyaan (each 48 × 48 in). He showed at World Art Dubai, at the Dubai World Trade Centre, the same year.

=== 2020–present: Detour, Geometric Mode, and Portal View ===
#twinning displayed at the Secret Fresh Gallery during the Detour exhibition, 2020

In early 2020 Alicdan began a new series, Detour, in which his figures' black heads became eyes. He has described the series as beginning with a journey interrupted by traffic, rain, and detours, after which the artist wakes alone on a road where reality no longer behaves as expected, and in which the figures watch rather than act. In Praying for World Peace, bullet-like forms kneel in prayer; in Learning New Skills, a car rides a bicycle; and in Feeling Worthless, gold appears as a beggar. Work from the series was shown that year in a solo exhibition at Secret Fresh Gallery in San Juan. In 2020 he joined the online marketplace Saatchi Art. The site lists his recent works under categories that include geometric minimalism and surrealism, and it featured him in its curated "New This Week" selections in November 2021 and September 2026.

From September 4 to 15, 2021, his solo exhibition Geometric Mode ran at The Artologist Gallery in Shangri-La Plaza, Mandaluyong. BusinessWorld listed the show in its arts column. The exhibition statement described the works as inspired by the COVID-19 pandemic, in which people seemed to live inside an "invisible geometry" of limited time and space set by state-enforced restrictions, and said the artist was pushing his geometric tendencies toward more minimal, almost abstract compositions. Its featured work was LDR (2021; acrylic on canvas, 48 × 48 in). Saatchi Art lists the painting under the figurative, minimalist, pop art, modern, and abstract styles.

Two of the works in Geometric Mode, Missing Z and GIG (God Is Great), belong to Portal View, a series he began that year in which each picture consists of a sentence spelled out in geometric letterforms. Mona Lisa (77 × 53 cm) reads "This is a replica of Da Vinci's Mona Lisa", Spoliarium Boceto (46 × 24 in) "This is another long-lost boceto of Juan Luna's Spoliarium", and Self Portrait (48 × 33 in) "Self portrait as a billionaire counting lots of money". He has explained that in portal viewing no direct images are visible, so that the viewer becomes the artist and paints the picture in their mind, and that the "reformatted images" are also meant for interstellar viewing, since paintings would not be recognized by visitors from another planet. Later works in the series include Proxima Centauri (2021), the quadriptych Unidentified Glowing Objects in Action (2021), Blank Canvas (2022), which reads "This is a super hyperrealistic painting of a blank canvas", and The Peace Paradox (2022), a checkerboard of letters inspired by the slogan "War is Peace" in George Orwell's Nineteen Eighty-Four.

He returned to Shangri-La Plaza for an Artologist group exhibition on August 14–20, 2023, alongside ten other Filipino painters. In October his work was included in Orasyon: Dasal ng Pamilyang Pilipino, an exhibition of 48 works on the Angelus from the collection of Ron L. David, at the UST Museum from October 3 to November 7, 2023. (Note: The university's announcement at the opening gave the closing date as October 30, 2023, as did Spot.ph; the university's later report gives November 7.) Curated by Isidro Abaño, O.P., and John Carlo Sayco, the show traced the Angelus from its medieval Italian origins to its place in Filipino family life. It opened at 6 p.m. on October 3 with the Angelus, led by Abaño. Besides the works from David's collection, it included paintings by Carlos "Botong" Francisco and Jose de los Reyes from the museum's own collection. The artists shown from David's collection included Anita Magsaysay-Ho, Norma Belleza, and Garibay, and the museum later published an exhibition catalogue.

His more recent paintings include Mother (2026), an oil on canvas showing a woman in a red dress bending to redirect a faceless child in a dark suit. He has described it as protest art inspired by Banksy, aimed at politicians who exploit patriotism, with the mother as "a force of love, hope, and guidance" for the next generation.

== Style and technique ==
Alicdan's paintings combine elements of folk art with a geometric vocabulary, placing faceless figures against plain fields of color. His subjects come mostly from Filipino family and rural life.

=== Subjects ===
His works have been described as quaint, geometric folk representations, populated by rounded, stylized figures usually engaged in traditional and rural activities. Alicdan developed his figurative style in the 1990s. His early narratives, set in a world more rural than urban, follow courtship, the raising of a family, and simple provincial life, told, in the words of his artist's statement, from a male point of view that is "childlike and tender". His family scenes commonly show children playing with their parents, mothers with children, and couples embracing, often humorously. Other works depict imaginary scenes, such as a couple riding a motorcycle through space, a family placing its house on a map, or lovers separated by walls.

His paintings have also addressed social and political subjects. In Lolong Ride, shown in Unplugged Ceremony (2012), a corrupt government official and his family ride Lolong, the saltwater crocodile captured in Agusan del Sur, playing on the habit of likening politicians to crocodiles. Foreign Service, from the same show, depicts a mother cleaning a luxurious house that is not her own, a comment on the lives of Filipino domestic workers abroad, and Migrate shows a family looking for a new place to live. His captions for later works also touch on migration and conflict. Support System shows a man on an airplane held aloft by a woman and child; he has called it a tribute to families who support someone leaving "for work, migration, or the pursuit of a better future". The Gentle Pause (2026), in which a child offers coffee to a man holding a hammer, draws on "the emotional landscape of regions shaped by ongoing conflict". His recent family scenes include Guided Growth (2026), which shows a father whose body lifts a mother and child upward, and The Working Dad, a Father's Day tribute showing a fisherman hauling his net with his child on his shoulders.

=== Method ===
Alicdan works mainly in oil and acrylic on canvas, and several of his canvases, among them The Strange Little Band, Picnic, and LDR, are square, at 48 × 48 in. He has also worked in colored sand on canvas. Each painting begins with a single solid background, on which he sets down dominant black circles that serve as the heads of his faceless figures. He has said that the bright colors of the bodies are meant as a counterpoint to the black heads, and that the background color is the most important choice, since it often dictates the colors that follow.

The figures are made of rounded limbs shaped by straight lines, running parallel or meeting at right angles. They are painted in basic solid hues of moderate intensity, with light, consistent modeling to give them volume and mass, and the colors of the figures interact with those of the plain ground behind them. The result has been described as a balance of opposites, in which the solid colors and flat backgrounds keep the picture two-dimensional while the modeling gives the figures a sculptural roundness and an illusion of three-dimensionality. He limits each work to a few elements, often only one or two figures, painted without tonal gradation. Because the figures have no faces, expression depends largely on their arrangement and posture, and attention stays on composition in space and expressive gesture, which have been identified as his main concerns.

=== Development ===
Feeling Worthless displayed at the Secret Fresh Gallery during the Detour exhibition, 2020

In his early exhibitions of the 1990s the uniformly round figures were composed to fill a square format against backgrounds of plain primary or secondary colors applied evenly, and were fitted closely to the limited space while still allowing acrobatic postures.

Dormiendo saw Paradeisos (2002) as a new chapter, marked by rectangular formats, stretched figures, and a brighter palette. His handling of space also changed. In earlier work the figures stand against a flat background; later the background becomes a box-like room that encloses them, much like a viewing box with the fourth wall removed, or a miniature stage. In some of these rooms he uses a kind of trompe-l'œil: the edges of the floor do not quite meet the corners of the walls, and the walls may be painted in different colors or covered in fine stripes, creating small tricks of perception. As Cavite industrialized, his rural settings gave way to a partly urban visual vocabulary.

In the years before Detour, his artist's statement says, he drew out the "lucid character" of his work as a visual game, and his compositions became surreal, dreamlike arrangements of symbols and images, which he has likened to mirrors showing viewers things they recognize, with a relaxed surface over heavier subject matter. The Detour series, begun in early 2020, was fully surreal; he has described its theme as a visual analogy of the present time and of his own experience as a single father. Geometric Mode (2021), made in response to life under pandemic restrictions, pushed his geometry toward minimal, almost abstract compositions, and included works from Portal View, a series that does away with images altogether and replaces them with words.

=== Influences ===
Alicdan has linked his family scenes to growing up in a large family. His 2007 awards profile found traces of Cavite's "machismo" in his outlook, particularly in Ay!, Pahalik ("Kiss"), and Tampuhan ("Sulking"), and saw the influence of the Colombian painter Fernando Botero in the heads and round bodies and limbs of the figures in Buhay Pinoy. The statement for Geometric Mode (2021) named the National Artist Arturo Luz as an early influence whose presence was "very evident" in that collection.

He has also drawn directly on earlier art and literature. LDR (2021), the featured work of Geometric Mode, was inspired by Pablo Picasso's The Dream (1932), and Mother (2026) by Banksy. Several Portal View works take as their subjects Leonardo da Vinci's Mona Lisa, Juan Luna's Spoliarium, and George Orwell's Nineteen Eighty-Four. Religious subjects recur, from Paradeisos (Luke 43) to Praying for World Peace. Anting-Anting's collective works, including Huling Hapunan and the mural Eternal Damn Nation, engaged with Philippine history and politics.

== Reception ==
Most writing on Alicdan, beginning with Amanda Watson's 2000 review in the South China Morning Post, has focused on the simplicity and clarity of his work. Other essays on his work include two by the critic Alice G. Guillermo, "Squaring the Circle: Alicdan's Folk Narrative" (1992) and "A New Type of Genre" (2008), as well as Fay V. Gumba's "Coming Full Circle with Binilog" (2007) and Dave Lock's "Unplugged Ceremony" (2012). Charlie's Art Gallery wrote that his bold shapes and plain backgrounds draw the viewer to form and composition rather than detail. His paintings have been described as recognizable even from a distance because of their vivid colors.

His work has been featured in Italian, Spanish, Russian, and Portuguese-language articles on his geometric folk figures and his work for UNICEF. Italian writers have described his colorful canvases of family life as among the simplest and most recognizable in contemporary genre painting, citing their clarity, evenness, and harmony and the rounded volume of his figures and of the animals and objects around them. In Spain his painting has been called "a generous art", and his UNICEF work was the subject of a fictional postage-stamp design. Russian writers have described his figures as people "assembled" from stylized geometric shapes, going about everyday tasks or working in the fields, noting that most of his works are devoted to Filipino women. A 2015 Portuguese-language feature found a sense of harmony in his canvases, calling them moving and beautiful, and wrote that his figures portray the Filipino people in a singular way. In January 2021 the Instagram art magazine Art Mag featured nine of his paintings, describing his work as whimsical, geometric, playful, and thought-provoking, and as offering a distinctive perspective on Filipino culture. He has been classified as a genre painter.

In Cavite he has been held up as a figure of local pride. In February 2022 Athena Tolentino, then a Tagaytay councilor and later governor of Cavite, chose him for Sariling Atin, Ipagmalaki ("Our Own, Be Proud"), a series promoting the province's artists, which presented him as an award-winning figurative artist who supports UNICEF through his art and whose scenes of Filipino family life draw on his childhood memories. Two years later the Hiraya Visual Arts Club of Philippine Christian University marked his birthday with a tribute that called him "a truly inspiring artist to society" and read his "simple yet geometric figures" as stories of rural and traditional family life.

Alongside the Peso Book Foundation registries, Alicdan has an entry in the first volume of the Encyclopedia of Philippine Art (2005), compiled by Marlene Aguilar. His Hong Kong exhibition of 2000 is recorded in the Hong Kong Visual Arts Yearbook published by the Chinese University of Hong Kong and the Hong Kong Arts Development Council. The collective is also named in Nafas, the online art magazine produced from 2003 to 2016 by Universes in Universe for Germany's Institut für Auslandsbeziehungen with funding from the Federal Foreign Office, in its profile of the Perak Arts Foundation. He is among the more than a thousand artists in The Philippine Art Book, a two-volume A–Z sourcebook of Filipino artists from the seventeenth century to the present, published by Artes de las Filipinas in 2022. Its research was carried out between 2012 and 2020 through interviews, letters to artists' families, and library work.

== Collections ==
President Arroyo walks past Alicdan's work displayed at the DASCA building

Several of his works hang in Dasmariñas, including at the DASCA Building, the Pagamutan ng Dasmariñas, Volet's Hotel and Resort, and Sari Café. In April 2010 President Gloria Macapagal Arroyo viewed one of his paintings at the DASCA Building during an inauguration in Dasmariñas. The De La Salle Medical and Health Sciences Institute holds one of his untitled sand paintings (78.5 × 60 cm). Private collectors of his work include Ron L. David, the cardiologist Romeo Ariniego, and the BBC World News anchor Rico Hizon and his wife Melannie Syquia-Hizon, whose art-events venture Art Sentral Asia featured Filipino artists in exhibitions in Singapore and Indonesia. His association with the Hizons continued, and in 2016 he was one of the artists, with BenCab and fellow Anting-Anting member Christian Tamondong, who attended Rico Hizon's 50th-birthday celebration in Makati. In November 2019 Rex Mangubat, then vice mayor of Dasmariñas, received two of his paintings as a gift.

=== Art market ===
Two of his paintings were offered in the 20th edition of León Exchange, León Gallery's online auction in Makati, held from July 16 to 18, 2021: Family (2008; lot 684), a 30 × 48 in oil, and an untitled acrylic from 2010 (lot 374), measuring 48 × 36 in. Each was listed at ₱20,000. At its Modern & Contemporary Auction on January 29, 2026, Leland Little Auction & Estate Sales in North Carolina offered two of his works from a single private collection in Chapel Hill, listed under its Asian arts department. Both were signed and dated oils from 2006 on long, narrow canvases: Song (lot 6244), a horizontal work retaining a gallery label on the reverse, and the vertical The Embrace (lot 6245). According to the art-market database MutualArt, The Embrace realized US$450, the highest price recorded for his work at auction since 2021. On Saatchi Art, his oil painting Balance (2018), one of the works shown in Joie de Vivre, is listed as sold at US$950. In 2026 his work was also offered by e Art Gallery in India.

== Awards and honors ==
- 1989 – Honorable mention, Metrobank National Painting Competition
- 1992 – Finalist, Philippine Art Awards, Makati
- 1992 – Discovery Artist, Gallery Genesis
- 2003 – Represented the Philippines, RENGA (Linked-Image) Project, National Art Gallery, Kuala Lumpur
- 2005 – Gawad Pagpapahalaga sa mga Natatanging Mamamayan ng Dasmariñas sa Larangan ng Sining-Biswal (recognition of outstanding citizens of Dasmariñas in the visual arts)
- 2007 – 5th General Emilio Aguinaldo Outstanding Achievement Award for Visual Arts (fine arts, Dasmariñas), presented on August 31, 2007, at the Tagaytay International Convention Center, Tagaytay

== Personal life ==
Alicdan married around 2002; a review of Paradeisos that year noted that he had recently wed, and that the diptych Song for Grace was named for his wife, Grace. In an artist's statement written after 2020, he describes himself as a single father. He speaks English and Filipino. He is based in Dasmariñas, Cavite.

== Exhibitions ==
=== Solo exhibitions ===
Solo exhibitions of Wilfredo Alicdan
Year	Title	Venue	Location	Dates	Ref.
1992	Buhay Pinoy	Gallery Genesis	Manila		
1993	Sandosenang Eksena	Ayala Museum	Makati		
1994	Sa Paglipad ng mga Lobo	Cultural Center of the Philippines	Pasay		
1995	Paskong Paksiw	Ayala Museum	Makati		
1999	Giliw	Ayala Museum	Makati		
2002	Paradeisos	Liongoren Gallery, 111 New York Street; then Kaloob Hall, Makati Cinema Square	Cubao, Quezon City; Makati	From April 24; Kaloob Hall May 13–31	
2003	In My Quiet Room	Red Dot Gallery	Makati		
2007	Relish	Blueline Gallery, 4/F Rustan's	Makati	December 15, 2007 – January 15, 2008	
2008	Random Delight	Art Verite Gallery, Serendra	Bonifacio Global City, Taguig		
2008	Fruition	Art Space, Royal Plaza on Scotts	Singapore		
2009	Cloud Nine	Art Space, Royal Plaza on Scotts	Singapore		
2012	Unplugged Ceremony	Galerie Anna, The Artwalk, SM Megamall	Mandaluyong	February 7–21	
2013	The Wall of Values	Museo de La Salle, De La Salle University – Dasmariñas	Dasmariñas		
2013	Indissoluble	Art Elements Asian Gallery, SM Aura Premier	Taguig	October 23 – November 5	
2018	Joie de Vivre	Charlie's Art Gallery, Italia restaurant, Paseo Verde Building, Lacson Street	Bacolod	March 14 – April 14	
2020	Detour	Secret Fresh Gallery	San Juan		
2021	Geometric Mode	The Artologist Gallery, Art Plaza, Level 4, Main Wing, Shangri-La Plaza	Mandaluyong	September 4–15	

=== Two- and three-person exhibitions ===
Two- and three-person exhibitions
Year	Title	With	Venue	Location	Ref.
2000	Kasama	Emmanuel Garibay	Galeriasia, 6/F One Lan Kwai Fong	Hong Kong	
2007	Playful Moods	Allan Balisi	Art Space, Royal Plaza on Scotts	Singapore	
2009	Convergence	Deise Dias Cavalheiro and Anne Severyns	Art Space, Royal Plaza on Scotts	Singapore	

=== Selected group exhibitions ===
Selected group exhibitions
Year	Title	Venue	Location	Notes	Ref.
1990	Pilipino Portfolio	Fort Mason Center	San Francisco		
2000	Sa Aming Bakuran	Vargas Museum, University of the Philippines Diliman	Quezon City	Anting-Anting	
2001	Anting-Anting sa MAC	Madrigal Art Center	Alabang, Muntinlupa	Anting-Anting; the group's third exhibition, until August 30	
2002	Anting-Anting Exhibition	Museo de La Salle, De La Salle University – Dasmariñas	Dasmariñas	Anting-Anting; August 29 – October 30	
2002	Anting-Anting Art Exhibit	Bulwagang Juan Luna, Cultural Center of the Philippines	Pasay	Anting-Anting; June 13 – July 31	
2003	Ubod	Boston Gallery	Cubao, Quezon City		
2003	RENGA (Linked-Image) Project	National Art Gallery	Kuala Lumpur	Workshop and exhibition	
2003	Dencities	Cultural Center of the Philippines	Pasay		
2003	Surrounded by Anting-Anting	Surrounded by Water	Cubao, Quezon City	Anting-Anting	
2004	MAGER Nusantara 05	National Art Gallery	Kuala Lumpur	Anting-Anting and Matahati; mural exhibition (Perahu Kamalayan)	
2004	MAGER Nusantara 05	Art Salon	Kuala Lumpur	Anting-Anting and Matahati	
2005	MAGER Nusantara 05	Pinto Art Gallery	Antipolo	Anting-Anting and Matahati; February 27 – March 30	
2005	Sulyap	Sentro Oftalmologico, Philippine General Hospital	Manila		
2005	Gallery Night	Abode Gallery	Providence, Rhode Island		
2005	Rooster Paintings	Galerie Joaquin, The Podium	Mandaluyong	Year of the Rooster; until February 25	
2005–2007	Through the Palette's Eye	Crucible Gallery; De La Salle University; Vargas Museum; University of Santo Tomas; Enderun Colleges; Cultural Center of the Philippines	Metro Manila	Touring exhibition of paintings on palettes; CCP showing March 23 – May 7, 2007	
2006	Beyond Borders	The Substation	Singapore		
2006	Emerging Fires	Taksu Gallery	Kuala Lumpur		
2006	Anting-Anting Exhibition	ArteXchange Gallery	Makati	Anting-Anting	
2006	Tipon: Artists Organizing	Metropolitan Museum of Manila	Manila	Anting-Anting; opened October 19	
2007	Convergence: Faces of Filipino Contemporary Art	Art Space, Royal Plaza on Scotts	Singapore		
2007	Tiga Seni	Soka Gakkai Malaysia building	Kuala Lumpur		
2008	Art 40	Pinto Art Gallery	Antipolo	Benefit exhibition organized by Julius Babao for Gawad Kalinga; July	
2008	Love Story	Philam Life lobby, United Nations Avenue	Manila		
2008	Bisperas	Art Verite Gallery, Serendra	Bonifacio Global City, Taguig		
2009	Salvation History	Tin-Aw Art Gallery (new space), Somerset Olympia, Makati Avenue	Makati	Anting-Anting tenth anniversary, part 1; September 11–30	
2009	Unos at Banaag	Liongoren Gallery	Cubao, Quezon City; Dagupan	Typhoon Pepeng benefit	
2010	Lupa	Artspace, Glorietta 4	Makati	Anting-Anting tenth anniversary, part 2; also listed as Saving the Land	
2010	Eternal Damn Nation	Manila Contemporary Whitespace, Pasong Tamo Extension	Makati	Anting-Anting tenth anniversary, part 3	
2012	India Art Festival	Studio 3, MMRDA Grounds, Bandra Kurla Complex	Mumbai		
2012	ArtsGoggle 2012	AKR Fusion Gallery	Fort Worth, Texas		
2013	Ni Hao	Galerie Anna, SM Megamall	Mandaluyong		
2015	Iskwalado	Galerie Anna, SM Megamall	Mandaluyong		
2017	Pamana	Museo de La Salle, De La Salle University – Dasmariñas	Dasmariñas	January 30 – March 11	
2017	HeARTbeats: The Romeo Ariniego MD Art Collection	Museo de La Salle, De La Salle University – Dasmariñas	Dasmariñas	October – December 9	
2018	World Art Dubai	Za'abeel Hall 3, Dubai World Trade Centre	Dubai		
2022	Anting-Anting Group	Kalyehon Cafe	Imus	Anting-Anting; June 16 – July 15	
2023	The Artologist group exhibition	Grand Atrium, Main Wing, Shangri-La Plaza	Mandaluyong	August 14–20	
2023	Orasyon: Dasal ng Pamilyang Pilipino	UST Museum	Manila	October 3 – November 7	
Undated	Artriangle	Soka Gakkai Malaysia building	Kuala Lumpur	Organized by Matahati	

== Selected works ==
Selected works by Wilfredo Alicdan
Year	Title	Medium	Dimensions	Notes	Ref.
1992	Labandera ("Washerwoman")			Shown in Buhay Pinoy	
1992	Mag-ina ("Mother and Child")			Shown in Buhay Pinoy	
2002	Paradeisos (Luke 43)			Christ and the two thieves on Calvary; shown in Paradeisos	
2002	Ritual at the Entrance			Largest work in Paradeisos	
2002	Song for Grace			Diptych named for his wife, Grace; shown in Paradeisos	
2004	Perahu Kamalayan	Mural		Collaborative outdoor mural by Anting-Anting, National Art Gallery, Kuala Lumpur	
2006	Home for Christmas			UNICEF Philippines greeting card set	
2006	The Embrace	Oil on canvas	48 × 11⅛ in	Signed and dated lower left; offered by Leland Little Auction & Estate Sales, 2026 (lot 6245); realized US$450	
2008	Family	Oil on canvas	30 × 48 in (76 × 122 cm)	A family playing basketball together; signed and dated lower center; offered by León Gallery, 2021 (lot 684)	
2009	Hagway	Oil on canvas	72 × 48 in	Shown in Salvation History	
2010	Eternal Damn Nation	Oil on canvas	108 × 180 in	Collaborative mural by the 11 members of Anting-Anting	
2018	Balance	Oil on canvas	30 × 18 in (76.2 × 45.7 cm)	Family subject; shown in Joie de Vivre, 2018; sold on Saatchi Art (listed at US$950)	
2020	Praying for World Peace			Detour series; bullet-like forms kneeling in prayer	
2021	LDR	Acrylic on canvas	48 × 48 in	Featured work of Geometric Mode; inspired by Picasso's The Dream	
2021	Mona Lisa		77 × 53 cm	Portal View series	
2022	The Peace Paradox			Portal View series; inspired by "War is Peace" in Orwell's Nineteen Eighty-Four	
2024	Duo	Oil on canvas	48 × 36 in	A violinist and a saxophonist; signed and dated 2024; offered by e Art Gallery, India, 2026	
2026	Mother	Oil on canvas		Inspired by Banksy	

== See also ==
- Philippine art
- List of Filipino painters
