= ONIB =

ONIB or Onib may refer to:

- "One Night in Bangkok", a song from the concept album and subsequent musical Chess
- Onib Olmedo (1937–1996), award-winning expressionist Filipino painter
