= Simkin de Pio =

Filipino painter and conservator

- Born: March 17, 1976 (age 50); Quezon City, the Philippines
- Occupation: Artist
- Relatives: Father: Gig de Pio Siblings: Vincent de Pio, Gig Jr. de Pio, Domino de Pio, and Julian de Pio

Simkin de Pio (born March 17, 1976, in Quezon City) is a Filipino painter, conservator and restorer. The eldest son of renowned Filipino realist painter Gig de Pio and Fe Esterlina, his siblings include Las Vegas-based painter Gig Jr. and Manila-based painter Vincent de Pio.

In 1994 de Pio graduated from the Ateneo de Manila High School and in 1998 entered the University of the Philippines College of Fine Arts in Diliman where he studied under the tutelage of such Philippine art stalwarts as Roberto Feleo and Roberto Chabet. After finishing his Bachelor of Fine Arts degree in Painting, de Pio worked as a graphic artist and illustrator at the UP NISMED, the AMA Computer University head office, and Petplan, later teaching at the De La Salle–College of Saint Benilde School of Design and the Arts as well as at Xavier School (on top of duties as a graphic designer).

According to Icons of Rock, de Pio's artworks "offer unique insights into the human condition in a narrative of forms and color that breathe life into thoughts, concepts and emotions from which emerge a striking realism". De Pio uses different kinds of medium, although most of his works have been in oil, acrylic, pastel and charcoal.

De Pio was once an artist for Manila's FormaFuego Artist Space. He currently maintains a studio, Prometheus Atelier, in Quezon City. Recently he also taught at FEATI University's fine arts department and volunteered as a managing editor for the emerging art e-zine diskurso art magazine and principal photographer for the YouTube Diskurso Art Magazine channel.

== Achievements ==
Competition	Year	Award
1st Post and Lintel On-the-Spot Portrait Sketching Contest	1997	Grand Prize
27th Shell National Students Art Competition	1994	Honorable Mention
28th Shell National Students Art Competition	1995	Honorable Mention

== Art exhibitions ==
=== Group exhibitions ===
Title	Year	Location
Alay Kay Ama	1995	Liongoren Gallery, SM Megamall, Mandaluyong
Topak, all in the mind	2011	University of the Philippines Vargas Museum, Quezon City
Arts for Generation	2013	Greenfield District in Mandaluyong
Legends and Villains 2 (touring exhibit)	2014	SM Malls (SM City North Edsa, SM Aura Premier, SM Mall of Asia, SM Megamall, and The Podium)
Sining Saysay: Philippine History in Art	2015	Gateway Tower Mall, Quezon City

=== Solo exhibition ===
Personification was the title of de Pio's first solo art exhibition, held at Galerie Astra and later at The Room Upstairs in Makati City in January 2007.

== See also ==
- Vincent de Pio
