= Emmanuel Garibay =

Filipino painter (born 1962)

- Born: Emmanuel Robles Garibay; November 17, 1962 (age 63); Kidapawan, Cotabato, Philippines
- Other name: Manny Garibay
- Education: University of the Philippines Los Baños (BA, 1984); University of the Philippines Diliman (BFA, 1990); Union Theological Seminary, Cavite (MA in Divinity, 1995)
- Known for: Painting
- Movement: Social realism
- Awards: Thirteen Artists Award (2000)

Emmanuel Robles Garibay (born November 17, 1962) is a Filipino painter known for expressionist figurative paintings of ordinary people that carry social, political, and religious commentary. He received the Cultural Center of the Philippines' Thirteen Artists Award in 2000 and has exhibited in Asia, Europe, Australia, and the United States.

== Early life and education ==
Garibay was born on November 17, 1962, in Kidapawan, North Cotabato, the son of a Methodist pastor and a mother who worked in the city engineer's office. He grew up in Davao. He earned a Bachelor of Arts in sociology from the University of the Philippines Los Baños in 1984 and a Bachelor of Fine Arts from the University of the Philippines Diliman in 1990, and later a master's degree in divinity from Union Theological Seminary in Cavite.

== Career ==
In the mid-1980s Garibay was involved with Artista ng Bayan ("People's Artists"), a group of activist artists. His classmate Elmer Borlongan later recalled that Garibay asked him to help finish a mural for the funeral procession of the student leader Lean Alejandro. In the 1990s he contributed to works by Sanggawa, a Manila mural collective whose members included Borlongan and Joy Mallari. He took part in its 1995 series Vox Populi Vox Dei, and a Sanggawa work on which he is credited, Palo-sebo, is in the collection of the Queensland Art Gallery. He is also a member of the Cavite artists' collective Anting-Anting. With the group he painted Perahu Kamalayan (2004), an outdoor mural in Kuala Lumpur made with the Malaysian collective Matahati, and Eternal Damn Nation (2010), a mural on the 2010 elections.

He held his first solo exhibition in 1993, showing oil paintings, his preferred medium. Early in his career he won a juror's choice award and an Art Association of the Philippines certificate of merit; the sculptor Ramon Orlina and his wife, Lay Ann, bought the winning painting and later two more of his works. In 1994 he won first prize in painting at the Art Association of the Philippines annual competition and the Diwa ng Sining award of the National Commission for Culture and the Arts.

In 2000 he was one of the 13 recipients of the Thirteen Artists Award, and won second place for painting at the II Bienal del Baloncesto en Bellas Artes in Madrid. The same year he held the two-person show Kasama with Wilfredo Alicdan in Hong Kong. Reviewing it in the South China Morning Post, Amanda Watson called his paintings intense and socially committed works of social realism, in contrast with Alicdan's simpler scenes, but noted that both artists painted people and the human condition.

He has since held solo exhibitions in the Netherlands, Sweden, Australia, Germany, Hong Kong, Israel, and Indonesia. His solo shows of the next few years included Crux at the Ayala Museum and Pabaon at the Philippine Embassy in Washington, D.C. (both 2007), and Puno't Dulo at Art Verite Gallery in Bonifacio Global City (2008). As the 2010–11 artist in residence at the Overseas Ministries Study Center in New Haven, Connecticut, he showed Faith, Institution, Society, and History at the Gallery of Sacred Arts of the Yale Institute of Sacred Music from November 2010 to January 2011. His work was also included in Charis, a touring exhibition that traveled to venues in North America through 2012.

In 2013 the Vargas Museum at the University of the Philippines Diliman mounted Walang Sinasanto (roughly, "Nothing Is Held Sacred"), a retrospective that ran from February 13 to March 15. The exhibition title, the museum wrote, could denote a loss of sanctity, a challenge to authority and hierarchy, or a condition of social and moral decadence, and the paintings addressed folk Christianity, hybridity, and notions of reverence and devotion. In the catalogue essay, Patrick D. Flores wrote that Garibay grappled with the phrase "with his usual ponderous elaborations, painting after painting". Reviewing the show for Rappler, Rina Angela Corpus described the paintings as parables by "a storyteller of satire". His later group exhibitions include HeARTbeats (2017), drawn from the collection of the cardiologist Romeo P. Ariniego, and Orasyon: Dasal ng Pamilyang Pilipino (2023) at the UST Museum.

Garibay has headed a number of art and cultural organizations since his student years. From 2006 to 2008 he led Tutok Karapatan, a group of artists for human rights, and in 2008 he organized Kritikal Katoliko, an art festival in Quezon City on the impact of religion on Philippine society. He later led Project Bakawan, an environmental arts festival at the University of the Philippines Diliman (2013–2015), and the first three editions of the Paghilom Arts Festival in Cavite (2016–2020). He initiated Paghilom with his children Alee, Nina, and Bam, who are also artists. He chairs the Artletics Foundation, a non-stock, non-profit organization that trains young artists through art education, and has served as president of the Asian Christian Art Association.

== Style ==
Garibay paints in an expressionist figurative style, mostly depicting ordinary people in scenes of political, religious, and social complexity. In her review, Corpus described his work as "vigorously expressionist and impasto-filled", often surreal as well as social realist.

== Awards ==
- 1994 – First prize, painting category, Art Association of the Philippines Annual
- 1994 – Diwa ng Sining Award, National Commission for Culture and the Arts
- 2000 – Thirteen Artists Award, Cultural Center of the Philippines
- 2000 – Second place, painting category, II Bienal del Baloncesto en Bellas Artes, Madrid
