= Joy Mallari =

Filipino painter (born 1966)

- Born: 1966 (age 59–60); Philippines

Joy Mallari (born 1966) is a contemporary Filipino painter and visual artist.

Mallari is known for a visual style similar to the contemporary Filipino figurative expressionism common among members of the Grupong Salimpusa and Sanggawa art movements, but distinguished by a narrative approach which one critic has described as exploring "the linkages between literature and art" - an approach which she attributes to her exposure to the pre-digital animation industry during her developmental years as an artist.

She is also known for exploring themes of identity and marginalization in Philippine society.

The children's book "Doll Eyes", which she co-created with writer Eline Santos, won the National Children's Book Award in 2011.

== Education and influences ==
=== Early influences ===
Mallari cites her childhood years during the Philippines' Martial Law Period and the tumultuous period following the removal of the Marcos administration as formative experiences which had given her a need to engage and participate in society through her art by the time she started taking up her bachelor's degree at University of the Philippines Diliman's College of Fine Arts.

At UP, Mallari became part of Grupong Salingpusa, a group of young student artists which would later become significant voices in the Philippine contemporary art movement, including such figures as Elmer Borlongan, Karen Flores and Manny Garibay.

She also became part of Artista ng Bayan (ABAY), a volunteer group that practiced social activism by coming up with the murals and effigies which were used in street rallies.

A subset of Grupong Salingpusa, consisting of Mallari, Borlongan, Flores, Mark Justiniani, and Federico Slevert, later came together to form the Sanggawa Art Collective in 1994.

=== Animation influence ===
The death of her mother forced Mallari to take a leave of absence from UP in order to work full-time and support her family. Borlongan referred her to a newly opened animation company, where she found herself working on background animation alongside early pioneers in the Philippine animation industry, and some of the last generation of Philippine billboard artists. Mallari would later cite this period as an important learning experience, with the influence of animation resurfacing in her later works.

=== Expatriate period and return to the Philippines ===
In the late '90s, Mallari moved to Los Angeles temporarily, living there for eight years before she returned to the Philippines in 2006.

According to Mallari, this expatriate period heightened her awareness race politics and the underrepresentation of minorities in the arts. Upon returning to the Philippines, Mallari became based in Parañaque City, on the southern part of the Philippines' National Capital Region.

== Shows and significant works ==
=== Shows ===
Mallari's works have been featured in exhibitions all over the world, including Manila, Los Angeles, Denmark, Mexico, Japan, Australia, Singapore and Malaysia.

Notable Solo Exhibitions include:

- "Rekwerdo" in 2008 at Sitio Remedios in Ilocos Norte and
- "Perennial", also in 2008, at Art Verite in Taguig.
- "Doll Eyes" in 2010 at the UP Vargas Museum
- "Scribe" in 2014 at Secret Fresh gallery at the Ronac Art Center in San Juan City.
