= Island groups of the Philippines =

Geographical divisions of the Philippines

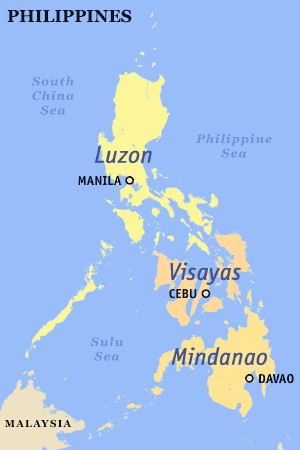
The Philippines is divided into three island groups: Luzon, the Visayas, and Mindanao.

The Philippines is divided into three major island groups: Luzon, the Visayas, and Mindanao. Luzon and Mindanao archipelagoes are both named after the largest island in their respective groups, while the Visayas (also referred to as the Visayan Islands) is an archipelago of roughly similar-sized islands.

== Administrative divisions ==
The islands of the Philippines are organized into three distinct island groups according to regions:

- Luzon comprises 8 regions: I to III, IV-A, V, NCR, CAR, and Mimaropa.
- The Visayas comprises 4 regions: VI to VIII and NIR
- Mindanao comprises 6 regions: IX to XIII, and BARMM.

If a province is reassigned into a new region, it may also be reassigned to a new island group, as is the case with Palawan, when it was temporarily assigned from Mimaropa to Western Visayas and thus temporarily was considered part of the Visayas.

The island groups themselves do not have governments of their own, but are instead divided into provinces, cities, municipalities and barangays, which do have their own local governments. The island groups are used for statistical convenience and in some cases, there are national government agencies that have created positions that cover the island groups such as the Assistant Secretary for Regional Operations in Mindanao in the Department of Public Works and Highways (DPWH) or the Assistant Secretary for Luzon Affairs in the Department of Social Welfare and Development (DSWD).

Although the island groups do not have local governments, hence capitals, certain cities have become the political, economic and cultural centers of the island groups. Manila is the national capital and is the de facto capital of Luzon, though neighboring Quezon City, a former capital, has more inhabitants than Manila. Cebu, on the province and island of the same name, is the chief city of the Visayas. Mindanao's main city is Davao, towards its southeast.

Group	Largest city	Population		±% p.a.	Area		Density	
		1 May 2020	1 May 2010		km^{2}	sq mi	/km^{2}	/sq mi
Luzon	Quezon City	62,196,942	52,362,999	1.74%	125,863	48,596	494	1,280
Visayas	Cebu	20,583,861	18,003,940	1.35%	71,503	27,607	288	746
Mindanao	Davao	26,252,442	21,968,174	1.80%	104,530	40,360	251	650
Total		109,033,245	92,335,113	1.68%	301,896	116,563	361	935

== Islands ==
Luzon	Visayas	Mindanao
1. Luzon; 2. Palawan Island; 3. Mindoro; 4. Masbate Island; 5. Cagraray; 6. Catanduanes; 7. Marinduque; 8. Romblon Island; 9. Polillo Islands; 10. Burias Island; 11. Ticao Island; 12. Tablas Island; 13. Sibuyan Island; 14. Busuanga Island; 15. Culion Island; 16. Coron Island; 17. Balabac Island; 18. Babuyan Group of Islands; 19. Batanes; 20. Calamian Group of Islands; 21. Cuyo Islands; 22. Lubang Islands; 23. Kalayaan Group of Islands	1. Cebu; 2. Panay; 3. Negros Island; 4. Bohol; 5. Samar; 6. Leyte; 7. Guimaras; 8. Siquijor; 9. Biliran; 10. Bantayan Island; 11. Camotes Islands; 12. Boracay; 13. Semirara Group of Islands; 14. Islas de Gigantes; 15. Panaon Island; 16. Limasawa	1. Mindanao; 2. Camiguin; 3. Dinagat Island; 4. Bucas Grande; 5. Samal; 6. Sarangani Islands; 7. Siargao; 8. Sulu Archipelago (includes Basilan, Jolo, Tawi-Tawi, Pata, Sanga-Sanga, Mapun, and Turtle Islands)

== See also ==
- Geography of the Philippines
- List of Islands of the Philippines
- Luzviminda
