= Mikel Parial =

Mikel Parial (born September 29, 1972) is a Filipino painter, photographer, and printmaker. He has an older sister named Kristine. Parial currently resides in Calabarzon, Philippines.

== Career ==
Parial was born in 1972 to acclaimed Filipino artist Mario Parial and his wife Carina Claro. He won in the Printmaking Category of the annual AAP competition in the 1990s, and has exhibited with his father, Mario, on numerous occasions. Most notably, the father-son pair exhibited in the Philippine Centre Gallery in New York back in 1997. The pair also teamed up in 2004 for a printmaking exhibit at the Cultural Centre of the Philippines. "While Mikel, the son, busies himself with imbibing the rigors and discipline of the craft, the elder Parial, Mario, continues to break new printing grounds," said Sol Jose Vanzi of Philippine Headline News Online. Both events were curated by Professor Ruben D.F. Defeo.

Parial has also participated in different group exhibits, like forte at the Pinto Art Gallery in 2013, and has also done solo exhibits at the Kaida Gallery in 2008.

== Collaborations ==
While Mikel's father, Mario, remained his closest collaborator until the latter's death in 2013, the younger Parial has maintained several long-term collaborations with other artists, such as Rolly Acuna, Manny Garibay, Erwin Leano, Neil Manalo, Ferdie Montemayor, Andy and Jim Orencio, Tammy Tan.

== See also ==
- Mario Parial
- List of Filipino painters
