= Fatima Baquiran =

Filipino painter

Fatima Antonio Baquiran
- Born: 8 March 1971 (age 55)
- Occupation: Painter
- Parent: Angelito Antonio, Norma Belleza

Fatima Antonio Baquiran (born March 8, 1971) is a Filipino painter best known for her floral still lifes using an abundance of impastoed colors with an Impressionist finish.

== Early life ==
Born to a family of artists, Baquiran is the daughter of renowned Filipino painters Angelito Antonio and Norma Belleza and sister to painter Emil Antonio and well-known contemporary artist Marcel Antonio. She was a Fine Arts student majoring in Interior Design at the University of Santo Tomas but later shifted to Painting, building a full-time career in the latter field after her graduation.

== Works ==
Most of Baquiran's works are still lifes, particularly featuring a bouquet of flowers in a jar or vase placed on a table juxtaposed with varying elements such as tabletops, windows, and blankets. In an interview she stated that this obsession was inspired by her mother's green thumb.

Baquiran's painting style has been described as a cross between some facets of her favorite European artists Claude Monet's and Rembrandt's styles. Her flowers and objects are rendered with vibrant pigments led by her unique blend of warms and cools. Baquiran, unlike other Filipino artists using the impasto impressionistic technique, works mostly with acrylic paints to produce her pieces.

=== Selected series and individual works ===
- A Jar of Flowers series (acrylic on canvas)
- A Jar of Flower series (oil on canvas)
- Still Life series (acrylic on canvas)
- Basket of Flowers series (acrylic on canvas)
- Floral Series (acrylic on canvas)
- A Jar of Roses series (acrylic on canvas)
- Center Table
- Flowers and Watermelons
- Kettle & A Glass of Flowers
- Assorted Fruits series
- Orange
- Guava
- Mixed Flowers on A Green Basket
- Lady Orchid

== Exhibits ==
Baquiran has exhibited in numerous galleries, group exhibitions, and campaigns at:

- Art Circle Gallery
- Philippine Tuberculosis Society, Inc. – Christmas Seals Exhibit, 2013
- Artspace, Glorietta – “A Confluence of Diverging Views from Six Filipino Artists”
- E-Gallery at The Shops, Serendra, The Fort, Taguig – “Echoes”

== See also ==
- Angelito Antonio
- Norma Belleza
- Marcel Antonio
