= Marcel Antonio =

Filipino painter

- Antonio in his studio, 2010
- Born: June 28, 1965 (age 60); Manila, Philippines
- Occupation: Artist

Antonio's Maiden with Flowers, oil on canvas, 2000

Marcel Antonio (born June 28, 1965) is a Filipino painter. Considered one of the most promising young talents in Philippine contemporary art while still attending the University of the Philippines' College of Fine Arts in the late 1980s, he launched a solo show and thereafter dropped out of the college to continue to produce collections of his distinct narrative as well as pseudo-narrative figurative paintings influenced by modernism and 1980s postmodernism. Since then, Antonio produced enough sold-out works to be quickly counted as one of the Philippines' young painters most proficient in the magic realist sort of post-expressionism in the country.

After leaving college to focus on his developing professional career, Antonio became a sought-after artist among collectors in the Manila art market. Sustained demand contributed to his success in mainstream galleries, with multiple sold-out exhibitions organized by his dealers.

Antonio's works involve a clear post-expressionism with mysterious themes, often utilizing fabular images that combine myth with reality, creating stories behind his paintings that has continued to capture Manila's mainstream gallery-goers' attention with their deep sense of play.

In the Philippines, Antonio has exhibited in major galleries including Galleria Duemila, The Drawing Room, Gallery BIG, Galleria Quattrocento (his recurring mother gallery), and Altro Mondo Arte Contemporanea, where his following has included local and international collectors. He has also exhibited in Berlin, Australia, and Singapore.

== Life and work ==
Antonio is the son of Filipino painters Angelito Antonio and Norma Belleza and brother to painters Emil Antonio and Fatima Baquiran.

While still a sophomore in the University of the Philippines College of Fine Arts, Antonio emerged as one of the school's "most promising" art students when he launched a solo exhibition. With that show, he was quickly catapulted into the Manila market and an inviting professional career in art, and Antonio had to deal with the pressures of his studies while being enthused by already-burgeoning requests coming from dealers. He chose to drop out and start an art career.

By the time Antonio approached his forties in the late 1990s he had already gone through a number of transitions in search of a signature art, all within the terms of figuration, human figuration centrally. He has in his art quoted mannerisms from both of his parents' works. In an interview, Antonio intimated: "I remember the times when my father would teach me how to draw a muscled man. I guess my passion for figures and storytelling comes from that."

Antonio's art creation is often inspired by various contemporary "mythologies", with the artist articulately stressing that his concept of mythology goes beyond the common Greek and Roman notion. He states: "Myth can be anything, just like what Joseph Campbell enunciated in The Power of Myth, where he discussed comparative mythology and the continuing role of myth in human society."

=== On originality, quoting and the appropriation of themes and images ===
On the issue of originality in art and quoting/appropriating, Antonio has said, "My father used to tell me to not be afraid to copy, as it is the safest way to study. Even the masters did it. . . . Originality is a 19th-century idea that just won't die when right now there's really nothing that can be deemed totally original. Striving for originality in art is delusional. You can only do so much."

=== "Blue funk erotica" and The Romantic Lie show ===
Blue funk erotica or trance erotica was the art-critical term introduced by Filipino poet, art critic and painter V.I.S. de Veyra in a 2010 blog essay titled "Blue Funk'd Silent Stories" to describe Antonio's art. The blog essay reviewed the achievements of the Filipino painter from his earlier years on to his then-latest 2010 show. The phrase tag, which the critic-painter posited in his art and culture blog site A Party-Crashing Angle, instigated a dialogue between the artist and the critic, which culminated in a late 2011 series of paintings by Antonio. Antonio and de Veyra decided to collaborate on an early 2012 show using Antonio's new series, with the poet supplying 14 new poems for the show catalogue. De Veyra, being also a painter who once studied in the same fine arts college as Antonio, also collaborated with Antonio on a five-painting series of shaped canvases for the show. The two titled the show "The Romantic Lie: Desire, Ennui, Anxiety".

De Veyra described Antonio's art as a face- and gestures-leaning figurative narrative or quasi-narrative art that avoids both the "folk happiness" and the "expressionism" of past and recent Philippine figurative art. Then de Veyra tagged Antonio's body of works as of a "blue funk erotica" or "trance erotica" embracing the melancholic or otherwise the vexed expression. He touted this kind of painting as the subtle sort of fetish erotica that relies on the drama of melancholia, instead of on pure eroticism, as the secret springboard for the production of erotic imagining. Trance painting is deemed by de Veyra to have been culled from the art of Blue Period Picasso and Diego Velázquez, as much as from Raphael, Degas, Chagall, Giorgio de Chirico, Nobuyoshi Araki, and the "defamiliarization" technique of the Russian Formalists.

In November 2014, Antonio enjoined the then-freelancing critic de Veyra, along with painter Simkin de Pio, to launch diskurso art magazine, an online art magazine-cum-blog for which he would act as publisher, with de Veyra as the chief writer and editor.

== Selected shows ==
Solo shows

- Cultural Center of the Philippines
- Brix Gallery, Manila
- Liongoren Art Gallery, Manila
- "Recent Artworks", The Drawing Room, Manila (June 3–21, 2000)
- "Langue et Parole", West Gallery, SM Megamall, Mandaluyong (July 13–25, 2000)
- "Dialogo", The Drawing Room, Manila
- "Les Petites Histoires", Ad Infinitum Galleries, Manila
- "Märchen", Jasmine Fine Arts, Singapore
- "Sturm und Drang", Galleria Quattrocento, Makati (September 26 - October 9, 2009)
- Glorietta Art Center, Makati (July, 2010)
- "The Romantic Lie: Desire, Ennui, Anxiety", Water Dragon Gallery, Yuchengco Museum, Makati (February 2012)

Selected group exhibitions

- Raab Galleries, West Berlin, Germany
- Art Exchange, Australia
- Alliance Française de Manille
- Pinaglabanan Art Galleries, Manila
