= Angelito Antonio =

Filipino painter (1939–2025)

Angelito 'Mang Lito' Antonio
- Born: Angelito Antonio; February 3, 1939; Malolos, Bulacan, Commonwealth of the Philippines
- Died: September 24, 2025 (aged 86)
- Education: University of Santo Tomas
- Known for: Painting
- Family: Fatima Baquiran (Daughter), Norma Belleza (Wife), Marcel Antonio (son), Emil Antonio (son)

Angelito "Mang Lito" Antonio (February 3, 1939 – September 24, 2025) was a Filipino painter. He studied at the University of Santo Tomas (UST) and obtained his bachelor's degree in Fine Arts in 1963, then went on to teach at the same university for many years. He is considered one of the most influential figures of the modern art movement in the Philippines.

== Life and career ==
Antonio was born in Malolos, Bulacan on February 3, 1939. He studied art at the University of Santo Tomas, he had an art career that spanned half a century. Some well-known painters, such as Manansala and Galo Ocampo, were his teachers at the university. His colleagues included National Artist Ang Kiukok, Antonio Austria, Danilo Dalena, Mario Parial, Jaime de Guzman, and Norma Belleza, whom he married. More than twenty local and international awards were awarded to him, including the Grand Prize (1964) and Third Prize (1963) on AAP's Annual art competition. He was also a member of Art Association of the Philippines and the Saturday Group of Artists.

In 1977, Antonio first showed his works at the Luz gallery, Included in this exhibit were four sets of drawing with three to four paintings per set and 12 monochromatic black and white paintings. Antonio's work was displayed at numerous exhibits hosted in the Philippines and outside of them, particularly in New York and Saigon. Antonio's style is influenced by Picasso. He had experimented greatly with colors to delineate his figures. His works' themes are taken extensively from folk art.

Antonio's later works saw him moving toward abstraction, or a mix of the abstract and the figurative. He has been labeled both a modernist and an expressionist.

He mentored third-generation modernists such as Mario de Rivera and Raul Isidro at the University of Santo Tomas College of Fine Arts and Design.

Antonio was married to Norma Belleza, with whom he had three children, Marcel, Emil, and Fatima, who also went on to become painters. He died on September 24, 2025, at the age of 86 from septic shock related to ventilator-associated pneumonia.

== Exhibitions ==
Some exhibitions entered by Antonio include:

- "La Musique", a 2013 exhibition in Galerie Stephanie at Libis.
- "Pares-Pares", a group show at Liongoren Gallery.
- A 2013 exhibition at Liongoren Gallery.

== Awards ==
In the Shell National Students Art Competition:

- The Beginning is Green, in 1958, third prize
- Kristo (Christ), in 1963, second prize
- Mag-iisda (Fish Seller), in 1963, certificate of merit

From the Art Association of the Philippines:

- Mananahi (Seamstress), in 1962, third prize
- Deposition, in 1963, second prize
- He, in 1969, honorable mention
- Oracion (Evening Prayer), in 1970, first prize
- Procession, 1970, special award
- Pangarap sa Buhay, in 1972, major award

Other competitions:

- In the Travellers Life art competition, 1961, first prize
- In the University of Santo Tomas 300th Anniversary, 1962, first prize
- In the Travellers Art competition, in 1963, second prize
- In the Philippine Airlines art contest, 1968, first prize

Other awards:

- Thirteen Artist Award from the CCP in 1970
- Patnubay ng Sining at Kalinangan Award by the City of Manila in 1984

== Related to ==
- Norma Belleza
- Marcel Antonio
- Fatima Baquiran

== See also ==
- Vicente Manansala
- Abstract Art
- Modernism
- University of Santo Tomas
