= CJ Tañedo =

Filipino contemporary painter (born 1979)

- Born: Caesar Joseph Tañedo; April 9, 1979 (age 46); Makati, Philippines
- Occupation: Painter

Caesar Joseph Tañedo (born April 9, 1979) is a contemporary painter in the Philippine art scene. He came from a family with an artistic background. He won several awards during and after college. He also had many group and solo exhibits inside and outside the country.

== Education ==
CJ Tañedo studied his primary education in St. Joseph's College of Quezon City and he studied high school in Aquinas School San Juan, where he was given "Artist of the Year" (1995–1996) award and he was also a "Deportment Awardee". He earned a bachelor's degree in fine arts major in painting from University of Santo Tomas, where he started his painting career. The university is known for its traditional/conservative way of teaching art to students. Tañedo learned the basics of painting in university, and then researched techniques to improve his works.

== Career ==
Tañedo was a Shell Art Competition finalist when in his second year as a student, and in his third year won 2nd place in A.A.P. on the spot painting competition and an honorable mention in T.U.P. on the spot contest. During the same year (1999), he was again a Shell finalist and was also awarded a prize by Metrobank Young Painters Annual and Nokia Art Awards Philippines. In the following year, he won a place in Nokia Art Awards in Seoul, Korea, got 3rd Place in Shell Art competition, 2nd Place in A.A.P. annual competition (Painting Category) and received several awards from UST.

After graduating he won several awards. He also worked part-time in their design company as a consultant of accessories in interior designing and was a part owner of some gallery in Tomas Morato, Quezon City.

== Artworks ==
CJ Tañedo is one of the few painters in the Philippines who brought the visual techniques of the renaissance art masters into the modern scene of the 20th century. His artworks are mixtures of different discipline in traditional painting. The paintings made by him are mostly defined as dark and creepy. His art evolves as his interests change and as it matures over the time. Realism is his key factor in his artworks but he is also a fan of impressionism, expressionism and symbolism. His style, though, is figurative art. He prefer the use of oil paint and acrylic in painting. He uses the process of Flemish technique in his artworks and he adopts different ways on how to dry the layers of his painting quickly. His way of painting is putting many layers of paint in his artworks. His subjects varies on his different moods and events.

== Exhibitions ==
=== Solo exhibits ===
2003 :

- MARCH "Trudging through the ashes." at Kulay Diwa Art Galleries. White gallery

2004 :

- MAY "Raindrops & Sunshowers." at BOSTON Gallery, main gallery

2005 :

- APRIL "Sanctuaries." at BOSTON Gallery, main gallery
- JUNE "Under my Umbrella" at the Big & Small art gallery SM Megamall

2006 :

- NOVEMBER ‘Water & dry-lands’ at BOSTON Gallery, upper gallery

2009 :

- JULY ‘Compulsion’ at Tala Gallery

=== Selected group exhibits ===
- E M O Gabuco, Tañedo, Zamora @ BOSTON Gallery, Boston St. Cubao Q.C. 26 May – 16 June 2001
- ALAY 5 @ BOSTON Gallery, Boston St. Cubao Q.C. 8 December 2001 – 11 January 2002
- Under Bleeding Rain And Sky Crystal Clear, Gabuco, Roxas, Tañedo, Zamora @ BOSTON Gallery 12 February – 4 March 2002.
- Recent works @ Kulay Diwa Art Galleries first group show since its reopening. 11 August – 11 September 2002
- ALAY 6 @ BOSTON Gallery, December 2002—January 2003
- ONE – Ronald Caringal, Fernando Escora, Mark Magistrado, Oliver Ramos, Ivan Roxas, Jerson Samson, CJ Tañedo@ The Cubicle Art Gallery, Pasig January – February 2003
- One day I shut out the world – CJ Tañedo & Martin Sacramento @ BOSTON Gallery 29 March – 27 April 2003
- Ignorance is bliss – Christopher Zamora, Carlo Gabuco, CJ Tañedo @ Kulay Diwa Art Galleries, White Gallery 20 April – 15 May 2003
- Dog / God – young thomasian artist circle: Barrioquinto, Borsoto, Calubayan, Lindslee, Magistrado, Pacena, Roxas, CJ Tañedo, Valenzuela Cultural Center of the Philippines Bulwagang Juan Luna (Main Gallery) 10 February – 20 March 2005
- UST Museum of Arts and Sciences Main Gallery January 10 – 28, 2005. (traveling exhibit)
- Charming man – Kiko Escora, Ivan Roxas, Jethro Jocson, CJ añedo @ Arias Makati, August 2005
- Through the palette's eye -Anita Magsaysay-Ho, Bencab, Malang, Pacita Abad, Manuel Baldemor, Steve Santos, Soler Santos, Mark Justiniani, Marcel Antonio, Elmer Borlongan, Jose Santos III, Alfredo Esquillo jr, Kiko Eskora, Hermes Allegre, Christian Tamondong, Rodel Tapaya, CJ Tañedo, Romeo Forbes, Yvees Belen and Bing Samonte @ Crucible Gallery SM Megamall bldg.a, Mandaluyong, September 13–18, 2005
- i. of disappointment – Andres Barrioquinto, Ivan Roxas, Lawrence Borsoto, & CJ Tañedo @ Blanc Gallery, April 2007.
- Peculiar People – Andres Barrioquinto, Jon Jaylo, CJ Tañedo @ Tintero Art and Design Studio Oct 30-Nov 30 2007
- Babylon Zoo – James Almario & CJ Tañedo, a yearly project exhibit at different galleries since 2006 onwards
- Uiwang International Placard Art Festival 2007 – Korea
- ENEMY – Art Center SM Megamal Nov 2010
- Disposable Hero – 2011, Atro Mondo Gallery, Green Belt 5, Makati

== Awards/Citations received ==
2003 :

- Top 50 Finalist – Philip Morris Group of Companies Philippine Art Awards

2001 :

- Finalist – Metrobank Young Painter's Annual Competition

2000 :

- Merit Award; Outstanding Artistic Expression – Nokia Art Awards, Seoul, Korea
- Juror's Choice (Top 5) – Nokia Art Awards Philippines
- 2nd place – A.A.P. Annual Competition (Painting Category)
- 3rd place – Shell National Student's Arts Competition
- U.S.T. / PLDT Painting Competition
- U.S.T. ‘on the spot’ Painting Competition
- U.S.T. Most Out Standing Student Award

1999 :

- 2nd place – A.A.P. Annual Competition (Representational Category)
- T.U.P. ‘on the spot’ contest - Honorable Mention
- Metrobank Young Painters’ Annual
- Finalist – SHELL National Student's Arts Competition
- NOKIA Art Awards Philippines

1998 :

- Finalist – SHELL National Student's Arts Competition

1996 : (High School)

- Artist of the Year 1995–1996, Aquinas School
- Deportment Award
