= Manuel Baldemor =

Filipino artist (born 1947)

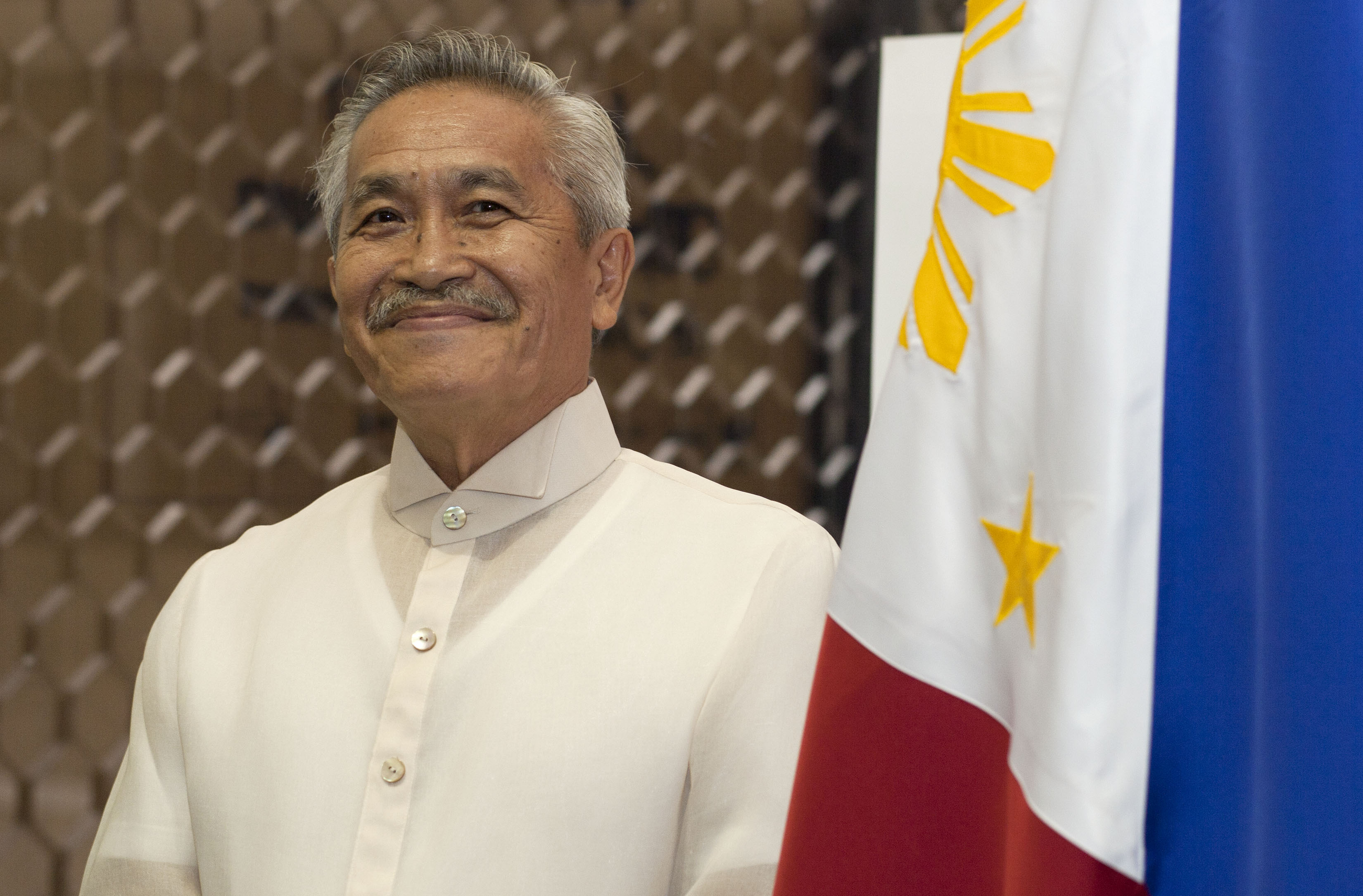
- Born: Manuel D. Baldemor; March 26, 1947 (age 79); Paete, Laguna, Philippines
- Known for: Painting

Manuel Baldemor is a Filipino painter, sculptor, printmaker, writer and book illustrator. He was born on March 26, 1947, in Paete, Laguna, Philippines.

He is best known for his paintings on various media that depict scenes in simplified geometric forms with a folk art character. Most of his subjects in art are his hometown, its people, their everyday activities, and their celebrations.

His works are known not only in the Philippines but also in other countries. He is an artist-in-residence in Chile, Estonia, France, Israel, Japan, Singapore, Switzerland and Portugal. His works is known internationally because UNICEF is reproducing his works as greeting cards that are distributed worldwide.

== Early career and education ==
Manuel Baldemor studied at the University of Santo Tomas College of Architecture and Fine Arts (CAFA), which later became the College of Architecture and the College of Fine Arts and Design. While a student, he worked with Mabini artists to support himself financially. His classmates often sought his help with their academic art plates, recognizing his distinctive skill and style.

During his stay, he was influenced by modernist principles introduced by National Artist Victorio Edades. Baldemor was later featured in exhibitions tracing the roots of modern art in the Philippines, alongside other prominent artists shaped by Edades’ legacy.

In his senior year, he worked as a layout artist an editorial cartoonist for the Philippine Graphic. This started his career in publication.

== Career ==
His career started as a painter when he depicted the beauty of his hometown Paete, Laguna through pen-and ink. His mural work "Paete I" won the grand prize in the Art Association of the Philippines Art Competition and Exhibition in 1972. The next year, his mural work "Paete II" won the same prize. His consecutive wins paved the way for him to become a representative of the Philippines for the XIV International Art Exhibition in Paris in 1973. The art critic, Leonides Benesa, hails him as "The Folk Artist".

In the 1970s he developed his own brand of art that had fused his rural memories. He created several works depicting the Philippine ideal through Folk Modernist treatment. His first exhibit "The Graphic of Manuel D. Baldemor" at the Hidalgo Gallery in 1972 marked the debut of his career.

He won his third gold prize for the annual Art Association of the Philippines competition for his fine prints in 1983. He experimented with other media such as watercolour, acrylic, tempera, oil-on-canvas, woodcut, ceramics, glass, grass paper, and fine prints.

Apart from his depictions of everyday life, Baldemor has ventured into spiritually themed art. His work "Moments with Christ" is noted for invoking a sense of divine inspiration and adds another dimension to his repertoire.

Rosalinda Orosa, an art connoisseur and columnist, called him "The Chronicle of the Motherland" for depicting the beauty of all the places of the Philippines. In 1992, the Cultural Center of the Philippines awarded him as one of the Thirteen Artist Awardees as recognition for his contributions to the country.

He garnered travel grants as artist-in-residence in France, England, Switzerland, Russia, Spain, Portugal, and Scandinavia in Europe; United States, Mexico, and Chile in the Americas; Iran, Israel, and Egypt in the Middle East; South Korea, India, Malaysia, and China in Asia. Each country he visited became a topic and subject for his art. He became known as an International Artist and also the Most Travelled Artist for traveling to more than 50 countries.

In 1995, he marked his 25th anniversary as an artist with an exhibit at the Artists’ Corner in SM Megamall, featuring two works: "Sining Bayan", which reflected his Filipino identity, and "The Global Village", which highlighted his international engagements. Ambassadors from countries where he had served as an artist-in-residence attended as guests of honor. In 1998, President Fidel V. Ramos attended the inauguration of his mural "Pasasalamat", now permanently displayed at the United Nations Center in Vienna, Austria. His international recognition continued in 2013 when Ambassador Carlos C. Salinas opened his exhibit Symphony of Colors in Madrid, as part of the Philippines–Spain Friendship Day celebrations, further reflecting the international scope of Baldemor’s artistic career. That same year, he held a one-day exhibit titled Philippine Skyland at UNESCO in Paris, featuring works that depicted the life and culture of the Ifugao people.

He is also a sculptor. In 1982 he won his fourth gold prize for sculpture at the Annual Art Association of the Philippines Competition with his piece "Tribute to the Filipino Farmer," exhibited at the City Gallery in Luneta in 1980, as a tribute to his father, Perfecto S. Baldemor. In 1999, he represented the Philippines at the 3rd Inami International Wooden Sculpture Camp in Toyama Prefecture, Japan, where he produced the monumental "Pamilyang Pilipino," measuring 1m wide by 4m high.

On October 1–14, 1999, he exhibited his 100th show entitled "A Distinctive Milestone" as a painter and sculptor at the Artists’ Corner in SM Megamall. At that time, he was the only artist to exhibit his works a hundred times.

He is also a writer and part of the Writers’ Guild of the Philippines. His poems and essays are featured in leading newspapers and magazines. He was a columnist for culture in two major newspapers. His weekly column entitled "Folio" appeared in the Sunday Times of the Manila Times newspaper in 1992 to 1994. He continued his weekly column in the "Art and Culture Section" of "The Philippines Star" from 1997 to 1999. In 2025, he actively participated in the 51st National Writers Congress of the Writers’ Union of the Philippines (UMPIL), where he designed and donated the handcrafted trophies for the Gawad Pambansang Alagad ni Balagtas literary awards.

He showed his skills as a graphic designer by making souvenir programs for the XI World Congress of Cardiology in 1991, the XXII International Conference on Internal Medicine in 1994, and other commemorative books about the history and cultivation of the Philippines.

In 1980, he was awarded "Gawad Sikap" for Visual Arts for the 400th anniversary of his hometown. Paetenians International Northeast Chapter acknowledged him as the "Paetenian of the Year" in 1985 and one of the "Ten Outstanding Living Paetenians" in 2000. He was also awarded as one of the "Natatanging Buhay na Anak ng Bayan" in the Celebration of Balik-Paete 2004.

He sometimes leads the patronage and affirmation of Paete through his shows such as "Salubong" in Nayong Pilipino in 1978, "The Masters of Paete Exhibit" at the City Gallery, Luneta in 1980, the grand exhibition of "The Paete Phenomenon" at the Cultural Center of the Philippines, the tape-recording of two historical concerts of Band 69 – "Konsyerto ng Pamanang Himig" and "Konsyerto ng Sentenaryo ng Banda" – at the UP Abelardo Hall in 1997, and the "Konsyerto ng Sentenaryo ng Kalayaan ng Bansa" inside the hundred-year Church of Paete, Laguna.

His works are known internationally because UNICEF is reproducing his works as greeting cards that are distributed worldwide He has been noted for painting both the Philippines and the world, capturing local culture while engaging with global themes. Some of his artworks have also been adapted into cross-stitch patterns and featured in exhibitions in Europe, reflecting the versatility and international appeal of his visual style.

In 2009, Baldemor completed a monumental glass mosaic mural titled "People Power", which was installed at the Basilica of St. Thérèse in Lisieux, France. Created in collaboration with French mosaicists Sylvie Henot and François Sand, the work commemorates the 1986 People Power Revolution in the Philippines. The mural is part of the basilica’s permanent collection, symbolizing peace and spiritual solidarity. Its installation marked a rare honor for a Filipino artist in one of France's most significant religious pilgrimage sites.

== Notable works ==
Year	Title and Location
2009	Mosaic at the Basilica of St. Thérèse in Lisieux, France
2007	Commemorative Stamps for Philippines–France Relations (60th anniversary of Diplomatic Ties), Philippine Embassy in Paris, France
1990s–	UNICEF Christmas Cards

== Awards ==
Year	Title and Location
2007	Most Outstanding Alumni of University of Santo Thomas
2004	10th Asian Biennale Bangladesh
1998	Indian Council for Cultural Relations, Delhi, India
1997	Ministry of Arts and Culture, Prague, Czech Republic
1994	Artist-in-residence, Internationale Austausch Ateliers Region Basel, Switzerland
1992	Thirteen Artists Award, Cultural Center of the Philippines
1991	Ministry of Arts and Culture, Cairo, Egypt
1989	First ASEAN Symposium on Aesthetics, Workshop and Exhibition, National Gallery, Kuala Lumpur, Malaysia
1988	Artist-in-residence, Santiago, Chile Artist-in-residence, Miskenot Shaannmin, Jerusalem, Israel USIS, Voluntary Visitors Program, USA
1987	China Exhibition Agency, The People's Republic of China
1985	Ministry of Arts and Culture, Moscow, USSR Leutuvos TSR Kuturas Ministerija, Vilnius, Lithuania
1983	Best Fine Print Award, Art Association of the Philippines
1982	Best Sculpture Award, Art Association of the Philippines
1975	British Council, London Ministry of Arts and Culture, Paris, France
1974	Honorable Mention Award for Painting, AAP
1973	Philippine Representative, XIV Internationale Art Exhibition, Paris, France Grand Prize Award, Art Association of the Philippines

== Solo exhibits ==
Year	Title and Location
2019	"Luzviminda", New York City, USA
2014	"Mosaique" Alliance Francaise, France
2013	"Moments with Christ", SM Megamall Atrium "Symphony of Colors" Centro Cultural Galileo, Madrid, Spain "Philippine Skyland" Salon des Délegués., UNESCO Miollis, Paris, France
2012	"Impressions: An Art Exhibition of Paintings" Vienna International Center, Vienna, Austria "Images of My Homeland and Switzerland" Switzerland
2010	A Cross-Stitch Exhibit, Event Center, SM Megamall
2008	"The Images of the Philippines and Norway" Norway’s Ministry of Culture and Church Affairs, Norway, Iceland
2007	"Somewhere in France" Art Center, SM Megamall "Windows" Atrium, Singapore "Chromatext Reloaded" CCP Main Gallery "The Wonders of China" Galerie Y
2006	Vietnam Fine Art Museum exhibit, Hanoi
2005	Galerie S, Stockholm
1998	"Las Canciones de la Revolucion" Museo Nacional de Antropologia, Madrid, Spain "From the Heart of India" Art Center, SM MegaMall
1997	"A Gift of Nature" Gallery 139, Ayala Alabang, Muntinlupa "Dubrovnik Croatia" Galerie Y, SM MegaMall, Mandaluyong "Czech National Day" Czech Embassy, Manila "Songs of the Revolution" Ayala Museum, Makati City "Prague, The Heart of Europe" Ayala Museum, Makati City "Mula sa Sinisintang Lupa" GSIS Museo ng Sining, GSIS Bldg, Financial Center, Pasay "Philippines Nature's Wonder" Hotel Bayerischen Hof, Munich, Germany "Images of my Native Land" Novomestska Radnice, Prague, Czech Republic "Hymn to my Homeland" Kunst Im Sonnenhof, Bern, Switzerland "Transition" The Crucible Gallery, SM MegaMall, Mandaluyong
1996	"Cultural and Spiritual Homeland" Museo Iloilo, Iloilo City "Quelque Part En France" La Galerie, Alliance Francaise de Manille "Global Village" The Art Center, SM MegaMall, Mandaluyong "Hymn to the Earth" Luz Gallery, Makati City "Discovery" The Country of Tagaytay Highlands, Tagaytay City "Festival of my Hometown" Philippine International Convention Center
1995	"Switzerland Aquarelle" Finale Art Gallery, SM MegaMall, Mandaluyong "Pasko sa Aming Bayan" EDSA Plaza Hotel, Mandaluyong "Graces from the Land" Gen. Luna Gallery, Davao City "Masskara", Bacolod Convention Plaza Hotel, Bacolod City "Sining Bayan" Art Center, SM MegaMall, Mandaluyong "CEBU, The Queen City of the South" SM City, Cebu
1994	"Madonna Filipina" Sculpture Exhibition, Heritage Art Center, Shangri-La Plaza, Mandaluyong "Flowers from the Alps" Galerie Y, SM MegaMall, Mandaluyong "A Piece of Switzerland" Ayala Museum, Makati City "Ein Stuck Schwiz" International Austausch Ateliers Region, Basel, Switzerland
1993	"Maskara ng Buhay" Galerie Y, SM MegaMall, Mandaluyong "Zona Verde" Hotel Intercontinental, Makati City "Philippine Skyworld" Phoenix Gallery, Baguio City "Cogon at Kahoy" Woodcut Prints Exhibition, Ayala Museum, Makati City "Scent of China" Galerie Y, SM MegaMall, Mandaluyong "The Gentle Carabao" West Gallery, SM MegaMall, Mandaluyong "Festival of Colors" Victoria Plaza, Davao City
1992	"Pasko Filipino" Heritage Art Center, SM MegaMall, Mandaluyong "Mirror" Lopez Museum, Pasig "Awit at Kulay" Hotel Nikko Manila Garden, Makati City "Season's Best" Westin Philippine Plaza Hotel, Manila "Recuerdos de Mexico" Ayala Museum, Makati City
1991	"Underneath the Rainbow" Philippines Center, New York City, USA "The Wonders of Egypt II" Egyptian Ambassador's Residence, Makati City "The Wonders of Egypt I" Lopez Museum, Pasig "The Art of Manuel D. Baldemor" National Gallery, Open House, Cairo, Egypt "Ugat ng Sariling Atin" UPLB Gallery, Los Baños, Laguna "Ang Pista sa Nayon" West Gallery, Quezon City "Sa Duyan ng Pagmamahal" Ayala Museum, Makati City "May Isang Bayan sa Dakong Silangan" Cultural Center of the Philippines, Manila "Sa Lambong ng Bahag-hari" Artist's Corner Gallery, Hotel Intercontinental Manila, Makati City
1990	"Munting Bayan sa Salamin" Hotel Nikko Manila Garden, Makati City "Nature's Best" Lopez Museum, Pasig "Sining at Lulturang Kinagisnan" The Luz Gallery, Makati City "Pagdiriwang" Philippine International Convention Center, Manila
1989	"Chile: A Discovery of Colors" The National Museum, Manila
1987	"The Art of Manuel D. Baldemor" Harry Steel Cultural Center, Kiriat Ono, Israel "As I Came Down from Jerusalem" Ayala Museum, Makati City "Munting Bayan" Philippine Center, New York
1986	"Homage to Carlos V. Francisco" Angono Artist's, Angono, Rizal "Recent Works" Lopez Museum, Pasig "Homage to Botong" Ayala Museum, Makati City "American Experience" Thomas Jefferson Cultural Center, Makati City "The Art of Manuel D. Baldemor" International Art Gallery, Beijing, China "Xian Beyond Expectations" Ayala Museum, Makati City
1985	"The Graphic Art of Manuel D. Baldemor" The Friendship House, Moscow, USSR "Manuelis Baldemoras Tapyba Grapika" Lietuvos TSR Dailies Muziejus, Vilnius Lithuania "Folk Vision" The Luz Gallery, Makati City "Pahiyas and the Year of the Carabao" Gallery Genesis, Mandaluyong
1984	"Summertime" Gallery Marguerite, Hyatt Terraces, Baguio City "Baldemor Country" The Luz Gallery, Makati City
1983	"Laguna, the Land and the People" Hidalgo Gallery, makati City "Painting and Sculpture" ELF Arthaus, Parañaque, Metro Manila "Munting Bayan" Ayala Museum, Makati City
1982	"Roots" Greenhills Art Center, San Juan, Metro Manila
1981	"Korean Impressions" Greenhills Art Center, San Juan, Metro Manila "Baldemor's Painting Exhibition" Philippine Embassy, Seoul, Korea "Images of the Homeland" Greenhills Art Center, San Juan, Metro Manila
1980	"Tribute to the Filipino Farmers" (Sculpture) City Gallery, Manila
1978	"Introspective" Print Collections Gallery, Manila "Kay Ganda ng Pilipinas" ABC Galleries, Manila "Muslim Impressions" Hidalgo Gallery, Makati City
1977	The Art of Manuel D. Baldemor" Mainz Rathaus, Mainz, West Germany "Baldemor Paintings" PhilamLife, Iloilo City
1976	"Ceramic Paintings" The Gallery, Hyatt Regency, Manila "Mother and Child" ABC Galleries, Manila "Prints and Drawings" Galeria Burlas, Bacolod City
1975	"Kay Ganda ng Pilipinas" Kilusang Sining Gallery Makati "Recent Paintings" Galeria Burlas, Bacolod City
1974	"Baldemor's Paete" GMTFM Hall, Taguig, Metro Manila "Paete" Second Laguna Development Bank, Paete, Laguna "Paete: Sketchbook of a Filipino Town" Quad Gallery, Makati
1973	"The Art of Manuel D. Baldemor" Hidalgo Gallery, Makati
1972	"The Graphic Art of Manuel D. Baldemor" Hidalgo Gallery, Makati City

== Group exhibits ==
Year	Title and Location
2011	"Edades: From Freedom to Fruition", Cultural Center of the Philippines
2006	"Ode to the Pasig River" Ayala Museum "Through the Palette's Eye" U.P.-Jorge B. Vargas Museum and Filipiniana Research Center
2005	Philippine Exhibit, Stanford Art Spaces, Stanford University "SCAPES: Images of Time and Place" DLSU Museum
1997	Two-Man Show, Albor-Baldemor, Stadt Museum, Düsseldorf, Germany Two-Man Show, Albor-Baldemor, Landesvertretung Thuringen, Bonn, Germany
1996	"The Filipino Masters" Ericsson Telecommunications, Manila Three-Man Show, Albor-Baldemor-Olmedo, Philippine Embassy, Vienna, Italy
1992	Philippine Pavilion, Seville, Spain
1991	"Paete Phenomenon" Cultural Center of the Philippines
1990	Cultural Gallery, Muzium Negara, Kuala Lumpur, Malaysia
1989	First ASEAN Symposium on Aesthetics, Workshop and Exhibition, National Art Gallery, Kuala Lumpur, Malaysia
1988	International Art Festival, Saddam Art Center, Baghdad, Iraq
1987	Metropolitan Museum, Manila
1986	Bienal de la Habana, Cuba
1985	Print Council of Australia, Melbourne Asia World Art Gallery, Taipei, Taiwan
1984	Galerie Taub, Philadelphia
1982	ASEAN Traveling Art Exhibition, Malaysia, Singapore, Thailand, Indonesia, Hong Kong, and Manila
1980	Madurodam Gallery, The Hague, The Netherlands
1977	Wall Panel Gallery, Tehran, Iran
1975	The Philippine Center, New York City, New York, USA
1973	XIV Internationale Art Exhibition, Paris, France
1972	AAP Art Competition and Exhibition, Cultural Center of the Philippines

== Books and publications ==
Year	Title and Contributors
2010	"Manuel D. Baldemor’s European Journey of Discovery"
1996	"Painting the Global Village" with Rosalinda L. Orosa
1993	"Tales of a Rainy Night" with C. Hidalgo "Sabong" with A. Hidalgo
1992-94	Columnist, "Folio", Sunday Times Life Magazine, Philippines
1992	"Philippine Food and Life" with G.C. Fernando
1991	"The Paete Phenomenon" with I.C. Endaya
1990-94	Official UNICEF Card Design
1989	"The Philippines" with C. Nakpil & "Chile, A Discovery of Colors" with S. Fanega
1988	"Sarap" with D. Fernandez, E. Alegre
1987	"Philippine Ancestral Houses" with F. Zialcita, N. Oshima
1986	"Painture, New Lixicom of Philippine Art" with P. Zafaralla
1981	"Images of the Homeland" with M. Baterina
1980	"Tribute to the Filipino Farmers" with L. Benesa
1974	"Paete, Sketchbook of a Filipino Town" with B. Afuang
1972	"The Graphic Art of Manuel D. Baldemor" with M. Duldulao

== Notable people ==
Angeline Baldemor

Angelito Baldemor

Angelo Baldemor

Antero Baldemor

Celoine Baldemor

Charming Baldemor

Felix "Kid" Baldemor

Fred Baldemor

Leandro Baldemor

Mailah Baldemor

Marvin Baldemor

Mike Baldemor

Nick C. Baldemor

Vince Baldemor

Walter Baldemor

Wilfredo Baldemor

Wilson Baldemor

Zoerya Emi Baldemor Abuel

Vicente Mannsala

== Bibliography ==
Africano, C., Baldemor, M., and Casanova, A. (2005). Tatlong Haligi ng Sining. In Mga Natatanging Anak ng Paete. UST Publishing House. Featuring artwork by Manuel Baldemor.
