= Norma Belleza =

Filipino painter

- Born: Norma Belleza; April 3, 1939; San Fernando, La Union, Commonwealth of the Philippines
- Education: University of Santo Tomas
- Known for: Painting
- Notable work: See below
- Family: Fatima Baquiran (Daughter), Angelito Antonio (Husband), Marcel Antonio (son), Emil Antonio (son)

Norma Belleza (born May 3, 1939) is a Filipino painter. She was born in San Fernando, La Union. Back then, her family was composed of billboard designers. Married to the Filipino artist, Angelito Antonio, with their children Fatima Baquiran, Emil Antonio, and Marcel Antonio. She studied at the University of Santo Tomas in 1962 and obtained her bachelor's degree in Fine Arts.

== Career ==
In her early years, she painted dark and depressing paintings. Her paintings then turned into bright colors and detailed work on folk genre, including women vendors, potters and workers. Figurative works placed emphasis on her subject’s physical appearance. After obtaining her bachelor's degree, she resided with her husband Angelito Antonio. Being idle for 10 years, she had her solo works exhibited at Metro Gallery in 1976. Ever since then, she had nine one-person shows exhibited at different galleries such as: Luz Gallery and ABC Gallery.

Belleza has three children. Her husband died in 2025.

== See also ==
- Angelito Antonio
- Fatima Baquiran

== Bibliography ==
- CCP Encyclopedia of Philippine Art, Vol 4. Manila: Cultural Center of the Philippines, 1994.
- Kintanar, Thelma and Ventura, Sylvia Mendez. Self-Portraits: Twelve Filipina Artists Speak. Quezon City: Ateneo de Manila Press, 1999.
- 20th Century, 1st Ed, Vol II; CCP Vol IV; Archipelago Magazine Vol. 4, 1977
