= Luzviminda =

Luzviminda (sometimes spelled Luzvisminda) is a portmanteau of Luzon, the Visayas, and Mindanao — the names of the three major island groups of the Philippines. It is a feminine given name.

Notable individuals with this name include:

- Luzviminda Ilagan, Filipino activist and politician
- Luzviminda Tancangco, Commission on Elections commissioner
