= Antonio Austria =

Filipino visual artist

- Born: Antonio Gilbuena Austria; May 5, 1936 (age 90); Shanghai, China
- Known for: Painting

Antonio Gilbuena Austria (born May 5, 1936) is a Filipino visual artist.

== Early life ==
Antonio Gilbuena Austria was born in Shanghai, China on May 5, 1936. His parents, Pedro Austria and Lucila Gilbuena, were both from San Pedro, Laguna, Philippines. In 1937, after the Sino-Japanese War broke out, his family returned to the Philippines and settled in the Municipality of San Juan (now a city).

In 1942, the young Austria began his education at Santa Lucia Elementary School, located just a few meters away from their house in San Juan. As a young boy, he learned drawing by copying his favorite characters from the comics. By the time he went to high school at San Sebastian College in 1948, he had decided to pursue a career in the arts.

After finishing high school in 1952, he studied fine arts at the University of Santo Tomas in Manila (UST). In Santo Tomas, he honed his artistic skills under the tutelage of the most renowned Filipino artists, such as Victorio Edades, Vicente Manansala, Diosdado Lorenzo and Galo Ocampo, who all greatly influenced his painting style. It was also at UST where he met his close friend, National Artist Ang Kiukok.

== Career ==
After graduating with a Bachelor of Fine Arts degree in 1956, Austria's first job was in the Universal Textile Mills, as a textile designer. Austria worked as a textile designer for 10 years, before teaching art at the University of Santo Tomas in 1969. He taught for 27 years, before deciding to become an artist.

In 1959, he joined the Art Association of the Philippines (AAP) with his entry piece "Magpapalayok". He has since joined several exhibitions in the Philippines and abroad. In 1979, he presented about nineteen works in oil and twelve composition drawings in Gallerie Dominique. Between 1962 and 1982, he exhibited works in Australia, New York, and Japan. Austria has also participated in several group exhibits held in various galleries in Manila.

== Style ==
He has been inspired by simple subjects and everyday scenes, such as Jeepneys, sari-sari stores, and billiard parlors. He is known for his compositions, and some of his paintings are Philippine themed.

== Awards ==
- 1970 - "Thirteen Artists Award"
- 1st Prize - Philippine National Bank's 60th Anniversary art exhibit
- 2002 - Awarded "Patnubay ng Sining at Kalinangan sa Larangan ng Pagpipinta"
- Outstanding Thomasian Alumnus in the field of Visual Arts
