= Chen Bing Sun =

Chinese-Filipino writer (1914–1988)

Chen Bing Sun (Chinese: 陳明勳; pinyin: Chén Míngxūn; 1914 − 8 January 1988) was a Chinese-Filipino playwright, artist and song writer. He became known as the Father of Chinese Brush Painting in the Philippines.

Chen came from Shanghai, he was educated at School of Hanzhou in 1930, and then at the State University of KiWang Wan in 1932 and the Shanghai School of Arts in 1936.

He married the actress Ouyang Feiying (歐陽飛鶯, real name Wu Jingjuan 吳靜娟) in Xiamen while he was awaiting a visa to visit Philippines. He planned to tour with the "Star Theatre", but the communist revolution happened in mainland China, and he did not return. He moved to the Philippines and was a professor at the University of the Philippines. His style is a combination of Tang and Sung. In his teaching there were four stages. Firstly simpler flora such as bamboo, primrose and orchid were taught. The second stage was copying peony, birds and fish. The third stage was landscape and humans. The final fourth stage was composition. He painted many horse pictures.

He became a believer in Jesus Christ, and as a result of this included verses from the bible on each of his paintings. This became a characteristic of his art. He became a deacon at the Grace Christian Church in Manila.

In 1974 he composed a cantata titled Song of Wisdom with 6 songs: Do not know, Fear of the Lord, blessing, stay away from crime, rest and Song of Wisdom.

His students included Thuy Lien, Fernanado Zobel Nicki Chen Jamaliah Marais, Cissy Gray, Homoon Wollock Chung Youn, Hiroko Thomson, Heidi Uhlig, Abigail Reeder Nazareth, and Elizabeth Ann B. Quirico.

Patrons included George Ty from Metrobank, and Alfredo Ching the owner of Baguio Oil.

He taught at Grace Christian High School. Later he opened the Chinese Artists' Guild in 1958. He remained director in 1972.

Chen also designed book covers, drew anti-communist cartoons, worked as a journalist for a Taiwanese newspaper. He was the first Chinese chief delegate to the 1960 UNESCO Convention.

He had children Angela Claudia, Deanna, Edward, Florence, Grace and Henry named in alphabetical order. He died in 1988 after an illness. He had cancer.

== Exhibitions ==
- Japan
- USA
- Hyatt Regency Manila 10–20 October 1974
- Cultural Center of the Philippines 1977
- Metropolitan Museum of Manila 15–31 May 1987
- Cultural Center of the Philippines 16–24 November 2013
- Century Park Sheraton Hotel planned November 2014
