= Vincent de Pio =

Filipino artist (born 1979)

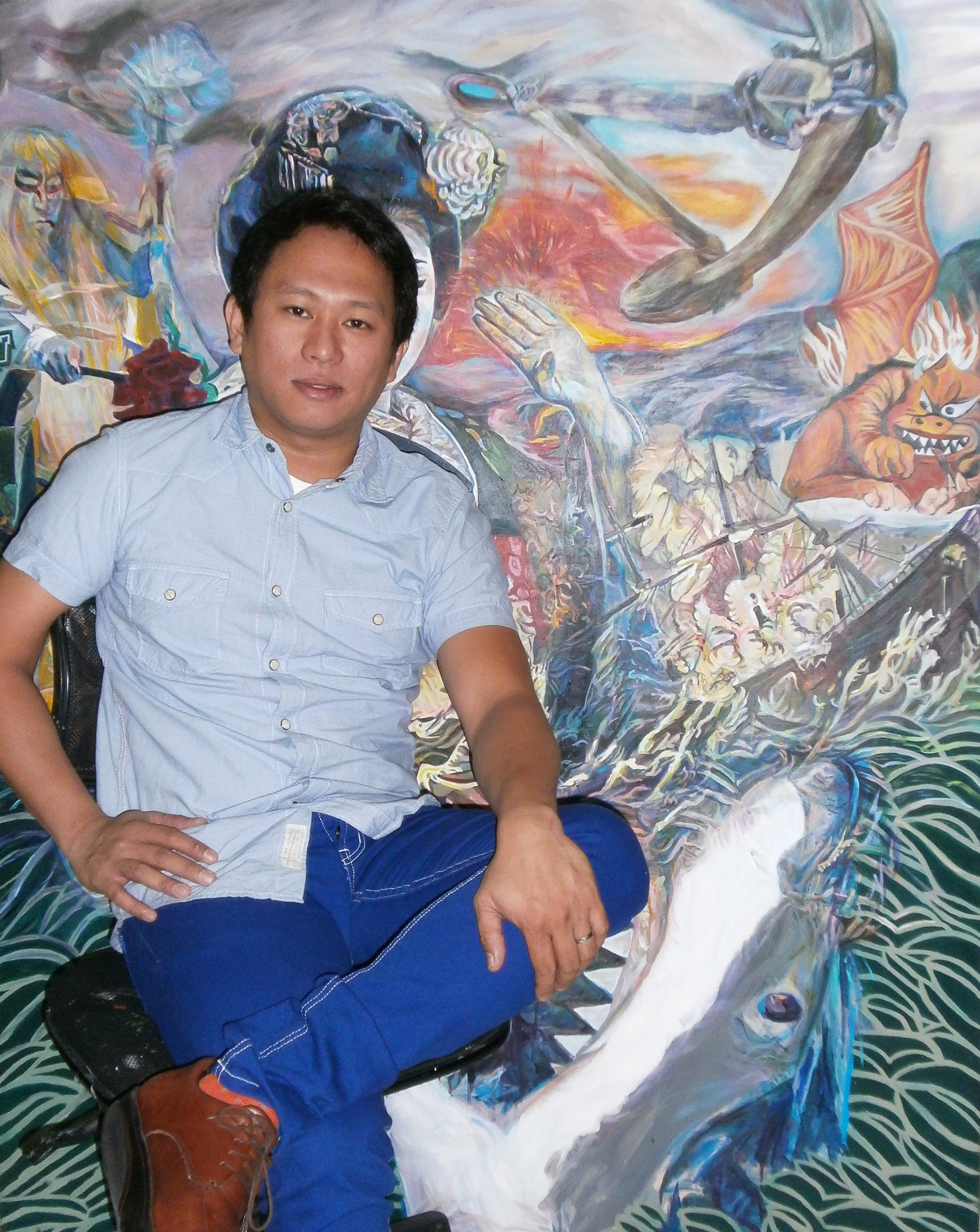
- Vincent de Pio with his painting, "Shark's Fin"
- Born: March 20, 1979 (age 47)
- Education: University of the Philippines School of Fine Arts
- Occupation: Artist
- Father: Gig de Pio
- Relatives: Siblings: Simkin de Pio, Gig Jr. de Pio, Domino de Pio, Julian de Pio

Vincent de Pio (born March 20, 1979) is a Filipino artist and a graduate of the University of the Philippines School of Fine Arts, where he majored in painting.

== Early life and career ==
De Pio is the fourth child of artist and professor Gig de Pio; his siblings are Simkin, Gig Jr, Domino, and Julian de Pio. He was exposed to various art techniques and styles from a young age, including drawing anatomy. He cites the expressionism art movement as an inspiration, and his subjects range from landscapes to portraits and figurative works.

De Pio is also inspired by classical music, and his first solo exhibition featured paintings of a woman playing a cello. Later, he shifted his focus to Japanese culture. De Pio's paintings often explore social politics, as well as fictional and non-fictional narratives. His artistic influences include his uncle, Vicente Manansala, and Kent Williams. He is also inspired by Juan Luna and Arturo R. Luz and lists Impressionism and Cubism as artistic movements that inspire him. He often combines expressionist and realist techniques in his work.

He has participated in over 20 group exhibits and has been a finalist in competitions at the UP College of Fine Arts, the Metrobank Art Competition, and the GSIS National Art Competition. De Pio is an artist member of Galerie Joaquin, where he had his debut solo exhibition.

De Pio's sculptures have been exhibited in Manila, Singapore, and through online platforms.

== Shows ==
=== "Quiet Fortissimos", 2009 ===
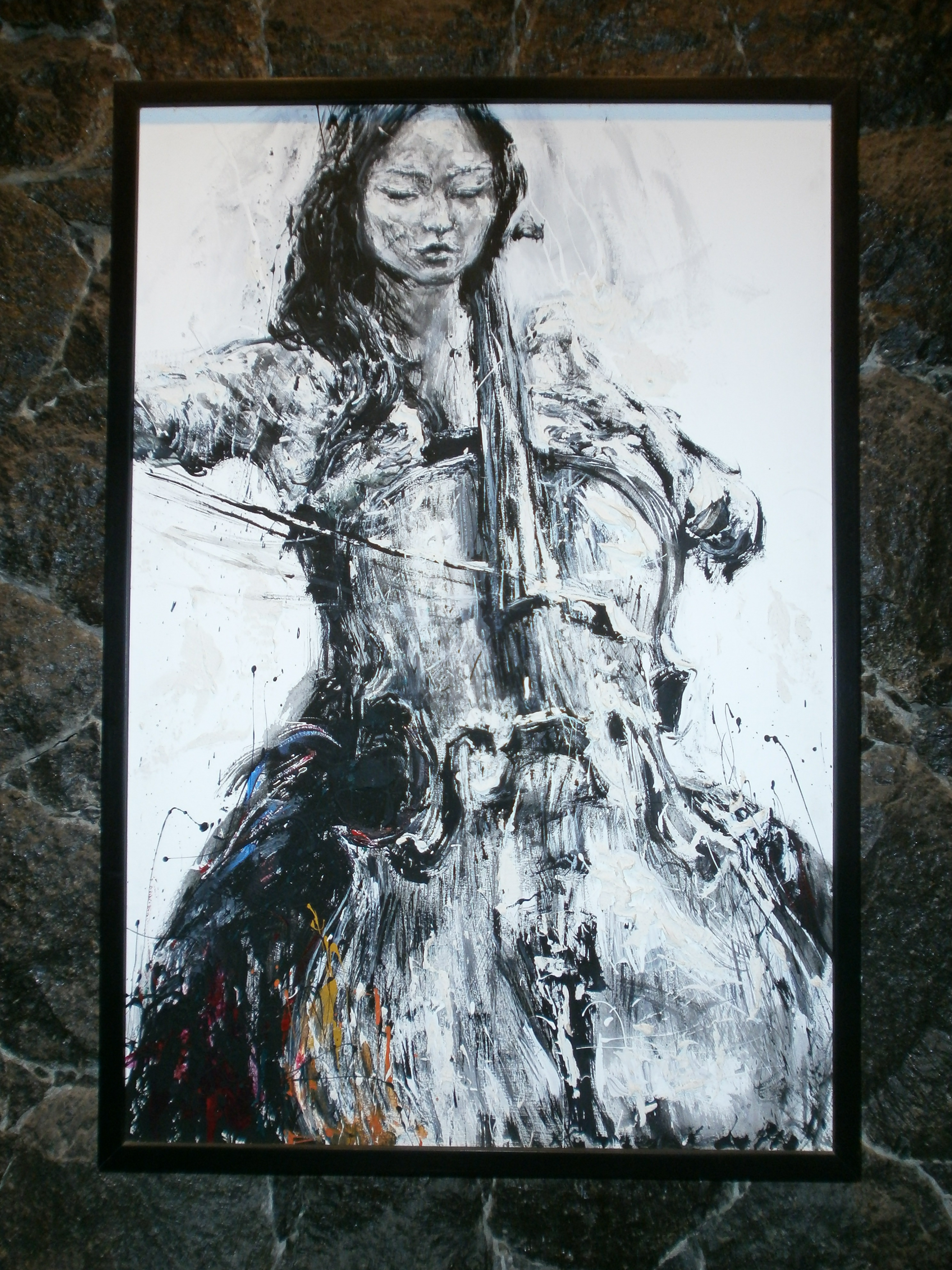
"Black & White Cellist" by Vincent de Pio Acrylic on Canvas

"Quiet Fortissimos" was Vincent de Pio's first solo exhibition, held from January 30, 2009, through February 13, 2009, at Galerie Joaquin in San Juan, Metro Manila.

The title of the exhibit reflects the dynamic element in de Pio's works, with each artwork intended to reflect changes in the artist's moods and techniques.

In 2005, de Pio was among the artists invited to exhibit at fundraising concerts held in memory of cellist Tiking Lopez. Ena Song, a visiting Korean cellist, was one of the guest performers. De Pio was reportedly drawn to her and imagined how he wanted to approach his paintings the first time he saw her. Song, who did not speak fluent English, became his muse, inspiring several paintings even years after their first meeting. These paintings later formed the majority of his first solo exhibit.

== Achievements ==
Year	Competition
1999	Finalist, On the Spot Painting Contest, "Dengue Awareness", UP College of Fine Arts
2004	Finalist, AAP National Art Competition
2006	Finalist, Metrobank Art Competition, Water Medium on Paper
2009	Finalist, LRTA Art Competition
2011	Finalist, Ali Art Competition

== Auctions ==
Year	Auction
2007	Artwork auctioned in Larasati Auctioneers, Singapore
2008	Artwork auctioned in Masterpiece, "Southeast Asian Modern and Contemporary Art" Singapore Artwork auctioned in Larasati Auctioneers, "Pictures of Asia" Singapore Artwork auctioned in Borobudur Auctions, Singapore
2011	Artwork auctioned in International Care Ministries, Hong Kong, September 28 Artwork auctioned in Ateneo Art Auction, Finale Gallery, Makati, October 1

== Book publications ==
Year	Publication
2005	"A Treasury of Philippine Nudes"
2007	"Larasati, Pictures of Asia"
2008	"Masterpiece, Southeast Asian and Contemporary Art" "Larasati, Pictures of Asia" "Borobudur, Southeast Asian Contemporary and Modern Art" "100 Years, 100 Nudes", UP Alumni Centennial Celebration
2010	"ManilArt1 10, Asia's Latest Contemporary Art"

== Major exhibitions ==
Year	Exhibition
2005	4-man show, "Women", Galerie Joaquin, Singapore Guevarra Group Art Exhibit, "Cello and Other Music paintings", Galerie Joaquin with Sinagtala, Philam Life Theater, United Nations Avenue, Manila
2006	Singapore Biennale 2006, Art of the Philippines and Indonesia, August 30
2007	Guevarra Group Art Exhibit, "Art for a Cause", A Project of the Rotary Club of Makati, Bel-Air, Galerie Joaquin, San Juan
2008	UP Alumni Art Exhibit, UP Centennial Celebration, "100 Nudes, 100 Years", Mandarin Suites, Gateway Group Art Exhibit, "Modern and Contemporary Philippine Art", Galerie Joaquin, San Juan
2009	One man show, "Quiet Fortissimo", Galerie Raphael, Serendra Various Artists, 6th Edition of the China Gallery Exposition (CIGE 2009), China World Trade Center Exhibition Hall, Beijing, supported by the Ministry of Culture of the People's Republic of China PAMANA, Father-Son Art Exhibit, sponsored by the National Commission for Culture and the Arts (NCCA) in celebration of the National Arts Month, Clamshell Wow Philippines, Intramuros, Manila Various Artists, Manila Art 09, Asia's Latest Contemporary Art Fair, NBC Tent, Bonifacio Global City, Taguig, Metro Manila Various Artists, "Art for a Cause," South Wing, House of Representatives, Quezon City
2010	Guevarra Group Art Exhibit," Year 8," Art Center, Megamall Various Artists, "ManilArt 10: Asia's Latest Contemporary Art Fair,"SMX Convention Center, Pasay 3 Man Exhibit, "Kababaihan," Galerie Nicholas, Toronto, Canada
2011	Two 1 Man Exhibit with Aileen Lanuza, "(un)Robed," Galerie Raphael, Serendra Various Artists, "ManilArt 11: 3rd Philippine International Art Fair," NBC Tent, Bonifacio Global City, Taguig, Metro Manila Art Auction, International Care Ministries, Wan Chai Exhibition and Convention Centre, Hong Kong Ateneo Art Auction, Finale Gallery, Makati Araneta, UP mural project commission
2012	Various Artists, "ManilArt 12: 3rd Philippine International Art Fair,"Mall of Asia, SMX Convention Center UNICEF, Auction for Action Banzai, Solo Exhibition, Galerie Joaquin Main, San Juan
2013	Various Artists, "ManilArt 12: 3rd Philippine International Art Fair," SM Aura, Convention Center, Taguig
