= Mario Parial =

Filipino painter (1944–2013)

- Born: Mario Parial; August 13, 1944; Gapan, Nueva Ecija, Commonwealth of the Philippines
- Died: December 22, 2013 (aged 69)
- Education: University of Santo Tomas
- Known for: Print Making, Painting & Photography
- Awards: Thirteen Artist Awardee, 1972

Mario Parial (August 13, 1944 – December 22, 2013) was a multi-awarded Filipino painter, printmaker, sculptor and photographer. His works have been sold at Sotheby's.

== About ==
Mario Parial was born on August 13, 1944, in Nueva Ecija. One of the fourteen children of Fidel Parial and Aurora Agustin. He studied grade school at the Pura V Kalaw Elementary School, graduated in 1958. In 1963, he graduated from the Roosevelt Memorial School in Quezon City where he was the editor of Duplex, the Campus paper. In 1964, he learned printmaking under Manuel Rodriguez Senior, the father of Print Making in the Philippines. In 1967, he began the year with a job with FairAds Inc located in Escolta, Manila. In 1969, he graduated from the University of Santo Tomas, Bachelor of Fine Arts Major in Advertising. In 1969, he joined the Faculty of the University of Santo Tomas to teach painting, printmaking and photography. In 1970, he married Carina Claro with whom he has 2 Children, namely, Kristine born in 1971 and Mikel Parial (Also a Painter, Printmaker and Photographer) born in 1972. His classmates, five of them formed the PENTA GROUP an advertising group and Mario was one of the graphic designer.. He also had a brief stint teaching art at the University of the Philippines. He died on December 22, 2013, due to cancer.

== Awards ==
- 3rd Prize for a Stained Glass Design, 1963, UST Annual Art Competition
- 4th Prize for Flying Figures, 1964, Quezon City Arts Festival
- 1st Honorable mention, "The Fire Is Over," 1965, 15th SNSAC Sculpture Category
- Honorable Mention, 1965, UST Annual Art Competition
- First Prize for "Flight in the Sun" 1966, 1st (AAP)Art Association of the Philippines Graphic Arts
- First Prize for "The World Has Many Faces," 1966, 16th SNSAC Sculpture Category
- Certificate of merit, "Once Upon A Construction," 1966, 16th SNSAC Sculpture Category
- Certificate of merit, "Night Flight," 1966
- 1st Prize for "Moriones", 1967, PAL Art Competition
- 2nd Prize, 1967, UST Students Annual
- Certificate of Merit, "Hour After Hour", 1967, 17th SNSAC Graphic Arts Category
- 4th Prize, 1968, UST Photo Contest
- 2nd Prize, 1968, PAP Annual
- Honorable Mention, 1968, PAP Annual
- Benavides Award for Outstanding Performance to University Prestige from the University of Santo Tomas, 1967.
- 2nd Prize, 1970, PAP Annual
- Thirteen Artists Awardee of the Cultural Center of the Philippines, 1972.
- Outstanding Thomasian Award from UST, 1978.
- Critic's Choice Awardee, 1978

== Shows ==
- One-Man Show, 1965, AAP Series of New Talents 10
- One-Man Show, 1975, Galerie Bleue, Makati
- One-Man Show, 1976, "Halaman", Metro Gallery, Makati
- One-Man Show, 1977, Galerie Bleue, Makati
- One-Man Show, 1978, ABC Galleries, Manila
- One-Man Show, 1979, Heritage Art Center, Quezon City
- One-Man Show, 1980, Ma-Yi Associates Gallery, Makati
- One-Man Show, 1980, CCP Small Gallery, Manila
- One-Man Show, 1982, Hiraya Gallery, Manila
- One-Man Show, 1993, Manila Peninsula, Makati
- One-Man Show, 1996, Shangri-La Edsa Plaza Mall, Mandaluyong
- One-Man Show, 1997, Asian Images, Phil. Consulate N.Y.
- One-Man Show, 1998, Casa Victoria, New Jersey
- One-Man Show, 1998, "Afternoon Mood", Gallery Nouveau, Mandaluyong
- One-Man Show, 1998, "Parial In Davao", GenLuna Gallery, Davao City
- One-Man Show, 1999, "Mahal Na Birhen", Gallery 828, Mandaluyong
- One-Man Show, 2000, "Parial Lithographs", Boston Gallery, Quezon City
- One-Man Show, 2000, Philippine Consulate, San Francisco, US
- One-Man Show, 2000, Casa Victoria, New Jersey, US
- One-Man Show, 2001, "Marikina and Antipolo:Landscapes", Blind Tiger Cafe, Quezon City
- One-Man Show, 2004, "Pagdiriwang", Galerie Joaquin-Podium, Mandaluyong
- One-Man Show, 2005, "Pasasalamat", Galerie Joaquin-Main, San Juan, Metro Manila,
- One-Man Show, 2008, "Festivo", Galerie Joaquin-Main, San Juan, Metro Manila.
- One-Man Show, 2009,"Bountiful Harvest", Galerie Raphael, Taguig
- One-Man Show, 2009," The Peripatetic Process of Parial's Painted Photographs", Kaida Art Gallery
- One-Man Show, 2010, "Legacy", Galerie Joaquin, at Podium
- One-Man Show, 2011," Majore", Galerie Joaquin, Mandaluyong
- One-Man Show, 2013, "The Peripatetic Process of Parial's Painted Photographs 2" Galerie Francesca, Megamall

== Group and Foreign Shows ==
- 1966, Twenty Years of Philippine Art, Luz Gallery
- 1966, Philippine Prints, Taiwan
- 1969, Annual Shows, Luz Gallery
- 1972, Thirteen Artist Exhibit, CCP
- 1979, Museum Artists, Museum of the Philippines
- 1980, Museum Artists, Museum of the Philippines
- 1980, Philippine Paintings, China
- 1981, China Selection, Art Association of the Philippines
- 1983, ASEAN Show, CCP
- 1985, Prints Show, Bonn, Germany
- 1992, Tribute to Amorsolo, University of the Philippines
- 1994, Filipino Exhibit, China Club, Hong Kong
- 1994, Singapore Impression's, Robinson's Galleria, Singapore
- 1994, Philippines 2000 Travelling Exhibition, US
- 1994, "Lines and Colors", Penang, Malaysia
- 1994, ASEAN Exhibition, Jakarta, Indonesia
- 1997, Philippine Center Gallery, New York, US
- 1997, Mississauga, Ontario, Canada
- 1999, "Reunion of Thirteen Artists", CCP
- 1999, Group Show, Metropolitan Gallery
- 1999, "Limbag Sining", PAP, CCP
- 1999, Group Show, Museo Pambata, Manila
- 1999, Print Show, Museo Iloilo, Iloilo
- 2000, "Philippine Images", Philippine Consulate, San Francisco, US

== Published works ==
- The 1980 Mobil Art Awards by Alice Guillermo, pp 64–67
- Contemporary Philippine Art by Manuel Duldulao, Sr.
- The Struggle for Philippine Art by Purita Kalaw Ledesma and Amadis Ma. Guerrero
- A Century of Realism in Philippine Art by Manuel Duldulao, Jr.
- Filipino Nudes by Alfredo Roces
- Okir by Leonides Benesa
- Cultural Center of the Philippines Annual Book, 1978–1982
- 25 Years of Philippine Printmaking, Museum of Philippine Art
- Art Philippines, The Crucible Workshop
- Miracles of Mary, BlackBerry Press Inc., Harper Collins Publishing Co., New York, US

== Parial on Philippine Stamps ==
On 28 November 2005, a Set of 4 Stamps and a Souvenir Sheet was issued for the National Stamp Collecting Month. One of the Stamps featured a Print by Mario Parial, a Rubber Cut, titled "BULBS" The Denomination was P6.00 and 140,000 of this were only issued.

== Parial at Sothebys ==
3 Mario Parial Paintings have been sold at Sothebys. Nine Fishes done in 2005 and measures 16x36 Inches and sold at Sothebys Singapore on October 9, 2005. Blessings II sold on April 29, 2007, at Sothebys Singapore and Eight Horses sold on Oct 22, 2006 at Sothebys Singapore.
