= Elmer Borlongan =

Filipino painter

- Born: Elmer Misa Borlongan; January 7, 1967 (age 59); Santa Mesa, Manila, Philippines
- Education: University of the Philippines Diliman, College of Fine Arts
- Known for: Painting
- Notable work: "Gabay", "Birheng Walang Dambana" (Virgin Without Altar), "Walang Iwanan", "Dynamite Kid", "Batang Edsa", "Ang Mangingisda sa Ilalim ng Buwan" (The Fisherman Under the Moon), "Pop Cola Kid"
- Movement: Figurative expressionism
- Awards: 1994 Thirteen Artists Award, Cultural Center of the Philippines; 2004 Award for Continuing Excellence and Service, Metrobank Foundation.

Elmer Misa Borlongan (born January 7, 1967) is a prominent contemporary Filipino painter best known for his distinctive use of figurative expressionism.

He rose to prominence as a recipient of the Cultural Center of the Philippines' Thirteen Artist Awards in 1994, and his works have since become one of the most widely exhibited and most sought-after at auctions among Southeast Asian artists.

He is married to fellow artist Plet Bolipata.

== Style ==
When asked about his visual approach, Borlongan describes his style as figurative expressionism. Art curator Ditas Samson expounds on this, describing a typical Borlongan canvas as "dominated by the human figure - often distorted in shape, in unreal hues."

Borlongan's early work is known for its usage of figures in urban settings, in stark contrast to the idyllic rural settings of the earlier generation of Filipino artists, such as Fernando Amorsolo.

Later works by Borlongan, after his move from the streets of Manila to the provincial settings of Zambales, increasingly featured people in rural settings as well, but imbued with the same tense energy which characterizes his urban-setting figures - a thematic contrast which has been described as a prominent characteristic of Borlongan's later corpus.

== Education and early influences ==
=== Family, early art education, and roots of social consciousness ===
Borlongan was born at 7:25 AM on January 7, 1967, at De Ocampo Memorial Medical Center in Santa Mesa, Manila to chemist Pascual Garcia Borlongan of Calumpit, Bulacan and Dolores Pido Misa of Mandaluyong, and grew up in the Nueve de Pebrero area of Mandaluyong. His father Pascual encouraged Borlongan's artistic pursuits at a very young age, encouraging him to draw everyday objects from various angles.

He began his formal art education in 1978, at the young age of eleven, taking up Fernando Sena's art classes offered under the auspices of Children's Museum and Library, Inc (CMLI).

Recalling Sena's influence in a 2012 interview, Borlongan recounts:

"It was the painter Fernando Sena who introduced me to the art world. While I was studying under him at the Children's Museum and Library, Inc. (CMLI) in 1978, he would open the pages of the encyclopedia and show in class the works of his favorite Dutch painters Rembrandt and Frans Hals.
[Fernando Sena...] taught me the basics of drawing and painting. It was a solid foundation to prepare me to the direction of where I want my art to proceed. All of his students imitated his style to understand the techniques he was teaching. It was up to the individual to find his own identity."

Sena also contributed to Borlongan's artistic development by convincing him to enroll in a fine arts course instead of taking up architecture as he had originally planned.

Borlongan's exposure to the poor areas in Tondo in Manila and in Montalban and Antipolo in Rizal province where he apprenticed under Sena during workshops would help provide Borlongan with much of the imagery that would become the subjects of his later works.

Borlongan came of age in a period of significant social tumult in the Philippines - contributing to the social awareness inherent in Borlongan's work. 1970 saw the beginning of the so-called "First Quarter Storm"; 1971 saw the Plaza Miranda Bombing; September 1972 saw Ferdinand Marcos' proclamation of Martial Law; 1983 saw the assassination of Senator Benigno Aquino Jr.; and 1986 saw the overthrow of the Marcos government via the so-called EDSA revolution - just a year shy of Borlongan's graduation from college.

=== Undergraduate period at the University of the Philippines Diliman ===
Borlongan enrolled at the University of the Philippines' College of Fine Arts in 1983 and majored in painting.

Here Borlongan became a founding member of the famed Grupong Salingpusa, initially an informal group of young student artists which would later become significant voices in the Philippine contemporary art movement, including such figures as Joy Mallari, Karen Flores and Manny Garibay.

A subset of Grupong Salingpusa, consisting of Borlongan, Mallari, Flores, Mark Justiniani, and Federico Slevert, later came together to form the Sanggawa Art Collective in 1994.

In his second year in college, Borlongan was selected as a delegate to the ASEAN Youth Painting Workshop and Exhibition, which was held at the National Art Gallery in Kuala Lumpur, Malaysia. "Being a delegate exposed me to new developments in Southeast Asian art," Borlongan recalls. The Filipino delegates later held a homecoming exhibit at the Cultural Center of the Philippines.

Borlongan got his bachelor's degree in Fine Arts, major in painting, in 1987.

== Early work ==
By the time of Borlongan's graduation, the Philippines' socioeconomic and political climate was still tumultuous. 1987 saw the national trauma that was the Mendiola massacre, and numerous coups d'état threatened the new government of Corazon Aquino from 1986 to 1989. Massive destruction from natural disasters took the form of the 1990 Luzon earthquake and the 1991 Mt Pinatubo Eruption, and crippling power outages dampened the Philippine economy.

Borlongan immediately found himself using his art to engage the Filipino's social awareness. Borlongan recalls:

"My classmate Manny Garibay asked me to help him finish a mural for Lean Alejandro's funeral procession. It was an eye-opener for me on the ills of Philippine society. I eventually joined the activist art collective ABAY or Artista ng Bayan along with another classmate Mark Justiniani. We were prolific in doing street murals, effigy, posters, banners, streamers, illustrations and comics for cause-oriented groups. Giving art workshops and organizing students were also a part of our activities."

Borlongan's career got a jumpstart when his painting "Rehimen" won the second prize in the Metrobank Annual National Painting Competition in 1988, giving his works significant exposure and positioning him as an up-and coming artist.

In 1989, he went to Paris as a member of the Philippine delegation to the International Conference on Human Rights and Democracy, along with the members of Bukluran ng mga Musikero para sa Bayan (Buklod) and artists from the Philippine Educational Theater Association (PETA). Borlongan recalls being inspired by speakers, most notably the Chinese pro-democracy activists from Tiananmen Square.

Another work, "Tampuhan", again won him the second place in the Metrobank Annual National Painting Competition in 1992.

1993 saw a return to the University of the Philippines Diliman campus for Borlongan. He and Roberto Feleo were artist delegates to the 2nd ASEAN Workshop, Exhibit, and Symposium on Aesthetics in Manila, and as part of the workshop the two were given working studios in UPD.

== Rise to prominence and marriage to Plet Bolipata ==
The relative success of the Philippines 2000 platform instituted by president Fidel V. Ramos in 1992 created an environment where young artists like Borlongan could find more opportunities. But the platform's thrusts towards industrialization and economic liberalization presented causes for concern - themes which continued to find their way into the themes of Borlongan's work.

In 1994, the Cultural Center of the Philippines recognized Borlongan with the Thirteen Artists Award, an award that honors artists who "take the chance and risk to restructure, restrengthen, and renew art making and art thinking.”

The following year, 1995, Borlongan agreed to serve as Artist-in-Residence at CASA San Miguel, San Antonio, Zambales. There, he met Plet Bolipata, whose brother, acclaimed violinist Alfonso “Coke” Bolipata, had founded the art center.

In 1996, he took up a posting as Artist-in-Residence in ARCUS Ibaraki, Japan.

Borlongan received a lot of exposure during the 1998 Philippine Centennial celebrations, notably being part of "At Home and Abroad: 20 Contemporary Filipino Artists", a centennial celebration exhibit that opened first at the Asian Art Museum in San Francisco and then moved to the Houston Art Museum and the East-West Center Museum in Honolulu before finally closing at the Metropolitan Museum in Manila.

In the same year, Borlongan married Plet Bolipata, and the couple settled in the Borlongan family property in Mandaluyong.

Borlongan exhibited widely in the late 1990s and around the early 2000s, with shows in Tokyo, New York, Sydney, Singapore, Irvine, Brisbane, Honolulu, and Kuala Lumpur, among others.

== Zambales period ==
In 2002, the Borlongan couple decided to move from their residence in Nueve de Pebrero, Mandaluyong, and settled in San Antonio, Zambales. The move had a significant influence on the art of both Borlongan and Bolipata.

Bolipata noted in 2014:

"The mango trees, mountains, and sea opened and brightened up our canvases, and widened our view of the world. It is a gift to each other to create in two separate studios. We move freely, without marital ties that bind, uncompromising in our own worlds. Emong's studio is bursting with Rock and Roll music and mine is deeply ensconed in silence. We each have a sacred space to thresh out our ideas and experiences, mindful only of what we individually need to express."

For Borlongan, the move also meant an expansion in terms of figurative subjects - where once his work featured people in mostly urban settings, his works from this later period began to feature people from the countryside as well. This contrast between "City" and "Country" has since become a touchpoint whenever Borlongan works are exhibited together, such as in 2011's "Kariyanan" at the Pinto Art Gallery in Antipolo, Rizal, and at 2014's "Elmer Borlongan In City and Country (1992-2012)" at the Ayala Museum.

Illustrator and designer Lisa Ito, writing in 2011 about this transition, notes:

"In terms of style and subject matter, the transition from Manila to Zambales is evident to those who are familiar with his earlier works. There are subtle shifts, from urban to rural themes (as well as subjects treading the hazy line dividing these two in the Philippine context), as well as lighter tonal changes in his palette and the freeing up of background space compared to his earlier works."

== Other activities ==
While a student at the UPD, Borlongan was the guitarist for a rock band called Is It Safe?, playing punk-influenced sets in a bar in Malate.
