= Onib Olmedo =

Filipino painter (1937–1996)

- Born: Luis Claudio Olmedo; July 7, 1937; Manila, Philippines
- Died: September 8, 1996 (aged 59)
- Education: BS Architecture
- Alma mater: Mapúa Institute of Technology
- Style: Expressionism
- Spouse: Bettina Rodriguez Olmedo
- Children: 2

Onib Olmedo (July 7, 1937 – September 8, 1996) was a Filipino painter. He illustrated The Body Book (1993) by Gilda Cordero-Fernando. He created populist art and depicted the marginalized part of the society. In 1970, he decided to shift from is 12-year career in architecture to painting where he became a leading figure in Philippine expressionism.
