= Filipino women artists =

Filipino women artists started contributing to Philippine art when the Philippines was still a colonial province of Spain (1521–1898). They have continued to participate as art creators after World War II through modern times by either following the traditional way of making art or by departing from such tradition by embracing modernism and other modes of expressing themselves through art.

== Spanish era (1521–1898) ==
=== Sculpting ===
The first Filipino woman to achieve a level of prominence in the art world, while the Philippines was under the management of Spain, was sculptor Pelagia Mendoza y Gotianquin (1867-1939). The first female student at the Academia de Dibujo y Pintura (Academy of Drawing and Painting), Mendoza studied sculpting under the mentorship of Agustin Saez and Lorenzo Rocha. Her bust of Christopher Columbus won an award during the quattrocentenial celebration of the Discovery of the Americas.

=== Painting ===
In the field of painting in the Philippines, the works of art of Carmen Zaragoza y Rojas became notable. Zaragoza was the painter of the masterpiece known as Dos Inteligentias (literally “Two Intellectuals”, 1892), a painting that won Zaragoza a prize during the 1892 anniversary of Christopher Columbus and his discovery of the Americas. Two years later, during the 1895 Exposicion Regional de Filipinas (1895 Regional Exposition in the Philippines), Zaragoza would be awarded a copper medal for creating two landscapes.

Other notable Filipino women painters during the time of Zaragoza were Concha Paterno, Adele Paterno, Conception de Montilla, Patricia Reyes, Ana Garcia Plana, Josefa Majo, Concepcion Ortiz, Olimpia Teran de Abella, Rafaella Calanta, and Femina David.

Another woman painter who excelled in the field of art in the Philippines was Paz Paterno. Her important painting known as Still Life was decorated with native fruits such as lanzones (Lansium domesticum), bananas, mabolos (velvet apple, Diospyros blancoi), atis (sugar-apple, the fruit of Annona squamosa), balimbings (carambola or starfruit, fruit of Averrhoa carambola), pili nuts, and coconuts.

== After World War II (1946-present) ==
After World War II, new female artists emerged carrying the modernistic themes in their art. Among these artists were painters such as Anita Magsaysay-Ho, the first Filipino woman abstractionist Nena Saguil, and Philippine Art Gallery owner Lyd Arguilla. During the 1970s and the 1980s, women printmakers and graphic artists began contributing their works of imagery to the Philippine art scene, such as Brenda Fajardo, Ofelia Gelvezon-Tequi, and Imelda Cajipe-Endaya. This period also saw the emergence of women art collectives in the Philippines such as Kasibulan, for which these artists where members of. Women sculptors like Agnes Arellano, Julie Lluch, Genera Banzon, and Francesca Enriquez also made their noteworthy impressions to the field of sculpting by creating non-traditional statues.

Ofelia Gelvezon-Tequi, a pioneer in the print-making industry, created a notable printed portrait of a widow standing next to the casket of her dead husband. The casket in the image was draped with a Philippine flag, while the widow was standing and holding vigil next to the coffin. Gelvezon-Tequi also produced works made of acrylic-on-paper in 1995. Her masterpieces later focused on portraits of Filipino women such former Philippine President Corazon Aquino, the assassins of her husband Benigno Aquino Jr., and about plotters of coup d'etats.

As a mixed-media artist, Brenda Fajardo used art to describe folk magic and folklore of the Sulod people (part of the Aeta ethnic group) of Panay province. Fajardo is a member of Faculty of Arts at the University of the Philippines in Diliman, Quezon City. She was also the curator of the Vargas Museum of Art located inside the Diliman campus of the University of the Philippines. She was a visiting professor at the St. Norbert College in the United States.

On the other hand, Nena Saguil (died in 1994) expressed her artistry through the use of pen and ink to draw abstract images employing dots, bubble, vortices, and rays, including an imagery of an "enlarged hymen" and "a woman cleaning a toilet bowl splattered with human excrement". Saguil moved to France to live in Paris.

Imelda Cajipe-Endaya ventured in making fragmented artistic scenes by recycling materials found in the household to depict the life and responsibilities of the Filipina domestic helper working in the Philippines and abroad, to integrate their unseen roles as the working wife, mother, and daughter while being miles away from their motherland or from their hometowns in the Philippines.

Paulina Constancia is considered one of the most prolific and inspiring female artists in Cebu, Philippines. She is a multifaceted artist best known for her bright colored, whimsical narratives painted on quilts and tiles that are also reflected in her writing. Paulina has exhibited her art in the Philippines, Indonesia, the Netherlands, Mexico & in various cities in the United States & Canada. In 1997, she was presented by the Philippine Centennial Coordinating Council of Northeast USA in a show called "Here's to Sunny!" at the Philippine Center in New York City. In 2000, her collection of painted quilts called "Kleur en ik in de geheime tuin /Hue & I in a Secret Garden" was presented by the VHC-Vereniging Haarlemmermeer-Cebu (sister cities organization of Haarlemmermeer and Cebu) at the Centrum voor Kunst en Cultuur in Hoofddrop and Kunst 2001 Gallery in Badhoevedorp.

Another noteworthy Filipino woman artist was painter and sculptor Elsie "Inday" Cadapan whose 1997 sculpture was unveiled for display by former Philippine President Corazon Aquino on October 30, 1997, at the front lobby of the Government Service Insurance System (GSIS) building.

== Art as rehabilitation tool ==
On April 21, 2012, the Thomson Reuters Foundation reported that Alma Quinto launched the "House of Comfort Art Project", a program of the House of Comfort Art Network (ARTHOC), a non-governmental organization that uses art to help sexually abused Filipino women and girls through their rehabilitation. The project employs the use of scrap materials to teach women how to create miniature houses, as a means of expressing their feelings long after the occurrence of abuse and build positive experiences in their minds and to once again become in control of their bodies.

== See also ==
- Women in Philippine art
- List of Filipino women artists
