= List of Filipino women artists =

This is a list of women artists who were born in the Philippines or whose artworks are closely associated with that country. These artists also explore issues within the Philippines as well as those experienced by the Filipino diaspora.

== A ==
- Pacita Abad (1946–2004), painter
- Agnes Arellano, Philippine sculptor

== B ==
- Karina Baluyut (active since 2004), painter
- Fatima Baquiran (born 1971), painter
- Norma Belleza (born 1939), painter

== C ==
- Imelda Cajipe-Endaya (born 1949), painter, printmaker, mixed-media installation artist, curator, art project organiser and writer, activist
- Paulina Constancia (born 1970), Filipino-Canadian painter
- Xyza Cruz Bacani (born 1987), Filipina street photographer and documentary photographer

== D ==
- Camille Dela Rosa (born 1982), visual artist
- Kiri Dalena (born 1975), visual artist

== G ==
- Ofelia Gelvezon-Tequi (born June 4, 1944), visual artist

== F ==
- Brenda Fajardo (born 1940), visual artist and printmaker

== J ==
- Geraldine Javier (born 1970), contemporary artist

== L ==
- Lenore RS Lim, printmaker

== M ==
- Lisa Macuja-Elizalde (born 1964), prima ballerina
- Anita Magsaysay-Ho (1914–2012), painter
- Joy Mallari (born 1966), painter, visual artist
- Pelagia Mendoza y Gotianquin (1867–1939), sculptor, first women to study at the Escuela de Dibujo y Pintura
- Maningning Miclat (1972–2000), Chinese-Filipino poet, painter
- Keiye Miranda (active since 1995), painter

== O ==
- Marge Organo, glass artist

== P ==
- Satine Phoenix (born 1980), Filipino-American illustrator, painter, model
- Paz Paterno (1867–1914), Filipino painter

== R ==
- Alice Reyes (born 1942), dancer
- Hannah Reyes Morales (born 1990), photographer

== S ==
- Nena Saguil (1914–1994), visual artist
- Gini Cruz Santos (born 1966), animator
- Maxine Syjuco (born 1984), poet, visual artist

== T ==
- Virginia Ty-Navarro (1924–1996), sculptor

== Z ==
- Carmen Zaragoza y Rojas (1867–1943), painter

== See also ==
- Filipino women artists
