= Ateneo Art Gallery =

University museum in Quezon City, Philippines

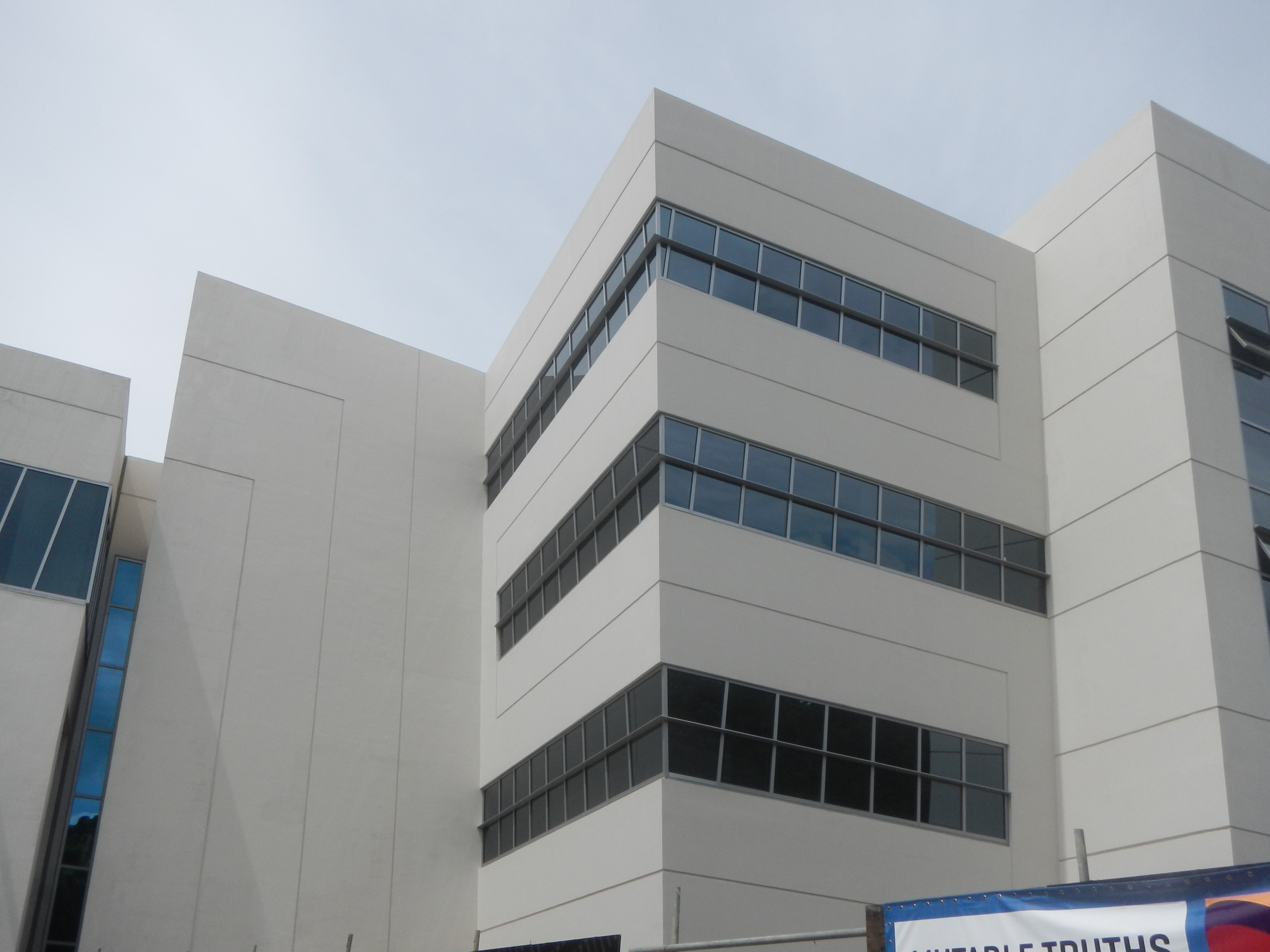
- Established: 1960
- Location: Ateneo de Manila University, Loyola Heights, Quezon City, Philippines
- Coordinates: 14°38′24″N 121°4′38″E
- Type: University museum
- Director: Ma. Victoria "Boots" Herrera
- Website: www.ateneo.edu/aag

The Ateneo Art Gallery is a museum of modern art of the Ateneo de Manila University. It is the first of its kind in the Philippines. It serves as an art resource for the university community and the general public as well. The Gallery is located at the Arts Wing, Areté, Ateneo de Manila University, Katipunan Avenue, Loyola Heights, Quezon City.

Widely recognized today as the first museum of Philippine modern art, The Ateneo Art Gallery was established in 1960 through Fernando Zóbel's bequest to the Ateneo of his collection of works by key Filipino post war artists. Through the years other philanthropists and artists followed Zobel's initiative, filling in the gaps so that the collection now surveys every Philippine art movement in the post war era: from neo-realism and abstract expressionism to today's post-modern hybrid tendencies. The Gallery's fine prints and drawings consist of over 300 works by local and international artists from the Renaissance to the present. The etchings, engravings, woodcuts, lithographs and other graphic-arts media represent over 80 artists, including Rembrandt, Goya, Delacroix, Toulouse-Lautrec and Picasso.

== Collection ==
The Ateneo Art Gallery holds over 500 artworks that include paintings, prints, drawings, sculptures, photographs and posters. The collection traces its roots to the late Fernando Zóbel (1920–1984). Painter, art scholar and teacher at the Ateneo, Zóbel donated over 200 artworks to form a study collection for university students. First housed in Bellarmine Hall in 1961, it moved to the ground floor of Rizal Library in 1967, and moved to the Arts Wing in Areté in 2017.

While the Fernando Zóbel bequest includes works of an earlier generation — notably Fernando Amorsolo and Fabian de la Rosa — it consists of paintings mostly by key postwar modernists, especially those who had exhibited in the now legendary Philippine Art Gallery of the 1950s and 60s. These include Vicente Manansala, Hernando Ocampo, Anita Magsaysay-Ho, Arturo Luz, Cesar Legaspi, Napoleon Abueva, Ang Kiukok and David Medalla.

Through the years, other philanthropists and artists followed Zóbel's initiative to donate works of art to the Gallery, filling gaps in the collection with characteristic pieces by Galo Ocampo and Nena Saguil, among others.

The Gallery is renowned for having the country's most comprehensive collection of works by the social realists of the 1970s and 80s. It also has an active acquisition program to represent key examples of today's postmodern hybrid tendencies in the permanent collection. Contemporary artists represented include Egai Talusan Fernandez, Imelda Cajipe-Endaya and Brenda Fajardo.

Ateneo Areté

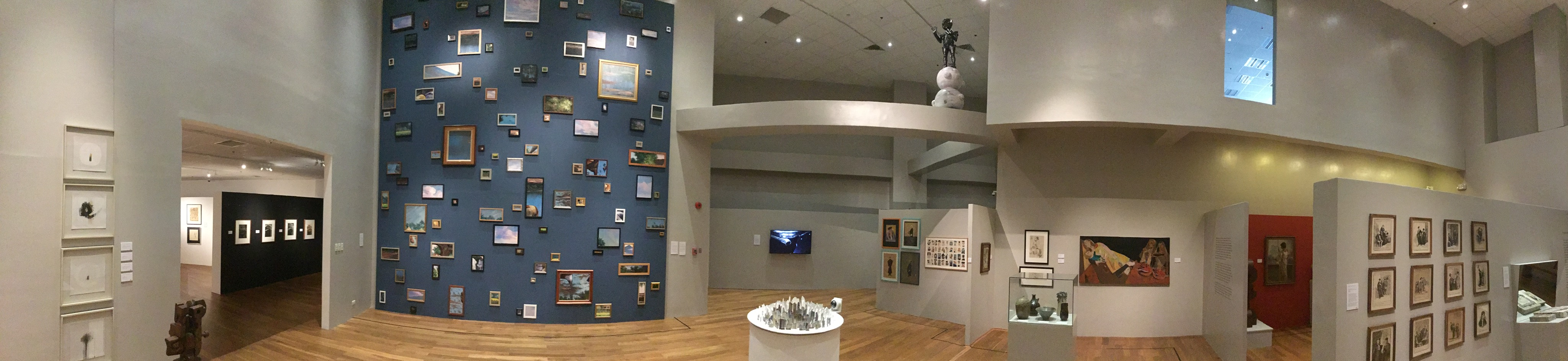
Inside the Ateneo Art Gallery

== Gallery ==
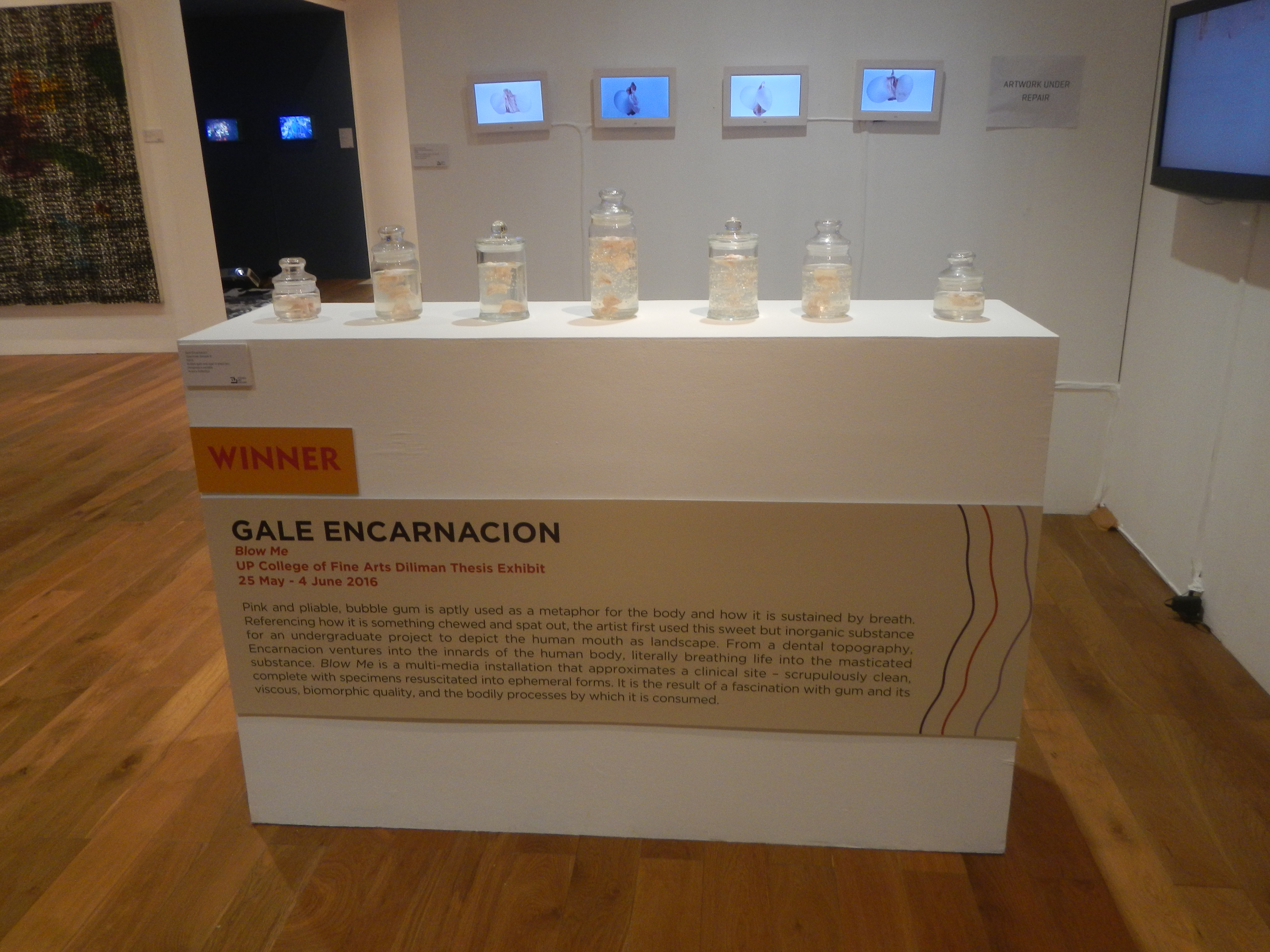

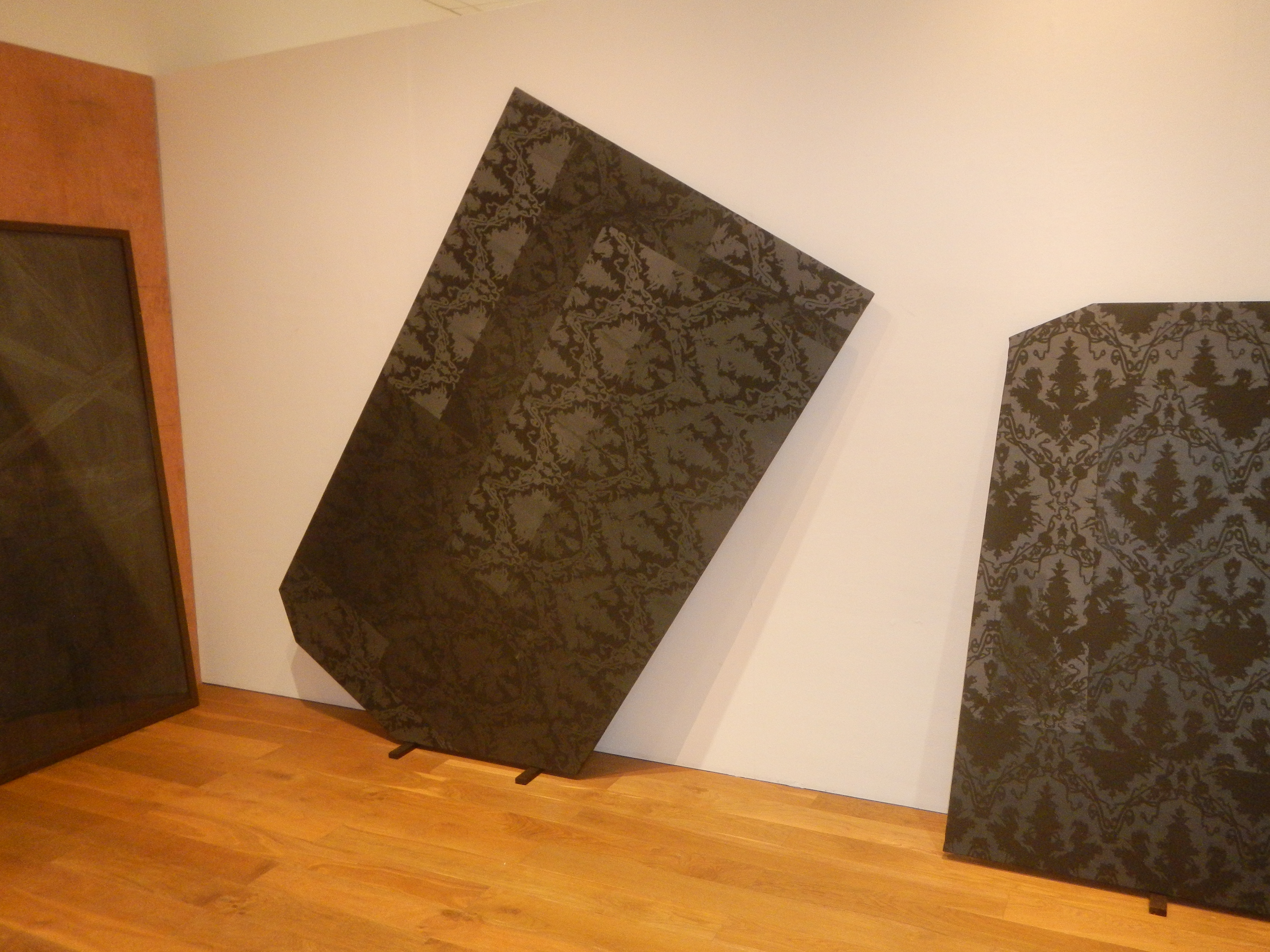

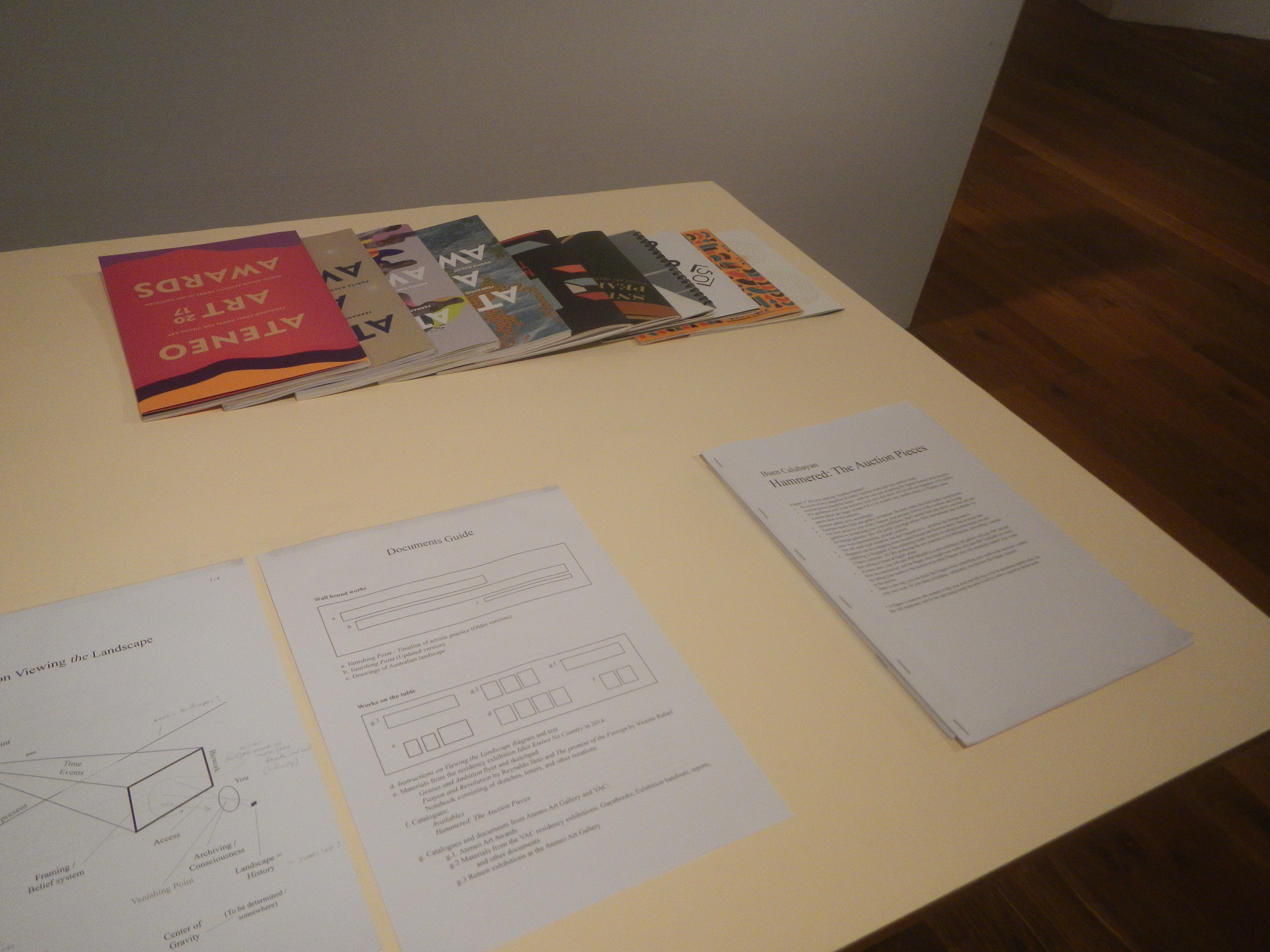
