= Contemporary Art in Asia: Traditions/Tensions =

1996–1997 Contemporary Art Exhibition in the United States

Contemporary Art in Asia: Traditions/Tensions was an exhibition held from 4 October 1996 to 5 January 1997, staged simultaneously in three locations in New York City: the Grey Art Gallery, the Queens Museum of Art, and the Asia Society Galleries. The exhibition was organized by Vishakha N. Desai, director of the Asia Society Galleries, and Thai guest curator Apinan Poshyananda.

The exhibition, first conceived of in 1992, introduced a range of issues and practices that animated new Asian art. It focused on art from urban centers in five Asian countries: India, Indonesia, the Philippines, South Korea, and Thailand. The countries were selected to suggest the diversity of this vast area and the surprising similarity of intent demonstrated by artists from quite different contexts.

The aim of this exhibition was not to define or classify the developments of contemporary Asian art in a fixed way. Rather its goal was to suggest current realities in Asia that made conventional antinomies such as "East/West" or "traditional/modern" somewhat outmoded, as stated by Vishakha N. Desai.

Emphasised by the subtitle "Traditions/Tensions", the participating artists' works confronted issues such as the preservation or eclipse of tradition, increasing globalization, rapid modernization, and changing relationships with the West and within Asia. The key themes were laid out by Grey Art Gallery as "politics, religion, the environment, and women’s issues".

== Participating artists ==
The exhibition included 70 works from 27 artists from Thailand, the Philippines, South Korea, Indonesia, and India. Participating artists included:

- Agnes Arellano
- Arahmaiani
- Araya Rasdjarmrearnsook
- Arpita Singh
- Bhupen Khakhar
- Chatchai PUIPIA
- CHO Duckhyun
- Choi Jeong Hwa
- Dadang Christanto
- F.X. HARSONO
- Heri Dono
- I Wayan Bendi
- Imelda Cajipe-Endaya
- Jakapan Vilasineekul
- Kamol Phaosavasdi
- Kim Hosuk
- Kimsooja
- Montien Boonma
- N. N. Rimzon
- Nalini Malani
- Navin RAWANCHAIKUL
- Nindityo ADIPURNOMO
- Ravinder G. REDDY
- Reamillo & Juliet
- Sanggawa
- Sheela Gowda
- Yun Suknam

The selection was intended to reflect contemporary multicultural and postcolonial perspectives, with what an Artforum review described as "resistance to the hegemonic legacy of Orientalism".
