= Claude Tayag =

Filipino artist, restaurateur and food writer

- Born: Claudio Suarez Tayag; 27 August 1956 (age 70); Angeles, Pampanga, Philippines
- Education: University of the Philippines Diliman (BSc (Econ))
- Occupations: Painter; Sculptor; Chef; Restaurateur; Author; Food critic
- Spouse: Mary Ann Quioc

Claudio Suarez Tayag (born 7 August 1956), more popularly known as Claude Tayag, is a Filipino artist, restaurateur and food writer. He is best known for depicting scenes of impressionistic landscapes and scenes of Philippine folk festivals and religious imagery in his art. In recent years, he has written and been involved with Philippine gastronomy both as renowned chef and as food writer with his weekly column, Turo-Turo (Filipino for pinpoint) on The Philippine Star. A scion of the Tayag family of Pampanga, he is the son of author and journalist Renato D. Tayag.

== Biography and career ==
Tayag was born in Angeles in the province of Pampanga on 7 August 1956 to Renato "Katoks" D. Tayag, a journalist for The Manila Times; and Adoracion Suarez. Tayag married Mary Ann Quioc, a former flight attendant and trainer of Cathay Pacific and have a son Victor Nicolo.

Tayag graduated with a bachelor's degree in economics at the University of the Philippines Diliman, but also undertook several courses in architecture at the same time.

From the circle of friends cultivated by his father, Tayag was surrounded by the noted personalities in the Philippine arts and letters including Emilio Aguilar Cruz, Sofronio Mendoza (SYM), Romulo Galicano, Adrian Cristobal Cruz and Ibarra dela Rosa who will later be collectively known as the Dimasalang Group. His encountering with Aguilar Cruz and others, spawned his oeuvre of painting in plein air leading to his first one-man exhibition at ABC Galleries in Manila in 1978 on his acrylic and watercolor landscapes.

Consequently, in 1979, Tayag encountered the works of French-based Philippine painter Macario Vitalis while doing his travels on an eleven-month travel around Europe. Tayag and Vitalis became acquainted with each and whom he frequently visited in his residence in Plestin-les-Grèves in Brittany.

Subsequently, his paintings revolved on themes ranging from the local festivals in particular the Moriones and the Ati-atihan, Philippine folk religious imagery (better known as santos), landscapes of the Cordillera region and a travelogue of sceneries in Europe and Japan from 1979 to 1980. By 1990, Tayag delved towards woodwork and sculpture by forming sculptures delving in waves and abstractions by means of wood lamination. His sculptures and his wood furniture are mainly reminiscent of the works of Constantin Brâncuși and Alexander Calder.

In 1989, after receiving a grant from the Cultural Center of the Philippines (CCP), Tayag made a large-scale black and white sumi painting known as Black Mountain which was later mounted in the lobby of the Little Theater of the CCP. The painting however was destroyed in a fire in the late 1990s.

Tayag has actively participated in several one-man and group exhibitions in the Philippines, China, the United States, and Spain, where he exhibited with both Filipino, Southeast Asian and Spanish artists.

In 2003, he held a three-man show with Ben Cabrera and Patis Tesoro in a museum in his hometown, Angeles. Other Filipino artists who exhibited in group shows with him include Ofelia Gelvezon-Tequi, Phyllis Zaballero, Soler Santos, Abdulmari Imao, and Sajid Imao. Tayag also participated in the 20th Asian International Art Exhibition at the Ayala Museum in 2005.

In 2011, along with co-curator Ofelia Gelvezon-Tequi, Tayag curated the retrospective of the early works of French-based Philippine painter Vitalis at the Total Gallery space of the Alliance Française de Manille in Makati from 1 to 31 March 2011.

=== Public collections ===
Tayag's work is displayed in numerous public and private collections, including:

- Bank of the Philippine Islands Collection (BPI)
- Bangko Sentral ng Pilipinas Collection (BSP)
- Metropolitan Museum of Manila
- Paulino and Hetty Que Collection
- Philippine Long Distance Telephone Company Collection (PLDT)

== Bibliography ==
Books and Publications

- Imahen: A Folio of Philippine Folk Santos (1989)
- Food Tour: A Culinary Journal (2006) (with foreword by Ambeth Ocampo)
- Kulinarya: A Guidebook to Philippine Cuisine (2008) (co-authored with Conrad Calalang, Glenda Barretto, Jessie Sincioco, Margarita Fores and Myrna Segismundo)
- Linamnam: Eating One's Way Around the Philippines (2014) (co-authored with Mary-Ann Quioc-Tayag)
- The Ultimate Filipino Adobo: Stories through the Ages (2022) (co-authored with Michaela Fenix and Ige Ramos)

Contributor in Books and Other Publications

- Vintage Vitalis: Paintings and Drawings (1930-1965) (2011)
- E. Aguilar Cruz: Stories and Sketches Drawn from Memory (2022) (edited by Larry J. Cruz)
