= Balaybay@kasibulan.net =

Balaybay@kasibulan.net is an exhibition focusing on Kasibulan, the first and longest running feminist arts organization founded by contemporary women artists in the Philippines. It is considered a critical attempt to create a collective biography of this organization. The exhibition explores the issues around home, body, self-portraiture, and regional representation, which are central to Kasibulan's efforts to position itself in relation to the centers of art and power. Curated by feminist scholar Flaudette May Datuin, the exhibition featured the work of over fifty artists, and ran from June 10 to July 25, 2004, at the Cultural Center of the Philippines Main Gallery in Manila.

== Concept ==
The exhibition title draws on two root words: "balay" and "bay." The first word means "house" in Ilocano and Hiligaynon, two Austronesian languages spoken in the Philippines. The second word is short for babaylan, an ancient pre-colonial Philippines priestess with healing powers, which is referred to as a model for Southeast Asian feminist discourse. Bound together by art, feminism, and shared political struggle against the Marcos dictatorship, Kasibulan's feminist discourse shone focus on the babaylan on the occasion of this exhibition.

Kasibulan was founded in 1987 by artists Ida Bugayong, Imelda Cajipe-Endaya, Brenda Fajardo, and Ana Fer, in 1987, following the People Power Revolution. The organization's name stands for "Kababaihan sa Sining at Bagong Sibol na Kamalayan" or Women in Art and New Consciousness.

== Artists ==
The exhibition features works by over 50 artists, working on a wide range of styles, mediums, and based in different cities and regions of the Philippines, such as Cebu, Iligan, Bohol, and Dumaguete, as well as those who reside abroad.
