= Salvador Araneta =

Filipino nationalist (1902–1982)

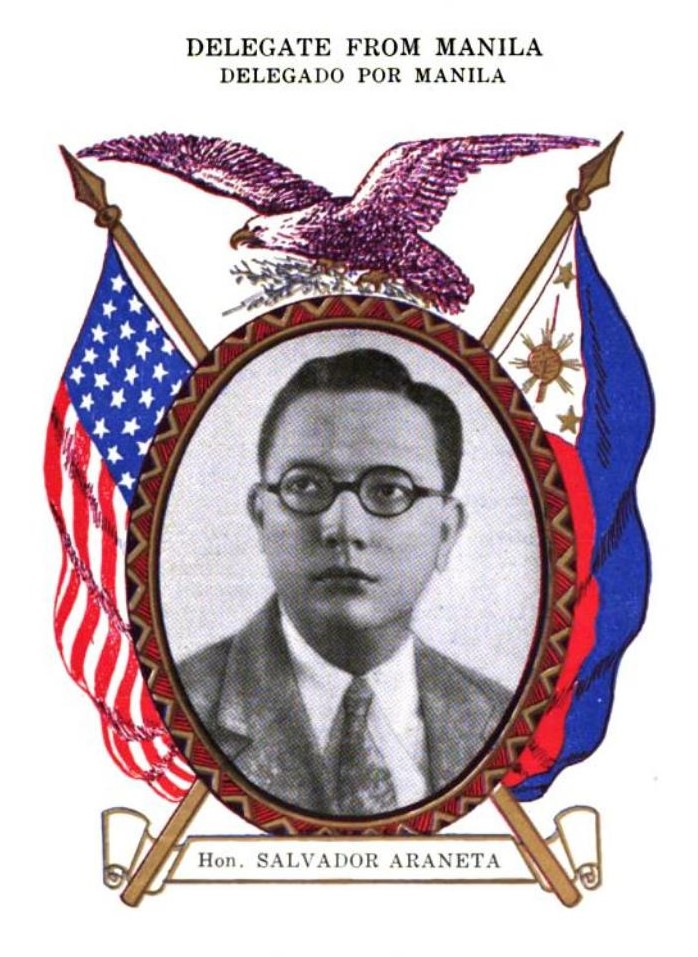
- Araneta as a delegate to the Philippine Constitutional Convention, published by Benipayo Press (c. 1935)

Secretary of Agriculture and Natural Resources
- In office March 10, 1954 – August 13, 1955
- President: Ramon Magsaysay
- Preceded by: Placido Mapa
- Succeeded by: Juan G. Rodriguez

Personal details
- Born: Salvador Araneta y Zaragoza; January 31, 1902 Quiapo, Manila, Philippine Islands
- Died: October 7, 1982 (aged 80) San Juan, Metro Manila, Philippines

Salvador Araneta y Zaragoza (January 31, 1902 – October 7, 1982) was a Filipino nationalist, constitutionalist, politician, civil servant, lawyer, educator, economist, businessman, industrialist, environmentalist, and philanthropist.

== Early life and education ==
Araneta was born in Manila on January 31, 1902 and was the second son of Gregorio Araneta y Soriano and Carmen Zaragoza y Rojas. His father was a close colleague of Trinidad Pardo de Tavera since he belonged to the Federalista Party, a group in favor of American annexation of the country.

Araneta pursued his higher education at Ateneo de Manila, receiving his Bachelor of Arts degree in Liberal Arts, magna cum laude, in 1918. Then at the University of Santo Tomas, he earned his Bachelor’s of Laws degree (licenciado en derecho meritissimus) and passed the bar exam in 1922. He also earned a scholarship and pursued postgraduate law studies at the prestigious Harvard University, where Salvador Araneta earned his Master’s of Laws degrees in Constitutional Law and Commercial Law.

== Politics and government service ==
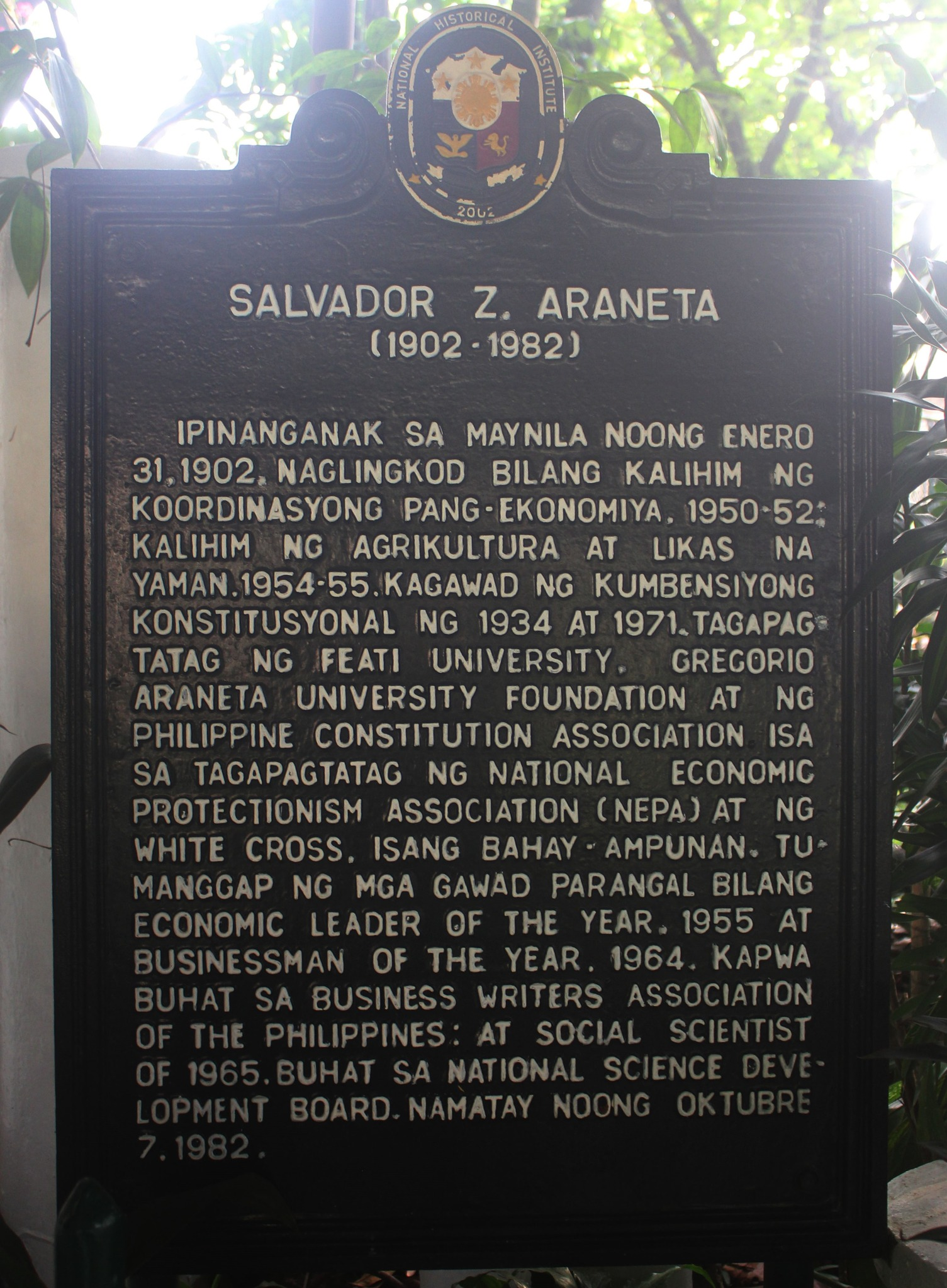
Historical marker installed by the National Historical Institute to commemorate Salvador Araneta

He was a member of the Philippine Constitutional Convention of 1934 and 1971 and founder and twice president of the Philippine Constitution Association. During the 1934 convention that led to the creation of the constitution of the Commonwealth of the Philippines, Araneta opposed provisions granting the President, the right to suspend the writ of habeas corpus as part of his military powers, preferring instead to grant this to the National Assembly and in its absence, to the President, but only with the consent of a majority of justices in the Supreme Court. He later supported the granting of a Dominion status for the Philippines from the United States.

Araneta was a supporter of Keynesian economics in his outlook on the Philippine economy. During the presidency of Manuel Roxas, Araneta was a staunch critic of the Bell Trade Act, which he criticized as keeping the Philippines economically subservient to the United States and was spearheaded by the interests of the financial establishment, particularly those in the sugar industry. Araneta served as Secretary of Economic Coordination under President Elpidio Quirino in 1948, but resigned in 1952 after clashing with Finance Secretary and later Central Bank of the Philippines Governor Miguel Cuaderno due to differences in economic and monetary policy and opposing Philippine sugar exports to Japan. He returned to the cabinet as Secretary of Agriculture under President Ramon Magsaysay and as a member of the National Economic Council. As agriculture secretary, Araneta oversaw the creation of the Agricultural Tenancy Commission, a forerunner of the Department of Agrarian Reform; the Philippine Tobacco Administration, which became the National Tobacco Administration; and the Philippine Coconut Administration, which became the Philippine Coconut Authority.

== Philanthropy ==
As an educator, he founded Gregorio Araneta University Foundation, the first private agricultural school after World War II, endowed the university with one-sixth of his personal wealth, and turned it into a foundation. He also founded FEATI University to train engineers and mechanics for Far Eastern Air Transportation, Inc., the first airline that operated after the war, serving China and San Francisco.

Araneta dedicated his life to uplifting the moral and social values of society and sought property ownership and capitalism for all. These he embodied in a draft constitution, the Bayanikasan Constitution, published in 1980 to be adopted in 10 to 20 years.

== Business ==
Araneta pioneered in the flour industry, establishing the RFM Corporation in 1958, in soy bean extraction (Republic Soya), in the manufacture of electric motors (FEATI Industries), animal feeds (AIA Feed Mills), animal vaccines (AIA Biological Laboratories). He was co-founder of the National Economic Protectionism Association (NEPA), the Philippine Rural Reconstruction Movement (PRRM), and the White Cross, an orphanage.

== Personal life and death ==
Araneta was married to Victoria Lopez. One of their daughters, Maria Victoria, married Jose Concepcion Jr., who eventually succeeded his father-in-law as head of RFM.

Following the declaration of martial law by President Ferdinand Marcos in 1972, Araneta went on a self-imposed exile in the United States, settling in San Francisco, and later in Canada, particularly in Vancouver. He died on October 7, 1982, at the age of 80.
