= Ofelia Gelvezon-Tequi =

Filipina printmaker and painter (born 1942)

- Born: Ofelia Gelvezon; June 4, 1942 (age 84); Guimbal, Iloilo, Philippines
- Education: University of Philippines, Accademia di Belle Arti di Roma, Pratt Institute
- Occupation: Visual artist
- Spouse: Marc Tequi
- Children: 3
- Writing career
- Genres: Printmaker, painter
- Website: gelvezontequi.com

Ofelia Gelvezon-Tequi (born June 4, 1942) is a Filipina visual artist based in France. She works primarily in the media of painting and printmaking and is considered a pioneer in Philippine printmaking. Her prints are created using copper-plate etching and viscosity color printing techniques.

== Early life and education ==
Gelvezon-Tequi was born June 4, 1942, in Guimbal, Iloilo, Philippines. Her family moved around during her childhood due to her father's employment in the Philippine Army. During her childhood she lived in Paco, Iloilo, and Lucena.

Gelvezon-Tequi graduated from the University of Philippines-Diliman with degrees in English (1966) and Fine Arts (1964). She continued her education at the Accademia di Belle Arti di Roma, earning a diploma in painting in 1967. A scholarship from the Rockefeller Foundation enabled her to study graphic arts at the Pratt Institute.

== Artistic style and works ==
Many of Gelvezon-Tequi's works explore women's central and varied roles in society Other themes include the intertwined existence of the sacred with everyday objects, emotions, aspects of family life and work, and political realities. Many of her works incorporate allegorical symbolism and draw inspiration from literature, philosophy, and art history, including Catholic iconography inherited via Spanish colonialism and Malay spiritual beliefs, such as the use of amulets in anting-anting.

Gelvezon-Tequi has also spoken about the importance the concept of justice and giving voice to the voiceless plays in her art. Some of her pieces are blatantly political, including one depicting a former Philippine president wearing a virtual reality headset, oblivious to the impoverished material reality faced by the woman and children who stand nearby, in the background. A set of 1987 highly-political triptychs entitled Homage to Ambrogio Lorenzetti, Homage II to Ambrogio Lorenzetti, and Homage III to Ambrogio Lorenzetti contrasts the virtues of benevolent rulers, good governments, and the social prosperity these create with the vices of tyrannical leaders, their dysfunctional governments, and the dystopian social situations created as a result.

Gelvezon-Tequi described her printmaking as an improvisatory process in which the artist encountered visual surprises which, then, guide them in certain directions. Of this process she explained: "You have to be humble and accept that you cannot control everything. Sometimes, it turns out better than what you have planned before."

Her 2020 exhibition, Allegories and Realities, a retrospective of Gelvezon-Tequi's half a century-long career featured 219 of her works, including a series of lesser known silk paintings.

Her work has been grouped with other Filipino artists, like Imelda Cajipe-Endaya, Ben Cabrera, and Brenda Fajardo, for creating new ways for Filipinos to understand their history within the context of colonialism as well as imagine new narratives outside this context.

She has taught art history, printmaking, and book design at the University of the Philippines as well as served as Director for the Art Association of the Philippines.

== Personal life ==
Since 2005, she has lived with her husband, Marc Téqui, in the rural village of Limeuil, France where, in the 1990s, they bought a 17th-century house built on top of a 13th-century cellar.

Gelvezon-Tequi and Marc Tequi, a former French instructor, met at the University of Philippines-Diliman Faculty Center. The couple raised three children: a daughter and two sons. She makes frequent return visits to her native Philippines and chooses to create art primarily for Filipino audiences.

== Selected exhibitions ==
- 2020 Allegories and Realities, Ofelia Gelvezon-Tequi: In Retrospect, Cultural Center of the Philippines, Pasay, Philippines
- 2018 Shifts in Context, National Museum of Fine Arts, Manila, Philippines
- 2015 Philippine Madonna, The Crucible Art Gallery, 4/L, The Artwalk, SM Megamall, Mandaluyong
- 2002 Contemporary Filipino Artists, The Foreign Correspondents' Club, Hong Kong
- 2000-2002 Faith and the City: A Survey of Contemporary Filipino Art, Earl Lu Gallery Lasalle-SIA College of the Arts, Singapore; National Art Gallery of Malaysia, Kuala Lumpur, Malaysia; ABN AMRO House, Georgetown, Malaysia; The Art Center, Chulalongkorn University, Bangkok, Thailand; Metropolitan Museum of Manila, Manila, Philippines
- 1996 The CCP at the MET, Metropolitan Museum of Manila
- 1972 Thirteen Artists, Cultural Center of the Philippines

== Awards ==
- 2002 Michiko Takamatsu Prize, Salon des Artistes Français
- 2014 Pamana ng Pilipino Award
- 2002 Lucien and Suzanne Jonas Prize, Salon des Artistes Français, Paris
- 1982 Art Association of the Philippines, gold medal for printmaking
- 1972 Thirteen Artists Award, Cultural Center of the Philippines

== See also ==
- List of Filipino women artists
