= Nena Saguil =

Filipina abstract artist (1914–1994)

- Born: Simplicia Laconico Saguil; 19 September 1914; Santa Cruz, Laguna, Philippine Islands
- Died: 17 February 1994 (aged 79); Paris, France
- Education: University of the Philippines
- Occupations: Painting; printmaking; drawing
- Style: Abstract art
- Awards: Presidential Medal of Merit (Philippines)

Nena Saguil (September 19, 1914 – February, 1994) was a Filipina artist of modernist and abstract paintings and ink drawings. She was most known for her cosmic, organic, and spiritual abstract works depicting internal landscapes of feeling and imagination. For these, Saguil is considered a pioneer of Filipino abstract art.

== Life and career ==
Simplicia "Nena" Laconico Saguil was born on September 19, 1914, in Santa Cruz, Laguna, Philippines, to Epifanio Saguil and Remedios Laconico. Her father was a private physician to the country's second president, Manuel Quezon. One of ten children, Saguil was brought up in a conservative Catholic household.

Saguil rejected the Catholic school education her parents desired for her. She received her education at University of the Philippines School of Fine Arts where she studied under Fernando Amorsolo, a conservative painter and teacher who adhered to the Philippine art canon of the time. She graduated from UP in 1933 with a Certificate in Painting. She received her undergraduate degree in 1949, after the Philippines gained its independence following the end of World War II.

Saguil's first solo exhibition occurred in 1950 at the newly opened Philippine Art Gallery (P.A.G.) where she also volunteered and met with modernist artists like Vicente Manansala, Hernando Ruiz Ocampo, Arturo Luz, Romeo Tabuena, Anita Magsaysay-Ho and Fernando Zobel. In his review of the 7th Annual Art Association of the Philippines exhibition, Fernando Zobel de Ayala declared that the Filipino "moderns ... seemed to carry the day both in quantity and quality." Among them, he praised the Saguil and Victor Oteyza for the originality of their works. This network of Filipino modernist artists to which Saguil belonged became known as the "Neo-Realist Group"

In 1954, at the age of 40, Saguil left the Philippines for Spain after receiving a scholarship to study abstract painting. Two years later, she moved to Paris to continue her studies at the Ecole des Artes Americane.

For almost two decades, she pursued her art while living a reclusive life in a small Paris apartment and working housekeeping and other odd jobs to support herself, rather than return to her family, friends and the comfortable life she had lived in her homeland.

Her first European solo exhibit happened in Paris in 1957 at the Galerie Raymond Creuze and featured her new abstract style of lines and geometric shapes. Along with Vicente Manansala, Saguil also exhibited at the 1958 Spanish-American Biennale in Cuba.

Upon her return to the Philippines in 1968, Saguil exhibited at the Solidaridad Galleries, showcasing her abstract style and establishing herself as a leading abstractionist in the country.

Later in life, Saguil became a Jehovah's Witness. Saguil died in Paris in February, 1994.

Several galleries honored Saguil with posthumous exhibitions, including the Lopez Museum, the Cultural Center of the Philippines, and the Ateneo Art Gallery. The Ateneo Art Gallery's 2003 exhibit, Landscapes and Inscapes: From the Material World to the Spiritual, was accompanied by a book of the same name.

In 2006, President Gloria Macapagal-Arroyo posthumously awarded Saguil the Presidential Medal of Merit.

== Artistic style ==
During her time at UP, in the early 1930s and after World War II, Saguil created impressionistic and naturalistic figurative works, including landscapes and still lifes. She also became enamored with the work of Pablo Picasso and painted "surrealistic and cubistic compositions of Philippine scenes". In taking up a more abstract style after 1950, Saguil experimented with many techniques to achieve various shapes, textures, and relief. These techniques included employing syringes to paint her famous circular forms and dots, rubbing coffee grounds on her works, and fashioning circular canvases.

Saguil's circular and organic oval forms simultaneously evoke microscopic and macrocosmic natural landscapes. Her works appear as "biological tissues and net[s] of nerves" as well as "cosmological spheres, orbs, elliptics and terrestrial mandalas. ... as though stating that human existence and the universe are mutually encompassing". Another writer reveled in Saguil's "subtly iridescent and translucent hues of moonstones, opals and fine jade, as well as the ovoid shapes of the singing celestial spheres". Her later works have also been described as infused with spiritual feeling.

Relating Saguil's cosmic vision to feminism, Quijon stated that, "If gender is wrought by matrices of labour and sociality, it is also imbricated in the history of abstraction, as disclosure of a cosmic world." A recently unearthed Saguil watercolor, depicting a Filipina Lady Liberty, was painted in 1947, to commemorate the second anniversary of Philippine Independence and more directly encompasses feminist themes. Modeled after Delacroix's Liberty Leading the People, the painting features a bare-breasted Filipina holding a Philippine flag in her right hand and a large palm leaf, symbolic of peace and Christianity, in her left. The painting departed from Delacroix's in presenting a Liberty bearing no weapons and contrasted with more masculinist renderings of Philippine independence.
