= Francisco E. Baisas =

Entomologist (1896–1973)

- Born: June 4, 1896; Paete, Laguna
- Died: May 24, 1973 (aged 76); Madisonville, Kentucky
- Resting place: Bapistery of Saint James the Apostle Parish Church, Paete, Laguna
- Education: Laguna High School
- Alma mater: University of the Philippines
- Known for: Dean of Philippine Culicidologist
- Spouse: Crispina Calingo
- Relatives: Imelda Cajipe-Endaya (granddaughter)

Francisco Edlagan Baisas (June 4, 1896 – May 24, 1973) was a Philippine entomologist regarded as the "Dean of Philippine Culicidologists" whose "contributions to the knowledge of Philippine mosquitoes is without measure". His passing was described as the end of "an era which saw the elucidation of the malaria vectors of the Philippines and great progress made in the control of a disease which had accounted for as many as 2,000,000 cases annually in those islands."

He pioneered the study of mosquitoes in the Philippines. His taxonomic studies of 71 new species dating back to 1927 enhanced the development of mosquito systematics and established the knowledge base for these winged vectors of the highly infectious tropical disease, malaria. His works contributed greatly to the control of malaria, severe cases of which even today can lead to death – 627,000 in 2012 alone according to the Bill and Melinda Gates Foundation. The first Filipino to be trained as a malaria technician by the International Health Division of the Rockefeller Foundation, Baisas later was employed as an entomologist by the US Army's 3rd General Medical Laboratory and the Philippine's Institute of Malariology under whose auspices he conducted most of his life work. In 1955, the Philippine Government named him among the country's Ten Outstanding Scientists, awarding him a gold medal and a Diploma of Honor for his contributions to the study of malaria and mosquitoes in the Philippines.

An acclaimed author who published scholarly scientific works for most of his adult life, his publications are archived at the Smithsonian Institution in Washington DC where specimen plates of the mosquito species he discovered and therefore carry his name are also preserved (catalogued as "F. Baisas Scientific Works, Smithsonian, Washington DC, South East Asia Mosquito Project, NHB455"). Some of his works, were also published by the Chicago Natural History Museum (now the Field Museum). He continued his work in retirement, establishing his now defunct Baisas Entomological Research Laboratory in the backyard of his home in Pasig, a Manila suburb, where he wrote his perhaps most voluminous publication, the highly illustrated, 300-page downloadable book entitled The Mosquito Fauna of Subic Bay Naval Reservation, published in the early 1970s, which details the taxonomy of 90 mosquito species and subspecies in this area alone. The mosquito species named after him are often the subject vector of research studies on malaria being carried out to this day in laboratories all over the world, e.g., Anopheles baisasi among others, and often cited in the title and body of research papers on mosquito taxonomy and the prevention of malaria.

Francisco E. Baisas died in 1973, within a little more than a year of his beloved wife Crispina's unexpected death in Madisonville, Kentucky where he and his wife of nearly 60 years spent the last 3 years of their lives with one of their eight children, all of whom were accomplished professionals.

== Personal life ==
He was born in the Philippines in the arts-and-crafts town of Paete, Laguna on June 4, 1896, the younger of two children of Lorenzo Baisas, a farmer who tilled his own land, and his wife Juana Edlagan. He died in Madisonville, Kentucky on May 24, 1973. He married Crispina Calingo of Pateros, Rizal, and Paete, Laguna in 1913. One of her grandchildren is Imelda Cajipe-Endaya, the first Filipina to be declared a National Artist of the Philippines for Visual Arts.

== Education ==
1934 University of the Philippines: Bachelor of Arts, major in Zoology / Bachelor of Science in Entomology with meritorious grades.

== Works ==
Of Baisas' 35 known scholarly publications, according to the OCLC WorldCat Organization, the following are among the most widely held works published, some in several editions, between 1935 and 1974 and held by WorldCat member libraries worldwide:

1. The mosquito fauna of Subic Bay Naval Reservation, Republic of the Philippines by Francisco Edlagan Baisas
2. Notes on Philippine mosquitoes : XVI. Genus Trupteroides by Francisco Edlagan Baisas
3. A practical illustrated key to larvae of Philippine Anopheles by P.F Russell and Francisco Edlagan Baisas
4. Notes on Philippine mosquitoes by Francisco Edlagan Baisas
5. Notes on Philippine Mosquitoes-XI : a new species of Tripteroides by Francisco Edlagan Baisas
6. Studies of the ecology of clark ab, central luzon, r.p. ii. a comprehensive mosquito survey
7. The technic of handling mosquitoes by P.F Russell and Francisco Edlagan Baisas
8. Notes on Philippine mosquitoes : XVI : four new species of Zeugnomyia by Francisco Edlagan Baisas
9. A practical illustrated key to adults of Philippine Anopheles by Paul Farr Russell and Francisco Edlagan Baisas
10. Anopheles hyrcanus var. sinensis of the Philippines and certain parts of China, with some comments on Anopheles hyrcanus var. nigerrimus of the Philippines by Francisco Edlagan Baisas

== Mosquito species named after Baisas ==
Some of species of mosquitos were named after Baisas including:

- Aedes baisasi,
- Anopheles baisasi
- Anopheles balabacensis Baisas
- Anopheles introlatus Baisas
- Armigeres (Armigeres) baisasi,
- Culex baisasi
- Ochlerotatus baisasi
