= Gregorio S. Araneta =

Filipino lawyer and businessman

Gregorio Araneta
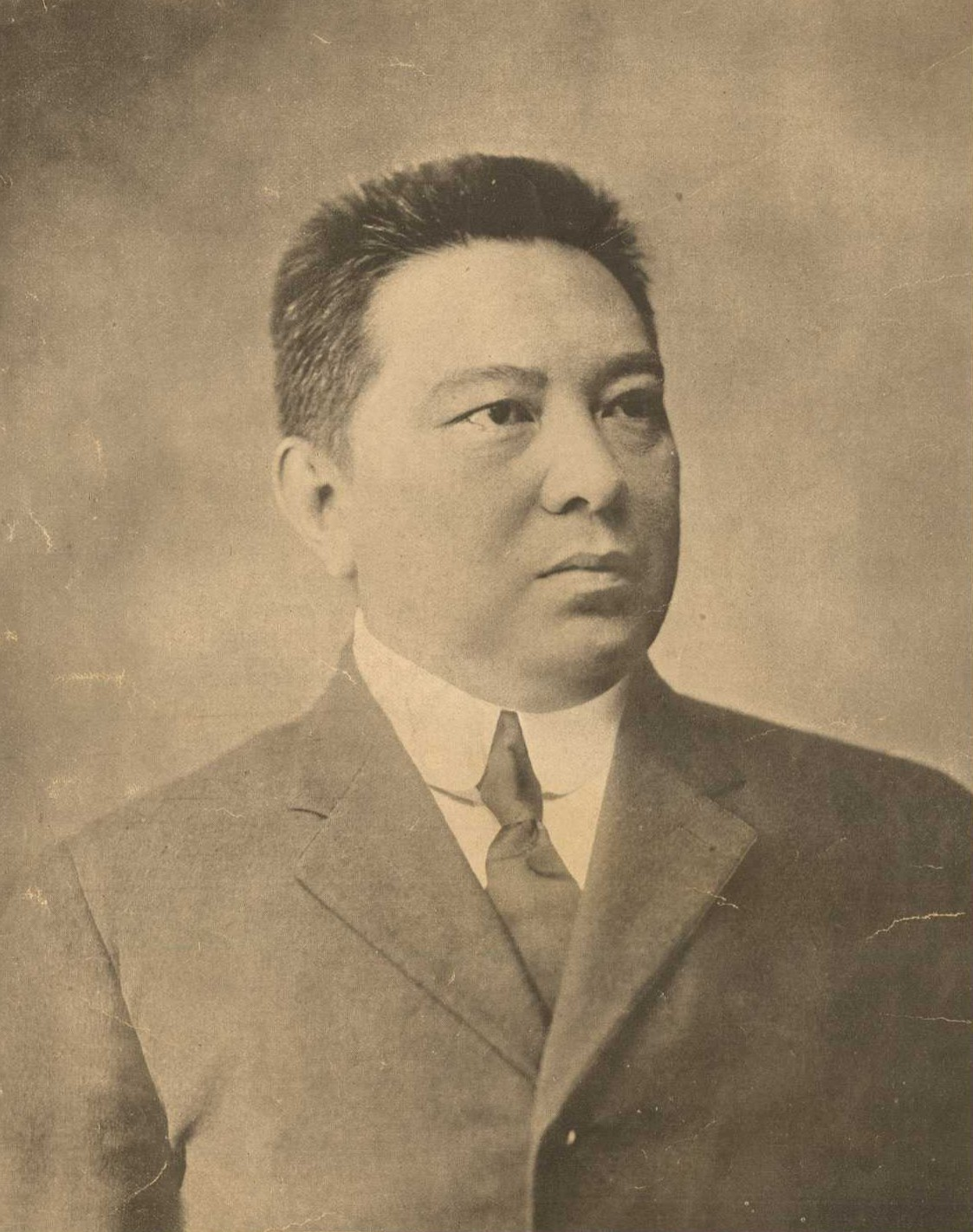

Member of Philippine Commission
- In office February 25, 1909 – October 27, 1913

Secretary of Finance and Justice
- In office July 1, 1908 – October 10, 1913
- Appointed by: Governor-General James Francis Smith
- Preceded by: Henry C. Ide
- Succeeded by: Victorino Mapa

Attorney General of the Philippines
- In office July 16, 1906 – July 1, 1908
- Preceded by: Lebbeus R. Wilfley
- Succeeded by: Ignacio Villamor

Solicitor-General of the Philippines
- In office June 15, 1901 – July 16, 1906
- Preceded by: Office created
- Succeeded by: Ignacio Villamor

Secretary of the Malolos Congress
- In office September 15, 1898 – November 13, 1899

Secretary of Justice
- In office September 1, 1897 – May 19, 1899
- President: Emilio Aguinaldo
- Preceded by: Severino de las Alas
- Succeeded by: Florentino Torres

Personal details
- Born: Gregorio Araneta y Soriano; April 19, 1869 Molo, Iloilo, Captaincy General of the Philippines
- Died: May 9, 1930 (aged 61) Manila, Philippine Islands
- Resting place: La Loma Cemetery
- Spouse: Carmen Zaragoza y Rojas (m. 1896)
- Children: 14, including Salvador
- Education: University of Santo Tomas
- Occupation: Lawyer and businessman

Don Gregorio Soriano Araneta (born Gregorio Araneta y Soriano; April 19, 1869 – May 9, 1930) was a Filipino lawyer, businessman, and nationalist, during the Spanish and American colonial periods.

== Early life and career ==
In 1891, he graduated from the University of Santo Tomas with a degree in law. He defended prominent Filipinos accused of financially supporting the Katipunan.

In May 1898, Araneta was appointed member of the 21-man Consultative Assembly, which the Spanish Governor-General of the Philippines Basilio Agustin formed in an attempt to rally Filipinos to the Spanish side of the Spanish–American War. This assembly, however, failed.

=== Aguinaldo's Cabinet ===
Araneta participated in the drafting of the Malolos Constitution. He resigned as Secretary and accepted his appointment as Justice of the Ministry of Justice.

=== Supreme Court ===
On January 25, 1899, the Diplomatic Corps of the First Philippine Republic was organized and Araneta was among those appointed as member but he chose to abandon the revolutionary government. Months after the Philippine–American War broke out, America established the civil courts in the Philippines. In May 1899, General Elwell Otis appointed Araneta as Associate Justice of the Philippine Supreme Court, the youngest to occupy the position at 30 years old. Araneta's sympathies became clearer when he joined the Federal Party that favored America's annexation of the Philippines.

=== Bureau of Justice ===
On June 15, 1901, he was appointed Solicitor General. When Attorney General Lebbeus R. Wilfley accepted a post in China, Araneta was made his successor. He took his oath of office as Attorney General on July 16, 1906. Two years after, July 1, 1908, he was appointed to the Philippine Commission and at the same time Secretary of Justice and Finance. He was the first Filipino to hold a sensitive post, being a commissioner with portfolio. He resigned from government service on October 10, 1913. With Salvador Zaragoza, he established a law office, which attracted many clients.

== Later career ==
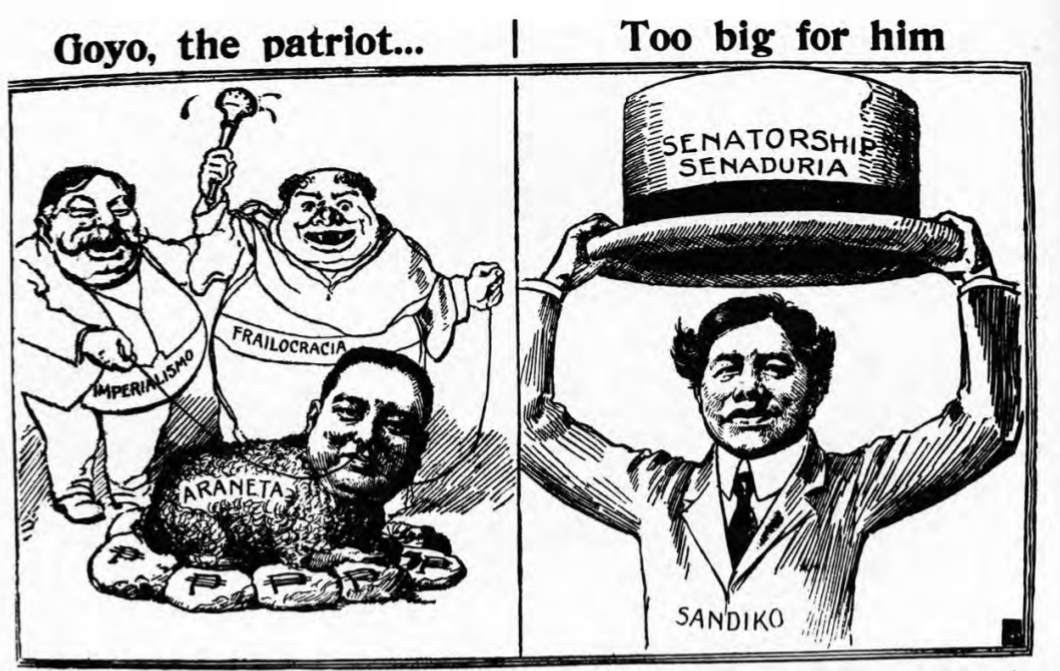
Cartoon by The Independent mocking Gregorio Araneta (left) being an ally of Teodoro Sandiko (right) for the 1916 senatorial election, published September 16, 1916

During the first Senatorial election in 1916, he ran for a seat in the Senate but lost to Rafael Palma. In 1916, The Independent, mocked Araneta for defending Spanish friars to reoccupy Filipino parishes and being an "imperialist" while serving as Solicitor-General under Governor General William Howard Taft. That same year, he accepted a teaching post in the University of Santo Tomas and at the same attended to his private law practice. Araneta convinced the Supreme Court to reverse its previous decision on two cases. Araneta also gained respect for his ethical principles. He turned down the offer of House Speaker Sergio Osmeña to seat as Chief Justice of the Supreme Court in favor of Manuel Araullo, who he thought to be more deserving for the post. He was again offered the same position during the time of Senate President Manuel L. Quezon but he also declined, this time for delicadeza, because he was then involved in a case pending before the Supreme Court.

== Personal life ==
Araneta married Carmen Zaragoza y Rojas on March 7, 1896. The couple had 14 children: Carmen, Jose, Salvador, Consuelo, Paz, Rosa, Antonio, Teresa, Ramon, Vicente, Conchita, Margarita, Luis and Francisco.

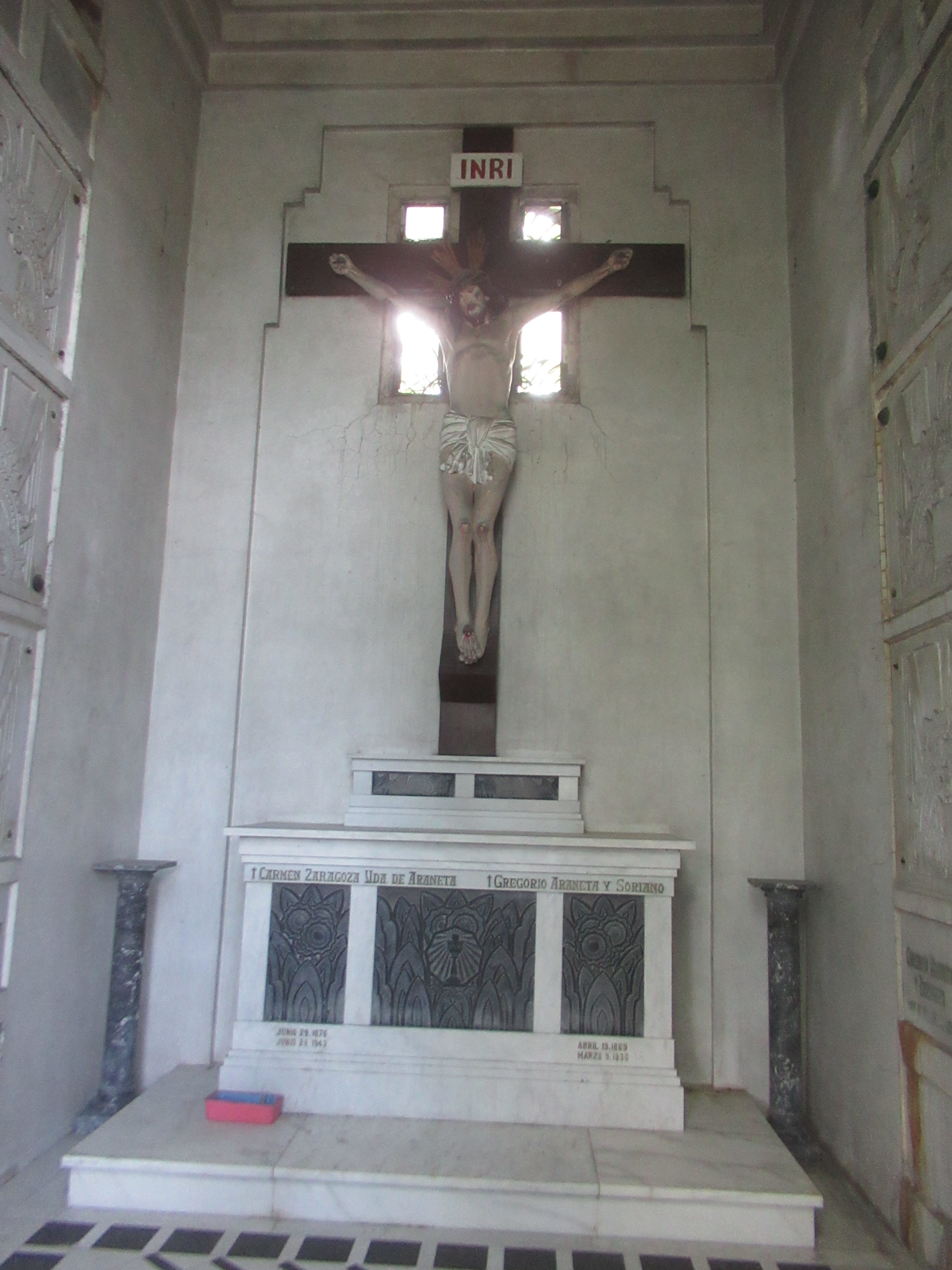
Gregorio Soriano Araneta & Carmen Zaragoza y Rojas' graves at La Loma Cemetery.

== Death ==
He died on May 9, 1930, of myocardial infarction. His remains were interred at the La Loma Cemetery on the next day.
