= Egai Talusan Fernandez =

Filipino painter (1955–2024)

Edgar "Egai" Talusan Fernandez (January 20, 1955 – February 27, 2024) was a Filipino socialist-realist painter.

== Biography ==
His art style was noted for portraying the Philippines as "a multi-ethnic country that is still embroiled in social issues such as civil conflicts." Active in the Philippine art scene from the 1970s onwards, he was particularly known for his activist art which criticized the dictatorship of former Philippine President Ferdinand Marcos.

Fernandez studied advertising at the Philippine Women's University under the mentorship of renowned Philippine abstractionists Lee Aguinaldo and Justin Nuyda, who helped influence his early style. His developing affiliation with activist groups eventually led to him becoming one of the founders of the Kaisahan group, which would become one of the bastions for Social Realism in the country.

Fernandez's style as a social realist painter was largely defined by his iconography depicting the many trials plaguing Philippine society.

Fernandez died on February 27, 2024, at the age of 68.

== Solo exhibitions ==
- Modular Paintings, Ateneo Art Gallery, Philippines, 1975
- Reflections, National Commission for Culture and the Arts Gallery, Philippines, 2012
- Sound of Silence: Remembering Martial Law, National Commission for Culture and the Arts Gallery, Philippines, 2016
