= Victorio Edades =

Filipino painter (1895–1985)

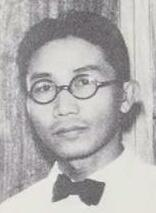
- Edades in 1939
- Born: Victorio Cándido Edades y Edades; December 23, 1895; Dagupan, Pangasinan, Captaincy General of the Philippines
- Died: March 7, 1985 (aged 89); Davao City, Philippines
- Education: University of Washington; Fondation Des Ecoles D'Art Americaines De Fontainebleau
- Known for: Painting
- Notable work: "The Sketch", "The Builders", "Interaction", "Fontainebleau, August 1937", "The Model and The Artist"
- Movement: Modernism
- Awards: Order of National Artists of the Philippines

Victorio Candido Edades (December 23, 1895 – March 7, 1985) was a Filipino painter. He led the revolutionary Thirteen Moderns, who engaged their classical compatriots in heated debate over the nature and function of art. He was named a National Artist in 1976. The history names Victorio Edades as “the father of Modern Philippine art". Schooled in the US upon his return he introduced an entirely new way of thinking about art. He argued that art can be more than representation of reality, it can be representation of reality as seen through the mind and emotions of the artist.

== Biography ==
Victorio Edades was born on December 23, 1895, to Hilario and Cecilia Edades. He was the youngest of ten children (six of whom died of smallpox). He grew up in Barrio Bolosan in Dagupan, Pangasinan. His artistic ability surfaced during his early years. By seventh grade, his teachers were so impressed with him that he was dubbed "apprentice teacher" in his art class. He was also an achiever from the very beginning, having won awards in school debates and writing competitions.

== Later career ==
After high school, Edades and his friends traveled to the United States. Before enrolling in Seattle, Edades incidentally made a detour to Alaska and experienced working in a couple of factories. Nonetheless, he moved on to Seattle and enrolled at the University of Washington where he took up architecture and later earned a Master of Fine Arts in Painting. The significant event that stirred Edades, and made him as what he is known now, was his encounter with the traveling exhibition from the New York Armory Hall. This art show presented modern European artists such as Cézanne, Gauguin, Matisse, Picasso and the Surrealists. His growing appreciation to what he saw veered him away from the conservative academic art and Realistic schools and thus he began to paint in the modern manner. The two former schools of thought were inclined more towards idyllic subject matter, and require a mastery of refined detailing. What attracted Edades to the modernist movement was its principle to go beyond the idealistic exteriors propagated by Impressionism and Realism. Modernist thought encourages experimentation in artistic expression and allows the artist to present reality as he sees it in his own way.

During his journey to America, he participated in art competitions, one of which was the Annual Exhibition of North American Artists. His entry The Sketch (1927) won second prize. When he returned to the Philippines in 1928, he saw that the state of art was "practically dead." Paintings he saw dealt with similar themes and were done in a limited technique that mostly followed the works of Fernando Amorsolo, the first Philippine national artist and the most popular painter of the time. He recognized that there was no creativity whatsoever, and that the artists of that time were merely "copying" each other. So in December, Edades bravely mounted a one-man show at the Philippine Columbia Club in Ermita to introduce to the masses what his modern art was all about. He showed thirty paintings, including those that won acclaim in America. It was a distinguished exhibit, for the Filipino art circle was suddenly shaken by what this young man from Pangasinan had learned from his studies abroad. Viewers and critics were apparently shocked and not one painting was sold.

Edades helped organize the University of Santo Tomas (UST) Department of Architecture in 1930 and was its acting head. In 1935, he was appointed as Director of the UST College of Architecture and Fine Arts, which he organized under the wing of Architecture. He was guided by the existing American curricula when he made the Fi Painting. On February 12, 1977, UST conferred on Edades the degree of Doctor of Fine Arts, Honoris Causa.

== Retirement ==
Edades retired to Davao City with his family. There he taught for a time at the Philippine Women's College and resumed his career as an artist.

== Death ==
He died on March 7, 1985, in Davao City, Philippines.

== Artistic development ==
Early styles after his stint in architecture already show his inclination towards the impressionism technique. In The Market and The Picnic, his choice of subject matter do not take flight from pleasant daily scenery; yet his brush strokes and observance of non-proportionality in the figures made his teachers consider him "very ambitious." His earlier works already showed his affinity towards the style of Cézanne and other Post-Impressionists.

The height of his artistic development is his dynamic entry into Philippine art in 1928 with his solo exhibit at the Philippine Columbia Club. Here he mounted his most renowned work, The Builders. This work is the sum total of all the other pieces included in the show. They are a far cry from the works of the first Philippine national artist and most popular painter Fernando Amorsolo and the other classicists who painted bright cheery scenes of flawless Filipinos and their idealized daily routines. Edades, on the other hand, presented figures in muddy earth colors – yellow ochres and raw sienna accented by bold black contours. Subjects are distorted figures (those whose proportions defy classical measure), and Edades’ brush strokes are agitated and harsh. The choice of his subject also caused quite a stir to those who viewed the show. He portrayed tough, dirty construction laborers and simple folk wrestling in dung and dust. Even his nudes are nothing like Amorsolo's portrayal of the Filipina at her best.

With the uproar Edades' ideas raised, he knew that he cannot make a living out by merely painting what he wished. So he got by producing commissioned works, particularly murals. He did murals for prominent individuals (like Juan Nakpil) and institutions. His later works are said to be ‘flatter.’ His portraits and genre paintings in Davao are not seen to be as heavy or solid as his earlier phase with The Builders. From Cézanne, Edades grew more interested in the style of Utamaro of Japan and other artists whose charm is in color rather than solidity.

By introducing modern ideas into the Philippine art scene, Victorio Edades managed to destroy the conventions of domestic art, and also got rid of the clichéd ideology he believed stunted the development of Philippine art. His defiance to what the Conservatives structured as ‘art’ was a conscious call for real artistic expression. He attested that "art is ever the expression of man's emotion, and not a mere photographic likeness of nature. Thus to express his individual emotion, the artist is privileged to create in that distinctive form that best interprets his own experience. And the distortion of plastic elements of art such as line, mass and color – is one of the many ways of expressing one's rhythmic form." That was the reason why his disproportionate figures are made that way – for the sake of composition.

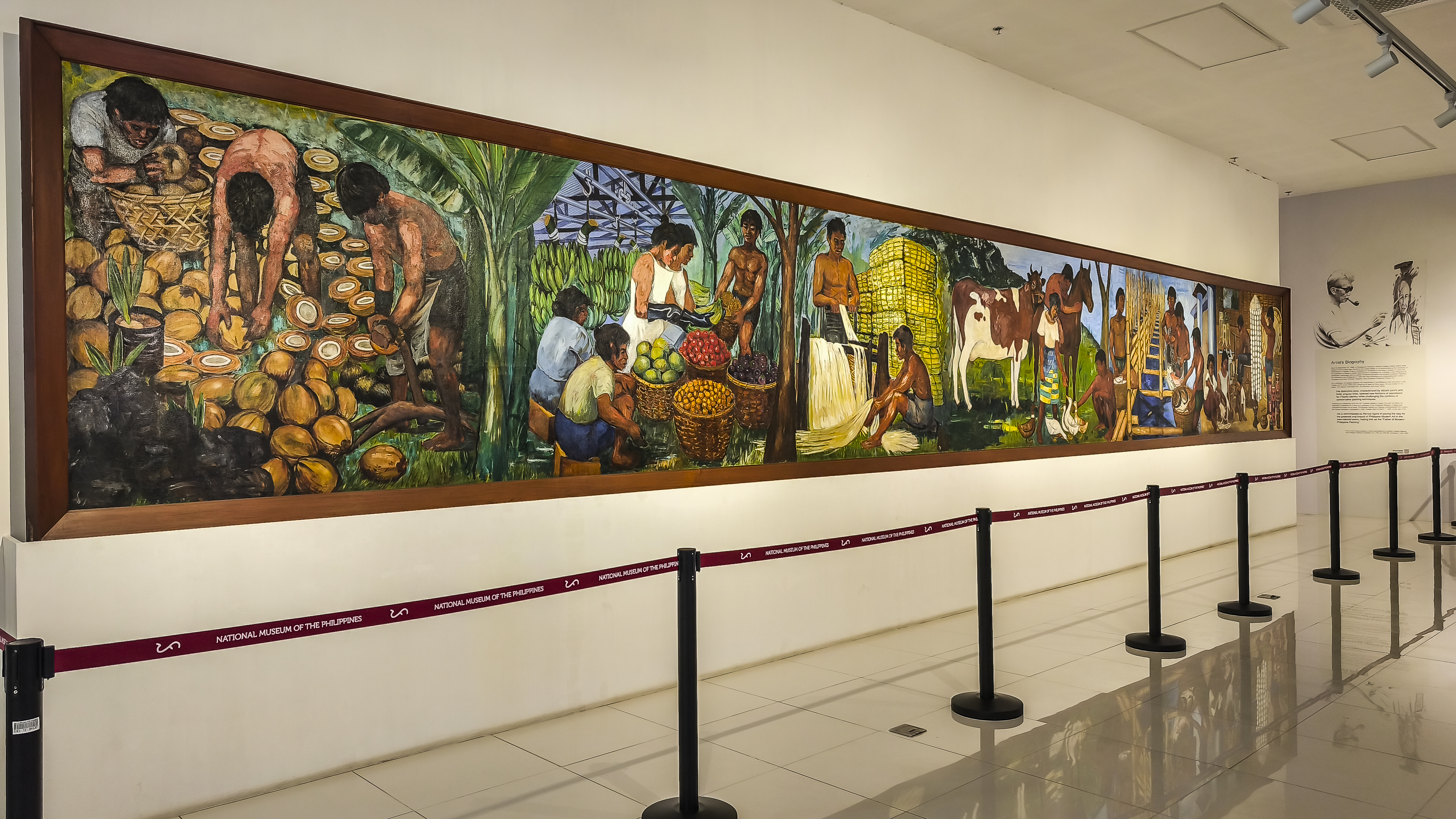
Davao Industries of Victorio Edades at the National Museum of the Philippines - Davao City, August 2026

== Legacy ==
Through his continuous propagation of modern art as shown in his works and teachings, Edades proved that modernists were not fooling people as Guillermo Tolentino asserted. Dialectically, Edades explained that modern art is not anti-classicist. He said, "From the technical point of view, Modern Art is an outgrowth of Classical Art. Modern Art is the interpretation of the Classical concept conditioned by the artist's new experience with the aid of improved means of aesthetic expression." Not conforming to the academic perception of art, he made art available to the ordinary person. Through his determination to stand by his ideology, Edades became a bridge between the past and the present.

=== Auction records ===
For the longest period, the works of Edades despite his role in the development of Philippine modernism have only become prominent in the Philippine art market during the 2010s. In the same period, works by other Philippine modernists Anita Magsaysay-Ho, José T. Joya and Hernando R. Ocampo have already broken world record prices at auction.

On November 22, 2014, an early work from 1926 called American Football Player sold for a record price of PHP9.276 million (US$205,923.65) at a Christie's auction in Hong Kong. That record was broken on June 11, 2022, when a later work from 1976 called Poinsettia Girl was sold at a León Gallery auction in Manila for a world record price of PHP23.230 million (US$440,257.98).

== The Other Moderns ==
Galo B. Ocampo; Carlos V. Francisco (National Artist, 1973); Vicente Manansala (National Artist, 1981); Hernando R. Ocampo (National Artist, 1991); Cesar Legaspi (National Artist, 1990); Demetrio Diego; Diosdado Lorenzo; José Pardo; Ricarte Purugganan; Bonifacio Cristobal; Arsenio Capili; Anita Magsaysay-Ho.
