= Carmen Zaragoza y Rojas =

Filipina artist

Carmen Zaragoza y Roxas
- Born: Maria Carmen Vicenta Petra Zaragoza y Rojas; June 29, 1867; Quiapo, Manila, Captaincy General of the Philippines, Spanish Empire
- Died: June 29, 1943 (aged 76); Manila, Commonwealth of the Philippines
- Occupation: artist
- Known for: Dos Inteligencias; La Ilustracion Filipina del Oriente
- Spouse: Gregorio S. Araneta (m. 1896; died 1930)
- Parent(s): Jose Zaragoza (father); Rosa Roxas (mother)

Maria Carmen Vicenta Petra Zaragoza de Araneta y Rojas, also known as Carmen Zaragoza y Roxas (June 29, 1867 – June 29, 1943), was an early Filipina artist.

== Biography ==
Zaragoza was born on June 29, 1876, in Quiapo, Manila. She came from an artistic family: her uncle Felix was an architect and her uncle Felipe a landscape painter. In 1892, she created the masterpiece known as Dos Inteligencias (Two Intellectuals), a painting that won her a prize during the 1892 anniversary of Christopher Columbus and his discovery of America. Two years later, during the 1895 Exposición Regional de Filipinas (1895 Regional Exposition in the Philippines), Zaragoza was awarded a copper medal for creating two landscapes.

Zaragoza helped to establish the late 19th-century magazine La Ilustracion Filipina del Oriente, founded by her father Jose Zaragoza y Aranquizna.

Zaragoza was married to politician and businessman Gregorio S. Araneta in 1896. They had 14 children whom they raised in her family's ancestral house on Hidalgo Street (formerly Calle San Sebastian) in Quiapo, Manila.

As she aged, Zaragoza gradually lost her sight. She died on June 29, 1943, on her 76th birthday.

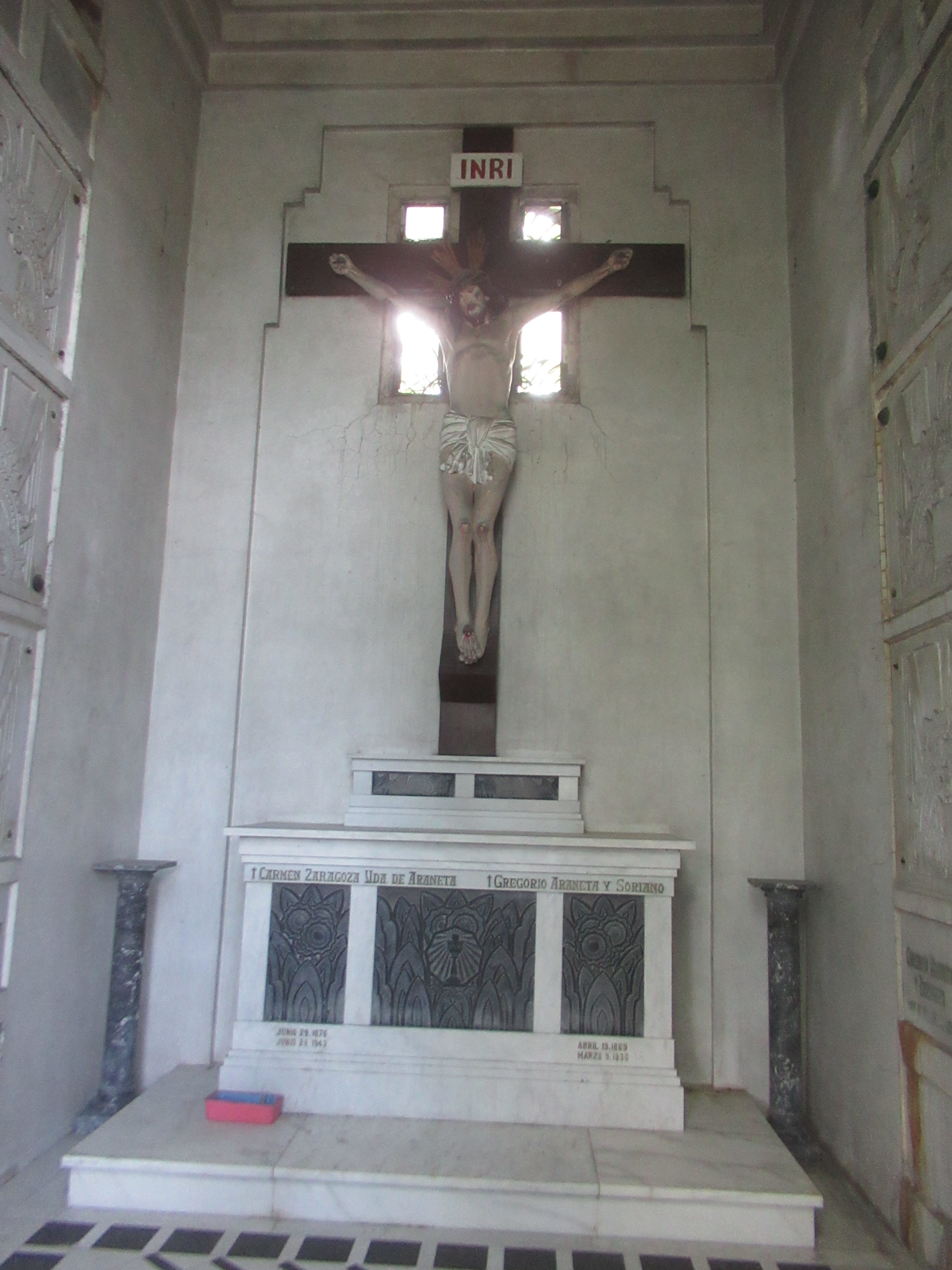
Gregorio Soriano Araneta & Carmen Zaragoza y Rojas' graves at La Loma Cemetery.

== See also ==
- List of Filipino women artists
