= Yun Suknam =

Korean artist

- Born: 1939 (age 86–87); Manchuria, China
- Education: Sungkyunkwan University, Pratt Institute
- Website: www.yunsuknam.com

Yun Suknam (Korean: 윤석남; born 1939) is a South Korean artist. Yun has been called "a pioneering figure in feminist art".

== Early life and education ==
Yun Suknam was born in 1939 in Manchuria, China. She returned to Korea, a year after Korea's liberation from Japan in 1946. She studied English literature at Sungkyunkwan University in South Korea, It was not until her 40s that she entered the art world, moving to New York to study printmaking at Pratt Institute, and painting at the Art Student League in New York.

== Work ==
Yun has been an active feminist artist based in Seoul. Following her studies in New York City, she returned to Korea to found the feminist art collective October Group (Sewolmoyim) in 1985. The following year, the group would hold what is widely considered to be Kora's first feminist exhibition. Yun Suk-nam has dedicated her career to creating art advocating women's rights.

Her work is included in the collections of the Tate Museum, the Queensland Art Gallery and the Fukuoka Asian Art Museum.
