= Karina Baluyut =

Filipino artist

- Education: University of the Philippines
- Movement: Guevarra Group of Artists

Karina Baluyut is an artist from the Philippines. Her paintings are expressionist in nature. Her abstract work is defined by color fields, organic patterns and "bold brushwork."

Baluyut is among the original members of the Guevarra Group of Artists from its inception, and one of the first to have exhibited their works at Galerie Joaquin.

== Life ==
She graduated from the University of the Philippines.

Given her formal training as an architect, Baluyut has incorporated the tenets of the discipline in her work as a painter in the abstract expressionist genre. Baluyut's works are highly distinctive for their sparing but eloquent evocations of key architectural concepts and principles. These abstractions often conjure themes of reflection and contemplation. Her influences are Mark Rothko, Paul Klee and other progenitors of the Color Field painting.

Baluyut is a veteran of countless group shows, mostly at the Galerie Joaquin.

Her one-woman show was titled “Fields of Gold”. She was one of the artists selected to be shown in Galerie Raphael's first exhibit.
