= Marge Organo =

Filipina glass artist

- Born: Ilocos Sur

Marge Organo is a Filipina glass artist.

She was born and raised in Ilocos Sur.

== Life ==
Organo's interest in art started at a young age, however, she never fully dedicated herself to it. After graduating from college, she managed her family's pharmaceutical business. She went to a semi-retirement home in 2014 and decided to take art classes from painter Fernando Sena. Organo explored various forms of art — such as abstract painting, tile mosaic, furniture upholstery, interior and exterior design and construction — until she came to the conclusion that she wants to pursue a field where women are sparse: sculpture.

== Education and career ==
Organo took up formal lessons in sculpture and studied clay, welding, cold casting and bronze casting. She began exhibiting and eventually decided to hand over the management of her business to her son.

Organo studied at the Corning Museum of Glass (CMOG) in 2015. The following year, she was granted a scholarship.

Organo attended the Secondary School of Glassmaking in Kamenicky Senov, the oldest glass school in the world, in 2018. There, she learned a novel technique in glass casting and mold making.

Employing all that she learned, Organo held several solo exhibitions as she returned to the Philippines. In 2019, she decided to return to CMOG to further her skills. She studied lifecasting.

== Selected works ==
- Makayla
- Magnum Opus
- Fairy Godmother
- Golden Forest
- Song of the clouds
- Lilith
- Jill
- Interlude
- Metamorphosis
- Kisses
- I Got You
