= Paulina Constancia =

Filipino-Canadian artist

- Born: Maria Paulina Constancia Cornejo Lee; 1 December 1970 (age 55); Cebu City, Philippines
- Notable work: A Heart's Choice, Kleur en ik in de geheime tuin
- Spouse: Michael
- Children: Lucas
- Website: www.paulinaconstancia.com

Paulina Constancia (born Maria Paulina Constancia Cornejo Lee) is a Filipino-Canadian artist. She is known for her work on canvas, textiles, and found materials, sometimes incorporating stitching. She is associated with the Paulina Constancia Museum of Naïve art (MoNA).

Constancia's art has been exhibited worldwide, including in the Philippines, Indonesia, Thailand, Malaysia, the Netherlands, Mexico, Greece, Slovenia, and Poland. She has displayed her art in various cities in the U.S. and Canada.

== Career ==
Her career began in the early 1990s. In 1997, her art was featured on the back cover of the December edition of Reader's Digest. In 2000 a collection of her painted quilts titled "Kleur en ik in de geheime tuin" ("Color and me in the sealso cret garden") was showcased at the Centrum voor Kunst en Cultuur in Hoofddorp and Kunst 2001 Gallery in Badhoevedorp, presented by the VHC-Vereniging Haarlemmermeer-Cebu (sister cities organization of Haarlemmermeer and Cebu). In 1997, Constancia was featured in a show called "Here's to Sunny" at the Philippine Center in New York City, presented by the Philippine Centennial Coordinating Council of Northeast U.S.

From 2012 to 2015, Constancia maintained an art blog called Daily Dose of Art (DDoA).

In 2013 and 2014 Constancia's collection "Moments of Motherhood" (MOM) was exhibited in Japan, Malaysia, and Indonesia.

In 2016, she was one of eight naive artists invited to participate in the 49th International Meeting of Naïve Artists at the Trebnje Gallery of Naïve Artists in Slovenia. In 2020, Paulina's art "Covid Times at the Park" was the feature/cover piece for the XIII Art Naif Festiwal (naif art festival) in Katowice, Poland.

Constancia is based in Canada and creates art in her home studio. She blogs and teaches arts and crafts.

== Style ==
Constancia has described her art as naive art. She is best known for bright-colored and whimsical narratives painted on quilts and tiles that are also shown and reflected in her writing. Sunstar Daily's Leticia Suarez said of her work, "Her paintings are like a breath of green air in the local art scene. It's like going from the dusty street into a woody hide-away that's full of magical secrets."

== Writing ==
- Brazos Abiertos/Open Arms, a bilingual poetry collection (2003)
- Cuentos Hispano-filipinos/Hispano-Philippine Stories, short stories (2009).
