= Hernando R. Ocampo =

Filipino artist

Hernando Ruiz Ocampo
- Born: Hernando Ruiz Ocampo; April 28, 1911; Manila, Philippine Islands
- Died: December 28, 1978 (aged 67); Caloocan, Metro Manila, Philippines
- Resting place: Loyola Memorial Park Marikina
- Known for: Fiction, playwright, editing
- Awards: Order of National Artists of the Philippines

Hernando Ruiz Ocampo (April 28, 1911 – December 28, 1978) was a Filipino National Artist in the visual arts. He was also a fictionist, playwright and editor.

== Background ==
Hernando Ruiz Ocampo was a leading radical modernist artist in the Philippines. He was a member of the Saturday Group of artists (also known as the Taza de Oro Group), and was one of the pre-war Thirteen Moderns, a group of modernist artists founded by Victorio C. Edades in 1938. Famously known for his triumvirate with neo-realists Vicente S. Manansala and Cesar Legaspi, his works reflected the harsh realities of his country after the Second World War. However, many of his works depicted lush sceneries and the beautiful Philippine landscapes through his skillful use of fierce and bold colors.

H. R. Ocampo was credited for inventing a new mode of abstraction that exemplifies Philippine flora and fauna, and portrays sunshine, stars and rain. Using movement and bold colors, Ocampo utilized fantasy and science fiction as the basis for his works. His art is described to be "abstract compositions of biological forms that seemed to oscillate, quiver, inflame and multiply" like mutations.

== Early career ==
Ocampo was born in Santa Cruz, Manila, but later transferred to #61 Dimasalang St., Caloocan. His parents were Emilio Ocampo y Saltiero and Delfina Ruiz y Santo. He originally studied law, commerce and creative writing, and worked as a writer before he taught himself the visual arts. During his career as a writer, he was one of the organizers of Veronicans, a young group of progressive and prolific writers. He worked in various periodicals such as Taliba newspaper and Manila Sunday Chronicle magazine. He also worked as a scriptwriter and director for television, and produced and directed for the Filipino Players Guild.

== Later career ==
His works as a writer includes "Don’t Cry, Don’t Fret" in poetry; "Ikalawang Pagdalaw," "Unang Pamumulaklak," "Rice and Bullets," and "Bakia" in fiction; and "Buntot Page," a screenplay written with Mario David.

His major works in the visual arts include Ina ng Balon, Calvary, Slum Dwellers, Nude with Candle and Flower, Man and Carabao, Angel's Kiss, Palayok at Kalan, Ancestors, Isda at Mangga, The Resurrection, Fifty-three "Q," Back drop, Fiesta, Mother and Child, Easter Sunday, and his most acknowledged work Genesis, which served as the basis of curtain design in the Cultural Center of the Philippines Main Theater. His works were exhibited in Washington, New York, London, and Tokyo, among others. His work was also part of the painting event in the art competition at the 1948 Summer Olympics. Awards received include: Republic Cultural Award in 1965; Patnubay ng Sd in 1969; Diwa ng Lahi Award in 1976; and Gawad CCP para sa Sining Award in 1979.

Famous for his work "We or They"

== Death ==
Ocampo died at the age of 67 in Caloocan, Philippines.

== See also ==
- Art of the Philippines
