= Anita Magsaysay-Ho =

Filipina painter

- Born: May 25, 1914; Zambales, Philippines
- Died: May 5, 2012 (aged 97); Manila, Philippines
- Education: School of Fine Arts at the University of the Philippines
- Occupation: Painter
- Spouse: Robert Ho (m. 1948)
- Children: 5
- Awards: See "Awards" section

Anita Magsaysay Ho (born Anita Corpus Magsaysay; May 25, 1914 – May 5, 2012) was a Filipina painter who specialized in Social Realism and post-Cubism in regard to women in Filipino culture. Magsaysay-Ho's work appeals to Modernism by utilizing more abstract designs and styles rather than realistic approaches. She was the only female member of the "Thirteen Moderns," a standing group of Filipino modernist artists, and in 1958 was chosen by a panel of experts as one of the six major painters of the country's history. The most famous work of Magsaysay-Ho are subject to the beauty of Filipino women dealing with everyday issues. Collections of her artwork can be found in museums around the Philippines.

== Biography ==
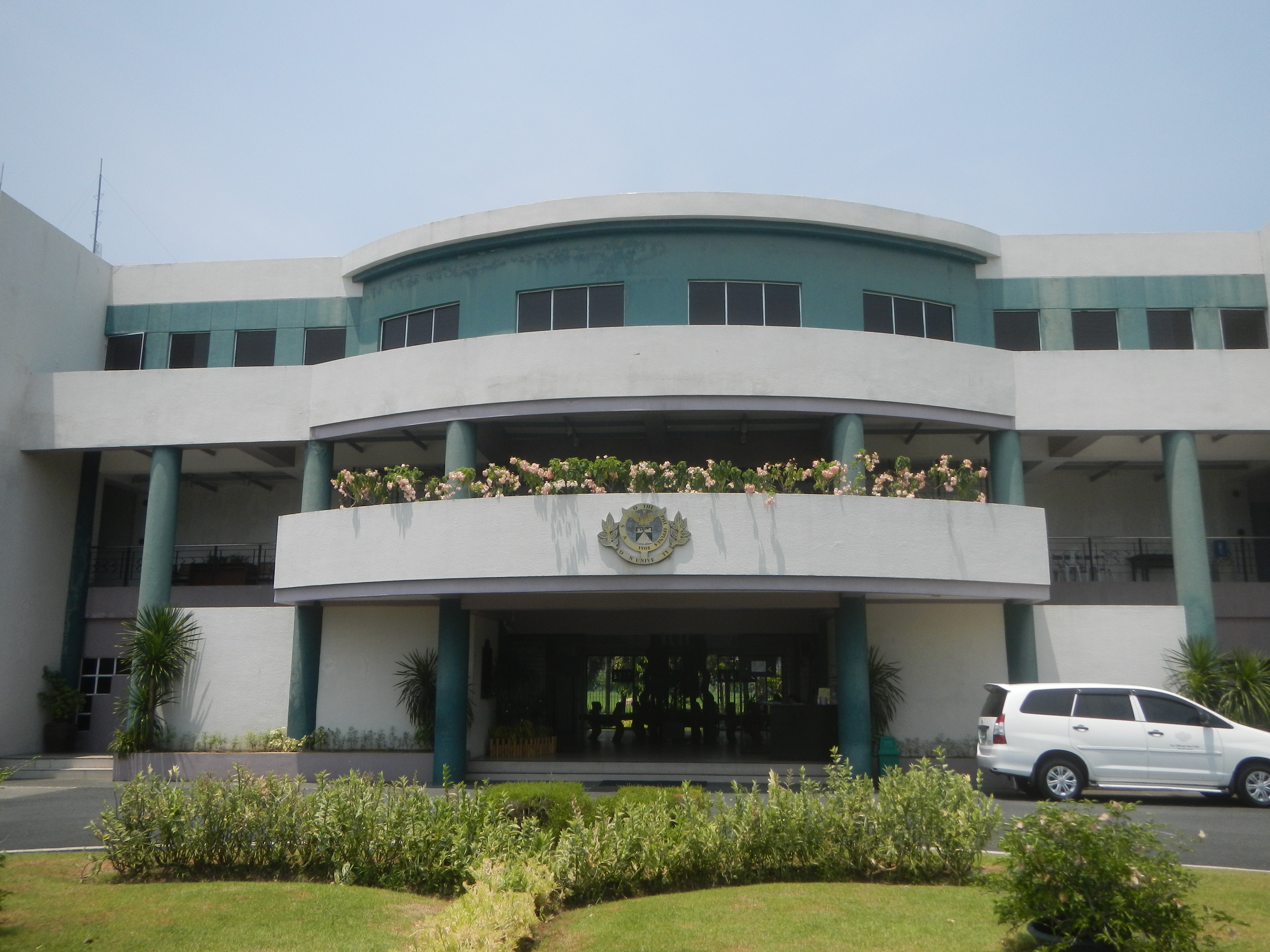
University of the Philippines, where Magsaysay-Ho studied at its School of Fine Arts

Anita Magsaysay was born in 1914 in Manila. Her parents were Armilla Corpus and Ambrosio Magsaysay, an engineer. A cousin of Anita was Philippine President Ramon Magsaysay, whose father Exequiel was a brother of Ambrosio. At thirteen years of age, she studied at the School of Fine Arts of the University of the Philippines (UP), where she took instruction from prominent Filipino painters like Fabian de la Rosa, Fernando Amorsolo, and his brother Pablo Amorsolo. She then followed UP's School of Design, with teachers as Victorio Edades and Enrique Ruiz. After her studies at UP, she left in the 1930s to go to the United States, where she studied at the Cranbrook Academy in Michigan and took class courses on oil painting. At the Art Student's League in New York City, Magsaysay-Ho took classes on drawing.

There she met Robert Ho from Hong Kong who was also a student in New York City. They married in 1947 and moved to China, where Ho's shipping industry company, Magsaysay Inc., began. The couple had five children, and the family moved frequently because of Ho's work. They lived in Brazil, Canada, Hong Kong, New York, Washington, D.C., and Japan to name a few. Over the span of 50 years, this family moved to thirty different houses after living in Manila together for fourteen years. Wherever she lived, Anita had access to a studio, where she spent most of her time painting.

In 1958, the Manila Chronicle formed a panel of experts who decided that Magsaysay-Ho is one of the most significant painters to go down in the history of the Philippines. She was soon named one of the "Thirteen Moderns," a group of Filipino modernist artists, and the only woman of the group. In 2005, Alfredo Roces wrote a biography of her titled "Anita Magsaysay-Ho: In Praise of Women."

== Works of Art ==
Magsaysay-Ho found inspiration from her childhood and important women in her life. Although she traveled all her life and encountered many different women from different cultures, all of the women in her paintings are of Filipinas because they are what she is most familiar with. Most of her paintings deal with Filipina women performing tasks such as cooking, harvesting, and tending to farms and children. The women she paints are seen without anger and are not concerned with gender roles or politics, as the women in her childhood were not. Magsaysay-Ho has revealed that she takes a liking to painting women who are at work in the fields as it shows their true strength. Despite frequently travelling, Magsaysay-Ho consistently painted the Philippines based on her memory. Magsaysay-Ho's favorite medium to paint with was egg tempera as used in her earlier work, but the physical demands forced her to utilize other techniques. So, she would paint by means of oils, acrylics, drawings, and lithographs. Her egg tempera paintings, however, are now some of her most sought-after works of art. In the early 1940s, the influence of her teacher Fernando Amorsolo was clearly visible, both in terms of subject and brightness of the paintings. Some call Magsaysay-Ho the "Female Amorsolo" because, like Fernando, she prefers having women as her subjects of painting. Her work appealed to Social Realism and post-Cubism by painting distortions and semi-abstract faces and portraits. It evolved toward Modernism, which, among other things, is expressed in its Cubist style.

Magsaysay-Ho's work can be distinguished between the decades. In the 1950s, her work was exhibited in The Philippine Art Association (PAG) and grouped among other notable Neo-Realist artists. This period is when her most notorious work that involved light and dark contrasts of Filipina women hard at work were created. The 1960s brought along more articulate, spaced-out figures and softened tones. A decade later, her work was inspired by Chinese calligraphy as she created objects found in nature by using ink blots. Finally, in the 1980s Magsaysay-Ho utilized green hues to portray fruits and vegetables that oftentimes resembled women.

Her most famous work includes "Two Women," a painting portraying two Filipina women with white head-wraps shucking corn together while smiling, "Cooks," featuring three Filipina women with pots full of food in front of them, and "Mending the Nets" that shows two Filipina women conversing while stitching a net. All of these won first place at The Philippine Art Association.

On October 3, 1999, her painting "In the Marketplace" sold for SGD 669,250 (US $405,360) in Singapore. This was a record high price for any Filipino artist during their lifetime.

== Death ==
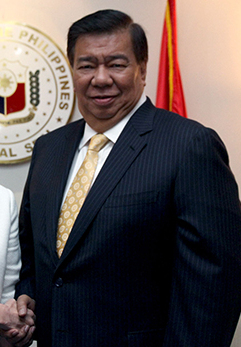
Senator Franklin Drilon, who wanted Magsaysay-Ho's work to be recognized

She painted through to old age, until her 2009 stroke. She died three years later on May 5, 2012, in Manila, Philippines, at age 97. A senate resolution was filed by Senator Franklin Drilon recommending Magsaysay-Ho to be conferred the National Artist Award for her contributions to Filipino modern art. The resolution ultimately did not pass as Magsaysay-Ho died a Canadian citizen.

== Awards ==
- 2nd prize at the Manila Grand Opera House Exhibition (1950) for "Five Senses"
- 1st prize of The Philippine Art Association (PAG) (1952) for "Cooks"
- 2nd prize of The Philippine Art Association (PAG) (1953) for "Fruit Vendors"
- 1st prize of The Philippine Art Association (PAG) (1959) for "Mending the Nets"
- 1st prize of The Philippine Art Association (PAG) (1960) for "Two Women"
- 2nd prize of The Philippine Art Association (PAG) (1962) for "Trio"

== Collections ==
There are collections of Anita Magsaysay-Ho in:

- The Ateneo Art Gallery, Manila, Philippines.
- The Lopez Memorial Museum and Library, Pasig, Philippines.
- The Metropolitan Museum of Manila, Manila Philippines.
- The Yuchengco Museum, Makati City, Philippines.
- Iloilo Museum of Contemporary Art, Iloilo, Philippines
