= Pelagia Mendoza y Gotianquin =

- Born: June 9, 1867; Pateros, Manila Province, Captaincy General of the Philippines
- Died: March 13, 1939 (aged 71); Manila, Commonwealth of the Philippines
- Resting place: Manila North Cemetery
- Occupation: Sculptor
- Years active: 1889–1939
- Known for: Being the first known Filipina woman sculptor and the first female student admitted to the Academia de Dibujo y Pintura
- Notable work: Colon (1892), a wax bust of Christopher Columbus

Pelagia Mendoza y Gotianquin (June 9, 1867 – March 13, 1939) was the first female sculptor in the Philippines and was the first female student at the Escuela de Dibujo y Pintura (Drawing and Painting School).

== Biography ==
Mendoza was born on June 9, 1867, in Pateros, Rizal, to Venancio Mendoza and Evarista Gotianquin. She was the second child in a family of five. From an early age, she showed an interest in art by sketching landscapes, embroidering handkerchiefs, and modelling small figures of people, animals, birds, and flowers.

In 1889, at the age of 22, Mendoza became the first female student admitted to the Escuela de Dibujo y Pintura in Manila. The school's director, Lorenzo Rocha, accepted her and personally supervised her studies. Her admission made the academy the only coeducational art institution in the Philippines during the Spanish colonial period. She completed her painting course in 1892 and her sculpture course in 1898.

In 1892, before completing her sculpture course, Mendoza won first prize in the Columbus Quadricentennial Art Contest for her wax bust of Christopher Columbus, titled Colon. The award was presented by Governor-General Eulogio Despujol. Her achievement was featured on the cover of La Ilustracion Filipina on October 21, 1892. The following year, the same sculpture received second prize at the World's Columbian Exposition in Chicago, United States.

Aside from sculpture, Mendoza was also skilled in painting, particularly landscape painting. She received distinctions in school art competitions and was also interested in embroidery, creating designs for handkerchiefs and furniture covers. In 1892, she also received a Diploma of Honor for her work in an art competition held in connection with the tercentenary of Saint John of the Cross.

In 1892, Mendoza married Crispulo Zamora, a silversmith and fellow artist. They had seven children. After her husband's death in 1922, she took over their business. She travelled to China, Japan, Indonesia, Malaysia, and Indochina to study different carving techniques and designs while continuing to manage the business.

Mendoza died in Manila in March 1939 and was buried at the Manila North Cemetery. She is remembered as a pioneer of Philippine sculpture and as one of the women who helped expand opportunities for Filipinas in formal art education and the visual arts during the Spanish colonial period.

== Biography ==
Born in the Pateros district of Manila on 9 June 1867, she was the daughter of Venancio Mendoza and Evarista Gotianquin. From an early age, she became interested in art, sketching landscapes, embroidering handkerchiefs and modelling figures of people and animals. Pelagia Mendoza y Gotianquin (1867–1939) was the first female sculptor in the Philippines and was the first female student at the Escuela de Dibujo y Pintura (Drawing and Painting School). Pelagia, when 22, was the first woman admitted to the art school Escuela de Dibujo y Pintura. Lorenzo Rocha, the school's head took a personal interest in her studies. She received her diploma in painting in 1892 and in sculpture in 1898. In 1892, before she had completed her sculpture course, she won first prize in the Columbus Quadricentennial Art Contest for a wax bust of Christopher Columbus. It was awarded by Governor General Eulogio Despujol y Dusay. For her bust, Pelagia also won second prize at the 1893 World's Columbian Exposition.

She developed her painting skills, especially in landscapes, winning a number of prizes. In addition to painting and sculpture, she also took an interest in embroidery, decorating handkerchiefs and furniture covers.

In 1892, Pelagia married the silversmith Crispulo Zamora (1871–1922), a fellow student, with whom she had seven children.
