= Paz Paterno =

Filipina artist

- Born: 1867
- Died: 1914 (aged 46–47)
- Style: Landscape painting

Paz Paterno (1867–1914) was a Filipina artist. She was the first Filipino woman to paint natural sceneries.

Paterno was raised in an artistic family. The composer Dolores Paterno was her half-sister.

== Education ==
Peterno studied at the Academia de Dibujo y Pintura, where she was taught by artists Lorenzo Gurrero and Teodoro Buenaventura.

== Art ==
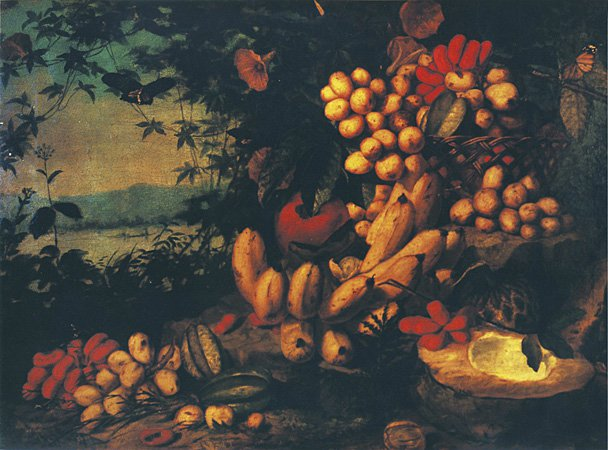
Still Life, 1884

Paterno made oil paintings on canvas. In 1884, she created Still Life. It is a romantic artwork that shows a rich cluster of fruits that are found in the Philippine islands. Fruit and Basket (1885), which realistically depicts butterflies and flies hovering over fruits, is displayed at the Central Bank of the Philippines. Paterno is estimated to be active from 1884 to 1894.

Paterno's works are delicate and she executed proficiency in handling light and detail. She was also said to be skilled in miniature painting which was very popular at the time.

Paterno is considered a significant figure in the history of women's inclusion in the local art scene. She was the first woman to paint natural sceneries.

== Death ==
Paterno died in 1914 due to ill health. She was 47 years old.
