= Imelda Cajipe-Endaya =

Filipina artist

- Born: Imelda Cajipe; 16 September 1949 (age 77); Manila, Philippines
- Education: University of the Philippines
- Occupations: Visual artist, curator, author, activist, community leader
- Known for: printmaking, painting, mixed-media art, installation art
- Spouse: Simplicio Endaya
- Relatives: Francisco E. Baisas (maternal grandfather)
- Awards: Order of National Artists of the Philippines (2026)

Imelda Cajipe-Endaya (born 16 September 1949) is a Filipino visual artist, curator, author, activist, and community leader. She is known for her printmaking, painting, mixed-media art, and installation art. She is also an author of various texts and books, as well as the co-founder of Kasibulan, an artist collective in the Philippines. She also initiated the Pananaw (Philippine Journal of Visual Arts), of which she was the first editor. Cajipe-Endaya has become a main figure Filipino feminist and national liberation movements and Philippine art. Her advocacy of women centers around Philippine history and culture. She is the first Filipina to be conferred as a National Artist of the Philippines for Visual Arts.

== Early life and education ==
Cajipe-Endaya was born in Manila, Philippines. Her father, Dr. Pedro M. Cajipe, was a survivor of the Bataan Death March, while her mother, Felipa Baisas (a daughter of the noted scientist Francisco E. Baisas), was a pharmacist and chemistry teacher. Both of them came from Paete, Laguna. Cajipe-Endaya's work emerged from the period of ferment during the 1960s and 1970s in the Philippines. It was a period characterized by socio-political upheaval and awakening in response to the declaration of martial law in the Philippines and as a result of the Vietnam War and a succession of economic crises. She attended the University of the Philippines College of Fine Arts in Quezon City, Philippines where she earned a BA degree in advertising art in 1970, and studied art history and criticism in 1976 to 1977.

== Career ==
In 1976, she produced a series of prints related to contemporary identity in the Philippines, which she named "Ninuno". After graduating college, she was involved mainly in the production of calligraphy and etching, influenced by artists such as Benedicto Cabrera and Ofelia Gelvezon-Tequi. In 1979, she was awarded the gold medal in printmaking from the Art Association of the Philippines in 1979. She began oil painting in 1981. Two years later, her painting, which she called "Pasyong Bayan" ("A Nation's Passion"), expressed what she calls the "people’s rage against the human-rights violations perpetrated by a dictatorial regime that resulted in the loss of our democratic freedoms".

Cajipe-Endaya had a part-time job as an archival researcher and writer while starting a family. Her print exhibition in 1979 earned her critical acclaim. In 1980, she was rated one of the best ten printmakers by a panel of critics. In 1987 she co-founded "Kasibulan", a women artists' collective, and served as its first president.

She exhibited in the Philippines and abroad, curating major exhibitions of her own, and leading innovative initiatives as an organizer, cultural worker and writer.

In the 1990s, she began working in acrylic, and received a number of awards including the special award from the Cheju Korea pre-Biennale in 1995, the Araw ng Maynila Award for Painting in 1998 and RP Centennial Honors for the Arts in 1999. From 2005 to 2009 she lived in the United States with her husband, Simplicio, an economist and project consultant. She was a recipient of the Orange County Arts Federation of New York award in 2005 and 2006, and the American Society of Contemporary Artists (Asca) award in New York City in 2009. In 2017, she produced a large mural entitled "Upheaval", which she describes as "necessary in liberating the people from current social ills" and as a sort of self-transformation.

Cajipe-Endaya has also published a number of books.

In 2026, Cajipe-Endaya was recognized as a National Artist of the Philippines for Visual Arts following the issuance of Proclamation No. 1414 by president Bongbong Marcos.

== Key themes in art practices ==
=== Identity ===
Since the beginning of her career, she has been mixing indigenous Filipino materials and forms with new forms in order to integrate her social commitment with her art practice. A large part of her work includes her use of recycled and found objects. As an archival researcher and writer, she discovered historical and religious materials such as the Doctrina Christiana, the Doctrina China, and the Boxer Codex which date back to the 16th through 19th century during which the Philippines was a colony of Spain.

These antiquities inspired her to visually deconstruct Philippine history in terms of a search for a Filipino cultural identity. Her use of images of Philippine ancestors from these colonial sources was an artistic exploration into the country's indigenous roots. She addresses the issue of American imperialism through her works that incorporate images and narratives suggestive of the influence of Hollywood, American television, pop music, and fashion - a veritable cultural bombardment.

These works depict the inevitable tensions between colonial and indigenous cultures, as exemplified in an early work (1979) “Saan Ka Nanggaling, Saan Ka Darating?” ("Where have you been, where are you going?") Through images of effaced and shrouded aqua-tinted silhouettes against a background of scattered Spanish scripts, this work follows the complex cultural changes experienced by an indigenous woman and underscores the need for Philippine society to establish its cultural identity.

=== Experience of diasporic Filipino community and displacement ===
Cajipe-Endaya's works also explore the heterogeneous experience of the Filipino diaspora. Intertwined with the theme of Filipino Identity, she also explores the experience of Filipina migrant labour. In 1981, she produced a series of social realism paintings that depicted wives and mothers witnessing the neo-liberal phenomenon of export labour, displacement of native cultures due to technology and agriculture. Her involvement in protest movements then deepened as her works began to explore themes of human rights, poverty and national problems. This can be seen in her 1983 painting "Pasyong Bayan" ("A Nation's Passion"), which speaks of the people's struggle against militarisation in the Philippines and injustices of martial law under the dictatorship of President Marcos, facilitated by American imperialism.

In her use of periodicals, stickers, art reproductions and texts allowed her illuminate national social, political, environmental and economic issues and struggles within the Philippines. She did further research into Filipino printmaking since the 17th century and regional folk art. Her works explore the experience of on-going colonisation, Armageddon from continuous Filipino occupation and inappropriate modernisation, as well as dealing with traumas of these struggles.

The artist's works grew even stronger in analysing the issues and struggles faced by Filipina women including the phenomena of mail order brides, justice for WWII comfort women, women as labour exports and children's rights. She explores the ways in which Filipina women bring their culture everywhere they go, in symbols and signs, hopefully overcoming their separation and loneliness. Within this part of her work, she uses religious iconography and elements including scapulars, holy icons, anting-antings or amulet figures and sometimes books. This can be seen in her work Foreign Domestic Work (1995), where the floor is sprawled with texts of specific issues faced by domestic workers and the solutions to which are spelled out on a woman's ironing board. Her use of everyday objects from home can be seen in here mixed media assemblages where she uses nipa and sawali from the bahay kubo, as well as clothing, walis (broom), her grandmother's shawl, her husband's denim jacket, her grandmother's shawl and her own beaded shoes. In doing so, she also conveys her personal anecdote, point of view or experience. Her experience as migrant Filipina woman can also be seen in her work, as she herself moved to New York from Manila in the early 2000s. Cajipe-Endaya's installations are both immensely personal but also conveys perspectives that are fundamentally collective.

=== Hope and empowerment ===
As well as community and struggle, Imelda Cajipe-Endaya's work also explores the themes of empowerment and hope. Throughout her works, she looks for heroines and heroes as she finds inspiration in martyred activists in against the Marcos regime, revolutionaries from the late nineteenth-century Philippine struggle of independence and unknown women artists. In this way, she hopes to connect herself and the viewers with the women she admires, and creates a network of alignment with bodies of heroines that are separated through geography and history. In her work Tanong ni Totoy (1981), the theme of freedom from the anxieties in women's confinement after their longing for that freedom is convey.

Her works also convey women's involvement in achieving reforms in worker's rights, farming resources and land ownership after the overthrowing of Marcos dictatorship. By the 1990s, her works focuses more on the power of women and their strength. This can be seen in her work There's a Filipina in Albania: A Stronger Woman Emerges (1999). Cajipe-Endaya speaks to the importance in maintaining indigenous wisdom through times of inappropriate modernisation and colonial dominance.

== Feminism and politics ==
Cajipe-Endaya's activism started in the 1960s in the University of the Philippines as a fine art student. She moved into the student politics by her growing dissatisfaction with the Marcos regime.

=== Emergence of feminist consciousness in the Philippines ===
The 1970s and 1980s in the Philippines is recognised to be an important historical juncture, as it saw the emergence of a women's group that redefined the grounds of women's struggle for empowerment. The first Museum curator of the Cultural Centre of the Philippines, Roberto C. Rodriguez, questioned art's notion as an establishment during the Marcos regime which vocalised its claim to progress, national identity and legitimacy.

Other groups emerged in concern for a wide range of concern from political participation, health to culture. The groups that emerged worked to critique and continue to critique social ills, joining the wider struggle for political and social change. This included the underground revolutionary group, Makibaka (Malayang Kilusan ng Bagong Kababaihan or Free Movement of New Women) that began shortly before the President Ferdinand Marcos declared martial law in 1972. Alongside this group forming was GABRIELA, Council of Primary Health, Concerned Artists of the Philippines Women's Desk, and the women's desk of the government's Cultural Centre of the Philippines. The Concerned Artists of the Philippines Women's Desk contributed in showcasing the talents of women who at the time were at the forefront of growth initiatives, including Cajipe-Endaya. From these coalitions, discussion of feminist practice and theory grew, for which Kasibulan continues to nurture artists who articulate a feminist consciousness through their arts.

=== Kasibulan ===
The ferment period also witnessed the establishment of all-women organisations including Kasibulan for which Cajipe-Endaya initiated as the founding president. It was legally registered in 1989, and was based on a sharing, sisterhood and solidarity driven practice. The collective launched empowering strategies of women, which came out of discussions with women across different professions.

With the new democratic space opening up after the dismantling of the Marcos dictatorship following the Aquino assassination, the group allowed women to occupy these spaces. The main project of Kasibulan included the creation of the representation and visibility of women artists, as well as a sisterly bond between them. They also questioned the canons of art, and challenged mainstream stereotypes and parameters surrounding artists and their roles. It expanded its membership and moved past the boundaries as women and artists within the academe, and advocated for women's rights, past the realm of art. The group's exhibits foregrounded the importance and excellence of women, breaking down the primacy of “fine art” over “indigenous art” or “folk” art. Other exhibits such as Filipina Migranteng Manggagawa (Filipina Migrant Workers), enacted an advocacy, discussion and analysis of the current Filipina diaspora of women labour. They also worked with women of Paete, Laguna in southern Luzon. There was an exchange of aesthetics and cultural practice that created an alternative local art practice, which challenges and transforms the state's tourist and cultural industries as it was funded by the National Commission for Culture and the Arts (NCCA). Cajipe-Endaya's works combines taka dolls from Paete, her hometown, to produce new images of women while challenging the boundaries between fine and folk art.

=== Pananaw Philippine Journal of Visual Arts ===
Cajipe-Endaya also established the National Commission for Culture and the Arts (NCCA) Philippines-funded Pananaw. She was a member of the Committee on Visual Arts, which was constituted under the law that created NCCA as the key cultural body that is liable to the Office of the President. The NCCA was focused on creating change from the ground up, with its roots in volunteer work, with practising artists from different disciplines, and Filipino indigenous communities from northern and southern Philippines. A number of volunteers found their participation within policy-making and government running, however as cultural workers, they were maintained to the notion of being second to “hard-ball politics”.

Cajipe-Endaya worked with Paul Zafaralla, in the group's Documentation, Research and Publications sub-committee in order to formulate the Visual Arts committee project: Pananaw. It was the first Filipino art journal of its kind, as it worked to change and resist the “manila-centric, market driven, blue chip master-inflected” art making and writing found within Philippines during the time that excluded a large majority of art produced and exhibited across the country. Cajipe-Endaya negotiated with a wide range of individuals that come from different, ideological, geographically based practices to come to agreements on the creation of Pananaw. The journal series then became non-profit due to the contingency of organisational figures, and changing duties within the committee structure. The non-profit body was shaped from a purely artist-driven group into one worked with critics, managers of culture, as well as gallerists in order to create productive discourses between actors within the art world. By the second volume, Cajipe-Endaya had stepped back from the position as project director, enabling the autonomous running of Pananaw, due to the momentum of young editors, writers, and artists that allowed the intersection between different streams of meaning-making.

== See also ==
- List of Filipino women artists
