= Agnes Arellano =

Philippine sculptor

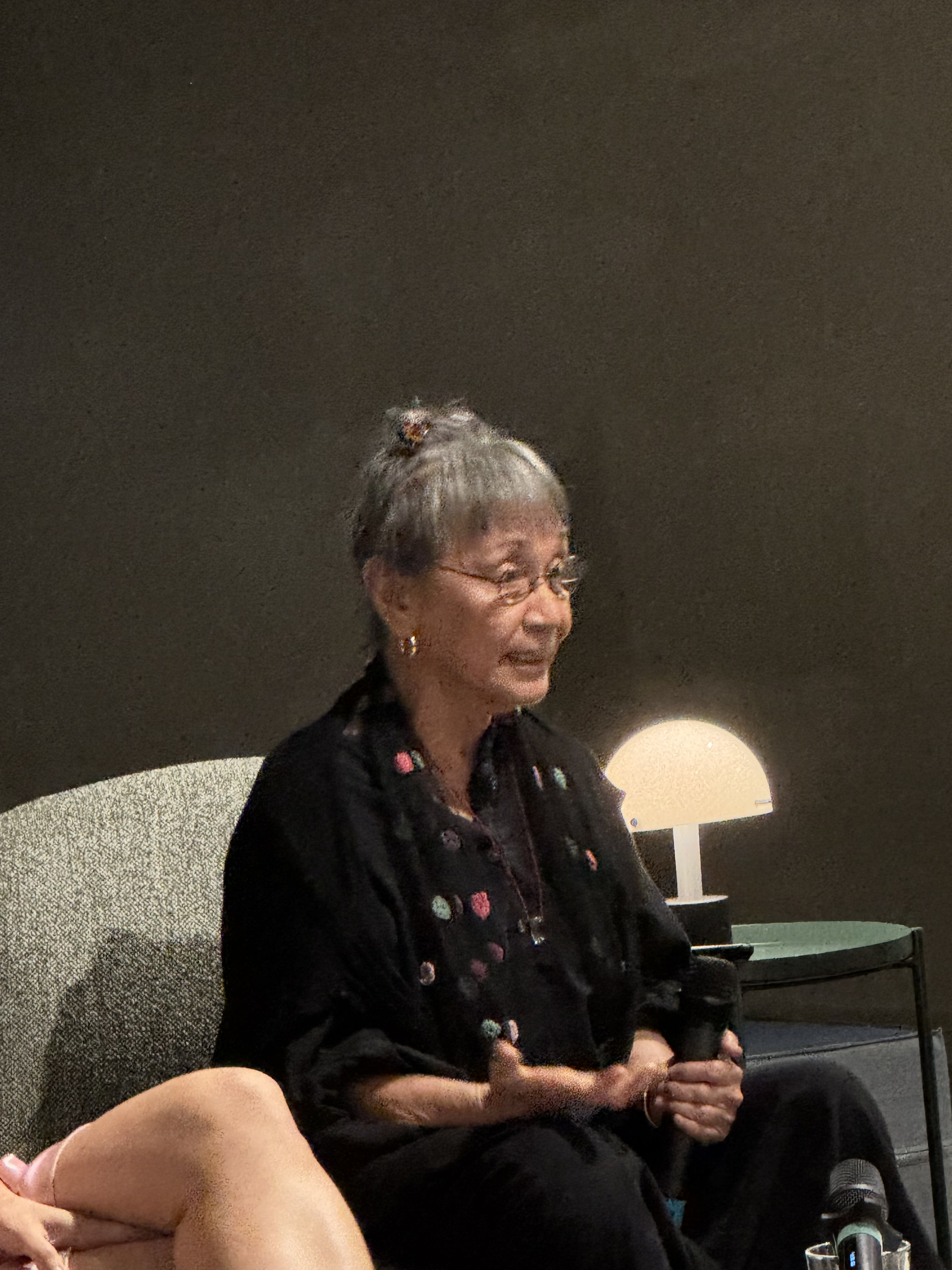
- Arellano in 2025
- Born: 21 November 1949 (age 76); San Juan, Philippines
- Education: University of the Philippines (UP)
- Known for: Surrealist sculptures
- Notable work: Fire and Death—A Labyrinth of Ritual Art (1988)
- Style: Surrealism, Expressionism
- Parents: Otilio Arellano (1916-1981) (father); Liwayway Almario (d. 1981) (mother)
- Relatives: Maria Felicitas (sister, d. 1981) Maria Lourdes (sister) Deogracias (brother)
- Awards: Thirteen Artists Award (1988)
- Website: http://www.agnesarellano.com/

Agnes Arellano (born 21 November 1949) is a sculptor from the Philippines known for her surrealistic and expressionist sculptural groupings. Her works tend to be provocative, often featuring nude female bodies in imposing positions or mutilated body parts. Common subjects include goddesses and other feminine figures from various faiths, with an emphasis on comparative mythology.

Arellano has held several exhibitions around the world, including in her native country, the United States, Germany, Japan, South Africa, and Singapore.

== Early life ==
Arellano was born in 1949 in San Juan, a highly urbanized city in the wider Manila metropolitan area. The Arellanos are a prominent and traditionally Catholic family in the area. Agnes Arellano attended the University of the Philippines (UP) in Quezon City, earning a bachelor's degree in psychology in 1971. She went to study at other universities across the globe before returning to the Philippines in 1979. While abroad, she became fascinated with art, and she decided to take more classes. Returning to UP, Arellano studied the fine arts with a focus on sculpture.

== Career ==
A family tragedy that occurred in 1981 determined the course of her career and the major themes in her art. Her parents, her sister Citas and a housemaid were killed in a fire that razed the Arellanos’ ancestral home in San Juan, Metro Manila. Arellano received news of the fire while she was on holiday in Spain. In memory of her late parents and sister, she decided to set up the nonprofit Pinaglabanan Galleries on the site of the ancestral home. Many unusual Philippine and foreign artworks were to be exhibited there, and talented artists were also given subsidies.

Arellano commemorated the tragic death of her parents and sister seven years later with a multimedia event called Fire and Death—A Labyrinth of Ritual Art. She created a unique installation consisting of a labyrinth of thematic shrines in the Arellano garden, combining sculptures, poetry, photographs, sound sculptures, plants, and family memorabilia. This demonstrated the deep sense of the precarious balance between death and life that she had become conscious of after the tragedy. This theme would find its way into many of her other works as well.

For over thirty years, Arellano has largely focused on making sculptures that evoke female deities or the interplay between life and death. Arellano has stated that she uses her art to call back to pre-colonial Filipino religion and culture, before the introduction of Christianity. According to Arellano, she wants to provoke strong reactions from audiences, and she doesn't focus on commercializing her works.

In 1988, Arellano won the Thirteen Artists Award from the Contemporary Art Museum of the Philippines in recognition of her daring and thoughtful sculptures. She has also won the Outstanding Alumna Award in the Field of Art from St. John's Academy and the Freeman Fellowship Residency from Vermont Studio Center.

Arellano's sculptures have been exhibited in numerous places around the world, including her native Philippines, Fukuoka, Busan, Singapore, New York City, Johannesburg, Brisbane, and Berlin.

== Style ==
Much of Arellano's work is characterized by imposing naked female figures imitating the appearances of female deities. During her travels around the world, Arellano became fascinated with Hinduism, Buddhism, Tantra, Chinese philosophy and folklore, and various Austronesian faiths, and her works often incorporate a mixture of elements and influences. In addition to religious figures, Arellano often utilizes the visages of real people. In many cases, female deities are molded on Arellano's own body. In time, the use of her own body as a mold became a method of blending reality and myth.

To Arellano, her sculptures are not merely works of art. They are also meant to have a personal component to their creation and presentation. Arellano uses the term “inscape” to refer to the combination of ideas and concepts in her sculptures as well as the environments they are situated in; each one reflects something about Arellano and her life experiences. Thus, her sculptures are meant to have an emotional and psychological presence in addition to their physical dimensions. To supplement her sculptures, Arellano incorporates poems and music into her inscapes, many of which come from other artists.

== Exhibitions ==
- Five Faces (1981)
- Five and Other Faces (1982)
- Six Artists (1983)
- Ex-Change: Berlin - Manila (1986)
- Thirteen Artists (1988)
- Ex-Change: Manila - Berlin (1988)
- Third Asian Art Show (1989)
- Sikat: Two Decades of Philippine Art (1989)
- Myths of Creation and Destruction Part II: The Temple of the Sun God (1990)
- Iskultura: From Anito to Assemblage (1991)
- Looking for the Tree of Life: A Journey to Asian Contemporary Art (1992)
- UP Faculty of Fine Arts Exhibition (1992)
- Fourth Baguio Art Festival (1993)
- Quinta Bienal de la Habana (1994)
- Asian Art Now (1994)
- Die 5. Biennale von Havana (1994)
- Ako: Self-Portraits from the 1800s to 1995 (1995)
- Africus: Johannesburg Biennial (1995)
- Traditions/Tensions: Contemporary Art in Asia (1996)
- The 11th Asian International Art Exhibition (1996)
- A Posterior View of Apartheid (1996)
- Sexta Bienal de la Habana (1997)
- Met Selection (1997)

== Awards ==
- Thirteen Artists Award, Contemporary Art Museum of the Philippines (1988)
- Outstanding Alumna Award in the Field of Art, St. John's Academy (1990)
- Freeman Fellowship Residency, Vermont Studio Center (1996)
