= Metropolitan Museum of Manila =

Art museum in Taguig, Philippines

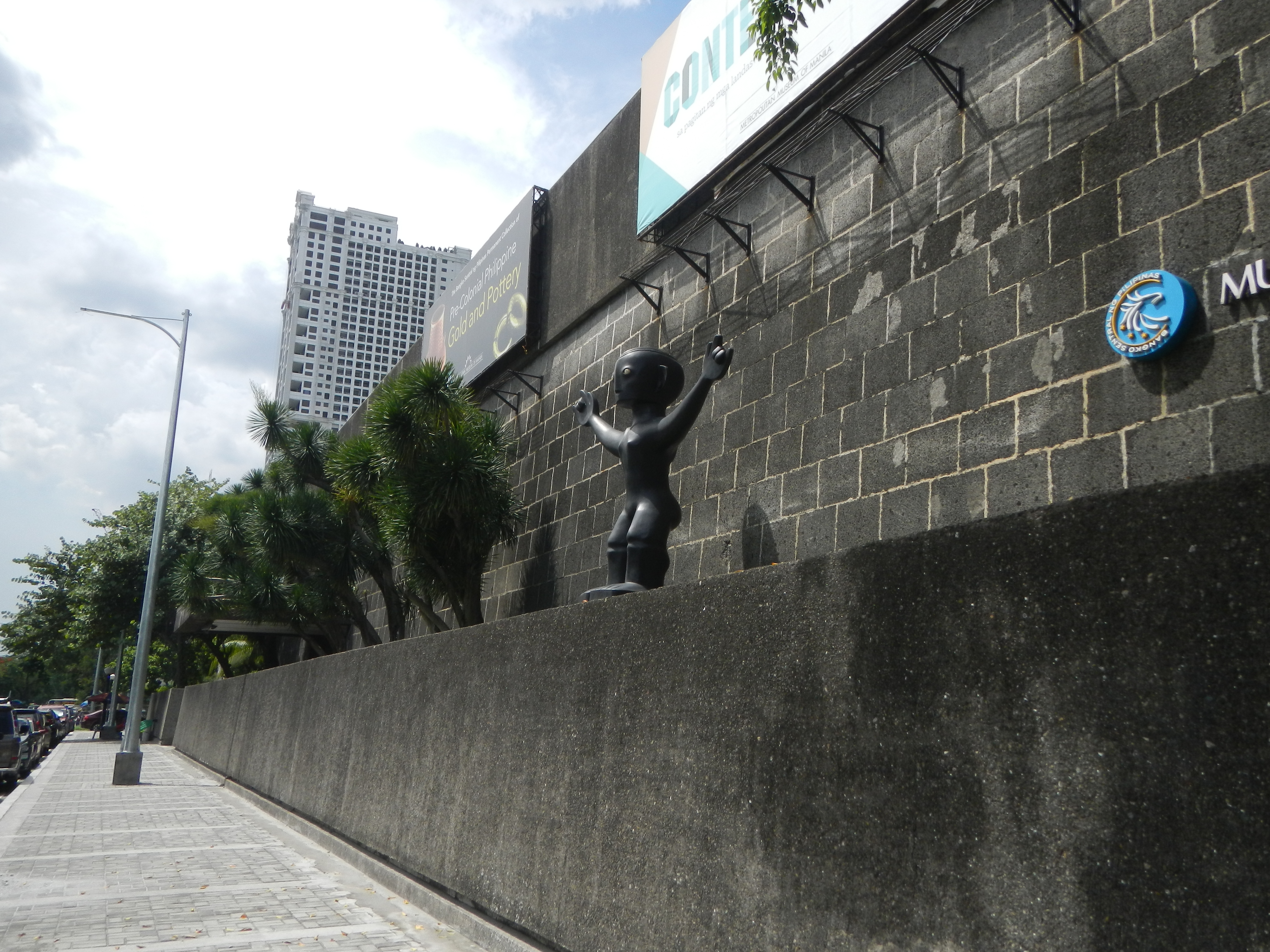
- Former location of the museum before its transfer to Taguig
- Established: October 3, 1976; 49 years ago
- Location: 30th Street, Bonifacio Global City, Taguig, Metro Manila, Philippines
- Coordinates: 14°33′05″N 121°03′03″E
- Type: Art museum; history museum
- Website: metmuseum.ph

The Metropolitan Museum of Manila, also branded as the M, is a non-profit art museum located in Bonifacio Global City (BGC) in Taguig, that exhibits local and international contemporary art. It bills itself as the Philippines' premier museum for modern and contemporary visual arts by local and international artists.

== History ==
Established since October 3, 1976, it was formerly located at the Bangko Sentral ng Pilipinas (BSP) Complex along Roxas Boulevard in the Malate district of Manila. The museum initially exhibited international artists to expose Filipinos to contemporary visual works in other cultures.

By 1986, its focus shifted to local works and extend its reach to more common people by offering bilingual exhibition texts and developing several outreach educational programs like workshops and symposia, thereby promoting local pride and identity. In September of that year, seven months after the EDSA Revolution, the museum acquired a new board of trustees and became a non-government organization.

Since 2022, the M has been relocated to its dedicated premises at the MK Tan Centre within the business district of Bonifacio Global City in Taguig. Formerly subsidized by the BSP, the management of the museum has now shifted to the Metropolitan Museum of Manila Foundation, Inc., initially established by former First Lady Imelda Marcos and businessman Bienvenido Tantoco, Sr. in 1979.

The museum, which previously offered complimentary entry on Tuesdays, has extended this to all days during its operating hours from Tuesdays to Saturdays.

== Banksy exhibit ==
In April 2024, the museum announced a teaser for an upcoming exhibition called Banksy Universe, causing speculation on whether the exhibit would include works by Banksy. However, the announcement also caused criticism as some contrasted Banksy's use of street art with the prevailing restrictions on street art and graffiti enforced in Bonifacio Global City, while others criticized the exhibition for running counter to Banksy's subversive and anti-capitalist messaging in his art. Banksy's managing agency, Pest Control, denied involvement in the upcoming exhibit. The museum stated that the exhibit, like many Banksy exhibitions in museums around the world, was “not authorized or endorsed” by Banksy, and was instead created in partnership with an international art production collective to display Banksy's works in an immersive setup. The exhibit opened on May 14, 2024 and lasted until November 20.
