= Art Association of the Philippines =

The Art Association of the Philippines (AAP) is an art organization that aims to "advance and foster, and promote the interests of those who work in the visual arts."
