= Brenda Fajardo =

Filipina artist and printmaker (1940–2024)

Brenda Villanueva Fajardo
- Born: February 18, 1940; Manila, Commonwealth of the Philippines
- Died: September 14, 2024 (aged 84)
- Education: University of the Philippines Los Baños; University of Wisconsin-Madison (MS); University of the Philippines Diliman (PhD)
- Occupations: Visual artist, professor, curator
- Known for: Painting, printmaking

Brenda Fajardo (February 18, 1940 – September 14, 2024) was a Filipino art teacher, visual artist, and printmaker. Her work centered on social issues, women's issues, and the colonial history of the Philippines, with focus on the "aesthetics of poverty and the art of the people". She was a professor Emerita in the department of Art Studies at the University of the Philippines.

== Early life and education ==
Fajardo was born in Manila on February 18, 1940. Originally interested in becoming a professional dancer, she was diagnosed with rheumatic fever at the age of 14. Her mother then suggested she take art lessons under Filipina artist Araceli Dans.

Fajardo earned a degree in agriculture from the University of the Philippines Los Baños in 1959, followed by her MS in art education at the University of Wisconsin-Madison. Upon returning to the Philippines, Fajardo taught art education throughout the early 1960s. She later earned her PhD in Philippine Studies from the University of the Philippines Diliman.

== Career ==
Fajardo was described as a "visual artist and educator who brings local folk culture to the international forefront" and a "pioneer of the craft of Philippine printmaking". She has produced work focusing on both the Philippine diaspora and Philippine epic poetry. Fajardo is best known for her tarot card series, which examines Philippine history, culture, and women's issues. Critics have cited her use of tarot cards to provide commentary on the Philippines' struggles "with socio-political issues, colonial history, and ongoing poverty"; whereas tarot cards are intended to reveal the future, Fajardo's work uses them to examine the past. Art critic Alice Guillermo called Fajardo the "high priestess of tarot".

Fajardo co-founded the Philippine Art Educators Association (PAEA) in 1967 whose purpose is to train teachers on how to better teach art within the school system. Observing how art education in the Philippines was primarily focused in training students for art production, Fajardo advocated for teaching traditional Filipino "folk art" and better exploring the "Philippine identity" through art.

Fajardo's works have been exhibited internationally, including Singapore, Cuba, Brisbane, Paris, and in her native Santa Cruz, Laguna.

In the late 1990s, Fajardo was the curator of the Vargas Museum.

== Death ==
Fajardo died on September 14, 2024, at the age of 84.

== Awards and honors ==
- In 1992, Fajardo received the Thirteen Artists award from the Cultural Center of the Philippines
- In 1998, Fajardo received the Centennial Award for the Arts also from the Cultural Center of the Philippines
- In 2012, Fajardo was awarded the Gawad CCP Para sa Sining award for Visual Arts

== See also ==
- List of Filipino women artists
