= Nestor Leynes =

Filipino realist painter

- Born: Nestor Garcia Leynes; February 26, 1922; Santa Cruz, Manila, Philippine Islands
- Died: March 18, 2016 (aged 94); Quezon City, Philippines
- Education: University of the Philippines
- Known for: Painting
- Notable work: See below
- Movement: Realism

Nestor Garcia Leynes, Sr (February 26, 1922 – March 18, 2016) was a Filipino realist painter. Leynes is regarded as one of the leaders of the "Magic Realist" movement of the Philippines. He was born in Santa Cruz, Manila.

== Biography ==
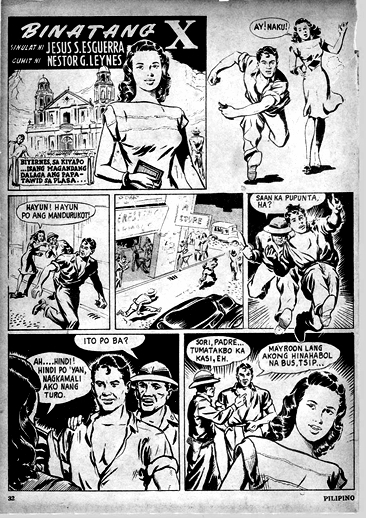
Binatang X (1947), illustrated by Nestor Leynes.

Leynes was born on February 26, 1922, in Santa Cruz, Manila. His parents were Ricardo Leynes, a doctor, and Enriqueta Garcia, a registered nurse. He had three brothers and a sister. Leynes' parents owned several paintings, including some by the Filipino master painter Fabián Cueto de la Rosa, a distant relative of the family. Probably influenced by his environment, Leynes already expressed the desire to be an artist from a young age. His parents discouraged this ambition, fearing a life of hardship for him.

Nevertheless, Leynes was already taking art lessons in grade school and highschool. He graduated from the Arellano High School and entered the College of Fine Arts of the University of the Philippines. His studies were cut short in his fourth year by the Japanese invasion of the Philippines in World War II. Two days after the bombing of Pearl Harbor, he married Amalia Alcantara, a childhood neighbor and sweetheart.

Being already married, Leynes never returned to school after the war and thus never graduated. He found work as an illustrator for Ramon Roces Publications. He created illustrations for magazines like Liwayway and Philippine comics. He was hired as a staff artist for the Philippine Advertising Counsel. Later on, he became the executive vice president for the art department of the J. Romero and Associates Advertising Agency. Leynes resumed painting full-time after retiring in 1980 at the age of fifty eight. He died in March 2016 at the age of 94.

== Work ==
Pandanggo sa Ilaw (1966), a pre-Realism work by Leynes.

Duyan ('Cradle') showing Leynes' favorite subjects - the mother and child.

Mag-ina sa Banig

Leynes was strongly influenced by his professors during his time at the University of the Philippines. Among them were the Philippine National Artist Fernando Amorsolo and his younger brother Pablo Amorsolo.

In 1976, Leynes discovered the works of Andrew Wyeth, a realist American painter whose works became popular in the Philippines during this period. Along with several other artists like Ger Viterbo, Jr., Joselito Barcelona, Emmanuel Llado, and Jaime Roque they formed a group known as the "Magic Realists" (not be confused with a separate movement known as Magic realism), after Wyeth's style.

Leynes' first contribution was his 1977 work Bigas ('Rice', also known as Pitong Gatang). It was widely acclaimed for its attention to detail. Former first lady Imelda Marcos was so impressed by the work that she brought the entire collection to the Malacañan Palace for the viewing of her then guest of honor David Rockefeller. Marcos bought several paintings, while Rockefeller bought two. The painting Bigas was among those looted from the palace during the People Power Revolution of 1986.

Leynes diverged from Wyeth's use of drab colors. Like other Filipino realist painters, he retained Amorsolo's influence, particularly in the use of light. While American realism focused on banality, Leynes and other Filipino realists depict romantic scenes in painstaking detail.

Right now, the Magic Realism in the Philippines is slightly different. It has a local effect. Andrew Wyeth lived in Maine, in the U.S. and it is a very cold place. . . . the atmosphere was grays and browns. I couldn’t live with that kind of attitude towards my art because it is not my atmosphere. I live in the Philippines and like Amorsolo, I project what I see, the atmosphere I see around.

— Nestor Garcia Leynes, Visions and voices (1980)

Leynes' subjects are typically scenes of Philippine rural life, ranging from women sifting rice (like Bigas ni Lorna) to harvest scenes. He is best known for his favorite subject, that of the mother and child. He regularly paints a picture of Christ every Good Friday, a part of his panata (penance) during Lent.

His works were exhibited along with other Bangko Sentral ng Pilipinas (BSP) Collection paintings in the 2010 exhibit Sulyap, Yugto, Dalipay: Mementos of Philippine Everyday of the Metropolitan Museum of Manila. Although not representative of his work, his oil on canvas piece A Peasant's Funeral (1948) is on display at the National Museum of the Philippines.

== Selected works ==
948)

- Old Balara (1950)
- Bigas (1977)
- Pandanggo sa Ilaw (1966)
- Paligo sa Batya (1968)
- Carousel (1960)
- Boo Gene (1976)
- Sinelas (1974)
- Mais (2021)
- Caravan (1980)
- Dalampasigan (1986)
- Gintong Butil (1995)

== See also ==
- Vicente Manansala
