= Amorsolo (disambiguation) =

Fernando Amorsolo (1892–1972) was a Filipino painter.

It may also refer to:

- Pablo Amorsolo (1898–1945), Filipino painter, younger brother of Fernando
- Sylvia Amorsolo-Lazo (born 1943), Filipino painter, daughter of Fernando
- Amorsolo Street, a minor north-south roadway in Makati, Metro Manila, Philippines
- The Beacon – Amorsolo Tower, a planned residential condominium skyscraper in Makati, Philippines
