= Eula Valdez =

Filipino actress (born 1968)

Eula Valdes
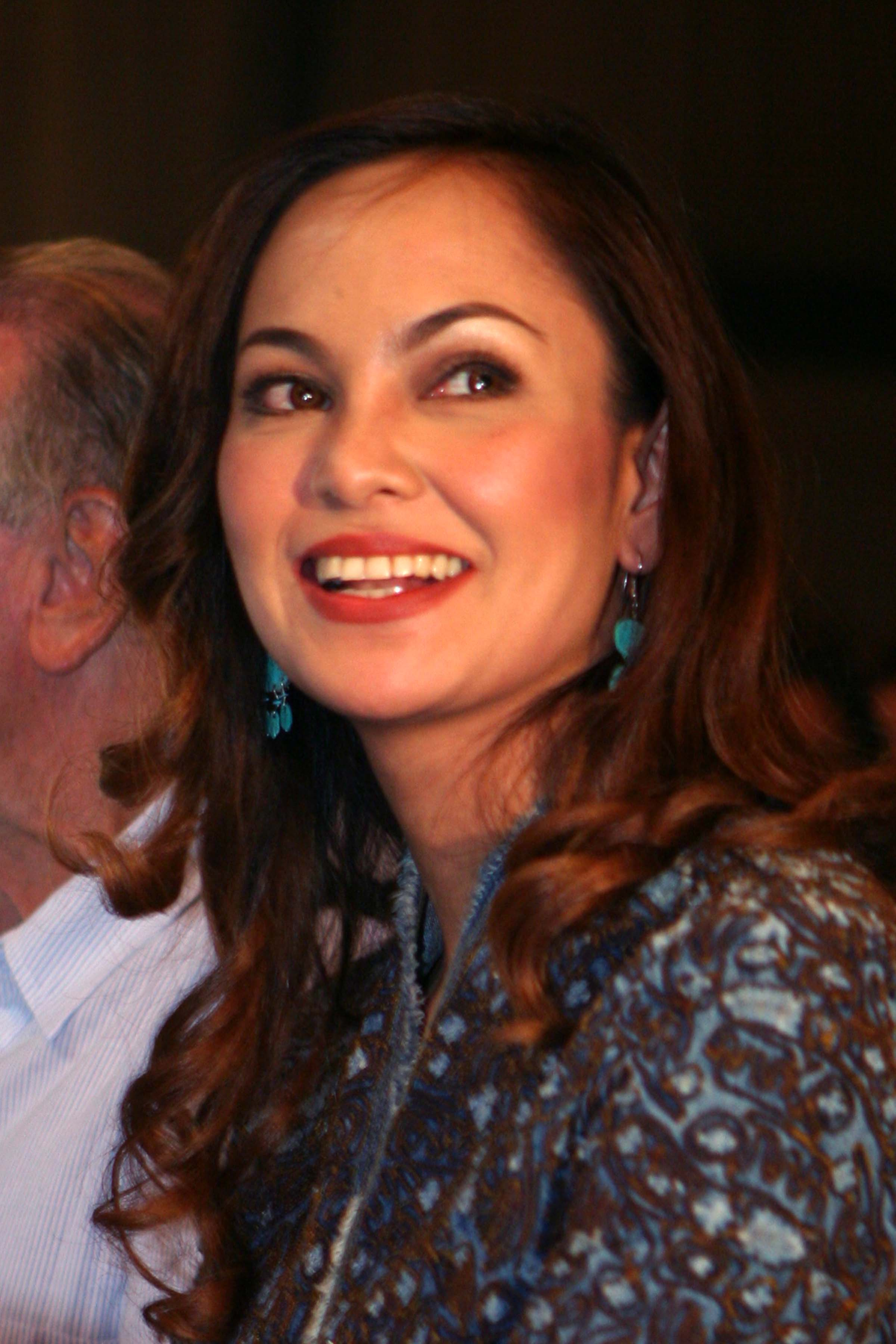
- Born: Maria Julia Amorsolo-Valdes; December 11, 1968 (age 57); San Miguel, Manila, Philippines
- Occupations: Actress; singer
- Years active: 1983–present
- Spouse: Richard Litonjua (m. 2003; sep. 2009)
- Partner: Ronnie Smith Quizon (1993–2002)
- Children: 2
- Relatives: Fernando Amorsolo (grandfather); Paolo Ballesteros (nephew); Sylvia Amorsolo-Lazo (aunt); Pablo Amorsolo (granduncle); Frankie Evangelista (uncle); Emil Valdes (uncle)

Maria Julia Amorsolo-Valdes (born December 11, 1968), professionally known as Eula Valdes (Tagalog: [ˈjʊlɐ bɐlˈdɛs]), is a Filipino actress and singer, best known for her prominent role as Amor Powers in the original version of Pangako Sa 'Yo (2000) and as Janice in the Bagets film series (1984).

== Early life ==
Valdes was born at Singian Clinic (later became Singian Hospital) on December 11, 1968, in San Miguel, Manila to Estanislao Fermin Valdes (March 28, 1920, in Gapan, Nueva Ecija - March 24, 1988) and Gracia Jorge Amorsolo (November 24, 1927, in Binondo, Manila - February 5, 2004, in Las Piñas). Her maternal grandfather was Filipino painter Fernando Amorsolo. She graduated with a Bachelor of Arts in Asian Studies at University of Santo Tomas Faculty of Arts and Letters and was a volleyball varsity player.

== Career ==
Valdes became part of the series Marinella starring Camille Prats, Shaina Magdayao and Serena Dalrymple but she gained more popularity during her portrayal as "Amor de Jesus-Powers" in the ABS-CBN television series Pangako Sa ’Yo in 2000 starring Kristine Hermosa, Jericho Rosales and Jean Garcia. In 2003, she was cast as Mira B. Cordero in the drama series Darating ang Umaga created by Jose Javier Reyes, but the series garnered low ratings. In 2005 she joined Pablo S. Gomez's Kampanerang Kuba playing Lourdes Saavedra.

In 2007 she starred in the TV series Maria Flordeluna, and after the ending of the series she did a follow-up series on ABS-CBN's rival network titled Kamandag aired on GMA Network starring Richard Gutierrez. Since then she became part of GMA Network's female lead actress and starred in multiple series such All About Eve, the short-lived Saturday paranormal series E.S.P. and LaLola. In 2009, she went back to ABS-CBN to do the primetime hit series The Wedding, then in 2010 The Last Prince and the afternoon series Koreana. In 2011, Eula was part of the remake of Mula sa Puso as her comeback project to ABS-CBN where she played Selina Matias (originally portrayed by Princess Punzalan based on the 1997 primetime drama series of the same name). On the 20th anniversary of MMK, she is the most featured actress with the most episodes (32 episodes, as of 2014) and she was hailed "MMK Queen". In 2012, as her comeback as a contract artist she plays Olivia La Peña-San Juan on the film remake turned TV series Mundo Man ay Magunaw which was originally portrayed by Susan Roces and will be Black Lily at the book two of Walang Hanggan.

In 2014, Valdes returned to GMA-7 after Dyesebel and did Ilustrado, Elemento, The Half Sisters, two TAPE Inc. - GMA Network produced shows, Princess in the Palace and Calle Siete, Hahamakin ang Lahat, and the reboot role of Queen Avria in the 2016 version of Encantadia.

In 2017, she switched back to ABS-CBN. She starred in the TV series The Good Son wherein she portrayed the role of Olivia Buenavidez, the manipulative and scheming wife of Victor Buenavidez. In 2019, she starred in The General's Daughter, portraying Corazon de Leon, a loving wife and mother. Then in 2020, she played Lucy Wong in Love Thy Woman, a fierce and overprotective mother and wife. In 2021, she portrayed Deborah delos Santos in Huwag Kang Mangamba, a religious fanatic turned faith healer.

In 2022, she returned to GMA Network as Amanda in Return to Paradise.

== Awards ==
- 1998 - Highly Commended in Asian TV Awards in Singapore (MMK: "Talaarawan")
- 2001 - Star Awards Best Actress in a Drama Series (Pangako Sa 'Yo)
- 2002 - Jose Rizal Award of Excellence Top Entertainer Award as Best Actress (Pangako Sa 'Yo)
- 2003 - Asian TV Awards Best Actress Nomination
- 2003 - Asian TV Awards Best Actress in Singapore (MMK: "Karinderia")
- 2006 - Aliw Awards Best Actress in a musical (ZsaZsa Zaturnnah)
- 2011 - Broadway World Philippines Best Featured Actress in a Musical (Nine)
- 2014 - Cinemalaya Best Actress (Dagitab)
- 2015 - Young Critics Circle Best Performance (Dagitab)
- 2015 - Gawad Urian Best Actress (Dagitab)
- 2017 - Gawad Tanglaw Best Actress (Neomanila)

== Filmography ==
=== Film ===
- Bagets (1984) – Janice
- Hotshots (1984) – Elaine
- Bagets 2 (1984) – Janice
- Bukas Luluhod ang Mga Tala (1984) – Monette Estrella
- Buy One, Take One (1988)
- Rosenda (1989)
- Bala... Dapat kay Cris Cuenca, Public Enemy No. 1 (1989)
- Hindi Pahuhuli ng Buhay (1989)
- Kapag Langit ang Humatol (1990) – Nelia
- Barbi for President (1991)
- Ready, Get Set, Go! (1992)
- GMA Telecine Specials (1992)
- Dahil Mahal Kita (1993)
- Tumbasan Mo ng Buhay (1993)
- Maalaala Mo Kaya: The Movie (1994) – Gigi
- Lagalag: The Eddie Fernandez Story (1994) – Sara
- Sana Maulit Muli (1995) – Margie
- Radio Romance (1996) – Mylene Cordero
- Madrasta (1996) – Luchi
- Ikaw Pala ang Mahal Ko (1997)
- Batang PX (1997) – Maribeth
- Hanggang Kailan Kita Mamahalin (1997)
- Sgt. Victor Samson: Akin ang Batas (1997)
- Ang Pulubi at ang Prinsesa (1997) – Rosalie's mom
- Pagdating ng Panahon (1998)
- Magandang Hatinggabi (1998) – Carla
- Ang Babae sa Bintana (1998)
- Mula sa Puso: The Movie (1999) – Criselda Pereira
- Gimik: The Reunion (1999) – Brenda
- Umaga, Tanghali, Gabi (television film, 2000)
- Di Kita Ma-reach (2001) – Fiscal Lourdes Palma
- Noon at Ngayon: Pagsasamang Kay Ganda (2003) – Sylvia
- Ina, Anak, Pamilya (2006)
- Nagmamahal, Kapamilya (2006) – Louisa
- Rekados (2006)
- Ang Manghuhula (2009)
- The Red Shoes (2010) – Corazon Aquino
- Working Girls (2010) – Dr. Cleo Carillo
- Rosario (2010) – Donya Adela
- Born to Love You (2012) – Sylvia
- The Bit Player (2013) – Herself
- David F. (2013)
- Bingoleras (2013)
- Dagitab (2014) – Issey Tolentino
- Pwera Usog (2016) – Catalina
- Our Mighty Yaya (2017)
- Neomanila (2017) – Irma
- Paki (Please Care) (2017)
- The Leaving (2018) – Dolores "Oreng"
- Love Is Color Blind (2021) – Ella Villanueva-Urbano
- Martyr or Murderer (2023) – older Imee Marcos
- Nokturno (2024) – Lilet
- The Kingdom (2024) - Queen Lakambini Hiraya
- Lilim (2025) - Sr Marga
- Paglilitis (2025)

=== Television/digital series ===
Year	Title	Role	Notes
1991–1995	Maalaala Mo Kaya	Various roles	—
1992–1995	Ready, Get Set Go!	—	—
1996	Familia Zaragoza	Nimfa	—
1996–1997	Lyra	Gina Monteverde	—
1997	Wansapanataym: Bessy Basura		—
1998–1999	Halik sa Apoy	Delia	—
1998	Maalaala Mo Kaya: Talaarawan	Justina	—
1999–2000	Marinella	Lilybeth "Bebeng" Santiago	—
1999	Maalaala Mo Kaya: Wrist Watch	May	—
2000	Wansapanataym: Mandy Dekwat		—
2000–2002	Pangako Sa 'Yo	Amor De Jesus-Powers	—
2003	Wansapanataym: Sweet Dreams, Pleasant Dreams	Sweet Dreams	—
2003	Darating ang Umaga	Almira "Mira" Banal-Cordero	—
2005	Pablo S. Gomez's Kampanerang Kuba	Lourdes Saavedra-De Vega	—
2005–2006	Makuha Ka sa Tikim	Herself - Co-host	—
2006	Star Circle Quest	Herself - Quest Juror	—
2007	Maria Flordeluna	Josephine "Jo" Espero-Alicante	—
2007	Mga Mata ni Anghelita	Bernice	—
2007–2008	Carlo J. Caparas' Kamandag	Alicia	—
2008–2009	LaLola	Susanna Fuentebella-Lobregat	—
2009	All About Eve	Alma Bautista-Gonzales	—
2009	The Wedding	Audrey De Meñes	—
2009–2010	Dear Friend: My Christmas List	Enzo's Mother	—
2010	The Last Prince	Adela	—
2010–2011	Koreana	Violeta Jung/Salcedo	—
2011	Mula sa Puso	Selina Pereira-Matias	—
2011	Ikaw ay Pag-Ibig	Ms. Castro	—
2011	Protégé: The Battle for the Big Break	Herself - Judge	—
2012	Mundo Man ay Magunaw	Olivia "Olive" San Juan-La Peña	—
2012	Walang Hanggan	Jean "Black Lily" Bonifacio / Jane Bonifacio-Montenegro	Main cast / anti-hero
2012–2013	A Beautiful Affair	Carlotta Pierro	—
2013	Cassandra: Warrior Angel	Larissa / Gloria Cruz	—
2013	Kahit Nasaan Ka Man	Theresa De Chavez	—
2013	Magpakailanman	Marissa Lopez	—
2014	Mars Ravelo's Dyesebel	Reyna Dyangga	—
2014	Ilustrado	Teodora "Doña Lolay" Alonzo y Mercado	—
2014	Elemento		—
2014	Magpakailanman	Faith	—
2015–2016	The Half Sisters	Ysabel Zúñiga-Dela Rhea y Valdicañas	118 episodes
2015	Magpakailanman	Rosalyn	—
2015–2016	Princess in the Palace	Leonora Clarissa "Leona" Jacinto-Gonzaga	—
2016	Calle Siete	Sheila Mabuhay-Sebastian	—
2016–2017	Hahamakin ang Lahat	Ivy Tan	—
2017	Encantadia	Hara Avria	—
2017–2018	The Good Son	Olivia Gesmundo-Buenavidez†	Main cast / primary antagonist
2018	Tadhana: The Revenge	Dina	—
2018	Maalaala Mo Kaya: Drawing	Jane	—
2018–2019	Kadenang Ginto	Rosanna Andrada	Special participation / protagonist
2019	The General's Daughter	Corazon De Leon	Main cast / anti-hero
2020	Love Thy Woman	Lucy Gongsu-Wong	Main cast / antagonist
2021	Huwag Kang Mangamba	Deborah "Santa Deborah" Delos Santos	Supporting cast / primary antagonist
2021	Tadhana: Sa Ngalan ng Ama	Coco	Main cast / protagonist
2022	Magpakailanman: My Father's Killer	Imelda	Main cast / protagonist
2022	Return to Paradise	Amanda Sta. Maria-Madrigal	Supporting Cast / Protagonist / Anti-hero
2022	Tadhana: Pahiram ng Pasko	Fatima	—
2023	Unbreak My Heart	Vangie Isidro	Supporting cast / protagonist
2024	Magpakailanman: The Blind Pianist	Cion	—
2024–2025	Forever Young	Esmeralda Vergara	Main cast / Primary Antagonist / Finale Anti-Hero
2025—2026	Totoy Bato	Ruby Roco-Perez	—
2025—2026	Sanggang-Dikit FR	Bryna Garcia	Supporting Cast / protagonist

== Discography ==
=== Albums ===
- Schizo (EMI/PolyEast, 2008)

=== Singles ===
- Minahal Kita (I Loved You) (2008)
