= Darating ang Umaga =

2003 Philippine television series

- Title card
- Also known as: Till Morning Comes
- Genre: Romance; Family drama; Fantasy
- Created by: ABS-CBN Studios
- Developed by: ABS-CBN Studios; Star Cinema
- Written by: Dado C. Lumibao; Maribel Ilag; Gilbeys Sardea; Michiko Yamamoto
- Directed by: Rory B. Quintos; Mae Czarina Cruz
- Starring: Eula Valdez; Vina Morales; Ian Veneracion; Patrick Garcia; Jodi Sta. Maria; Danilo Barrios; Aiza Marquez; Sharmaine Suarez
- Opening theme: "Saan Darating Ang Umaga?" by Vina Morales
- Composer: George Canseco
- Country of origin: Philippines
- Original language: Filipino
- No. of episodes: 183

Production
- Executive producers: Carlo Katigbak; Cory Vidanes; Laurenti Dyogi; Malou N. Santos
- Producers: Raymund G. Dizon; Maru R. Benitez; Ricky Lee; Edlyn Tallada-Abuel
- Running time: 15-33 minutes
- Production company: Star Creatives

Original release
- Network: ABS-CBN
- Release: March 3 – November 14, 2003

Darating ang Umaga (transl. the morning will come, international title: Till Morning Comes) is a Philippine television drama series broadcast by ABS-CBN. Starring Eula Valdez and Vina Morales, along with an ensemble cast, it aired on the network's Teleserye Primetime Bida line up from March 3 to November 14, 2003, replacing Sa Dulo ng Walang Hanggan and was replaced by Meteor Fever in Manila.

== Premise ==
A medallion is crafted to bring fortune to the Banal Family and to their next generations of kin. Eventually, greed prevails and the medallion is broken into two, thereon carrying a curse in the entire Banal clan. The curse soon came in the form of a man named Don Lucio Riego de Dios. With his arrival in the lives of Milagros and Ramon, a cycle of endless and ruthless sufferings begin until these misfortunes are carried on to their daughters (Mira and Arriana) and to everyone they are bound to love. Their only chance to experience happiness and peace rests on the mending of the broken medallion. Don Lucio however, vows never to see the end of the curse on the Banals. It is Arriana's mission to save her family from oppression, but it entails a sacrifice that may be far greater than what Arriana is able to make.

== Cast and characters ==
Main cast

- Eula Valdez as Almira "Mira" Banal-Cordero
- Vina Morales as Arriana "Anya" Banal-Cordero
- Ian Veneracion as Jaime Abelardo "Abel" Reverente
- Jodi Sta. Maria as Nicole del Fuego
- Patrick Garcia as Nathaniel Cordero-Reverente
- Danilo Barrios as Daniel / Rafael Cordero-Reverente
- Aiza Marquez as Ella
- Sharmaine Suarez as Savannah Deogracias

Supporting cast

- Dante Rivero as Don Lucio Riego de Dios (Main Antagonist)
  - Emilio Garcia as young Don Lucio
- Daria Ramirez as Milagros Banal-Cordero
- Bobby Andrews as Raymond de Dios (Anti-hero)
- Glydel Mercado as Gertrudis "Trudis" Del Fuego
- Aljon Jimenez as Dagon Del Fuego
- Sarji Ruiz as Timothy Del Fuego
- Maribeth Bichara as Venny
- Izza Ignacio as Tere
- William Lorenzo as Dado
- Phytos Ramirez as Ken

Recurring cast

- Maritoni Fernandez as Fiona
- James Cooper as Casper
- Ketchup Eusebio as Presto
- Jojit Lorenzo as Gabby
- Richard Quan as Leo
- Beverly Salviejo as Rosea
- Eva Darren as Olinda Deogracias
- Glenda Garcia as Raquel
- Codie Moreno as Voltaire
- Yuuki Kadooka as Bodgie
- Brandon Legaspi
- Lui Villaruz as fake Daniel

Guest cast

- Spanky Manikan as Ramon Cordero

== Trivia ==
- This was Jodi Sta. Maria and Ian Veneracion's first TV series together, with Veneracion portraying Sta. Maria's father-in-law. Twelve years later, they reunited in the 2015 remake of Pangako Sa 'Yo, which would catapult them into a popular love-team. Additionally, Eula Valdez made her primetime television comeback in this series, with her last TV drama being the original series of the same title which ended in September 2002.
- Darating ang Umaga had at least three reruns on different channels and platforms. The show first re-aired in 2006 on Pinoy Central TV (now called Kapamilya Channel, while a second re-airing occurred in 2007 with English dubbing. The third one occurred in 2026, when replays were broadcast on Kapamilya Online Live.
- It was considered to be the 50th Soap Opera Offering of ABS-CBN, coinciding with the golden (50th) anniversary of the network (commonly known as "ABS-CBN's 50th Year of Television").
- Darating ang Umaga marked Vina Morales and Eula Valdez's first team-up on primetime television. Their next project together would come four years later in Maria Flordeluna, the 2007 remake of Loida Virina's 1980s soap opera "Flordeluna".
- The theme song of the soap opera was originally performed by Raymond Lauchengco, which also served as the theme song of the 1983 film of the same title. In 2008, the theme song was reused by GMA Network, ABS-CBN's then-rival TV network, for their afternoon TV series Sine Novela: Saan Darating ang Umaga?. Two more TV series (or "teleseryes") used the same theme song in the 2010s, albeit sung by different singers: the first was ABS-CBN's Budoy in 2011, and the second was GMA's Pyra: Babaeng Apoy in 2013.
- Ian Veneracion played the father of Patrick Garcia's character despite being only 6 years older than the former in real life.
- This series broke the six-year streak of three consecutive soap operas airing on the same time slot that starred Claudine Barretto: Mula sa Puso (1997–1999), Saan Ka Man Naroroon (1999–2001) and Sa Dulo ng Walang Hanggan (2001–2003).

== See also ==
- List of dramas of ABS-CBN
- List of programs aired by ABS-CBN
