= Enrique Belo =

Filipino politician (1922–2004)

The Honourable Enrique M. Belo

Member of the Batasang Pambansa from Capiz
- In office June 30, 1984 – March 25, 1986 Serving with Charles Escolin

Personal details
- Born: Enrique Malaya Fernando; September 8, 1922 Roxas City, Capiz
- Died: December 23, 2004 (aged 82)
- Party: UNIDO
- Children: Dr. Vicki Belo (adopted)
- Education: University of the Philippines, Harvard Law School
- Occupation: Lawyer, politician, diplomat

Enrique Malaya Belo (September 8, 1922 – December 23, 2004) was a Filipino lawyer, educator, diplomat, and politician. He was a delegate to the 1971 Constitutional Convention. He served to the Batasang Pambansa from 1984 to 1986, as representative for Capiz.

== Early life and education ==
Belo was born to Antonio Belo and Candida Malaya on September 8, 1922, at Roxas City, Capiz.

He graduated with an Associate of Arts degree in 1946 and a Bachelor of Laws (cum laude and class valedictorian) in 1949, both from the University of the Philippines. There, he joined the Upsilon Sigma Phi and served as chairman of the Philippine Law Journal Student Editorial Board. He placed 6th in the 1949 Philippine Bar Examinations.

He received his Master of Laws from Harvard Law School in 1951. He was inducted into the Phi Kappa Phi honor society.

== Legal career ==
From 1953 to 1963, Belo taught as a professor of law at the Lyceum of the Philippines.

Belo was a senior partner at the Belo, Gozon, Elma, Parel, Asuncion, & Lucilo Law Firm. (BGEPAL Law) together with Felipe Gozon. He was Senior Partner at Ponce, Enrile, Siguion Reyna, Montecillo & Belo from 1956 to 1972.

He was a member of the Philippine Bar Association where he served as director from 1962 to 1967 and 1973–1986, and President from 1974 to 1975.

== Political career ==
Belo served as Vice Consul for Thailand in the Philippines from 1956 to 1992. He was granted Knight of the Order, While Elephant by the King of Thailand.

In 1970, Belo was elected as a Delegate to the 1971 Constitutional Convention representing the First District of Capiz. He was elected as a Member of Parliament as Representative for Capiz at the Batasang Pambansa and served from 1984 to 1986.

== Personal life ==
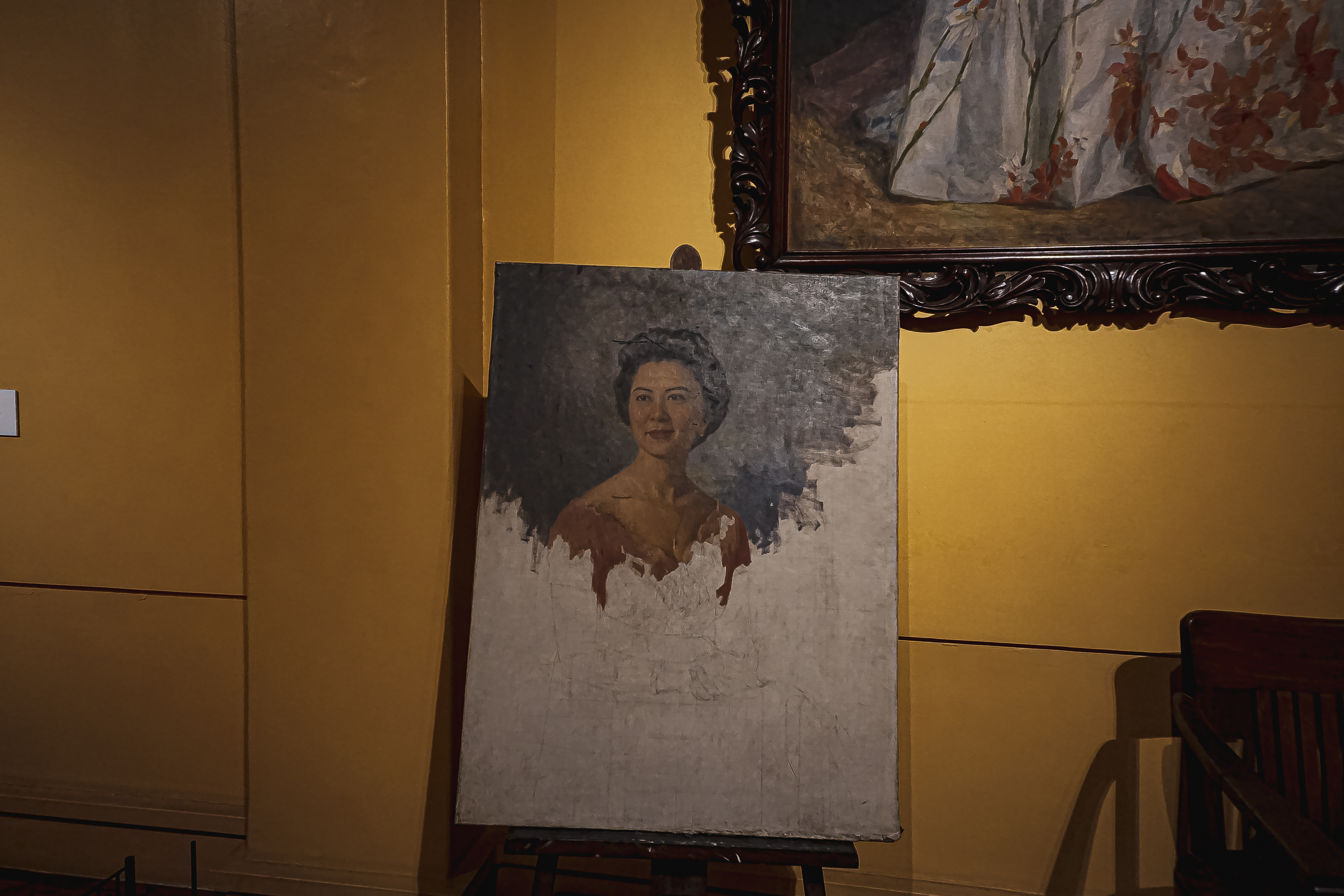
Florencia "Nena" Singson Gonzalez-Belo

Belo married Florencia "Nena" Singson Gonzales. He is the adoptive father of Filipino celebrity and dermatologist Vicki Belo.

In 2018, the National Museum of the Philippines officially identified Fernando Amorsolo's last known painting of an unfinished creative work of the late Florencia "Nena" Singson Gonzalez-Belo (September 29, 1927-May 11, 2016), mother of Vicki Belo. It was donated by Amorsolo's widow, Maria del Carmen Amorsolo as confirmed in 2016 by Judy Araneta Roxas. Vicki Belo further affirmed that her mother's five sisters had Amorsolo paintings. The painting stood at the National Museum of the Philippines' Gallery VI since 2015.

== Death ==
Belo died on December 23, 2004.
