= The Last Pinoy Action King =

Philippine documentary film

- Directed by: Andrew Leavold; Daniel Palisa
- Story by: Andrew Leavold; Daniel Palisa
- Produced by: Andrew Leavold; Daniel Palisa
- Cinematography: Jet Leyco; Rommel Ruiz
- Edited by: Lawrence Ang; Dezza Rodriguez; Pao Dalisay
- Music by: The Screaming Meanies
- Production companies: Reflection Films; Quiapost Productions
- Distributed by: Reflection Films
- Release date: October 22, 2015
- Running time: 96 minutes
- Countries: Philippines; Australia
- Languages: Filipino; English

The Last Pinoy Action King is a 2015 Philippine documentary film directed by Andrew Leavold and Daniel Palisa. The film focuses on the life of Rudy Fernandez, as well as the Philippine action film industry. It was first released on October 22, 2015, as part of the annual QCinema International Film Festival.

== Interviewees ==
- Rudy Fernandez
- Gina Alajar
- Nora Aunor
- Amy Austria
- Cecille Baun
- Vicky Belo
- Jose N. Carreon
- Gabby Concepcion
- Rez Cortez
- Tirso Cruz III
- Sharon Cuneta
- Dingdong Dantes
- Ricky Davao
- Domy De Guzman
- Christopher de Leon
- Lav Diaz
- Sunshine Dizon
- Gabby Eigenmann
- Jinggoy Estrada
- Mark Anthony Fernandez
- Merle Fernandez
- Rap Fernandez
- Renz Fernandez
- Mario Hernando
- Winnie Hollis-Reyes
- Jose F. Lacaba
- Ronnie Lazaro
- Marichu Maceda
- Edu Manzano
- Baldo Marro
- Leo Martinez
- Robert Miller
- Lily Y. Monteverde
- Bibeth Orteza
- Gene Padilla
- Joey Padilla
- Robin Padilla
- George Paje
- Conrado Peru
- Ramon "Bong" Revilla Jr.
- Efren Reyes Jr.
- Chanda Romero
- Gloria Romero
- Phillip Salvador
- Lolit Solis
- Ali Sotto
- Henry Strzalkowski
- Lorna Tolentino
- Edgardo "Boy" Vinarao
