= Emilio García =

Emilio García may refer to:

- Emilio García Gómez (1905–1995), Spanish Arabist, literary historian and critic
- Emilio García Riera (1931–2002), Spanish-Mexican actor, writer and cinema critic
- Emilio Garcia (actor) actor in Filipino film and TV productions such as Sugo, Mundo man ay magunaw and Reputasyon
- Emilio García (rower) (born 1938), Spanish athlete who competed in rowing at the 1960 Summer Olympics
- Emilio García (footballer) (born 1994), Mexican footballer
- Emilio Garcia (artist) (born 1981), Spanish sculptor and painter
