= Vicki Belo =

Filipino dermatologist and television personality (born 1970)

- Born: January 25, 1956 (age 70) (Note: There is conflicting information of Vicki Belo's birth year. While most sources report it at 1956 in Cebu.; Her own website claims she was born on 1957, while Lifestyle.inq noted reports Belo was born in 1953 and 1955.); Cebu, Philippines
- Education: University of the Philippines Diliman (BS); University of Santo Tomas (MD)
- Occupations: Doctor and businesswoman
- Spouse(s): Atom Henares (annulled); Hayden Kho (m. 2017)
- Children: 3 (2 with Henares; 1 with Kho)
- Parent(s): Enrique Belo (adoptive father)

Maria Victoria "Vicki" Gonzalez Belo-Kho (born January 25, 1956) is a Filipino aesthetic dermatologist, media personality, entrepreneur, and philanthropist. She is the founder, chairwoman of the board, and founding medical advisor of Belo Medical Group.

== Early life and education ==
Maria Victoria "Vicki" Gonzales Belo was born on January 25, 1957 in Cebu. Vicki Belo was the fifth of nine children of Conchita Singson Gonzalez and Agustin Cancio.

Vicki Belo was adopted at two weeks old to Conshita's sister Florencia who is married to Enrique Belo. She was reportedly bullied in childhood for being adopted and obese.

She began paying attention to her fitness at age 11 and began playing pelota and attended gym to lose weight. Her adoptive father, Enrique also intensively availed the services of dermatologist for Vicki. Her experiences in being bullied motivated her to take up a career in the beauty industry later in adulthood.

Belo earned a degree in psychology from the University of the Philippines Diliman in 1978 and subsequently obtained a doctor of medicine degree from the University of Santo Tomas in 1985. She later obtained a dermatology diploma from the Institute of Dermatology in Bangkok, Thailand in 1990. It was in Thailand where Belo learned of laser surgeries realizing she could specialize on the technique rather than dealing with common fungal infections. She was also introduced to dermatological liposuction which does not involve blood.

She also had dermatologic and laser surgery training at the Scripps Clinics in San Diego, California, Harvard Medical School in Boston, and at the St. Francis Memorial Hospital in the University of California, San Francisco.

== Career ==
Belo began her medical practice by opening a dermatology clinic in 1990 at the Medical Towers in Makati. She offered services in laser surgeries and the liposuction technique she learned from her training in Thailand. The clinic later grew to the Belo Medical Group, with Belo being the company's founder, president, and medical director.

Belo's aggressive marketing of her business was seen as some as unethical by medical community but Belo reasons that the services she offered are elective.

Belo attributes two actresses to the rise of her business' popularity in the 2000s. Regine Velasquez and Rosanna Roces. Belo treated Velasquez's bacne using glycolic acid. Velasquez was a referral of her then brother-in-law. The actress later thanked Belo publicly on national television. The second actress, Roces flaunted the result of her liposuction from Belo.

The Belo Medical Group introduced HydraFacial treatment in the Philippines in February 2008. It also offers botox treatment and dermal fillers.

Belo holds the role of CEO and medical director of the Belo Medical Group. The company has been a partner with the Department of Tourism (DOT) to help promote medical tourism in the Philippines.

In July 2024, the Court of Appeals' Special Fourth Division issued a 35‐page decision holding that the Belo Medical Group was guilty of constructive dismissal and directing the company to pay a former employee, ₱3 million in back wages.

== Personal life ==
Belo was married to businessman Atom Henares. They had two children; a son and a daughter. The couple later ended their marriage. In February 2018, Belo attended the outdoor Tagaytay wedding of Henares and Swiss national Nathalie Küpfer.

She married Hayden Kho in Paris in 2017. The couple have a daughter who was born in 2015.

During the COVID-19 pandemic in the early 2020s, Belo started being involved in TikTok and YouTube. She initially produced content in fashion and dance but stopped as it conflicted with her public persona as a doctor. She later transitioned to making content related to dermatology and cosmetic surgery in TikTok, garnering 1.4 million followers by 2021.

== Awards and recognition ==
- 2010 – Reader's Digest Asia Most Trusted Brands of 2010 and Platinum Award Beauty Clinic category.
- 2016 – Black Diamond Award for the Belo Group's Thermage and Fraxel laser procedures.
- 2022 – Global Health & Pharma's Healthcare & Pharmaceutical Awards Beauty Industry Pioneer of the Year Award 2021.
- 2022 – Diamond Award at The Future of Aesthetics by Allergan Aesthetics.

== Filmography ==
- Boy Pick-Up: The Movie (2012)
- Sosy Problems (2012)
- Kung Fu Divas (2013)
- Beauty in a Bottle (2014) as herself
- The Last Pinoy Action King (2015)
- Belo Beauty 101 (2008–2009)
