= Fernando Amorsolo =

Filipino painter

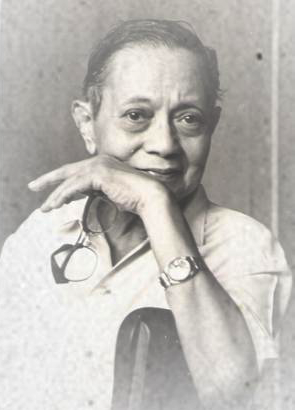
- Amorsolo in 1969
- Born: Fernando Amorsolo y Cueto; May 30, 1892; Paco, Manila, Captaincy General of the Philippines, Spanish Empire
- Died: April 24, 1972 (aged 79); Quezon City, Philippines
- Resting place: Loyola Memorial Park, Marikina, Philippines
- Education: University of the Philippines
- Known for: Painting
- Spouse: Salud Tolentino Jorge (m. 1916; died 1931) Maria del Carmen (m. 1935)
- Awards: Order of National Artists of the Philippines

Fernando Amorsolo y Cueto (May 30, 1892 – April 24, 1972) was a portraitist and painter of rural Philippine landscapes. Nicknamed the "Grand Old Man of Philippine Art," he was the first-ever to be recognized as a National Artist of the Philippines. He was recognized as such for his "pioneering use of impressionistic technique" as well as his skill in the use of lighting and backlighting in his paintings, "significant not only in the development of Philippine art but also in the formation of Filipino notions of self and identity."

== Early life and education ==
Fernando Amorsolo was born on May 30, 1892, in Manila His parents were Pedro Amorsolo and Bonifacia Cueto. His father quickly found work in Daet, Camarines Norte months after Fernando's birth, and the family lived there until his father died when Amorsolo was 11. While he studied in a public school in Daet, his parents taught him to read and write Spanish at home.

After his father's death, the family moved back to Manila, where they stayed with one of his uncles, Don Fabián de la Rosa, his mother's cousin, who was also a Filipino painter. At the age of 13, Amorsolo became an apprentice to De la Rosa, who would eventually become the advocate and guide to Amorsolo's painting career. During this time, Amorsolo's mother did embroidery to earn money, while Amorsolo helped by selling water color postcards to a local bookstore for 10 centavos each. His younger brother, Pablo Amorsolo, also became a painter.

Amorsolo's first success as a young painter came in 1908, when his painting Leyendo el periódico took second place at the Bazar Escolta, a contest organized by the Asociacion Internacional de Artistas. Between 1909 and 1914, he enrolled at the Art School of the Liceo de Manila. His most notable work as a student at the Liceo was his painting of a young man and a young woman in a garden, which won him the first prize in the art school exhibition during his graduation year.

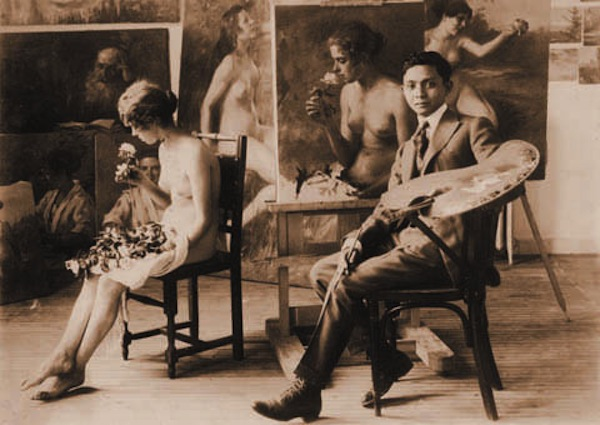
Young Fernando Amorsolo in 1917

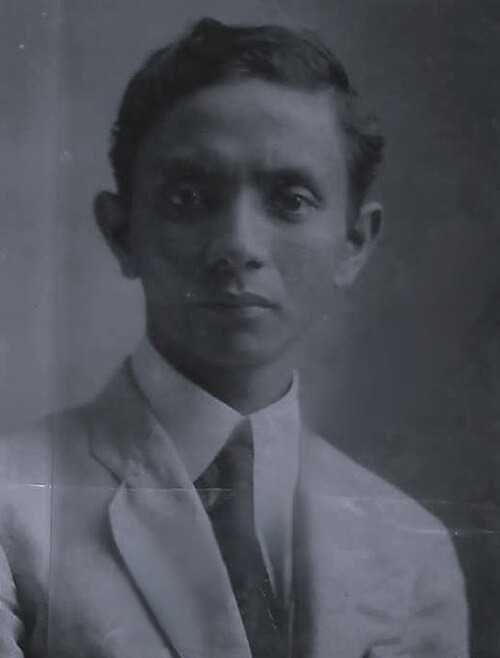
Amorsolo on his U.S. passport application in 1919

After graduating from the Liceo, he entered the University of the Philippines' School of Fine Arts, where De la Cruz taught at that time. During college, Fernando Amorsolo's primary influences were the spanish court painter Diego Velázquez, John Singer Sargent, Anders Zorn, Claude Monet, Pierre-Auguste Renoir, but mostly his contemporary Spanish masters Joaquín Sorolla Bastida and Ignacio Zuloaga. To make money during school, Amorsolo joined competitions and did illustrations for various Philippine publications, including Severino Reyes’ first novel in Tagalog language, Parusa ng Diyos ("Punishment of God"), Iñigo Ed. Regalado's Madaling Araw ("Dawn"), as well as illustrations for editions of the Pasyon. Amorsolo graduated with medals from the University of the Philippines in 1914.

== Career ==
Antipolo by Fernando Amorsolo, depicting Filipinos celebrating the annual pilgrimage to Antipolo, with the pre-War cathedral depicted in the background.

After graduating from the University of the Philippines, Amorsolo worked as a draftsman for the Bureau of Public Works as a chief artist at the Pacific Commercial Company and as a part-time instructor at the University of the Philippines. He taught at the University for 38 years, including 14 years as director of the Art Department.

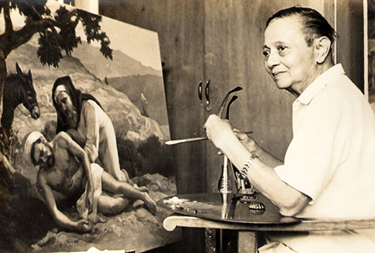
Amorsolo in his studio

After three years as an instructor and commercial artist, Amorsolo was given a grant to study at the Academia de San Fernando in Madrid, Spain by Filipino businessman Enrique Zóbel de Ayala. During his seven months in Spain, Amorsolo sketched at museums and along the streets of Madrid experimenting with the use of light and color. Still through the Zóbel grant, Amorsolo was also able to travel to New York City, where he encountered postwar impressionism and cubism which would become major influences on his work.

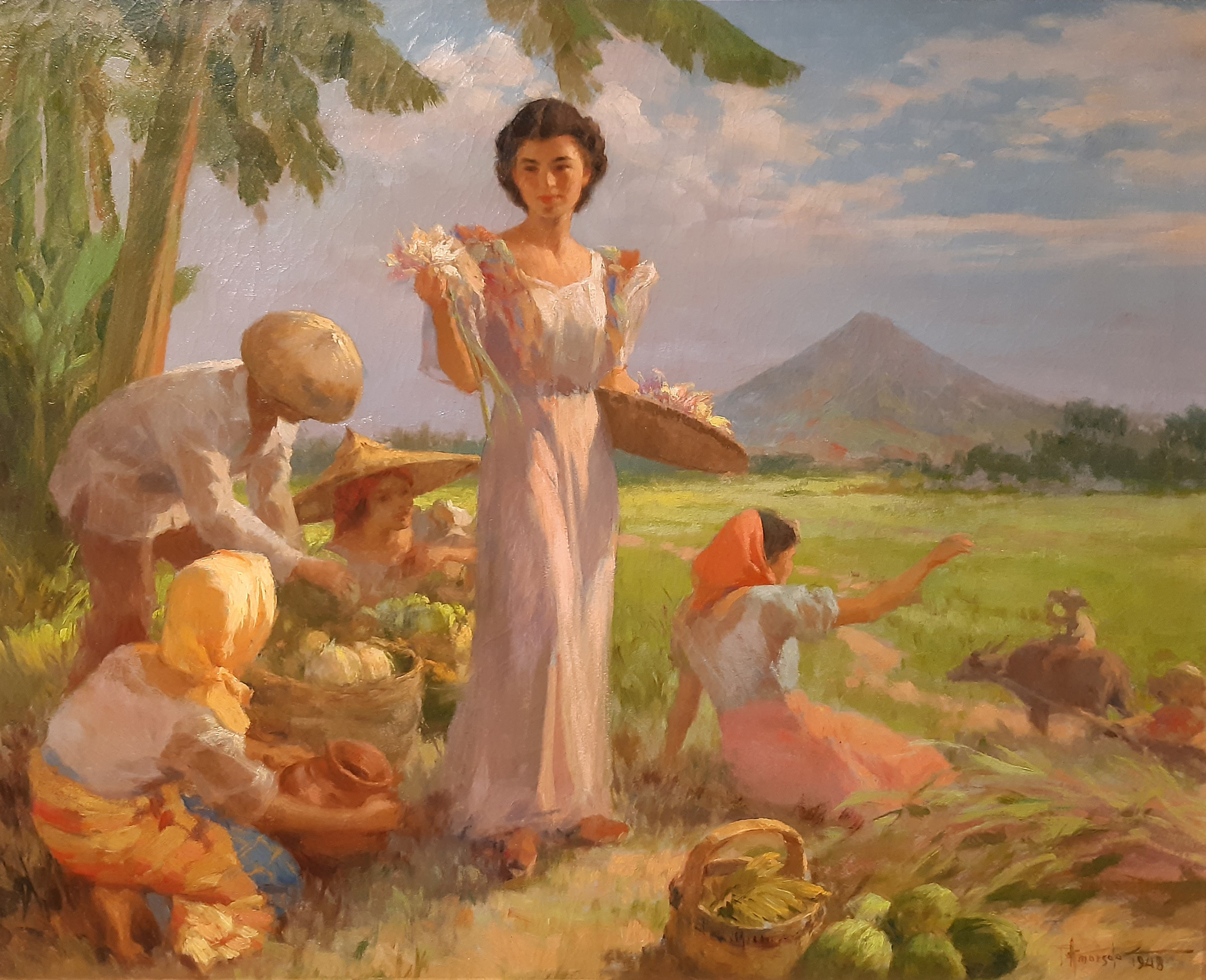
Portrait of Victoria Zobel de Ayala in the farm.

Amorsolo set up his own studio upon his return to Manila and painted during the 1920s and the 1930s. His Rice Planting (1922), which appeared on posters and tourist brochures became one of the most popular images of the Commonwealth of the Philippines. Beginning in the 1930s, Amorsolo's work was exhibited widely in the Philippines and abroad.

Amorsolo was sought after by influential Filipinos including Luis Araneta, Antonio Araneta and Jorge B. Vargas. Due to his popularity, Amorsolo had to resort to photographing his works, sticking and mounting them in an album allowing patrons to choose from this catalog of his work. Amorsolo avoided creating exact replicas of his trademark themes by recreating the paintings by varying some elements.

His works later appeared on the cover and pages of children textbooks, in novels, in commercial designs, in cartoons and illustrations for Philippine publications such The Independent, Philippine Magazine, Telembang, El Renacimiento Filipino, and Excelsior. He served as the director of the University of the Philippine's College of Fine Arts from 1938 to 1952.

During the 1950s until his death in 1972, Amorsolo averaged finishing 10 paintings a month. However, during his later years, diabetes, cataracts, arthritis, headaches, dizziness and the death of two of his sons affected the execution of his works. Amorsolo underwent a cataract operation when he was 70 years old, a surgery that did not impede him from drawing and painting.

Amorsolo was a close friend of the Philippine sculptor Guillermo Tolentino, the creator of Filipino patriot Andrés Bonifacio's monument in Caloocan.

== Style and techniques ==
Sketch of a woman, whose unfinished style is representative of Amorsolo's sketching

=== Women and landscapes ===
Amorsolo, acclaimed as “Painter of Philippine Sunlight,” is best known for his illuminated landscapes, which often portrayed traditional Filipino customs, culture, fiestas and occupations. His pastoral works presented "an imagined sense of nationhood in counterpoint to American colonial rule" and were important to the formation of Filipino national identity. He was educated in the Classical tradition and aimed "to achieve his Philippine version of the Greek ideal for the human form." In his paintings of Filipina women, Amorsolo rejected Western ideals of beauty in favor of Filipino ideals and was fond of basing the faces of his subjects on members of his family.

"[The women I paint should have] a rounded face, not of the oval type often presented to us in newspapers and magazine illustrations. The eyes should be exceptionally lively, not the dreamy, sleepy type that characterizes the Mongolian. The nose should be of the blunt form but firm and strongly marked. ... So the ideal Filipina beauty should not necessarily be white complexioned, nor of the dark brown color of the typical Malayan, but of the clear skin or fresh colored type which we often witness when we met a blushing girl."

— Fernando Amorsolo

Amorsolo used natural light in his paintings and developed the backlighting technique, Chiaroscuro, which became his artistic trademark and his greatest contribution to Philippine painting. In a typical Amorsolo painting, figures are outlined against a characteristic glow, and intense light on one part of the canvas highlights nearby details. Philippine sunlight was a constant feature of Amorsolo's work; he is believed to have painted a rainy-day scene only once.

In 2018, the National Museum of the Philippines officially identified Amorsolo's last known painting of an unfinished creative work of the late Florencia "Nena" Singson Gonzalez-Belo (September 29, 1927-May 11, 2016), wife of Enrique Belo and mother of Vicki Belo. It was donated by Amorsolo's widow, Maria del Carmen Amorsolo as confirmed in 2016 by Judy Araneta Roxas. Vicki Bello further affirmed that her mother's 5 sisters had Amorsolo paintings. The painting stood at the National Museum of the Philippines' Gallery VI since 2015.

=== Sketches ===
Amorsolo was an incessant sketch artist, often drawing sketches at his home, at Luneta Park, and in the countryside. He drew the people he saw around him, from farmers to city-dwellers coping with the Japanese occupation. Amorsolo's impressionistic tendencies, which may be seen in his paintings as well, were at their height in his sketches. His figures were not completely finished but were mere "suggestions" of the image.

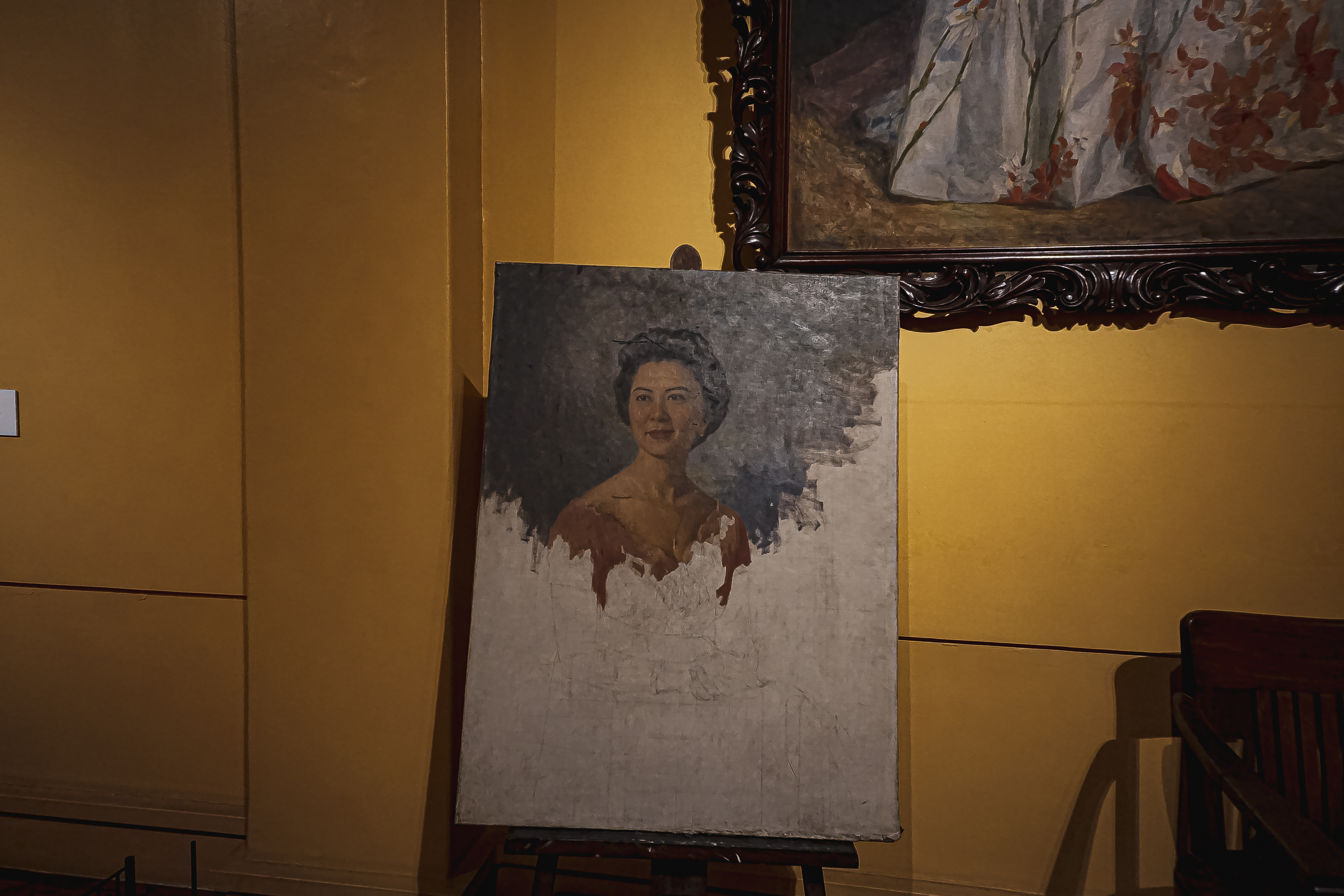
Sketch of Florencia "Nena" Singson Gonzalez-Belo, wife of Enrique Belo, mother of Vicki Belo, whose unfinished style is representative of Amorsolo's sketching

=== Historical paintings and portraits ===
Amorsolo also painted a series of historical paintings on pre-Colonial and Spanish Colonization events. Amorsolo's Making of the Philippine Flag, in particular, was widely reproduced. His The First Baptism in the Philippines required numerous detailed sketches and colored studies of its elements. These diverse elements were meticulously and carefully set by the artist before being transferred to the final canvas. For his pre-colonial and 16th-century depiction of the Philippines, Amorsolo referred to the written accounts of Antonio Pigafetta, other available reading materials, and visual sources. He consulted with the Philippine scholars of the time, H. Pardo de Tavera and Epifanio de los Santos. His work on historical periods, especially his most famous work in popular culture, Confeccion de la Standarte Nacionale or Making of the Philippine Flag in 1955, has been frequently reproduced in commercial goods and has become a mainstay in Filipino popular culture.

Amorsolo also painted oil portraits of Presidents like General Emilio Aguinaldo, Manuel L. Quezon, and Elpidio Quirino, and other prominent individuals such as Don Alfredo Jacób and Doña Pura Garchitorena Toral of Camarines Sur. He also painted the wedding picture of Don Mariano Garchitorena and Doña Caridad Pamintuan of Pampanga.

He also did a portrait of American Senator Warren Grant Magnuson (1905–1989), of the Democratic Party from Washington, whom the Warren G. Magnuson Health Sciences Building at the University of Washington, and the Warren G. Magnuson Clinical Center at the National Institutes of Health in Bethesda, Maryland are named after.

Detail from Fernando Amorsolo's 1945 Defence of a Filipina Woman's Honour, which is representative of Amorsolo's World War II-era paintings. Here, a Filipino man defends a woman, who is either his wife or daughter, from being raped by an unseen Japanese soldier. Note the Japanese military cap at the man's foot

=== World War II-era works ===
After the onset of World War II, Amorsolo's typical pastoral scenes were replaced by the depictions of a war-torn nation. During the Japanese occupation of the Philippines during World War II, Amorsolo spent his days at his home near the Japanese garrison, where he sketched war scenes from the house's windows or rooftop.

During the war, he documented the destruction of many landmarks in Manila and the pain, tragedy and death experienced by Filipino people, with his subjects including "women mourning their dead husbands, files of people with pushcarts and makeshift bags leaving a dark burning city tinged with red from fire and blood." Amorsolo frequently portrayed the lives and suffering of Filipina women during World War II. Other World War II-era paintings by Amorsolo include a portrait in absentia of General Douglas MacArthur as well as self-portraits and paintings of Japanese occupation soldiers. In 1948, Amorsolo's wartime paintings were exhibited at the Malacañang Palace.

== Critical evaluation ==
Amorsolo's supporters consider his portrayals of the countryside as "the true reflections of the Filipino Soul."

Amorsolo has been accused, however, of succumbing to commercialism and merely producing souvenir paintings for American soldiers. Critic Francisco Arcellana wrote in 1948 that Amorsolo's paintings "have nothing to say" and that they were not hard to understand because "there is nothing to understand." Critics have criticized Amorsolo's portraits of Philippine Commonwealth personalities, his large, mid-career anecdotal works, and his large historical paintings. Of the latter, critics have said that his "artistic temperament was simply not suited to generating the sense of dramatic tension necessary for such works."

Another critic, however, while noting that most of Amorsolo's estimated ten thousand works were underwhelming, considering his talent, argues that Amorsolo's oeuvre should nonetheless be judged by his best works instead of his worst. Amorsolo's small landscapes, especially those of his early career, have been judged as his best works, "hold[ing] well together plastic-ally." Amorsolo may "be considered a master of the Philippine landscape as landscape, even outranking Luna and Hidalgo who also did some Philippine landscapes of the same dimensions."

== Death ==
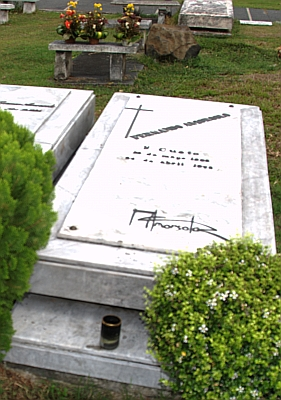
Amorsolo's grave in Loyola Memorial Park, Marikina until restoration

After being confined at the St. Luke's Hospital in Quezon City for about two months, Amorsolo died of heart failure at the age of 79 on April 24, 1972.

== Legacy ==
Four days after his death, Amorsolo was posthumously honored as the first National Artist of the Philippines at the Cultural Center of the Philippines.

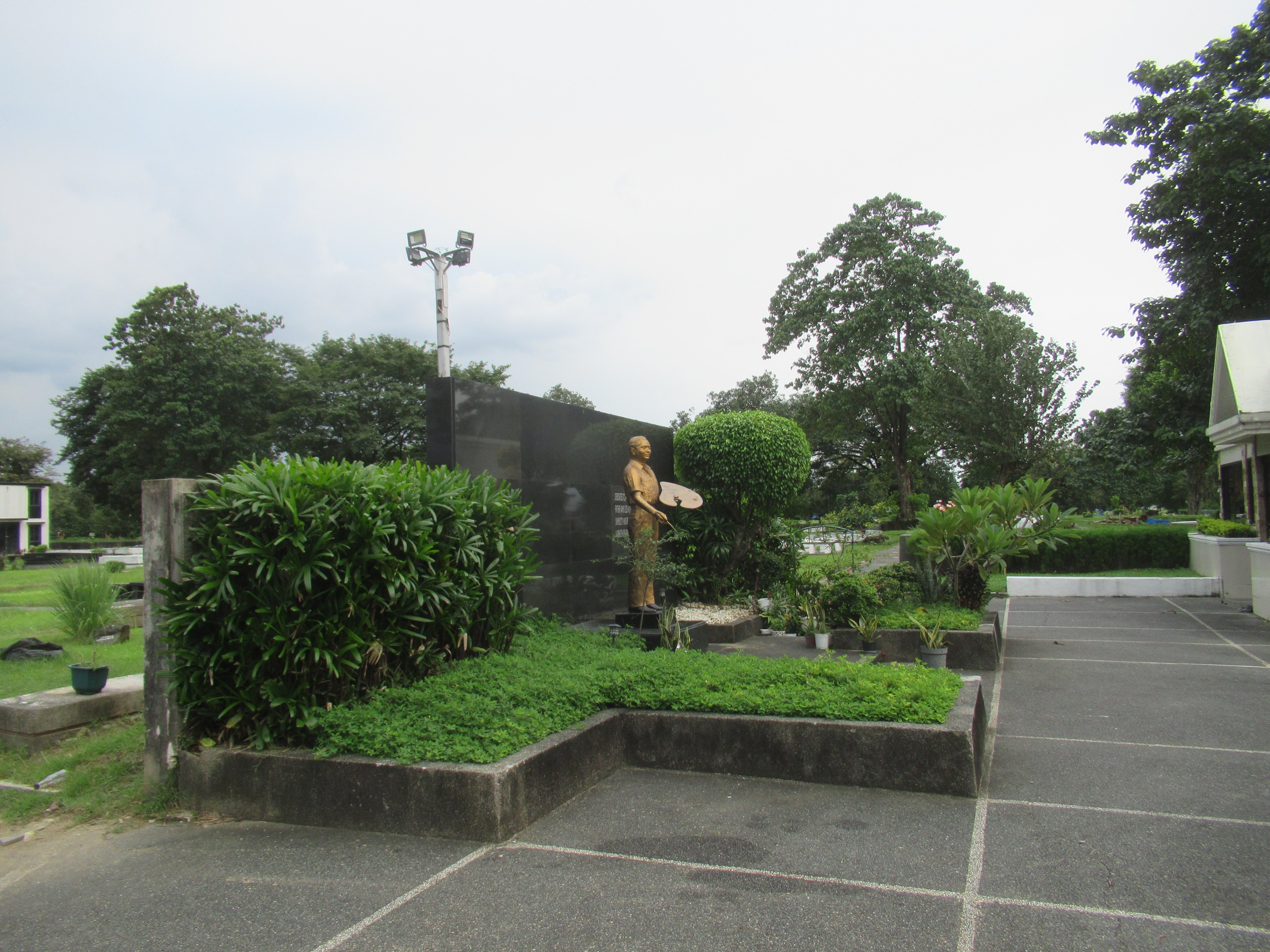
Amorsolo grave-statue in 2023

The volume of paintings, sketches, and studies of Amorsolo is believed to have reached more than 10,000 pieces. Amorsolo was an important influence on contemporary Filipino art and artists, even beyond the so-called "Amorsolo school." Amorsolo's influence can be seen in many landscape paintings by Filipino artists, including early landscape paintings by abstract painter Federico Aguilar Alcuaz.

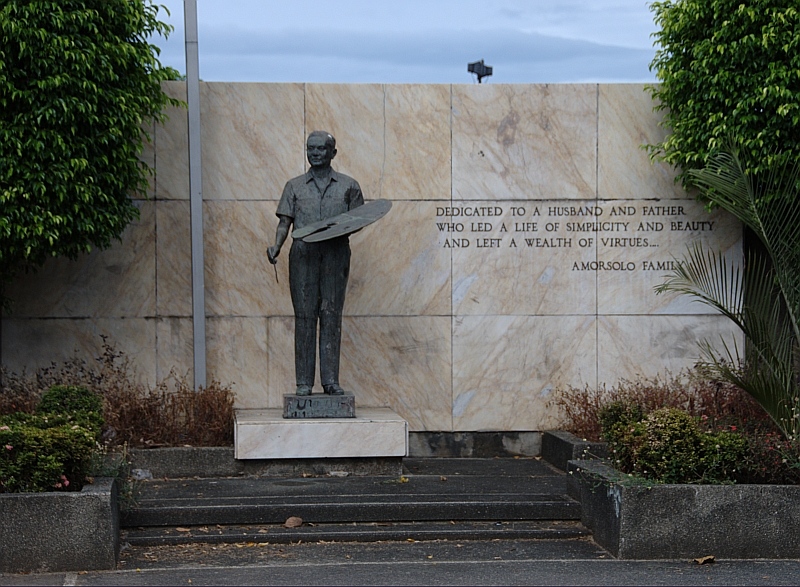
Amorsolo statue

In 2003, Amorsolo's children founded the Fernando C. Amorsolo Art Foundation, which is dedicated to preserving Fernando Amorsolo's legacy, promoting his style and vision, and preserving a national heritage through the conservation and promotion of his works.

=== Auction records ===
Since the 2000s, works by Amorsolo have achieved record prices at auction with the growth of the Philippine art market. On April 28, 2002, an early work from 1915 called Portrait of Fernanda de Jesus sold for a record price of PHP19.136 million (US$376,177) at a Christie's auction in Hong Kong. This record on May 30, 2010, was later broken as a work from 1923 Lavanderas previously held by an American-based collector sold for PHP20.83 million (US$434,067) also at a Christie's auction in Hong Kong.

By the 2010s, the prominence of local auction houses in the country has substantially increased the value of Amorsolo's works with the constant repatriation of Philippine art. On June 9, 2018, a 1931 work called the Mango Gatherers better known as the Conde de Peracamps Amorsolo as it was previously in the collection of Antonio Méilan Zóbel, the 4th Count of Peracamps, was sold at a Leon Gallery auction in Manila for a then-world record price of PHP46.720 million (US$883,883).

In its wake, other works by Amorsolo have surpassed the PHP20 million mark including a 1946 genre work by Amorsolo titled Cooking under the Mango Tree previously in the collection of the Compañía General de Tabacos de Filipinas (Tabacalera) was sold at another Leon Gallery auction in Manila for a record PHP 23.360 million on February 23, 2019. More recently, a 1949 genre work called Planting Rice reached PHP 30.368 million at a Salcedo Auctions sale on March 13, 2021, presently the world record price for a post-war work by the artist.

On 14 September 2024, Amorsolo's 1929 work Under the Mango Tree that previously was in the collection of American industrialist Edward J. Nell was sold at a record price of PHP 57.676 million at Leon Gallery in Manila, thus becoming the world record price for the artist.

=== Museums ===
The Jorge B. Vargas Museum and Filipiniana Research Center in Manila displays a major collection of Amorsolo's work.

== Major works ==
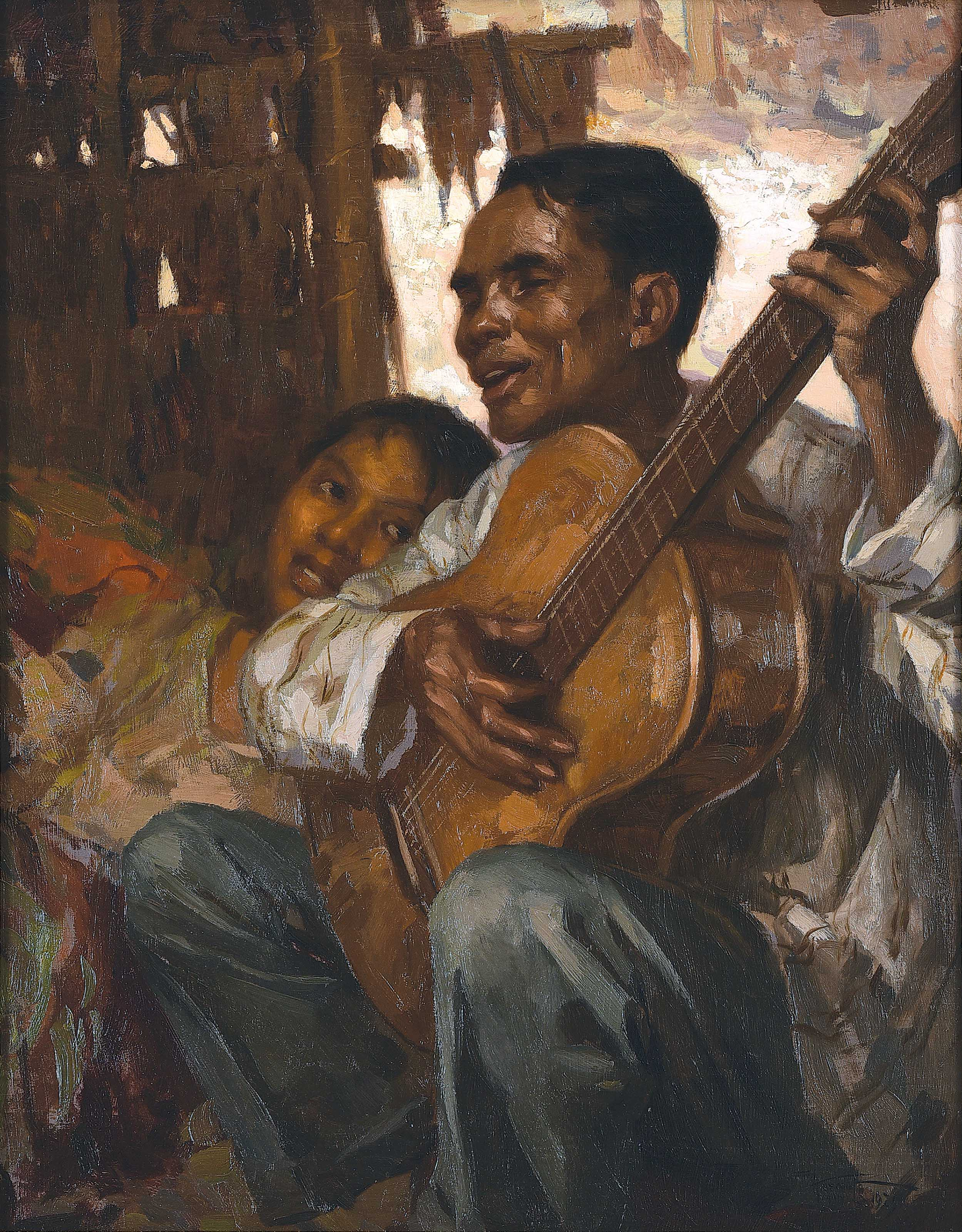
El Ciego, 1928

Major works by Amorsolo include:

- Babaeng Nagbabasa
- Afternoon Meal of the Workers (Noonday Meal of the Rice Workers) (1939)
- Assassination of Governor Bustamante
- Bataan
- The Bombing of the Intendencia (1942)
- The Building of Intramuros
- Burning of the Idol
- The Burning of Manila (1946)
- El Ciego (1928)
- Confeccion de la Standarte Nacionale (Making of the Philippine Flag) (1955)
- The Conversion of the Filipinos (1931)
- Corner of Hell
- Dalagang Bukid (1936)
- Defense of a Filipina Woman's Honor (1945)
- La destruccion de Manila por los salvajes japoneses (The Destruction of Manila by the Savage Japanese)
- Early Filipino State Wedding
- Early Sulu Wedding (c. 1955–1960)
- The Explosion (1944)
- The First Baptism in the Philippines (1949)
- The First Mass in the Philippines
- Fruit Gatherer (1950)
- Fruit Pickers Harvesting Under the Mango Tree (1939)
- Maiden in a Stream (1921)
- Marca Demonio/St. Michael the Archangel (1917)
- The Mestiza (1943)
- My Wife, Salud (1920; lost in World War II)
- One Casualty
- Our Lady of Light (1950)
- Planting Rice / Rice Planting (Multiple versions: 1921 (first version), 1922, 1946, 1949 with Mayon, 1951)
- Princess Urduja
- The Rape of Manila (1942)
- Sale of Panay
- Sikatuna
- Sunday Morning Going to Town (1958)
- US Senator Warren Magnuson Oil Portrait (1958)
- Traders
- El violinista (The Violinist)
- Sunrise (1958)

== Awards and achievements ==
- 1908 – 2nd Prize, Bazar Escolta (Asocacion Internacional de Artistas), for Levendo Periodico
- 1922 – 1st Prize, Commercial and Industrial Fair in the Manila Carnival
- 1939 – 1st Prize, New York World’s Fair, for Afternoon Meal of Rice Workers (also known as Noonday Meal of the Rice Workers)
- 1940 – Outstanding University of the Philippines Alumnus Award
- 1959 – Gold Medal, UNESCO National Commission
- 1961 – Rizal Pro Patria Award
- 1961 – Honorary Doctorate in the Humanities, from the Far Eastern University
- 1963 – Diploma of Merit from the University of the Philippines
- 1963 – Patnubay ng Sining at Kalinangan Award, from the City of Manila
- 1963 – Republic Cultural Heritage Award
- 1972 – Gawad CCP para sa Sining, from the Cultural Center of the Philippines

In 1972, Fernando Amorsolo became the first Filipino to be distinguished as the Philippine's National Artist in Painting. He was named as the "Grand Old Man of Philippine Art" during the inauguration of the Manila Hilton's art center, where his paintings were exhibited on January 23, 1969.

=== Major exhibitions ===
Outside the Philippines, his exhibitions were held in Belgium, at the Exposicion de Panama in 1914, at a one-man show at the Grand Central Art Galleries in New York City in 1925, and at the National Museum on November 6, 1948. During the 1931 Paris Exposition, Amorsolo exhibited one of his anecdotal paintings, The Conversion of the Filipinos. Amorsolo's entries at the Exposicion in Panama were a portrait of U.S. President Woodrow Wilson and the piece La Muerte de Socrates. In 1948 an Amorsolo exhibit was sponsored by the Art Association of the Philippines in the National Museum. In 1950, Amorsolo exhibited two more historical paintings, Faith Among the Ruins and Baptism of Rajah Humabon at the Missionary Art Exhibit in Rome. In 1979, Fernando Amorsolo's legacy as a painter was celebrated through an exhibition of his works at the Art Center of the Manila Hilton. His art was also featured in a 2007 exhibition in Havana.

== Personal life ==
During his lifetime, Amorsolo had a total of 14 children from two marriages and a common-law-wife. In 1916, he married Salud Tolentino Jorge, with whom he had six children; Salud died in 1931. He then met and lived with common-law wife, Virginia Guevarra Santos, with whom he had three children, namely Manuel (who followed in his father's footstep, with a degree in Fine Arts from the University of the Philippines), Jorge and Norma before he met his would-be second wife, Maria del Carmen. While they were still together, Virginia found an engagement ring in one of Amorsolo's drawers; she knew the ring was for Maria, that prompted her to leave his house with her three children.

In 1935, Fernando married Maria del Carmen who gave him eight more children. Among her daughters with her are Sylvia Amorsolo-Lazo and Luz. But while they were married and Maria was giving birth to his children, Fernando had three more children with Virginia. His reputation was growing as fast as his brood and his work was more than enough to provide for his rather large family. Six of Amorsolo's children became artists themselves. His descendants include Eula Valdez and Paolo Ballesteros.

== See also ==
- Arts of the Philippines
- Ginebra San Miguel
- José Honorato Lozano
- Juan Luna
- Fabián de la Rosa
- Boxer Codex
- Justiniano Asuncion
- Félix Resurrección Hidalgo
