= Fabián de la Rosa =

Filipino painter (1869–1937)

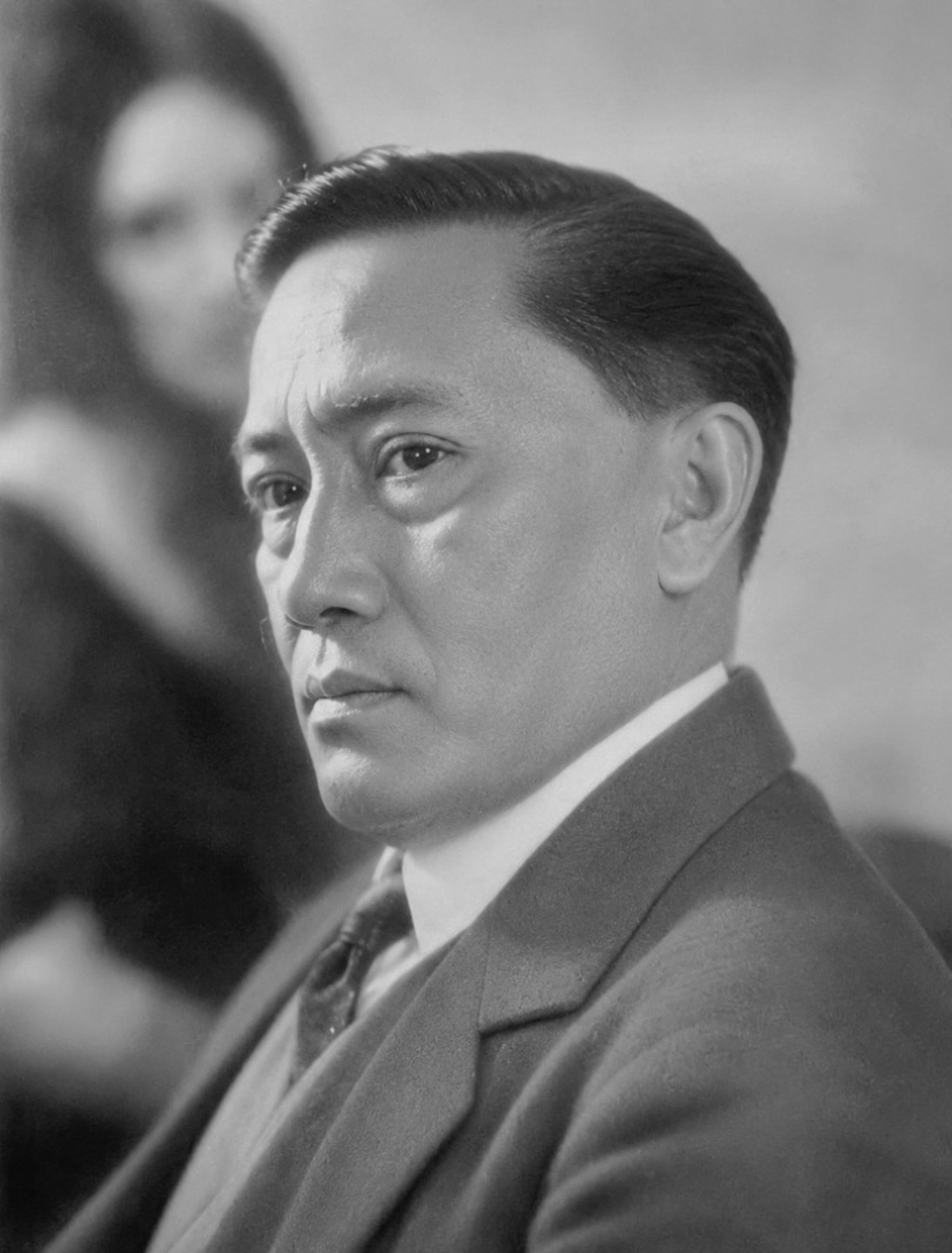
- Born: Fabián de la Rosa y Cueto; May 5, 1869; Paco, Manila, Captaincy General of the Philippines
- Died: December 14, 1937 (aged 68); Quiapo, Manila, Philippine Commonwealth
- Known for: Painting
- Notable work: Women Working in a Rice Field (1902); Transplanting Rice (1904); The Death of General Lawton (1904)
- Movement: Realism
- Spouse: Gorgonia Tolentino

Don Fabián de la Rosa y Cueto (May 5, 1869 – December 14, 1937) was a Filipino painter. He was the uncle and mentor to the Philippines' national artist in painting, Fernando Amorsolo, and to his brother Pablo. He is regarded as a "master of genre" in Philippine art.

== Early life and education ==
Fabián de la Rosa was born in Paco, Manila to husband and wife Marcos de la Rosa and Gorgonia Cueto. Born to a family of artists, he was exposed to art at an early age and learned to draw well before he could write. He was trained to sketch portraits and landscapes by his aunt, Marciana de la Rosa, when he was ten years old. He also apprenticed under his uncle, Simón Flores y de la Rosa, a well-known painter of portraits and church interiors from the nineteenth century. De la Rosa lived most of his life in the Philippines and visited Europe for the first time when he was 39. He married Gorgonia Tolentino on January 13, 1900.

== Career ==
=== Academic Training ===
De la Rosa received formal education at the age of 12 when he enrolled at the Escuela de Artes y Oficios in 1881. Three years into his training de la Rosa's father died, forcing the young painter to drop out of the school in order to help feed his family. It was during this time that he painted his first known masterpiece, La Perla de Lucban. In 1893, he entered the Escuela Superior de Pintura Escultura y Grabado at the age of 24 where he received training from Lorenzo Guerrero and Miguel Zaragoza. In 1898, de la Rosa won a contest for a scholarship to Spanish Art Academy of San Fernando in Madrid. However, the outbreak of the Philippine Revolution meant his dream would not materialize.

Later under the American regime, the Escuela would become one of the three founding units of the University of the Philippines (established in 1908) and renamed the UP School of Fine Arts. In 1908, he traveled to Europe as a pensionado through a scholarship opportunity given by the Germinal Cigar Factory. He attended the Académie Julian in Paris, France.

=== As a professor ===
After traveling from Europe, he became one of the first instructors at the School of Fine Arts at the University of the Philippines, where he introduced to his students the decorated form of painting. De la Rosa became the full director of the school from 1927 to 1937.

=== Exhibition ===
Together with his wife, de la Rosa went back to Europe in 1928, where he painted in Paris for four months. He also traveled to Munich, Germany, Geneva, Switzerland, and Rome. Upon reaching Madrid, Spain, he held an exhibit of his works at the Ateneo de Madrid.

=== Reviews ===
It is believed that de la Rosa was able to paint about 1,000 works. De la Rosa's works were divided by Aurelio S. Alvero into three time periods: those that are academic but are not giving importance to atmosphere and ambience; those that have academic form that gives importance to the environment that could be sensed; and those that play with the use of colors.

== Works ==
- Women Working in a Rice Field, 1921
- Transplanting Rice, 1904
- The Death of General Lawton, 1904
- Un recuerdo de la Villa Borghese (A Remembrance of the Villa Borghese), 1909
- Planting Rice, 109.2 x 190.6 cm, oil on canvas, 1921, Malacañan Palace Collection
- Los Baños, watercolor, 56.2 x 66.4 cm, 1922, UP Vargas Museum
- La pintora (Woman Painter)
- La bordadora (The Embroiderer)
- Landscape with Dark Trees, 1927
- Barcazas en el Rio (Houseboats in a River), oil on canvas, Private Collection, USA
- Pasay Beach, Manila, 1927
- Young Filipina, oil on canvas, 34.2 x 27.9 cm, 1928, Paulino Que Collection
- El kundiman (The Kundiman), 1930
- Riverview of Sta. Ana, 48.2 x 64.5 cm, oil on canvas, 1938, UP Vargas Museum Collection
- Marikina Road, ca. 1939
- View of Santa Ana
- Marikina Valley, oil on canvas, 39.3 x 50 cm, undated, UP Vargas Museum Collection
- El Kabayo 48.2 x 64.5 cm, oil on canvas, 1938, UP Vargas Museum Collection
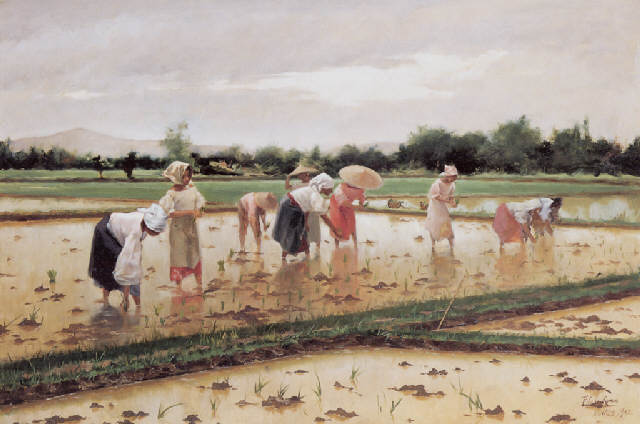
Women working in a rice field. Oil on canvas, 1902.

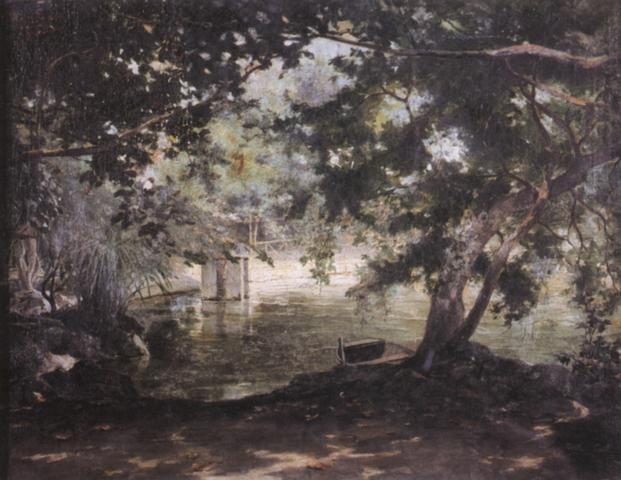
Un recuerdo de la Villa Borghese (A remembrance of the Villa Borghese), 1909.

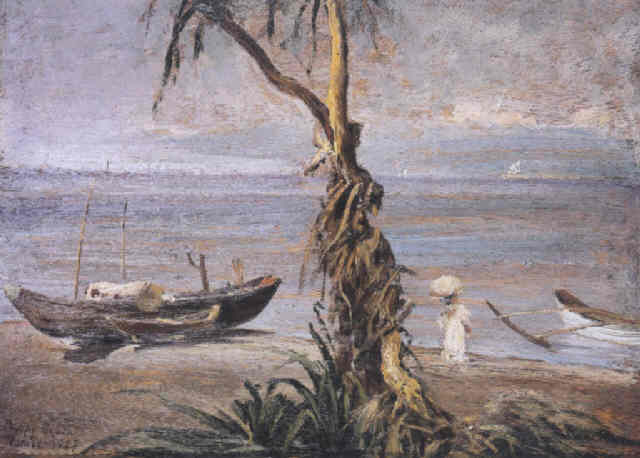
Pasay Beach, 1927

Young Filipina. Oil on canvas, 1928, from the Paulino Que Collection.

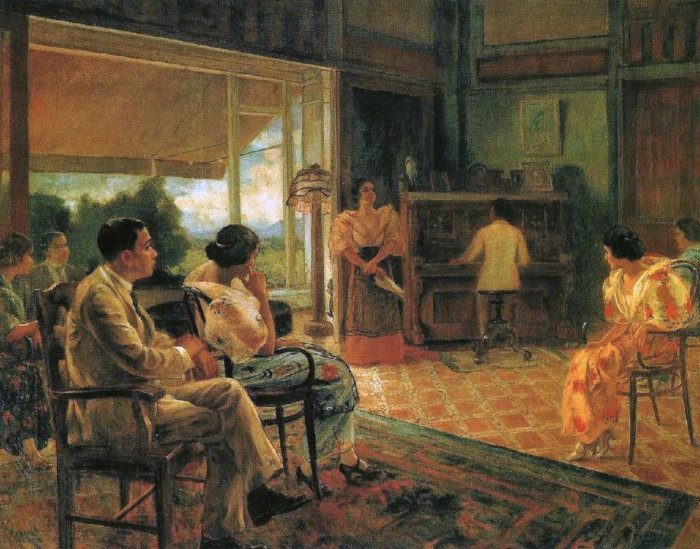
El Kundiman, oil on canvas, 1930

Barcazas en el Rio

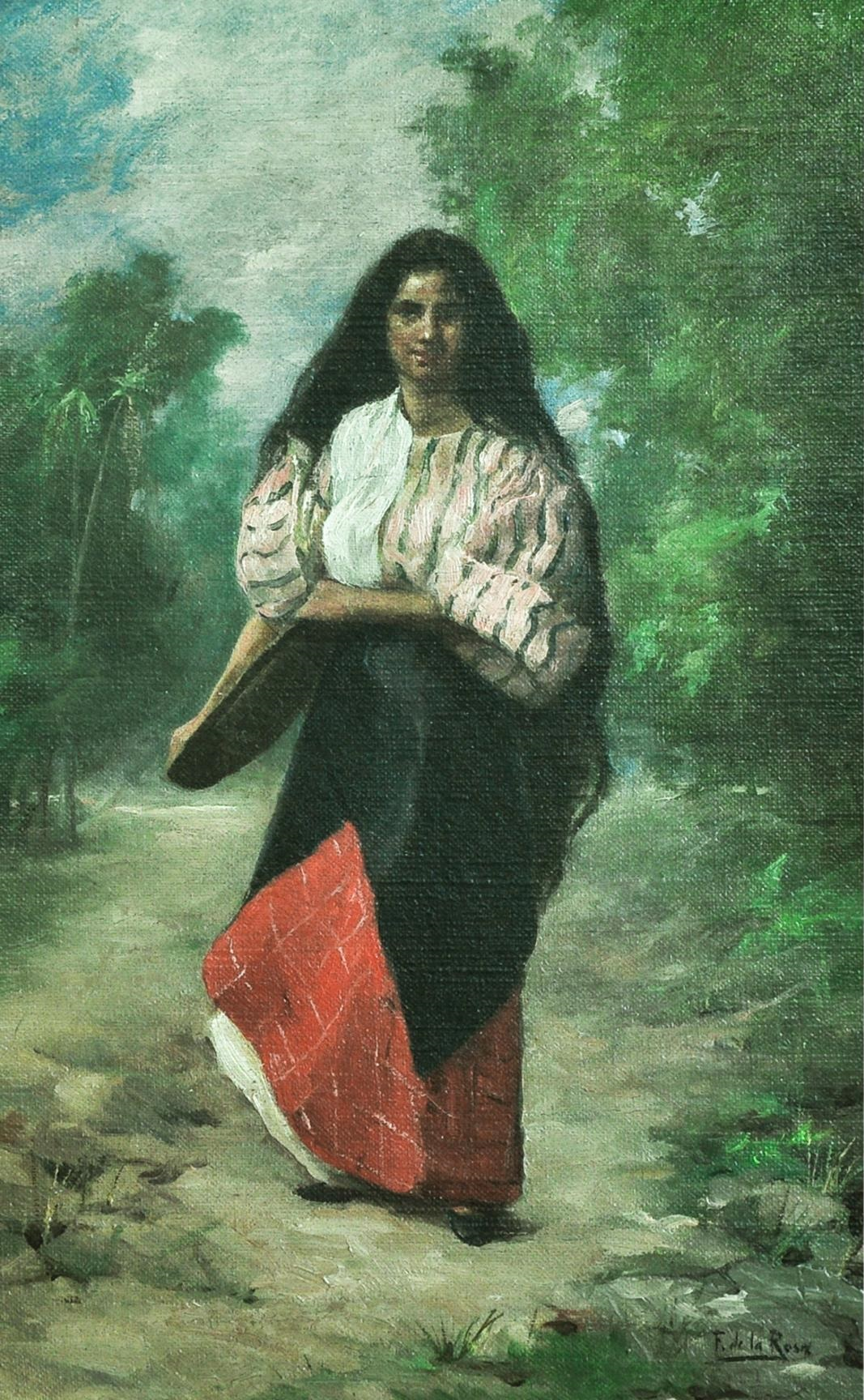
Filipina

== Awards ==
Even after his death, de la Rosa was recognized and was given the Patnubay ng Sining at Kalinangan (Guide of the Arts and Culture) by the City of Manila in 1968.

De la Rosa's Transplanting Rice received the golden award at the International Exposition held in St. Louis, Missouri in 1904. It is also during this exposition when his The Death of General Lawton was awarded the bronze prize.

An exposition about the paintings of de la Rosa was held at the Jorge B. Vargas Museum of the University of the Philippines, in Diliman, Quezon City, on January 14, 2007. The presentation was given the title "Fabian De la Rosa (1869-1938) Retrospective Exhibition," and was managed by the University of the Philippines with the assistance of the Spanish Program for Cultural Cooperation and Filipiniana.net, a part of Vibal Publishing House, Inc.

== See also ==
- Justiniano Asuncion
- José Honorato Lozano
- Damián Domingo
- Fernando Amorsolo
- Juan Luna
- Félix Resurrección Hidalgo
