= Emilio Garcia (artist) =

Spanish artist and entrepreneur (born 1981)

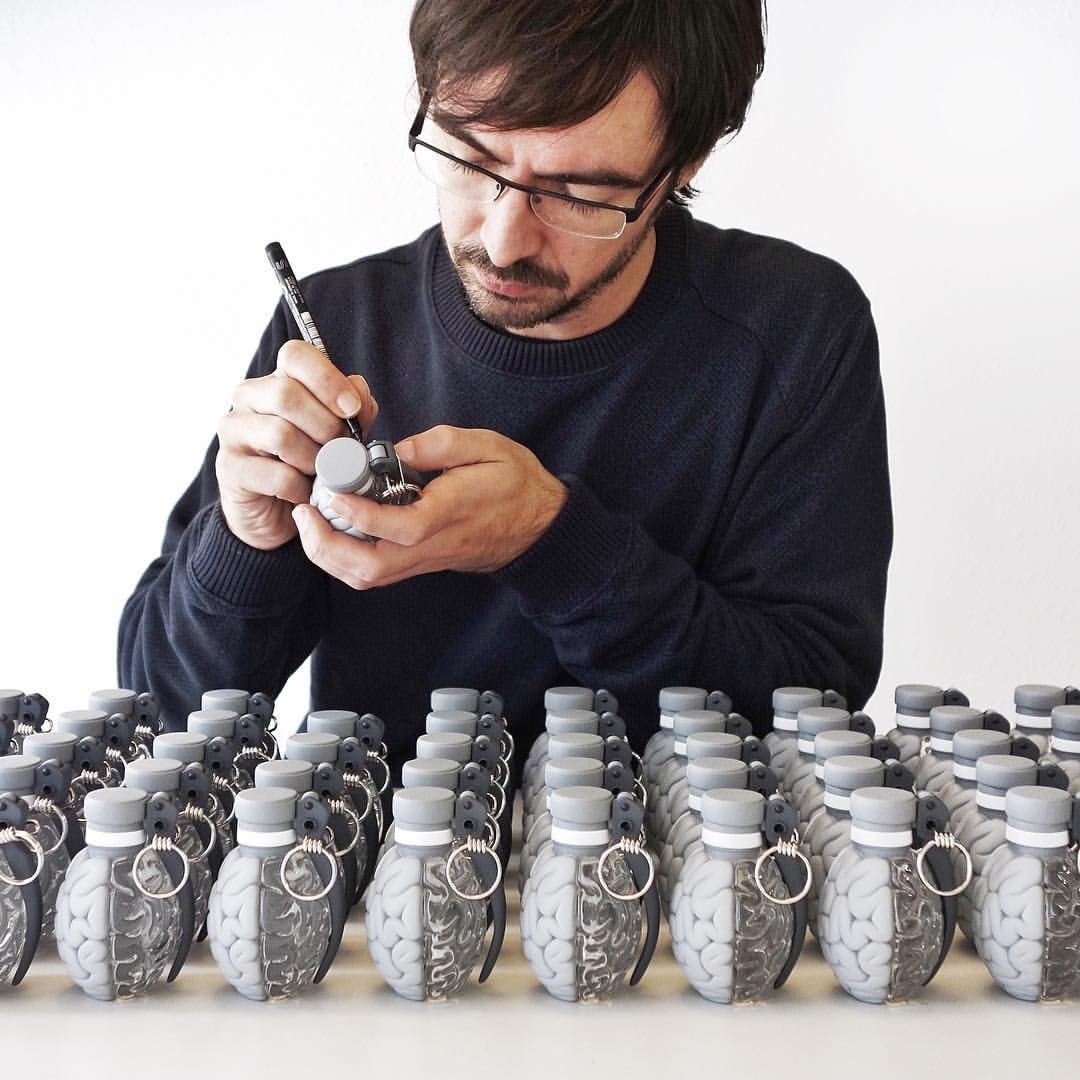
- Emilio Garcia in November 2015
- Born: 22 January 1981 (age 45); Tarragona, Spain
- Education: Escola d'Art i Disseny de Tarragona
- Known for: sculpture, product design, painting
- Notable work: Jumping Brain; Brain Pattern; Skull Brain; Brainade; Brain Heart
- Website: emiliogarcia.org

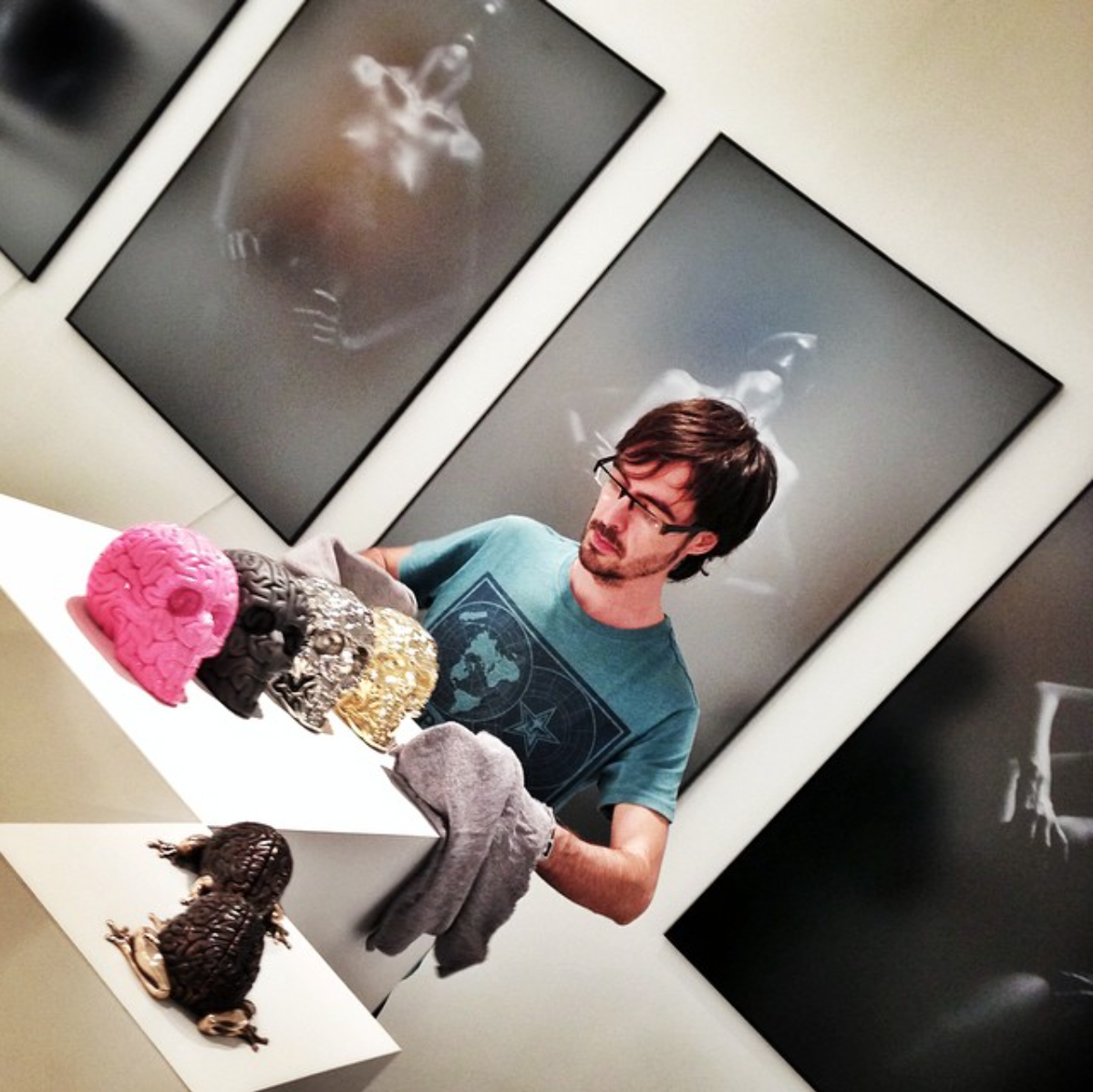
Emilio Garcia at CONTEXT Art Miami 2012

Emilio Garcia (born 22 January 1981 in Tarragona) is a Spanish artist and entrepreneur. He was raised between his home town of El Vendrell as well as in Barcelona. He is most well known for the "Jumping Brain" sculpture.

== Biography ==
Emilio Garcia, known by his brain-related sculptures was born in January 1981 in Tarragona, Spain. Fascinated by the cognitive development and pop culture, Emilio Garcia explores the neuroplasticity of human brain by creating contemporary iconic eye-catching sculptures and paintings in vibrant colors. He graduated from Escola d'Art i Disseny de Tarragona in Graphic Design in 1999, combining study with work at different cartoon animation studios in Barcelona as layout artist and illustrator...

Since 1999 he has worked as freelance art director for international major companies like Berlitz Corporation, Hitachi, Diesel, Inditex, Metro, Vans or The North Face specializing in user interface design and interactive content. His work is published in several "Web Design Index" books by Pepin Press & Agile Rabbit (2002–08) and "Taschen's 1000 Favorite Websites" (2003) among others.

Concerned with the digitalization of our society, saw his culture moving slowly away from the tactile. As reaction to this, in 2008 he left his multimedia career and embraced the physical objects. Fascinated by the creative possibilities of plastic, he started a new stage as product designer, sculptor and painter under his own brand The Secret Lapo Laboratories (also known as Lapolab.).

== Arts and products ==
His first independent project was the now famous "Jumping Brain", a combination of brain and frog, inspired by "the historical stories about crazy and funny ideas that people had to go over the Berlin Wall" as he states in an interview. The first sculptures were homemade by himself as limited editions, and was awarded first prize in the Plastic and Plush Toy Awards, Best Sculpting Category in 2008. Early 2009 he partnered with the designer toy company Toy2R to produce it as a designer toy. This simple idea with its clean, detailed design and a sense of whimsy has positioned him in the top tier of most select collectors selling out extremely quickly. Large scale and bronze versions of the "Jumping Brain" were sold in "SCOPE Art Show 2011", "Swab Barcelona Contemporary Art Fair 2012" and was also image of "MIA Art Fair 2012".

Emilio continues exploring the neuroplasticity of human brain and introduced the "Skull Brain" at "CONTEXT Art Miami 2012", and its large scale version in "Pulse Miami 2013" among others. He than became involved in many neuro-urban merchandising, from designer toys to skate decks, clothing, prints and more, collaborating with brands like Disney or Chanel and artists like Paul Frank or Mark Ryden. His works have been on display in different museums around the world like the "Musée des Beaux Arts" in Québec and the "International Museum of Surgical Science" of Chicago. He has gone on to create many other whimsical brain-based sculptures and paintings including the recent "Sponge Brain" and "Brain Heart", the latter for "Art Fair Tokyo 2016" and "Swab Barcelona Contemporary Art Fair 2016".

== Publications ==
Emilio Garcia's artwork is reviewed on many art, design and culture magazines like Clutter, Neo2 or Juxtapoz, featured in several exhibition catalogues, and have contributed in different books such "We are Indie Toys" by HarperCollins ISBN 9780062293435, "Resin Toys" by Lemo Editorial ISBN 8494115421 or "Skullture: Skulls in Contemporary Visual Culture" by Gingko Press ISBN 1584236132

He also was interviewed and contributed in the documentary "An Artisan Designer Toy" by Jose .M Cuñat & Victor M. Mezquida back in 2014. He talk about his life and inspirations, as well as his creative process.

== Selected exhibitions ==
- "Block Mickey" by Disney. Times Square, Hong Kong, 2009
- "Swab Barcelona Contemporary Art Fair", Iguapop Gallery booth. Barcelona, Spain, 2010
- "Street Anatomy", International Museum of Surgical Science. Chicago, US, 2010
- "Conjoined in 3D", Copro Gallery. Santa Monica, US, 2011
- "Art@HBM", Musée des Beaux Arts. Québec, Canada, 2011
- "Brain Evolution", Toy Art Gallery. LA, US, 2011
- "SCOPE Art Show", Black Square Gallery booth. Miami, US, 2011
- "Miami International Art Fair" (MIA), Black Square Gallery booth. Miami, US, 2012
- "Jumping Brain" Workshop and Lecture, Drexel University. Philadelphia, US, 2012
- "Emilio Garcia's OTIVM", Artoyz Gallery. Paris, France, 2012
- "Toy'z Swab", Sotheby's Beneficial Auction. Barcelona, Spain, 2012
- "CONTEXT Art Miami", Black Square Gallery booth. Miami, US, 2012
- "At home I'm a tourist" – Selim Varol Collection, CAC Málaga, Spain, 2013
- "Face Off", International Museum of Surgical Science. Chicago, US, 2013
- "PULSE Miami", Black Square Gallery booth. Miami, US, 2013
- "HOCA Foundation Beneficial Auction", Paddle8, Hong Kong, 2015
- "Art Fair Tokyo". JPS Gallery booth. Tokyo, Japan, 201
- "Brain Being" solo show. JPS Gallery. Hong Kong, 2017

== Sources ==
- Baselga, Jose M. "Salto con cerebro en El Vendrell", Diari de Tarragona, p. 64, May 2009.
- Nardon, Florian. “Emilio Garcia”, “Be Street Magazine”, pp. 102–103, September 2009.
- Cogotudo, Santi. “Jumping Brain, cerebros de edición limitada", Supplement Cultura Tendències, IV/244, p. 4, El Mundo, February 11, 2010.
- Baselga, Jose M. "El poder de la mente", Economía y Negocios, 855, pp. 1, 7, Diari de Tarragona, March 7, 2010.
- San Jose, Paloma. "Los cerebros de diseño de Emilio Garcia", Expansión, p. 5, May 19, 2010.
- Carney, Rob. "Comercial Characters: The Jumping Brain comes to life”, ‘’Computer Art Projects’’, p. 89, August 2010.
- Baselga, Jose M. "El ‘cerebro’ del Vendrell, una estrella en Holywood", Diari de Tarragona, p. 17, August 28, 2011.
- Jáquez, Andrés, “EMILIO”, “Medina Magazine”, Cover, pp. 67–93, July 2012.
- Bou, Louis & Minguet, Josep Maria, "Swab Toy'z by Fls", Monsa ISBN 8415223668, pp. 66, 67, 180, 181, October 2012.
- Varesi, Annalisa. “Emilio Garcia", “Wait! Magazine”, pp. 20–26, March 2013.
- Bou, Louis. “We Are Indie Toys”, HarperCollins, ISBN 0062293435, pag 200 to 207, February 2014.
- Abio, Javier & Romero, Manu, "UI Designer", Neo2 Magazine, 130, pag 47, February 2014.
- Cuñat, Jose M. & Mesquita, Victor M. "An Artisian Designer Toy" Documentary, Syntetyk, July 2014.
- Curtis, Nick, "The Thinking Man", "Clutter Magazine", pp. 48–53, Fall 2014.
- Sesé, Teresa. "Una volta al món en 65 stands. Els insectes es vestixen de Chanel", La Vanguardia, p. 43, October 2, 2015.
- Bendando, Luca & Dizman, Paz. "Skullture: Skulls in Contemporary Visual Culture”, pp. 106, 107 Gingko Press ISBN 1584236132, November 2015.
