= Sylvia Amorsolo-Lazo =

Filipino painter and president

Sylvia Amorsolo-Lazo (born 1943) is a Filipino painter and the president of the Fernando C. Amorsolo Foundation. She is the daughter of Fernando Amorsolo, Philippine's first national artist. She is one of the five siblings who followed in her father's footsteps and became painters.

In 1961, Lazo became her father's apprentice and assistant. She stood as the authenticator of her father's paintings.

On February 3, 2003, she together with her siblings founded the Fernando C. Amorsolo Foundation. The foundation pursues preservation of the works of Filipino painter, Fernando Amorsolo and to restore and validate the artist’s paintings, sketches and various works.

== Life ==
Lazo was born in 1943 and is the daughter of Fernando Amorsolo and Maria Del Carmen. She has nineteen siblings. She studied at Holy Ghost College (now College of the Holy Spirit Manila). She is married to Herman Lazo.

== Paintings ==
- 1992 "Patintero", oil on canvas, 29x39in.

== Books ==
- 1992 Fernando C. Amorsolo: Drawings
- 2009 Maestro Fernando C. Amorsolo: Recollections of the Amorsolo Family

== See also ==
- Fernando Amorsolo
