= Pablo Amorsolo =

Filipino painter

- Born: Pablo Cueto; June 26, 1898; Daet, Camarines Norte, Captaincy General of the Philippines
- Died: February 21, 1945 (aged 46); Antipolo, Rizal, Philippine Commonwealth
- Education: University of the Philippines
- Known for: Painting
- Notable work: Ferdinand Magellan and Natives; Piro (1930); The Discovery of the Philippines (1945)
- Family: Fernando Amorsolo (brother)

Pablo Cueto Amorsolo (born Pablo Cueto; June 26, 1898 – February 21, 1945) was a Filipino painter. He was the younger brother of the Philippine National Artist Fernando Amorsolo.

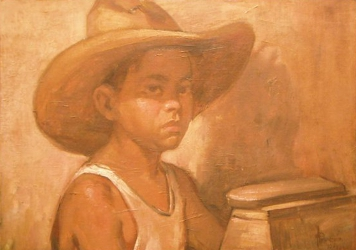
Limpia Botas by Pablo Amorsolo, University of Santo Tomas Collection.

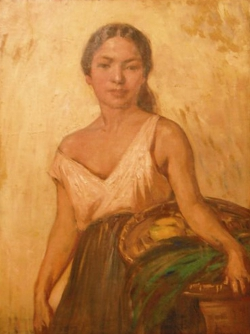
Fruit Vendor by Pablo Amorsolo, University of Santo Tomas Collection.

== Biography ==
Pablo Amorsolo y Cueto was born in Daet, Camarines Norte to husband and wife Pedro Amorsolo, a book keeper, and Bonifacia Cueto y Vélez. When he was eight years old, his family moved to Manila.

During World War II, Amorsolo engaged in partisan activities under the Japanese regime and was said to have gained the rank of Colonel under the Kempeitai. Eventually he was captured by Filipino troops.

Some sources say that he was sentenced and executed by firing squad in the hands of guerillas, and that he died in this manner at Antipolo, Rizal in 1945. His death record from the Manila Civil Registry says that he died of "perforation of intestines" in Calle Lealtad in Manila, and was buried at the Balic-balic Church in Sampaloc, Manila.

== Education ==
He became an apprentice-painter under the guidance of his uncle, Fabián de la Rosa, an expert painter. After elementary schooling, Amorsolo studied at the Lyceum of Manila. He later graduated from the School of Fine Arts of the University of the Philippines in 1924.

Two years after enrolling as a student at the University of the Philippines, he was appointed as an assistant-teacher for painting. He taught painting until the arrival of the Second World War.

== Career ==
Amorsolo was an enthusiast of both classical and modern-day forms of art. During the 1930s, he drew and painted may editorial illustrations for Philippine magazines such as the Graphic, Tribune, La Vanguardia, Herald, and Manila Times. He became one of the causes for the rise of the so-called genre art in the Philippines, because he weaved, through his artistic brush strokes, a wide variety of images that show native and social scenes and scenarios. He was also a known master of portrait paintings who had the ability to give life to any individual subject. He painted people from different levels of society and also from varied age brackets, where he was able to present his ability to understand the characteristics and personalities of his human subjects. He also created works that portray themes related to Philippine history. Examples of these are the large images of Magellan and the Natives and The Discovery of the Philippines. The latter was painted in 1944.

Most of Amorsolo's paintings were destroyed by a fire that occurred in 1945.

== Works ==
- Ferdinand Magellan and Natives
- Piro, oil on canvas, 183 x 138 mm, 1930
- The Discovery of the Philippines, 1945

== See also ==
- Arts of the Philippines
