= Libingan ng mga Bayani =

National cemetery in Taguig, Philippines

- Philippines
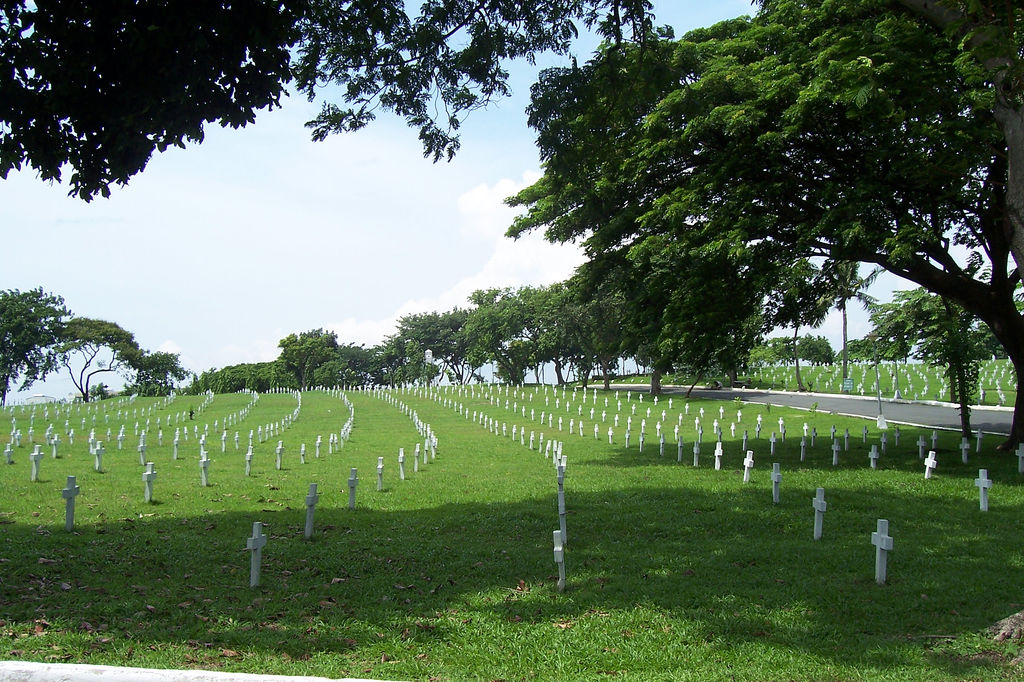
- Used for those deceased
- Established: May 1947 (as Republic Memorial Cemetery)
- Location: 14.520°N 121.044°E; Fort Bonifacio, Western Bicutan, Taguig, Philippines
- Website: https://pvao.gov.ph/military-shrines/libingan-ng-mga-bayani/

Libingan ng mga Bayani (LNMB, locally [liːˈbiːŋan ˈnaŋ maˈŋa baˈjaːni], lit. 'Cemetery of [the] Heroes') is a national cemetery within Fort Bonifacio (formerly Fort William McKinley) in Barangay Western Bicutan, Taguig, Philippines.

First established in May 1947 as a fitting resting place for Philippine military personnel from privates to generals who served during World War II, it eventually became designated as the official place of burial for deceased Philippine presidents, national heroes, patriots, National Artists and National Scientists.

Among those buried in the cemetery are Filipino soldiers who died during the Philippine Campaign and the Liberation of the Philippines in World War II from 1941 to 1945. Among the Filipino leaders and dignitaries buried there are Presidents Elpidio Quirino, Carlos P. Garcia and Diosdado Macapagal; former Vice President Salvador H. Laurel; generals Artemio Ricarte and Carlos P. Romulo; Armed Forces of the Philippines Chief of Staff Angelo Reyes; and former Senate Presidents Arturo Tolentino and Blas Ople. Fidel Ramos is the most recent president to be buried there, on August 9, 2022.

== History ==
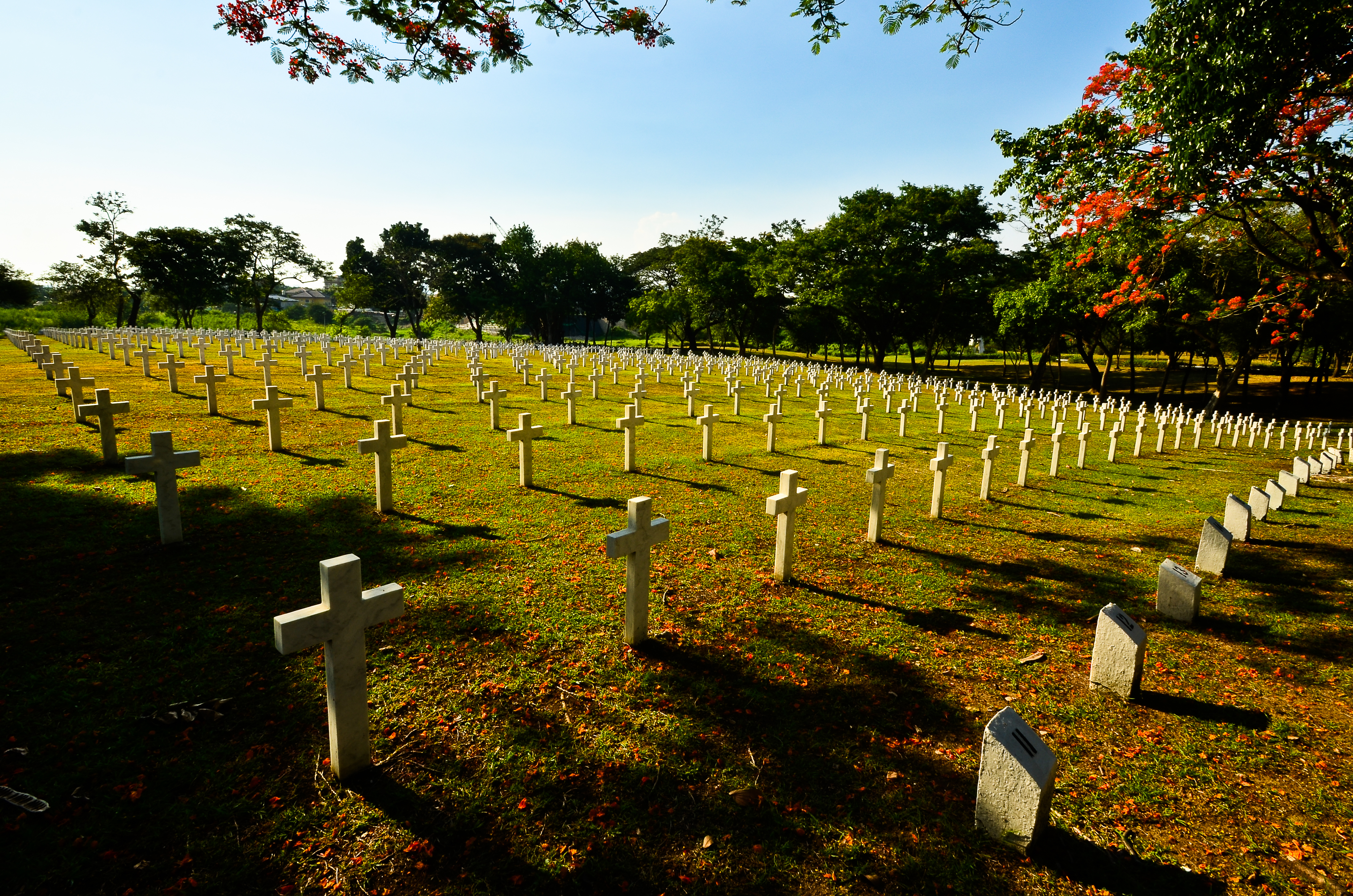
Tombstones of fallen Filipino soldiers at the Libingan ng mga Bayani

The cemetery was first established in May 1947 as the Republic Memorial Cemetery. It was first established as a tribute and final resting place for the 33,520 to 58,780 Filipino soldiers who died during the Philippine Campaign (1941–42) and the Allied Liberation of the Philippines (1944–45) in World War II. It was established as the Filipino counterpart to the Manila American Cemetery and Memorial, which houses the remains of United States personnel who died during the same war.

On June 16, 1948, Philippine President Elpidio Quirino signed into law the Republic Act 289, also known as An Act Providing for the Construction of a National Pantheon for Presidents of the Philippines, National Heroes, and Patriots of the Country. Section 1 of the Act cites the purpose of creating such pantheon:

To perpetuate the memory of all the Presidents of the Philippines, national heroes and patriots for the inspiration and emulation of this generation and of generations still unborn...

While such National Pantheon was never established during Quirino's lifetime, several decrees and laws passed under succeeding administrations led to the eventual use of the Republic Memorial Cemetery as a national pantheon described in Republic Act 289.

On October 27, 1954, President Ramon Magsaysay renamed the Republic Memorial Cemetery as the Libingan ng mga Bayani. On May 28, 1967, President Ferdinand Marcos issued Presidential Proclamation No. 208 ordering the reservation of 142 hectares of land within Fort Bonifacio in consideration for the Libingan to serve not only as a cemetery for military personnel but also as a national shrine for fallen heroes. He ordered it placed under the administration of the Military Shrines Services of the Philippine Veterans Affairs Office, an agency under the Department of National Defense.

On April 9, 1986, Armed Forces of the Philippines Chief of Staff Fidel Ramos and President Corazon Aquino issued Armed Forces Regulations G 161-373, also known as "The allocation of Cemetery Plots at the LNMB". This military-issued regulation established the interment policy that would become the basis for the burial of personalities at the Libingan ng mga Bayani. Moreover, by virtue of Executive Order No. 131 issued by former President Fidel Ramos on 26 October 1993, National Artists and National Scientists of the Philippines were also made eligible for interment at the cemetery.

In 2007, due to overcrowding at the Fort Bonifacio site, the cemetery's administration started exploring sites for Libingan ng mga Bayani annexes in Luzon, Visayas and Mindanao. Only one has been completed so far, the ₱24-million, five-hectare extension at Camp Hernandez in Dingle, Iloilo.

On November 18, 2016, former dictator Ferdinand Marcos was buried in a private ceremony with military honors, amid much controversy resulting in a handful of protests in various parts of the Philippines.

On January 4, 2019, a five-year development program for the cemetery, which is projected to cost about ₱3.3 billion, was approved by Secretary of National Defense Delfin Lorenzana. The program's goal is to rehabilitate and transform the LNMB into a world-class national cemetery at par with the nearby Manila American Cemetery. The first phase of the program is to be implemented by the Bases Conversion and Development Authority and includes the construction of a dignified cemetery area, a historical theme park, and a memorial shrine.

== Administration ==
The cemetery is administered and maintained by the Grave Service Unit (GSU), a unit of the Philippine Army Support Command of the AFP. Its mission is to provide burial and niche services to deceased military personnel and other personalities interred at the cemetery. Aside from maintaining the cemetery and the military grave site at Manila North Cemetery, the unit is also capable of providing mortuary and memorial services to authorized personnel.

== Interment policy ==
According to Armed Forces of the Philippines (AFP) Regulation G 161-373, the following persons are entitled to interment at the Libingan ng mga Bayani:

- Medal of Valor awardees
- Presidents or Commanders-in-Chief, AFP
- Vice Presidents of the Philippines
- The secretaries of National Defense
- AFP Chiefs of Staff
- General/Flag Officers
- Active and retired military personnel of the AFP
- Justices of the Supreme Court (either Chief or Associate Justice)
- Justices of the Court of Appeals (either Chief or Associate Justice)
- Senators and Senate President
- Former AFP members who laterally entered/joined the Philippine National Police (PNP) and the Philippine Coast Guard (PCG)
- Veterans of the Philippine Revolution of 1896, the First and Second World Wars, as well as recognized guerrillas
- Government dignitaries, statesmen, national artists and other deceased persons whose interment has been approved by the commander-in-chief, Congress or the Secretary of National Defense, and
- Former Presidents, Vice Presidents, Secretaries of National Defense, widows of former Presidents and Chiefs of Staff
- National Artists and National Scientists of the Philippines

However, the same regulation also prohibits "personnel who were dishonorably separated/ reverted/ discharged from the service and personnel who were convicted by final judgment of an offense involving moral turpitude" from interment at the Libingan ng mga Bayani.

== Features ==
The first structure that visitors will see upon entering the grounds of the cemetery complex is the Heroes Memorial Gate, a large concrete tripod with a stairway leading to an upper view deck with a metal sculpture at the center. Erected on opposite sides of the main entrance road near the Heroes Memorial Gate are two 12-foot (3.7 m) high black stone walls which bear the words that General Douglas MacArthur uttered during a journey to the Philippines in 1961: "I do not know the dignity of his birth, but I do know the glory of his death."

The main structure, located at the center of the cemetery, is the Tomb of the Unknown Soldier, where wreath laying ceremonies are held when Philippine government officials and foreign dignitaries visit the cemetery. Inscribed on the tomb are the words: "Here lies a Filipino soldier whose name is known only to God." Behind the tomb are three marble pillars representing the three main island groups in the Philippines: Luzon, Visayas, and Mindanao.

There are several pylons as well commemorating the gallantry of Filipino soldiers who died in various wars in world history. These include the Korean Memorial Pylon, which honors 112 Filipino officers and men who were members of the Philippine Expeditionary Forces to Korea (PEFTOK) who perished during the Korean War; the Vietnam Veterans Memorial Pylon, which was dedicated to the members of the Philippine contingent and Philippine civic action groups (PHILCON-V and PHILCAG-V) that were sent to Vietnam during the Vietnam War from 1964 to 1971; and the Philippine World War II Guerrillas Pylon, which was erected by the Veterans Federation of the Philippines as a testimony to the indomitable spirit and bravery of the Filipino guerrillas of World War II.

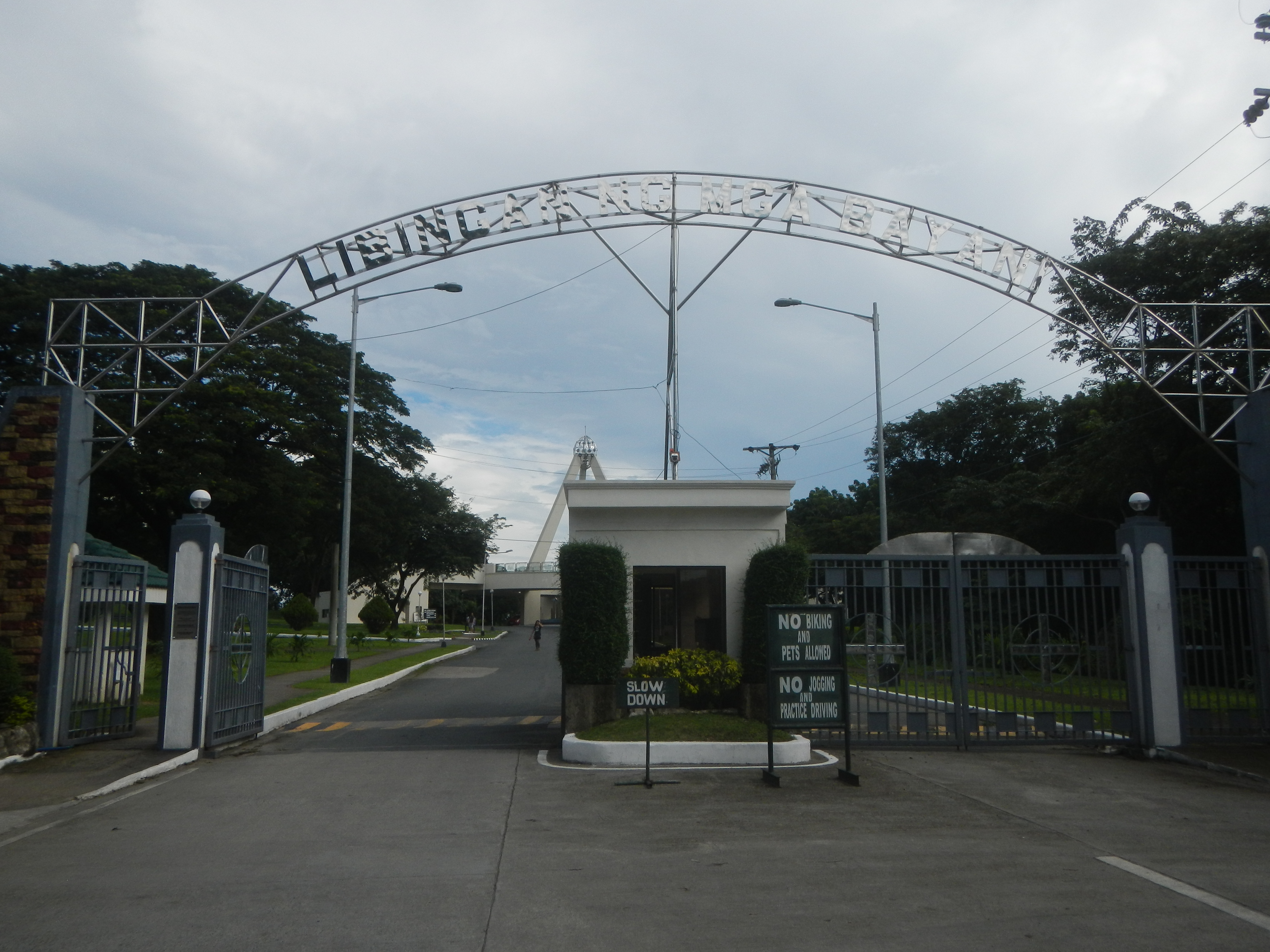
Entrance gate

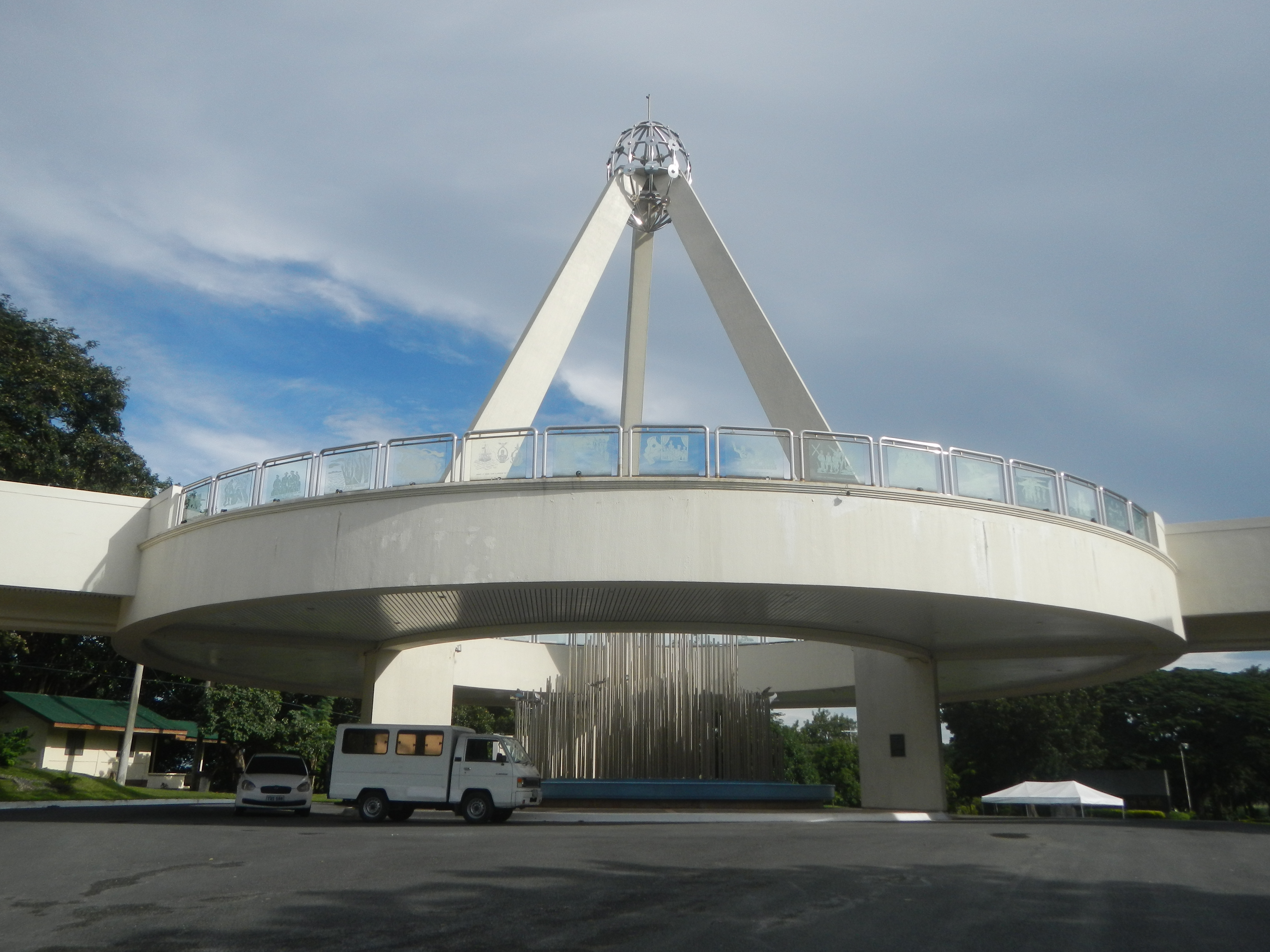
Heroes Memorial Gate

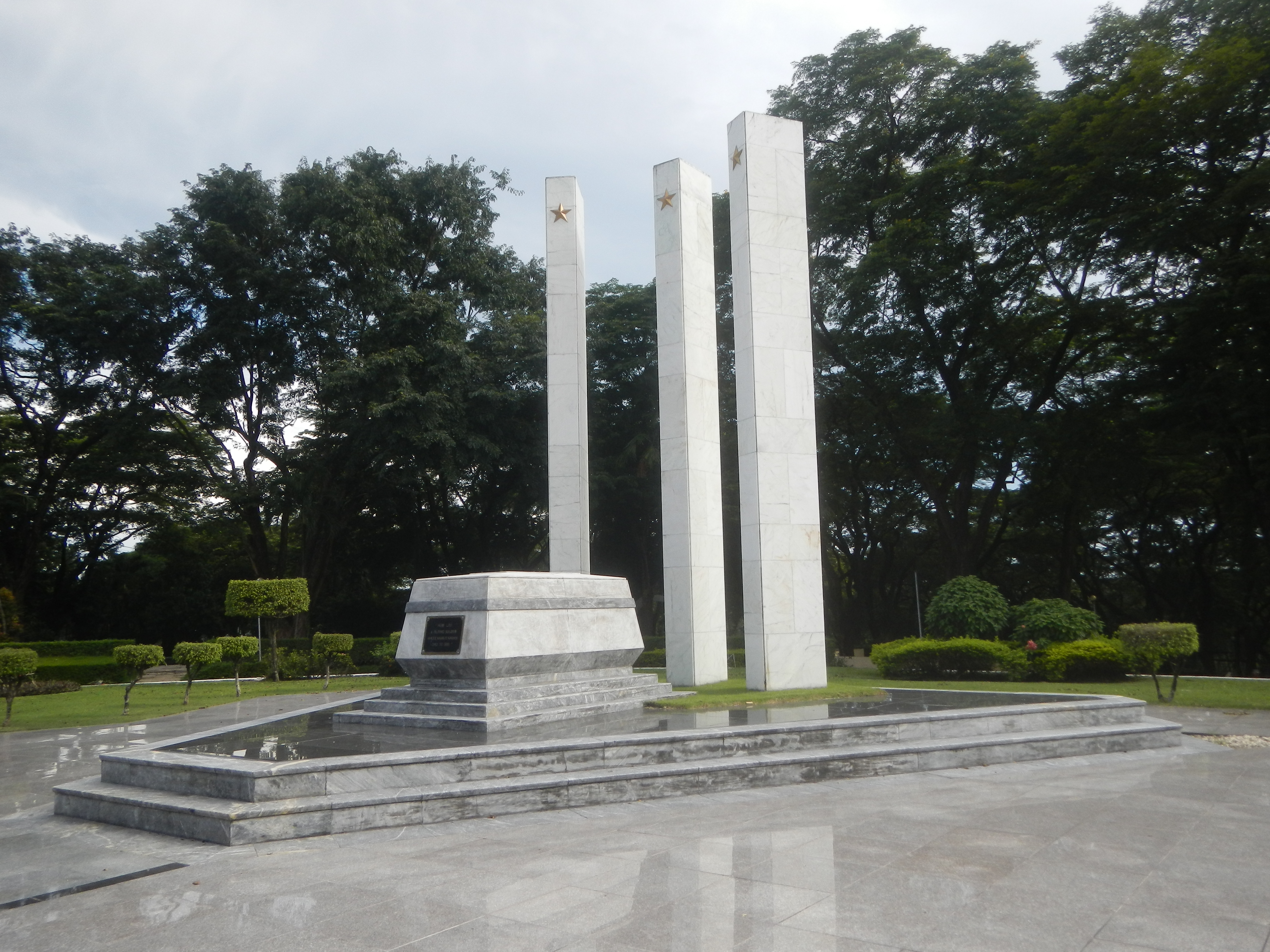
Tomb of the Unknown Soldier

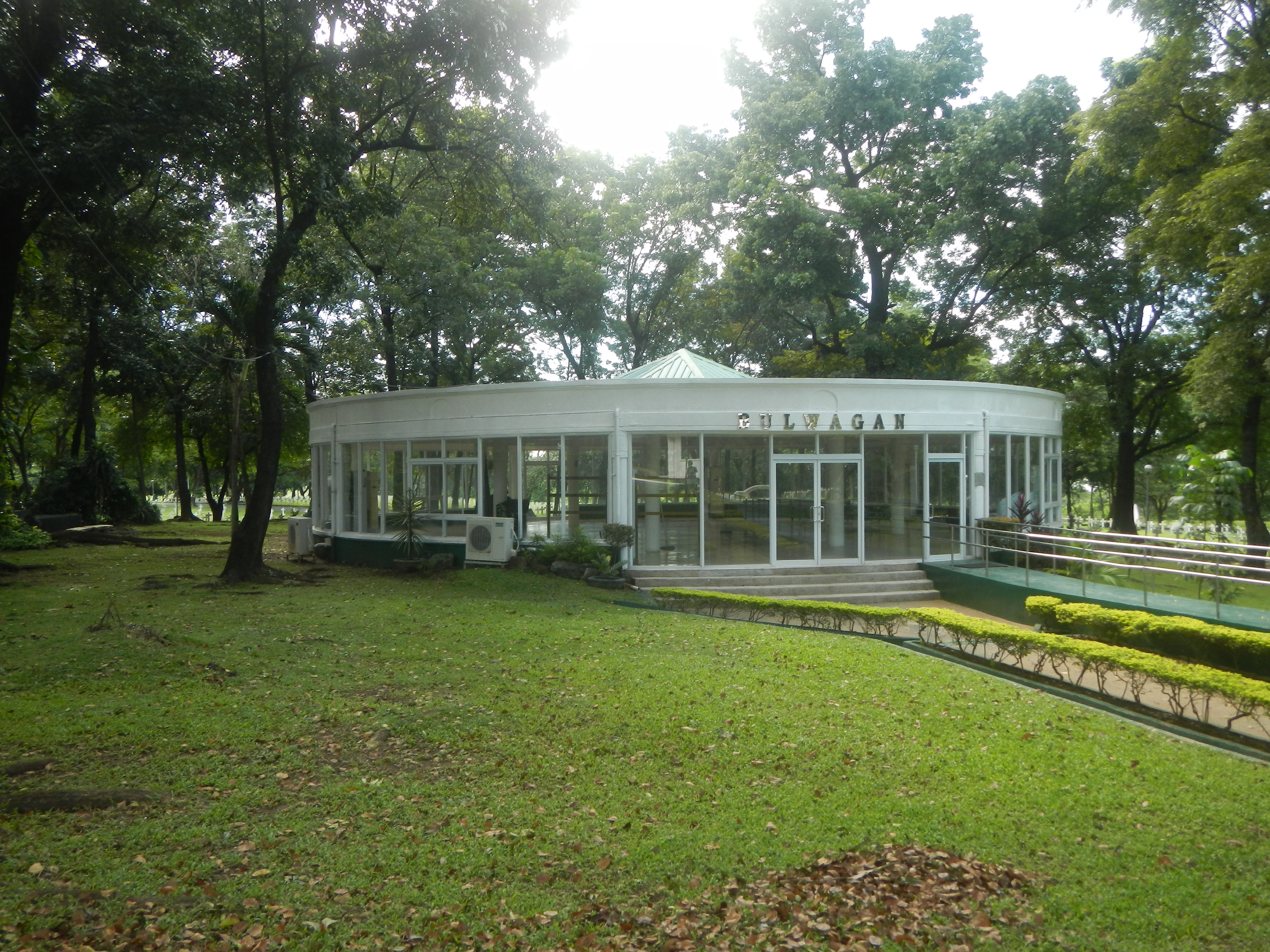
Bulwagan

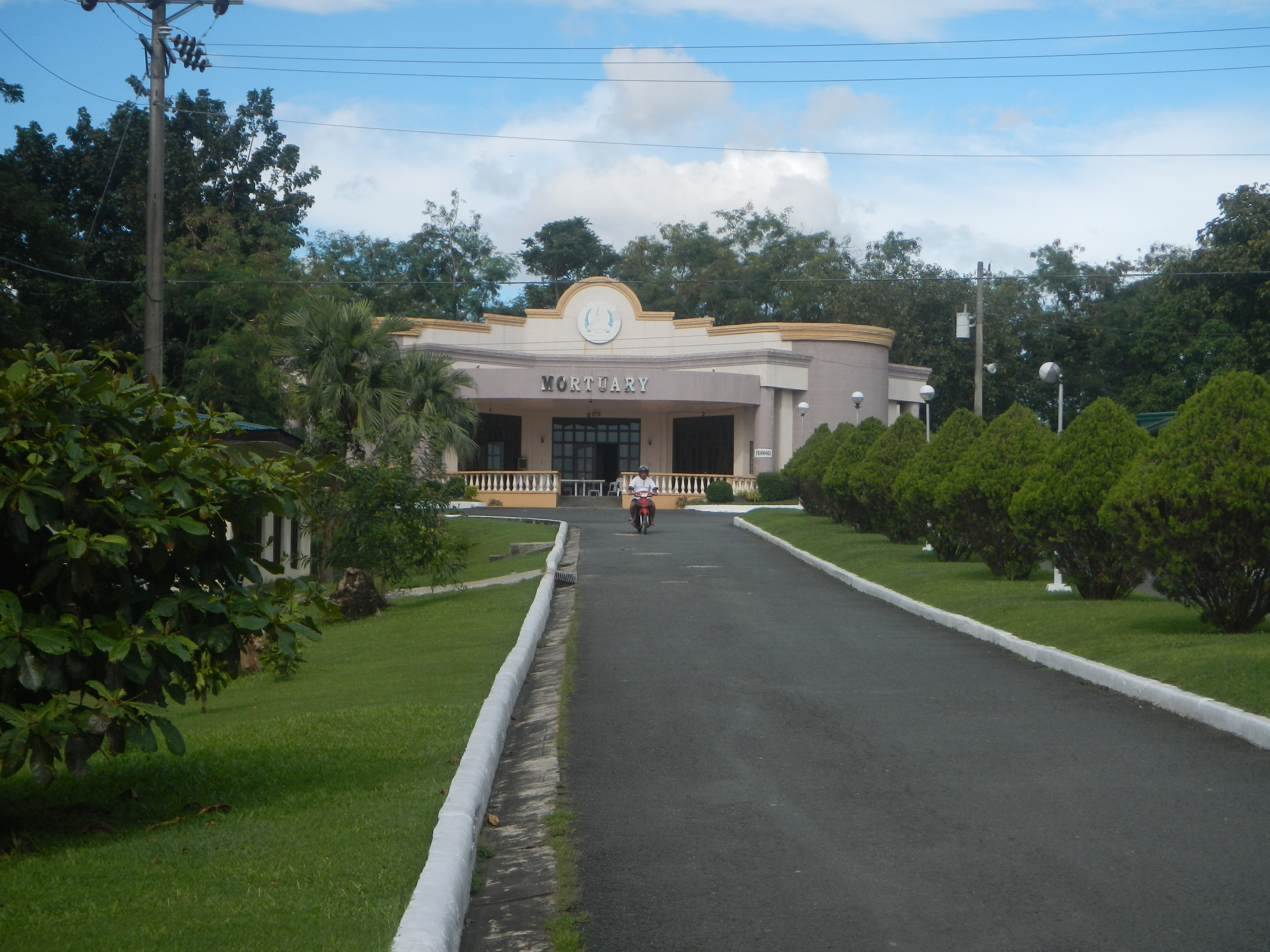
Mortuary

== Notable burials ==
=== Presidents of the Philippines ===
- Elpidio Quirino (1890–1956), 6th President
- Carlos P. Garcia (1896–1971), 8th President. Buried with his wife, former First Lady Leonila Garcia.
- Diosdado Macapagal (1910–1997), 9th President. Buried with his second wife, former First Lady Eva Macapagal.
- Ferdinand Marcos (1917–1989), 10th President
- Fidel V. Ramos (1928–2022), 12th President

=== Vice President of the Philippines ===
- Salvador H. Laurel (1928–2004), 10th Vice President

=== Speaker of the House of Representatives ===
- Jose de Venecia Jr., 17th and 21st Speaker of House of Representatives

=== Chief Justices of the Philippines ===
- Fred Ruiz Castro, (1914–1979), 12th Chief Justice of the Supreme Court of the Philippines
- Enrique Fernando, (1915–2004), 13th Chief Justice of the Supreme Court of the Philippines
- Claudio Teehankee, Sr. (1918–1989), 16th Chief Justice of the Supreme Court of the Philippines

=== Senators of the Philippines ===
- Arturo Tolentino (1910–2004), former Secretary of Foreign Affairs and Senator
- Blas Ople (1927–2003), Secretary of Foreign Affairs and Senator
- Rodolfo Biazon (1935–2023), Senator, 21st Chief of Staff of the Armed Forces of the Philippines and Member of the House of Representatives of the Philippines from Muntinlupa
- Juan Ponce Enrile (1924–2025), Chief Presidential Legal Counsel, former Secretary of National Defense, Senator, and Member of the House of Representatives of the Philippines from Cagayan

=== Government dignitaries ===
- Carlos P. Romulo (1898–1985), former Minister of Foreign Affairs, President of the United Nations General Assembly, and National Artist for Literature
- Alejandro Roces (1924–2011, former chairman of Movie and Television Review and Classification Board, former Secretary of Education, and National Artist for Literature
- Juan Cailles (1871 – 1951), a commanding officer of the Philippine Revolutionary Army who served during the Philippine Revolution and Philippine–American War. He later served as the first governor of Laguna.
- Haydee Yorac (1941–2005), Chairperson of the Presidential Commission on Good Government
- Rodolfo Severino Jr. (1936–2019), Filipino diplomat who served as the tenth secretary-general of ASEAN
- Gilberto Teodoro Sr. (1927–2008), former administrator of Social Security System

=== Secretaries of National Defense ===
- Alejo Santos (1911–1984), former Secretary of National Defense
- Ernesto S. Mata (1915–2012), former Secretary of National Defense
- Rafael Ileto (1920–2003), former Secretary of National Defense
- Fortunato Abat (1925–2018), former Secretary of National Defense

=== Chiefs of Staff the Armed Forces of the Philippines ===
- Artemio Ricarte (1866–1945), Philippine Revolutionary Army Chief of Staff
- Gen. Alfredo M. Santos (1905–1990), 11th Chief of Staff of the Armed Forces of the Philippines
- Gen. Arturo T. Enrile (1940–1998), 24th Chief of Staff of the Armed Forces of the Philippines
- Gen. Angelo T. Reyes (1945–2011), 28th Chief of Staff of the Armed Forces of the Philippines

=== National Scientists of the Philippines ===
- Eduardo Quisumbing (1895–1986), National Scientist of the Philippines for Plant Taxonomy, Systematics, and Morphology
- Geminiano de Ocampo (1907–1987), National Scientist of the Philippines for Ophthalmology
- Juan Salcedo Jr. (1904–1988), National Scientist of the Philippines for Nutrition & Public Health
- Julian Banzon (1908–1988), National Scientist of the Philippines for Chemistry
- Gregorio Velasquez (1901-1989), National Scientist of the Philippines for Phycology and his wife Carmen C. Velasquez (1913-1994), National Scientist of the Philippines for Parasitology. First married couple to become Philippine National Scientists.
- José Encarnación Jr. (1928–1998), National Scientist of the Philippines for Economics
- Luz Oliveros-Belardo (1906–1999) National Scientist of the Philippines for Phytochemistry
- Encarnacion Alzona (1895–2001), pioneering Filipino historian, educator and suffragist. The first Filipino woman to obtain a Ph.D., and she was conferred in 1985 the rank and title of National Scientist of the Philippines for Philippine History.
- Alfredo Lagmay (1919–2005), a Philippine psychologist whose studies on experimental analysis of behavior modification, relaxation and related states, and hypnosis
- Fe Del Mundo (1911–2011), a Philippine pediatrician whose studies led to the improvement of the neonatal incubator
- Perla Santos-Ocampo (1931–2012), a Philippine pediatrician whose studies on malnutrition and child growth and development were instrumental to the country's fight against child malnutrition
- Benito Vergara (1934–2015), National Scientist of the Philippines for Plant Physiology
- Gelia T. Castillo (1928–2017), National Scientist of the Philippines for Rural Sociology
- Teodulo Topacio, Jr. (1924–2019), National Scientist of the Philippines for Veterinary Medicine
- Ramon Barba (1939 – October 2021), National Scientist of the Philippines for Horticulture

=== National Artists of the Philippines ===
- Guillermo Tolentino (1890–1976), National Artist for Visual Arts
- Victorio Edades (1895–1985), National Artist for Visual Arts
- Ang Kiukok (1931–2005), National Artistfor Visual Arts
- José T. Joya (1931–1995), National Artistfor Visual Arts
- Napoleon Abueva (1930–2018), National Artist for Visual Arts
- Abdulmari Imao (1936–2014), National Artist for Visual Arts
- Larry Alcala (1926–2002), National Artist for Visual Arts
- Arturo Luz (1926–2021), National Artist for Visual Arts
- José María Zaragoza (1912–1994), National Artist for Architecture
- Francisco Mañosa (1931–2019), National Artist for Architecture
- Ramón Valera (1912–1972), National Artist for Fashion Design
- Leonor Orosa-Goquingco (1917–2005), National Artist for Dance
- Francisca Reyes-Aquino (1899–1983), National Artist for Dance
- Levi Celerio (1910–2002), National Artist for Music
- Ernani Cuenco (1936–1988), National Artist for Music
- Jovita Fuentes (1894–1980), National Artist for Music
- Antonio J. Molina (1895–1978), National Artist for Music
- Col. Antonino R. Buenaventura (1904–1996), National Artist for Music
- Andrea Veneracion (1928–2013), National Artist for Music. Buried with her husband, Dr. Felipe Rivera Veneracion.
- Francisco Feliciano (1941–2014), National Artist for Music
- Nick Joaquin (1917–2004), National Artist for Literature. Part of his ashes are buried at his family's tomb at Loyola Memorial Park.
- N. V. M. Gonzalez (1915–1999), National Artist for Literature. Buried with his wife, Narita Manuel Gonzalez.
- Francisco Arcellana (1916–2002), National Artist for Literature. Buried with his wife, Emerenciana Yuvienco Arcellana.
- Cirilo Bautista (1941–2018), National Artist for Literature
- Bienvenido Lumbera (1932–2021), National Artist for Literature. Buried with his wife, Cynthia Nograles Lumbera.
- F. Sionil José (1924–2022), National Artist for Literature. Buried with his wife, Teresita Jovellanos Jose.
- Carlos Quirino (1910–1999), National Artist for Historical Literature. Buried with his wife, Liesel Commans Quirino.
- Wilfrido Ma. Guerrero (1911–1995), National Artist for Theater
- Amelia Lapeña-Bonifacio (1930–2020), National Artist for Theater
- Gerardo de León (1913–1981), National Artist for Film and Broadcast Arts
- Eddie Romero (1924–2013), National Artist for Film and Broadcast Arts
- Marilou Diaz-Abaya (1955–2012), National Artist for Film and Broadcast Arts
- Ishmael Bernal (1938–1996), National Artist for Film
- Nora Aunor (1953–2025), National Artist for Film and Broadcast Arts

=== Medal of Valor Recipients ===
- Col. Jesus A. Villamor (1914–1971), a Filipino American pilot who fought the Japanese in World War II.
- Capt. Rommel Sandoval (1979–2017), Hero of Marawi Siege

=== Military Officers and Civilians ===
- Rafael Crame (1863-1927), first Filipino Chief of the Philippine Constabulary
- Magdalena Leones (1920–2016), intelligence officer during World War II and the first and only Asian to receive a Silver Star Medal for her wartime contributions.
- Oscar M. Alcaraz (1953–1970), Boy Scout and the first non-military, non-President, to be buried in LNMB.
- Teodoro Locsín Sr. (1914–2000), Philippine Free Press editor, World War II guerilla, journalist
- Max Soliven (1929–2006), The Philippine Star journalist and co-founder

=== Former interments ===
- Vicente Manansala (1910–1981), National Artist for Visual Arts. His remains were exhumed and transferred to Loyola Memorial Park.
- Cesar Legaspi (1917–1994), National Artist for Visual Arts. His remains were exhumed and transferred to Manila Memorial Park – Sucat. The Legaspi Family decided the transfer of his remains in protest of the burial of Ferdinand Marcos

== See also ==
- Burial of Ferdinand Marcos
- Manila American Cemetery
- Capas National Shrine
- Mount Samat National Shrine
- Monument memorializing WW-II landing U.S. forces in Barangay Sawang, Romblon, Romblon
