= National Artist of the Philippines =

Philippine order

Order of National Artists of the Philippines Orden ng mga Pambansang Alagad ng Sining ng Pilipinas
- Emblem of the Order of National Artists, which appears on the collar bestowed on members.

Awarded by Philippines
- Type: Order
- Awarded for: Having made significant contributions to the development of Philippine arts
- Status: Currently constituted
- Sovereign: President of the Philippines

Statistics
- First induction: 1972

Precedence
- Next (higher): Order of Gabriela Silang
- Next (lower): Gawad Mabini
- Equivalent: Order of National Scientists, Gawad sa Manlilikha ng Bayan, Order of Lakandula – Special Class of Champion for Life
- Ribbon bar of the Order

The Order of National Artists of the Philippines (Tagalog: Orden ng mga Pambansang Alagad ng Sining ng Pilipinas) is an order bestowed by the President of the Philippines on Philippine nationals who have made significant contributions to the development of Philippine art. Members of the order are known as National Artists. Originally instituted as an award, it was elevated to the status of an order in 2003.

The order is administered by the Cultural Center of the Philippines by virtue of President Ferdinand Marcos's Proclamation No. 1001 of April 27, 1972, and the National Commission for Culture and the Arts. The first award was posthumously conferred on Filipino painter Fernando Amorsolo.

== Definition ==
The order of the highest state honor is conferred on individuals deemed as having done much for their artistic field. Deserving individuals must have been recommended by both the Cultural Center and the National Commission for Culture and the Arts prior to receiving the award. Such people are then titled, by virtue of a Presidential Proclamation, as National Artist (Filipino: Gawad Pambansang Alagad ng Sining), and are inducted into the order. Due to the non-retroactive nature of Proclamation No. 1001, artists who have died before 1972 are currently unable to be honored in the National Artist roster. Some individuals who have made significant contributions to the arts that are unable to be bestowed with the title of "National Artist" include Jose Rizal, Leona Florentino, Juan Luna, and Félix Resurrección Hidalgo. The Congress of the Philippines or the President of the Philippines has yet to either enact a law or release a presidential proclamation that would allow Filipinos who died before 1972 to be declared as National Artists. Three Filipino artists were given "special exemption" from the non-retroactive rule (Amorsolo, Francisco, and Hernandez), as they died within the so-called "final years" of the Third Philippine Republic (1965–1972) and not before that time.

== Categories ==
Categories under which National Artists can be recognized originally included:

- Music – singing, composition, direction, and/or performance;
- Dance – choreography, direction and/or performance;
- Theater – direction, performance and/or production design;
- Contemporary Arts – painting, sculpture, printmaking, photography, installation art, mixed media works, illustration, graphic arts, performance art and/or imaging;
- Literature – poetry, fiction, essay, playwriting, journalism and/or literary criticism;
- Film and Broadcasting/Broadcast Arts – direction, writing, production design, cinematography, editing, camera work, and/or performance; and
- Architecture, Design and Allied Arts – architecture design, interior design, industrial arts design, landscape architecture and fashion design.

However, National Artists have since been honored under new categories. The NCCA created the category of National Artist for Fashion Design when it nominated Ramon Valera, but subsumed that category under "Architecture, Design and Allied Arts". President Fidel V. Ramos issued an executive order creating the category of National Artist for Historical Literature before conferring the honor to Carlos Quirino.

== Criteria ==
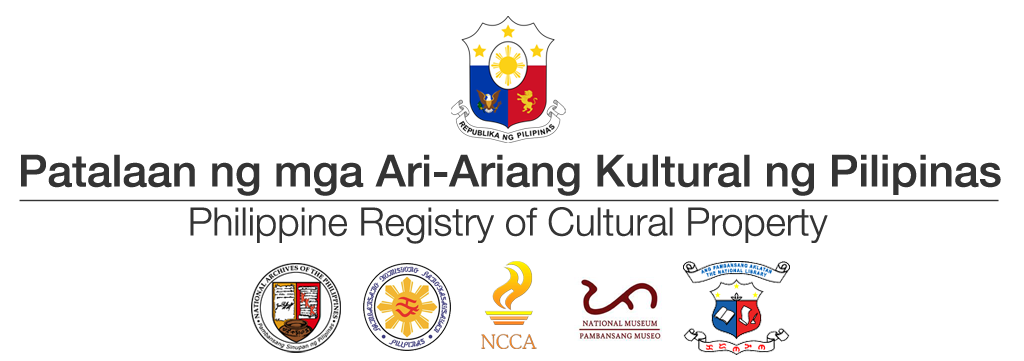
Current logo for the Philippine Registry of Cultural Property

The National Artists of the Philippines is based on broad criteria, as set forth by the Cultural Center of the Philippines and the National Commission on Culture and the Arts:

1. Living artists who have been Filipino citizens for the last ten years prior to nomination as well as those who have died after the establishment of the Award in 1972 but were Filipino citizens at the time of their death;
2. Artists who have helped build a Filipino sense of nationhood through the content and form of their works;
3. Artists who have distinguished themselves by pioneering in a mode of creative expression or style, making an impact on succeeding generations of artists;
4. Artists who have created a significant body of works and/or have consistently displayed excellence in the practice of their art form, enriching artistic expression or style; and
5. Artists who enjoy broad acceptance through prestigious national and/or international recognition, Award in prestigious national and/or international events, critical acclaim and/or reviews of their works, and/or respect and esteem from peers within an artistic discipline.

Nominations are then submitted to the National Artist Secretariat which is created by the National Artist Award Committee; experts from different art fields then sit on a First Deliberation to prepare the short list of nominees. A Second Deliberation, which is a joint meeting of the Commissioners of the NCCA and the Board of Trustees of the CCP, decides on the final nominees. The list is then forwarded to the President of the Philippines, who, by Presidential Proclamation, proclaims the final nominees as members of the Order of National Artists.

== Benefits ==
- The rank and title of National Artist, as proclaimed by the President of the Philippines;
- A grand collar of the Order of National Artist and a citation;
- A lifetime emolument and material and physical benefits comparable in value to those received by the highest officers of the land such as:

1. a cash Award of one hundred thousand pesos (₱100,000.00) net of taxes, for living awardees;
2. a cash Award of seventy-five thousand pesos (₱75,000.00) net of taxes, for posthumous awardees, payable to legal heir/s;
3. a monthly life pension, medical and hospitalization benefits;
4. life insurance coverage for Awardees who are still insurable;
5. a state funeral and burial at the Libingan ng mga Bayani;
6. a place of honor, in line with protocolar precedence, at national state functions, and recognition at cultural events.

== Roster of National Artists ==
President	Year	Picture	Awardee	Province	Category	Notes
Ferdinand Marcos	1972		Fernando Amorsolo (1892–1972)	Manila	Visual Arts – Painting	posthumous conferment
Ferdinand Marcos	1973		Francisca Reyes Aquino (1899–1983)	Bulacan	Dance	
Ferdinand Marcos	1973		Botong Francisco (1912–1969)	Rizal	Visual Arts – Painting	posthumous conferment
Ferdinand Marcos	1973		Amado V. Hernández (1903–1970)	Manila	Literature	posthumous conferment
Ferdinand Marcos	1973		Antonio Molina (1894–1980)	Manila	Music	
Ferdinand Marcos	1973		Juan Nakpil (1899–1986)	Manila	Architecture	
Ferdinand Marcos	1973		Guillermo Tolentino (1890–1976)	Bulacan	Visual Arts – Sculpture	
Ferdinand Marcos	1973		Jose Garcia Villa (1908–1997)	Manila	Literature	
Ferdinand Marcos	1976		Napoleon Abueva (1930–2018)	Bohol	Visual Arts – Sculpture	
Ferdinand Marcos	1976		Leonor Orosa-Goquingco (1917–2005)	Batangas	Dance	
Ferdinand Marcos	1976		Lamberto V. Avellana (1915–1991)	Mountain Province	Film and Theater	
Ferdinand Marcos	1976		Nick Joaquin (1917–2004)	Manila	Literature	
Ferdinand Marcos	1976		Jovita Fuentes (1895–1978)	Capiz	Music	
Ferdinand Marcos	1976		Victorio C. Edades (1895–1985)	Pangasinan	Visual Arts – Painting	
Ferdinand Marcos	1976		Pablo Antonio (1901–1975)	Manila	Architecture	posthumous conferment
Ferdinand Marcos	1981		Vicente Manansala (1910–1981)	Pampanga	Visual Arts – Painting	posthumous conferment
Ferdinand Marcos	1982		Gerardo de León (1913–1981)	Manila	Film	posthumous conferment
Ferdinand Marcos	1982		Carlos P. Romulo (1898–1985)	Tarlac	Literature	
Corazon Aquino	1987	Dalagang Bukid sarsuwela (cropped)	Atang de la Rama (1902–1991)	Manila	Theater and Music	
Corazon Aquino	1988		Antonino Buenaventura (1904–1996)	Bulacan	Music	
Corazon Aquino	1988		Lucrecia Reyes Urtula (1929–1999)	Iloilo	Dance	
Corazon Aquino	1989		Lucrecia Roces Kasilag (1918–2008)	La Union	Music	
Corazon Aquino	1990		Zacarias Francisco "Franz" Quino Arcellana (1916–2002)	Manila	Literature	
Corazon Aquino	1990		Cesar Legaspi (1917–1994)	Manila	Visual Arts – Painting	
Corazon Aquino	1990		Leandro Locsin (1928–1994)	Negros Occidental	Architecture	
Corazon Aquino	1991		Hernando R. Ocampo (1911–1978)	Manila	Visual Arts – Painting	posthumous conferment
Corazon Aquino	1991		Lucio D. San Pedro (1913–2002)	Rizal	Music	
Fidel V. Ramos	1997		Lino Brocka (1939–1991)	Sorsogon	Film	posthumous conferment
Fidel V. Ramos	1997		Felipe Padilla de Leon (1912–1992)	Nueva Ecija	Music	posthumous conferment
Fidel V. Ramos	1997		Wilfrido Ma. Guerrero (1911–1995)	Manila	Theater	posthumous conferment
Fidel V. Ramos	1997		Rolando Santos Tinio (1937–1997)	Manila	Theater and Literature	posthumous conferment
Fidel V. Ramos	1997		N. V. M. Gonzalez (1915–1999)	Romblon	Literature	
Fidel V. Ramos	1997		Levi Celerio (1910–2002)	Manila	Music & Literature	
Fidel V. Ramos	1997		Arturo R. Luz (1926–2021)	Manila	Visual Arts – Painting	
Fidel V. Ramos	1997		José Maceda (1917–2004)	Manila and Laguna	Music	
Fidel V. Ramos	1997		Carlos Quirino (1910–1999)	Manila	Historical Literature	
Joseph Estrada	1999		Jerry Navarro Elizalde (1924–1999)	Antique	Visual Arts – Painting	posthumous conferment
Joseph Estrada	1999		Ernani Cuenco (1936–1988)	Bulacan	Music	posthumous conferment
Joseph Estrada	1999		Andrea Veneracion (1928–2013)	Manila	Music	
Joseph Estrada	1999		Edith L. Tiempo (1919–2011)	Nueva Vizcaya and Negros Oriental	Literature	
Joseph Estrada	1999		Daisy Avellana (1917–2013)	Capiz	Theater	
Gloria Macapagal Arroyo	2001		Ishmael Bernal (1938–1996)	Manila	Film	posthumous conferment
Gloria Macapagal Arroyo	2001		Severino Montano (1915–1980)	Ilocos Norte	Theater	posthumous conferment
Gloria Macapagal Arroyo	2001		F. Sionil Jose (1924–2022)	Pangasinan	Literature	
Gloria Macapagal Arroyo	2001		Ang Kiukok (1931–2005)	Davao del Sur	Visual Arts – Painting	
Gloria Macapagal Arroyo	2003		Jose T. Joya (1931–1995)	Manila	Visual Arts – Painting	posthumous conferment
Gloria Macapagal Arroyo	2003		Virgilio Almario (b. 1944)	Bulacan	Literature	
Gloria Macapagal Arroyo	2003		Alejandro R. Roces (1924–2011)	Manila	Literature	
Gloria Macapagal Arroyo	2003		Eddie S. Romero (1924–2013)	Negros Oriental	Film and Broadcast Arts	
Gloria Macapagal Arroyo	2003		Salvador Bernal (1945–2011)	Pangasinan	Theater and Design	
Gloria Macapagal Arroyo	2006		BenCab (b. 1942)	Manila	Visual Arts – Painting	
Gloria Macapagal Arroyo	2006		Abdulmari Imao (1936–2014)	Sulu	Visual Arts – Sculpture	
Gloria Macapagal Arroyo	2006		Bienvenido Lumbera (1932–2021)	Batangas	Literature	
Gloria Macapagal Arroyo	2006		Ramon Obusan (1938–2006)	Albay	Dance	
Gloria Macapagal Arroyo	2006		Ildefonso P. Santos Jr. (1929–2014)	Manila	Architecture – Landscape	
Gloria Macapagal Arroyo	2006		Fernando Poe Jr.^{1} (1939–2004)	Manila	Film	posthumous conferment
Gloria Macapagal Arroyo	2006		Ramón Valera (1912–1972)	Abra	Fashion Design	posthumous conferment
Gloria Macapagal Arroyo	2009^{2}		Manuel Conde (Manuel Conde) (1915–1985)	Camarines Norte	Film and Broadcast Arts	posthumous conferment
Gloria Macapagal Arroyo	2009^{2}		Lázaro Francisco (1898–1980)	Bataan	Literature	posthumous conferment
Gloria Macapagal Arroyo	2009^{2}		Federico Aguilar Alcuaz (1932–2011)	Manila	Visual Arts – Painting, Sculpture and Mixed Media	posthumous conferment
Benigno Aquino III	2014		Alice García Reyes van Doorn (b. 1942)	Manila	Dance	
Benigno Aquino III	2014		Francisco Coching (1919–1998)	Manila	Visual Arts	posthumous conferment
Benigno Aquino III	2014		Cirilo F. Bautista (1941–2018)	Manila	Literature	
Benigno Aquino III	2014		Francisco Espíritu Feliciano (1941–2014)	Rizal	Music	posthumous conferment
Benigno Aquino III	2014		Ramon Santos (b. 1941)	Manila	Music	
Benigno Aquino III	2014		José María Zaragoza (1912–1994)	Manila	Architecture	posthumous conferment
Rodrigo Duterte	2018		Ryan Cayabyab (b. 1954)	Manila	Music	
Rodrigo Duterte	2018		Francisco Mañosa (1931–2019)	Manila	Architecture and Allied Arts	
Rodrigo Duterte	2018		Ramon Muzones (1913–1992)	Iloilo	Literature	posthumous conferment
Rodrigo Duterte	2018		Resil Mojares (1943–2026)	Cebu and Zamboanga del Norte	Literature	
Rodrigo Duterte	2018		Lauro "Larry" Zarate Alcala (1926–2002)	Albay	Visual Arts	posthumous conferment
Rodrigo Duterte	2018		Amelia Lapeña Bonifacio (1930–2020)	Manila	Theater	
Rodrigo Duterte	2018		Kidlat Tahimik (b. 1942)	Benguet	Film and Broadcast Arts	
Rodrigo Duterte	2022		Nora Aunor (1953–2025)	Camarines Sur	Film and Broadcast Arts	
Rodrigo Duterte	2022		Agnes Locsin (b. 1957)	Davao	Dance	
Rodrigo Duterte	2022		Fides Cuyugan-Asensio (b. 1931)	Quezon	Music	
Rodrigo Duterte	2022		Ricky Lee (b. 1948)	Camarines Norte	Film and Broadcast Arts	
Rodrigo Duterte	2022		Gémino Abad (b. 1939)	Cebu and Manila	Literature	
Rodrigo Duterte	2022		Tony Mabesa (1935–2019)	Laguna	Theater	posthumous conferment
Rodrigo Duterte	2022		Marilou Diaz-Abaya (1955–2012)	Manila	Film and Broadcast Arts	posthumous conferment
Rodrigo Duterte	2022		Salvacion Lim-Higgins (1920–1990)	Albay	Fashion Design	posthumous conferment
Bongbong Marcos	2026		Nicanor Tiongson (b. 1946)	Bulacan	Literature	
Bongbong Marcos	2026		Gregorio Brillantes (1932–2025)	Tarlac	Literature	posthumous conferment
Bongbong Marcos	2026		Imelda Cajipe-Endaya (b. 1949)	Manila and Laguna	Visual Arts	
Bongbong Marcos	2026		Nunelucio Alvarado (b. 1950)	Negros Occidental	Visual Arts	
Bongbong Marcos	2026		Gabriel Formoso (1915–1996)	Makati	Architecture	posthumous conferment
Bongbong Marcos	2026		Nonoy Froilan (b. 1950)	Samar	Dance	
Bongbong Marcos	2026		Patis Tesoro (b. 1950)	Iloilo and Laguna	Fashion Design	
Bongbong Marcos	2026		Bing Lao (1948–2024)	Davao City	Film and Broadcast Arts	posthumous conferment
Bongbong Marcos	2026		Teodoro Hilado (1938–2015)	Negros Occidental	Theater	posthumous conferment
Bongbong Marcos	2026		Alfredo Buenaventura (b. 1929)	Bulacan	Music	

^1In May 2006, under the Arroyo administration, the National Commission on Culture and the Arts (NCCA) already conferred the award to Poe but the late actor's wife, Susan Roces refused to acknowledge it. President Aquino has approved and signed Proclamation 435 affirming the previous proclamation of former President Gloria Macapagal-Arroyo declaring the late movie icon Fernando Poe Jr. a National Artist, posthumously. The Poe family finally accepted the conferment on 16 August 2012.

^2Aguilar Alcuaz, Francisco, and Conde were all proclaimed in 2009 but the conferment of the order was delayed due to a controversy. The order was finally bestowed in a ceremony at Malacañang Palace in November 2013.

- Music
  - Levi Celério
  - Ernani Joson Cuenco
  - Felipe Padilla de León
  - Francisco Feliciano
  - Lucrecia R. Kasilag
  - José Maceda
  - Antonio J. Molina
  - Lucio D. San Pedro
  - Ramón Santos
  - Andrea O. Veneración
  - Antonino R. Buenaventura
  - Jovita Fuentes
  - Ryan Cayabyab
  - Fides Cuyugan-Asensio
  - Alfredo S. Buenaventura
- Dance
  - Francisca Reyes Aquino
  - Leonor Orosa-Goquingco
  - Ramón Obusan
  - Alice Reyes
  - Lucrecia Reyes Urtula
  - Agnes Locsin
  - Nonoy Froilan
- Theater
  - Daisy Avellana
  - Atang de la Rama
  - Rolando S. Tínio
  - Salvador F. Bernál (Set Design)
  - Lamberto V. Avellana
  - Wilfrido Ma. Guerrero
  - Severino Montano
  - Amelia Lapeña-Bonifacio
  - Tony Mabesa
  - Teodoro Hilado
- Architecture
  - Pablo Antonio (Architecture)
  - Juan Nakpíl (Architecture)
  - Leandro V. Locsín (Architecture)
  - Francisco Mañosa (Architecture)
  - I. P. Santos (Architecture)
  - José María Zaragoza (Architecture)
  - Gabriel Formoso (Architecture)
- Fashion Design
  - Ramón Valera (Fashion Design)
  - Salvacion Lim-Higgins (Fashion Design)
  - Maria Beatriz Tesoro
- Historical Literature
  - Carlos Quirino
- Visual Arts
  - Napoleón V. Abueva (Sculpture)
  - Larry Alcala (Comics)
  - Fernando C. Amorsolo (Painting)
  - Benedicto "BenCab" Reyes Cabrera (Painting)
  - Francisco Coching (Comics)
  - Victorio C. Edades (Painting)
  - Carlos "Botong" V. Francisco (Painting)
  - Abdulmari Asia Imao (Sculpture)
  - Jose T. Joya (Painting)
  - Ang Kiukok (Painting)
  - César Legaspi (Painting)
  - Arturo R. Luz (Painting)
  - Vicente S. Manansala (Painting)
  - J. Navarro Elizalde (Painting)
  - Hernándo R. Ocampo (Painting)
  - Guillermo E. Tolentino (Sculpture)
  - Federico Aguilar Alcuáz (Painting, Sculpture, and Mixed Media)
  - Nunelucio Alvarado
  - Imelda Cajipe-Endaya
- Literature
  - Francisco Arcellana
  - Virgilio S. Almario
  - Cirilo F. Bautista
  - N. V. M. Gonzalez
  - Ramon Muzones
  - Amado V. Hernández
  - Nick Joaquín
  - F. Sioníl José
  - Bienvenido Lumbera
  - Resil Mojares
  - Alejándro R. Roces
  - Carlos P. Rómulo
  - Edith L. Tiempo
  - José García Villa
  - Lázaro Francisco
  - Gemino Abad
  - Nicanor Tiongson
  - Gregorio Brillantes
- Film and Broadcast Arts
  - Lino Brocka
  - Ishmael Bernál
  - Gerardo de León
  - Eddie S. Romero
  - Fernando Poe Jr.
  - Manuel Conde
  - Kidlat Tahimik
  - Nora Aunor
  - Marilou Diaz-Abaya
  - Ricky Lee
  - Armando Lao

== Nominations ==
Since the establishment in 1972 of the order for artists who have contributed largely in their respective fields, government and non-government cultural organizations and educational institutes have nominated candidates deemed eligible and worthy of such recognition. Unfortunately, the Cultural Center of the Philippines and the National Commission for Culture and the Arts does not reveal their deliberations and list of candidates received.

The following list features noted personalities nominated for their respective fields:

- Music
  - Alfredo Buenaventura (1942–1982)
  - Contancio De Guzman (1903–1982)
  - Eliseo Pajaro (1915–1984)
  - Emiliano Cruz (1916–1986)
  - Redentor Romero (1929–2001)
  - Katy de la Cruz (1907–2004)
  - George Canseco (1934–2004)
  - Carmencita Lozada (1940–2006)
  - Yoyoy Villame (1932–2007)
  - Emil Mijares (1935–2007)
  - Eduardo Hontiveros (1923–2008)
  - Francis Magalona (1964–2009)
  - Fred Panopio (1939–2010)
  - Ricardo Zamora (1926–2011)
  - Josefino Cenizal (1919–2015)
  - Rico Puno (1953–2018)
  - Heber Bartolome (1948–2021)
  - Sylvia La Torre (1933–2022)
  - Rudy Villanueva (1940–2024)
  - Gilopez Kabayao (1929–2024)
  - Pilita Corrales (1939–2025)
  - Freddie Aguilar (1953–2025)
  - Max Surban (1939–)
  - Jose Mari Chan (1945–)
  - Eva Eugenio (1946–)
  - Raul Sunico (1948–)
  - Joey Ayala (1956–)
  - Imelda Papin (1956–)
  - Cecile Licad (1961–)
  - Manuel Francisco (1965–)
  - Grace Nono (1965–)
  - Mark Anthony Carpio (1968–)
  - Regine Velasquez (1970–)
  - Lea Salonga (1971–)
  - Gerard Salonga (1973–)
  - Asin (band formed in 1976)
- Dance
  - Carmen Dakudao Locsin (1918–2005)
  - Paz Cielo Belmonte (1916–2013)
  - Rosalia Merino Santos (1923–2021)
  - Teresita Veloso Pil (1926–)
  - Corazon Generoso-Iñigo (1930–)
  - Eddie Elejar (1934–)
  - Felicitas Radaic (1937–)
  - Ligaya Fernando-Amilbangsa (1943–)
  - Shirley Halili-Cruz (1959–)
  - Lisa Macuja-Elizalde (1964–)
- Theater
  - Pio Kabahar (1892–1977)
  - Bienvenido Noriega Jr. (1952–1994)
  - Zenaida Amador (1933–2008)
  - Naty Crame-Rogers (1922–2021)
  - Rustica Carpio (1930–2022)
  - Floy Quintos (1961–2024)
  - Onofre Pagsanghan (1927–)
  - Cecile Guidote-Alvarez (1943–)
  - Celeste Legaspi (1950–)
  - Rody Vera (1960–)
  - Menchu Lauchengco-Yulo (1963–)
  - Lea Salonga (1971–)
- Film and Broadcast Arts
  - Helen Vela (1946–1992)
  - Charito Solis (1935–1998)
  - Leopoldo Salcedo (1912–1998)
  - Francisco Trinidad (1915–2001)
  - Nida Blanca (1936–2001)
  - Nenita Cortes-Daluz (1938–2007)
  - Rudy Fernandez (1952–2008)
  - Fidela Magpayo (1920–2008)
  - Tita Muñoz (1927–2009)
  - Paquito Diaz (1937–2011)
  - Mario O'Hara (1946–2012)
  - Dolphy Quizon (1928–2012)
  - Celso Castillo (1943–2012)
  - Bella Flores (1929–2013)
  - Eddie Garcia (1929–2019)
  - Julian Daan (1945–2019)
  - Peque Gallaga (1943–2020)
  - Anita Linda (1924–2020)
  - Ramon Revilla Sr. (1927–2020)
  - Susan Roces (1941–2022)
  - Gloria Sevilla (1932–2022)
  - Mike Enriquez (1951–2023)
  - Jaclyn Jose (1963–2024)
  - Gloria Romero (1933–2025)
  - Mike de Leon (1947–2025)
  - Rosa Rosal (1928–2025)
  - Joonee Gamboa (1936–)
  - Cheche Lazaro (1945–)
  - Gina Pareño (1949–)
  - Joel Lamangan (1952–)
  - Vilma Santos (1953–)
  - Chito Roño (1954–)
  - Christopher de Leon (1956–)
  - Lav Diaz (1958–)
  - Nick Deocampo (1959–)
  - Brillante Mendoza (1960–)
  - Dolly de Leon (1960–)
  - Jessica Soho (1964–)
  - Eugene Domingo (1971–)
  - Atom Araullo (1982–)
- Visual Arts – Painting and Sculpture
  - Diosdado Lorenzo (1906–1984)
  - Alfredo Carmelo (1896–1985)
  - Martino Abellana (1914–1988)
  - Juan Flores (1900–1992)
  - Onib Olmedo (1937–1996)
  - Tony Velasquez (1910–1997)
  - Paco Gorospe (1939–2002)
  - Nonoy Marcelo (1939–2002)
  - Honesto Vitug (1908–2003)
  - Pacita Abad (1946–2004)
  - Rene Villanueva (1954–2007)
  - Anita Magsaysay-Ho (1914–2012)
  - Romeo Tabuena (1921–2015)
  - Nestor Leynes (1922–2016)
  - Eduardo Castrillo (1942–2016)
  - Rafael Pacheco (1933–2017)
  - Manuel Rodriguez Sr. (1912–2017)
  - Malang Santos (1928–2017)
  - Ben Hur Villanueva (1938–2018)
  - Rey Paz Contreras (1950–2021)
  - Rene Robles (1950–2021)
  - Rameer Tawasil (1969–2023)
  - Alfredo Perez (1947–2024)
  - Rosario Bitanga-Peralta (1934–2024)
  - Araceli Limcaco-Dans (1929–2024)
  - Brenda Fajardo (1940–2024)
  - Carlo Caparas (1958–2024)
  - Romeo Carlos (1945–2025)
  - Juvenal Sanso (1929–2025)
  - Danilo Dalena (1942–)
  - Luis Enano Yee Jr. (1942–)
  - Raul Sunico (1943–)
  - Ramon Orlina (1944–)
  - Manuel Baldemor (1947–)
  - Nemesio Miranda (1949–)
  - Fil Delacruz (1950–)
  - Rene Robles (1950–)
  - Willy Tayug (1959–)
  - Celeste Lecaroz (1971–)
  - Kublai Millan (1974–)
- Literature
  - Iñigo Edgardo Regalado (1888–1976)
  - Magdalena Jalandoni (1891–1978)
  - Leon Maria Guerrero (1915–1982)
  - Teodoro Agoncillo (1912–1985)
  - Gregorio Zaide (1907–1985)
  - Angela Manalang-Gloria (1907–1995)
  - Bienvenido Santos (1911–1996)
  - Edilberto K. Tiempo (1913–1996)
  - Liwayway Arceo (1924–1999)
  - Doreen Fernandez (1934–2002)
  - Wilfredo Nolledo (1933–2004)
  - Adrian Cristobal (1932–2007)
  - Loreto Paras-Sulit (1908–2008)
  - Genoveva Matute (1915–2009)
  - Ophelia Dimalanta (1932–2010)
  - Kerima Polotan Tuvera (1925–2011)
  - Azucena Grajo Uranza (1929–2012)
  - Sy Yinchow (1919–2014)
  - Emerita Quito (1926–2017)
  - Carmen Guerrero Nakpil (1922–2018)
  - Leoncio Deriada (1938–2019)
  - Gilda Cordero-Fernando (1930–2020)
  - Domingo Landicho (1939–2021)
  - Lualhati Bautista (1945–2023)
  - Rudy Villanueva (1940–2024)
  - Greg Brillantes (1932–2025)
  - Zeus Salazar (1934–)
  - Jose Bragado (1936–)
  - Juan Hidalgo Jr. (1936–)
  - Nicanor Tiongson (1946–)
  - Merlie Alunan (1943–)
  - Isagani Cruz (1945–)
  - Marjorie Evasco (1953–)
  - Jose Dalisay Jr. (1954–)
  - Ambeth Ocampo (1961–)
  - Gina Apostol (1963–)
- Architecture
  - Fernando Ocampo (1897–1984)
  - Carlos Santos-Viola (1912–1994)
  - Felipe Mendoza (1917–2000)
  - Cesar Concio (1907–2003)
  - Carlos Arguelles (1917–2008)
  - Aida Cruz-Del Rosario (1922–2024)
  - Lor Calma (1928–2026)
  - Felino Palafox (1950–)
- Fashion Design
  - Joe Salazar (1944–2004)
  - Aureo Alonzo (1928–2014)
  - Pitoy Moreno (1925–2018)
  - Ben Farrales (1932–2021)
  - Auggie Cordero (1944–2022)
  - Christian Espiritu (1934–2023)
  - Inno Sotto (1969–)
  - Dennis Lustico (1970–)
  - Michael Cinco (1971–)
  - Puey Quiñones (1980–)

== 2009 selection controversy ==
In August 2009, the conferment of the Order of National Artists on seven individuals by President Gloria Macapagal Arroyo became controversial when it was revealed that musician Ramon Santos had been dropped from the list of nominees short-listed in May that year by the selection committee, and that four other individuals had been nominated via "President's prerogative": Cecile Guidote-Alvarez (Theater), Carlo J. Caparas (Visual Arts and Film), Francisco Mañosa (Architecture), and Pitoy Moreno (Fashion Design).

Members of the Philippine art community–including a number of living members of the Order–protested that the proclamation politicised the title of National Artist, and made it "a way for President Gloria Macapagal-Arroyo to accommodate her allies." Specific protests were raised regarding the nomination of Guidote-Alvarez, who was also executive director of the National Commission for Culture and the Arts, because it was purportedly a breach of protocol and delicadeza (propriety), and of Caparas, on the grounds that he was unqualified for nomination under both the Visual Arts and the Film categories. On July 16, 2013, the controversy finally ended after the Supreme Court of the Philippines voted 12-1-2 that voided the four proclamations.

On June 20, 2014, five years after he was originally shortlisted in 2009, Ramon Santos was finally conferred National Artist for Music by President Benigno S. Aquino III.

== See also ==
- Art of the Philippines
- Culture of the Philippines
- National Living Treasures Award (Philippines)
- Tourism in the Philippines
