= Lucrecia Reyes Urtula =

Filipina choreographer

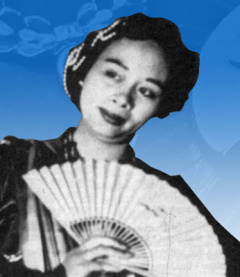
- Lucrecia Reyes-Urtula from the Order of National Artists (NCCA)
- Born: Lucrecia Faustino Reyes; June 29, 1929; Iloilo, Insular Government of the Philippine Islands
- Died: August 4, 1999 (aged 70); Manila, Philippines
- Occupation(s): Choreographer, theater director, teacher, author, researcher
- Awards: Order of National Artists of the Philippines

Lucrecia Faustino Reyes-Urtula (June 29, 1929 – August 4, 1999) was a Filipino choreographer, theater director, teacher, author and researcher on ethnic dance. She was the founding director of the Bayanihan Philippine National Folk Dance Company and was named National Artist of the Philippines for dance in 1988.

She worked to translate folk dancing into the realm of theater. She adapted indigenous dance traditions to the demands of the modern stage, and performances of her works received international attention.

== Early life ==
Born in Iloilo, Reyes was the daughter of Antonia Faustino, a nurse, and Col. Leon S. Reyes of the Philippine Constabulary (PC), who later served as a brigadier general and a military governor. She grew up amidst music and dance. Her mother's family included many musicians and her musician father could play many instruments. He was a regular participant at fiestas and special occasions in his hometown of Calamba.

Reyes' father was an ardent lover of folk and ethnic art. Due to the demands of his military career, the family moved frequently and was consecutively assigned to Iloilo, Jolo, Kalibo, Capiz, Surigao, Dumaguete, Bacolod, Negros Oriental, Cotabato, Cagayan de Oro, Misamis Oriental, Lanao and Mountain Province. Reyes learned to appreciate the distinct cultures of the various ethnic groups and was an active participant in the celebrations of festivals and rituals. Against this backdrop, Reyes developed an enduring interest in the arts, music and dance.

While in Baguio, Reyes enrolled in a ballet class run by a Russian immigrant. She later obtained a degree in Education, specializing in Physical Education. She was asked by Francisca Reyes-Aquino, a pioneer in the revival of folk dance, to assist in documenting folk dances.

== Career ==
Upon graduation, she taught at her alma mater, the Philippine Women's University. During this period, Reyes worked to collect and document tribal and ethnic dances, which she believed were a great cultural treasure waiting to be tapped and adapted to the stage. She used her knowledge of choreography and creative touch to transform these tribal dances into stage performances. At PWU she organized the Filipino Folk Music and Dance Committee, which concentrated on choreographed folk dances and their performance at fiestas and special occasions.

She enrolled at San Francisco University (graduate studies in dance drama), Martha Graham School of Modern Dance at the University of California, Los Angeles (UCLA), and Hanyagi School of Dancing of Japan.

=== Performance ===
Her group, later renamed PWU Philippine Delegation of Dancers and Musicians, traveled to Dhaka, East Pakistan and to participate in the International Festival of Dance and Music from December 25, 1954, to January 7, 1955. The host in Pakistan could produce only a guitar as an accompaniment.

Reyes extended the group's repertoire and drew on native dances as a source. She compiled various Lanao and Cotabato dances, such as the dance of the slave, the dance of the warrior, and the dance of the Muslim princess called "Singkil". Her creative choreography enriched the program of her Bayanihan Dance Company as it performed at the Brussels World Exposition in 1958 and at Winter Garden in New York. Reyes earned accolades as she gave "form, substance and exciting color to what could have been simple ethnic dances," which she translated to a theatrical art. Among the widely acclaimed dances she had staged were Singkil, a Bayanihan signature number based on a Maranao epic poem; Vinta, a dance honoring Filipino sailing prowess; Tagabili, a tale of tribal conflict; Pagdiwata, a four-day harvest festival condensed into a six-minute spectacle; Salidsid, a mountain wedding dance; and Idaw, Banga and Aires de Verbena.

Bayanihan's repertoire, which had aroused the interest and admiration of both artists and art lovers, would typically ".. start with a war dance of the Mountain tribes, followed by a festival and rites in marriage, then changed in tempo with a presentation of the regal dances of Castilian colonization, later to pick up in a different setting as it portrayed Muslim dances and various regional dances of different colors and texture. All these depict the happy mixture of influences coming from Malaya, India, China, and Persia. The choreography ended with a portrayal in dance numbers of the rural life in a barrio, planting rice, harvesting, fishing and constructing a house.."

The group toured America, Europe, Asia, Australia and Africa.

== Books ==
- Philippine National Dances (1946)
- Gymnastics for Girls (1947)
- Fundamental Dance Steps and Music (1948)
- Foreign Folk Dances (1949)
- Dances for all Occasion (1950)
- Playground Demonstration (1951)
- Philippine Folk Dances, Volumes I to VI.

== International conferences and workshops ==
- Dance workshops in Sarawak and Malaysia (1986)
- UNESCO Workshop on the Preservation of Traditional Performing Arts in Modern Environment (Indonesia, 1982)
- Third Festival of Asian Arts (Hong Kong 1979)
- Workshop on Philippine Dance (Hawaii 1975)

== Awards ==
- ASEAN Tourism Association for the Best ASEAN Cultural Effort, Pattayas, Thailand (1990)
- Tandang Sora Award for the Arts (1982)
- Patnubay ng Sining at Kalinangan Award from the City of Man ila (1973)
- International Women's Award in UNAP's Women of Distinction (1963)
- Republic Cultural Heritage Award for Research in Folk Dance (1963)
- Conferred a title, "Bai Kiokmay" (means, most active princess in the Arts)) in a ritual performed by the Mandaya tribe of Davao, attended by the tribes of Agusan participated in by 16 datus. (1963)
