= Alfredo Pérez =

Alfredo Pérez may refer to:

- Alfredo Pérez (boxer) (born 1952), retired Venezuelan boxer
- Alfredo Pérez (fencer) (born 1972), Venezuelan fencer
- Alfredo Pérez (footballer) (1929–1994), Argentine football defender
- Alfredo Perez (tennis) (born 1997), Cuban-born American tennis player
- Alfredo S. Perez (1947–2024), Filipino painter
