= Agnes Locsin =

Filipino dance choreographer

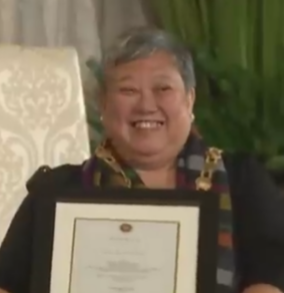
- Locsin in 2022
- Born: September 28, 1957 (age 68); Davao City, Philippines
- Occupation: Dance choreographer
- Years active: 1970s–present
- Known for: Neo-ethnic choreography
- Notable work: Encantada, La Revolucion Filipina, Igorot
- Awards: Order of National Artists of the Philippines

Agnes Dakudao Locsin (born September 28, 1957) is a Filipino dance choreographer who is recognized as a National Artist of the Philippines.

== Early life and education ==
Agnes Dakudao Locsin was born in Davao City on September 28, 1957. Her mother is Carmen Dakudao Locsin who founded the Locsin Dance Workshop in her hometown.

She attended the Philippine Women's University for her elementary and high school studies. For her collegiate studies, she entered Ateneo de Davao University where she earned her bachelor's degree in English. She also went to the United States where she studied at the Ohio State University (OSU) to obtain a master's degree in dance.

== Career ==
Locsin as an Ateneo de Davao student in the late 1970s, collaborated with artists Joey Ayala and Al Santos for the rock opera, Sa Bundok ng Apo, as a choreographer for Ayala's music and Santos' lyrics. They would collaborate again in Encantada.

She is known for developing the "neo-ethnic" Filipino dance choreography which is done by "blending indigenous themes with Western classical and modern techniques". Among the works where she applied this choreography are Encantada, La Revolucion Filipina, Sayaw, Sabel and the four-part Alay sa Puno series.

After graduating from OSU, she became the artistic director of the Locsin Dance Workshop which was founded by her mother. She was also part of the faculty of the University of the Philippines Dance Program and the artistic director of the Ballet Philippines in the Cultural Center of the Philippines complex from 1989 to 1999.

Around the 2010s, she began doing choreography for environmentally-themed works such as Agila and the Puno series.

== Awards and recognitions ==
Locsin has received various awards for her works and contribution to choreography in general. She was conferred the Gawad CCP Award Para sa Sining in 2013, the Alfonso T. Ongpin Prize for Best Book on Arts for her book Neo-ethnic Choreography: A Creative Process and the Gador Award from the Cultural Center of the Philippines. The Davao City government also gave her the Datu Bago award for her contribution to dance and culture.

Her alma mater Ateneo de Davao University nominated her for her recognition as a National Artist of the Philippines, a move which was supported by the Davao City Council. Locsin was recognized as such in June 2022.

== Personal life ==
In late-2015, Locsin was diagnosed with stage 1 breast cancer and went through a series of medication which left her almost immobilized.
