= Nunelucio Alvarado =

Filipino visual artist (born 1950)

- Born: May 5, 1950 (age 76); Fabrica, Sagay, Negros Occidental, Philippines
- Other names: Nune Alvarado; Maestro Nune
- Education: University of the Philippines Diliman; La Consolacion College Bacolod
- Known for: Painting, drawing, community art
- Movement: Social realism
- Awards: Order of National Artists of the Philippines (2026); CCP Thirteen Artists Award (1992)

Nunelucio M. Alvarado (born May 5, 1950), professionally known as Nune Alvarado and sometimes called Maestro Nune, is a Filipino social-realist painter and community arts organizer from Negros Occidental. His work is associated particularly with depictions of sugar-plantation workers, poverty and social inequality in Negros, using bold colours and strongly delineated human figures.

In September 2026, President Bongbong Marcos proclaimed Alvarado a National Artist of the Philippines for Visual Arts under Proclamation No. 1414, series of 2026.

== Early life and education ==
Alvarado was born on May 5, 1950, in Barangay Fabrica in Sagay, Negros Occidental. His father worked as a sign painter, while his mother operated a roadside canteen. Alvarado lost his parents while young, and his experience of poverty and violence in the sugar-producing communities of Negros later influenced his artistic subjects.

In 1969, Alvarado entered the College of Fine Arts at the University of the Philippines Diliman as a scholar. He remained there for one semester before returning to Negros. He subsequently studied advertising at the School of Architecture and Fine Arts of La Consolacion College in Bacolod.

== Career ==
=== Social-realist practice ===
Alvarado became involved with politically engaged artists and cultural organizations in Negros. Along with paintings, he produced posters, comics and cartoons intended to communicate social and political issues to a broad audience.

A recurring subject of his work is the sakada, or seasonal sugarcane worker. His paintings depict laborers and their families through angular or monumental figures, broad shoulders, large eyes, forceful outlines and saturated colours. Sugarcane frequently functions as a symbol: its stalks appear as crosses, nails, thorns, spears or instruments of punishment, representing the relationship between plantation labor and exploitation.

Although his paintings address hunger, dispossession and inequality, writers have also noted their emphasis on the dignity and endurance of their subjects.

=== Artists' organizations and community work ===
During the 1980s, Alvarado helped establish Pamilya Pintura, a collective of artists in Negros. In 1986, he co-founded Black Artists in Asia, an organization of artists concerned with social issues and the cultural life of the Visayas. The organization later helped establish the Visayan Islands Visual Arts Exhibition and Conference, commonly known as VIVA ExCon.

Alvarado also organized community-based art initiatives, including Pintor Kulapol and Syano Artlink. Through these groups, he mentored younger artists and involved residents in painting, film, performance and environmental projects.

=== Exhibitions ===
Alvarado represented the Philippines at the Asia Pacific Triennial of Contemporary Art in Brisbane in 1993. His work has also been exhibited in Japan, Singapore, Australia and the United States.

In 2014, Ysobel Art Gallery presented his exhibition Panik, which addressed urban disorder, materialism and the social effects of Typhoon Haiyan. The exhibition included pen-and-ink works and paintings employing fractured, Cubist-influenced forms.

== Selected works ==
Among Alvarado's documented works are:

- Masskara Queen (1988)
- Hulat Sweldo (1994)
- Ginsugdan nga Waay Katapusan (1994)
- Ang Lagare ni Kumpare (1997)
- Urban Poor (1999)

Ang Lagare ni Kumpare and Urban Poor received grand prizes at the Philip Morris Philippine Art Awards in 1997 and 1999, respectively.

== Awards and recognition ==
- 2025 Order of National Artists of the Philippines
