= Carlos Quirino =

Filipino historian

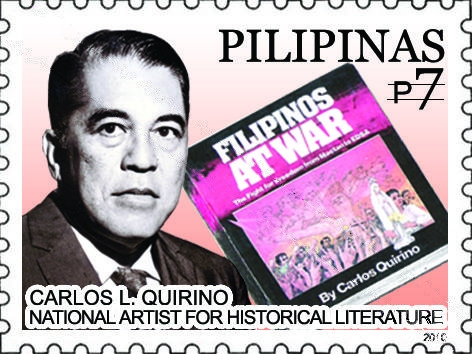
- Carlos Quirino on a 2010 stamp of the Philippines
- Born: Carlos Felix Lozada Quirino; January 14, 1910; Manila, Philippine Islands
- Died: May 20, 1999 (aged 89)
- Resting place: Libingan ng mga Bayani, Taguig
- Occupations: biographer, historian, soldier
- Known for: Historical Literature; Order of National Artists of the Philippines, 1997

Carlos Felix Lozada Quirino (January 14, 1910 – May 20, 1999) was a Philippine biographer and historian. Not only known for his works on biographies and history but also on varied subjects such as the old maps of the Philippines and the culinary legacy of the country.

== Biography ==
Carlos Quirino was born on January 14, 1910, in Manila to Jose Felix Arcinas Quirino and Dolores de los Santos Lozada. He was a nephew of Philippine president Elpidio Quirino. Carlos Quirino received his journalism degree in 1931 from the University of Wisconsin at Madison.

Known for his early biography of Jose Rizal entitled "The Great Malayan" (1940), he also wrote several works on Philippine history, as well as biographies of President Manuel Quezon and the painter Damian Domingo.

Carlos Quirino joined the Philippine Army and became second lieutenant before the outbreak of World War II. During the Japanese occupation, he was forced to join the Bataan Death March but escaped and joined the underground resistance.

Carlos Quirino became director of the National Library from 1962 to 1966. He also became the first director of the Ayala Museum in 1970. He died on May 20, 1999, at the age of 89 and is buried at the Libingan ng mga Bayani.

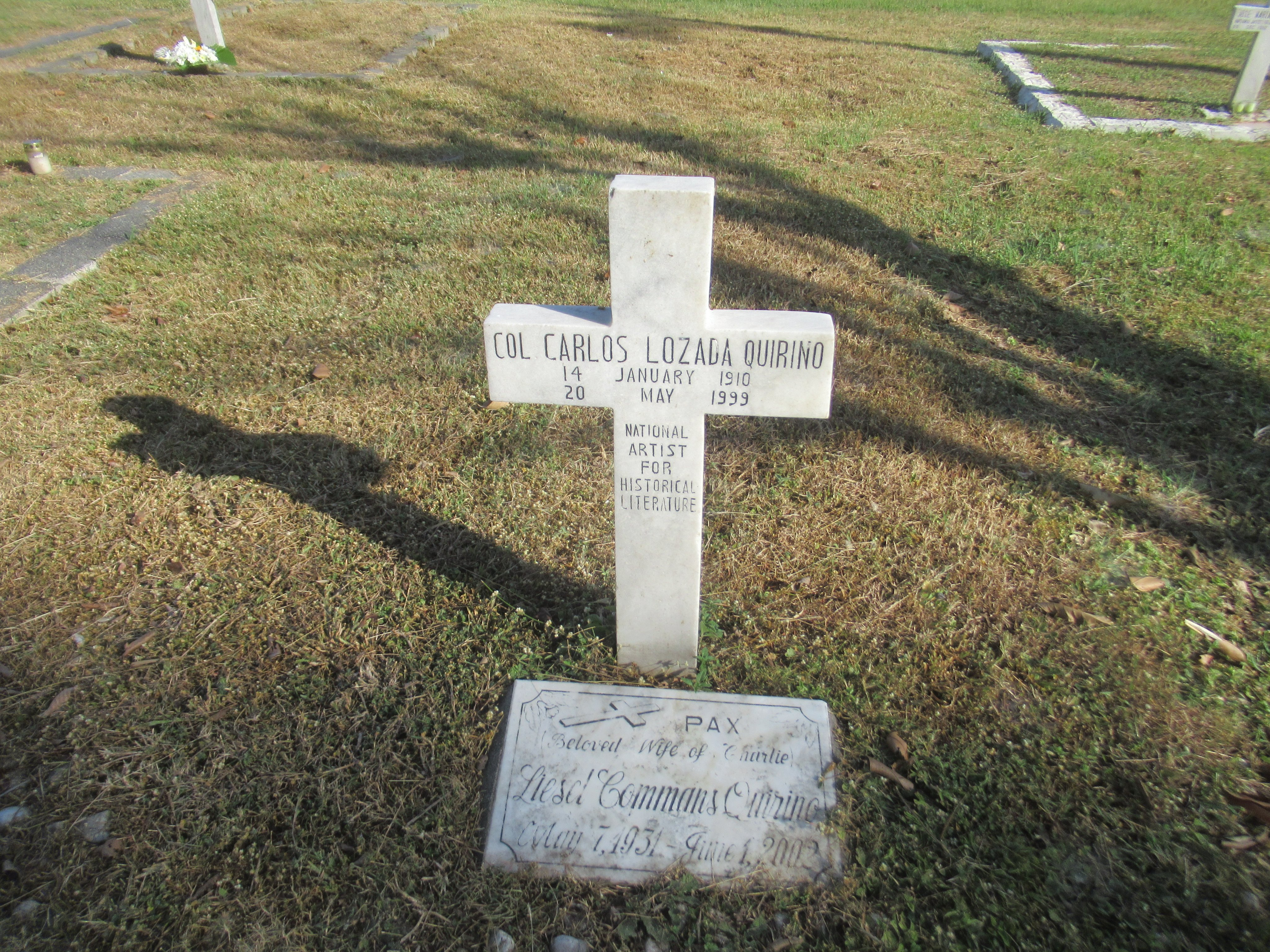
Quirino's grave at the Libingan ng mga Bayani

== Awards and honours ==
In 1997, he was recognized as a National Artist of the Philippines for Historical Literature.

== Writing style ==
Quirino's style of writing took a liberal approach of putting narrative and storytelling in his biographies. His biography of Rizal is a good example of his playful writing, which according to Gerardo P. Sicat, transformed the thoughts of Rizal and other relevant individuals, occasionally breaking them into direct conversations.

== Bibliography ==
- Man of Destiny (1935)
- The Great Malayan (1940)
- Magsaysay and the Philippines (1958)
- Philippine Cartography (1959)
- Damian Domingo: First Eminent Filipino Painter (1961)
- History of the Philippine Sugar Industry (1974)
- Filipinos at War (1981)
- Amang, the Life and Times of Eulogio Rodriguez, Sr. (1983)

Government offices
Preceded by Ernesto R. Rodriguez Jr. (OIC)	Director of the National Library of the Philippines; 1962–1966	Succeeded by Rufino Alejandro (OIC)
