= Cesar Legaspi =

National Artist, Philippines (1917–1994)

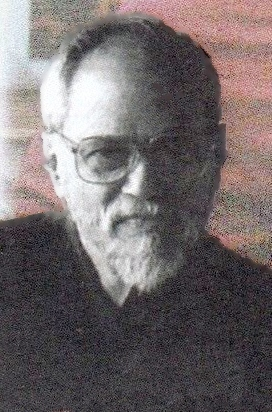
- Born: Cesar Torrente Legaspi; April 2, 1917; Tondo, Manila, Philippine Islands
- Died: April 7, 1994 (aged 77); Manila, Philippines
- Resting place: Manila Memorial Park – Sucat, Parañaque, Philippines
- Education: University of the Philippines
- Known for: Painting
- Movement: Cubism; Neorealism
- Awards: Order of National Artists of the Philippines

Cesar Torrente Legaspi (April 2, 1917 – April 7, 1994) was a Filipino National Artist in painting. He was also an art director prior to going full-time in his visual art practice in the 1960s. His early (1940s–1960s) works, alongside those of peer, Hernando Ocampo are described as depictions of anguish and dehumanization of beggars and laborers in the city. These include Man and Woman (alternatively known as Beggars) and Gadgets. Primarily because of this early period, critics have further cited Legaspi's having "reconstituted" in his paintings "cubism's unfeeling, geometric ordering of figures into a social expressionism rendered by interacting forms filled with rhythmic movement".

== Early life ==
Legaspi was born to Manuel Legaspi and Rosario Torrente in Tondo, Manila. He took up painting for one term at the University of the Philippines School of Fine Arts before he decided to take commercial art courses instead. There he received medals for perspective and illustration projects. He earned his Certificate of Proficiency in 1936, after which he continued his education in art under Pablo Amorsolo. He went to Madrid in 1953 and pursued Art Studies under a scholarship at the Cultura Hispanic until 1954. He also went to Paris to study at the Academie Ranson for one month under Henri Goetz. Back in the Philippines, he had his first one-man show at the Luz Gallery in 1963. While this led to an active phase with his major pieces, he also worked as a magazine illustrator and artistic director at an advertising agency. He finally left the agency in 1968 to focus on his painting.

== Later career ==
During his career as an artist, he had the opportunity to be part of several exhibits abroad, including the First Plastic Arts Conference in Rome in 1953, the São Paulo Biennial in Graphic Arts in 1967 and 1969, and the Wraxall Gallery in London with Filipino artists Mauro Malang Santos and Benedicto Cabrera in 1982. Apart from this, he holds the record of five retrospective exhibitions at different venues: the Museum of Philippine Art in 1978, the National Museum and the Metropolitan Museum in 1988, and the Luz Gallery and the Cultural Center of the Philippines in 1990. He was an active member of the Art Association of the Philippines and was part of the Neo-Realists. He was also the head of the Saturday Group artists from 1978 until his death on April 7, 1994.

Legaspi's major works include:

- 1945 – Man and Woman
- 1947 – Gadgets

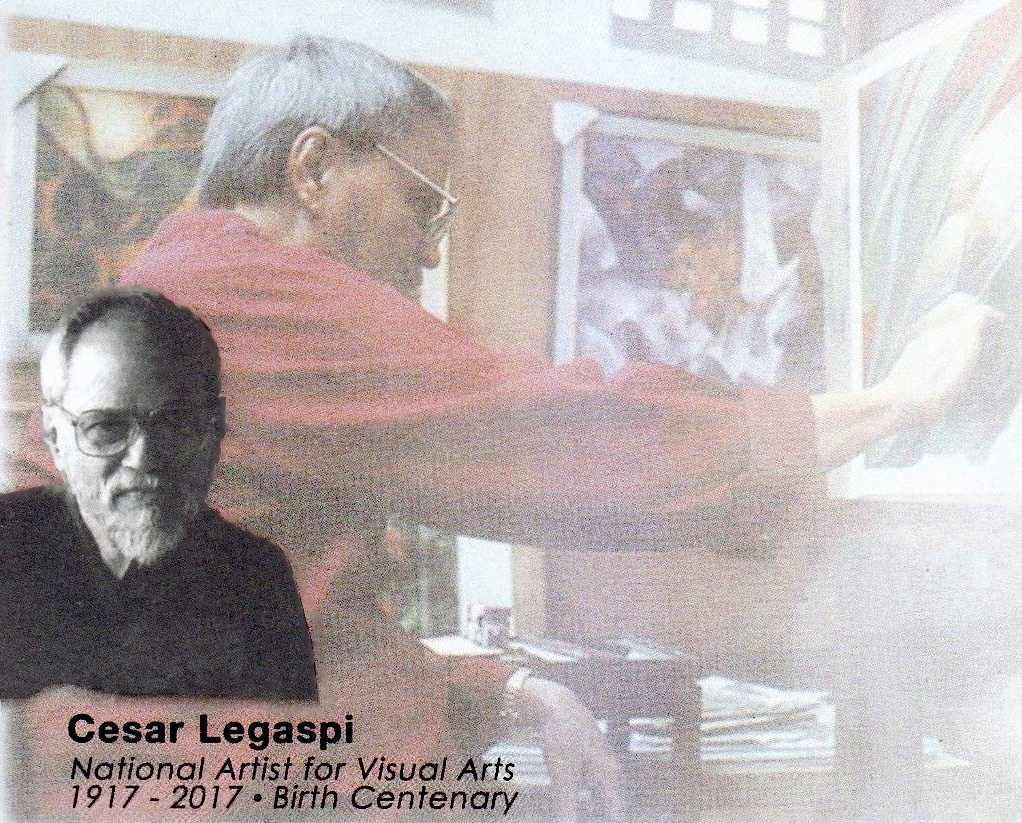

== Personal life ==
He was married to Betty/Vitaliana who kept them afloat with 5 children as he was still beginning to establish his art practice. Their children, in chronological order were Dennis, Rebecca, Maricelle/Celeste, Alicia, and Diana, the latter practiced as a lighting designer before migrating to the US. His middle daughter, Celeste Legaspi, is a singer, actress and theater-film producer.

== Death ==
At the age of 77, Cesar Legaspi died on April 7, 1994 (five days after his birthday) due to prostate cancer.

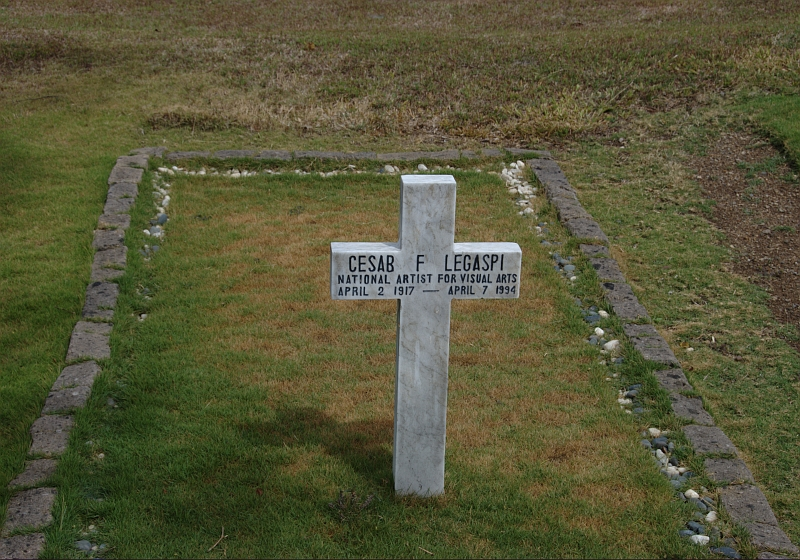
Legaspi's former Libingan ng mga Bayani grave

His remains were exhumed from the Libingan ng mga Bayani and interred in the Manila Memorial Park in Sucat, Parañaque. The Legaspi Family decided the transfer of his remains in protest of the burial of Ferdinand Marcos

== In popular culture ==
Portrayed by Ian Veneracion in the anthology series Maalaala Mo Kaya episode "Portrait" (2018).

== See also ==
- Fernando Amorsolo
- Vicente Manansala
- Art Collection of the Philippine Center, New York City
