= Francisco Arcellana =

Filipino writer (1916–2002)

- Born: Francisco Arcellana; September 6, 1916; Manila, Philippine Islands
- Died: August 1, 2002 (aged 85); Quezon City, Philippines
- Writing career
- Notable awards: Order of National Artists of the Philippines

Francisco "Franz" Arcellana (September 6, 1916 – August 1, 2002) was a Filipino writer, poet, essayist, critic, journalist and teacher.

== Biography ==
Francisco Arcellana was born on September 6, 1916. He already had ambitions of becoming a writer early in his childhood. His actual writing, however, started when he became a member of The Torres Torch Organization during his high school years. Arcellana continued writing in various school papers at the University of the Philippines Diliman. Later on he received a Rockefeller Grant and became a fellow in Creative Writing at the University of Iowa and at the Breadloaf Writers' Conference from 1956– 1957.

He is considered an important progenitor of the modern Filipino short story in English. Arcellana pioneered the development of the short story as a lyrical prose-poetic form within Filipino literature. His works are now often taught in tertiary-level syllabi in the Philippines. Many of his works were translated into Tagalog, Malaysian, Russian, Italian, and German. Arcellana won 2nd place in the 1951 Don Carlos Palanca Memorial Awards for Literature, with his short story, The Flowers of May. Fourteen of his short stories were also included in Jose Garcia Villa's Honor Roll from 1928 to 1939. His major achievements included the first award in art criticism from the Art Association of the Philippines in 1954, the Patnubay ng Sining at Kalinangan award from the city government of Manila in 1981, and the Gawad Pambansang Alagad ni Balagtas for English fiction from the Unyon ng mga Manunulat sa Pilipino (UMPIL) in 1988.

The University of the Philippines conferred upon Arcellana a doctorate in humane letters, honoris causa in 1989. Francisco Arcellana was proclaimed National Artist of the Philippines in Literature on May 23, 1990 by then Philippine President Corazon C. Aquino.

In 2009, seven years after his death, his family published a book entitled Franz to pay tribute to Arcellana. The book is a collection of essays gathered by the Arcellana family from colleagues, friends, students and family members, including fellow National Artist Nick Joaquin, Butch Dalisay, Recah Trinidad, Jing Hidalgo, Gemino Abad, Romina Gonzalez, Edwin Cordevilla, Divina Aromin, Doreen Yu, Danton Remoto, Jose Esteban Arcellana and others.

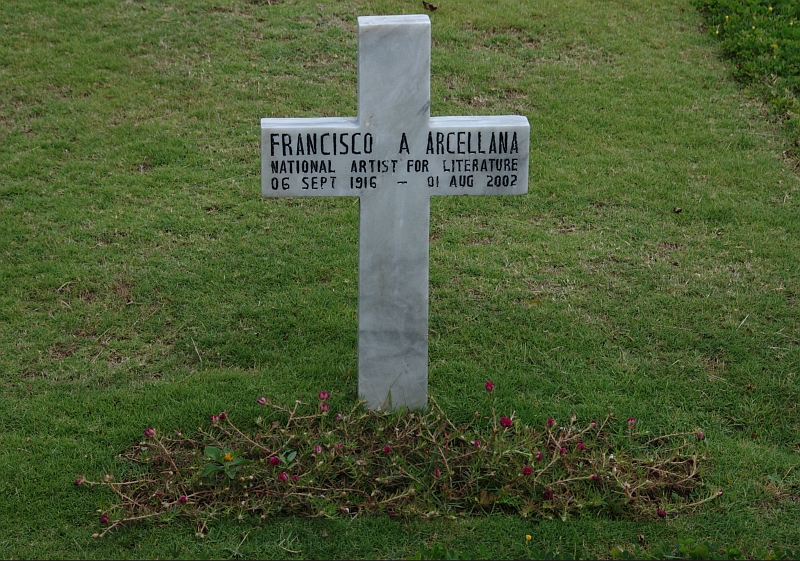
Arcellana is buried at the Libingan ng mga Bayani.

Arcellana died on August 1, 2002. As a National Artist, he received a state funeral at the Libingan ng mga Bayani.

His grandson Liam Hertzsprung performed a piano concert in 2005 dedicated to him.

== Books ==
Arcellana's published books include:

- Selected Stories (1962)
- Poetry and Politics: The State of Original Writing in English in the Philippines Today (1979)
- The Francisco Arcellana Sampler (1991).
