= Maggie Leones =

Filipino intelligence officer

Magdalena "Maggie" Leones
- Born: August 19, 1920; Lubuagan, Kalinga (province), Philippine Islands
- Died: June 16, 2016 (aged 95); Richmond, California, U.S.
- Resting place: Libingan ng mga Bayani, Metro Manila, Philippines
- Military career
- Allegiance: United States; Philippines
- Conflicts: World War II

Magdalena "Maggie" Estoista Leones (August 19, 1920 – June 16, 2016) was a Filipino intelligence officer during World War II. She is the first and only Asian woman to receive a Silver Star Medal for her wartime contributions.

== Early life ==
Leones was born in Lubuagan, Kalinga to an evangelical missionary. She served as a deaconess at the United Evangelical Church.

Leones was working as a teacher and preparing to be a nun when the Japanese invasion happened.

== World War II ==
When the church became the battalions' headquarters, Leones helped nurse wounded guerillas. At the Fall of Bataan, she refused to surrender to the Japanese regime and was therefore held captive. During that time, she studied Japanese.

When Leones was released, she witnessed an execution of 20+ young citizens. It prompted her to visit towns to see how she could help, even though travelling was prohibited at the time. She once saved Filipino evacuees from execution when she convinced Japanese troops that they came from a wedding.

Leones later proceeded to Manila to visit her missionary friends who were members of the resistance. At 22 years old, she met Colonel Russell Volckmann of the United States Armed Forces in the Philippines – North Luzon (USAFIP-NL) and agreed to become a special agent.

Leones garnered and carried intel, medical supplies and radio parts through enemy-held territories and checkpoints. She also served as a translator between Ilocano and English speakers. Her church connections and knowledge in Nihongo were advantageous in travelling and obtaining information.

Leones was credited for identifying enemy ships that arrived in San Fernando, together with its contents and respective captains. She was the mastermind for the explosion of Japanese planes on an airstrip in Tuguegarao. Leones gathered radio parts and recruited technicians which allowed consistent communication with General McArthur, and it paved the way for his return to the Philippines and the eventual reclaim of Leyte.

Leones was arrested 3 times by the Japanese government and she always managed to escape. On her last capture, she sweet-talked and bribed a guard.

Leones formally joined the Philippine army as a corporal. She was a member of the signal corps until the war ended.

== Post-war ==
Leones moved to California in 1969. She worked at Pacific Bell as a clerk and kept a low profile about her wartime ventures.

Leones's son eventually found out about his mother's wartime feats while doing research. Her grandchild once wrote a school report about her being a war hero but her teacher refused to believe it. She brought her grandmother's medal to school in order to prove.

== Death ==
Leones died on June 16, 2016, in Richmond, California. She was 95 years old.

Her body was flown to the Philippines and was buried at the Libingan ng mga Bayani (National Heroes’ Cemetery).

== Awards ==
- Silver Star Medal
- World War II Medal
- Resistance Movement Medal
- Philippine Liberation Medal
- Philippine Independence Ribbon
