= Rosalia Merino Santos =

Filipino dancer, choreographer, and educator (1923–2021)

Rosalia Merino Santos (November 7, 1923 – April 24, 2021) was a Filipino dancer, choreographer and educator. She has been called one of the pioneers in the development of modern dance in the Philippines.

The daughter of Gonzalo Merino and Enriqueta Ramos, she lived in California with her parents until she was seven. She studied ballet at the Cosmopolitan Ballet and Dancing School with Luva Adameit. When she was thirteen, she received her diploma for dance technique and became Adameit's assistant, teaching at the school. She also began training in Filipino folk dancing with Francisca Reyes-Aquino. She attended high school at the Philippine Women's University (PWU). Helena Benitez, who was the head of the physical education department at PWU, asked Santos to teach folk dance there. In 1950, she completed a BSc in physical education at PWU and continued to teach folk dance there. She also taught ballet at St. Paul College in Manila and creative dance at the Centro Escolar University.

Santos received a Fulbright Scholarship to attend the University of Wisconsin, where she studied with Margaret H'Doubler. She also was a member of Orchesis, a student dance group at the university and took classes in modern dance with Martha Graham, Louis Horst, Hanya Holm, José Limón and Charles Weidman. She was able to audit classes in composition with Doris Humphrey. In 1923, she went to Switzerland, where she pursued further studies with Harald Kreutzberg and Mary Wigman.

On her return to the Philippines, she resumed teaching. She also was a member of the Francisca Reyes-Aquino Filipiniana Dance Troupe. She married lawyer Ruben F. Santos. The couple settled in Quezon City, where she opened her own ballet studio. She began teaching dance at Far Eastern University in 1957. There she also formed the FEU Modern Experimental Dance Group.

In 1978, she was recognized by the Ballet Federation of the Philippines for her contributions as a teacher and choreographer. In 1981, she received the Patnubay ng Sining at Kalinagan Award from the city of Manila and, in 1994, the Gawad CCP para sa Sining, an arts award, for dance.

Santos died on April 24, 2021, at the age of 97.
