= Salvacion Lim Higgins =

Filipino fashion designer

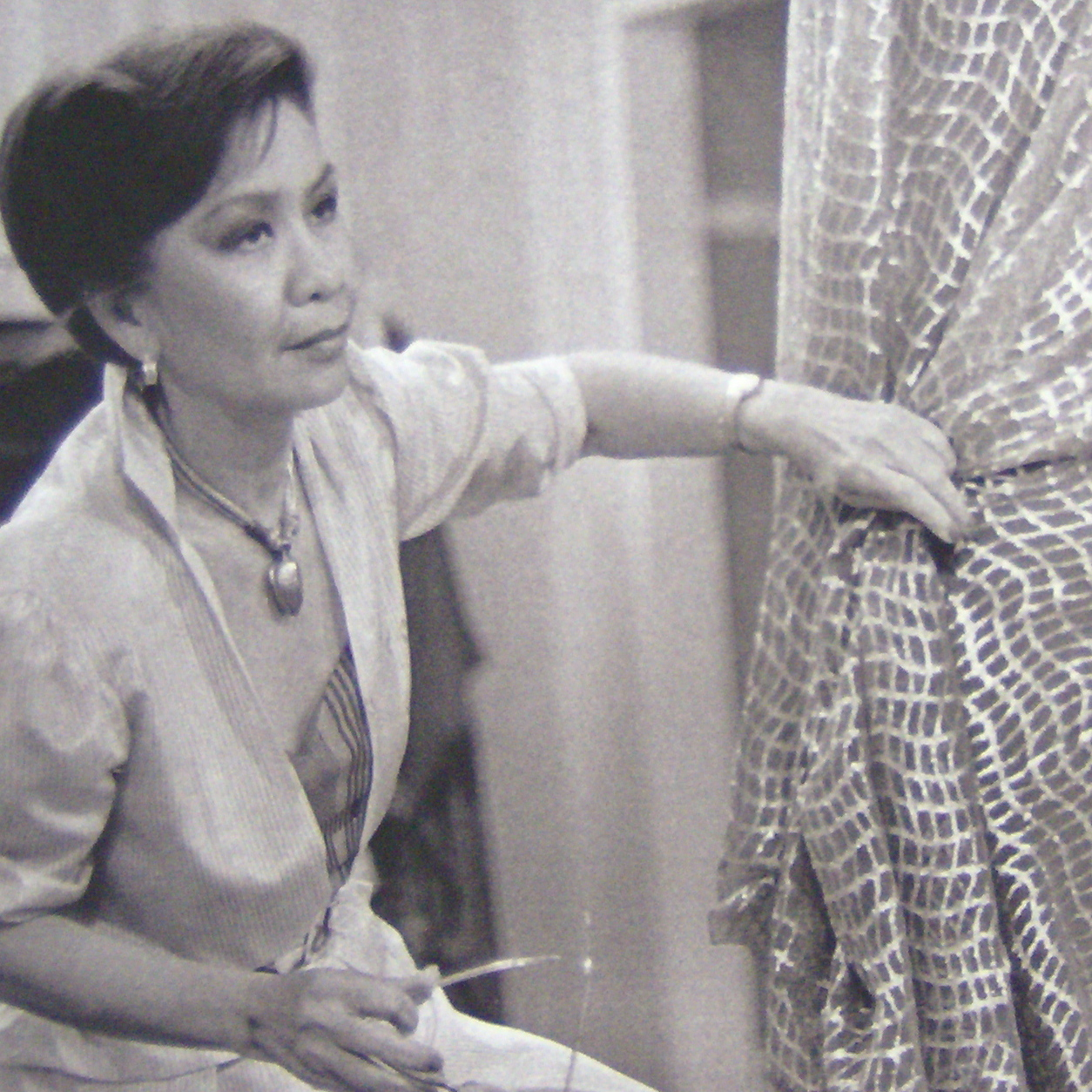
- Lim-Higgins in 1983
- Born: Salvación Lim y Díaz; January 28, 1920; Legazpi, Albay, Philippine Islands
- Died: September 15, 1990 (aged 70); San Francisco, California, U.S.
- Resting place: Manila Memorial Park – Sucat, Parañaque, Philippines
- Education: University of Santo Tomas; Traphagen School of Fashion
- Spouse: Hubbert Higgins
- Children: 2
- Awards: Order of National Artists of the Philippines

Salvacion Lim-Higgins (January 28, 1920 – September 15, 1990), also known professionally as Slim, was a Filipino fashion designer known for her haute couture. She is considered by many Filipino culture critics to be the mother of the modern terno.

In 2022, she was posthumously conferred as a National Artist of the Philippines, being the second fashion designer to receive the distinction following her contemporary Ramon Valera.

== Early life and education ==
Salvacion Lim-Higgins was born on January 28, 1920, to Luis Samson Lim Katiam and Margarita Navera Diaz. Her father was a Chinese immigrant who was involved in the ship chandler industry while her mother was a housewife. Salvacion had six other siblings.

A native of Legazpi, Lim went to Manila to study fine arts at the University of Santo Tomas (UST) and aimed to be a painter. She had Botong Francisco as her mentor in UST. Her studies was disrupted by World War II.

She would later enroll at the Traphagen School of Design in New York before returning to the Philippines in 1952.

== Career ==
World War II led her to pursue a more practical career in fashion design. After the end of the war, while waiting for school to resume, she sent sketches of her fashion design to the Manila Times, and began going by the trade name "Slim". Along with her elder sister Purificacion and family friend Consuelo Barberan, Slim would set up a fashion design shop in Manila in 1947 which later moved along to what is now Taft Avenue. Slim, would be heavily influenced by Hollywood culture of the 1950s and 1960s and would frequent Europe and New York to study fashion collections, learn techniques, and buy designer clothes to further improve her craft.

In 1960, Slim and Purificacion founded the Slim's Fashion and Art school, the first fashion school in the Philippines.

Slim briefly retired to become a housewife after getting married in the 1960s but came out of retirement in the mid-1970s. She would open her second shop along Amorsolo Street.

== Illness and death ==
Lim would be diagnosed with lung cancer in the mid-1980s despite being a non-smoker. She died on September 15, 1990.

== Legacy ==
Lim would be known for reinventing the terno. She was posthumously recognized as a National Artist of the Philippines in June 2022.

== Personal life ==
Lim was married to Hubert Higgins, an Irish expatriate in the Philippines, with whom they had two children. They married in 1960 when Lim was 40 years old and Higgins was 47.
