= Jose T. Joya =

Filipino artist (1931–1995)

Jose Joya
- Born: June 3, 1931; Manila, Philippines
- Died: May 11, 1995 (aged 63); Manila, Philippines
- Occupation: Abstract artist
- Awards: Order of National Artists of the Philippines

Jose Tanig Joya (June 3, 1931 – May 11, 1995) was a Filipino abstract artist and a National Artist of the Philippines awardee. Joya was a printmaker, painter, mixed media artist, and former dean of the University of the Philippines' College of Fine Arts. He pioneered abstract expressionism in the Philippines. His canvases were characterized by "dynamic spontaneity" and "quick gestures" in action painting. He is the creator of compositions that were described as "vigorous compositions" of heavy impastoes, bold brushstrokes, controlled dips, and diagonal swipes". Joya added the brilliant tropical colors. He was awarded a grant, which enabled him to pursue a master's degree in Fine Arts in 1956–57.

His works were strongly influenced by the tropical landscapes of the Philippine Islands. Among his masterpieces are the Nanking (a collage rendered with Asian calligraphy and forms and patterns resembling rice paddies), the Granadean Arabesque (1958) and Biennial (1964)

== Death ==
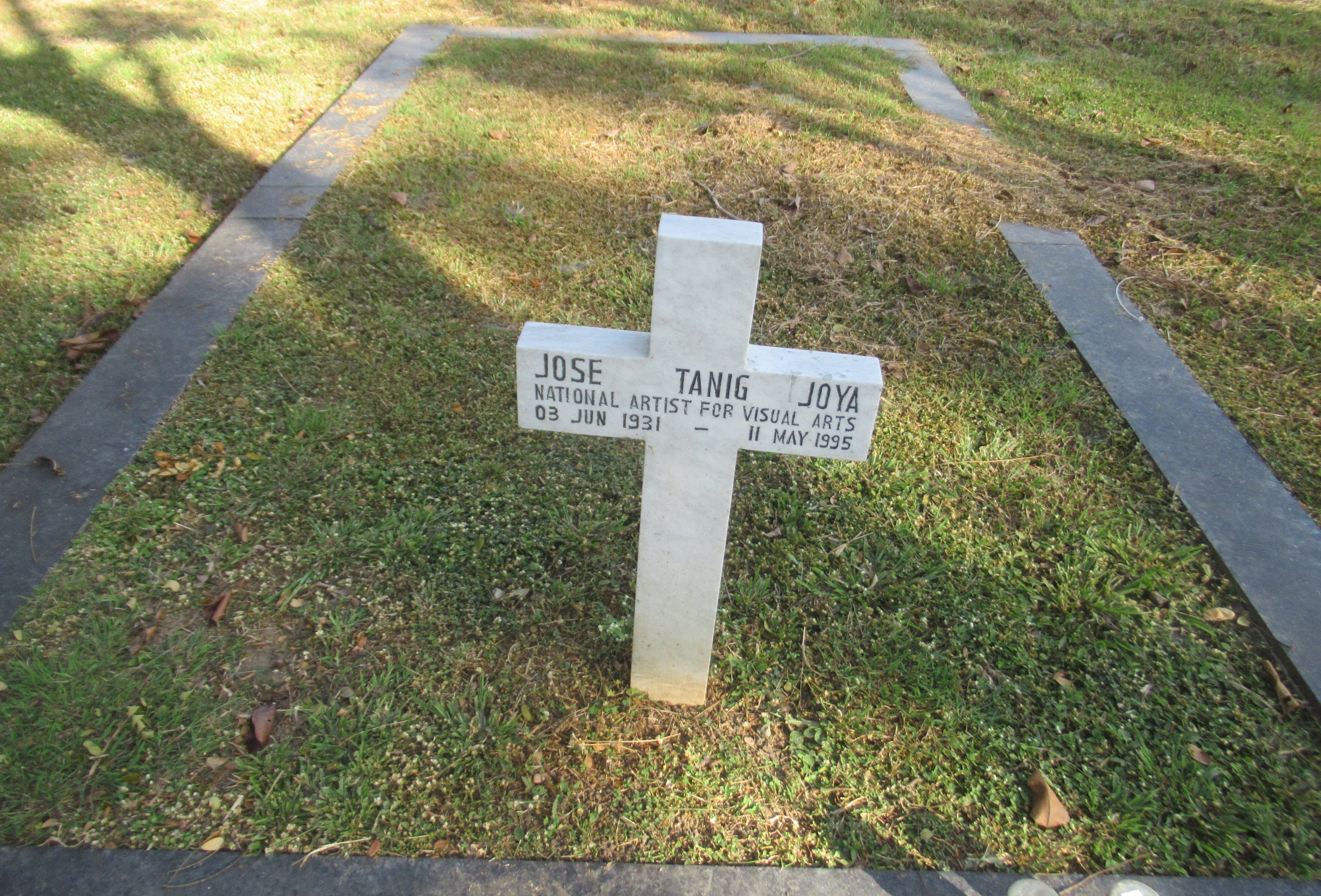
Joya's grave at the Libingan ng mga Bayani, Taguig

Jose died in 1995 of blood loss in Rizal Avenue, Manila, Philippines.

== See also ==
- Art Collection at the Philippine Center, New York City
