= Teodoro Hilado =

Filipino lighting technician and theater director

- Born: Teodoro Ledesma Hilado; May 15, 1938; Silay, Negros Occidental, Philippine Commonwealth
- Died: December 23, 2015 (aged 77)
- Organization: Cultural Center of the Philippines
- Spouse: Rosky Balahadia
- Children: 2
- Awards: Order of National Artists of the Philippines (2026)

Teodoro Ledesma Hilado (May 15, 1938 – December 23, 2015) was Filipino lighting technician and theater director who is recognized as a National Artist for Theater.

== Early life ==
Teodoro Hilado was born in Silay, Negros Occidental, on May 15, 1938.

== Career ==
Teodoro Ledesma Hilado worked as technical director of the Cultural Center of the Philippines (CCP) from 1969 to 1973, and theater director of the Folk Arts Theater from 1973 to 1986. He was also given the Gawad CCP Para sa Sining in 1997.

On lighting design, Hilado viewed the discipline as distinct from mere illumination, arguing that it should balance functionality, aesthetics, ease of operation, and cost efficiency, including consideration of energy consumption.

Outside of theater, Hilado did the lighting for the tomb of cardinal Jaime Sin at the Manila Cathedral and the tomb of President Ferdinand Marcos at the eponymous Ferdinand E. Marcos Presidential Center in Batac. He also did the lighting of the Tower One & Exchange Plaza in Makati, as well as various churches across the Philippines.

== Personal life ==
Hilado was married to Rosky Balahadia with whom he had two children. Hilado first met Balahadia when the latter was still one of the main dancers of the Bayanihan Philippine Dance Company.

== Death and legacy ==
Hilado died on December 23, 2015 due to brain cancer at age 77. Recognized as the "Father of Lighting Design in Philippine Theater", Hilado was posthumously recognized as a National Artist for Theater in September 2026.
