= Antonino Buenaventura =

Filipino composer and musician (1904–1996)

- Buenaventura conducting
- Born: May 04, 1904; Baliuag, Bulacan, Philippine Islands
- Died: January 25, 1996 (aged 91); Manila
- Occupations: composer, conductor, music director, teacher, soldier
- Spouse: Rizaliana Exconde
- Awards: Order of National Artists

Antonino Ramirez Buenaventura (May 4, 1904 – January 25, 1996) was a Filipino composer, conductor, and teacher.

== Biography ==
Antonino Buenaventura was born on May 4, 1904, in Baliuag, Bulacan. He was born into a family of musicians; his father Lucino Buenaventura was a musician at the Spanish Artillery Band in Intramuros. He studied under Nicanor Abelardo at the University of the Philippines Diliman Conservatory of Music and graduated in 1932 with a Teacher's Diploma in Music, major in Science and Composition and became an assistant instructor at the Conservatory. He also studied composition for a post-graduate degree under Jenő Takács.

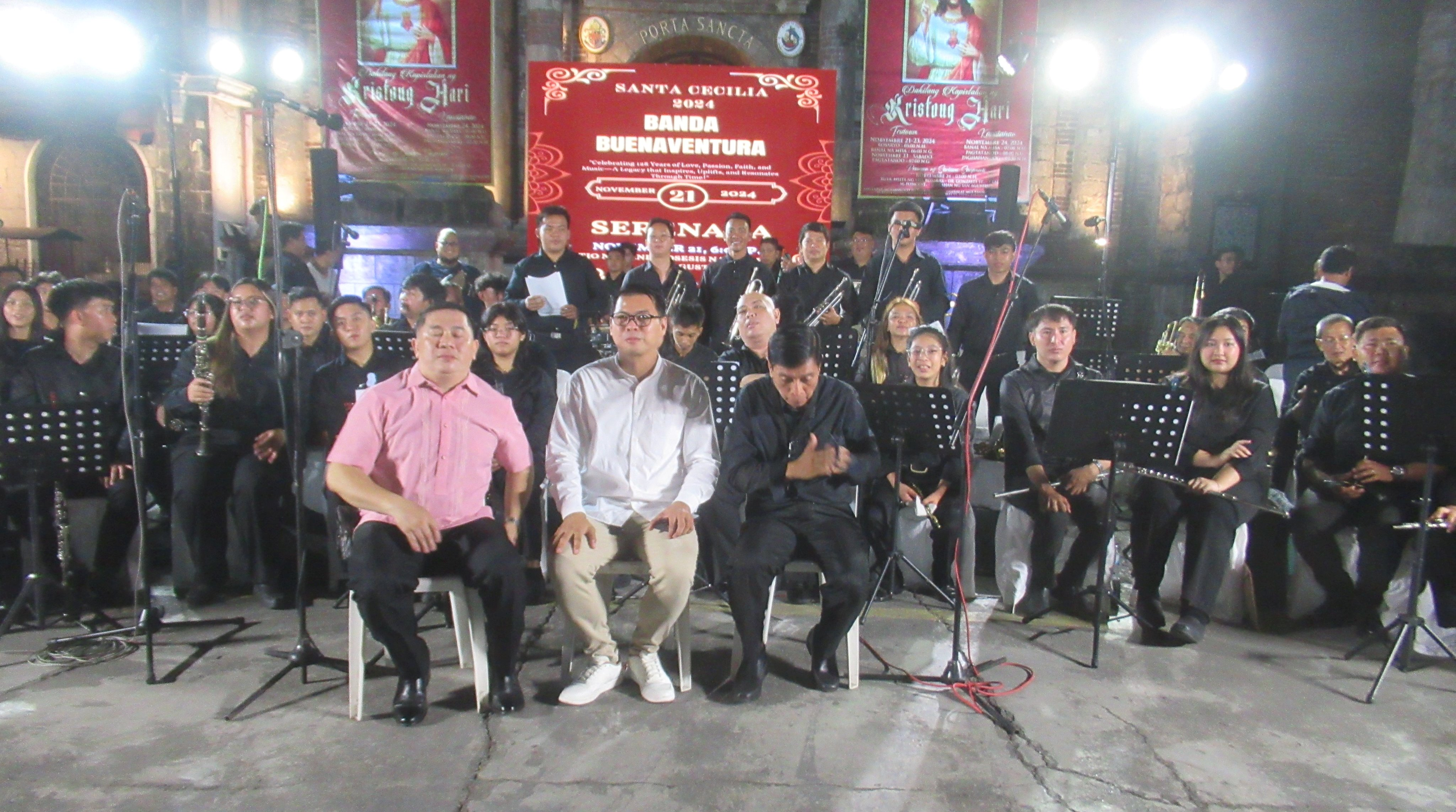
Banda Buenaventura (Baliwag)

After the war he became conductor of the devastated Philippine Constabulary Band for 16 years and he brought it back to its former glory.

He became the music director of the UST Conservatory of Music in 1961 and the UE School of Music and Arts in 1964.

He married the violinist Rizalina Exconde and they had 4 children, namely Antonino Jr., Arturo, Maria Beatriz Lourdes Salipsip, and Roberto.

== Music ==
Buenaventura's music was influenced by different ethnic Philippine folksongs. In 1935, he joined Francisca Reyes-Aquino in researching Philippine folksongs and dances. In 1936 he composed the accompaniment to the folk dance "Pandanggo sa Ilaw" and incorporated ethnic melodies and instruments to some of his compositions.

He composed "AFP on the March" in 1957, which is used as the marching music during ceremonies, inspection, and military graduations.

== Death ==
He died on January 25, 1996 in Manila, aged 91.

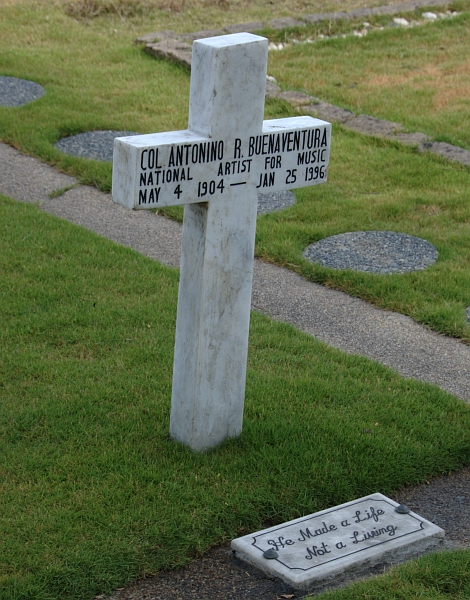

== Awards and honors ==
- Band Conductor of the Year (1951, from the Music Lovers Society)
- Republic Cultural Heritage Award for Music (1966, for his Symphony in C)
- Araw ng Maynila Cultural Award (1971)
- Award of Merit for Outstanding Contribution to Philippine Music (1976, from the Philippine Army)
- Director Emeritus of the University of the East (1981)
- National Artist of the Philippines (1988)
- Doctor of Humanities (1991, from the University of the Philippines)
- Diwa ng Lahi Award (1995)
