= Jovita Fuentes =

Filipina soprano singer (1895–1978)

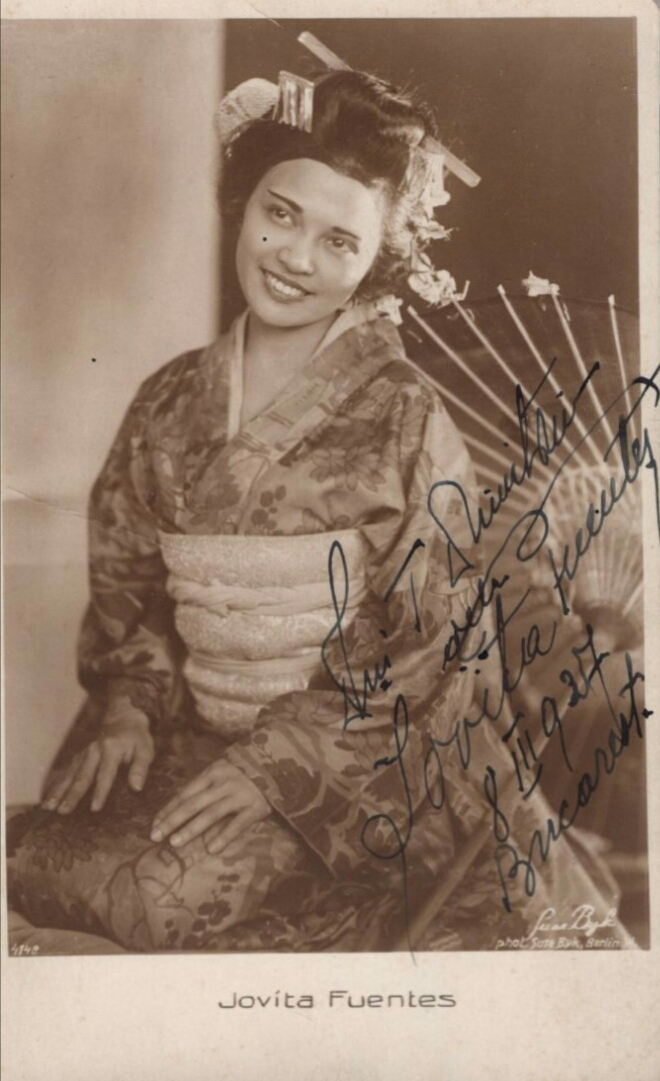
- Fuentes in Bucharest c. 1927 by Suse Byk
- Born: Jovita Flores Fuentes; February 15, 1895; Capiz, Capiz, Captaincy General of the Philippines (now Roxas, Capiz, Philippines)
- Died: August 15, 1978 (aged 83); Manila, Philippines
- Awards: Order of National Artists of the Philippines

Jovita Flores Fuentes (February 15, 1895 – August 7, 1978) was a Filipina soprano singer. She was known to be the first Filipina to receive recognition as a National Artist for Music in 1976 and one of the few Filipinas to receive international acclaim in the European opera scene.

== Background ==
=== Early life and education ===
She was born in Capiz (now Roxas City) to a well-off couple named Canuto and Dolores Fuentes. At an early age, she displayed interest in music, learning the contemporary songs at that time. This was evident when she was only five years, she was able to sing habaneras and danzas. She pursue her education by attending Colegio de Santa Isabel, and while on vacation to her studies, she would perform sarswelas and operattas to her neighbors and friends. She was also able to play the piano taught by a town organist after she moved in Manila.

After her studies at the Colegio de Santa Isabel, Fuentes had a formal voice training under Salvina Fornani, an Italian singer who was then residing in Manila. In 1917, she took up college at the Conservatory of Music of the University of the Philippines, Manila. In order to hone her skills further she pursued her studies abroad, going to Italy.

=== International success ===
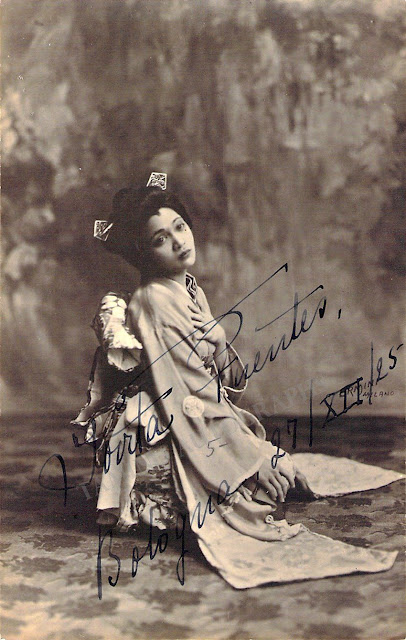
Fuentes in Bologna, Italy, signed December 27, 1925

In 1925, Fuentes made her debut as Cio-Cio-San in Puccini's Madame Butterfly, at the Teatro Municipale de Piacenza, another of her notable roles were of Mimi in La bohème, Pietro Mascagni's Iris and Richard Strauss' Salome.

From 1925 to 1927, she traveled to Europe including Germany, the Netherlands, France, and Belgium, establishing herself a reputation among theatergoers in Europe. She also traveled the United States where she became the first Filipino to ever perform in the American subcontinent. In 1928, Fuentes had recorded "Ay! Kalisud" for Odeon Records in Germany.

She later became an instructor upon her return. One of her pupils was Isang Tapales (1901-1987).

=== Later years ===
After World War II, she retired from performing but continue to teach music at the University of the Philippines in Diliman and the Holy Ghost College, Santa Isabel. She gave her final recital in 1945 appearing in the movie "Primadona" and gave up performing on stage entirely in 1955.

Due to her political connections, she was able to lobby lawmakers to pass a law which led to the creation of foundations promoting music. As a music advocate, she founded numerous music associations. These include the "Asociacion Musical de Filipinas" and the "Artists' Guild of the Philippines". Under Philippine president Diosdado Macapagal, her appeal for the establishment of the Music Production Foundation was granted through Republic Act No. 3630, with an appropriated ₱900,000 a year from the government. This was made specifically to maintain a Filipino symphony orchestra.

Due to her merits and contributions in her field, she was dubbed as The First Lady of Philippine Music and in 1976 she earned the title of becoming the first female national artist in music.

== Death and legacy ==
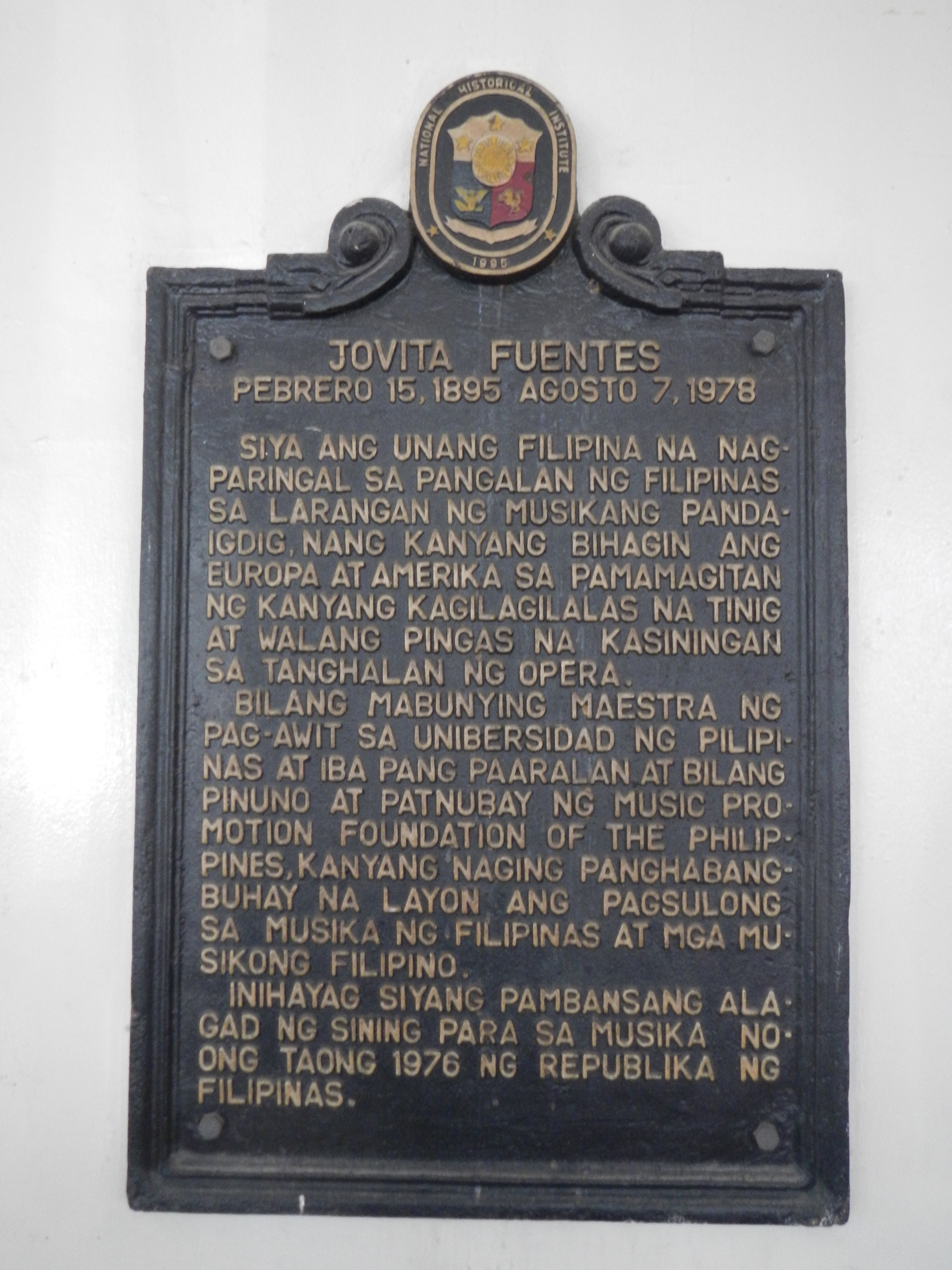
Jovita Fuentes historical marker at the University of the Philippines College of Music

On August 7, 1978, two years after she received the recognition, she died at the age of 83. According to the National Commission for Culture and the Arts, her performance was praised to be the "most sublime" interpretation on her part. Her life story was documented in a book by Lilia H. Chung titled, "Jovita Fuentes: A Lifetime of Music (1978)", which was later translated to Filipino by Virgilio S. Almario.

== Awards and recognitions ==
- Presidential Medal of Merit (1958)
- National Artist Award (1976)
