= Celeste Lecaroz =

Filipino visual artist

- Born: Celeste Lecaroz-Aceron y Salud; San Juan, Batangas, Philippines
- Known for: Painting
- Movement: Spontaneous realism

Celeste Lecaroz-Aceron y Salud (born 1971), also known as Celeste Lecaroz, is a Filipino visual artist who is known for her works in the spontaneous realism style.

== Early life and career ==
Lecaroz was born in 1971 and grew up in the seaside municipality of San Juan, Batangas. She spent her high school years at Maryknoll College (now known as Miriam College) in Quezon City, then graduated from the Ateneo de Manila University in 1993 with an AB Social Science degree. She worked as a research associate for the AIM Washington SyCip Policy Center before joining the Sarimanok News Network (now the ABS-CBN News Channel, or ANC) as a news anchor for Stock Market Live. After her marriage in 1998, she settled down as full-time homemaker.

== Career as painter ==
Lecaroz started painting professionally only in 2016 as an offshoot of her hobby of coloring adult coloring books. Her only formal art training was a short, three-day painting workshop under University of the Philippines Fine Arts professor Yasmin Almonte.

Inspired by the spontaneous realism style popularized by the Austrian artist VOKA, she painted large acrylic portraits, which led to her inclusion in several group shows. These exhibits include the Ateneo Alumni Art Fair and the Grupo Sining Batangueño. Lecaroz also joined the commemoration of the Philippine Independence Day in June 2017 by donating the paintings Jones Bridge in Spontanrealismus 1 and 2 to the Richmond Virginia County Museum and the Jones Ancestral Home Gallery.

She also joined the Pintang Laya exhibit in August 2017, where she donated a portrait of student leader Edgar Jopson to raise funds for the staging of the play, Never Again: Voices of Martial Law.

Eventually, she held her first solo exhibit entitled “Lecaroz Spontanrealismus” at the Gateway Gallery in Cubao, Quezon City in May 2018. In that same year, she released the copyright for her portraits of the late presidents Manuel L. Quezon and Corazon Aquino, allowing anyone to use those images for free.

Portrait of Manuel L. Quezon

2019 was a banner year for Lecaroz, with several high-profile exhibitions. These included the “Pastel Puro” exhibit at Galerie Y with pastel artist Gary Carabio in August, followed by her participation in the Center and Periphery show at the National Commission for Culture and the Arts Gallery in September.

She also held a one-night solo exhibit entitled “Spontanrealismus Lecaroz 2.0: Honouring Filipino Tycoons & Entrepreneurs”, at the Rigodon Ballroom of Manila Peninsula on September 6, 2019, as part of the 40th anniversary celebration of Hi-Cool Engineering Corporation. The exhibit featured 50 five feet by four feet portraits of the Philippines’ top and emerging business leaders.

Lecaroz's portrait of Manuel L. Quezon was donated to commemorate the opening of the Balai Quezon educational center of the Philippine Embassy in Tel Aviv, Israel in November 2019.

To commemorate the life of the late NBA legend Kobe Bryant, Lecaroz painted “Mamba Forever!” and released the copyright to her painting last January 2020.

In October 2020, Lecaroz was among more than 20 artists who lent their talent to the World Wildlife Fund for Nature's Earth Exhibit – a digital fundraising event series that celebrates their work and the rich biodiversity of the Philippine landscape. The featured artists accepted commissions from the public, with part of the proceeds going to WWF's local conservation efforts.

The following year, Lecaroz held her fifth one-woman show entitled “Blue Skies, Crimson Wind,” at Eastwood City Mall's The Atrium. The exhibit, which ran from March 1 to 11, 2021 featured pastel paintings of playful flower girls in impressionism style. In the exhibition essay, award-winning writer Och Gonzalez said that with the exhibit, “the artist invites us to engage in a wistful return to innocence and connection, not as a means of escape, but as a note of hope to carry us forward into brighter days.”

From June 30 to July 28, 2021, Lecaroz staged her sixth solo exhibition, “Repetitio,” at the Makati gallery 1335MABINI. Held in collaboration with the Fernando Amorsolo Art Foundation, the exhibit comprises 15 reinterpretations of works by National Artist Fernando Amorsolo, which Lecaroz renders into spontaneous realism. “Exploring the idea of translation as reinterpretation, Lecaroz effectively borrows Amorsolo’s timeless subjects to explore her present-day artistic ideals. Characterized by uninhibited brushwork, strident colors, and the simplification and abstraction of subject matter, she describes the collection as 'experimentations on chromostereopsis,' that is, visual illusions whereby depth is achieved in two-dimensional color palettes with bright, saccharine colors,” wrote art curator and critic John Alexis Balaguer in his review.

As part of the 2021 Quincentennial Commemorations in the Philippines, Lecaroz created a portrait of Enrique of Malacca, who is said to be the first person to circumnavigate the globe and theorized to have Filipino ancestry.

== Style and subjects ==
Lecaroz is best known for her portraits of influential figures, with several works on permanent display at different institutions. Her portrait of Jose Rizal is exhibited at the Sentro Rizal branch of the Philippine Embassy in Washington DC. Meanwhile, her portrait of Apolinario Mabini is prominently displayed at the Batangas City Capitol building.

Historical milieus are also common subjects of Lecaroz's paintings; Lecaroz explains that the lives of artists in the Philippines are shaped by the country's historical and cultural milieu. This is reflected in the Sisterhood series of paintings that debuted at the “Pastel Puro” exhibit, which depicted two Filipinas at the turn of the century, enjoying leisurely activities. Meanwhile, the paintings at the Center and Periphery show were based on vintage photographs from the collection of Dr. Bernardita R. Churchill, president of the Philippine National Historical Society. At her sixth solo exhibition, “Repetitio”, Lecaroz reinterpreted 15 rural Philippine landscapes by National Artist Fernando Amorsolo in her signature spontaneous realism style.

For Lecaroz, art is a personal advocacy; in an interview with Fringe Magazine last January 2019, she declared that artists have an important role to play in raising consciousness and contributing to public discourse.

At the “Spontanrealismus” exhibit, noted painter Fernando Sena reportedly remarked that there will come a time when Lecaroz will be recognized as one of the giants in the art world.

== Notable works ==
- Mother Teresa in Spontanrealismus
- Portrait of Carlos “Chochoy” Medina, international human rights lawyer
- Calachuchi Walk
- Manuel Quezon in Spontanrealismus
- Spontanrealismus: Lecaroz’ first solo exhibit that featured 17 portraits mostly of prominent figures in politics, government and the arts
- Kalinga Girl
- Rizal Library in Spontanrealismus
- Sisterhood series. A series of 10 paintings depicting a pair of Filipino women enjoying leisurely activities at the turn of the century in Manila. This series includes the painting 'Cuentos', which was used as the cover of the book "Kwentong Alzheimer's: Volume 1" by Dr. Eva S.E. Aranas-Angel.
- Spontanrealismus Lecaroz 2.0: Honouring Filipino Tycoons & Entrepreneurs series. This series includes 50 portraits of established and upcoming Filipino business leaders. Painted to commemorate the 40th anniversary of the Hi-Cool Engineering Corporation.
- Mamba Forever!
- Repetitio. An exhibition of 15 derivatives of paintings by National Artist Fernando Amorsolo, officially licensed by the Fernando C. Amorsolo Art Foundation.

== Major exhibitions ==
Spontanrealismus Lecaroz
May 12–26, 2018
Gateway Gallery

Pastel Puro
August 10–23, 2019
Galerie Y, Megamall

Center and Periphery
September 2–30, 2019
NCCA Gallery, Intramuros, Manila

Spontanrealismus Lecaroz 2.0 - Honouring Filipino Tycoons & Entrepreneurs
Private exhibition
September 6, 2019
Manila Peninsula

Blue Skies, Crimson Wind
March 1–11, 2021
The Atrium, Eastwood City Mall

Repetitio
June 30-July 28, 2021
1335MABINI

Dialogo
November 13-December 3, 2021
Art Elaan

Repetitio
Bacolod
May 4-June 4, 2022
Charlie's Art Gallery, Bacolod City

== Personal life ==
Celeste Lecaroz is married to lawyer Marvin Aceron, with whom she has four children.
