= Alfredo S. Perez =

Filipino painter and sculptor (1947–2024)

Al Perez
- Born: Alfredo Santos Perez; March 30, 1947; Hagonoy, Bulacan, Philippines
- Died: February 28, 2024; Philippines
- Education: University of Santo Tomas
- Known for: Painting, Sculpture
- Notable work: Heritage church paintings, ancestral houses, nipa huts, mother and child
- Spouse: Marivic Formoso Perez
- Children: Christina Perez

Alfredo Santos Perez (March 30, 1947 – February 28, 2024) was a Filipino painter and sculptor celebrated for his highly realistic portrayals of heritage churches and cultural landmarks. He earned the epithets "Master painter of heritage churches" and "Father of heritage art." In recognition of his lifelong dedication to Filipino cultural heritage, he was posthumously nominated for the Order of National Artist for Visual Arts.

== Early life and education ==
Perez was born on March 30, 1947, in Hagonoy, Bulacan, Philippines. As a child, he suffered from a life-threatening illness, leading his grandmother to vow his life to God at the Santo Cristo visita chapel in their hometown, an event that influenced his later focus on sacred and heritage subjects.

Perez studied Fine Arts at the University of Santo Tomas (UST), graduating in 1968 under the mentorship of Professor Emeritus Cenon Rivera, former director of the university’s Department of Fine Arts and a noted artist whose stained-glass works adorn several Philippine churches. He later pursued further studies in New York, attending the Art Students League in 1984 and the School of Visual Arts in 1996.

== Artistic career ==
Perez became known for his intricate and realistic depictions of Spanish colonial churches, ancestral homes, and other heritage sites in the Philippines. Over five decades, he produced hundreds of works that highlighted the spiritual and cultural legacy of the Filipino people.

He received commissions for religious artworks, including gifts for two pontiffs: in 1981, he painted the Agoo, La Union Church for Pope John Paul II, and in 2015, he created a portrait of Pope Francis. His paintings of heritage churches and saints were also reproduced on Philippine stamps, and in 1989 he was honored with the Araw ng Maynila Award by the City of Manila.

Perez also represented the Philippines in international art competitions, including the Havana Biennale in 1986 and the 17th Singapore International Arts Festival in 1998. His works were featured in calendars, stamps, seals and exhibitions both locally and abroad. In 2005, his paintings of Philippine colonial churches were included in a national calendar series, and in 2017, forty (40) of his church paintings were reproduced for the Christmas TB Seals campaign by the Philippine Tuberculosis Society, Inc.

Beyond heritage art, Perez painted rural landscapes, nudes, and still lifes, holding solo and group exhibitions across Asia, Europe, and the United States.

== Legacy and recognition ==
According to his daughter Christina, Perez worked hard to support his family and siblings with his artistic talent. She emphasized that he left a lasting legacy through his paintings of Philippine churches, which embodied the Filipino people’s spiritual and cultural identity.

Eleazar Abraham "Abe" Orobia, public relations officer of the UST Atelier Alumni Association, Inc., stated that Perez helped promote a deeper appreciation of historical sites and houses of worship, capturing architectural features that have since been lost or were at risk of disappearing. Assistant Professor Mary Ann Bulanadi of the UST College of Fine Arts and Design remembered him as a supportive presence in the art community, active in both the national and Bulacan art scenes.

After his death, Al Perez’s works were included in Pulilan’s Mandala Art Fest titled “Maestro Bulakenyo,” an exhibition honoring Bulakenyo masters in visual arts such as National Artists Guillermo Tolentino and Jose Joya. The exhibit, held at the Demetrio Gallery, celebrated artists who contributed to placing Bulacan in the national and international art scene.

== Death ==
Perez died on February 28, 2024, at the age of 76 due to cardiac arrest.
