= Francisca Reyes-Aquino =

Filipino dancer (1899–1983)

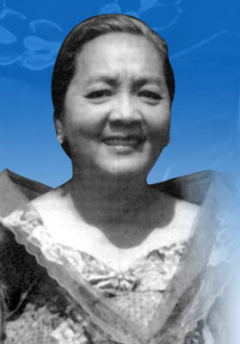
- Francisca Reyes-Aquino from the Order of National Artists (NCCA)
- Born: Francisca Reyes; March 9, 1899; Bocaue, Bulacan, Philippine Republic
- Died: November 21, 1983 (aged 84); Manila, Philippines
- Occupations: Folk dancer; academic
- Notable work: Philippine Folk Dances and Games (1926)
- Awards: Republic Award of Merit (1954); Ramon Magsaysay Award (1962); Order of National Artists of the Philippines

Francisca Reyes-Aquino (March 9, 1899 – November 21, 1983) was a Filipino folk dancer and academic noted for her research on Philippine folk dance. She is a recipient of the Republic Award of Merit and the Ramon Magsaysay Award and is a designated National Artist of the Philippines for Dance.

== Biography ==
Francisca was born in Bocaue, Bulacan on March 9, 1899. Reyes-Aquino studied Physical Education and graduated with a BS Education degree from the University of the Philippines and Sargent College in Boston.

Among Reyes-Aquino's most noted works is her research on folk dances and songs as a student assistant at the University of the Philippines (UP). Pursuing her graduate studies, she started her work in the 1921 traveling to remote barrios in Central and Northern Luzon.

She published a thesis in 1926 entitled "Philippine Folk Dances and Games" where she noted on previously unrecorded forms of local celebration, ritual and sports. Reyes-Aquino discovered and taught dances through her books such as Tinikling, Maglalatik, Lubi-lubi, Polka sa Nayon. Her thesis was made with teachers and playground instructors from both public and private institutions in mind. This work was expanded with the official support of UP President Jorge Bocobo in 1927. She then served at the university as part of the faculty for 18 years.

She served as supervisor of physical education at the Bureau of Education in the 1940s. The education body distributed her work and adapted the teaching of folk dancing in an effort to promote awareness among the Filipino youth regarding their cultural heritage. President Ramon Magsaysay conferred her the Republic Award of Merit in 1954 for her "outstanding contribution toward the advancement of Filipino culture". Her contributions to physical education also introduced the subject to the American school curriculum.

Reyes-Aquino also had other books published including Philippine National Dances (1946), Gymnastics for Girls (1947), Fundamental Dance Steps and Music (1948), Foreign Folk Dances (1949), Dances for all Occasion (1950), Playground Demonstration (1951), and Philippine Folk Dances, Volumes I to VI.

== Death, legacy and honors ==
Francisca died on November 21, 1983, in Manila, Philippines.

Reyes-Aquino received recognition for her works such as the Ramon Magsaysay Award for Government Service in 1962 and her designation as National Artist of the Philippines for Dance in 1973.

Francisca was posthumously honored with a Google Doodle designed of her popular traditional Filipino dance and it was unveiled on March 9, 2019, to celebrate her 120th birth anniversary and for her very excellent contributions in Filipino dancing.
