= Carlo Curti =

Italian composer

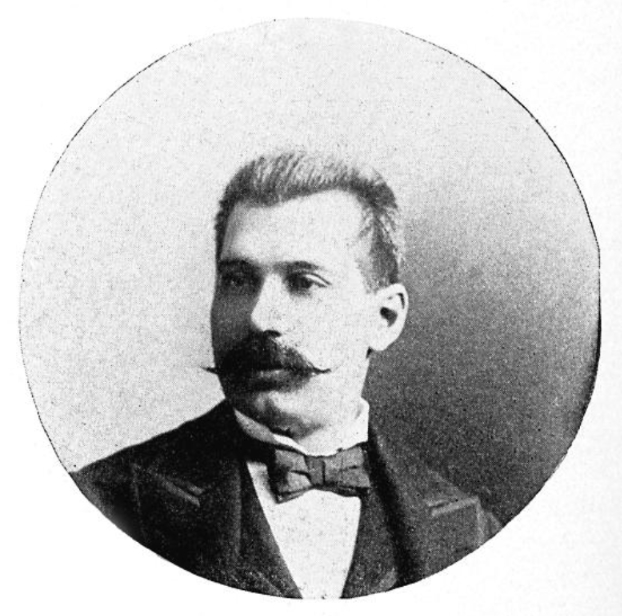
- Born: May 6, 1859; Gallicchio, Italy
- Died: May 8, 1922 (aged 63); Mexico City, Mexico
- Occupations: Mandolinist, violinist, xylophonist, music educator

Carlo Curti (6 May 1859 – 8 May 1922), also known as Carlos Curti, was an Italian musician, composer and bandleader. He moved to the United States during his mid-teen years, where he popularized the mandolin in American music. He is credited by musicologist Paul Sparks with starting a national "grass-roots mandolin orchestra craze" that lasted from 1880 until the 1920s.

He also contributed to Mexican society in 1884 by creating one of Mexico's oldest orchestras, the Mexican Typical Orchestra. The orchestra under his leadership represented Mexico at the New Orleans Cotton Exhibition. As with his Spanish Students, Curti dressed his Mexican band in costumes, choosing the charro cowboy outfit. The patriotic value of having Mexico represented on the international stage gave a boost to mariachi bands (which had normally been repressed by social elites); the mariachis began using charro outfits as Curti's orchestra had done, expressing pride in being Mexican. Curti's Orquestra Típica Mexicana has been called the "predecessor of the Mariachi bands."

He was an orchestra leader, composer, educator at the Conservatorio Nacional de Música (Mexican National Conservatory of Music), xylophonist, violinist, mandolinist and author of a mandolin method. He directed the orchestra at the New York's Waldorf-Astoria hotel in his later career.

Also known as a composer of zarzuelas and dance music, among his most noted tunes are "La Tipica" and "Flower of Mexico". His brother was harpist Giovanni (Juan or John) Curti, who also was a member of his orchestra.

== Spanish Students (1880–1884) ==
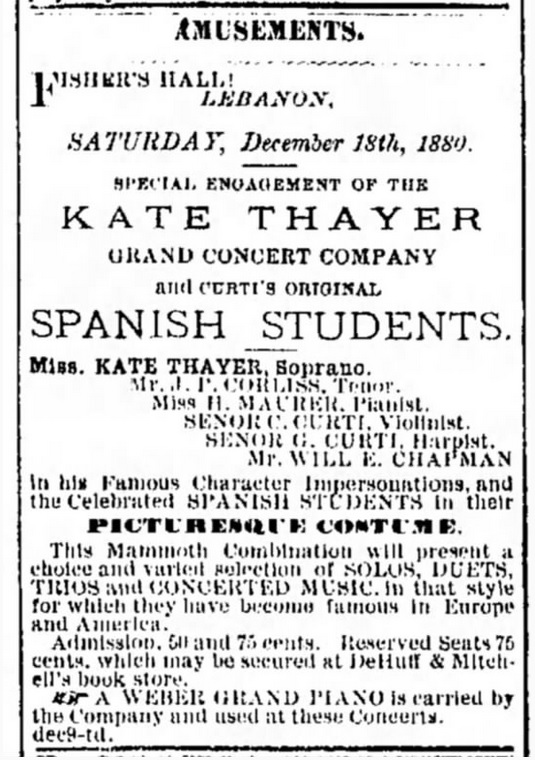
Advertisement for a December 1880 show that included "Curti's Original Spanish Students"

Curti was born in Gallicchio, province of Potenza, Basilicata. About five years after he arrived in the United States (c.1875), Curti saw the opportunity to imitate one of the great acts of his day, the Estudiantina Figaro, also known as the Estudiantina Figueroa or "Spanish Students" troupe, a costumed, dancing, bandurria-playing group from Spain that was touring in the United States (as well as the United Kingdom and parts of South America in the early 1880s). Curti had experience in show business, working with a small traveling opera, along with his brother John. He took advantage, figuring that people wouldn't see the difference when he (an Italian) pretended to be Spanish. He even started using Carlos, instead of Carlo.

He established a group similar to the Spanish Students, but made up of Italians playing mandolins (because of the similarity to violins, which they knew). The group blatantly used the Spanish Students' name while touring the United States. He later admitted what he had done, and started another group or changed his groups' name to the "Roman Students".

The imitators' use of mandolins helped to generate enormous public interest in an instrument previously relatively unknown in the United States. They left an impression on the people who saw them, and the mandolin, rather than the bandurria became established in the United States and Europe.

== Mexican Typical Orchestra (1884–1887) ==
=== Beginning in 1884 ===
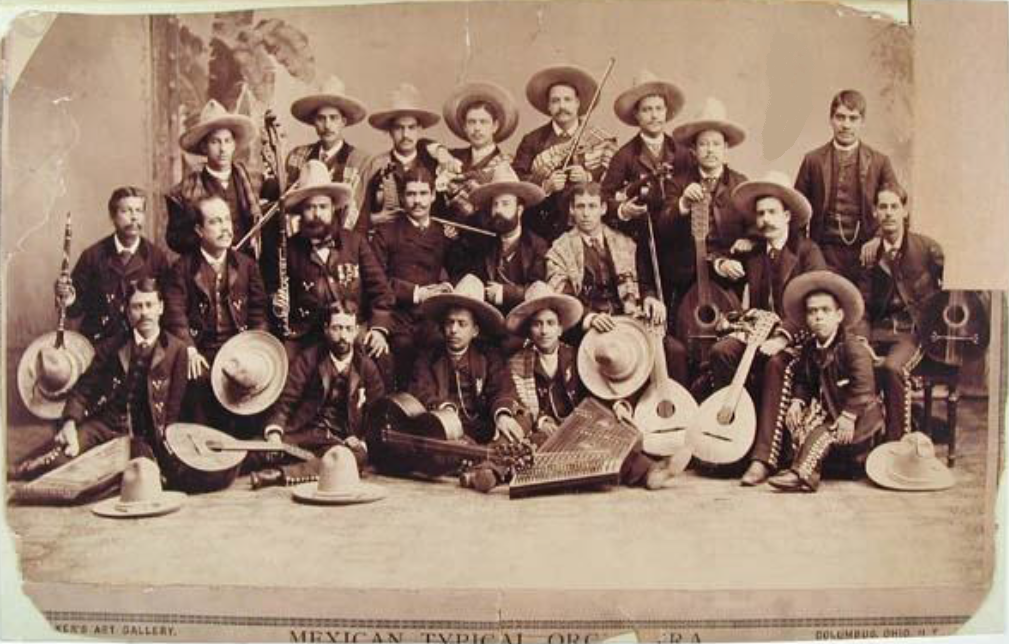
Mexican Typical Orchestra (La Orquesta Típica de la Ciudad de México) c. 1885. Photo would have been taken while Curti was bandleader, and he has been identified on some websites as sitting on the far right with a bandolón (18 string guitar-sized instrument) leaning against him.

Curti took his knowledge of the elaborate costumed performances he had participated in and organized since coming to the United States, and created a new show in Mexico, what became the Orquesta Típica Mexicana (Mexican Typical Orchestra). The Mexican Typical Orchestra was originally conceived by the salterio player Encarnación García and bandolónist Andrés Díaz de la Vega but its creation was consolidated in the hands of its director and founder, xylophone player and composer Carlos Curti, in August 1884.

It initially consisted of 19 musicians, most of them from the Conservatorio Nacional de Música (Mexican National Conservatory of Music) and distributed as follows:

- Flute. Anastasio Meneses.
- Harp. Juan Curti.
- Salterios. Maria Encarnación García and Mariano Aburto. Garcia played a 99 string Salterio that resembled a dulcimer.
- First Bandolóns. Andrés Díaz de la Vega. Pedro Zariñana, Mariano Pagani y Apolonio Domínguez. Bandolóns were shaped like a cittern or bouzouki with 18 strings (6 courses of 3 strings).
- Second Bandolóns. Vidal Ordaz, Vicente Solís y José Borbolla.
- Guitars. Pantaleón Dávila and Pedro Dávila.
- Violins. Antonio Figueroa, Jose Molina, and Enrique Palacios.
- Viola: Buenaventura Herrera.
- Cellos. Rafale Galindo and Eduardo Gabrielli.
- Xylophone. Carlos Curti.

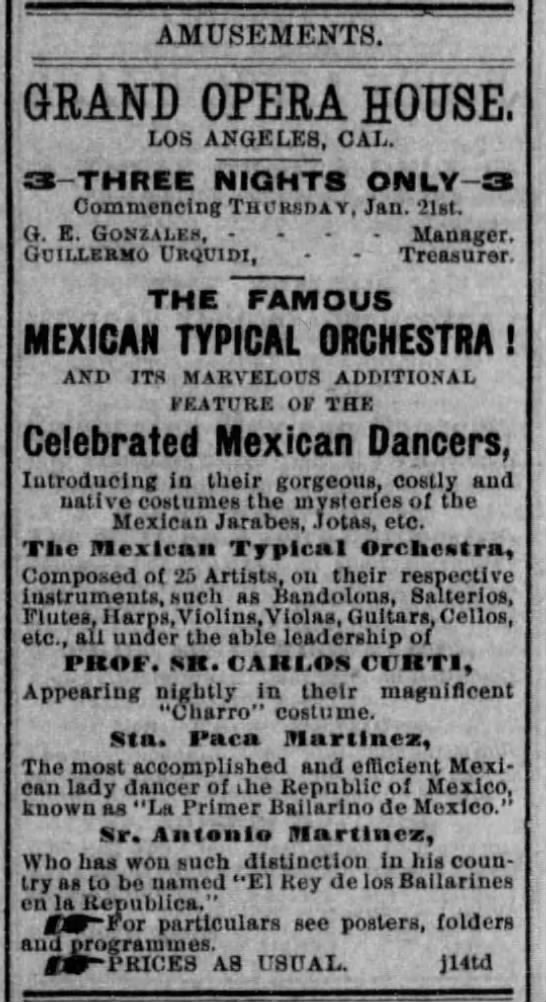
Advertisement for the Mexican Typical orchestra from the Los Angeles Herald, January 21, 1886.

=== First concert ===
The orchestra debuted Saturday night September 20, 1884 at a private concert, held at the Conservatory Orchestra's Theatre and alternated in the concert with the Conservatory Orchestra. The Mexican Typical Orchestra played the following five works during the third part of programming:

1. Obertura of the Opera "Raymond" by Ambroise Thomas
2. Mazurca "Los Ecos" para solo de Salterio by Encarnación García
3. Fantasía sobre la Opera "Norma" by Vincenzo Bellini
4. Marcha de la Opera "Tanhäuser" by Richard Wagner
5. Aires Nacionales Mexicanos by Carlos Curti.

=== Presidential endorsement ===
This concert was attended by the president of Mexico, General Porfirio Díaz, who at the time named the group "Orquesta Típica Mexicana". The president was interested in supporting the group, because he had issues during his election campaign in which his opponents used folk music as propaganda against him. The president wanted to bring order and stability and modernity to Mexico, and music was one of the tools he used. The "Aires Nacionales Mexicanos" (Mexican National Tunes) put together by Curti along with ethnic instruments like the salterio impressed the General.

The orchestra toured Mexico, the United States and Europe. They gave performances in several places in the Mexican capital. The orchestra performed at the Arbeu Theater in a performance dedicated to the Honorable Foreign Colonies and to the Mexican students; this was also an audition, performed on December 3, 1884, and of Carlos Curti's arrangement of "Mexican National Tunes" was endorsed. As a result, the orchestra was invited to perform at the New Orleans Universal Expo. Over the next three years the band made several tours; the first to the United States, starting for the Universal Exhibition in New Orleans and continuing to New York and several cities in the US. The second tour started in January 1886, visiting Zacatecas on January 8, and then again the US, Canada and Cuba returning to the City Mexico in July 1887. The band disintegrated abruptly in the city of Puebla, and little is known of its fate after so sudden dissolution. It was understood that the musicians who should return to their academic activities at the National Conservatory of Music that had been abandoned during the touring. Among these was Mr. Curti, who later dedicated himself to conduct the orchestra Circo Orrín.

=== The orchestra after Carlo Curti ===
La Tipica
"La Tipica" - polka by Carlo Curti, performed by Trio Romano in 1921.

Merci
"Merci" - gavotte by Carlo Curti, performed by Joaquín J. Arriaga and Octaviano Yáñez in 1913.

The Mexican typical orchestra would continue in 1901 with conductor Juan Velázquez, who was with the orchestra and Carlos Curti during his second tour. The third lead was Miguel Lerdo de Tejada who organized it as the Orquesta Típica Lerdo in 1901. The orchestra is still in existence, after 120 years, and was declared a "Intangible Cultural Heritage of the Capital" (of Mexico) on May 31, 2011.

== Last years ==
After fourteen years in Mexico, Curti returned to New York in 1897. At the beginning of the 1900s, he was conductor of the Waldorf–Astoria Orchestra for several years. He also formed another group called "Orquesta Mexicana Curti" with whom made recordings for Columbia Records in 1905, 1906 and 1912. His later life was marked by tragic events: he suffered financial difficulties and his wife Carmen shot herself on January 28, 1914, after he had lost his job at the Waldorf-Astoria. Then Curti came back to Mexico City, where he committed suicide in 1922.

== Works ==
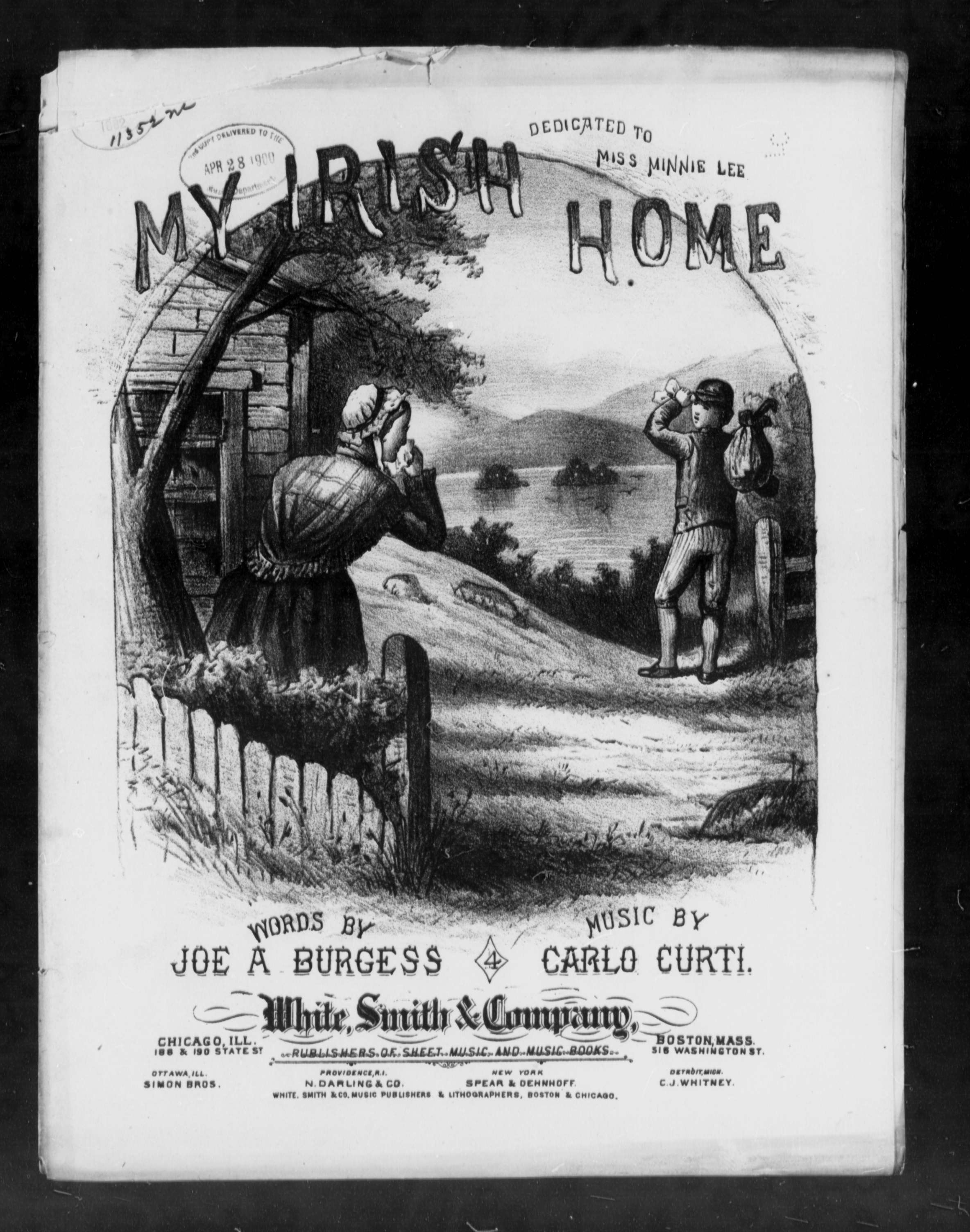
My Irish Home sheet music with music by Carlo Curti and words by Joe A. Burgess, published Chicago, 1882.

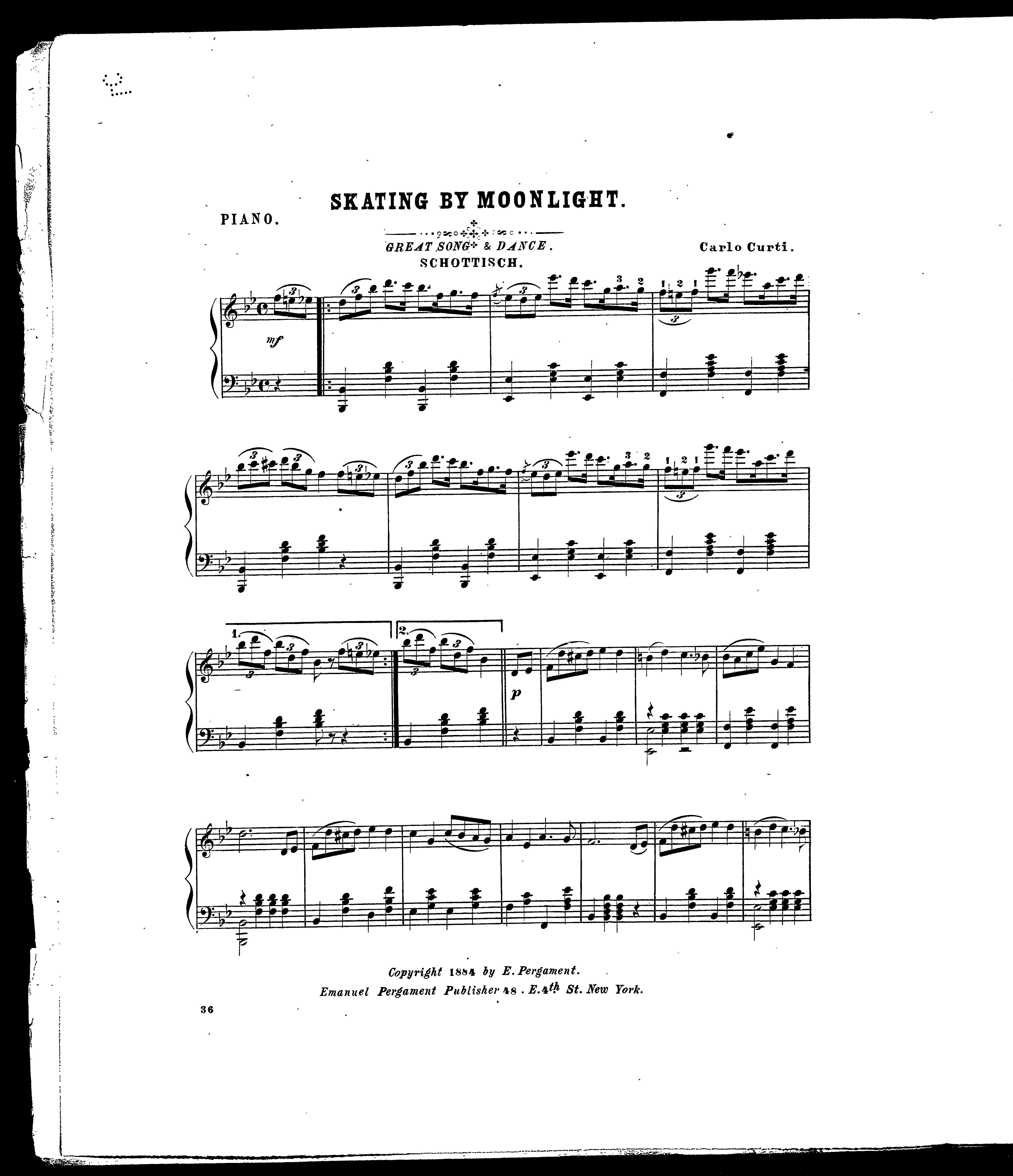
Skating by Moonlight sheet music for piano, by Carlos Curti, published New York, 1884 by Emanuel Pergament.

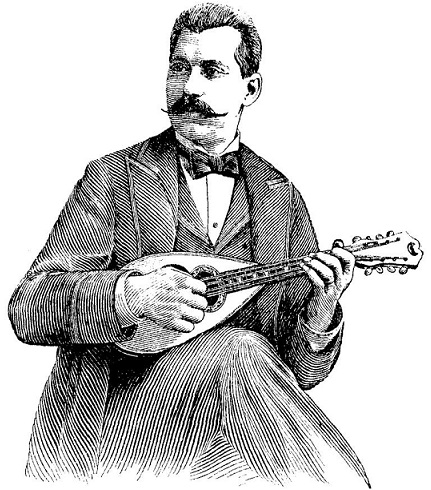
Carlo Curti from his 1896 book, Complete Method for the Mandolin, published by T.B. Harms of New York and London.

Not merely an imitator, Curti was a multi-instrumental musician and a composer as well. He published sheet music as early as 1880 in New York, but also published extensively in Mexico.

- My Irish Home. Words by Joe A. Burgess. (August, 1892)
- La Tipica. Polka. (1895)
- Florera. Polka. (1891)
- Nueva Espana. (1894)
- Una boda en Santa Lucia. (1894)
- La patria. Military march. (1895)
- Merci. Gavotte. (1896)
- El Gondolero. Waltz, (1896)
- Serenate. (1897)
- Siempre alegre. Polka, (1897)
- Il n'y a pas de quoi. Welcome. Schottische. (1897)
- La cuarta plana. (1899)
- Los de abajo. (1899)
- El novio de Tacha. (1900)
- Benedictina, en "La cuarta plana". Gavota. (1901)
- Bolero, en "La cuarta plana". (1901)
- Diablito. Polka. (1901)
- Nemrod, rey de Babilonia. Operetta. Sala Wagner, (1901)
- Saravia, danza en la zarzuela La cuarta plana. (1901)
- Tango, danza en la zarzuela "La cuarta plana". (1901)
- Under the Bamboo Tree. Mandolin duo. Arranged by Carlo Curti (1902)
- While the Convent Bells Were Wringing. Mandolin duo. Arranged by Carlo Curti (1902)
- Queen of the ball. Waltz. (1905)
- Flower of Mexiko. Intermezzo. (1904)
- Maesmawr. Valse lente. (1905)
- The matador. March and two-step, (1905)
- Blue ribbon. Two-step patrol. (1906)
- Rosita. Valse romantique. (1907)
- Notturno in D. Violin and piano. (1908)
- Petit bijou (Little jewel). Gavotte. (1908)
- Chimes of old Cornell. (1917)
- Visions of love (Visione d'amore). Waltz. (1928)
- Angela. Schottische.
- Bogando. Barcarola, en la pantomima acuatica "Una boda en Santa Lucia".
- Brisa. Valse.
- Champagne. Polka en la pantomima Una boda en Santa Lucia.
- Constanza. Mazurka.
- Dias felices. Schottische.
- Entre amigos. Polka.
- Fregoli. Polka.
- Gondolero. Vals.
- Ilusiones. Vals.
- Juego hidraulico. Vals
- Lamentos.
- Lluvia de rosas. Vals.
- Lola. Polka.
- Maria Enriqueta. Danza.
- Merci! Schottische.
- Momna. Mazurka..
- Monica. Mazurka.
- Mundo ilustrado, en la zarzuela La cuarta plana). Vals.
- Nueva Espana. Pasa-calle.
- Otilia. Polka.
- Pan American-Marsch.
- Pas de quoi! Schottische.
- Polka militar.
- Predilecta. Vals.
- Recuerdos. Mazurka.
- Teresa. Gavotta.
- Tus ojos. Schottische.
- Xylosono. Polka.
- lbum de Mexico. Coleccion de 10 piezas celebres para mandolina y piano con 2.

=== Recordings ===
==== Victor ====
His compositions were recorded 10 times on Victor Records. including:

- Saravia, Antonio Vargas, 1902
- The flower of Mexico, Arthur Pryor's Band, 1904
- Tipica polka, W. Eugene Page; D. F. Ramseyer, 1909
- Blue ribbon, Conway's Band, 1914
- La tipica, Trio Romano[ i.e., Cibelli's Neapolitan Orchestra], 1921
- La cuarta plana, Banda de Zapadores, 1905
- La cuarta plana, Trío Arriaga, 1905
- Canción de la saravia, Esperanza Iris, 1906

==== Columbia ====
- Estudiantina Walzer by Waldteufel with the Columbia Orchestra, with Kastagnetten; La tipica polka by Carlo Curti with the Orquesta Espanola
- La Tipica, F Lahoz; Carlos Curti; Curti's Band.; Banda Española, 1910

==== Zonophone ====
- Flower of Mexico, Hager's Orchestra, 1906

==== Modern ====
Among modern reinterpretations are:

- La Tipica, Los Alegres de Terán, 1961
- La Tipica, Mariachi Vargas de Tecalitlán, 1963
- La Tipica, Flaco Jiménez, 1988
- La Tipica, Nashville Mandolin Ensemble, 1998
- La Tipica, Terry Waldo, 2004
- La Tipica, Milwaukee Mandolin Orchestra, 2007
- Flower of Mexico, Milwaukee Mandolin Orchestra, 2015
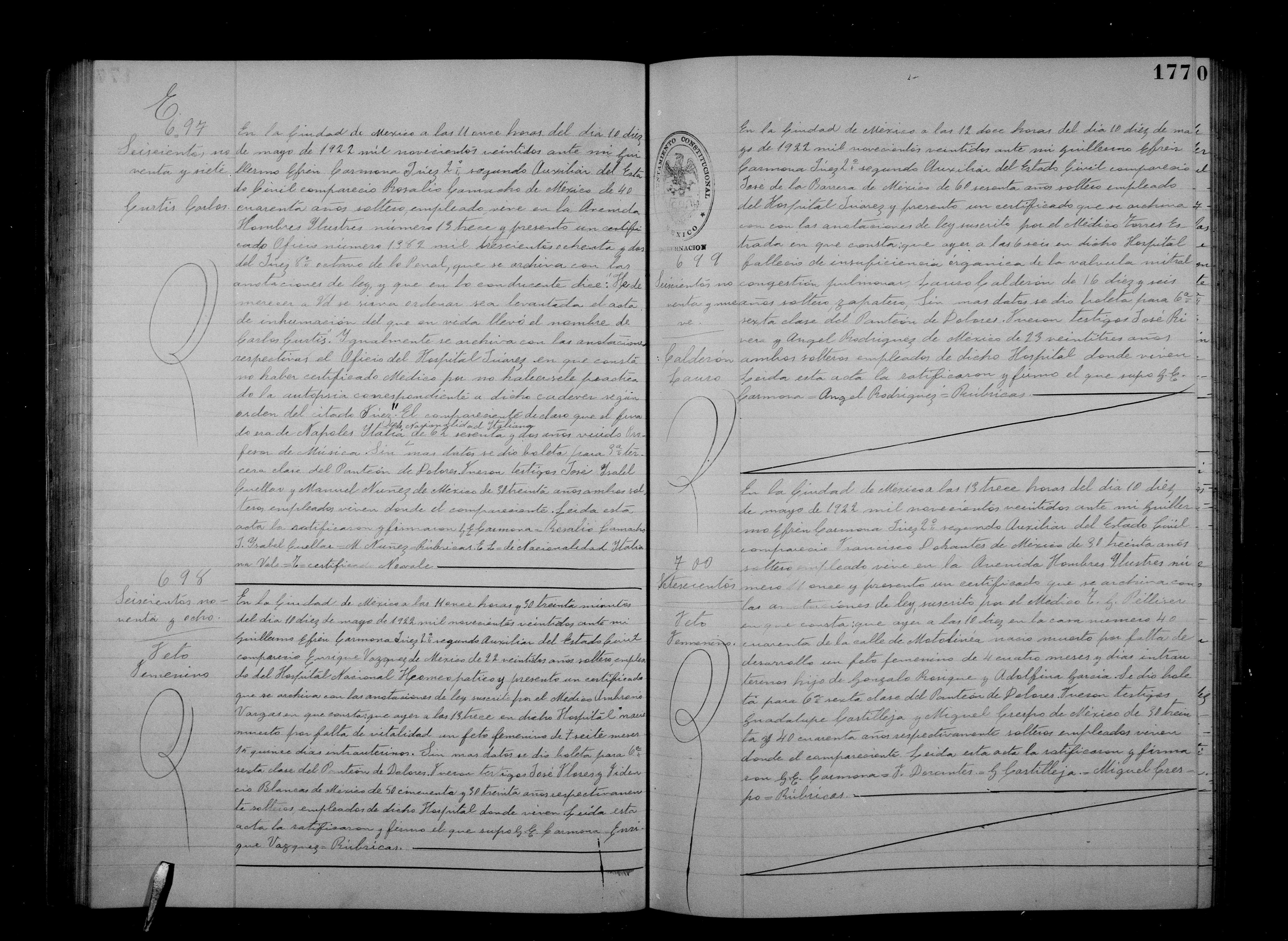
Death Certificate, Carlo Curti, México, Distrito Federal, Registro Civil, 10 May 1922. Curti's death has been widely published as sometime in 1926, but in fact he died 8 May 1922.

== See also ==
- List of mandolinists (sorted)
