= Spanish Students =

19th-century Spanish musical group

The Spanish Students: Estudiantina Fígaro; Estudiantina Española Fígaro
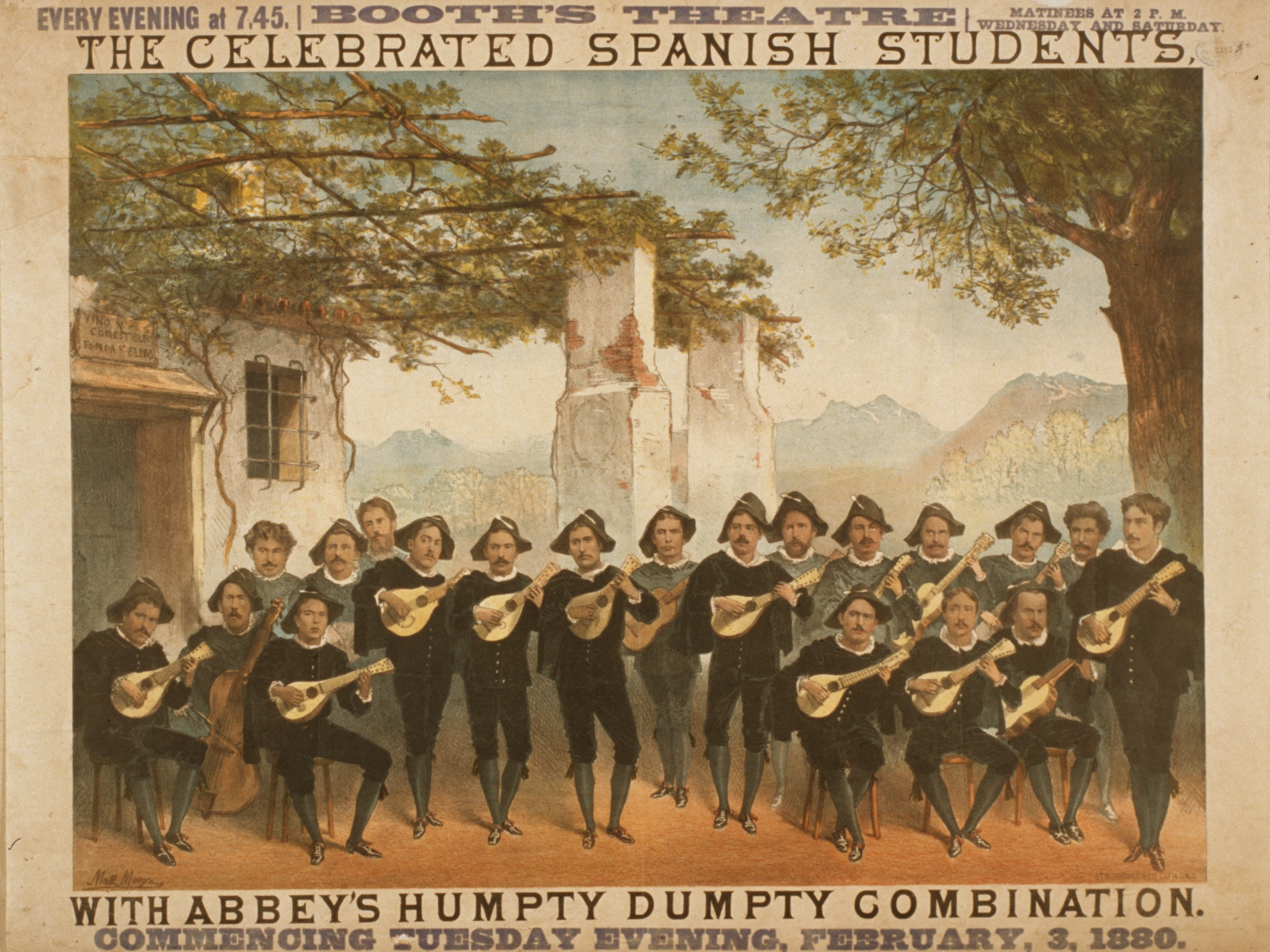
- Poster for a performance of The Spanish Students in Manhattan, New York, 1880.

Background information
- Origin: Madrid, Spain
- Genres: Spanish folk, classical
- Instruments: bandurria, guitar, violin, cello

The Spanish Students was a musical group from Madrid which popularized the tuna form of traditional student bands (Spanish: estudiantina). It gained international recognition after performing at the Carnival of Paris and the Paris Exposition of 1878. Under the name Estudiantina Española Fígaro, members of the original group toured France, Germany, Russia, Italy, Holland and England. After two years touring Europe, some members also toured North and South America in 1880.

The original group was founded by Ildefonso de Zabaleta in 1878. The group inspired many imitators, some of whom performed under the name Spanish Students or Española Fígaro, and some of the original 64 may have been in these groups. The Figaro Spanish Students led by Dionisio Granados helped lead to the popularization of the mandolin in Europe and America, and the formation of mandolin orchestras.

== Formation and European tour ==
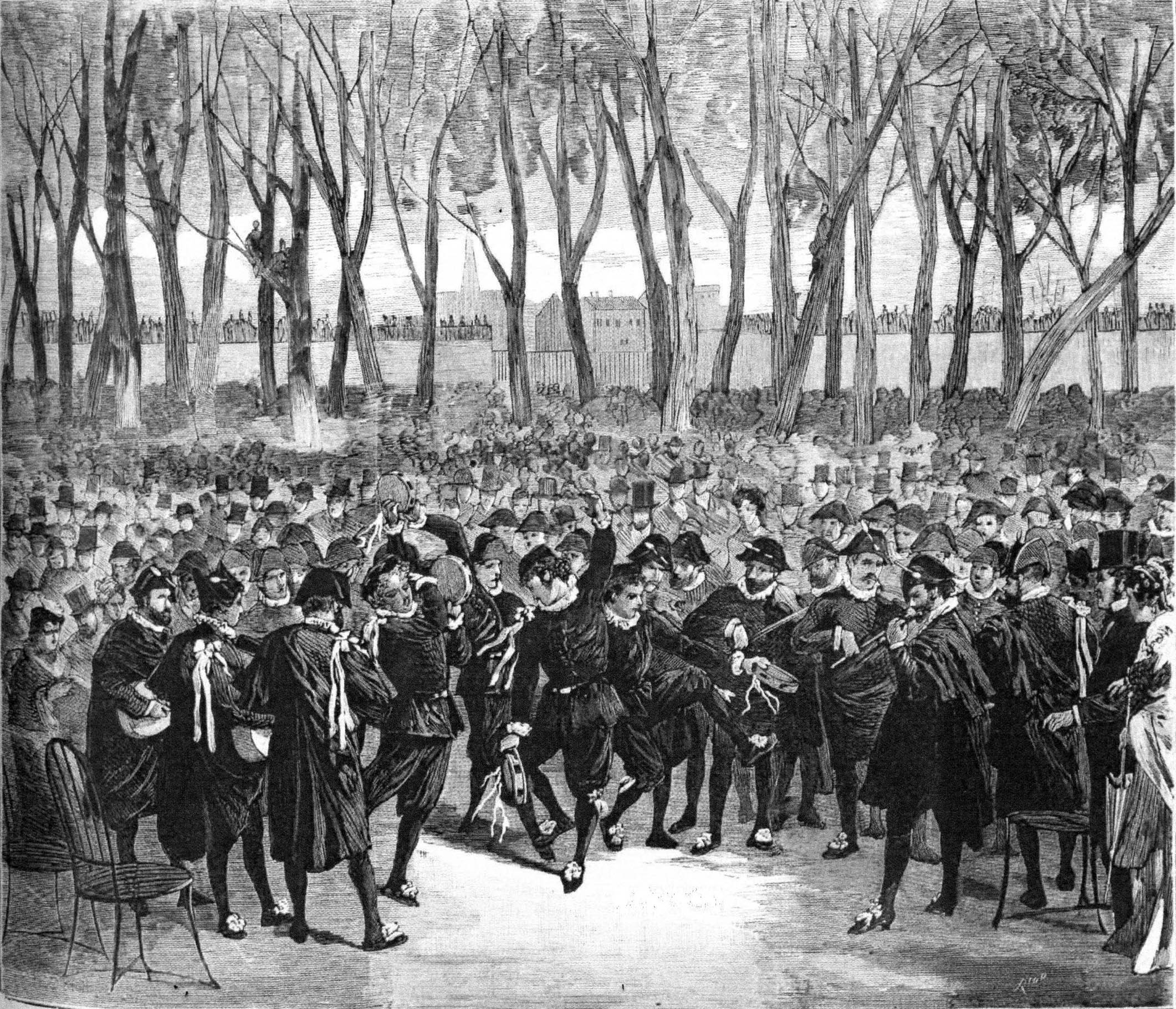
A Parisian crowd with the Estudiantina Española during Mardi Gras, 5 March 1878, at the Tuileries Gardens. Seven days later they attracted a crowd of 50,000 in the streets of Paris.

The original Estudiantes Española or Estudiantina Española was a group of 64 students formed by 26 February 1878, principally from Madrid colleges. They dressed in historical clothing, representing ancient sophists of Salamanca and Alcala and traveled to Paris for Carnival staying from March 2 through March 15. This early group of students played flutes, guitars violins, bandurrias, flutes and tambourines. This early group was led by Ildefonso de Zabaleta (president) and Joaquin de Castañeda (vice president). The group performed before large audiences in Paris (reports of 10,000 and 56,000 people showing up for a night's entertainment were reported).

Their success in Paris preceded a second group of Spanish performers, known as the Esudiantina Figaro or Esudiantina Española Figaroa (Figaro Band of Spanish Students). This group was founded by Dionisio Granados and toured Europe dancing and playing guitars, violins and the bandurria, which became confused with the mandolin. They performed in France, Germany, Russia, Italy, Holland and England..

== US tour ==
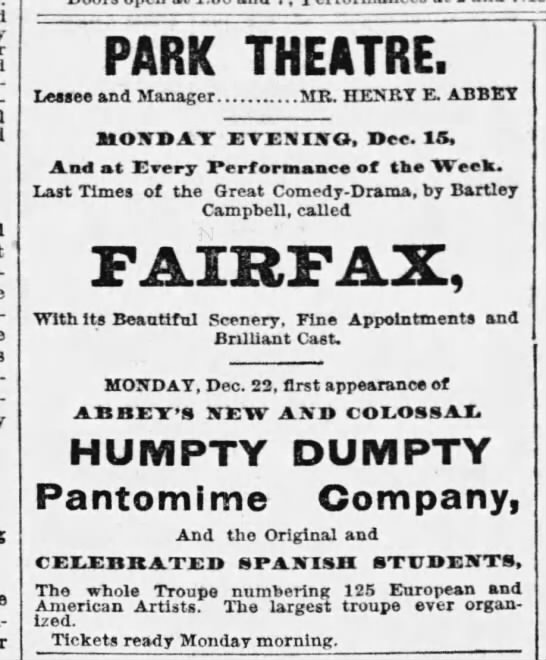
Abbey’s new colossal Humpty Dumpty Pantomime Company, advertisement for a December 22, 1879 performance in Boston, featuring 125 performers and the Spanish Students.

The Spanish Students were brought to the United States by Henry Eugene Abbey in January 1880, performing with his Humpty Dumpty Pantomime Company. They performed first in Boston then at Booth's Theatre in Manhattan. Their US touring group consisted of 20 men (15 musicians and 5 servants). Four or five played guitars, one played the cello, and the leader played the violin. The other nine played bandurrias, which US newspapers referred to as mandolins or Spanish mandolins.

== Influence ==
The Spanish Students created a sensation at the Paris Exposition, and popularized the tuna form of student performing groups. Their success spawned other groups who imitated their musical style and costumes.

Among the imitators were a wave of Italian mandolinists who toured Europe in the 1880s and 1890s, and the United States by the mid-1880s, playing and teaching their instrument. Thousands of young men and women took up the instrument as a pastime, and it became a symbol of society. The popularity of the mandolin reached its height just after the turn of the century. Mandolin orchestras were formed worldwide, incorporating the mandolin family of instruments and also guitars, double basses, and zithers.

The mandolin's popularity in the US was spurred by the success of the Spanish Students. An Italian musician, Carlo Curti, hastily started a musical ensemble after seeing them perform; his group of Italian-born Americans called themselves the "Original Spanish Students", anticipating that the American public could not tell the difference between the Spanish bandurrias and Italian mandolins. The imitators' use of mandolins helped to generate enormous public interest in an instrument that had been relatively unknown in the US.

== Members ==
It is difficult to ascertain the membership of the original group, as the name of the group has been used by many impostors (such as Carlo Curti), as well as splinter groups in which some of the members performed separately. The lists below are from specific tours or performances.

=== 1880 United States ===
After touring for almost two years in Europe, this group of the students came to the United States, touring well into 1881. Those arranging the US tour expected 22 musicians, but only these 15 were confirmed to have arrived at the port. News accounts of the performances report a group of consistent size. When reports mention the number of instruments, the number of guitars (either five or six) and mention of the violin or cello (or the base viola) varies.

- Ygnacio Martin, violin
- Gavino Lapuente, (president 1882)
- Valentin Caro, bandurria (1882)
- José Rodriguez, guitar
- José Garcia, bandurria (1882)
- José Fernandez, bandurria (1882)
- Melquiadez Hernandez
- Enrique Olibares, bandurria (1882)
- Antonio Carmona, bandurria (1882)
- Manuel Gonzalez, bandurria (1882)
- Miguel Justos, guitar
- Miguel Loper, guitar (1882)
- Eugenio Anton, guitar (1882)
- Juan Ripoll, violin (1882)
- Laureano Hernandez, guitar (1882)

=== 1883 ===
- Melquiades Hernandez
- Juan Arriaga, guitar
- Jose Garcia
- Pedro Merquita, bandurria
- Jose Rodrigues
- Manuel Argente
- Manuel Gonzales
- Lorenzo Hernandes
- Eugenie Auten
- Esteven Mastot, bandurria

== General references ==
- Tyler, James; Sparks, Paul (1996). "The Mandolin: Its Structure and Performance (Sixteenth to Twentieth Centuries)". Performance Practice Review. 9 (2).
- Sparks, Paul (2003). The Classical Mandolin. Oxford University Press. ISBN 9780195173376.
