= Heber Bartolome =

Filipino folk singer (1948–2021)

- Born: Heber Gonzalez Bartolome; November 4, 1948; Cabanatuan, Nueva Ecija, Philippines
- Died: November 15, 2021 (aged 73) Quezon City, Philippines
- Genres: Pinoy folk; Pinoy rock
- Occupations: Musician, singer-songwriter, guitarist, poet, painter
- Instruments: Vocals, guitar, bandurria, kubing
- Years active: 1960–2021
- Website: www.HeberBartolome.com

Heber Gonzalez Bartolome (November 9, 1948 – November 15, 2021) was a Filipino folk and rock singer, songwriter, composer, poet, guitarist, bandurria player, bluesman, and painter. His music was influenced by the "stylistic tradition" of Philippine folk and religious melodies. He was the founder of Banyuhay, a "protest band" that carried the trademark sound of the kubing, a native musical instrument in the Philippines. His compositions were described as a "unique synthesis of rock and blues, and Philippine ethnic rhythms". Bartolome's song "Nena" became a hit in 1977. His song "Tayo'y Mga Pinoy" ("We're Filipinos") was a finalist during the 1978 first Metro Manila Popular Music Festival.

== Biography ==
Bartolome was born in Cabanatuan in Nueva Ecija, Philippines, to Deogracias Bartolome and Angelina Gonzalez. Deogracias Bartolome was a pastor and violin and guitar maker, and a rondalla band leader while Angelina Gonzalez was a singer in the zarzuela. During his school days, Heber Bartolome was a member of the ROTC Band and the University of the Philippines Concert Chorus. Bartolome started his professional career in music in folk houses during the late 1960s. In 1973, Bartolome obtained the degree in Fine Arts from the University of the Philippines. He was a professor of Filipino Literature at the De La Salle University from 1981 to 1984. As a musician, he held performances throughout the Philippines. Abroad, he staged concerts in Australia and Europe. In 1993, he launched Mga Awit ni Heber ("Heber's Songs"), a collection of Bartolome's greatest songs. Apart from being a musician, Bartolome also exhibited artworks and was an active lobbyist for the rights of Filipino composers. He was the founder of the UP Astrological Society.

== Career in music ==
Bartolome's famous songs include "Pasahero" ("Passenger") (1977), "Almusal" ("Breakfast"), "Inutil na Gising" ("An Awake Fool") (1985), and "Karaniwang Tao" ("Ordinary Person") (1985). He was the songwriter of the tune for Bulwagang Gantimpala's Ibong Adarna, a 1989 musical drama with a libretto written by Rene O. Villanueva. Bartolome was a former member and trustee of the Filipino Society of Composers, Authors and Publishers, Inc. (FILSCAP), an organization in the Philippines responsible for collecting royalties for its members after holding public performances and for songs used on television and radio broadcast, movies and the like. FILSCAP's responsibility of royalty collecting extends to members of foreign affiliates such as the American Society of Composers, Authors, and Publishers (Ascap), Broadcast Music Inc. (BMI), Composers and Authors Society of Hong Kong (CASH), and more than fifty other organizations.

== Death ==
Bartolome died on November 15, 2021, 11 days after his 73rd birthday. In a June 2021 interview, he had said that he was sick, but did not elaborate.

== Discography ==
=== Albums (as Banyuhay ni Heber Bartolome) ===
- Tayo'y Mga Pinoy (Dyna Products, 1978)
- Kalamansi sa Sugat (Akasha Records, 1985)
- Katotohanan Lamang (Akasha Records, 1988)
- Kung Walang Pag-ibig sa Mga Magkarelasyon (Akasha Records, 1990)
- Tatlong Kahig, Isang Tuka (Akasha Records, 1992)
