= Colegio Mayor de San Bartolomé, Salamanca =

College in Salamanca, Spain

Colegio Mayor de San Bartolomé
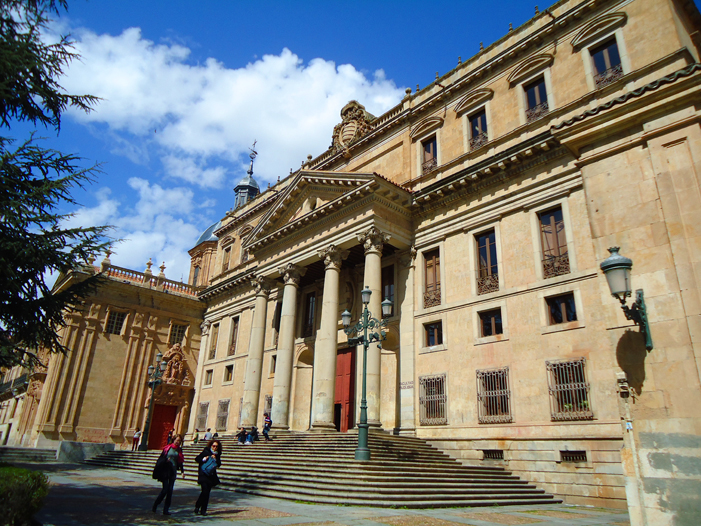
- The old building of the Colegio, or Palacio de Anaya, currently dedicated to Faculty.
- Formation: 1401
- Founder: Diego de Anaya Maldonado
- Type: Residential college
- Location: Spain
- Coordinates: 40.961622°N 5.665542°W

The Colegio Mayor de San Bartolomé, also formerly known as Colegio Mayor de Anaya or Colegio Viejo, is a colegio mayor (residential college) attached to the University of Salamanca and located in Salamanca (Spain).

== History ==
It was founded in 1401 by Don Diego de Anaya, as a residential college attached to the University of Salamanca and was the model for the other five classical colleges in Spain and for others in Spanish America. Anaya himself wrote its first statutes in 1405. The color of the robe and the beca of the students was brown. It was popularly known as Colegio de Anaya, after the name of its founder.

Although at the beginning, it was a foundation to allow low-income intelligent young students by the payment of their studies from a scholarship, the prestige that gave having studied in it or any other of the Colegios Mayores of Salamanca caused towards the end of the 16th century their places to beoccupied by the sons of noble or wealthy families, which significantly lowered the level of studies. The means used by the students to limit access only to nobles was to require "cleanliness of blood", which seemed designed to prevent the entry of descendants of Jewish converts but in reality prevented the entry of humble aspirants, who had no family records to prove their cleanliness of blood. For lower-class students, often servants of the nobles, an annexed hospedería was built.

Annexes to it were two other Colegios Menores: the one on Burgos (1520), which disappeared in the second half of the 17th century, and the one of St. Peter and St. Paul (suppressed in March 1563 by agreement of the students themselves).

The school was closed in 1798 and, although it had a brief period of rebirth around 1840, as a Scientific College, its headquarters were later used to expand the classrooms of the university and is currently the Faculty of Philology of the University of Salamanca.

The college was re-established as a dormitory on 19 February 1942 and later, on 16 December 2011, it resumed its status as a residential college. It currently occupies a recently constructed building, located next to the Miguel de Unamuno campus. It has the capacity to house 184 residents.

== The old building ==
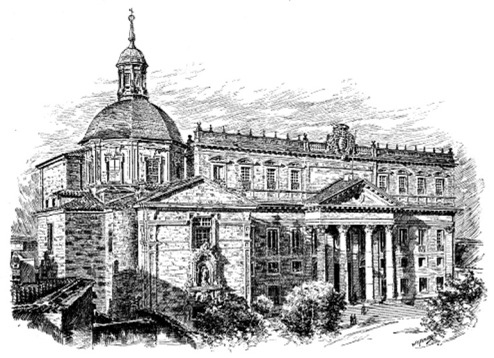
Drawing of the Colegio de Anaya with the Church of San Sebastián on the left (1889).

The original building, which was apparently made of brick and of modest construction, was badly damaged in the 1755 Lisbon earthquake and in its place was built the present building (called Palacio de Anaya), more in keeping with the lineage of the occupants of the time, which is one of the few neoclassical buildings in Salamanca. Its construction began in 1760, its creators were José de Hermosilla and Juan de Sagarvinaga. Its most striking elements are the facade and the imperial staircase inside the palace, where there is also an interesting bust of Miguel de Unamuno, made by Victorio Macho in 1930.

== Notable students ==
- Alonso Tostado
- St. John of Sahagún
- Diego Ramírez de Fuenleal (known as Diego Ramírez de Villaescusa, who founded the Colegio Mayor de Cuenca, in Salamanca, Spain.)
- Íñigo López de Mendoza y Zúñiga
- Antonio Zapata y Cisneros
- Juan Martínez Silíceo
