= Rondalla =

Spanish ensemble of stringed instruments

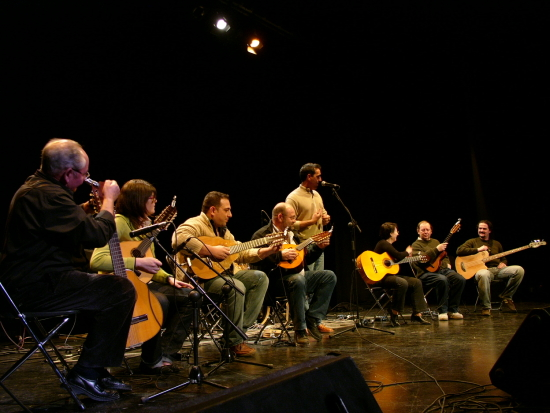
Valencian folk group 'La Rondalla de la Costera' performing live in Dénia.

The rondalla is an ensemble of stringed instruments played with the plectrum or pick and generally known as plectrum instruments. It originated in Medieval Spain, especially in the ancient Crown of Aragon: Catalonia, Aragon, Murcia, and Valencia. The tradition was later taken to Spanish America and the Philippines. The word rondalla is from the Spanish ronda, meaning "serenade."

== History ==
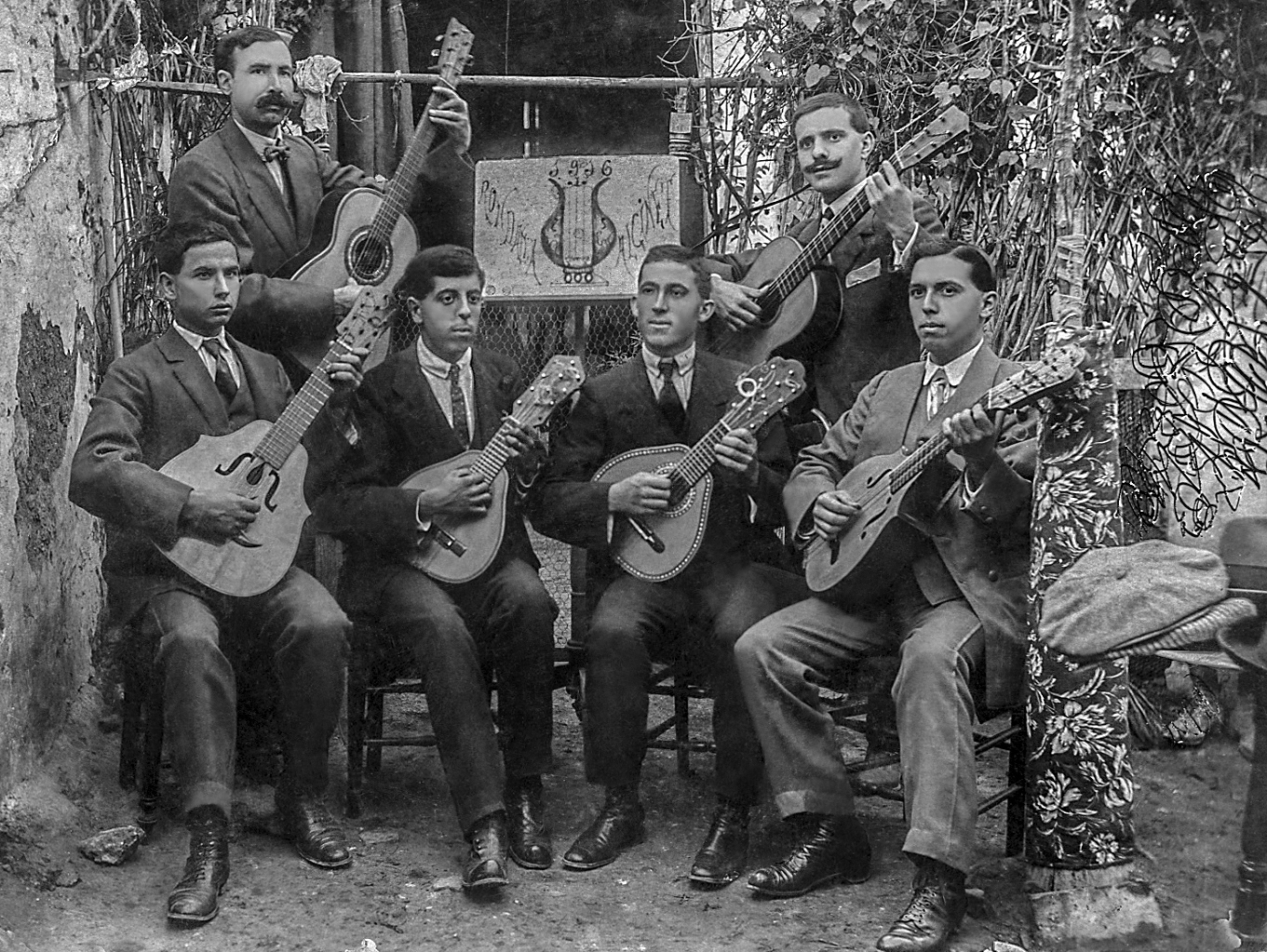
Rondalla Alginet, beginning 1900's

The rondalla has its origins in the folk playing bands from Spain that were forerunners of the present-day rondalla and included four types: groups of young men who played and sang regularly in front of homes, bands of musicians known as murza or murga who begged for alms, a group of musicians known as comparza who played on stage, and groups of university musicians known as estudiantina, dubbed “tuna”. The usual musical instruments used by estudiantina members were mandolins, violins, guitars, flutes, cellos, basses, tambourines, castanets, and triangles. Estudiantina musicians in Spain and Mexico, before and during the age of musical romanticism, wore 16th century attire such as "short velvet breeches, ornate shirts and a short cape with multicolored ribbons".

== Rondalla instruments in Spain ==
Some instruments used for the early rondalla were influenced by the Mozarab musical instruments of the time, including the guitars, flutes and vihuelas. Mandolins, castanets and tambourines were also used. Today a full range of instruments can be heard in Spanish rondalla, usually including the bandurria, laúd, guitar, and double bass, but sometimes also Mexican vihuela, violins, cellos, marimbas, xylophones, harps, and timbales.

== Rondallas in Spain, Mexico and the United States ==
Today, rondallas are more modern and expressive, using lyrics that are vibrant, yet still keep with the traditional theme of melancholy love and evening serenades.

Currently, there are many groups in Spain (such as La Rondalla Sierra Almijara and La Rondalla de la Costera), Mexico (such as La Rondalla de Saltillo and La Rondalla Voces del Corazón de Veracruz) and the United States (La Rondalla del Sagrado Corazón de Richmond) that carry on the tradition

== Rondallas in the Philippines ==
A Filipino rondalla performing a stylized version of the local folk song "Bahay Kubo"

The rondalla (also rondalya) was introduced to the Philippines when it was part of the Spanish East Indies. In the early Spanish period, certain styles were adopted by the natives, especially guitarra and bandurria used in the pandanggo, the jota, and the polka. The use of the term comparza was common, however, during the American period, the term rondalla became more used. The introduction of a Filipino rondalla piece is very similar to the introductory tunes found in Aragon.

Presently, the term in Filipino culture refers to any group of stringed instruments that are played using the plectrum or pick. The Filipino instruments are made from indigenous Philippine wood, and the plectrum or picks are traditionally made from tortoiseshell. Other stringed instruments composing the standard Filipino rondalla are the bandurria, the laúd, the octavina, the twelve-string guitar, the ukulele, the bajo de uñas or double bass, the guitarrón mexicano, and other Filipino-made instruments modeled and developed after the violin.

The Philippine rondalla's basic repertoire includes folk songs such as the "Collar de sampaguita", "La bella filipina", and "No te vayas a Zamboanga", as well as pieces from the types balitaw, kundiman, and the harana, pieces for the zarzuela, and accompaniment for dances such as the subli, tinikling, cariñosa.

Additionally, schools in the Philippines, most notably the ones under the SPA (Special Program in Arts) Curriculum as per guided by the Department of Education have established rondalla workshops for their music major students and some also choose to partake in the annual National Music Competitions for Young Artists (NAMCYA)

Some locally famous rondallas include:

- Musicondalla OPC
- Let's Play Rondalla, who broke the world record for the largest ensemble
- Dimiao Children's Rondalla
- Canossa-Tondo Children’s Foundation Inc. Rondalla (CTCFI)

== See also ==
- Bandurria
- Laúd
- Octavina
