= Esperanza Iris =

Mexican singer and stage actress

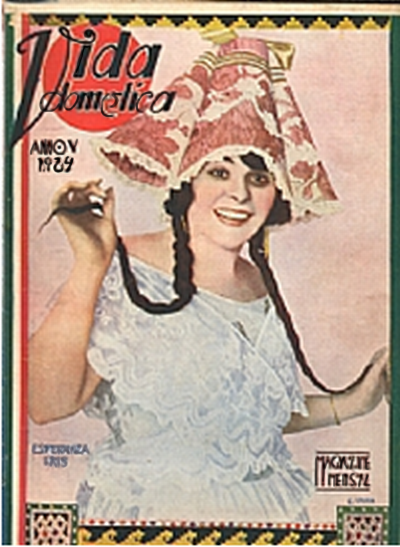
Esperanza Iris in a 1924 Brazilian magazine.

María Esperanza Bofill Ferrer (30 March 1888 – 7 November 1962), better known by her stage name Esperanza Iris, was a Mexican singer, leading lady, and stage actress.

== Early life ==
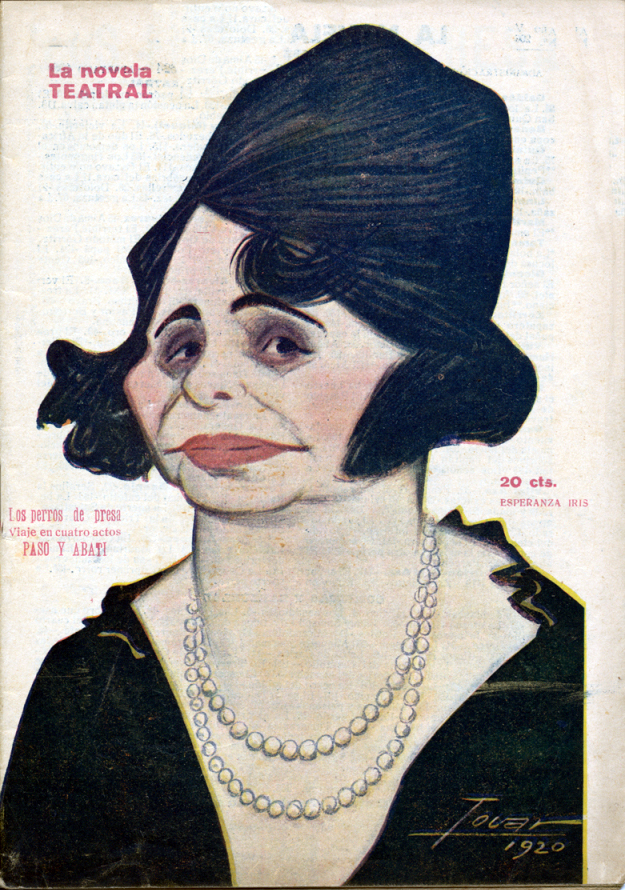
Caricature by Tovar

Born in Villahermosa, Tabasco, 30 March 1888, her birth name was María Esperanza Bofill Ferrer, but her stage name was Esperanza Iris.

She began her artistic career in the theater company Austri and Palacios in the play Les cloches de Corneville, which lasted for five years. Then in 1902 in the Teatro Principal she participated in Curti's La cuarta plana, for which she won the respect of the public. In Brazil she was named "the Queen of Operetta" and "Empress of Grace," and in Spain she was decorated by King Alfonso XIII. Iris went on an international tour to Cuba between 1910 and 1911 with the play The Merry Widow.

== Theater ==
In 1918 she constructed her own theater, the Gran Teatro Esperanza Iris, designed by architect Federico E. Mariscal. It was inaugurated in the presence of President Venustiano Carranza. In 1922 she was declared Hija Predilecta de México, or 'Favorite Daughter of Mexico' and filmed two movies: Mater nostra and Noches de gloria. She organized a choir in the Lecumberri Penitentiary when her husband Paco Sierra was a prisoner after an incident in 1952.

Her last theater performance was in the play The Merry Widow. Iris died on November 7, 1962, in Mexico City. Her remains were interred in the Panteón Jardín.

== Homage ==
To pay homage to her artistic career in Mexico, the state theater of Tabasco was rechristened Teatro Esperanza Iris. After a period in which the theater Iris built in Mexico City went only by Teatro de la Ciudad, during the government of Marcelo Ebrard it was returned to its original name: Teatro de la Ciudad Esperanza Iris. Mexico City's Historical Center was named a World Heritage Site in 1987 by the United Nations' Educational, Scientific, and Cultural Organization (UNESCO).

== See also ==
- Villahermosa
