= Tuna (music) =

Musical band of students

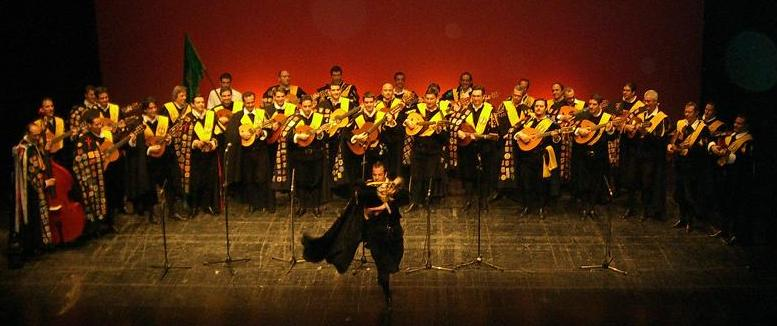
University Tuna of Seville

In Spain, Portugal and Latin American countries, a tuna is a group of university students in traditional university dress who play traditional instruments and sing serenades. The tradition originated in Spain and Portugal in the 13th century as a means of students to earn money or food. Nowadays students don't belong to a "tuna" for money or food; rather, they seek to keep a tradition alive, for fun, to travel a lot and to meet new people from other universities. A senior member of a tuna is a "tunante", but is usually known simply as a "tuno". The word "tuno" also refers to anyone who is a member of a tuna, although the first meaning is more common among tunas. New tuna members are known as "caloiros", "novatos" or "pardillos."

== History ==
The name tuna may come from French roi de Thunes, [king of Tunis], a title used by leaders of vagabonds. But there is also a legend of a real King of Tunis, known for his love of music and partying, who liked to walk around the streets at night playing and singing. That explains why the term roi de Thunes was applied.

In the old times (medieval days) the Sopistas (a sarcastic title meaning soup beggars) would use their musical talents to entertain people in exchange for a coin and a bowl of soup (sopa, in Portuguese and Spanish, hence the name sopistas). They would also play their music under the windows of the ladies they wished to court.

From its origins to the present day, the Tunas have continued the cultivation of popular instruments such as the bandurria, lute, guitar and tambourine, instruments which are named in the Spanish book Libro del Buen Amor by Juan Ruiz (c. 1283 - c. 1350).

For these occupations, they took their guitars and bandurrias and sang popular songs. The tunos or sopistas also showed abilities for music, and in courting ladies that they had been wooing to. The sopistas were poor students who, with their music, friendly personality and craftiness, scoured for cheap eats for a few coins in the eating-houses, convents, streets and squares.

=== Expansion into the Netherlands ===
In 1964, in Eindhoven, a number of students at the Eindhoven University of Technology came up with a new hazing prank: they had some incoming freshmen learn some Spanish songs and serenade a society lady in Eindhoven (possibly the lady in question was Mrs. Tromp, wife of the then-director of Philips). The serenading group was a hit and in 1964 the students founded Tuna Ciudad de Luz (Tuna of the City of Light, in reference to the importance of Philips Lighting to Eindhoven). Starting in 1965 Tuna Ciudad de Luz was invited to Madrid regularly for certamenes by several Spanish tunas; in order to return the favor, Ciudad de Luz, together with the female tuna "la Tuniña", started inviting the Spanish tunas to Eindhoven in 1986 (their 1986 certamen was the first ever held outside Spain).

Since then the tuna tradition has spread to several other universities in the Netherlands. There are currently five tunas in the Netherlands: Tuna Ciudad de Luz in Eindhoven, Tuna de la Ciudad Jarrera in Tilburg, Tuna Universitaria de Maastricht in Maastricht, Cuarentuna de Holanda (former students of Ciudad de Luz) and Tuna Veterana de La Haya (former student in The Hague). There are also three tunas for female students: La Tuniña in Eindhoven, Tuna Femenina de Maastricht in Maastricht, and Tuna Femenina Universitaria de Leiden in Leiden.

== Clothing ==
The clothing of the Tuna is derived from that of Iberian students of the 16th and 17th centuries. It is called a grillo in Spanish (meaning "cricket") or traje in Portuguese (meaning "clothing", in a traditional sense) and consists of a cloak, doublet, beca, shirt, stockings, baggy trousers or gregüescos and shoes or boots.

- The doublet is a tight-fitting jacket which is worn over a white shirt with big cuffs and collar, commonly finished at the corners.
- The shirt is always white with a generous collar and
- The pants are petticoat breeches or gregüescos normally short and wide, fitted at middle thigh, and tight Spanish breeches fitted under the knee.
- The shoes and tights are garments which cover the foot and the legs to waist.
- The beca is the band with a color identifying the university from which the wearer comes. It is worn on the breast and shoulder, over the doublet. The seal of the university is embroidered on the beca, which colour identifies the school, faculty or university of the Tuno. The Beca is a distinction received from the tuno's partners when they considered that the aspirant has reached a sufficient grade of experience.
- One important garment of the tuno is the cloak which is long and loose, without sleeves, open in front and it is worn over the clothes. Over the cloak are displayed seals and shields of the cities and countries that the tuno collected from all over the world. Likewise multicolored ribbons and shreds are worn on the cloak in a sign of affection, expressing feelings or love. These can be presents from their sweethearts, mothers or friends.

In theory, these cloaks (or "capas" in Portuguese and Spanish) could be used to evade getting caught busking by police, which in Medieval Portugal, was frowned upon.

Que cada cinta que adorna mi capa (Every ribbon that decorates my cloak)
Guarda un trocito de corazón. (keeps a piece of heart.)

— "Tuna Compostelana", D. Martinez Pinto & M. Menéndez Vigo

This applies to Spanish tunas. Portuguese tunas have more standard trajes: black trousers, jacket, cape and shoes, white shirt and black tie. Exceptions are the traje from the Universities of Algarve (blue instead of black and with a distinct hat, a nod to Henry the Navigator), Minho (which is more like the Spanish tunas' clothing described above) and Madeira (somewhat similar to Minho's).

== Musical instruments ==
As far as the music is concerned, there are two basic instruments. One is the guitar which comes with the tuno and his melody. The melody is created by voices and singing. Musical instruments like laúd and bandurria are also used. (Portuguese tunas usually play instruments like mandolin instead of bandurria and laúd). The other important instrument which characterized the student music was the tambourine.

Besides these basic instruments, the use of others instruments gives the tuno's music a very special richness. These elements were blended thanks to the different cultures and people where tunos perform. Among the distinguished instruments are the timple canario and charango. It uses, moreover, the Puerto Rican cuatro, accordion and double bass to increase the variety of sonority.

== See also ==
- Goliards
