= Bandolón =

Stringed musical instrument from Mexico

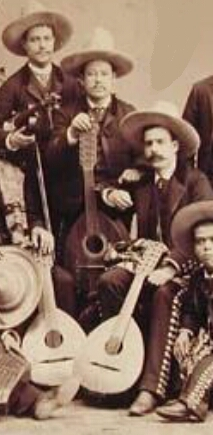
Three bandolóns in an 1885 photograph of Carlo Curti's Mexican Typical Orchestra taken on their tour in Columbus, Ohio.

A bandolón player with his 12-string bandolón, from a photo taken at the Pan American exposition, 1901.

A bandolón is a musical instrument from Mexico. It is a guitar sized instrument, resembling a flatback mandolin with 18 strings, arranged in 6 courses, three strings per course, and played with a pick. It is associated with the típica orquestra (typical orchestra) in Mexico, especially the 1884 Orquesta Típica Mexicana (Mexican Typical Orchestra), first organized by Carlo Curti.

Pictures such as the 1901 Mexican Typical Orchestra at the Pan-American Exposition show another variation, an instrument with 12 strings (one less string per course).

Whatever the resemblance to a flatback mandolin, there are differences: the mandolin is a smaller instrument, the soprano member of its family, tuned in fifths with the strings having the same tuning and range as the violin. The bandolón is closer to the bandurria, tuned in fourths with strings that have a range closer to the guitar's (having not only strings tuned to high notes approaching the mandolin's, but also low note strings, well below the mandolins range.)

When compared to the bandola it is very similar. The bandola also has the 12 and 18 string settings, tuned in fourths, especially the bandola andina colombiana.

Prominent players of the instrument include members of the 1884 Mexican Typical Orchestra: Andrés Díaz de la Vega. Pedro Zariñana, Mariano Pagani y Apolonio Domínguez, Vidal Ordaz, Vicente Solís and José Borbolla. One more modern player found on the internet is Gabriel Saucedo Villalobos.
