= Miguel Lerdo de Tejada (composer) =

Mexican musician

- Born: 29 September 1869; Morelia, Michoacán, Mexico
- Died: 25 May 1941 (aged 71)
- Genres: Light classical, zarzuela
- Occupations: Composer, pianist, conductor
- Instruments: Piano
- Years active: Late 19th century – 1941

Miguel Lerdo de Tejada (September 29, 1869 in Morelia – May 25, 1941) was a Mexican composer/songwriter, pianist, and conductor.

Lerdo de Tejada studied in Morelia and Mexico City. One of his most popular pieces was a song Perjura, with text by Fernando Luna y Drusina. His zarzuelas were also very popular in Mexico. He took his Orchesta Típica Lerdo (Carlo Curti's Mexican Typical Orchestra remade) and toured the United States; one of his performances was at the Pan-American Exposition in Buffalo, New York. He continued to tour with his own ensemble in the U.S., Cuba, and South America until his death.

His compositions are classed as "Light classical." He has been described as the first "popular composer" in Mexico. His works included many arrangements of traditional songs in addition to original works.

== Selected works ==
- Las luces de los ángeles, zarzuela
- Las dormilonas, zarzuela
- Esther, song (1895)
- Perjura, song (1901)
- Consentida, song (1901)
- Amparo, dedicated to Ramón Corral (1921)
- Paloma blanca, song (1921)
- Las golondrinas, song
- El faisan, waltz
- Tlálpam, intermezzo-two step, dedicated to the borough of Tlalpan, D.F. (1911)
