= Laúd =

Plucked string instrument from Spain

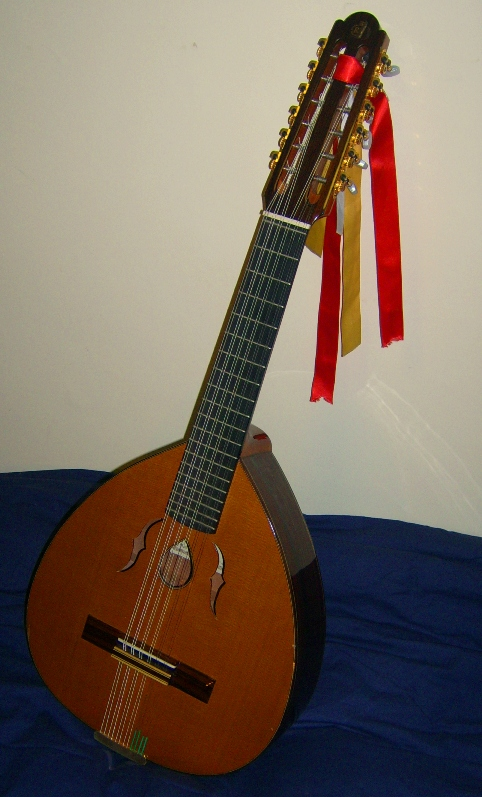

String instrument
- Classification: Plucked chordophone
- Hornbostel–Sachs classification: 321.321 and 321.322 (Necked bowl lute for roundback, necked box lute for flatback)

Related instruments
- bandurria, bandolón, mandolin, octavina,

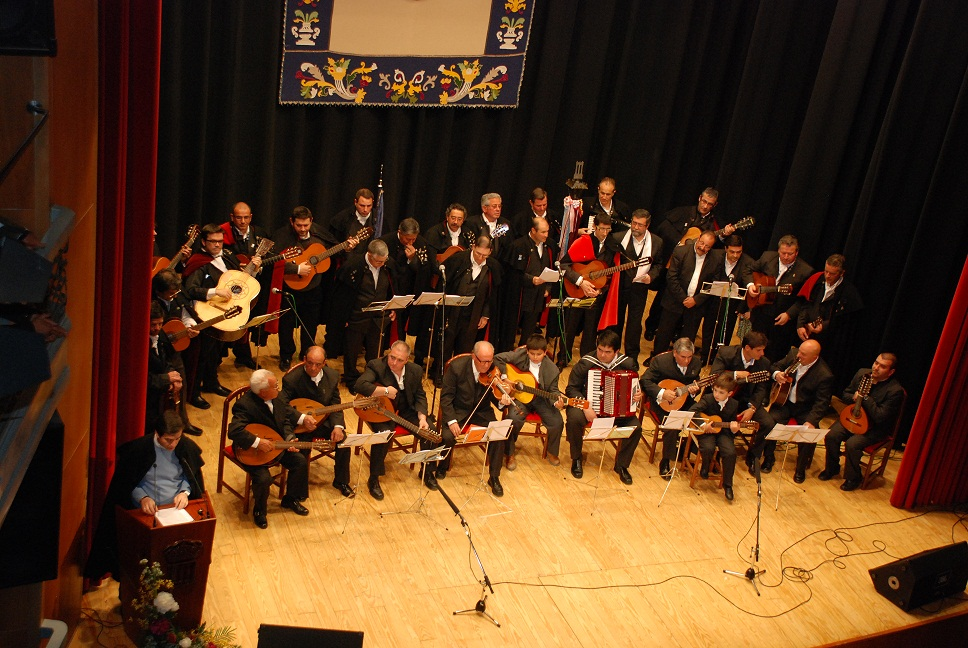
A rondalla with laudes included

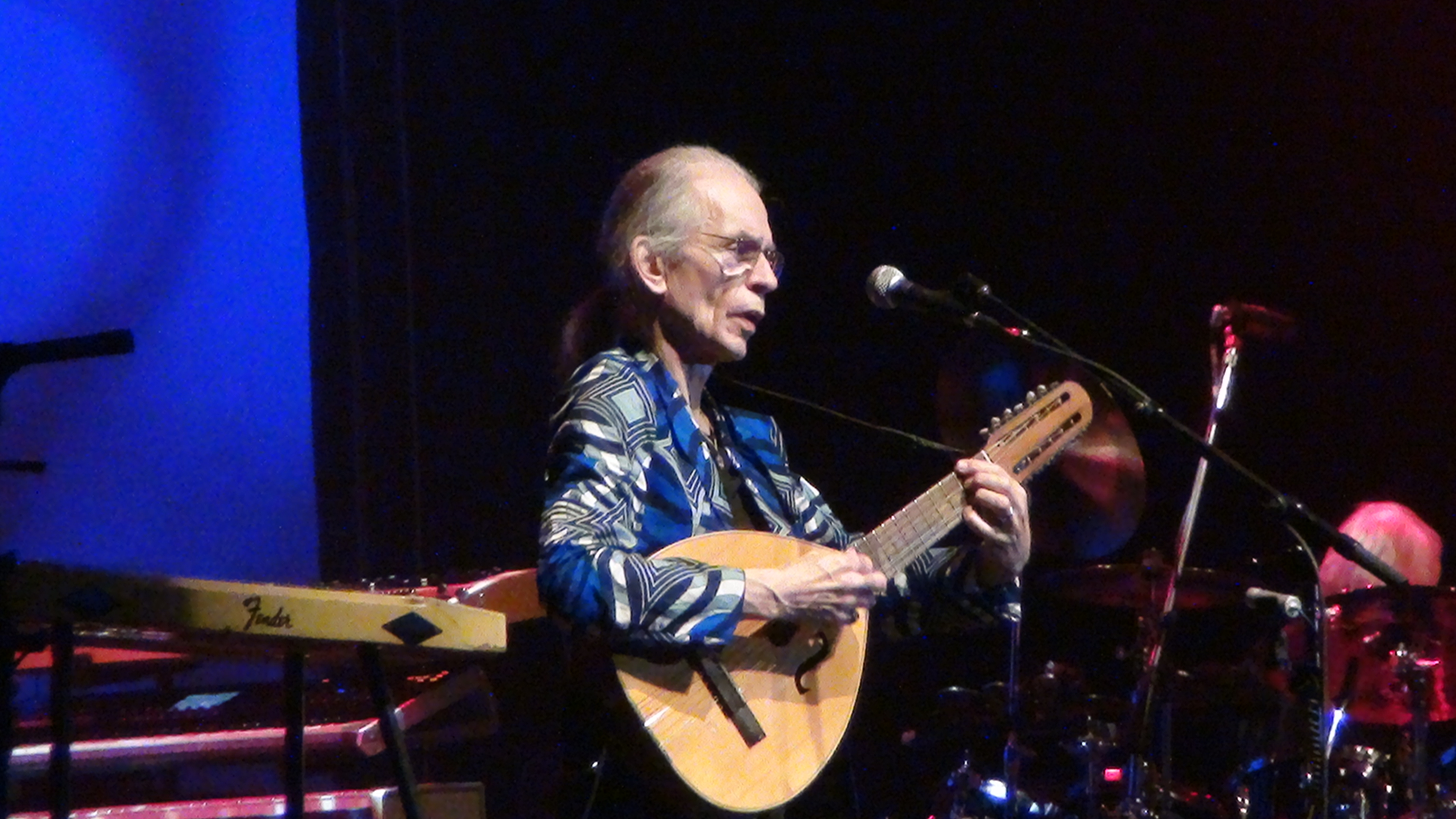
English musician Steve Howe playing the instrument at a Yes show in 2013

Laúd (Spanish: "lute") is a plectrum-plucked chordophone from Spain, played also in diaspora countries such as Cuba and the Philippines. Its name, just as lute itself, stems from Arabic al-oud العود, literally meaning “the wood”.

The laúd belongs to the cittern family of instruments. The Spanish and Cuban instruments have six double courses in unison (i.e. twelve strings in pairs); the Philippine instrument has 14 strings with some courses singled or tripled. A similar, but smaller instrument, with a shorter neck, is the bandurria, which also exists in 12- and 14-string versions.

Traditionally the laúd is used by folk string musical groups, such as Spanish or Filipino rondalla string ensembles, together with the guitar and the bandurria. Like the bandurria, it is tuned in fourths, but its range is one octave lower.

== Tuning ==
For the Spanish laud the tuning is:

- 1st: A4 A4
- 2nd: E4 E4
- 3rd: B3 B3
- 4th: F#3 F#3
- 5th: C#3 C#3
- 6th: G#2 G#2

The Cuban tuning is:

- 1st: D5 D5
- 2nd: A4 A4
- 3rd: E4 E4
- 4th: B3 B3
- 5th: F#3 F#3
- 6th: C#3 C#3 (or sometimes D3 D3)

The Filipino version, has (from bass to treble) one single course, two double courses and three triple courses (i.e. fourteen strings), and is tuned a step lower than the Spanish instrument.:

- 1st: G4 G4 G4
- 2nd: D4 D4 D4
- 3rd: A3 A3 A3
- 4th: E3 E3
- 5th: B2 B2
- 6th: F#2

Steve Howe plays a laúd in both the band Yes and as a solo artist, but he incorrectly refers to it in his guitar book as a Portuguese guitar. His tuning is:

- 1st: G#4 G#4
- 2nd: E4 E4
- 3rd: B3 B3
- 4th: E3 E4
- 5th: B2 B3
- 6th: E3 E4

== Cuban laúd ==
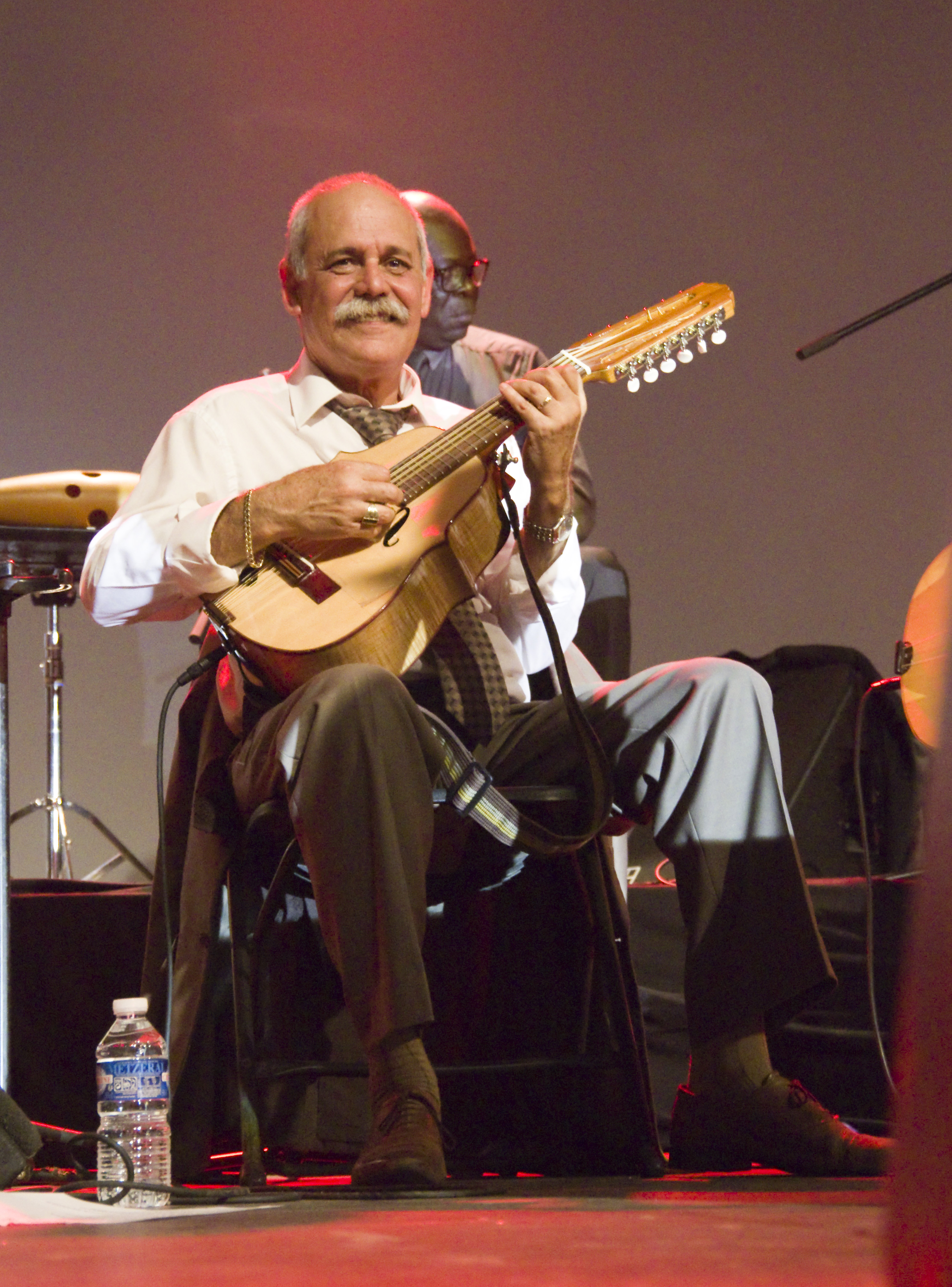
Barbarito Torres with his Cuban Laúd.

There is also a Cuban variety of laúd, called the "Cuban laúd" (played by, for example, Barbarito Torres of the Buena Vista Social Club). It has the same appearance and use as the Spanish version, six sets of doubled strings, but a shorter scale length and higher tuning. Sometimes the Cuban variety has a different body shape, with two points instead of the lute-style or wavy shapes used for the traditional Spanish variety. The tuning is:

- 1st: D5 D5
- 2nd: A4 A4
- 3rd: E4 E4
- 4th: B3 B3
- 5th: F#3 F#3
- 6th: D3 D3

== See also ==
- Rondalla
- Bandurria
- Octavina
