= Teatro de la Ciudad =

Theatre in Mexico City

Coordinates: 19°26′11.62″N 99°8′14.16″W

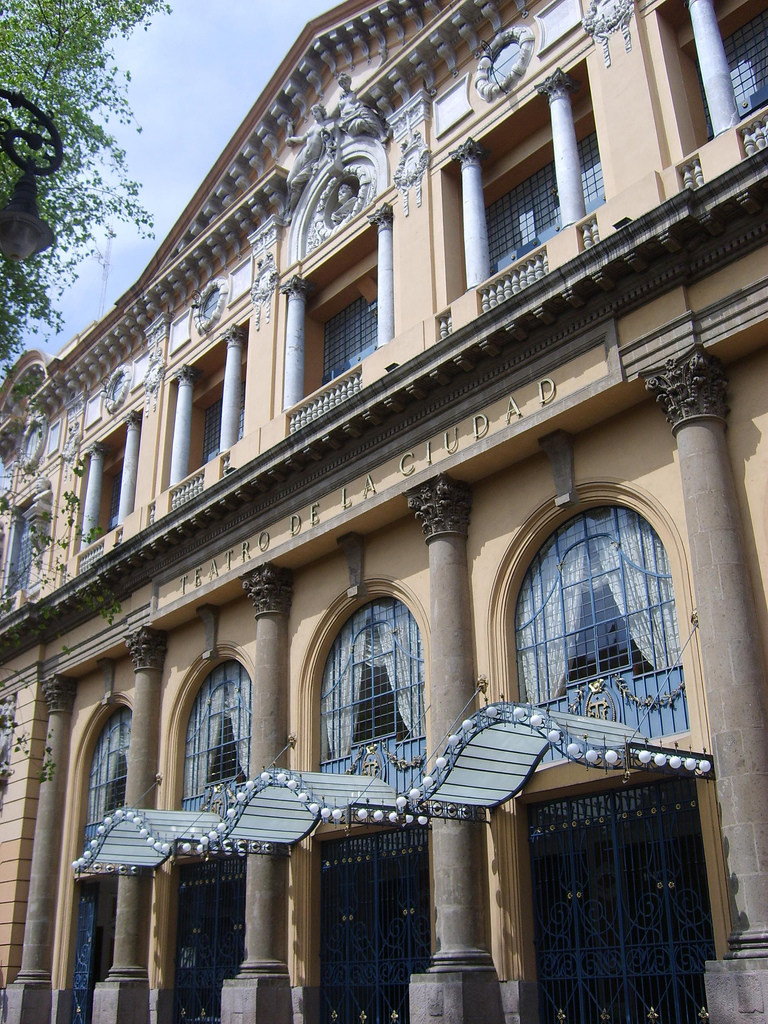
- Interactive map of Teatro de la Ciudad
- Address: Mexico City; Mexico
- Type: Theatre

Construction
- Opened: 1918

The Teatro de la Ciudad (Theater of the City) was built as the Teatro Esperanza Iris (Esperanza Iris Theatre) in 1918 and is now one of Mexico City’s public venues for cultural events. The theater is located in the historic center of Mexico City on Donceles Street 36.

== The former Esperanza Iris Theatre ==
The current theater building was constructed in 1918, on the site of the prior Teatro Xicoténcatl. It was originally named after diva Esperanza Iris. Iris, born María Esperanza Bonfil, was an operetta singer from the state of Tabasco active in the early 20th century. Her career was most successful in Mexico City, Havana and Madrid, but she toured extensively in the Americas. Some of her best known works are The Merry Widow, The Count of Luxembourg and La princesa del dólar. She also acted in a number of films in the 1930s.

The theatre was partially funded by Iris, from earnings from a recent tour. The architects were Capetillo Servín and Federico Mariscal who based the work on the La Scala opera house in Milan, Italy. The theatre was opened on 25 May 1918, two days after the Mexican singer returned from South America. The event was attended by President Venustiano Carranza and his cabinet. The opening work was a staging of the play La Duquesa del Bal-Tabarín and Iris herself sang some of the musical numbers. After its opening, it was the most important cultural venue in the city, until the long-postponed opening of the Palacio de Bellas Artes in the 1930s. Despite the ongoing war in Mexico, Iris manage to attract a number of international stars to the theatre, including Enrico Caruso and Anna Pavlova.

== As the city theatre ==
Iris lived in the foyer of the building for some time during her life and had her own private box for viewing productions in which she was not a part. However, by the time Iris died in 1962, the theater was practically abandoned. In 1976, the theater became the property of the city to use for the promotion of cultural events, changing the name to the Teatro de la Ciudad.

Initial efforts to remodel the theater led to a fire caused by an electrical spark. This fire destroyed a large portion of the building, and it was completely shut down until restoration work was reinitiated in 1999. This work continued until 2002. The infrastructure was reinforced. All of the decorated elements such as columns, sculptures, facade and main stage were either replaced or extensively remodeled. In addition, technical aspects of the theatre were modernized and some acoustic problems were remedied.

In 2008, the city returned the name of Esperanza Iris to the theater's name and added a space for cabaret productions as well. Today, the theater hosts concerts and presentation by individual artists and groups from Mexico and other countries. Some of these include Pablo Milanés, Ballet Nacional de Cuba, Betsy Pecdanins, Lila Downs and Alberto Cortez. In May 2010, the theater's 92nd anniversary was celebrated with Mexico's traditional birthday song, "Las Mañanitas", music by the Barandela Big Band, and members of the theatrical community and the public. The celebration was also part of Mexico's Bicentennial celebrations.
