= Salterio =

Type of zither

Salterio is the Romance term matching with the psaltery via Italian, Spanish, and Portuguese; but also refers to the hammered dulcimer; both are types of zithers.

== Concept, etymology ==
'Salterio' / 'saltério' is used in Italian and Spanish where both 'psaltery' and 'dulcimer' are used in Spanish, 'psaltérion' and 'tympanon' in French, 'psalterium' in Latin. There has always been cross-over between the various terms, and it is only in the last 100 years that scholars have tried to distinguish between them, proposing that a 'psaltery' is plucked while a 'dulcimer' is hit, and that both belong to a generic 'zither' family (distinct from specific instruments called 'zither' by their players); but this usage is an abstraction and has no basis in the traditional use of these names: there are plenty of illustrations where psalteries are hit and traditions where dulcimers are plucked. The point is rather that a distinct type evolved from about 1500 in which the strings were placed in different planes, presumably to make it easier to distinguish between them when they are hit with a hammer, but after that they were still plucked in many playing traditions.

== Italy ==
Paul Gifford and Karl-Heinz Schickhaus have researched the salterio in 18th century Italy; there are instruments with up to eight strings per course (i.e. 8 strings tuned to the same note and played all together, like a 12-string guitar or the middle and upper notes of a piano), made in places like Venice, Florence, Brescia, Milan, and Triente, and signed by ten different makers. Instruments and tuning diagrams show up to five bridges and fully chromatic tuning. They were used in upper-class circles for composed music like sinfonia and sonata. A salterio was bought for the Ospedale della Pietà when Antonio Vivaldi was working there; it cost more than a cheap violin, less than an expensive one. Some early 20th century writers suggest that the dulcimer in Italy was called salterio tedesco ("German psaltery"), but it is clear from Bonanni's Gabinetto Armonico that the normal word is simply salterio and that his illustration called salterio tedesco is of a German beggar girl who played one in the streets of Rome.

== Spain ==
Pablo Minguet y Yrol's Reglas y advertencias ... (Madrid 1752) shows a salterio-player playing a dance tune from written music; and in the opera Los amantes chasqueados from 1779, the soprano soloist Maria Guerrero played a salterio on stage while singing: she was evidently highly competent, if not a virtuoso. An instrument in Brussels is identified as coming from the Canary Islands and having been made in Barcelona in 1779.

== Mexico ==
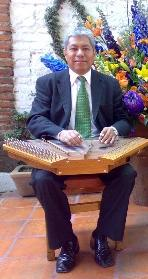
Salterist

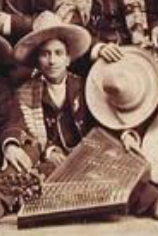
A salterio player from the Mexican Typical Orchestra c. 1885, taken in Columbus, Ohio

The salterio, with origins in the 16th century psaltery, is still occasionally played in live performances. Mexican psaltery has a trapezoidal form, is manufactured with wood, and is double and triple stringed. On the top board, five bridges are placed in order to seat stretched metal strings across from side to side. The strings are plucked with a metal pick adjusted on the index finger of each hand.

There are salterios of various sizes, up to one meter long, with tessitura of tenor, soprano and requinto. The salterio requinto has 90 strings in 3 course, with a range from Si4 to Fa#9. The salterio tenor has more than 100 strings in 3-4 course order, with a range from Si3 to Fa#8.

== Brazil ==
Rogério Budasz has published a beautiful facsimile of Antonio Vieira dos Santos manuscript from about 1820 Cifras de música para saltério, together with a transcription, analysis and bibliography (ISBN 85-7335-078-4).

== See also ==
- Psalterium

== Bibliography ==
- Gifford, Paul M. The Hammered Dulcimer: A History. Scarecrow Press, 2001.
