= Beca (garment) =

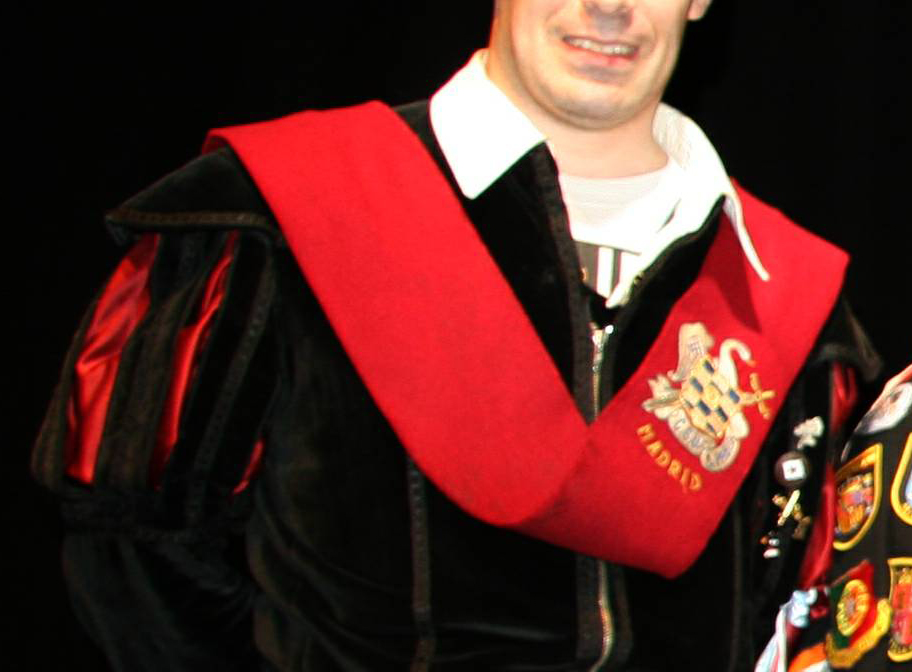
The Beca in different colors identifies the University and his/her University Tuna.

The beca is worn on the breast and shoulder, over the doublet. The colors of the beca and the coat of arms embroidered on it identify the university and school or faculty that the tuno belongs to. The beca is given to the tuno by his companions when they consider that he has enough experience, and is fit to represent his University Tuna and, by extension, his/her university.

== Bibliography ==
- Luis Enrique Rodríguez-San Pedro Bezares. Historia de la Universidad de Salamanca: Estructuras y flujos. Ediciones Universidad de Salamanca, 2004.
