= Milwaukee Mandolin Orchestra =

The Milwaukee Mandolin Orchestra (MMO), also known as The Bonne Amie Musical Circle, is a mandolin ensemble which was established in 1900 in Milwaukee, Wisconsin. They are the oldest ensemble of their kind in the United States.

Waltzes, marches, polkas and tangos are the main tunes played by MMO. Its repertoire also includes Italian, Latin, light classical, and also modern songs. The ensemble plays mostly at Wisconsin's concert halls and music festivals, sometimes at other states in the US, and internationally as well.

== History ==
The group was founded in 1900 as the Bonne Amie Musical Circle. It reformed in 1982 under the Milwaukee Mandolin Orchestra name. As late as 1990, under the direction of Ernest Brusubardis, the group had only 11 members. Starting in the 1990s the group expanded, playing public concerts in other major cities and releasing recorded music. In a review of the concert in 2000 celebrating the group's centennial, Elaine Schmidt of the Milwaukee Journal Sentinel described them as "not the tightest ensemble in town, nor the most polished." The orchestra was a guest on A Prairie Home Companion twice in 2006. One member, Jacob Scokir, played with the group from 1938 until his death in 2008.
