= Bandurria =

Plucked chordophone from Spain

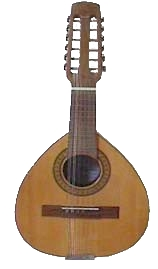

String instrument
- Classification: Plucked chordophone
- Hornbostel–Sachs classification: 321.321 and 321.322 (Necked bowl lute for roundback, necked box lute for flatback)

Playing range
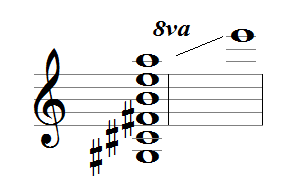

Related instruments
- Bandola, laúd, mandolin, octavina

The bandurria is a plucked chordophone from Spain, similar to the mandolin and bandola, primarily used in Spanish folk music, but also found in former Spanish colonies.

== Instrument development ==
Prior to the 18th century, the bandurria had a round back, similar or related to the mandore. It had become a flat-backed instrument by the 18th century, with five double courses of strings, tuned in fourths. The original bandurrias of the Medieval period had three strings. During the Renaissance they gained a fourth string. During the Baroque period the bandurria had 10 strings (5 pairs).

The modern bandurria has 12 strings (6 pairs). The strings are tuned in unison pairs, going up in fourths from the low G♯. The lowest four strings are a major-third above those of a standard guitar and the highest two strings are a fourth above a standard guitar, i.e. G♯, c♯, f♯, b, e' and a'.

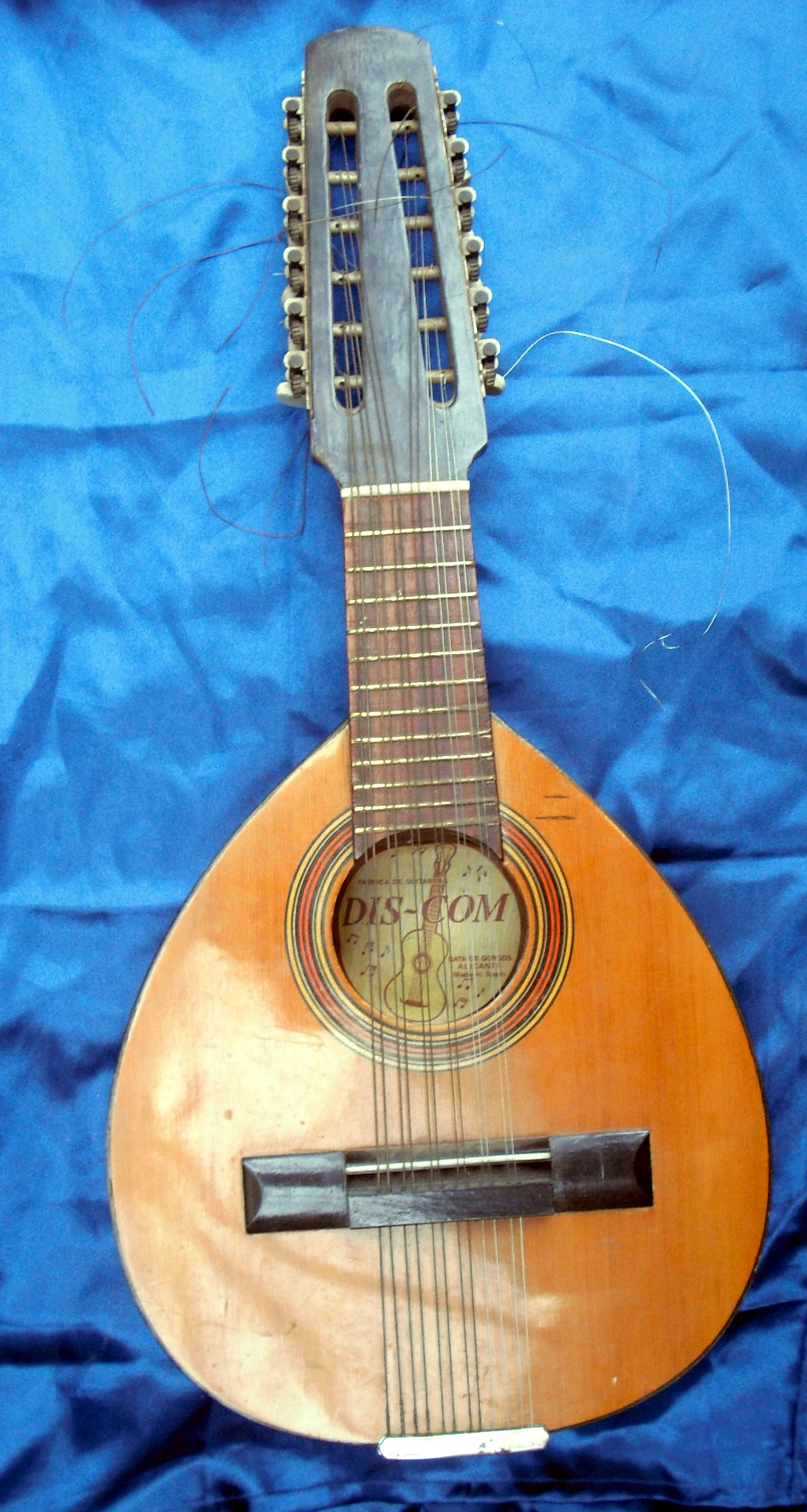
Bandurria (front view)

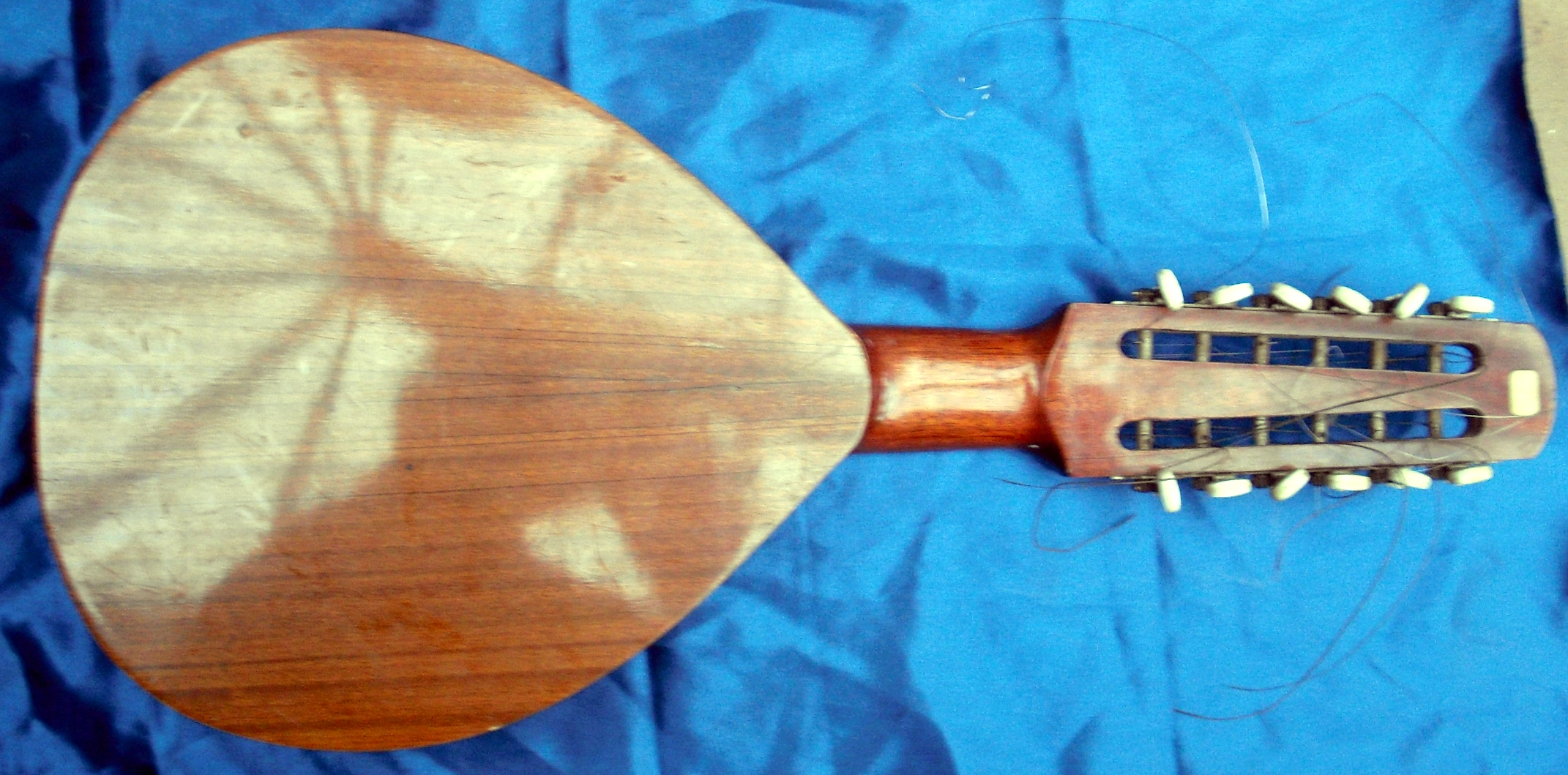
Bandurria (back view)

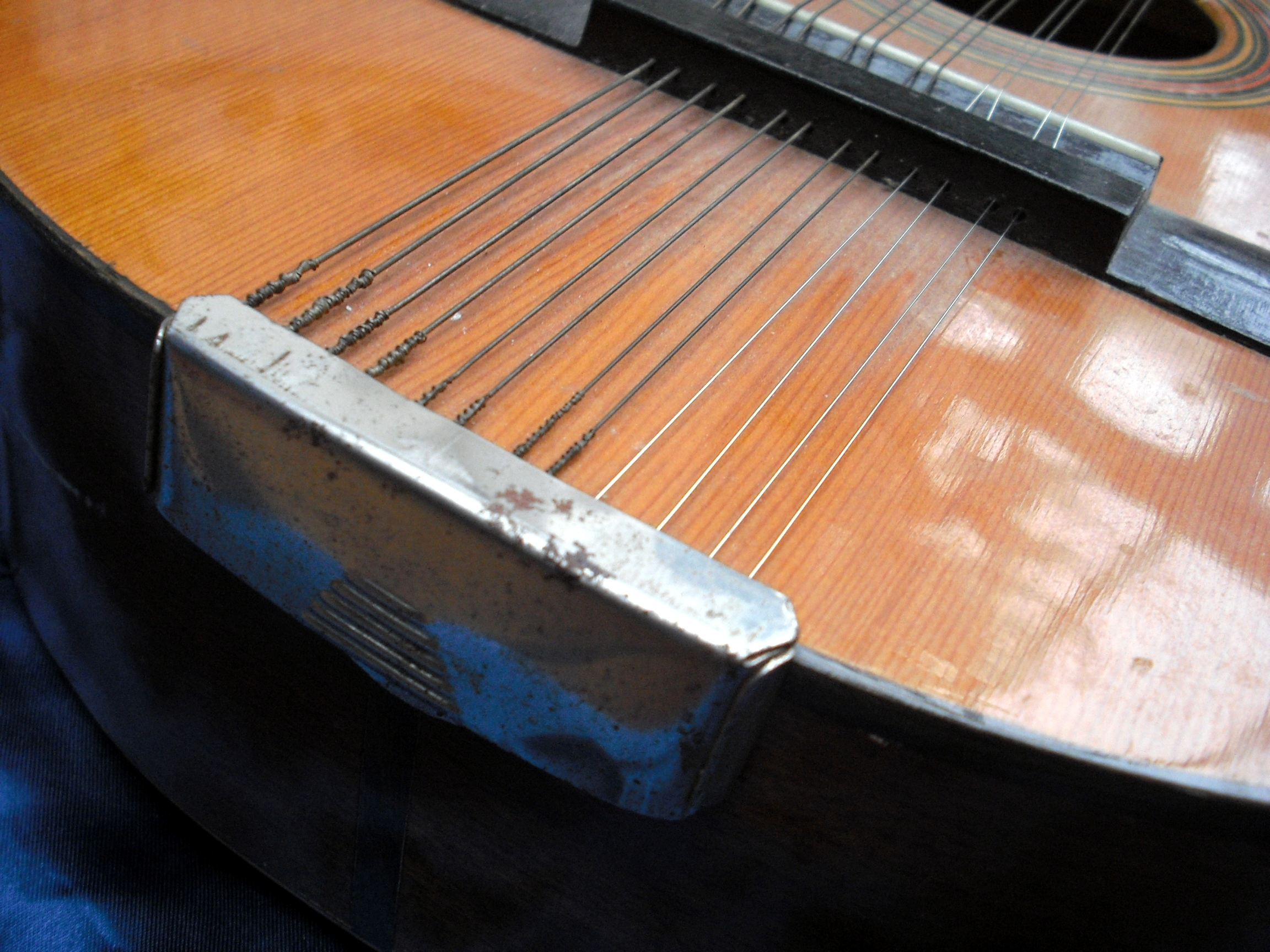
Bandurria (tailpiece)

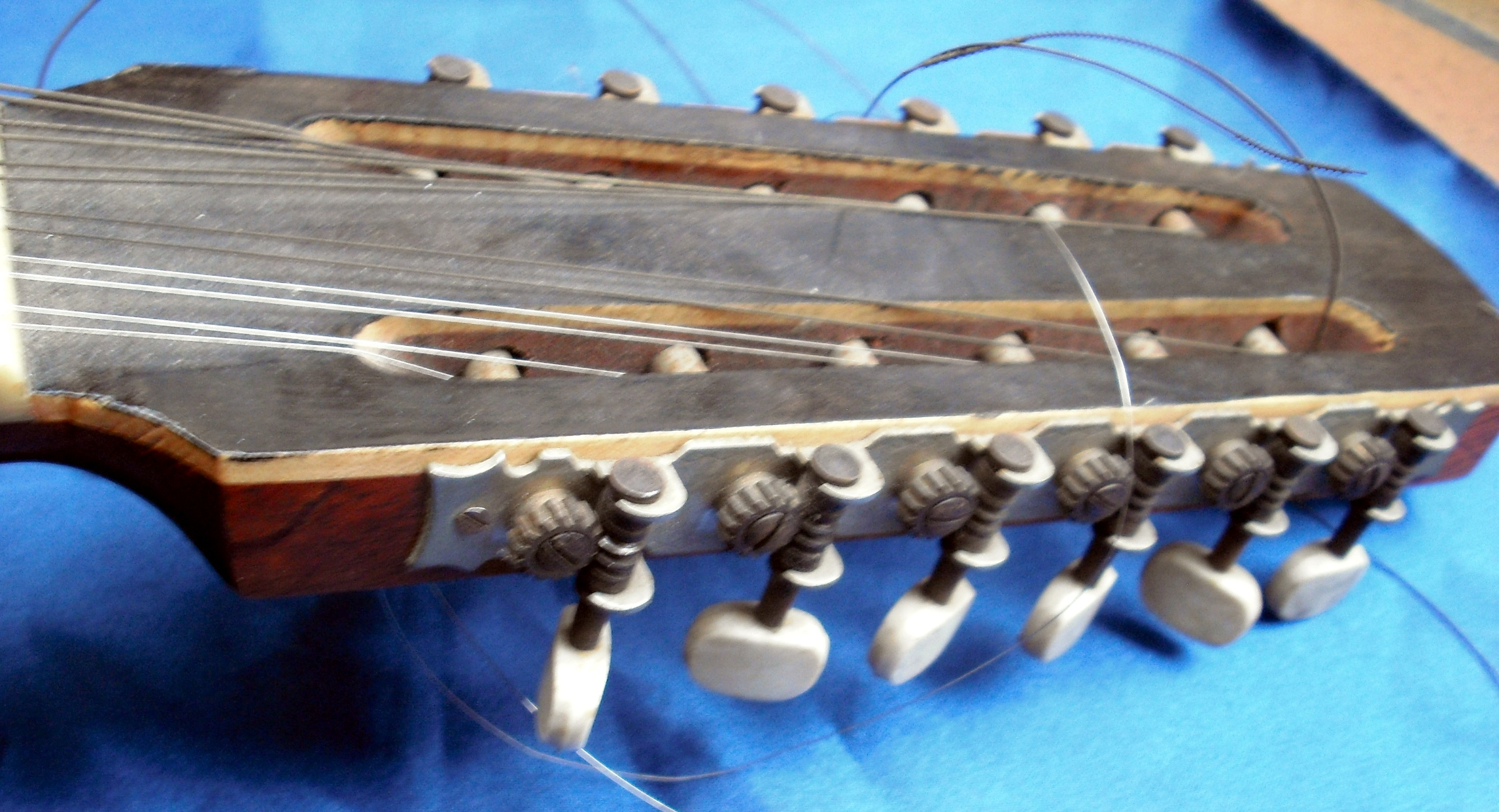
Bandurria (tuning head)

== Variations and uses in different parts of the world ==
=== Spain ===
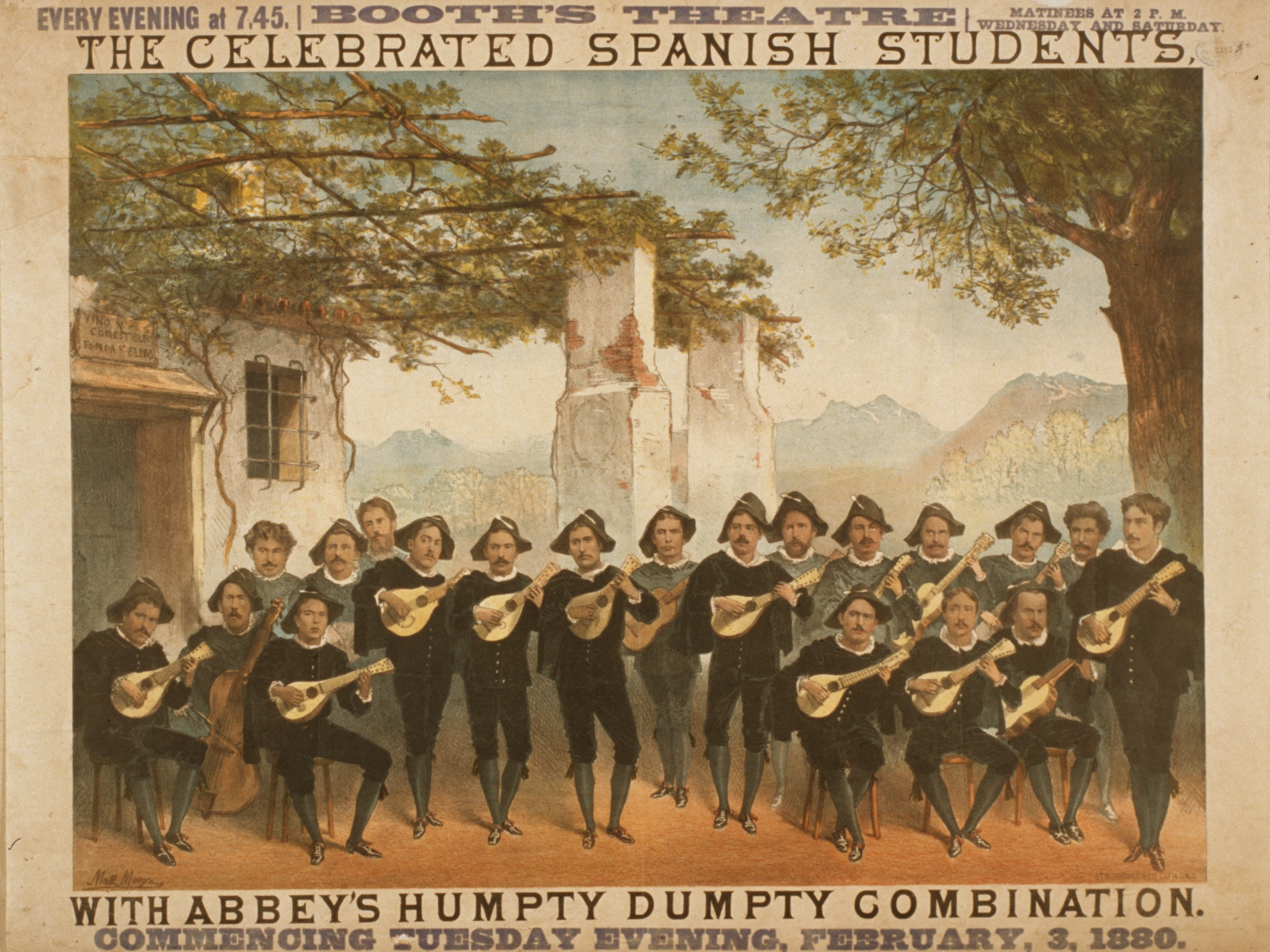
The Spanish Students, who were first brought to the United States by Henry Eugene Abbey's firm in 1880. They played bandurrias, but confusion in the United States led people to believe the instruments were mandolins. This poster was for a Manhattan performance at the Booth's Theatre on the corner of 6th Avenue and 23rd Street in Manhattan.

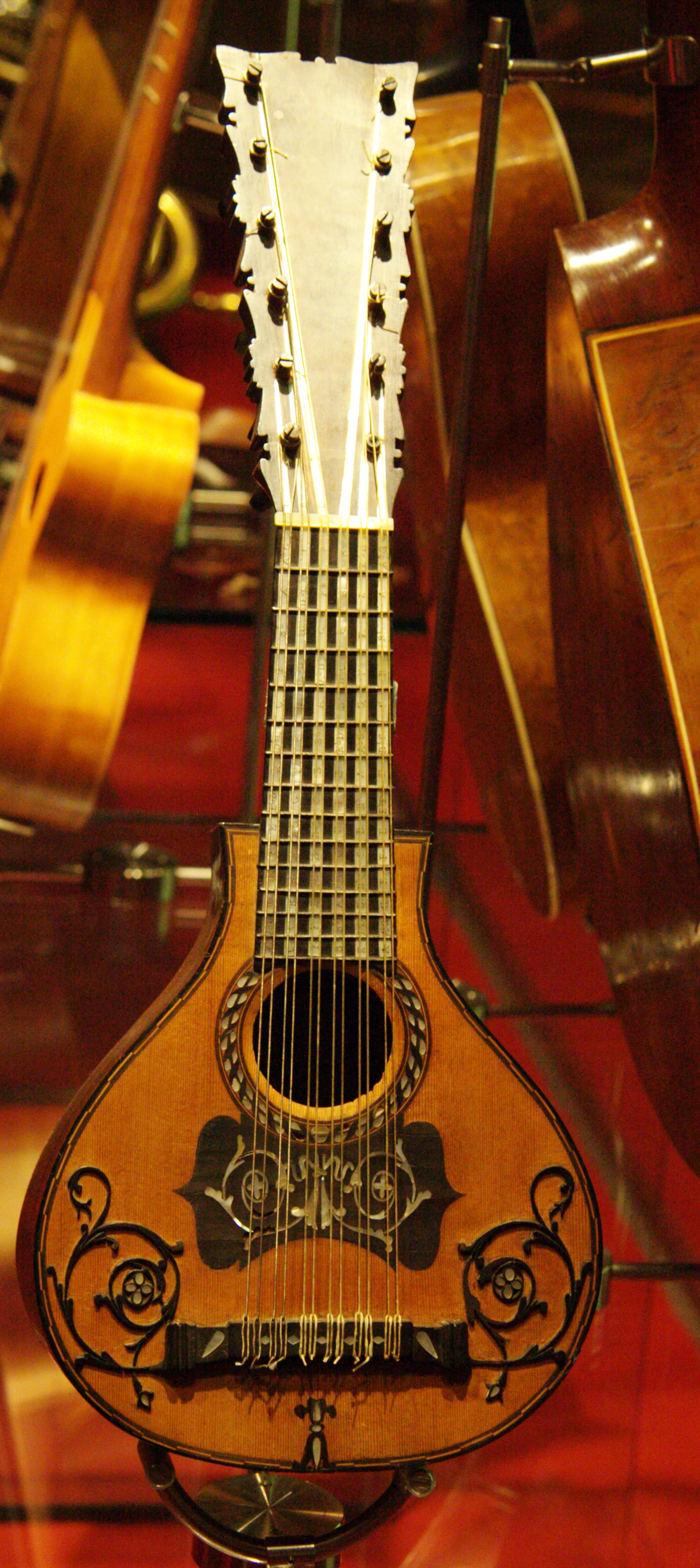
Bandurria with square shoulders, Museum of Music, Barcelona.

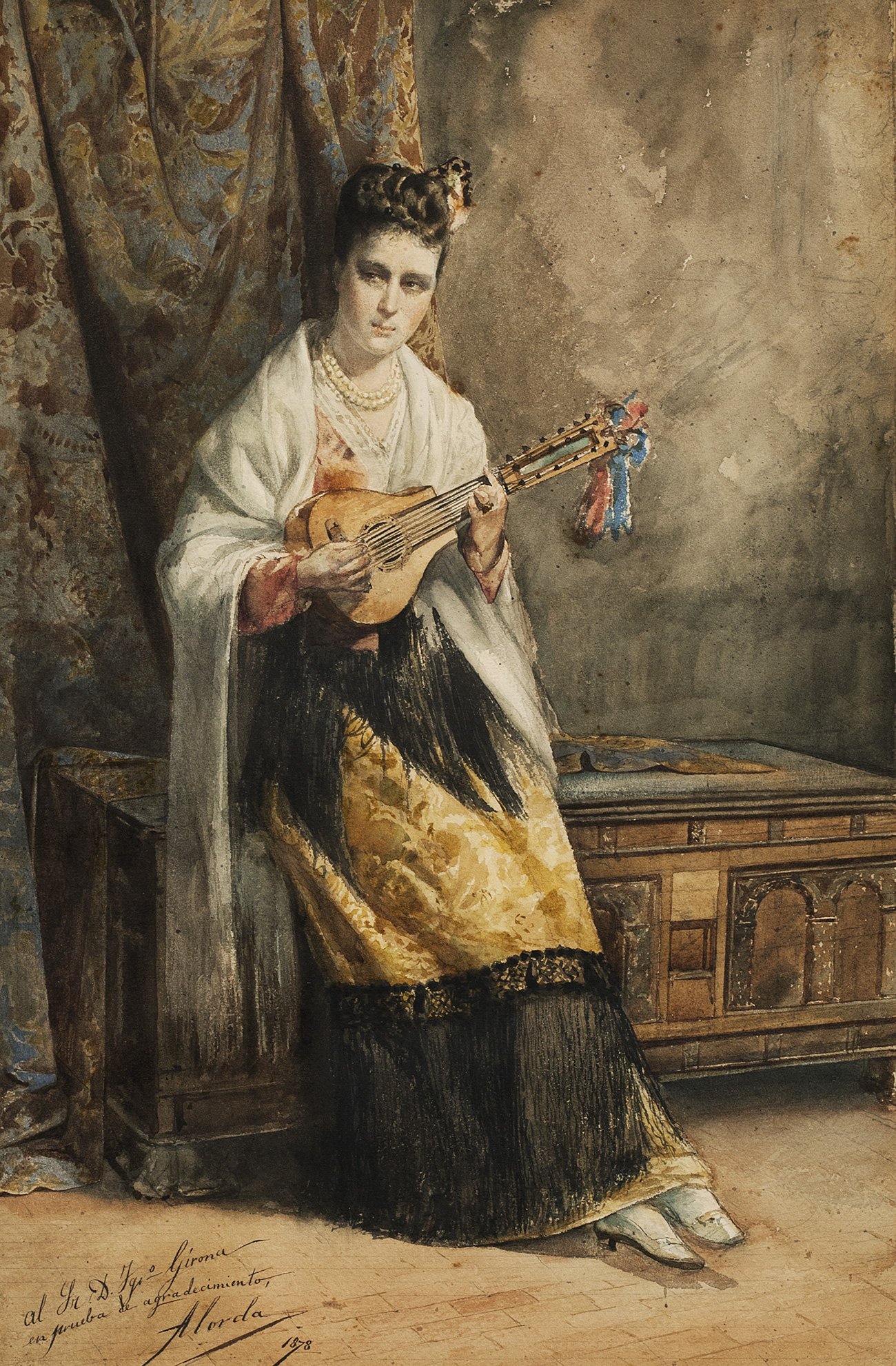
Painting by Ramon Alorda Pérez, 1878, showing a woman playing a bandurria that has square shoulders. The square-shouldered bandurria was a distinct shape of Spanish bandurrias of the 18th century.

Juan Ruiz first mentioned the term "mandurria" in the 14th century in his "Libro De Buen Amor." After that, Juan Bermudo gave the description of the bandurria in his "Comiença el libro llamado declaraciõ de instrumentos" as a three-string instrument in 1555, but he also mentioned other types with four or even five strings. In the early 1870s, a child's wake was accompanied with the bandurria music in Jijona, Alicante Province. The zapateo, a dance derived from the Spanish zapateado and introduced by tobacco cultivators from the Canary Islands, is accompanied with bandurria and other instruments before 1900.

=== Philippines ===
The Philippine harp bandurria is a 14-string bandurria used in many Philippine folkloric songs, with 16 frets and a shorter neck than the 12-string bandurria. This instrument most likely evolved in the Philippines during the Spanish period, from 1521 to 1898. The Filipino bandurria (also banduriya) is used in an orchestra of plucked string instruments called rondalla. It is tuned a step lower than the Spanish version, that is, low to high: F# B E A D G. Filipino bandurrias have been made with coconuts, and as banjoleles with banjo bodies and goatskin soundboards.

=== South America ===
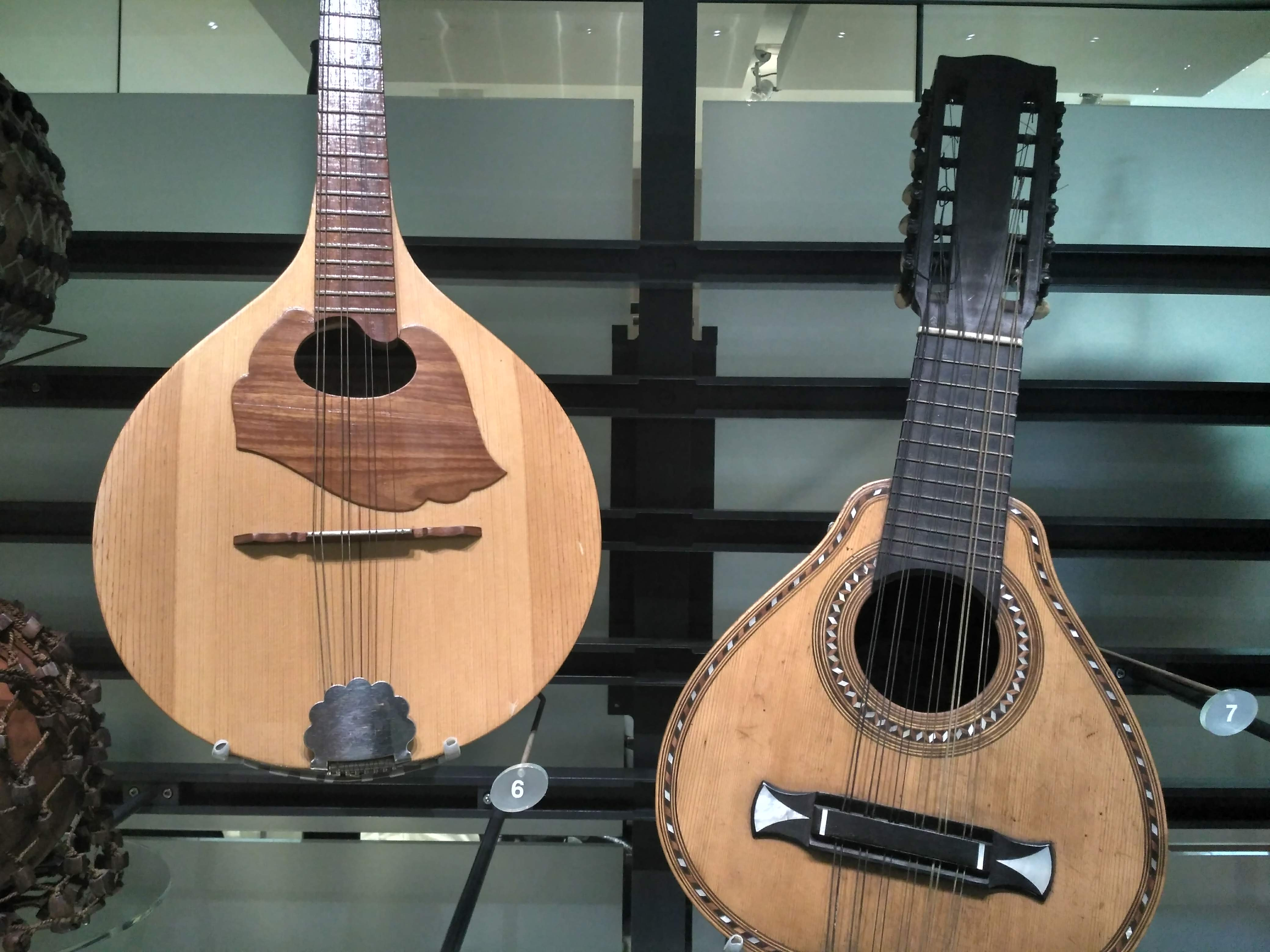
Bandurria (right) with mandolin in the Horniman museum, London, UK.

There are also many different varieties of bandurria in South America, especially Peru and Bolivia. They have four courses, unlike the traditional Spanish six courses. The four courses are double, triple or quadruple, and the tuning is guitar-like, rather than the fourths tuning used on the Spanish type. In Lima, Peru, harp and bandurria duos were common in the early 20th century. Nowadays people there still play bandurria accompanying with the popular vals peruano, or vals criollo.

=== United Kingdom ===
Although generally little known in the UK, the bandurria was used by Roy Williamson of the Scottish folk-group The Corrie Folk Trio. When this group later (after the loss of one member) became The Corries, Williamson incorporated a bandurria into one of the two multi-instrument "combolins" that he constructed for himself and his partner.

== Notable players and music ==
- Javier Mas "Tamiz".
- Rick Walker, a British musician, played this instrument on the song 'A Twilight Zone' by the artist Aim.
- Heber Bartolome
- John Walter Sacley, a graduate from UP - College of Music
- Nikki Zen Obamasca, also from UP - College of Music
- Halina, in their song "Kwarto Waltz" which you can listen to here

== See also ==
- Rondalla
- Laúd
- Octavina
- Music in the Philippines
- Music of Peru
- Music of Spain
- Stringed instrument tunings

== Bibliography ==
- Sparks, Paul (2003). The Classical Mandolin. Oxford: Oxford University Press. ISBN 9780195173376.
