= Tinikling =

Philippine folk dance

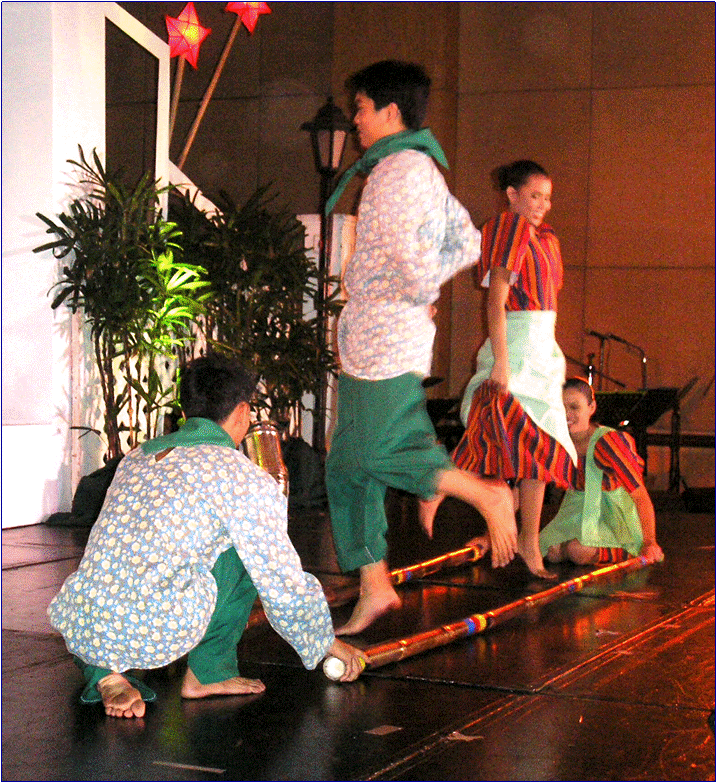
- A performance of Tinikling by the Philippine Cultural Dancers group
- Genre: folk dance
- Instrument: bamboo poles
- Origin: Leyte, Visayas, Philippines

Tinikling (traditionally written tiniclín) is a traditional Philippine folk dance which originated prior to Spanish colonialism in the area. The dance involves at least two people beating, tapping, and sliding who step over and in between the poles in a dance. It is traditionally danced to rondalla music, a sort of serenade played by an ensemble of stringed instruments which originated in Spain during the Middle Ages. The locomotor movements used in this dance are hopping, jumping, and turning.

== Origin ==
The name tinikling is a reference to birds locally known as tikling, which can be any of a number of rail species, but more specifically refers to the slaty-breasted rail (Gallirallus striatus), the buff-banded rail (Gallirallus philippensis), and the barred rail (Gallirallus torquatus). The term tinikling literally means "to perform it tikling-like."

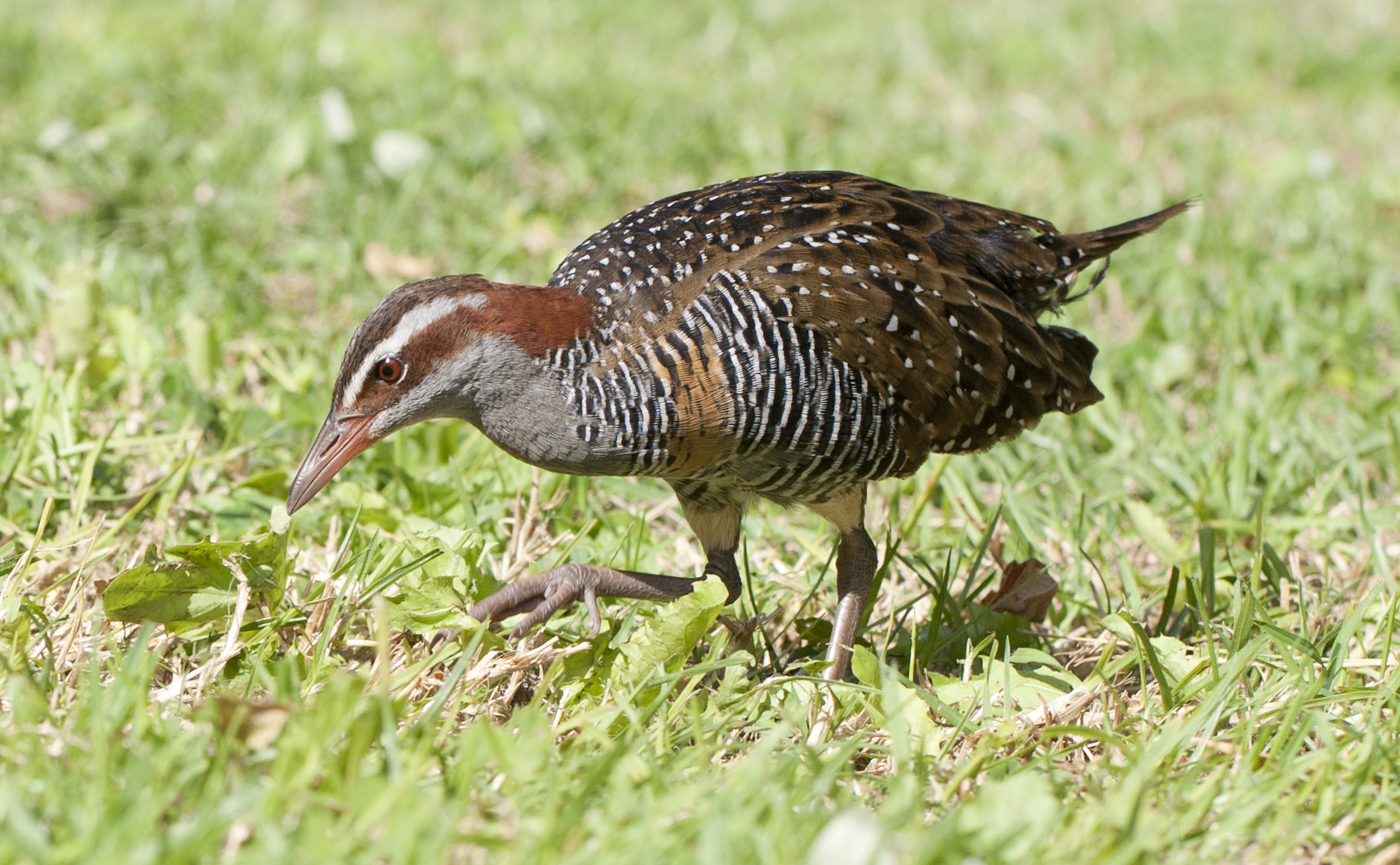
The Buff-banded rail (Gallirallus philippensis), one of the birds locally known in the Philippines as tikling, which were the inspiration for the movements of the dance

The dance originated in Palo, Leyte, Island in the Visayas. It imitates the movement of the tikling birds as they walk between grass stems, run over tree branches, or dodge bamboo traps set by rice farmers. Dancers imitate the tikling bird's legendary grace and speed by skillfully maneuvering between large bamboo poles.

However, other known stories also explain where this national dance originated from. A more popular one is the legend, without historical evidence, that says the tinikling dance originated from Filipino field workers during the time of Spanish colonization. It was a form of punishment for workers who worked too slowly in the large haciendas the Spanish had. More specifically, two spine-tipped bamboo poles were used to hit the feet of the field workers. Legend claims that after a while, the workers trained themselves to dodge the strikes of the bamboo poles. What was once a way to avoid punishment now became a form of art and dance.

As stated, there is no historical basis to support the previous claim. Similar dances exist in other regions of South and Southeast Asia that were never under Spanish rule, such as the Cheraw dance in India, Múa Sạp in Vietnam, Lao Kra Top Mai in Thailand, Robam Kom Araek in Cambodia, Karen or Bamboo Chin dance in Myanmar, Alai Sekap in Brunei, Ami Bamboo in Taiwan, and Magunatip in Sabah (East Malaysia) and North Kalimantan (Indonesia). It could be said, then, that tinikling is probably a dance of pre-Hispanic origin to which distinctive elements, such as the rondalla, were added as a result of the acculturation process that took place during Spanish rule.

Today tinikling is taught throughout the United States. In grades K-12 the dance is used as an aerobic exercise for physical education classes, to help expand physical movements such as hand coordination, foot speed, and also rhythm. Tinikling is commonly performed at schools and on special occasions, such as the Filipino Independence Day, as a celebration of Filipino culture and Filipino pride.

== Description ==
Two or four parallel pairs of bamboo poles, each around 6 to 12 ft (1.8 to 3.7 m) long, are held by two or more sitting or kneeling people ("clappers" or "clickers"). The poles are used as percussive instruments accompanying rondalla music played with string instruments (usually bandurrias, guitars, laúdes, octavinas, or ukuleles). They produce clapping sounds as they are struck against the ground (or two raised pieces of wood) and each other in a triple metre pattern. Traditionally, the poles are tapped twice on the ground on the first two beats, then brought together on the third beat.

Two or more dancers then weave through the rapidly moving bamboo poles with bare feet and ankles. The dancers have to carefully follow the rhythm so as not to get their ankles caught between the poles as they snap closed. They start the dance with their hands at their hips or clasped behind their backs. The tempo of the bamboo poles becomes faster as the dance progresses, forcing the dancers closer together as their movements become more frantic. The dancers hold hands at the last part of the dance when the tempo is the fastest. They end the dance by letting go of each other's hands and stepping out entirely of the moving bamboo poles.

For the dance, women traditionally wear a dress called Balintawak or patadyong, and men wear an untucked embroidered shirt called the barong Tagalog. The Balintawak are colorful dresses with wide arched sleeves and the patadyong is a pineapple fiber blouse paired with checkered skirts. The barong Tagalog is usually a light long-sleeved shirt worn with red trousers. Dancers wear no footwear while performing.

Modern variants of the dance can include innovations like increasing the number or arrangement of the poles (including switching poles mid-dance), changing the number of dancers, or using different music and choreography. Tinikling has also been noted to have the music changed in modern times to modern songs with strong percussions and bass to connect the traditions of the Philippine folk dance with their modern-day lifestyle. In the Philippines, the dance is often performed on certain Sundays.

== Adaptations ==
When performed by dance troupes or in cultural shows, Tinikling is typically performed in the "Rural Suite," which includes dances originating from Filipino Christians that have a more "folksy" character. These dances originate mostly from the islands of Visayas and imitate the simplicity and joy of the lifestyle of the Filipino villagers living in those regions during the Spanish period. Other Filipino folk dances of this category include Sayaw sa Bangko, Maglalatik, and Pandanggo sa Ilaw.

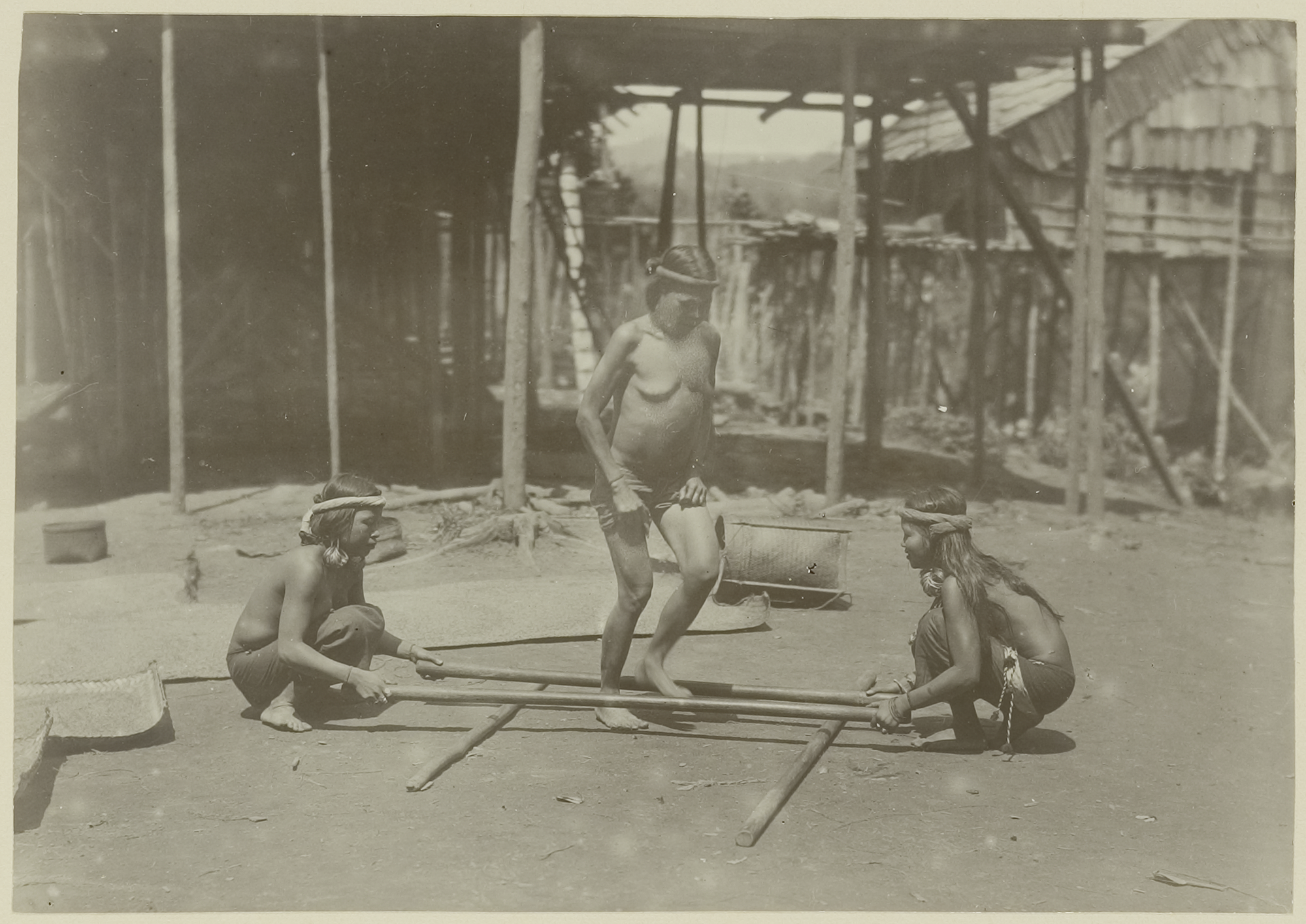
A similar dance to tinikling done by the Kayan in upper mahakam, central Borneo. The photo was taken around 1898 and 1900 A.D.

In the United States, this dance has been altered into a four-beat rhythm to adjust to popular music. In some cases, it has been used in conjunction with traditional Filipino martial arts to demonstrate fleetness of foot and flow of movement. As mentioned earlier, Tinikling is used as aerobic exercise for physical education classes in the United States for grades K-12. Instead of using traditional bamboo poles, most schools create their poles using plastic PVC pipe or wooden dowels. Another alternative is to tie elastic bands to the ankles of two students. The two students switch between jumping with their feet apart and their feet together to simulate the movement of the wooden poles. This way, more students are engaged in the aerobic exercise, rather than just the dancer.

== Regional versions of the dance ==
Similar dances are found throughout Asia signifying close cultural relationships of people within the region. In Taiwan, there are the Ami and Puyuma bamboo dances. In Southeast Asia similar dances such as the Rangku Alu of the Manggarai and the Gaba-gaba of the Ambonese in Indonesia, Múa Sạp from Vietnam, Lao Kra Top Mai from Thailand, Robam Kom Araek from Cambodia, Karen or Chin Bamboo Dance from Myanmar, Alai Sekap in Brunei, and Magunatip of the Murut people of Borneo. In Northeast India, various bamboo dances like the Cheraw dance from Mizoram people and various other Naga groups like the bamboo dances of the Kuki people are still conducted today. Multiple bamboo dances in southern China: the Zhuang, the Li (called Da Chai), Yao, etc.

== See also ==
- Cariñosa, another Philippine dance.
- Maglalatik, a Philippine folk dance performed by male dancers with coconut shell halves secured onto the dancers' hands
- Singkil, a similar Filipino folk dance depicting the Darangen epic
- Culture of the Philippines
- Music of the Philippines
- Cheraw dance, a similar Indian dance
- Magunatip, an energetic Murut dance similarly using bamboo in Sabah, Malaysia and North Kalimantan, Indonesia
- Pangalay, the traditional "fingernail" dance of the Tausūg people of the Sulu Archipelago
