= Subli =

Philippine folk dance

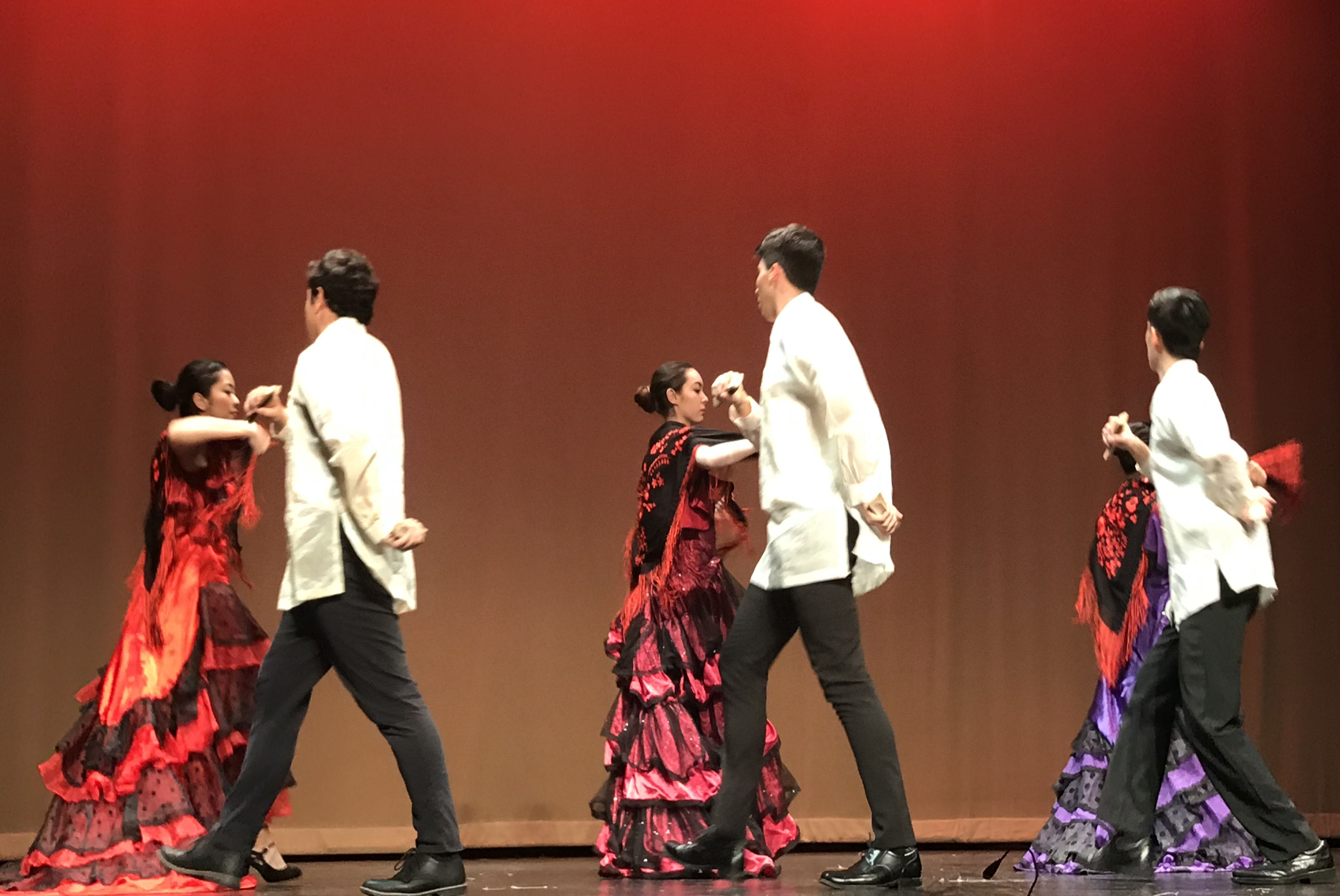

The sublî is a religious folk dance mostly practiced in Batangas in the Philippines, originating in Bauan and Alitagtag, Batangas, and practiced in other parts of that province in the southwestern part of Luzon. It is a Catholic devotional practice (often described as a "prayer") honouring the Holy Cross of Alitagtag (Tagalog: Mahál na Poóng Santa Krus), traditionally done during the Feast of the Mahal na Poon on May 3. It is also done during any other auspicious events like birthdays, graduation ceremonies, and healing rituals on any day of the year except during Lent, generally to fulfill a panata (sacred negotiation).

== Etymology ==
The name sublî is a portmanteau of the Tagalog words subsób ("bent", "stooped", also "fall on the face") and balî (also "bent" or "broken"), referring to the posture adopted by male dancers. Both men and women dancers—called manunublî (meaning "person that does sublî")—perform in pairs and various formations.

== History ==
The birth of the dance is interwined with the discovery of the Cross of Alitagtag. In Bauan was a couple; the abusive, alcoholic husband that loves to gamble came home one night to find no food nor water, and angrily demanded his wife to a distant well to draw water. When she successfully returned rather suspiciously quickly, he ordered her to retrieve water again while subsequently following her in secret, and finally discovers she was drawing from another spring from a dark, cross-shaped tree. Suddenly, a blinding light emanating from the tree flooded the area, and the awestruck husband repented of his sinful ways.

== Devotional ceremony ==
The women's costume includes a straw hat adorned with ribbons, which are waved about, removed, tipped in salute to a copy of the Cross set on an altar, or used to make other graceful gestures.

Traditionally, a chant to the Holy Cross is sometimes intoned at the beginning of the sublî, typically sung by women narrating the retrieval of the cross by the manunubli in Bauan in a dense, archaic, metaphorical language (talinghaga). The song attributes the manunubli to various ritual paraphernelia while describing their aspirations to find the Cross:

Ba tayo sa maykawong
May nabalita doon
Kurus na bagong bangon
Bagong tagang balayong
Sa iyo'y nuhos nalon
Dugo ng Panginoon

O mga kapipino
Halina aba tayo
Sa Alitagtag mambo
Doon daw nagmimilagro
Itong krus na ito
Ang Poong milagroso
Si Hesus Nazarieno

O katampok ng singsing
Sunoy kayo sa akin
Ating paghahanapin
Ang nagmimilagrong garing
Kurus na Ama naming

O mga damoro
Itong aking likmo
Huwag aariing biro
Estacion kung tanto
Nobenas kung may pangako

O mga kabulaklak
Itong ating paglakad
Inaari mong hamak
Estase yung kung dapat
Lubenas kung may palad

O mga kambulong

Oh, companions
Let us go to maykawong
There is news of
A newly raised cross
A newly felled balayong
From this pours and flows
The blood of the Lord

Oh, fellow refined ones
Let us go
To bathe in Alitagtag
Miracles have been wrought there
By this cross
The miraculous Lord
Jesus of Nazareth

Oh, fellow gemstones
Follow me
Let us search
For the miracle working ivory
Our Father Cross

Oh, fellow spices
This our enthronement
Do not treat it as a joke
There must be, as you know
A novena if that has been promised

Oh, fellow flowers
This our journey
Let us accept sincerely
There must be
A novena if that is fated

Another song emphasizes the magnanimity of the transfer of the cross to Alitagtag by metaphorically attributing to various forms of transformations undergone by natural flora.

Ang dahon ay lagolo
Ngayon, kaibang anyo
Krus ang tumubo

Sa una’y ang tikas
Ang dahon ay bayabas
Ngayon ay kaibang hinap
Ang tumubo perlas

Sa una’y ang pisig
Ang damo ay talahib
Ngayo’y kaibang dikit
Krus ang tumirik

Sa una’y ang paite
Ang dahon ay lagundi
Ngayon kaiba ngani
Krus ang nabunyi

Sa una’y ang kasaysayan
Bundok at kaparangan
Ngayo’y naging simbahan
Napagnonobenahan
Taong makasalanan

Sa una’y ang timbo

In the beginning, the timbo
Its leaves were lagolo
Today, it has a different form
A cross has sprouted

In the beginning, the tikas
Its leaves were of the guava
Now it is of a different stain
It has sprouted pearls

In the beginning, the small bamboo
Its grass was talahib
Today it shines differently
The cross has been planted

In the beginning the paite
Its leaves were lagundi
Today it is truly different
The cross is celebrated

In the beginning, the tale
Was of the mountains and the fields
Today it is of the church
Where prayers are said
By sinful men

=== Pinakasubli ===
The accompanying music follows only by the constant beating of drums, punctuated by the clacking of wooden castanets (kalaste) played by the men. The frenetic rhythm of the drums is also seen as proof of the custom's prehispanic origins, in line with the theory that it is a Christianised version of much older, animist rites. The rhythmic mode done in Sinala, Bauan, considered the original, is identical to the tagunggo mode and was perhaps either influenced by or related to it. Theatrical versions (often performed in secular settings, outside of a devotional context) are set to a rondalla ensemble playing a tune by Juan P. Silos.

== See also ==
- Dance in the Philippines
