= Singkil =

Philippine folk dance

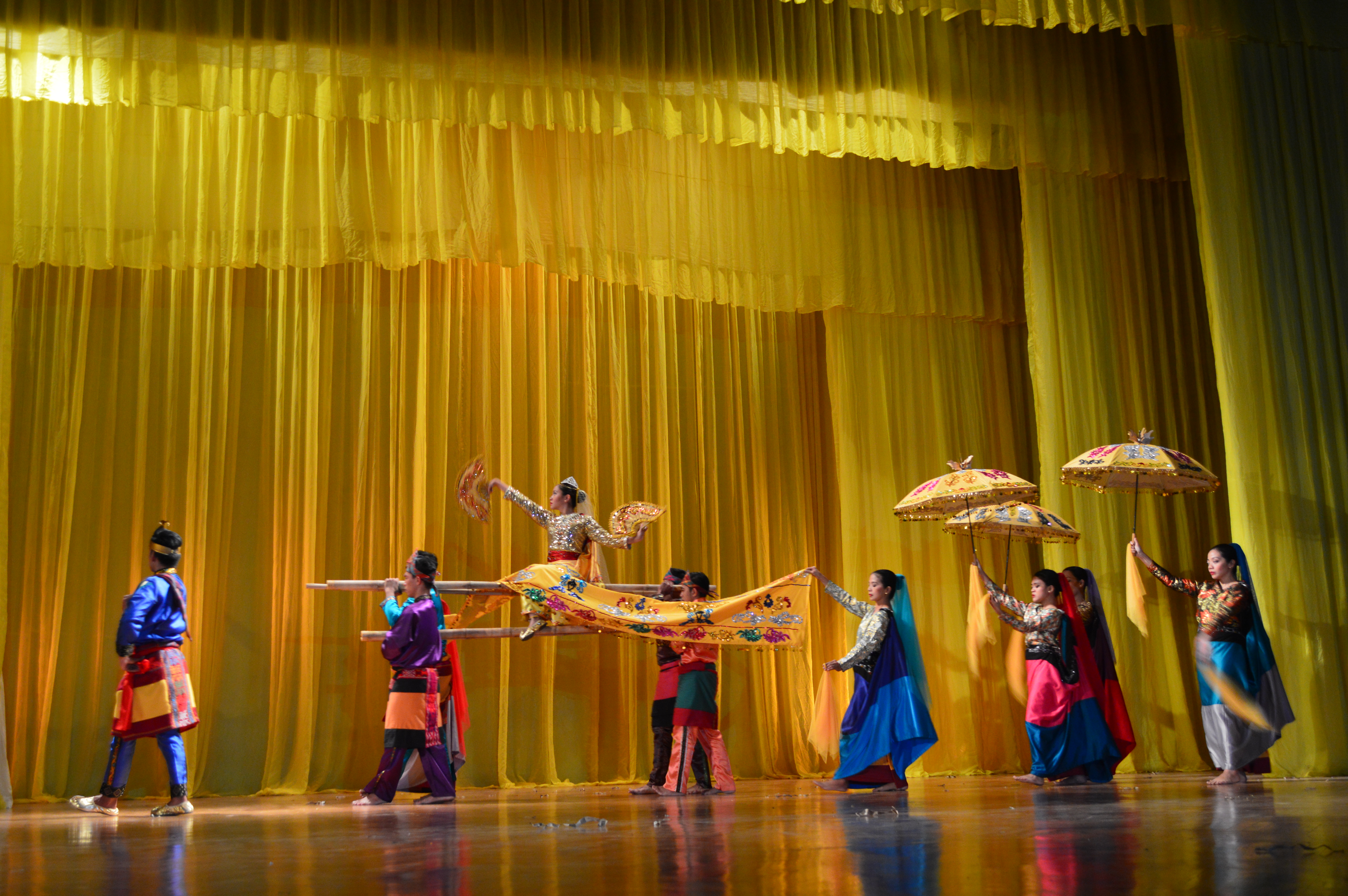
- A performance of Singkil in Egypt
- Genre: folk dance
- Instrument(s): kulintang, agung, bamboo poles
- Origin: Philippines

Singkil is a Maranao royal dance from the Philippines.

The dance features a prince and a princess weaving in and out of crisscrossed bamboo poles clapped in syncopated rhythm. While the man manipulates a sword and shield, the woman gracefully twirls a pair of fans. The dance takes its name from the belled accessory worn on the ankles of the Maranao princess. A kulintang and agung ensemble always accompanies the dance. Singkil has evolved over time, with significant reinterpretations and changes introduced by the Bayanihan folk dance group, such as the incorporation of the elements from the Darangen epic, particularly the episodes involving Prince Bantugan and Princess Gandingan.

== Description ==
Singkil's origins and evolution have been the subject of various debates, but it is mostly agreed upon that it is a relatively new practice by the Maranao people. Sani (1979) suggests that the dance originated in the Basak area, located on the eastern shores of Lake Lanao, which then spread to other villages in the 1930s. On the other hand, de los Santos (1979) claims that the dance was brought to Lanao, specifically to Rumayas, Lumba-Bayabao (formerly known as Maguing), by an individual from Cotabato, Maguindanao. Although de los Santos does not provide a specific date for its introduction, it is believed that the Singkil dance appeared relatively recently. Kanami Namiki also suggests that a plausible origin may have been the bamboo dances practiced by lowland Christians, and their adoption by the Maranao people could have occurred when folk dance was incorporated into the Physical Education curriculum in Lanao's public schools during the early 1900s. Abdullah Madale (1976) includes a photograph in his book, labeling it as the Singkil dance and depicting two parallel bamboo poles. He describes it as a typical outdoor dance of the Maranao people. Similarly, Steven Fernandez, the founder and artistic director of the Integrated Performing Arts Guild (IPAG), speculates that the Singkil dance may have originally been a dance-game played by Maranao children. However, it underwent a significant transformation into a noble royal dance named Singkil by the Bayanihan Philippine National Folk Dance Company.

Henrietta Hofer-Ele was one of the first to conduct a research on the execution of the dance which is now called Singkil. Encouraged by her teacher, Francisca Reyes Aquino, Hofer-Ele conducted her study on a unique bamboo dance that she had witnessed in Marawi during a regional inter-school athletic event. Initially, the dance had no name and was performed only by girls, usually one or two dancers, holding fans in their hands. Aquino had intended to study the dance herself but lacked local connections, which hindered her investigation. However, Hofer-Ele, originally from nearby Cotabato province, had family connections that enabled her to pursue her research.

In the mid-1950s, Hofer-Ele encountered difficulties finding individuals knowledgeable about the dance since it was rarely practiced and gradually fading away. Fortunately, Princess Tarhata Alonto-Lucman, who belonged to royalty, generously shared her knowledge with Hofer-Ele. Other Maranao ladies later taught Hofer-Ele the specific movements involving fans. One of these ladies impressed Hofer-Ele with her singing while skillfully handling three fans in each hand.

While Hofer-Ele's research did not provide evidence that the dance was originally a royal dance, the Bayanihan Philippine National Folk Dance Company, to which she later presented her findings, interpreted it as such. This interpretation may have been influenced by the fact that the person who taught Hofer-Ele the dance was of royal descent. Bayanihan made adjustments to the dance, including designating the principal dancer as a "princess" accompanied by an attendant holding a royal umbrella. The princess wore a gold-colored long-sleeved blouse, a malong, and a veil on her head. She used two fans, adorned with brass nails, and danced between criss-crossed bamboo poles. Originally, there was no musical accompaniment, except for the sounds of clanking brass anklets and clashing bamboo poles. The dance was subsequently named Singkil after the brass anklets worn by the original dancer, Princess Tarhata.

Later, the Bayanihan folk dance group incorporated the Singkil dance into a storyline based on an episode from the Maranao epic, Darangen. The narrative revolves around Prince Bantugan's romantic pursuits of Princess Gandingan. However, as punishment for his past infidelities, supernatural forces hinder his pursuit, causing disturbances and obstacles. In this reinterpretation developed by Bayanihan, male warrior-assistants were introduced alongside the female court ladies accompanying the princess.

Bayanihan played a significant role in popularizing Singkil and introducing notable modifications to the original dance. Creative directors of the group reimagined the dance in the early 1950s to enhance the cast and characters for their world tour at the Brussels Expo in 1958. Their version of Singkil features multiple fan dancers, a prince, warriors with swords and shields, crisscrossed bamboo poles, and an umbrella attendant. The performance incorporates theatrical vignettes portraying a segment of the Darangen epic, where Prince Bantungan rescues Princess Gandingan during an earthquake caused by forest spirits.

The Bayanihan interpretation of Singkil involves the female lead dancer portraying Princess Gandingan of the Darangen epic, wearing ankle rings to keep time while dancing. In the Maranao epic, Princess Gandingan is trapped in the forest during an earthquake caused by the diwatas (or the forest spirits) of the Kingdom of Bumbaran. These forest spirits abduct the princess to teach Prince Bantugan a lesson for his philandering ways. The falling trees during the earthquake are symbolized by the crisscrossed bamboo poles, clacked together to create a unique, syncopated rhythm. Princess Gandingan makes a graceful entrance, manipulating two elaborately designed fans called apir, accompanied by the clapping of the bamboo poles. As the gong crashes, she dances alone between the slow clapping of the bamboo poles, without any musical accompaniment. A female dancer representing the loyal slave of the princess accompanies her throughout the ordeal. Afterward, a male dancer portraying the legendary Prince Bantugan performs a dance round and through the bamboo poles, wielding a shield and a sword. His entrance signifies his determination to rescue the princess from the diwatas. Other dancers skillfully manipulate the apir fans, symbolizing auspicious winds. The dance requires agile footwork to avoid the moving bamboo poles, representing the forces the characters must overcome. The performance concludes with the princess returning home with the prince.

Despite the popularity of the Bayanihan version, criticisms arose regarding their approach. Their research failed to acknowledge that the Maguindanao, a neighboring Muslim ethnolinguistic group, also had a variation of Singkil, which involved both a princess and a prince attempting to court her. The Bayanihan popularized this more elaborate Maguindanao version, erroneously claiming it to be the famous Maranao dance.

Maranao customs prohibit males and females from dancing together. This discrepancy in the Bayanihan's presentation was highlighted by various critics. Peter Gowing, for instance, observed that Manila-based cultural dance troupes, including the Bayanihan, often took liberties with costuming, choreography, and musical accompaniment, making the dances unrecognizable to the Moro people. Usopay Cadar, a Maranao composer, musician, and ethnomusicologist, further criticized the inaccuracies, such as the use of non-Maranao musical accompaniment, incorrect playing of the gongs, violation of the prohibition on male and female dancers appearing together, and male dancers wearing open vests that went against customs. Steven Fernandez also noted that the portrayal of Singkil as a royal dance contradicts the Maranao traditional culture, as in the indigenous Maranao context, entertainment is provided for the royal family, rather than the royal family members themselves dancing during celebrations. Maranao customs also prohibit unmarried women, especially those from the sultan's family, from dancing in public. In response to these criticisms, the Bayanihan Dance Company has since adjusted their approach. They now describe their signature dance as only inspired by the Maranao epic Darangen or as a recreation, acknowledging the divergence from the authentic Maranao dance. Furthermore, the male dancers have been wearing long-sleeved shirts with closed fronts, aligning with cultural norms and customs.

== Adaptations ==
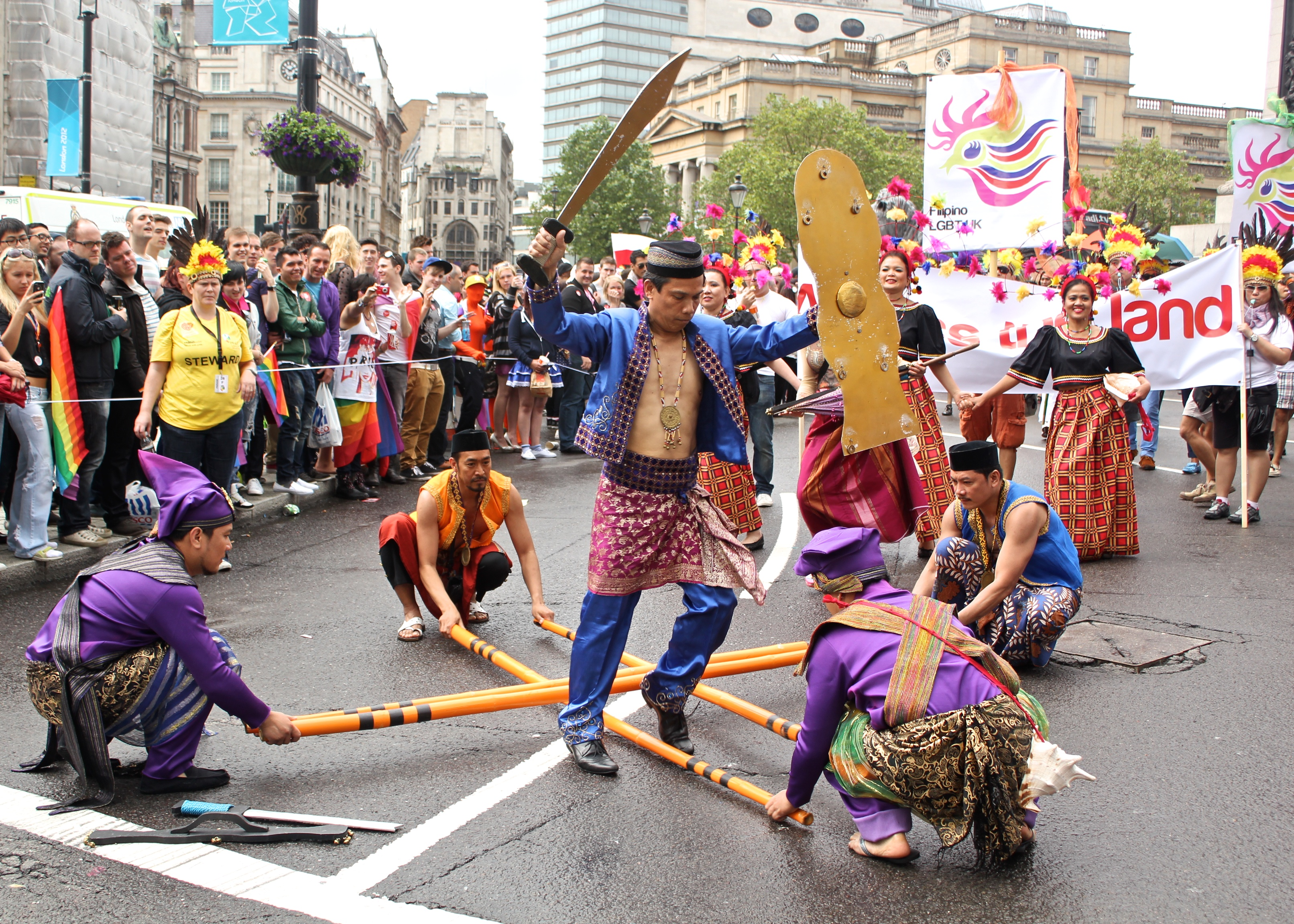
Singkil performed at the World Pride 2012 in London

=== Bayanihan ===
When the Bayanihan Dance Company began performing the Singkíl, the traditional dance was adapted to convey Western aesthetics. The Bayanihan portrayal, branded as the Princess Dance or the Royal Maranao Fan Dance, became so popular that it is often mistaken for the authentic version of the dance.

A notable variation from the original is its inclusion of male dancers, as pole clappers and in the role of the Prince, Rajah Bantugan. Additional sets of criss-crossing bamboo poles were also added.

Further adaptation divided the dance into four movements:

- First movement – "Asik", where the slave with umbrella is introduced.
- Second movement – entrance of Putri Gandingan, the entourage of female fan or scarf dancers, and the arrival of Rajah Bantugan.
- Third movement – Patay, which is a slow section, and is a structural dance convention often found in Western performances.
- Fourth movement – the climax in which all dancers dance to the crescendo of music.

=== Other versions ===
PCN (Pilipino Cultural Night) festivities held by foreign-based student groups and other theatrical dance companies have modernised interpretations of the dance, resulting in unorthodox portrayals of the Singkíl by even the most esteemed of Philippine folk dance choreographers.

The Philippine Barangay Folkdance Troupe portrays the prince dancing scarves rather than with a sword and a shield.

Some dance companies have even fused the Singkíl with ballet, or make use of multiple layers of overlapping bamboos.

== In film ==
The Singkíl was performed in the 2001 American independent film The Debut. The movie was directed by Filipino American filmmaker Gene Cajayon and starred Dante Basco. The film captured the essence of Filipino traditions and the blending of these with modern American culture.

== See also ==
- Tinikling, a similar Spanish-era Filipino folk dance using bamboo poles
- Maharadia Lawana, the Maranao version of the Ramayana epic
- Maranao people
