= Binasuan =

Filipino folk dance

The binasuan or abaruray or pandanggo sa baso is a Filipino folk dance.
