= Maglalatik =

Philippine folk dance

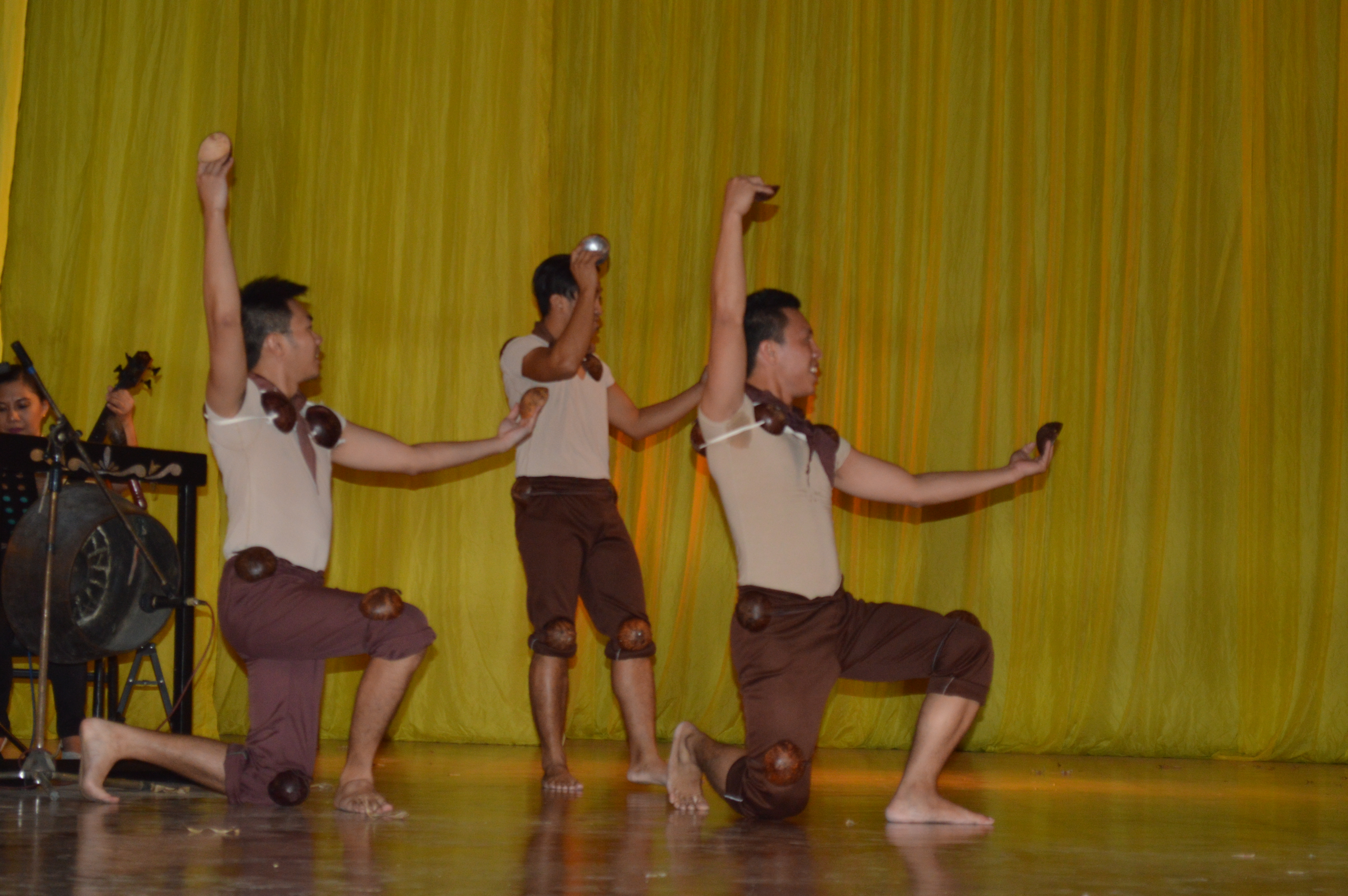
- A performance of Maglalatik
- Genre: folk dance
- Instrument: coconut shells
- Origin: Philippines

The Maglalatik (also known as Manlalatik or Magbabao) is a folk dance from the Philippines performed by shirtless male dancers. Coconut shell halves are secured onto the dancers' exposed torso and hands and on vests upon which are hung four or six more coconut shell halves. The dancers should only wear red. The dancers dance by hitting one coconut shell with the other; sometimes the ones on the hands, the ones on the body, shells above the nipples, or the shells worn by another performer, all in time to a fast drumbeat.

Maglalatik can be seen as a mock battle between the dancing boys. The dance is intended to impress the viewers with the great skill of the dancers. In some "Filipino Martial Arts" (FMA) circles, it is noted that the Maglalatik "consists of a trapping and boxing method hidden in a dance."

The name of the dance means "latik-maker", from latik, a coconut product that is used in Filipino cooking. The dance is also a war dance, depicting a fight between Moros and Christians over the latik.

== See also ==
- Music of the Philippines
- Cariñosa
- Tinikling
