= Remedios de Oteyza =

Filipino dancer and choreographer

Remedios "Totoy" de Oteyza (June 7, 1920 – June 25, 1978) was a Filipino dancer and choreographer.

The daughter of Manuela Alvarez, a concert pianist and singer, and Carlos de Oteyza, she was born in Manila. She left Manila for Spain at the age of three and began taking ballet classes there at the age of eight. On her return to Manila, she continued her studies in ballet with Luva Adameit. After further studies in Spain, she joined the corps de ballet in Paris but was not able to continue because of poor stamina. During World War II, she danced with Paul Szilard at the Manila Metropolitan Theater. De Oteyza was able to study with Alicia Markova and Anton Dolin and later with Mia Slavenska while these dancers were visiting the Philippines. She later returned to Europe and danced with Markova and Dolin in Liverpool. In Europe, she also trained with Lyubov Yegorova, Léo Staats, George Balanchine, Olga Preobrajenska and Sulamith Messerer. In 1947, she established her own dance school Classic Ballet Academy. Her protégés included Maniya Barredo and Maribel Aboitiz. Her students included Inday Gaston-Mañosa, Joji Felix Velarde, Sony Lopez Gonzales, Lydia Madarang Gaston and Pinky Mendoza-Puno.

She established the Manila Ballet Company and later served as artistic director for the Hariraya Ballet Company. She was co-director of the Ballet and Dance Center in Makati. De Oteyza later taught at the Cultural Center of the Philippines (CCP) Dance School and served as an advisor to the Ballet Federation of the Philippines.

De Oteyza choreographed her first work at the age of twelve; it was awarded first prize in a contest held during Manila Carnival. Later in life, she was known for her abstract (storyless) neoclassical ballets set to the music of composers such as Pyotr Ilyich Tchaikovsky, Edvard Grieg, Sergei Rachmaninoff and George Gershwin; she also choreographed a few narrative ballets.

In 1974, she received the Araw ng Maynila award in dance.

She died at the age of 58.
