= Bayanihan Philippine National Folk Dance Company =

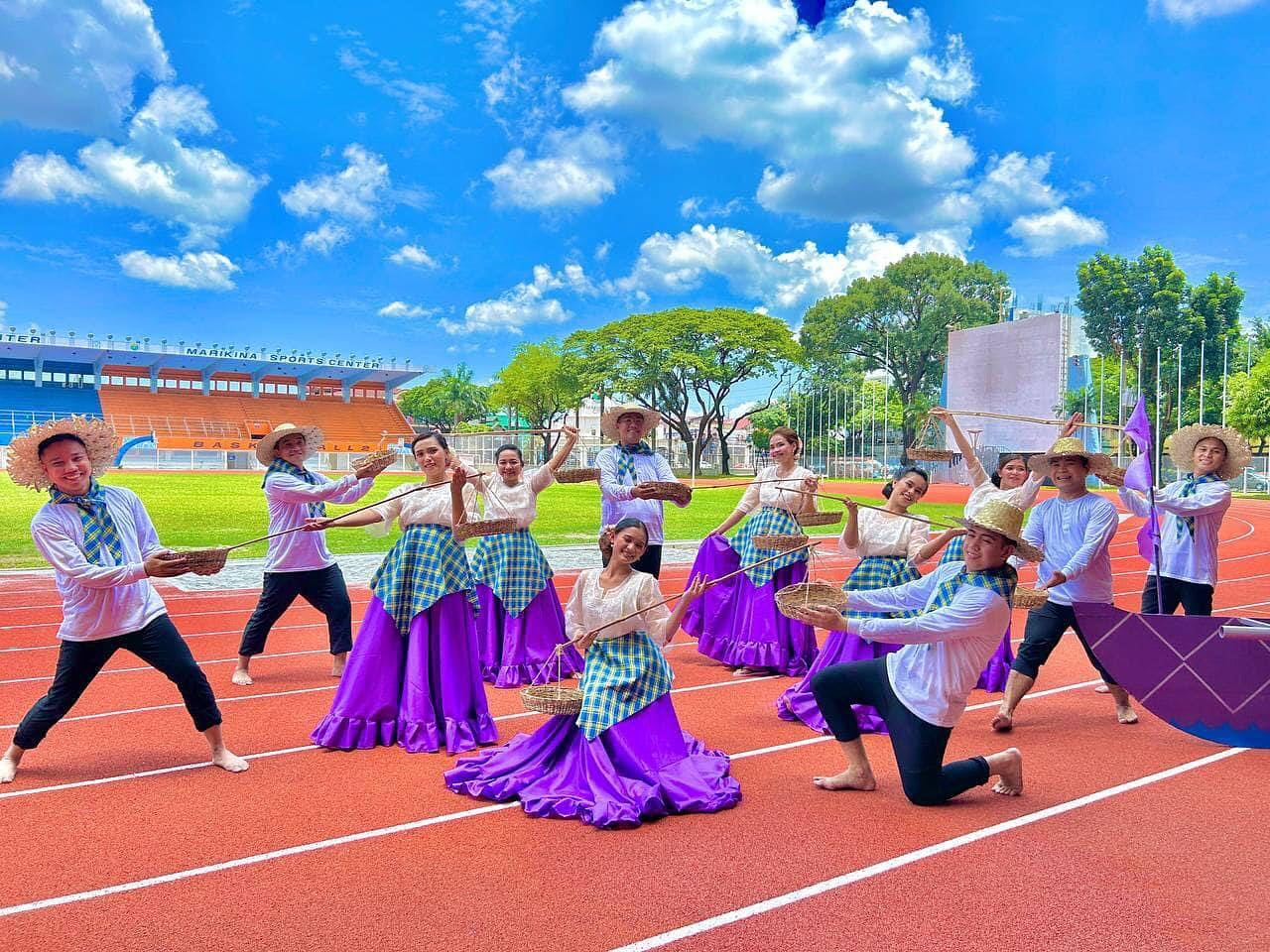
Philippine folk dancers

The Bayanihan Philippine National Folk Dance Company is the oldest dance company in the Philippines. A multi-awarded company, both nationally and internationally, Guillermo Gomez Rivera has called it the "depository of almost all Filipino dances, dress and songs."

The company was founded in 1957 by Helena Z. Benitez and debuted May 27, 1958 at Expo '58, the Brussels World Fair responding to the request of then President Ramon Magsaysay. Since then they have made at least 14 major tours to Africa, Asia, Australia, Europe, US and the Middle East. It has performed in 6 continents, 66 countries and 700 cities worldwide. They perform folk dances from throughout the Philippines and from other countries. The group takes its name from the Filipino word bayanihan which means working together for a common good.

In appreciation and recognition of their pioneering efforts and international success in the realm of Filipino dance, the people of the Philippines through the 10th Congress enacted R. A. 8626 declaring the Bayanihan Philippine Dance Company as The Philippines National Folk Dance Company.

== Beginning ==
In 1956, the Bayanihan Folk Dance Group was established by Dr. Helena Z. Benitez in the Philippine Women's University. It was formally established in 1957 as the Bayanihan Philippine Dance Company. In the same year, the company worked alongside the Bayanihan Folk Arts Center in researching and preserving indigenous Philippine art forms in music, dance, costumes, and folklore, and restructuring and enhancing these art forms to suit the demands of contemporary theatre. Their research led to their international debut at the Brussels Universal Exposition on May 27, 1958 and was adjudged best of 13 national dance groups. The Bayanihan Dance Company was then featured as one of the "Highlights of the Brussels Fair" on The Ed Sullivan Show that beamed to about 40 million television viewers in the United States. The following year, the dance company also appeared on the Dinah Shore Show and reached an audience of 38 million. They were invited by Sol Hurok, the "king of impresarios," for the Sol Hurok International Festival at New York's Winter Garden Theatre. For eight months, the Bayanihan Dance Company toured with 187 performers in the United States, Mexico, France, Belgium, England, Italy, and Israel before an estimated audiences of 232, 300. Their presence in the United States was further enhanced in their coast-to-coast tour of the country under the management of Columbia Artists Management (CAMI) in 1961–1962. They performed at the New York Metropolitan Opera House, and the Seattle World's Fair. Their European tour in the early 1960s was under the production and management of Claude Giraud. During that time, the dance company was featured at USA Hanover Industrial Fair in Germany and received first prize in Theatre des Nations Award in Paris. Aside from live dance theatre performances and TV appearances, the Bayanihan Dance Company also released filmed documentaries that received famed recognition. Robert Snyder created a color documentary film in New York, which won first prize at the Argentina Film Festival.

== Critiques ==
Over the past 40 years, the Bayanihan Dance company has received a wide range of criticism regarding its authenticity in portraying Filipino culture and has been accused of distorting various cultures for the sake of entertainment. Some of the dance suites, movements, costumes, and music are argued to be incorrectly derived or inspired by references that are nonexistent.

Despite this backlash, the company has still been credited for aiding the representation of Filipino culture abroad on the international stage. Because folk dance is the most expressive form for Filipinos, they have managed to depict a very ideal version of Philippine culture. By following the footsteps of other modern nations, they have helped make sense of Philippine history, as well as boost Philippine nationalism. Alejandro Roces, author and National Artist of the Philippines for literature, argues that the company showed the distinct diversity and multiplicity of cultures in this country. Nicanor Tiongson credits the company for bringing various communities within the Philippines together. “The dances shown by Bayanihan were not only the Christianized dances, but included all our traditions: Muslim, ethnic, lowland, etc,. When all these are presented in one performance, it contributes so much to the unity of the country.”
