= Pandanggo =

Philippine folk dance

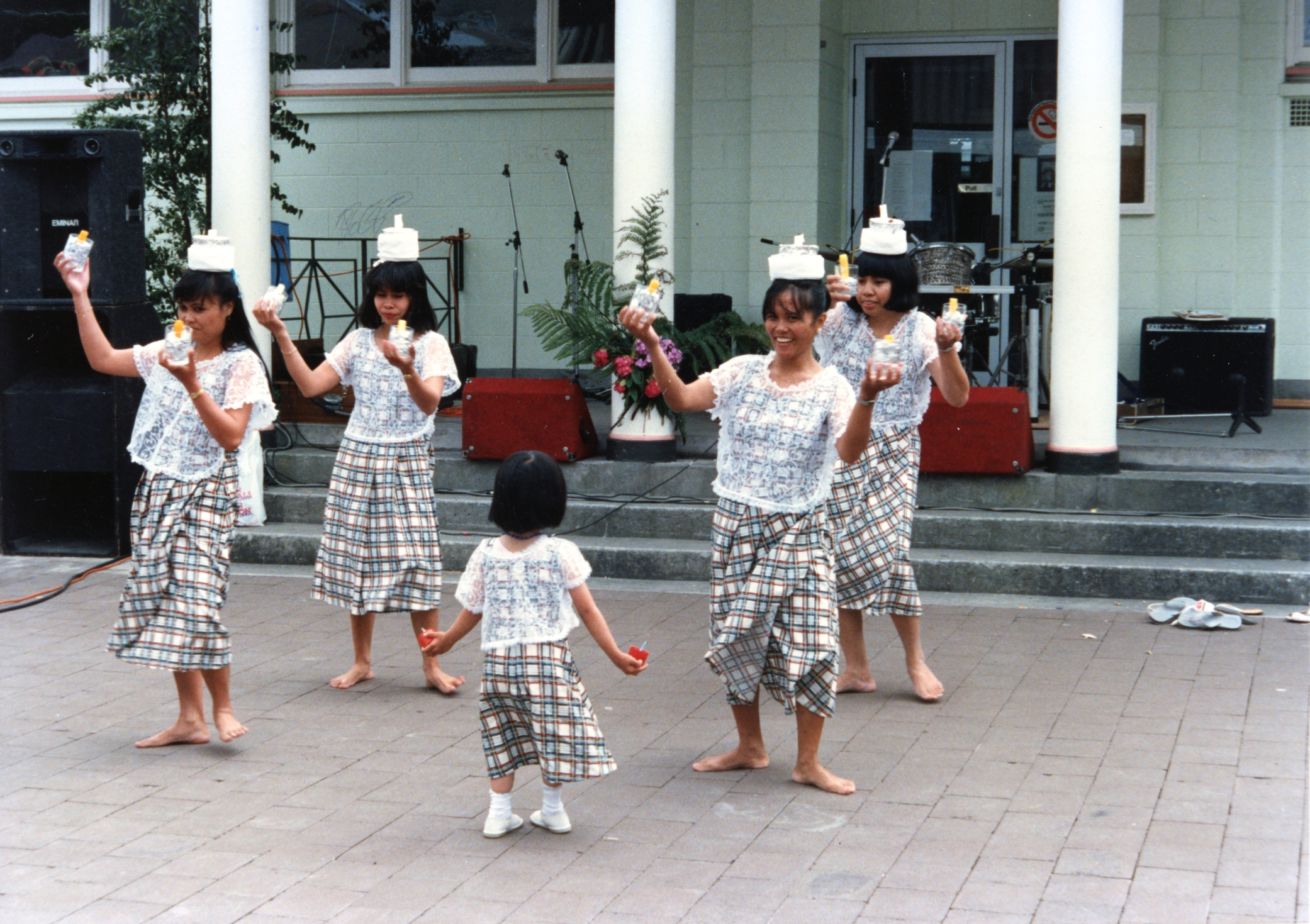
- A performance of Pandanggo sa Ilaw in New Zealand
- Genre: folk dance
- Origin: Philippines

Pandanggo is a Philippine folk dance which has become popular in the rural areas of the Philippines. The dance evolved from Fandango, a Spanish folk dance, which arrived in the Philippines during the Hispanic period. The dance is accompanied by castanets. This dance, together with the Jota, became popular among the illustrados or the upper class and later adapted among the local communities. In the early 18th century, any dance that is considered jovial and lively was called Pandanggo.

== Versions ==
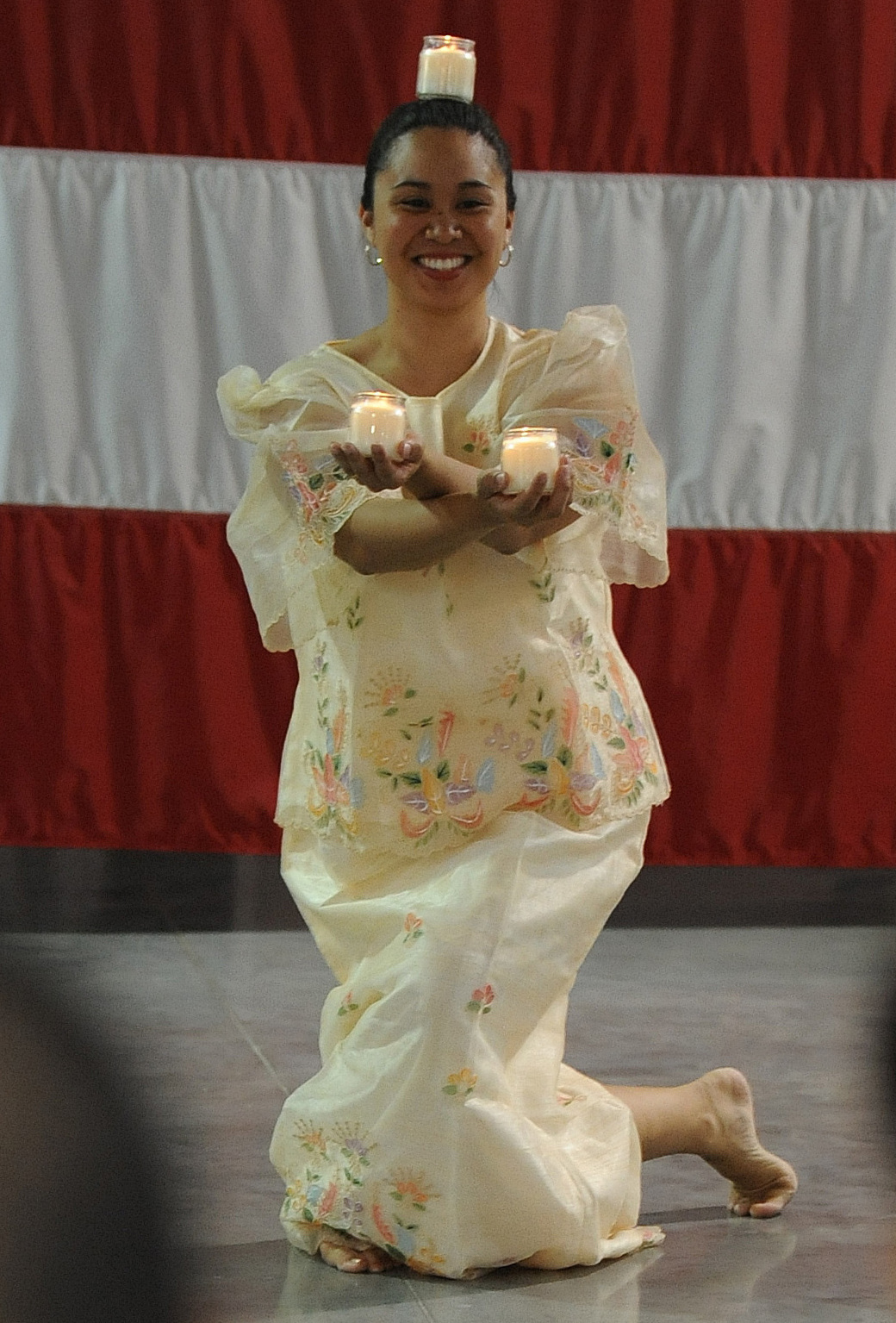
A woman performing the Pandanggo sa Ilaw

A depiction of Pandanggo sa Ilaw ("Dance of Lights") by Nestor Leynes (1966)

There are many versions of this dance, and each locality has its own version. Local dancers have many ways of doing the Pandanggo, but there is one thing in common between different versions: they have gay and sprightly figures. It may be danced at any social gathering and is usually accompanied by clapping. In some places, the musicians do not stop playing until four to five couples have danced, one after the other. When one couple tires, another takes its place until there are no more people to dance. The musicians play faster and faster after each repetition until the dancers are exhausted.

Two of the most popular versions of Pandanggo, as a performing art, are the Pandanggo sa Ilaw (fandango with lights) from Mindoro and Oasioas. Pandanggo sa Ilaw, which originated in Lubang Island, Mindoro, involves the dancers performing while balancing lights. Another Philippine folk dance, Cariñosa, has Pandanggo as its base dance. Pandanggo is still danced by many people but mostly in religious rituals and processions such as the Pandangguhan sa Pasig, during the procession of St. Martha, and the Sayaw sa Obando which has a pandanggo for childless couples. While Fandango in Spain was superseded by its modern version, the Flamenco, it has evolved into a popular folk dance, and as a ritual dance in many religious processions in the Philippines.

== See also ==
- Candle dance
