= Cariñosa =

Philippine dance

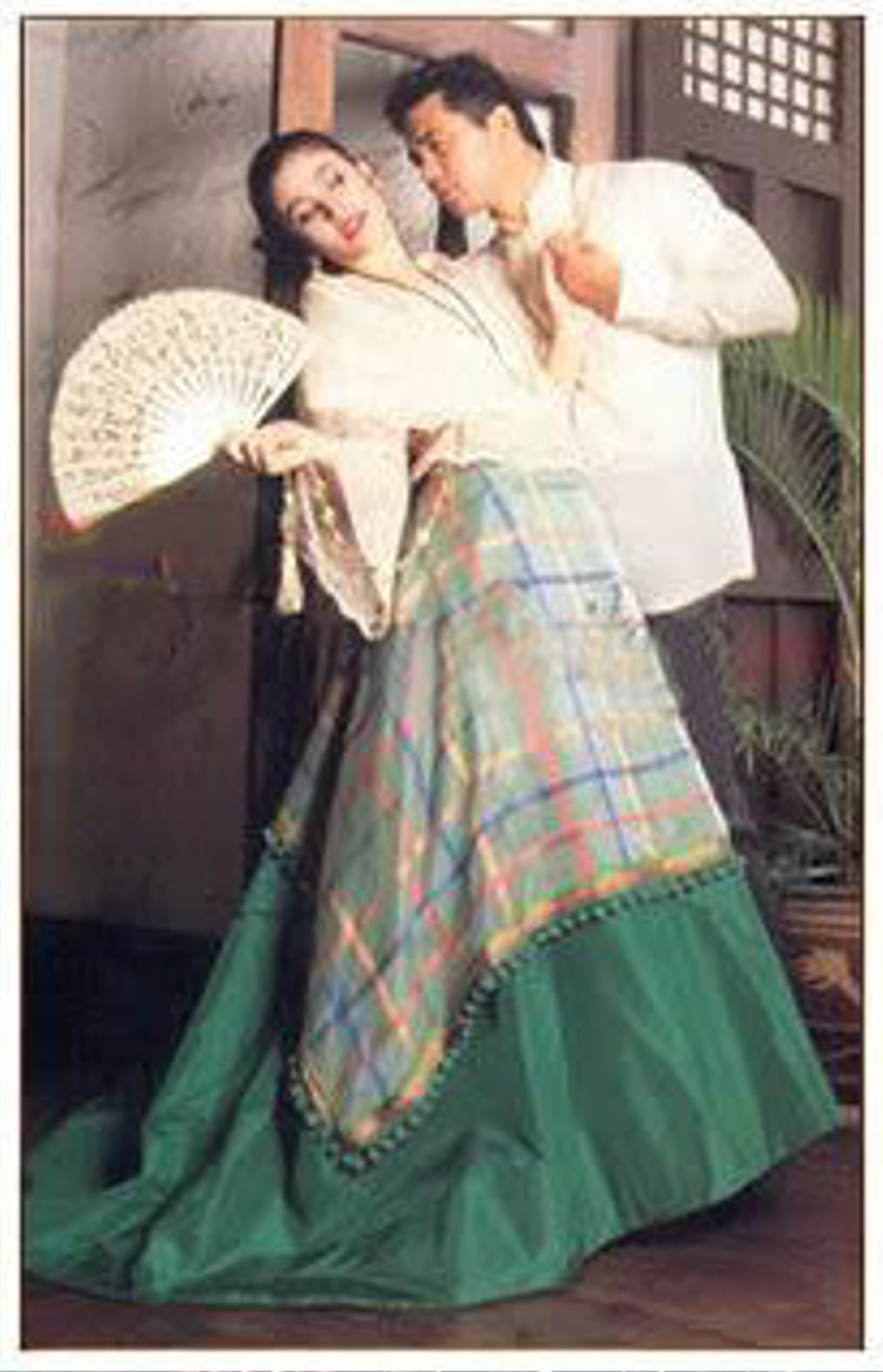
- A performance of Cariñosa.
- Etymology: From the Spanish adjective "cariñoso," meaning loving or affectionate
- Genre: Philippine folk music
- Time signature: 3/4
- Tempo: moderato
- Instrument: Rondalla
- Inventor: Philippines
- Origin: Philippines

The cariñosa (Spanish pronunciation: [kaɾiˈɲosa], meaning loving or affectionate) is a Philippine dance of colonial-era origin from the Maria Clara suite of Philippine folk dances, where the fan or handkerchief plays an instrumental role as it places the couple in a romance scenario.

== History ==
The cariñosa originated in Panay Island and was introduced by the Spaniards during their colonization of the Philippines. It is related to some of the Spanish dances, like the bolero and the Mexican dance, jarabe tapatio, or the Mexican hat dance.

== Bicolano cariñosa ==
According to a book by Francisca Reyes-Aquino, Philippine Folk Dances, Volume 2, a different version of the cariñosa exist in the Bicol Region. Reyes-Aquino is a Filipino folk dancer and cultural researcher who discovered and documented Philippine traditional dances, one of which is the Cariñosa. In the Bicol Region’s cariñosa, the hide and seek movement is done in a different way. In contrast with the original, where the dancer performs it with a fan and a handkerchief, this version uses two handkerchiefs omitting the fan. The dancer holds the handkerchiefs by its corner, pointing their foot forward as they raise their arms with handkerchiefs in hands. It is a complicated step however it is still used in the Bicol Region during festivals and social gatherings.

== Costume ==
Originally, the cariñosa was performed with María Clara gown and barong tagalog due to its Spanish origin. However, the patadyong kimona and camisa de chino may also be worn to reveal nationalism. (a native dress of the Tagalog regions), camisa (a white sleeve) or patadyong kimona (a dress of the Visayan people) and for males, a barong Tagalog and colored pants.

== Status as a Philippine national dance ==
The cariñosa is not considered to be an official national dance of the Philippines, as no law has designated them as such. In 2014, House Representative Rene Relampagos introduced a bill in the House of Representatives to grant the cariñosa such a status, which did not become law.
