= Arman Ferrer =

Filipino singer and theater actor

- Born: Antonio Rey Manuel F. Ferrer; 28 October 1988 (age 37)
- Education: University of the Philippines College of Music
- Occupations: Singer; recording artist; stage actor
- Known for: as Tenyong in Walang Sugat (2010, 2012); as Emilio Aguinaldo in Mabining Mandirigma (2015-2026); as Rama in Rama Hari (2023)
- Musical career
- Genres: Classical; opera; musical theater; Kundiman; Christian; pop music
- Instrument: Vocals
- Years active: 2010–present
- Label: Jesuit Communications Foundation
- Awards: 2016: Outstanding Male Lead Performance in a Musical - 8th Gawad Buhay Awards; 2018: Best Male Crossover Performer - Aliw Awards; 2021: Best Christmas Recording - 34th Awit Awards; 2025: Best Male Crossover Performer - Aliw Awards

Antonio Rey Manuel F. Ferrer (born October 28, 1988), or Arman Ferrer, is a Filipino classical tenor, musical theatre actor, and recording artist.

Regarded as one of the most accomplished figures in contemporary Philippine musical theatre, he is known for his commanding stage presence and versatility across classical, operatic, and Broadway repertoire. Ferrer trained in classical music at the University of the Philippines College of Music and later undertook advanced vocal studies in New York.

He has performed lead roles with major Philippine theatre companies, including Tanghalang Pilipino (TP), Atlantis Theatricals, 9 Works Theatrical, Repertory Philippines, and the Cultural Center of the Philippines (CCP).

His career is distinguished by awards from the Aliw, Awit, and Gawad Buhay Philippine entertainment award-giving bodies, and by high-profile appearances at national and international events including the 2019 State of the Nation Address.

== Early life and education ==
Arman Ferrer was born on October 28, 1988, and the eldest in a brood of six. His father is a lawyer and his mother is a physics teacher. Although both sides of his family shared a love for music, he is the first in his family to pursue it as a profession.

Ferrer was volunteered by his mother to be a contestant at his kindergarten's singing contest where he sang "If We Hold On Together," his first musical piece.

At the age of nine, his mother encouraged him to join the Claret Boys' Choir, an experience he has cited as the moment he recognized his lifelong devotion to music. His earliest and most formative musical influence was Philippine Madrigal Singers choirmaster Mark Anthony Carpio, who also served as his choirmaster at the boy's choir.

Ferrer attended Claret School of Quezon City, where a chance encounter introduced him to musical theater. While playing basketball in the school quadrangle, he was summoned to an audition for a school production of Andrew Lloyd Webber's Joseph and the Amazing Technicolor Dreamcoat and was cast on the spot as Joseph — his first experience of combining singing, dancing, and acting.

He subsequently enrolled in the music program at the University of the Philippines College of Music in Diliman, Quezon City, where he undertook formal classical voice training. Among his early instructors was tenor Raymond Leslie Diaz, before the latter relocated abroad.

Ferrer continued his studies under soprano Camille Lopez Molina, with whom he studied for approximately three years. He later pursued additional instruction under tenor Ramon Acoymo, tenor Arthur Espiritu, and American pedagogue Bill Schuman in New York, as well as soprano Claire Primrose, also in New York.

From 2015 onward, Ferrer studied under South Korean baritone opera singer Park Byeongin, who he credited with helping him place his voice correctly for greater ease and freedom in singing long phrases and high notes.

== Theater career ==
=== Debut and early stage work (2010–2015) ===
Ferrer's entry into professional musical theatre was largely unplanned. In 2010, while still a music student at the UP, he auditioned for the zarzuela Walang Sugat at the Irwin Lee Theater of the Ateneo de Manila University. Walang Sugat is written by Severino Reyes and Fulgencio Tolentino, in Tanghalang Ateneo's first staging of a major zarzuela as part of the university's sesquicentennial celebration. The show ran from 24-28 February 2010. Despite having no prior acting experience, Ferrer was cast as the lead role of the revolutionary hero Tenyong, and was given an intensive acting workshop by director Ricardo Abad and students of Tanghalang Ateneo before rehearsals began. He was 21 years old at the time.

Ferrer reprised the role of Tenyong in 2012, in a restaging of Walang Sugat by TP at the CCP, directed by Carlos Siguion-Reyna, making his theater directorial debut. The show was TP's opener for its 26th season, which run from 16-26 August 2012 at the Tanghalang Aurelio V. Tolentino. The show also featured Cris Villonco and Noel Rayos.

That same year, he took on the role of Crisostomo Ibarra in Noli Me Tangere: The Opera, produced by Dulaang UP on its 37th season. It ran from 21 July to 8 August 2012, and was directed by Alexander Cortez. The staging of the musical was Dulaang UP's contribution to the celebration of national artist Felipe Padilla de Leon's birth centennial, who wrote the Noli musical.

In 2013, he appeared in San Andres B, an original Filipino musical staged by TP at the CCP, portraying patriot Emilio Jacinto. The opera ran from 29 November to 8 December 2013.

He continued to build his profile with a concert appearance in The Best of Opera at Resorts World Manila in 2013, one of his earliest appearances in a large commercial venue. The Best of Opera was a grand, three-hour musical spectacle directed by Anton Juan and featured the ABS-CBN Symphony Orchestra conducted by Gerard Salonga. The production featured a mix of ravishing overtures, arias, duets, quartets, and choruses interpreted by leading Filipino opera stars—such as soprano Rachelle Gerodias, who performed "Awit ni Sisa" from the Filipino opera Noli Me Tangere.

=== Breakthrough roles (2016–2020) ===
From 2016, Ferrer began taking on a succession of prominent roles that cemented his reputation as a leading man in Philippine musical theatre. He originated the role of Emilio Aguinaldo in TP's award-winning 2015 premiere of the original Filipino historical piece Mabining Mandirigma: A Steampunk Musical, and subsequently reprising the character in all five re-staging, including the most recent special Independence Day show at Manila Metropolitan Theater on 12 June 2026.

Ferrer played the role of Fred, Scrooge’s cheerful nephew, in the 2016 production of A Christmas Carol. Co-presented by Globe Live and 9 Works Theatrical, this outdoor Broadway adaptation ran on various dates from 3 - 25 December 2016, at the Globe Iconic Store in Bonifacio High Street Amphitheater. Based on Charles Dickens's 1843 novella A Christmas Carol, the musical features music by Alan Menken and lyrics by Lynn Ahrens and was directed by Robbie Guevara. Following the success of its 2016 run, the production returned in 2017 with a revised staging and a mix of returning and new cast members.

In 2017, Ferrer performed what he has described as one of his most memorable and demanding roles: Julio Madiaga in the musical adaptation of Lino Brocka's landmark film Maynila: sa mga Kuko ng Liwanag, which itself was adapted from the novel Sa mga Kuko ng Liwanag (In The Claws of Brightness) by Edgardo M. Reyes. Produced by Gantimpala Theater Foundation and directed by Joel Lamangan, the role required him to sing, dance, act, and perform stunts simultaneously, with no alternate. The musical was presented at the KIA Theatre in Quezon City from 30 September to 6 October 2017. The production featured music by Von de Guzman and retold the story of a young provincial man searching for his missing fiancée amid the social realities of urban Manila.

During the 2017 ASEAN State Dinner Gala at the Sofitel Philippine Plaza on April 29, Ferrer performed as a featured soloist in the cultural showcase "Postcards and Songs." Directed by Monino S. Duque with arrangements by Robert Delgado, the high-profile diplomatic performance saw Ferrer collaborate with a powerhouse ensemble of prominent Filipino vocalists to mark ASEAN's 50th anniversary.

Ferrer appeared as Carlo Nucci, a rising opera star and rival tenor, in Repertory Philippines' staging of Ken Ludwig's A Comedy of Tenors, which opened the company's 2018 season. The operatic farce, set in a hotel suite in 1930s Paris on the eve of a grand concert, was directed by Miguel Faustmann and ran from January 26 to February 18, 2018, at the Onstage Theater in Greenbelt 1, Makati City, with the full cast also including Lorenz Martinez, Shiela Valderrama-Martinez, Noel Rayos, Jeremy Domingo, and Issa Litton. Ferrer noted in interviews that the production marked his first appearance in a straight English-language play, as his prior stage work had been primarily in Filipino-language musicals.

Ferrer headlined the role of Ah-Tiong, a Chinese scholar who falls in love with a Filipina lounge singer, in Binondo: A Tsinoy Musical, an original Filipino musical produced by Synergy 88 and presented at The Theatre at Solaire in Pasay City. Written by Ricky Lee, directed by Joel Lamangan, and with music by Von de Guzman, the production explored love, racial identity, and political tension set against the backdrop of Chinatown during the periods of Mao Zedong's Cultural Revolution and Ferdinand Marcos' Martial Law, with Shiela Valderrama-Martinez starring opposite Ferrer as Lily. Ferrer's performance earned him a nomination for Best Actor in a Musical at the 2018 Aliw Awards.

Ferrer played Jake, one of the most loyal friends of the conjoined Hilton twins, in Atlantis Theatrical Entertainment Group's Manila premiere of the Broadway musical Side Show, with book and lyrics by Bill Russell, music by Henry Krieger, and additional book material by Bill Condon. Directed by Steven Conde in his first Atlantis directorial outing, the production starred Gab Pangilinan and Kayla Rivera as twins Daisy and Violet Hilton, ran from 31 August 2018, at the Carlos P. Romulo Auditorium, RCBC Plaza, Makati, and also featured Markki Stroem and David Ezra in leading roles. A review in the Philippine Daily Inquirer noted that Ferrer and Ezra were already "showing fantastic vocal power" in their respective roles.

Ferrer was cast in the original Filipino musical Guadalupe: The Musical, produced by Julie Borromeo's Performing Arts Foundation and portraying the apparition of Our Lady of Guadalupe, where he played the Aztec warrior Luis. The production, directed by Baby Barredo with book and lyrics by Joel Trinidad and music by Ejay Yatco, ran through October 14, 2018, at the Meralco Theater in Pasig City. The production was described by critics as the first original musical to dramatize the story of the 1531 apparition in Tepeyac, drawing on the Philippines' historic devotion to Our Lady of Guadalupe, which Pope Pius XI declared the nation's Heavenly Patroness in 1935.

In 2019, Ferrer was part of the ensemble cast of Atlantis Theatrical Entertainment Group's Manila production of the Tony, Grammy, and Olivier Award-winning Beautiful: The Carole King Musical, portraying one of the members of The Drifters alongside Tim Pavino, Jep Go, and Markus Mann. Directed by Bobby Garcia as part of Atlantis' 20th anniversary season, the production starred Kayla Rivera in the titular role and ran from June 14 to July 7, 2019, at the Meralco Theater in Pasig City, with musical direction by Farley Asuncion. A review described the four-man Drifters group as "brimming with so much charm," singling out the ensemble's stage presence in an otherwise Rivera-led production.

Ferrer played Beadle Bamford in Atlantis Theatrical's staging of Stephen Sondheim and Hugh Wheeler's Sweeney Todd: The Demon Barber of Fleet Street, the final production of the company's 20th anniversary season, and marking the musical's 40th anniversary since its original 1979 Broadway premiere, which headlined Lea Salonga as Mrs. Lovett and Jett Pangan in the title role. Directed by Bobby Garcia with set design by Tony Award-winner David Gallo and musical direction by Gerard Salonga accompanied by the ABS-CBN Philharmonic Orchestra, the production ran from October 11 to 27, 2019, at The Theatre at Solaire in Manila, before transferring to the Sands Theatre, Marina Bay Sands in Singapore from November 28 to December 8, 2019.

=== Further work (2021-present) ===
In 2021, amid the COVID-19 pandemic and ongoing restrictions on live theater performances, Ferrer was cast in the title role of Lapu Lapu, Datu ng Mactan, an original Filipino musical commissioned by the NCCA and the National Historical Commission of the Philippines (NHCP) as part of the Quincentennial Commemorations marking the 500th anniversary of the Battle of Mactan. The production--with libretto by award-winning poet and lawyer Nicolas B. Pichay, music by Krina Cayabyab, direction by Dexter Santos, and choreography by Stephen Viñas and Kenneth Torres--was performed and filmed on 30 August 2021 at the newly-conserved Metropolitan Theater in Manila, which had been closed to the public since 1996, making it the venue's first theatrical production in 25 years. The production was streamed for free on October 24, 2021, on the Facebook pages of the Metropolitan Theater and NCCA, following multiple postponements due to the COVID-19 pandemic; Ferrer noted that the entire production, from staging to filming, was completed in under ten days.

In 2023, Ferrer portrayed the title role of Rama in the CCP's restaging of Rama, Hari, a Filipino rock opera ballet that represents the only known Philippine theatrical work to have been created through the collaboration of five National Artists: Alice Reyes (direction and choreography), Ryan Cayabyab (music), Bienvenido Lumbera (libretto), Salvador Bernal (production design), and Rolando Tinio (English lyric translations). The production featured alternating casts, with Ferrer sharing the role of Rama with Gian Magdangal and Vien King, and Shiela Valderrama-Martinez, Karylle Tatlonghari, and Nica Tupas alternating as Sita; performances ran at the Metropolitan Theater on September 15–16, 2023, followed by shows at the Samsung Performing Arts Theater on September 22–23. Following the success of the 2023 run, the production returned by popular demand in February 2024 at the Samsung Performing Arts Theater, with Ferrer and Valderrama-Martinez reprising their roles of Rama and Sita.

In 2024, Ferrer performed as one of the Filipino soloists in the Manila staging of Do You Hear the People Sing?, the internationally acclaimed concert celebrating the music of French musical theatre songwriters Alain Boublil and Claude-Michel Schönberg. The concert, directed by Eddie Grey and conducted by Gerard Salonga with the Filharmonika Orchestra and the Ateneo Chamber Singers, ran on 2-3 August 2024, at the Newport Performing Arts Theater in Pasay City, and featured an international cast led by Abigail Adriano, Nigel Huckle, West End star Bradley Jaden, and Australian soprano Amy Manford, alongside Filipino stage artists Mikkie Bradshaw-Volante, Bituin Escalante, David Ezra, Jep Go, Carla Guevara Laforteza, and Menchu Lauchengco-Yulo. The 2024 Manila staging marked the concert's return to the city a decade after its 2014 charity edition, which raised over US$550,000 for typhoon relief through Habitat for Humanity Philippines.

Ferrer returned to the role of Emilio Aguinaldo--a part he originated in the musical's 2016 staging--in TP's 10th anniversary restaging of Mabining Mandirigma: A Steampunk Musical, alternating the role with David Ezra throughout the run. The production also starred Shaira Opsimar as Apolinario Mabini and ran from 6-29 March 2026, at the Tanghalang Ignacio Gimenez (CCP Black Box Theater), CCP Complex, Pasay City.

In 2026, Ferrer was cast as Anthony Candolino, a tenor vocal student, in the Philippine Opera Company's production of Terrence McNally's Master Class, playing opposite Menchu Lauchengco-Yulo in the role of the legendary soprano Maria Callas. Directed by Jaime del Mundo, the production ran from 15-30 May 2026, at the Carlos P. Romulo Auditorium, RCBC Plaza, Makati City, as part of the Philippine Opera Company's 25th anniversary season; the company had previously mounted the play in 2008 and 2010. Ferrer noted that while he and Lauchengco-Yulo had shared concert stages in the past, Master Class represented their first collaboration in a theatrical play.

=== Other works ===
Aside from his prominent career as a tenor and musical theater actor, Arman Ferrer has worked behind the scenes in off-stage musical and creative roles. He served as a vocal coach for the Kilyawan Boys’ Choir, the 2019 Atlantis Theatrical staging of Madagascar, and the 2026 Repertory Philippines staging of Man of La Mancha.

== Artistic perspective and advocacy ==
Ferrer has consistently identified classical singing as his primary artistic identity, describing it as the discipline from which all other aspects of his performance flow. While acknowledging the demands and rewards of musical theatre, he has stated in interviews that singing constitutes his "oasis of peace" and his truest means of self-expression.

He has been a vocal advocate for greater mainstream access to classical music, opera, and kundiman in the Philippines. In a 2022 interview, he argued that while the country possesses a rich musical heritage, few classical performers manage to sustain a mainstream profile, and that rebranding efforts—without compromising artistic integrity—are necessary to attract younger audiences. He has also called on the Philippine government to extend to the arts the same institutional support it provides to sports.

Reflecting on the craft of operatic acting, Ferrer has drawn on the example of Maria Callas, whose integration of vocal technique and dramatic truthfulness he regards as exemplary. He has applied this philosophy throughout his stage career, particularly in roles requiring him to subordinate vocal display to dramatic purpose.

Alongside his career as a performer, Ferrer has worked as a choral conductor, serving in that capacity with the Pansol Choir, the community choir of the Parish of Sta. Maria della Strada in Barangay Pansol, Quezon City. Founded in 1970, the Pansol Choir is one of the oldest continuously active parish choirs in Quezon City and has a history of participation in both local and international choral competitions; Ferrer's association with the choir dates to at least 2012, when he led them to a second-place finish in a District 3 of Quezon City choral competition representing the Sta. Maria della Strada Parish.

In July 2017, Ferrer conducted the Pansol Choir at the 6th Bali International Choir Festival, held in Bali, Indonesia — the choir's first-ever participation in an international choral competition. The choir returned with five gold medals and a Category Winner trophy, winning in the Musica Sacra category (Gold Level IV and Category Winner), the Gospel & Spiritual category (Gold Level V and Category Winner in the Championship Round), and the Mixed Choir category (Gold Level II), with further gold medals earned in both the Championship Rounds of the Musica Sacra and Gospel & Spiritual categories. The Bali International Choir Festival, organised by the Bandung Choral Society, is an annual competition held in Indonesia that draws choral ensembles from across Asia and the wider world.

Ferrer's formative exposure to choral music traces back to the Claret Boys' Choir, which he joined at the age of nine under the direction of Mark Anthony Carpio — who later became choirmaster of the Philippine Madrigal Singers — and whom Ferrer has credited as the single most important influence on his musicality.

== Live performances ==
=== Stage ===
Stage Works
Year	Production	Role	Venue / Company	Show Dates	Notes	Ref.
2010	Walang Sugat	Tenyong	Irwin Lee Theater, Ateneo de Manila University / Tanghalang Ateneo	24-28 February 2010	Stage debut; zarzuela staged for Ateneo de Manila's sesquicentennial; directed by Ricardo Abad. Ferrer received an acting workshop before being cast as he had no prior acting experience.	
2012	Noli Me Tangere: The Opera	Crisostomo Ibarra	Dulaang UP	21 July - 8 August 2012	Lead role in the operatic adaptation of José Rizal's novel.	
2012	Walang Sugat	Tenyong	TP/CCP	16-26 August 2012	Restaging directed by Carlos Siguion-Reyna; described by Ferrer as "darker" in tone than the 2010 version.	
2013	The Best of Opera	Soloist	Resorts World Manila	5 June 2013	Concert production featuring opera highlights; one of Ferrer's early high-profile appearances after his CCP debut.	
2013	San Andres B	Emilio Jacinto	TP/CCP	29 November - 8 December 2013	Original Filipino musical produced by TP.	
2015	Mabining Mandirigma	Emilio Aguinaldo	TP/CCP	2015/ 2016/ 2019/ 2026	Original Filipino musical about Apolinario Mabini.	
2016	A Christmas Carol	Fred (Scrooge's Nephew)	9 Works Theatrical	3-25 December 2016/ 7-27 December 2017	Musical adaptation of the Charles Dickens classic featuring Alan Menken's score.	
2017	Maynila Sa Mga Kuko ng Liwanag	Julio Madiaga	Gantimpala Theater Foundation	30 September - 6 October 2017	Musical adaptation of the Lino Brocka film classic, directed by Joel Lamangan. Described by Ferrer as one of his most memorable roles.	
2018	A Comedy of Tenors	Carlo Nucci	Onstage, Greenbelt 1, Makati City	26 January- 18 February 2018	Ken Ludwig comedy directed by Miguel Faustmann.	
2018	Binondo: A Tsinoy Musical	Ah-Tiong (male lead)	Synergy 88 Digital	29 June - 8 July 2018	Original Filipino musical set in Manila's Chinatown, directed by Joel Lamangan.	
2018	Side Show	Jake / Cannibal King	Atlantis Theatrical Entertainment Group	31 August - 23 September 2018	Broadway musical about conjoined twins Daisy and Violet Hilton. Ferrer was noted for his "robust baritone" and physicality in the role.	
2018	Guadalupe: The Musical	Luis	Julia Borromeo Productions	28 September -14 October 2018	Original Filipino musical about Our Lady of Guadalupe.	
2019	Beautiful: The Carole King Musical	The Drifters (ensemble member)	Atlantis Theatrical Entertainment Group	14 June - 7 July 2019	Philippine staging of the Broadway jukebox musical.	
2019	Sweeney Todd: The Demon Barber of Fleet Street	Beadle	The Theatre at Solaire, Manila / Atlantis Theatrical Entertainment Group	11-17 October 2019	Starred alongside Lea Salonga and Jett Pangan; production also toured to the Sands Theatre, Marina Bay Sands, Singapore.	
2021	Lapu Lapu, Datu ng Mactan	Lapu Lapu (title role)	Manila Metropolitan Theater/ National Commission for Culture and the Arts (NCCA)	30 August 2021 (streamed 24 October 2021)	Historic production marking the first major musical staged at the newly-renovated Metropolitan Theater; directed by Dexter Santos. Streamed online by NCCA.	
2023	Rama, Hari	Rama (title role)	Metropolitan Theater, Manila; Samsung Performing Arts Theater, Makati / CCP	15, 22-23 September 2023	Filipino rock opera ballet; collaborative work of five National Artists: Alice Reyes (dance direction), Ryan Cayabyab (music), Salvador Bernal (design), Bienvenido Lumbera (literature), and Rolando Tinio (theater and literature).	
2024	Do You Hear the People Sing?	Soloist	Newport Performing Arts Theater, Pasay City	2-3 August 2024	10th anniversary concert celebrating the music of Alain Boublil and Claude-Michel Schönberg (Les Misérables, Miss Saigon); conducted by Gerard Salonga. Part of a charity benefit production.	
2026	Master Class	Anthony Candolino (voice student)	Carlos P. Romulo Auditorium, RCBC Plaza, Makati / Philippine Opera Company	15-30 May 2026	Terrence McNally play about Maria Callas, directed by Jaime del Mundo; starred alongside Menchu Lauchengco-Yulo as Maria Callas.	

=== Concerts ===
Ferrer mounted his first solo concert, All of Me, on 18 November 2022, at the Tanghalang Ignacio Gimenez (CCP Black Box Theater) in Pasay City, as part of the institution's Triple Threats Concert Series. Directed by Floy Quintos, the concert featured special guest performers Shiela Valderrama-Martinez, Carla Guevara Laforteza, Byeongin Park, The Company, and The Ateneo Chamber Singers. The repertoire spanned classical songs, musical theater numbers, pop ballads, OPM, inspirational, and nationalistic pieces, reflecting Ferrer's training and range as a crossover artist.

Following the success of All of Me, Ferrer staged Another Chance at the BGC Performing Arts Theater on 14 February 2023, for the benefit of the Angat Buhay NGO. The concert was again directed by Floy Quintos, with Gino Cruz serving as musical director. Special guests included OPM icon Mitch Valdes, theater artist Shiela Valderrama-Martinez, Toma Cayabyab, Debonair District, and Jackie Lou Blanco. The concert drew a full house at the BGC Arts Center.

Ferrer and Valderrama-Martinez co-headlined their first full concert together, As We Are, on 18 October 2025, at 8:00 PM at the Maybank Performing Arts Theater, Bonifacio Global City, written and directed by Nelsito Gomez, with musical direction by Ejay Yatco. The program opened with Broadway favorites before shifting to a Disney medley and a selection drawn from Filipino musicals the two had shared, including pieces from Rama, Hari, Binondo: A Tsinoy Musical, Maynila sa mga Kuko ng Liwanag, and Noli Me Tangere. Critics noted the concert as a masterclass in elegant vocalism, storytelling, and technical finesse, with the duo's chemistry described as palpable throughout the evening.

A follow-up concert, As Long As You're Mine, was staged on 13 February 2026, at the Maybank Performing Arts Theater in BGC, directed by Nelsito Gomez with Gino Cruz as musical director, and presented as a continuation of As We Are, centered on love songs across multiple genres. Real-life couples Gian Magdangal and Lara Maigue-Magdangal, and Nyoy Volante and Mikkie Bradshaw-Volante appeared as special guests.

Year	Title	Show Dates	Director(s)	Notes	Ref.
2022	All of Me	18 November 2022	Floy Quintos	Part of CCP Triple Threats Concert Series; Venue: Tanghalang Ignacio Gimenez, CCP Black Box Theater, Manila; Solo concert; sold out	
2023	Another Chance	14 February 2023	Floy Quintos	Valentine's Day concert; Venue: Globe Auditorium, Maybank Performing Arts Theater, BGC Arts Center, Taguig; Benefit concert for Angat Buhay NGO	
2025	As We Are	18 October 2025	Nelsito Gomez	Co-headlined with Shiela Valderrama-Martinez; Venue: Maybank Performing Arts Theater, BGC Arts Center, Taguig; Musical direction by Ejay Yatco	
2026	As Long As You're Mine	13 February 2026	Nelsito Gomez	Co-headlined with Shiela Valderrama-Martinez; Venue: Maybank Performing Arts Theater, BGC Arts Center, Taguig; Pre-Valentine's Day concert; musical direction by Gino Cruz	

== Discography ==
Arman Ferrer has expanded his musical footprint beyond the stage by releasing a diverse catalog of recorded music across popular digital streaming platforms. His recordings span theatrical tracks, collaborative studio albums, and standalone singles, including classical pop revivals like "Give Me A Chance" and the cinematic ballad "Giliw." He has also frequently lent his operatic vocals to various spiritual and cultural ensemble recordings, such as tracks with the Jesuit Music Ministry, further highlighting his versatility outside of live theater.

=== Studio albums ===
Studio Albums
Year	Artist	Album	Notes	Ref.
2019	Arman Ferrer	Sometime, Somewhere	7 songs, 29 minutes; Label: Noel Ferrer	
2020	Arman Ferrer	Christmas Begins	11 songs, 46 minutes; Label: Noel Ferrer/Jesuit Communications Foundation	

=== Singles ===
As a solo artist
Year	Song	Notes	Ref.
2020	"Paskong Walang Hanggan"	Jesuit Communications Foundation; 2 October 2020	
2020	"Oyayi"	Jesuit Communications Foundation; 9 October 2020	
2020	"Paglamig ng Hangin"	Jesuit Communications Foundation; 16 October 2020	
2020	"Payapang Daigdig"	Jesuit Communications Foundation; 23 October 2020	
2020	"Bisperas"	Jesuit Communications Foundation; 30 October 2020	
2020	"The Work of Christmas"	Jesuit Communications Foundation; 6 November 2020	
2020	"The Hands That First Held Mary's Child" (feat. Kilyawan Consortium of Voices)	Jesuit Communications Foundation; 13 November 2020	
2020	"Diwa ng Pasko"	Jesuit Communications Foundation; 20 November 2020	
2021	"OK Lang Ba?"	Noel Ferrer; 5 February 2021	
2021	"Panunumpa" feat. Alberto Antonio, Jr.	Jesuit Communications Foundation; 14 February 2021	
2021	"Unsaon Ba Mag-Inusara"	Kadasig; 6 August 2021	
2021	"Tuloy ang Pasko"	Noel Ferrer; 26 December 2021	
2022	"Give Me A Chance"	Noel Ferrer / Odette Quesada; 28 October 2022	
2023	"Walang Ibang Tahanan"	Jesuit Communications Foundation; 31 March 2023	
2024	"Sa Pagbuhos Ng Ulan" (feat. Gino Cruz)	Gino Cruz Music; 7 June 2024	

As a featured artist
Year	Song	Notes	Ref.
2019	"One More Gift"	Joanna Ampil, Arman Ferrer, Joaquin Pedro Valdes; Jesuit Communications Foundation; 20 September 2019; Streaming	
2019	"My Favorite Time of the Year"	Joaquin Pedro Valdes, Myke Salomon, Arman Ferrer, Trina Belamide; 2019; Trina Belamide; 8 November 2019	
2020	"Giliw"	Martin Nievera, Arman Ferrer; Jesuit Communications Foundation; 1 May 2020	
2020	"Far Greater Love"	Arman Ferrer, Toto Sorioso; Jesuit Communications Foundation; 14 August 2020	
2021	"Live Christ, Share Christ"	with Bituin Escalante, Jed Madela, Erik Santos, Angeline Quinto, Jolina Magdangal, Janine Berdin, Liezel Garcia, Arman Ferrer, Matt Lozano; 2021; Pop, Gospel, Religious; FLAC/Streaming	

== Filmography ==
=== Television ===
Year	Title	Role	Genre	Notes	Ref.
2018	Letters and Music	Guest	Talk show		
2023	Magandang Buhay	Guest	Talk show	Ferrer was a guest in Magandang Buhay, together with Poppert Bernadas	
2023	ASAP	Guest	Musical	Ferrer sang "Thinking Out Loud" by Ed Sheeran in one of the segments	

== Awards and accolades ==
Arman Ferrer has earned widespread critical acclaim and multiple industry accolades throughout his career as a leading crossover tenor. His exceptional vocal performances and stage presence have garnered him various recognitions and nominations from prestigious body organizations, including the Aliw Awards, the Philstage Gawad Buhay, and the Awit Awards. Notably, he won the Philstage Gawad Buhay Award for Best Male Featured Performance in a Musical in 2015, establishing him as one of the most prominent talents in Philippine musical theater.

=== Gawad Buhay Awards ===
Gawad Buhay Awards (PhilStage)
Year	Category	Work	Organization	Result	Notes	Ref.
2016 (8th ceremony, April 28, 2016)	Outstanding Male Featured Performance in a Musical	Mabining Mandirigma (as Emilio Aguinaldo)	Philstage / Gawad Buhay	Won	Production won 12 awards in total. Ferrer won for his featured role as Gen. Emilio Aguinaldo opposite Delphine Buencamino's Apolinario Mabini.	
2018 (10th ceremony, April 12, 2018)	Outstanding Male Lead Performance in a Musical	Maynila sa Mga Kuko ng Liwanag, The Musical (as Julio Madiaga)	Philstage / Gawad Buhay	Nominated		

=== Awit Awards ===
Awit Awards (Philippine Association of the Record Industry)
Year	Category	Work	Organization	Result	Notes	Ref.
2021 (34th Awit Awards, 29 November 2021)	Best Christmas Recording	"Paskong Walang Hanggan" (composed by Ryan Cayabyab; produced by Jesuit Communications / Jesuit Music Ministry)	Philippine Association of the Record Industry (PARI)	Won	First-ever solo recording of the Cayabyab composition; part of the Christmas Begins album.	

=== Aliw Awards ===
Aliw Awards (Aliw Awards Foundation, Inc.)
Year	Category	Work	Organization	Result	Notes / References	Ref.
2018 (ceremony held December 15, 2018)	Best Male Crossover Performer	Live performance / concert appearances	Aliw Awards Foundation, Inc. (AAFI)	Won	Ceremony at which Lea Salonga and Erik Santos were named co-Entertainers of the Year.	
2024 (37th ceremony, December 18, 2024)	Best Male Crossover Performer	Live performance / concert appearances	Aliw Awards Foundation, Inc. (AAFI)	Won		
2025 (38th ceremony, December 15, 2025)	Best Male Crossover Performer	Live performance / concert appearances	Aliw Awards Foundation, Inc. (AAFI)	Won		
