= Mabining Mandirigma: A Steampunk Musical =

2015 Philippine steampunk musical

- 2026 theatrical run poster
- Music: Joed Balsamo
- Lyrics: Nicanor Tiongson
- Book: Nicanor Tiongson
- Setting: Philippines
- Basis: The life of Apolinario Mabini
- Premiere: 3–19 July 2015: Tanghalang Pilipino, Tanghalang Aurelio Tolentino (CCP Little Theater)
- Productions: 2015:Original Production (3-19 July 2015); 2016:First Restaging 1st Run (19 February 2016 to 13 March 2016); 2016:First Restaging 2nd Run (2-18 December2016); 2019:Revival (16 August to 1 September 2019); 2026:10th Anniversary Revival (6-29 March 2026; 2026:Special Independence Day Show (12 June 2026)
- Awards: 2016 Outstanding Musical Production at 8th Gawad Buhay

Mabining Mandirigma: A Steampunk Musical (English: The Gentle Warrior: A Steampunk Musical) is a 2015 original Filipino-language historical musical produced by Tanghalang Pilipino (TP), the resident theater company of the Cultural Center of the Philippines (CCP). The musical was written by playwright and scholar Nicanor Tiongson, with music composed by Joed Balsamo, and directed by Chris Millado. The work dramatizes the life and legacy of Apolinario Mabini (1864–1903), the "Sublime Paralytic," legal and constitutional adviser to the Revolutionary Government in 1898 and the first Prime Minister of the Philippines upon the establishment of the First Philippine Republic in 1899.

The show premiered on 3 July 2015 at the Tanghalang Aurelio Tolentino (CCP Little Theater), Cultural Center of the Philippines in Pasay City as part of the sesquicentennial commemoration of Mabini's birth.

The musical won 12 awards out of its 13 nominations at the 8th Gawad Buhay Awards in 2015, including Outstanding Original Musical.

Heavily praised for its experimental design and staging, the production juxtaposes a traditional 19th-century historical narrative with a steampunk aesthetic and a contemporary hip-hop and rock score to highlight the modern relevance of Mabini's political ideals, while critics and scholars noted the production's use of cross-gender casting, in which the central male historical figure of Mabini is played exclusively by female actors.

Including the 2015 original production, Mabining Mandirigma had a total of five distinct runs. It saw three separate restaging—including two runs in 2016 and a highly successful iteration in 2019 before returning for its fifth staging in March 2026 to mark its 10th anniversary and a special 2026 Philippine Independence day show at the Manila Metropolitan Theater.

Mabining Mandirigma is part of TP's tribute to three revolutionary heroes through a trilogy of musicals: Pingkian for Emilio Jacinto, Gregoria Lakambini for Gregoria de Jesus, and Mabining Mandirigma for Mabini.

== Concept and development ==
=== The creative team ===
TP produced Mabining Mandirigma, which was directed by Chris Millado. The musical featured a libretto by Nicanor Tiongson and music composed by Jed Balsamo. (Note: Attributed to multiple sources)

TP was founded in 1987 as "the resident theater company of the Cultural Center of the Philippines (CCP). It aims to promote Philippine theater rooted in centuries-old Filipino culture and history while being responsive to evolving contemporary society."

Nicanor Tiongson is a playwright and scholar, who served as artistic director and vice president of the CCP. He has published pioneering studies in Philippine film and theater and written plays like Pilipinas Circa 1907 and Noli at Fili Dekada 2000.

Jed Balsamo is a composer, musical director, arranger and orchestrator, arts administrator, and pianist for theatre (musical and opera), dance (ballet), concert music (classical and pop), and various arts and music organizations in the Philippines.

Chris Millado is playwright, director, teacher, and theater organizer, who joined CCP in 1986 and also became its vice president and artistic director in 2011.

Tiongson said that collaborating with Jed Balsamo involved “adjusting, editing or adding lyrics, and restructuring scenes to make them more musically dramatic.” He also shared that he provided Balsamo with historical songs and texts from the period to help shape the music. According to Tiongson, he specifically asked Balsamo “to give us songs with recognizable and memorable melodies” and praised the composer's work, saying that “his lullaby is beautiful.” He further described Balsamo's music as “full of allusions to the music of the period” while still effectively connecting “to young contemporary audiences.”

=== Inspiration and intent ===
In a June 2015 media conference, Millado, said that Mabining Mandirigma is part of the country's year-long celebration of Mabini's 150th birth anniversary

In a prepared statement read by TP artistic director Nanding Josef in the same media conference, he said that while Tiongson was researching the life and achievements of Mabini, Tiongson studied El Verdadero Decalogo, Contestaciones y Consideraciones al Pueblo y Congreso Norte-Americanos, Ordenanzas de la Revolucion, Programa Constitucional de la Republica Filipina, and La Revolucion Filipina, along with Mabini's letters and a biography written by Rafael Palma. These materials later became the basis for a script, which underwent several revisions after discussions with Millado.

In February 2016, Tiongson described Mabini:

He (Mabini) is still the hero the country needs because the hurdles the Philippine government faced in 1898 and 1899 are the same as today's: feudal patronage, private armies, the use of violence in subduing dissenters, and use of legislature to consolidate power and wealth.

=== Steampunk concept and Brechtian style ===
To vividly depict its setting, Mabining Mandirigma employs steampunk, which TP describes as “a subgenre of science fiction that incorporates technology and aesthetic designs inspired by 19th-century industrial steam-powered machinery.”

Tiongson described the production's style as Brechtian, emphasizing that its primary aim is the communication of ideas. He noted that what should stand out are the concepts being presented rather than emotional immersion. In relation to this approach, he explained that the staging employs devices associated with Bertolt Brecht's concept of alienation, intended not to sever engagement with the play, but to create enough distance for the audience to observe critically. This distancing allows viewers to concentrate on the ideas being conveyed instead of becoming absorbed primarily in emotional response. These theatrical choices are used to separate the audience from full emotional identification with the stage action, reinforcing Tiongson's statement in the program that “Mabini is the hero par excellence for the Philippines today.”

=== Gender-blind casting ===
The casting decision became one of the production's defining elements. Throughout the years, five women took on the role of Mabini in the musical, highlighting the revolutionary leader's intelligence and moral integrity instead of focusing on physical resemblance.

In June 2015, Millado clarified, “I am not casting Mabini as a woman. I’ve cast a female actor to play Mabini—there’s a difference.” He also emphasized that “going for non-traditional acting (men playing female roles and vice versa) is not new, especially in Asian theater,” where “all noble characters like heroes, priests, intellectuals, are played by female actors.” According to him, the casting approach underscored how Mabini, as a visionary, was treated as an outsider and distinguished from those who merely exploited the emerging republic, and looked down on him because of his disability.

Millado said that the decision to cast a woman as Mabini stemmed from a technical challenge, as the production team wanted the character's voice to stand out from the rest of the cast. The issue was ultimately addressed by assigning a female actor. The team wanted Mabini's voice "to stand out high and clear amidst all the chorus – an auditory metaphor for how powerful the man’s ideologies were."

In addition to casting a woman as Mabini, the production also featured female actors portraying the American generals, while the role of Mark Twain was performed in drag.

== Synopsis ==
Set in 1898, the musical follows Apolinario Mabini during the Philippine Revolution serving as adviser and, later, cabinet president under General Emilio Aguinaldo. Despite his physical paralysis, Mabini becomes one of the revolution's strongest voices for integrity, justice, and genuine independence. As Mabini helps establish a revolutionary government, he faces growing opposition from powerful ilustrado politicians such as Felipe Buencamino and Pedro Paterno, who prioritize wealth and political compromise over the ideals of the revolution. While Aguinaldo initially trusts Mabini, he gradually becomes influenced by the elite faction, creating tension between the two leaders. The story traces Mabini's increasingly lonely struggle to protect the interests of the Filipino people while resisting corruption and opportunism within the government. His political downfall eventually leads to exile in Guam, but even after suffering betrayal and hardship, Mabini returns to the Philippines with his principles unchanged. Three months after his return, he dies of cholera at the age of 38.

=== Act One ===
Act One opens with the image of a duyan (hammock), symbolizing both Pule's (Note: In the Philippines, the nickname "Pule" is a traditional, shortened Tagalog pet name for anyone named Apolinario. It is formed by taking the stressed syllables of the name (Apo-linar-io) and softening them into a friendly, two-syllable shortcut (Pu-le).) birth and the physical condition that forces him to be carried as he journeys to meet the returning Aguinaldo. Recognizing Mabini's intelligence and conviction, Aguinaldo appoints him as a trusted adviser in building the new revolutionary government. Conflict soon emerges during the Malolos Congress when Buencamino, Paterno, and other influential ilustrados attempt to push policies that would place economic power in the hands of the elite. Mabini strongly opposes them, arguing that the revolution should serve the common people rather than wealthy interests during the American occupation.

As political divisions deepen, Mabini struggles to convince the inexperienced Aguinaldo to remain faithful to the ideals of the revolution. Act One culminates in a stylized hip-hop rap battle that dramatizes the growing conflict between principle and political ambition.

=== Act Two ===
Act Two shows the tragic breakdown of the early Philippine Republic. Due to heavy political arguments, a principled Mabini leaves the cabinet and is replaced by Paterno. The musical highlights this sad split through an emotional, operatic duet between Mabini and Aguinaldo. Soon after, Mabini is captured and exiled to Guam by American forces for refusing to pledge allegiance to the United States. The show ends with a dying Mabini returning home to succumb to cholera, while the cast steps out of character to challenge the audience about modern-day political issues.

== Characters ==
=== Principal Characters ===
Character	Description
Apolinario Mabini	a brilliant, principled, and wheelchair-bound political adviser to Emilio Aguinaldo who advocated for revolutionary ideology despite his physical paralysis from polio. To highlight his intellectual prowess and represent his historical experience of being socially "othered," the production traditionally casts a female actor in the role so that his voice distinctively cuts through a male-dominated government.
Emilio Aguinaldo	the president of the First Philippine Republic, balancing nationalist ideals with the political and military pressures of leading the revolutionary government during the Philippine–American War. The musical depicts his interactions with Mabini and members of the ilustrado class amid internal political divisions and the threat of American colonization.
Dionisia	Mabini's mother
Pepe	Mabini's assistant who he later adopts
Pule	Mabini's young self

=== The Ilustrados ===
Character	Description
Pedro Paterno	a wealthy politician who led a political faction that dislodged his fierce ideological rival Mabini, over whether to accept American autonomy or fight for total independence.
Felipe Buencamino	a lawyer and diplomat who co-authored the Malolos Constitution, only to later align with Paterno's wealthy ilustrado cabal to successfully orchestrate the ouster of Mabini.
Benito Legarda	a wealthy businessman and politician who served as vice president of the Malolos Congress, where his elite ilustrado economic interests clashed with the unyielding independence stance of Mabini.
Felipe Calderon	a lawyer and one of the writers of Malolos Constitution to give more power to congress, which caused a big fight with Mabini.
Gregorio Araneta	a lawyer and businessman who aligned with the wealthy elite to support a constitution that weakened the executive branch that directly defied Mabini's warnings.

=== Supporting characters ===
Character	Description
Gen. Antonio Luna	a general who respected Mabini's legal mind and political integrity.
Gen. Artemio Ricarte	a general who agreed with Mabini's radical refusal to swear allegiance to the United States.
Gen. Mariano Noriel	a general from Cavite who worked under the revolutionary government while Mabini served as chief advisor.
Gen. Mariano Trias	a general who initially worked alongside Mabini, but later broke away from Mabini's hardline independence stance to support peace terms with the United States.
Gen. Gregorio Del Pilar	a young, dashing general
Gen. Bell (American)	
Gen. MacArthur (American)	
Gen. Taft (American)	
Mark Twain	a famous American author and leader of the Anti-Imperialist League

== Casting history ==
Character	Production			
Character	2015 Original (Jul 3–19, 2015) (Note: Attributed to multiple sources:)	2016 Restaging (Feb 19–Mar 13, 2016)(Dec 2–18, 2016) (Note: Attributed to multiple sources:)	2019 Revival (Aug 16–Sep 1, 2019) (Note: Attributed to multiple sources:)	2026 10th Anniversary Revival (Mar 6–29, 2026) and Special Independence Day Staging (June 12, 2026) (Note: Attributed to multiple sources:)
Venue	Tanghalang Aurelio Tolentino (CCP Little Theater)			Tanghalang Ignacio Gimenez; (CCP Black Box Theater): The Metropolitan Theater
Principal Roles
Apolinario Mabini	Delphine Buencamino	Liesl Batucan u/s: Hazel Grace Maranan	Monique Wilson alt: Hazel Grace Maranan	Shaira Opsimar u/s: Anya Evangelista
Emilio Aguinaldo	Arman Ferrer	Arman Ferrer alt: David Ezra	Arman Ferrer alt: David Ezra	Arman Ferrer alt: David Ezra
Dionisia (Mabini's Mother)	Carol Bello	Carol Bello	Mia Bolaños	Tex Ordoñez-De Leon
Pepe (Mabini's assistant)	Aldo Vencilao	Aldo Vencilao	Paw Castillo	Gelo Molina
Pule (Young Mabini)	Marco Viaña	Phi Palmos	Phi Palmos	Ynna Rafa
The Ilustrados
Pedro Paterno	JV Ibesate	JV Ibesate	JV Ibesate	MC Dela Cruz
Felipe Buencamino	Jonathan Tadioan	Jonathan Tadioan	Jonathan Tadioan	Jonathan Tadioan
Benito Legarda	Alfritz Blanche	—	Meynard Peñalosa	Roby Malubay
Felipe Calderón	Marco Viaña	—	Lian Silverio	Marco Viaña
Gregorio Araneta	Karl Alexis Jingco	—	Anthony Peralta	Cyril Balderama
Supporting and Ensemble
Gen. Antonio Luna	Kristofer Kliatchko	Alfritz Blanche	Kristofer Kliatchko	—
Gen. Artemio Ricarte	—	—	Joshua Tayco	—
Gen. Mariano Noriel	Phi Palmos	—	Juancho Gabriel	—
Gen. Mariano Trias	Ck Español	—	Jasper Cabra	—
Gen. Gregorio Del Pilar	—	—	Ian Hermogenes	—
Gen. Bell (American)	Sigrid Macarena Balbas	—	Sigrid Macarena Balbas	—
Gen. MacArthur (American)	Katreen Dela Cruz	—	Maia Dapul	—
Gen. Taft (American)	EJ Pepito	Hazel Grace Maranan	Eunice Pacia	—
Mark Twain	Merry Mia Sinaguinan	—	Phi Palmos Meynard Peñalosa	—
Padre Valerio Malabanan	Ck Español	—	Lian Silverio	
Inang Bayan	Carol Bello	—	—	—
Aling Sima	Lhorvie Nuevo	—	—	—
Bata	Phi Palmos	—	—	—
Dance Captain	—	—	—	Lhorvie Nuevo-Tadioan
Paco Roman	Renson Gacutana	—	Kul Dela Torre	—
Eduardo Rusca	Kenneth Mangurit	—	Joel Eugenio	—
Sandiko	VJ Estohero Cortel	—	Joshua Tayco	—
Swing	—	—	—	Mark Lorenz Sarah Monay
Ensemble	Antonette Go Jojo Mamangun Richardson Yadao Ronelson Yadao	—	—	Earvin Estioco Rey Correjado Heart Puyong Murline Udin Sofia Sacaguing Rey Correjado Ynna Rafa Anya Evangelista

Key: alt = alternate; u/s = understudy; — = no confirmed casting record

== Creative team history ==
Position	Production / Year				
Position	2015 Original (Jul 3–19, 2015)	2016 Restaging (Feb 19–Mar 13, 2016)(Dec 2–18, 2016)	2016 Dec Restaging (Dec 2–18)	2019 Revival (Aug 16–Sep 1, 2019)	2026 10th Anniversary Revival (Mar 6–29, 2026) andSpecial Independence Day Staging (June 12, 2026)
Librettist	Nicanor Tiongson				
Director	Chris Millado				
Composer	Joed Balsamo				
Musical Director	Joed Balsamo	—	—	Ejay Yatco	—
Assistant Musical Director	—	—	—	Krystal Kane	—
Co-Arrangers	—			Chino David; Emerzon Texon	
Choreographer	Denisa Reyes				Denisa Reyes; Richardson Yadao
Set Designer	Toym Imao				
Costume Designer	James Reyes				
Costume Associate	—				Daniel Gregorio
Additional Costumes	—				Patis Tesoro
Additional Accessories	—				Carlos Siongco
Lighting	Katsch Catoy				
Lighting	—	—	—	—	Roman Cruz
Sound Designer	TJ Ramos			TJ Ramos (Sound Designer, Co-arranger, Sound & Mixing Engineer)	TJ Ramos (Sound & Musical Arrangement)
Video/Projection Designer	GA Fallarme				
Video/Projection Designer	—				JM Jimenez
Associate Projection					Justin Santiago
Dramaturg	—	—	Manny Pambid		
Vocal Coach					Bianca Lopez-Aguila

Key: — = position not credited in that production

== Production ==
=== 2015 Original production ===
In June 2015 media conference, TP announced that it will open its 29th season with Tiongson's Mabining Mandirigma. Tapped by Millado is Delphine Buencamino, an actress-dancer-singer whose stage credits include Rody Vera's Ibalong and Dingdong Novenario's 2014 Virgin Labfest play Wendy Wants to Be a Housewife. Alongside Buencamino's portrayal of Mabini is Arman Ferrer who took on the role of Emilio Aguinaldo.

Completing the production's artistic and creative team led by Millado, Tiongson, and Balsamo are: choreographer Denisa Reyes, set designer Toym Imao, costume designer James Reyes, lighting designer Katsch Catoy, video projection designer GA Fallarme, technical director Barbara Tan-Tiongco, and dramaturg Manny Pambid. The ensemble featured Ballet Philippines danseurs Jojo Mamangun, Richardson Yadao, and Ronelson Yadao. Richardson and Ronelson Yadao also serve as assistant choreographers.

Mabining Mandirigma premiered on 3 July 2015 at the CCP's Tanghalang Aurelio Tolentino and was staged until 19 July 2015.

On portraying Mabini, Buencamino said that "the gravity of the challenge comes in playing the hero as a real person."

=== 2016 Restaging ===
Mabining Mandirigma (2016) poster

Following the success of its 2015 premiere, TP announced on 20 January 2016 that Mabining Mandirigma would return as the culminating production of its 29th theater season. The show ran at the Tanghalang Aurelio Tolentino (CCP Little Theater) from 19 February to March 13, 2016, Fridays to Sundays, with 3:00PM (Matinee) and 8:00PM (Gala) shows. The musical later received another re-run from 2 to 18 December 2016 as part of the company's 30th season.

The musical introduced a new lead performer with actress Liesl Batucan succeeding Buencamino in the role of Mabini, while Ferrer reprised his role as Aguinaldo, alternating with new cast member tenor David Ezra.

Millado said that Buencamino was unable to join the cast for the latest staging following a family tragedy she experienced last year. Buencamino was also choreographer for 3 Stars and a Sun, a musical that coincided its run on 4 February to 6 March 2016.

Batucan previously starred as Luisa in The Fantasticks (1997), earning a Gawad Buhay Award as the Beggar Woman in Sweeney Todd (2009), top-billing Forbidden Broadway (2012), and playing Ester in the musical drama Stageshow (2012).

The production's artistic staff included Jed Balsamo for music, Denisa Reyes for choreography, Toym Imao for set design, Katsch Catoy for lighting design, GA Fallarme for projection design, James Reyes for costume design, Barbie Tan-Tiongco as technical director, and TJ Ramos for sound design.

=== 2019 Revival ===
Mabining Mandirigma (2019) poster

TP announced in June 2019 that 'Mabining Mandirigma would return as the opening production of the company’s 33rd season. The revival formed part of the CCP’s 50th anniversary celebrations and carried the season theme “Kamalayang Pilipino” (“Filipino Consciousness”), which emphasized works centered on Philippine identity, nationalism, and historical memory. The production ran from 16 August 16 to 1 September 2019 at Tanghalang Aurelio Tolentino (CCP Little Theater) in Pasay.

The 2019 production marked the fourth staging of the musical since its original 2015 premiere. Director Chris Millado returned to helm the revival, while Nicanor Tiongson remained as librettist and Joed Balsamo as composer. Toym Imao returned as production designer, continuing the musical’s steampunk-inspired visual aesthetic characterized by industrial imagery, metallic costumes, gears, and mechanical stage elements.

In July 2019, TP announced that stage and film actress Monique Wilson would portray Apolinario Mabini, becoming the third actress to assume the role after Delphine Buencamino and Liesl Batucan. Hazel Maranan also alternated in the role during the run. Arman Ferrer and David Ezra alternated as Emilio Aguinaldo. Additional cast members included members of the Tanghalang Pilipino Actors Company. The continued practice of cross-gender casting for Mabini was retained as an artistic decision emphasizing the revolutionary leader’s intellect and moral authority rather than physical likeness.

=== 2026 10th anniversary revival and special Independence day show ===
Mabining Mandirigma (2026) at the MET special staging poster

On 16 July 2025, TP first publicly announced Mabining Mandirigma's return when it unveiled its 39th season called "TP39: Ignite." In that season launch, TP revealed that the productions would focus on Filipino revolutionary heroes, including Mabini, and identified Mabining Mandirigma as part of the season lineup, along with Pingkian: Isang Musikal, and Gregoria Lakambini: A Pinay Pop Musical. The announcement did not yet include the full cast or detailed performance schedule.

On 14 January 2026, the full cast announcement was released, confirming that the musical would return as the finale of TP's 39th season and that it was being mounted in celebration of its 10th anniversary.

For its 10th anniversary staging, Shaira Opsimar took on the titular role, with understudy Anya Evangelista. On his fifth time portraying the role, Arman Ferrer returned as Emilio Aguinaldo, alternating with David Ezra, marking his fourth run. Joining Opsimar, Ferrer and Ezra were Tex Ordoñez-De Leon as Mabini's mother Dionisia, MC Dela Cruz and Roby Malubay as the Ilustrados, alongside members of the TP Actors Company—Marco Viaña, Jonathan Tadioan, Lhorvie Nuevo Tadioan, Mark Lorenz, Sarah Monay, Heart Puyong, Earvin Estioco, Gelo Molina, Rey Correjado, Ynna Rafa, Anya Evangelista, Sofia Sacaguing, and Murline Udin—as members of the ensemble.

The production's creative team includes Nicanor Tiongson as playwright, Joed Balsamo for music, and Chris Millado as director. The set design is by Toym Imao, while choreography is by Denisa Reyes and Richardson Yadao. Costume design is by James Reyes, with sound and musical arrangement by TJ Ramos. Lighting design is by Roman Cruz, and projection design is by GA Fallarme and JM Jimenez. CJ Despuez serves as technical director, with Toni Go-Yadao as associate director. Justin Santiago is credited as associate projection designer, Daniel Gregorio as costume associate, and Bianca Lopez-Aguila as voice coach.

The 2026 run opened on 6 March 2026 and ended its season run on 29 March 2026, being touted as "a braver, more intimate staging" by using a smaller venue at the Tanghalang Ignacio Gimenez (CCP Black Box Theater).

A special Philippine Independence day show was organized and shown at the Manila Metropolitan Theater on 12 June 2026.

== Reception ==
=== Awards and nominations ===
==== 2015 Original Production ====
As announced on 12 March 2016, the 2015 original production of Mabining Mandirigma was nominated for 13 Gawad Buhay Awards in 2016, including Outstanding Musical Direction (Joed Balsamo), Outstanding Choreography for a Play or Musical (Denisa Reyes), Outstanding Costume Design (James Reyes), Outstanding Lighting Design (Katsch Catoy), Outstanding Sound Design (TJ Ramos), Outstanding Set Design (Toym Imao), Outstanding Female Lead Performance in a Musical (Delphine Buencamino), Outstanding Male Featured Performance in a Musical (Arman Ferrer), Outstanding Stage Direction for a Musical (Chris Millado), Outstanding Ensemble Performance for a Musical, and Outstanding Musical—Original or Translation/Adaptation.

Upon the announcement of the nominees, the musical secured automatic wins for Outstanding Original Libretto for Nicanor Tiongson and Outstanding Original Musical Composition for Joed Balsamo, as both categories had no other nominees.

At the ceremony held on 28 April 2016 at the Greenbelt Onstage Theater, Mabining Mandirigma was the most honored production winning 12 out of 13 nominations at the 8th Gawad Buhay Awards.

Year	Award ceremony	Category	Nominee	Result
2016	8th Gawad Buhay Awards	Outstanding Original Libretto	Nicanor Tiongson	Won (Note: Automatic winner as lone nominee.)
2016	8th Gawad Buhay Awards	Outstanding Original Musical Composition	Joed Balsamo	Won (Note: Automatic winner as lone nominee.)
2016	8th Gawad Buhay Awards	Outstanding Musical Direction	Joed Balsamo	Won
2016	8th Gawad Buhay Awards	Outstanding Choreography for a Play or Musical	Denisa Reyes	Won
2016	8th Gawad Buhay Awards	Outstanding Costume Design	James Reyes	Won
2016	8th Gawad Buhay Awards	Outstanding Lighting Design	Katsch Catoy	Nominated
2016	8th Gawad Buhay Awards	Outstanding Sound Design	TJ Ramos	Won
2016	8th Gawad Buhay Awards	Outstanding Set Design	Toym Inao	Won
2016	8th Gawad Buhay Awards	Outstanding Female Lead Performance in a Musical	Delphine Buencamino	Won
2016	8th Gawad Buhay Awards	Outstanding Male Featured Performance in a Musical	Arman Ferrer	Won
2016	8th Gawad Buhay Awards	Outstanding Stage Direction for a Musical	Chris Millado	Won
2016	8th Gawad Buhay Awards	Outstanding Ensemble Performance for a Musical	Mabining Mandirigma	Won
2016	8th Gawad Buhay Awards	Outstanding Musical—Original or Translation/Adaptation	Mabining Mandirigma	Won

=== Critical reception ===
==== 2015 Original Production ====
Modern Filipina gave a positive review, stating that Mabining Mandirigma successfully transformed Philippine history into an “entertaining, and inspiring” steampunk musical that gives Apolinario Mabini long-overdue recognition while making history engaging for modern audiences. The production was praised for “great songs,” “striking” set design, strong performances, and creative staging, particularly highlighting its “feast for the eyes,” effective pacing, and modern reinterpretation of historical themes. The review offered minor reservations, noting that audiences “may have to adjust” to Delphine Buencamino portraying Mabini and implying that some familiarity with Philippine history may shape viewers’ understanding of the narrative.

Writing for The Philippine STAR, Mario Hernando described Mabining Mandirigma as a historical musical about Apolinario Mabini that creatively blends history, music, and steampunk elements. He praised its intellectual depth, strong performances—especially Delphine Buencamino's portrayal of Mabini—and its educational ambition. He also noted concerns about the gender interpretation, repetitive Mabini–Aguinaldo exchanges, and restrained use of anachronisms, though he found the production engaging and effective overall.

== See also ==
- Apolinario Mabini
- Emilio Aguinaldo
- Cultural Center of the Philippines
- Gawad Buhay
- Philippine-American War
- First Philippine Republic
