= Barredo =

Barredo is a surname. Notable people with the surname include:

- Baby Barredo (1941–2021), Filipina theater actress and producer
- Carlos Barredo (born 1981), Spanish cyclist
- Maniya Barredo (born 1951), Filipina ballet dancer and instructor
- Michael Barredo (active from 1997), Filipino sports executive

== See also ==
- Barredos, a place in Spain
