= Shiela Valderrama =

Filipino musical theater actress

Shiela Valderrama-Martinez
- Born: Shiela Valderrama
- Education: De La Salle University
- Occupations: Musical theater actress, singer
- Years active: 1994–present
- Spouse: Lorenz Martinez (m. 2008)
- Children: 1

Shiela Valderrama-Martinez is a Filipino musical theater actress, singer, and corporate professional. She is known for her work in theater productions in the Philippines and abroad, including roles in The King and I, Shrek The Musical, and Passion. She has won a Gawad Buhay Award and an Aliw Award for her performances. Outside of theater, she works as the head of the export department for Marby Food Ventures.

== Early life and education ==
Shiela Valderrama-Martinez attended O.B. Montessori for her primary and secondary education. During her time in school, she participated in various theater productions. She later attended De La Salle University, where she graduated with a degree in Business Management, majoring in Human Resources. Her family owns Marby Food Ventures, a bread and food manufacturing company started by her parents, Mario and Baby Valderrama.

== Career ==
=== Early work and Hong Kong Disneyland ===
Valderrama began her professional career at the age of 14 when she auditioned for Repertory Philippines. She was cast in the ensemble and as a cover for the lead role in Cinderella. She also appeared in Aladdin during this period. Before her major break, she performed in productions of Sweet Charity and The Sound of Music, where she played Baroness Elsa Schraeder. She took a brief hiatus from theater to finish her college studies.

In 2001, she returned to theater in a production of The Secret Garden. Following this, Valderrama joined the opening team of Hong Kong Disneyland. She worked at the theme park for three years. During her time there, she performed roles such as "Bebe" in The Golden Mickeys and Nala in Festival of the Lion King. She also toured with the Asian production of Cinderella, starring alongside Lea Salonga.

=== Theater roles in the Philippines ===
In 2012, Valderrama played the lead role of Anna Leonowens in the Resorts World Manila production of The King and I. In 2014, she portrayed Princess Fiona in the Atlantis Productions staging of Shrek The Musical. During this time, she also appeared in the play Noises Off as Belinda Blair. She joined the cast of the Philippine educational theater hit Rak of Aegis as Kapitana Mary Jane.

Valderrama's other roles include the title character in Adarna for Repertory Philippines' Children's Theater and the First Woman in Ballet Philippines' rock opera Tales of the Manuvu. She also starred as the Virgin Mary in Guadalupe: The Musical. In 2018, she played Lily dela Rosa in Binondo: A Tsinoy Musical and reprised the role in 2019. For this role, she received a nomination at the Aliw Awards.

In 2019, she played the role of Fosca in the Philippine Opera Company's production of Stephen Sondheim's Passion. Her performance as Fosca won her the Gawad Buhay Award for Best Female Lead in a Musical in 2020. She has also performed in international productions, including The 25th Annual Putnam County Spelling Bee in Singapore. In 2020, she participated in the show Show Stoppers at the RCBC Theater.

In 2023, she played the role of Sita in the rock opera ballet Rama Hari, which features the work of five National Artists of the Philippines. During the 2024 tour of Rama Hari, she performed dual roles as Sita and Kaikeyi. She also played the goddess Erzulie in the 9 Works Theatrical staging of Once on This Island in 2024. In 2025, she played the role of Diana Goodman in The Sandbox Collective's production of Next to Normal.

=== Concerts, events, and screen work ===
Valderrama has performed in various concerts, including the "Triple Threats" series at the Cultural Center of the Philippines titled Part of My World in 2024. She also co-headlined a concert titled As We Are with singer Arman Ferrer. Her other concert appearances include Disco Glam at Resorts World Manila and the Disney Orchestra live concert in Kuala Lumpur. In 2024, she was a featured artist at a Christmas tree lighting ceremony in Pasay City.

On television, she appeared in the ABS-CBN drama series Wildflower as a lawyer. She was cast in the Erik Matti projects Bagman and Buy Bust. She also worked on the film adaptation of Pagbabalik Tanaw sa Mga Unang Hari ng Balagtasan for the Cultural Center of the Philippines. She has also participated in stage readings, such as Margo sa Tubig, and performed in Isang Gabi ng Sarsuwela.

== Personal life ==
Valderrama is married to theater actor Lorenz Martinez. They married in 2008 and have one daughter. The couple met while performing in The Secret Garden in 2001. In addition to her acting career, Valderrama works for her family's business, Marby Food Ventures, where she manages the export department.

== Stage credits ==
| Year | Title | Role | Location | Notes |
|---|---|---|---|---|
| 2019 | Passion | Fosca | Manila (Philippine Opera Company) | |
| 2015 | Into the Woods | The Baker's Wife | Manila (Upstart Prod) | |
| 2014 | Shrek the Musical | Princess Fiona | Manila (Atlantis) | |
| 2013 | Carrie | Miss Lyn Gardner | Manila (Atlantis) | |
| 2010 | The Wedding Singer | Julia Sullivan | Manila (9 Works Theatrical) | |
| 2009 | The 25th Annual Putnam County Spelling Bee | Marcy Park | Manila (Atlantis) | |
| 2008 | Cinderella | Cinderella | | |
| 2005 | Mamma Mia! | Donna Sherridon | Manila (Stages) | |
| 2004 | Fame | Serena | Manila (Repertory Philippines) | |
| 2002 | Snow White and the Seven Dwarfs | Snow White | Manila (Repertory Philippines) | |
| 2001 | The Secret Garden | Mrs. Shelly/Ensemble | Manila (Repertory Philippines) | |
| 1999 | Hansel and Gretel | Dewfairy | Manila (Philippine Opera Company) | |
| 1998 | Miong | Kampuput | Manila (Repertory Philippines) | |
| 1993 | Aladdin | Princess Mei-Ling | Manila (Repertory Philippines) | |
| 1993 | Cinderella | Cinderella | Manila (Repertory Philippines) | |

== Awards and nominations ==
| Year | Award Giving Body | Category | Nominated Work | Result | Ref. |
|---|---|---|---|---|---|
| 2019 | Aliw Awards | Best Actress in a Musical | Binondo: A Tsinoy Musical | Nominated | |
| 2020 | LEAF Awards | Best Actress in a Musical | Passion | Won | |
| 2020 | Gawad Buhay Awards | Best Female Lead in a Musical | Passion | Won | |
| 2022 | Aliw Awards | Best Female Host | N/A | Won | |
