= Nonoy Froilan =

Filipino dancer and teacher (born 1950)

- Born: Rafael Catalino Froilan; October 24, 1950 (age 75); Calbiga, Samar, Philippines
- Citizenship: Philippines
- Occupations: Filipino choreographer, dancer, teacher, actor
- Spouse: Edna Vida
- Children: 2
- Parent: Amparo Froilan
- Relatives: Alice Reyes (sister-in-law)
- Awards: Order of National Artists of the Philippines, Dance (2026)
- Career
- Former groups: UE Dance Troupe; Karilagan International; Ballet Philippines

Rafael "Nonoy" Catalino Froilan is a Filipino dancer, choreographer and actor. He is a National Artist of the Philippines for Dance

== Early life and education ==
Rafael Catalino Froilan was born in October 24, 1950, in Calbiga in Samar province. He attended the University of the East where he graduated in 1971 with a degree in business administration, and later the University of the Philippines Diliman where he attained a degree in education in 1977. He also attended the CCP Dance School in 1972.

== Dance career ==
Froilan started a career as a dancer back in college, when he joined the UE Dance Troupe in 1968 as a folk dancer. He trained in ballet and jazz under Tony Llacer and Julie Borromeo.

He worked at the Dance Arts Studio in Mandaluyong in 1970-1972.

From 1971-1973, he also joined Karilagan International as a dancer.

In 1973, he joined the Ballet Philippines as its principal dancer. He was also a teacher in modern dance from 1975 to 1980.

Among the major roles he has played are Prince Albrecht in Giselle, Basilio in Don Quixote, Franz in Coppelia, Prince Siegfried in Swan Lake and the Young Man in Maurice Bejart's ballet adaptation of Songs of a Wayfarer. He also played Don Juan in Carmen, together with his wife Edna Vida playing the titular role; his sister-in-law Alice Reyes created the choreography.

He has also danced with Dame Margot Fonteyn and Yoko Morishita.

On September 10, 2026, Nonoy Froilan was proclaimed as one of the ten new National Artists of the Philippines.

== Acting career ==
He and his wife Edna Vida have played the lead roles in Juan Miguel Severo's Hintayan ng Langit, which was staged at the Cultural Center of the Philippines's Virgin Labfest XI.

== Personal life ==
Nonoy Froilan is married to Edna Vida, the youngest of the three Reyes sisters who are also dancers. Froilan and Reyes have two children. His sister-in-law Alice is also a National Artist for Dance.
