= El Filibusterismo (opera) =

1970 opera by Felipe Padilla de León

- Opera by Felipe Padilla de León
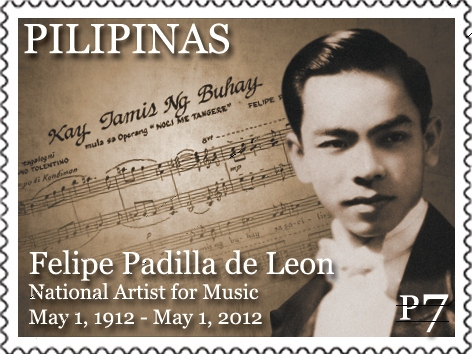
- The composer
- Librettist: Anthony Morli
- Language: Tagalog
- Based on: El filibusterismo by José Rizal
- Premiere: 3 November 1970; Cultural Center of the Philippines Main Theater, Manila

El Filibusterismo (Subversion) is an opera in 3 acts by Felipe Padilla de León with libretto by Anthony Morli. The opera was closely based on a novel by José Rizal by the same name. It is the sequel to Noli me Tangere, another novel by Rizal which was also adapted as an opera by the same composer.

== Roles ==
Role	Voice type	Premiere cast, 3 November 1970 Conductor: Felipe Padilla de León
Simoun	baritone	Constantino Bernardez
Basilio	tenor	Rodolfo Reyno
Kabesang Tales	baritone	Gamaliel Viray
Juli	soprano	Irma Potenciano
Isagani	tenor	Robert Natividad
Tandang Selo	bass baritone	Emmanuel Gregorio
Paulita	soprano	Fides Cuyugan-Asensio

== History ==
The libretto by Antony Morli was the first prize winner for a libretto contest sponsored by the Musical Promotional Foundation of the Philippines held in 1966. The work was premiered on November 3, 1970, at the CCP Main Theater with the composer conducting the CCP Philharmonic Orchestra. Jovita Fuentes was the chairman and producer of the opera, Jaime V. Arsenio the stage director, and Teresita Agana-Santos the chorus director.

== Music ==
The music of El Fili had a more intense and contemporary style, compared to de Leon's Noli written about a decade and a half earlier. The composer found himself more at liberty to make the music more reflective of the novel's intentions. The romantic themes sung by Crisostomo Ibarra in Noli were reworked in El Fili to be darker and more violent sung by Simoun. Several folk songs and dances were also included in the score like the balitaw, kundiman, and the Kumintang but transformed and given in a more contemporary and modern way.
