= Georgette Sanchez =

- Born: Georgina Johanna Garcia Sanchez; Bacolod, Philippines
- Known for: Ballet
- Movement: Classical and Modern
- Awards: Silver medalist, 9th Paris International Dance Competition (Concours International de Danse de Paris)

Georgina Johanna Garcia Sanchez is a ballerina from the Philippines. From 1995 to 2002 she was a company dancer of the ballet company, Ballet Philippines. She was invited by European choreographer and director Nicolas Musin to join the Abcdancecompany in St. Potten, Austria where she has been featured since 2002.

== Career ==
Gorgette Sanchez wore her first tutu at the age of 3 at Bacolod, Philippines. In Bacolod, she began to learn the discipline of ballet. It wasn't until the early 1990s when she transferred to Manila and further honed her dancing skills with the guidance of Agnes Locsin where Cecile Sicangco and Denisa Reyes was also trained alongside her. She had been in Ballet Philippines seven years as a company member, two years as an apprentice, and two years as a scholar.

In 2000, Georgette Sanchez won the silver medal in the 9th Paris International Dance Competition, for her performances in Agnes Locsin's September and Alden Lugnasin's Aku. This distinction helped her gain an invitation from Nicolas Musin to join the abcdancecompany in St. Pölten, Austria.

Sanchez returned in 2008 to teach at Ballet Philippines’ summer dance workshop and also during the same season, taught with her sister Gianne at the Garcia-Sanchez School of Dance in Bacolod city. After the end of that season she left again for Germany for another take on the European dance scene.

== Notable performances ==
Georgette's most notable performances was portraying Sita in the world premiere of "Unraveling the Maya" in Kuala Lumpur, Malaysia. This paved way for her international career performing in September and Alden Lugnasin's Aku.

Coming back in 2008, Georgette has been part of all of the 2008 season's productions including Agnes Locsin's landmark "La Revolucion" in August, "Night Creature" and "Thresholds II" in October, "Coppelia" in December, and in Ballet Philippines’ "Neo-Filipino" which was their season finale. In "Neo-Filipino", Georgette takes the lead role in Alice Reyes’ Amada which is centered on the ritual of the Tadtarin based on Nick Joaquin's short story "Summer Solstice". She also performed KatiTaog within "Neo-Filipino" by Ballet Philippines' Artistic Director Max Luna III, and choreographer Alden Lugnasin's Ulaging.
