= Bagong Pagsilang =

Philippine patriotic song

- Unofficial march anthem of The New Society (Ang Bagong Lipunan)
- Lyrics: Levi Celerio, 1973
- Music: Felipe Padilla de León, 1973
- Adopted: 1973
- Relinquished: 1986

Audio sample
- Instrumental and vocal version of Bagong Pagsilang: file; help

"Bagong Pagsilang" (English: New Birth or Rebirth), also known as the "March of the New Society" and incorrectly referred to by its chorus "Sa Bagong Lipunan" (In the New Society), is a march commissioned during the presidency of Ferdinand Marcos for the Kilusang Bagong Lipunan or New Society Movement, a movement introduced by Marcos upon the declaration of martial law in 1972. The lyrics were written by Levi Celerio and the music was composed by Felipe Padilla de León in 1973.

A new rendition of the song was performed by the rock band Plethora and was used as the campaign anthem by his son, Bongbong Marcos, during his 2022 presidential campaign. This was even used as an inspection march of President Bongbong Marcos during the 78th Leyte Landing Anniversary on October 20, 2022, and during his camp visit to the Eastern Mindanao Command in Davao City on October 27, 2022.

== Compositional history ==
According to the composer's eldest son, Felipe Mendoza de Leon, two days after the declaration of martial law, at 2 a.m., two military trucks came to their house asking for a "hymn and a march for the New Society" as requested by First Lady Imelda Marcos to be delivered by Sunday. Felipe asked his son for help, with the father focusing on the hymn and the son working on the first 16-bars of the march. After the hymn was finished, he completed the rest of the march his son had started. The composer is said to have put subversive elements to Bagong Pagsilang, just like he did on his 1942 "Awit sa Paglikha ng Bagong Pilipinas". According to his eldest son on a lecture, the composer secretly quoted a portion of the protest song "Bayan Ko" in a part of the song.

The march, along with its complementing hymn ("Bagong Lipunan") also composed by Felipe Padilla de Leon, was featured on the 1973 proprietary vinyl album Mga Awitin At Tugtugin Ng Pilipinas Sa Bagong Lipunan performed by The Philippine Constabulary Band and The Philippine Constabulary Choral Ensemble. The march, hymn, and other patriotic songs were published in 1974 in the book "Mga Awit sa Bagong Lipunan" ("Songs in the New Society").

== Broadcast ==
During martial law, the song was played every day on all radio and television stations. In 2018, the song and an accompanying music video was up on the Youtube channel The United States of Fascism. The song was played at political campaign rallies for Bongbong Marcos and Sara Duterte in 2022.

According to writer Boni Ilagan, the song, whose lyrics proclaimed the dictator's vision of a new society, was heard daily while he was jailed as a political detainee. According to Judy Taguiwalo, the song reminds her of the torture, killings, and other human rights abuses of the Marcos dictatorship.

== Lyrics ==
"Bagong Pagsilang"
Official Filipino lyrics

Koro:
May bagong silang.
May bago nang buhay,
Bagong bansa, bagong galaw
Sa Bagong Lipunan!
Magbabago ang lahat, tungo sa pag-unlad,
At ating itanghal: Bagong Lipunan!

Koro

Ang gabi'y nagmaliw nang ganap,
At lumipas na ang magdamag.
Madaling araw ay nagdiriwang.
May umagang namasdan.
Ngumiti na ang pag-asa
Sa umagang anong ganda!

Koro

"New Society"
Literal English translation

Chorus:
There is new birth.
There is now a new life,
A new country, a new movement
In the New Society!
Everything will change towards progress
And let us extol: [A] New Society!

Chorus

The night has departed completely,
And the midnight has passed.
The dawn celebrates,
For morning was seen.
Hope smiles down upon
On this morning, oh so beautiful!

Chorus
