= Gawad Buhay =

- Awarded for: Best in Philippine theater
- Country: Philippines
- Presented by: Philstage
- First award: 2009; 17 years ago

The Philstage Awards for the Performing Arts, more commonly known as the Gawad Buhay, are awards presented annually by Philstage, an organization of performing arts companies in the Philippines, at the National Theater in the Cultural Center of the Philippines to recognize outstanding performance in Philippine theater. First awarded in 2009, they are considered as the highest award in performing arts in the Philippines.

== History ==
Philstage
- Philippine Legitimate Stage Artists Group
- Location: Philippines
- Award: Gawad Buhay

The Philstage, officially known as the Philippine Legitimate Stage Artists Group, was established in 1997 by eight theater companies: Ballet Manila, Gantimpala Theater, Musical Theatre Philippines, Organisasyong Pilipinong Mang-aawit, Philippine Educational Theater Association (PETA), Repertory Philippines, Tanghalang Pilipino and Trumpets. It is the only nationally recognized organization for performing arts in the Philippines. Its primary mission was to promote the performing arts industry in the country, lobbying laws and policies that protects professionals.

One of the requirement for a company to join Philstage is to have staged at least three productions, and be in existence for at least three years. There are nine members currently. These are six of the eight founding companies, 9 Works Theatrical, Ballet Philippines, Full House Theater Company, The Necessary Theatre, Philippine Ballet Theatre, Philippine Opera Company, Stages, and Red Turnip Theater.

In 2008, Philstage established Gawad Buhay, becoming the country's first and only industry awards in theater. The first edition was held on February 18, 2009, at the Aurelio Tolentino Theater of the Tanghalang Pambansa. The award also publishes citations every quarter, where the jury selects the final nominees for annual Gawad Buhay awards ceremony which is usually held in April.

== Award categories ==
=== Play ===
- Outstanding Production of a Play
- Outstanding Male Lead Performance in a Play
- Outstanding Female Lead Performance in a Play
- Outstanding Male Featured Performance in a Play
- Outstanding Female Featured Performance in a Play
- Outstanding Ensemble Performance for a Play

=== Musical ===
- Outstanding Musical Production
- Outstanding Male Lead Performance in a Musical
- Outstanding Female Lead Performance in a Musical
- Outstanding Male Featured Performance in a Musical
- Outstanding Female Featured Performance in a Musical
- Outstanding Ensemble Performance for a Musical
- Outstanding Musical Direction
- Outstanding Book of a Musical
- Outstanding Original Score
- Outstanding Production of Existing Material for a Musical

=== Dance/Opera ===
- Outstanding Dance Production
- Outstanding Male Lead Performance in a Dance Production
- Outstanding Female Lead Performance in a Dance Production
- Outstanding Featured Performance in a Dance Production
- Outstanding Original Libretto

=== Production ===
- Outstanding Stage Direction
- Outstanding Original Choreography
- Outstanding Original Script
- Outstanding Set Design
- Outstanding Costume Design
- Outstanding Lighting Design
- Outstanding Sound Design
- Outstanding Projection and Video Design

=== Retired ===
- Outstanding Production of a One-Act Play
- Outstanding Translation/ Adaptation
