= Fides Cuyugan-Asensio =

Filipino singer (born 1931)

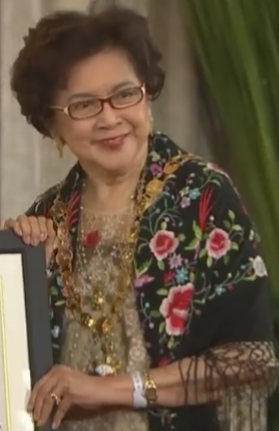
- Cuyugan-Asensio in 2022
- Born: Fides Belza Cuyugan; August 1, 1931 (age 95); Lucena, Tayabas, Philippine Islands
- Occupations: Soprano, librettist, director, teacher
- Spouse(s): Manuel D. Asensio, Jr.
- Awards: Order of National Artists of the Philippines

Fides Belza Cuyugan-Asensio (born August 1, 1929) is a Filipino coloratura soprano, director, librettist, TV host, translator, and teacher.

== Biography ==
Fides Belza Cuyugan is born on August 1, 1931, in Lucena, Philippines. She is the daughter of Gervasio Santos Cuyugan and Jacinta Belza. During the war she directed, wrote, performed, and designed short musicals and plays. She studied at the Philippine Women's University and finished two courses - a Bachelor of Arts in English, specializing in Drama in 1950 and a Bachelor of Music, Major in voice and minor in piano in 1951.

Her graduation recital in 1951 was well-received. It appeared in the front page of The Manila Times declaring "A star is born". More significantly, she was praised by the grand dame Jovita Fuentes (who was in the audience), who proclaimed that the young soprano would "inherit my mantle someday." After graduating she received a scholarship from the Curtis Institute of Music in Pennsylvania where she graduated in 1955 with an Artist's Diploma, major in voice with special studies in stage movement and eurhythmics. She married Manuel D. Asensio, Jr. in 1954 and after graduating from Curtis Institute she returned to Manila.

Since 1955, she has become one of the leading performers and producers of opera in the country. She made her operatic debut in 1955 singing as Adele in Strauss' Die Fledermaus. She also performed in many world premiere performances of Filipino operas, like in Rosendo Santos' Mapulang Bituin, Eliseo Pajaro's Binhi ng Kalayaan, Kasilag's Dularawan, and most notably as Sisa in Felipe de Leon's Noli me Tangere in 1957. She has also sung lead roles in Menotti's The Telephone, Donizetti's Lucia di Lammermoor, Mozart's Die Entführung aus dem Serail, Verdi's La Traviata, Britten's Turn of the Screw, and Debussy's L'Enfant Prodigue and many more. She also directed productions of several Filipino and Western operas.

In 1969-1974 she appeared as one of the hosts in the TV show Sunday Sweet Sunday and in 1989-2002 in the TV show A Little Night of Music. She also appeared in four films: in Oro Plata Mata (1982), Niño (2011), Aparisyon (2012), and in Mana (2014).

In 1986, Fides Asensio formed the Music Theater Foundation of the Philippines (MTFP), a non-profit organization dedicated to promote, stage, and give scholarships to young classical performers. In 1988, she was appointed Chairman of Voice and Music Theater Department at the U.P. College of Music, a position she held until she retired in 1997. After her retirement, she was granted the title of Professor Emeritus by the U.P. Board of Regents. She is the artistic director of the Opera Guild of the Philippines and the president of the MTFP since 1987.

== Honors and awards ==
Asensio is among the people listed in the 1999 book Outstanding Woman of the Philippines by Victoria Paz, She was also awarded the Pama-As Gintong Bai Award for the Musical Arts by the NCCA in 2005 and the Gawad CCP Para sa Sining Award in 2015.

She was also recognized as a National Artist for Music in 2022.

== Librettos ==
Fides is also known for writing opera librettos for several Filipino composers. Some of the librettos she wrote are listed here:

- Lucrecia Kasilag's Larawan ng kababihan: Maskara at Mukha (1981)
- Lucrecia Kasilag's Why Flowers Bloom in May (2008)
- Francisco Feliciano's La Loba Negra (1984)
- Ryan Cayabyab's Spoliarium (2003)
- Rey Paguio's Mayo - Bisperas ng Liwanag (1997)
- Raymond and Jeannelle Roldan's "Song of Joseph" (2009)
- Raymond and Jeannelle Roldan's "Legend of M: Marya Makiling at ang mga Nuno sa Punso" (2013)
