= Baby Barredo =

Filipino theater actress and producer (1941–2021)

- Born: April 28, 1941
- Died: May 23, 2021 (aged 80); Taguig, Metro Manila, Philippines
- Education: University of Indiana; American Conservatory of Dramatic Arts (New York)
- Occupations: Theater actress, director, producer
- Organization: Repertory Philippines
- Relatives: Maniya Barredo (niece); Gerard Salonga (nephew)

Carmen "Baby" Johnson Barredo (April 28, 1941 – May 23, 2021) was a Filipino theater actress and producer known for co-founding Repertory Philippines, a major English-language theater company in the Philippines.

== Early life and education ==
Baby Barredo's first involvement in theater was when she was five years old, when she portrayed the angel Gabriel for a school Christmas pageant. She attended the St. Scholastica's College for her elementary and high school education.

Barredo had various people as mentors; she studied voice under Fides Asencio and Ines Zialcita, music under Lucrecia Kasilag, and drama under Daisy Avellana. Barredo attended the University of Indiana in the United States where she studied voice, and later attended the American Conservatory of Dramatic Arts in New York to complete her studies in drama.

== Career ==
Barredo returned to the Philippines after pursuing studies in the United States. She co-founded the Repertory Philippines with Zeneida Amador in 1967 which became reputed for its English-language productions. Amador was Barredo's long-time friend whom she had met in her 20s. Under her watch, Repertory Philippines produced several figures in Filipino theater including Pinky Amador, Maya Barredo, Jonjon Briones, Red Concepcion, Bart Guingona, Junix Inocian, Cocoy Laurel, Gia Macuja, Lea Salonga, Monique Wilson, and Rem Zamora.

In the 1970s, Barredo was invited to join the Philippine Educational Theater Association but had to decline as she had, by then, established Repertory Philippines with Zeneida Amador.

Barredo did acting for Repertory Philippines. Among the roles she played were as Violet Weston in the August Osage County, Maria in The Sound of Music, Evita Peron in Evita, Anna in The King & I, Maria Callas in Master Class, Mme. Thenardier in Les Misérables, Bloody Mary in South Pacific. She had a ten-year hiatus in acting following the death of Amador. Aside from acting, Barredo also served as stage director, musical director, and costume designer for several Repertory Philippines productions.

She is a recipient of the Gawad Parangal sa mga Tampok na Yaman ng Teatro Pilipino (transl. Tribute to the Living Legends of Philippine Theatre) of the International University Theater Association (IUTA).

== Death ==
Baby Barredo died on May 23, 2021, at the St. Luke's Medical Center in Taguig due to multiple organ failure caused by sepsis.

== Personal life ==
Baby Barredo's relatives include ballerina Maniya Barredo, her niece.

Barredo and her Repertory Philippines co-founder, Zeneida Amador, lived together until Amador passed in 2008, each adopting a daughter and son, respectively. It was long rumoured that they were in a relationship, however, Barredo denied these rumours, insisting that the relationship was strictly platonic.
