= Coppelia =

Coppelia may refer to:

- Coppélia, an 1870 comic ballet
- Coppelia, a 2021 ballet film combining live dance with animation
- Coppelia (ice cream parlor), in Havana, Cuba
- 815 Coppelia, a minor planet (asteroid)
- Coppelia, the Animated Doll, a 1900 French short silent film
