= Noli Me Tangere (opera) =

Opera by Felipe Padilla de León

- Opera by Felipe Padilla de León
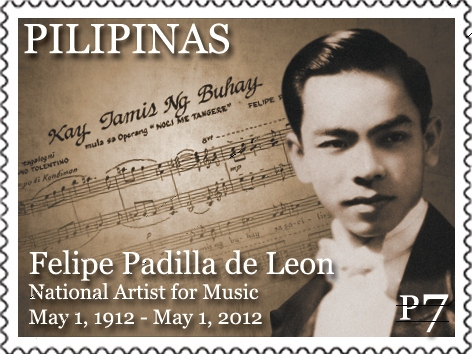
- The composer, Felipe Padilla de León pictured in a stamp. An aria from the opera is on the background.
- Librettist: Guillermo Tolentino
- Language: Tagalog
- Based on: Noli Me Tángere by José Rizal
- Premiere: 5 February 1957; Far Eastern University Auditorium, Manila

Noli Me Tangere (Touch Me Not) is an opera in 3 acts by Felipe Padilla de León with libretto by Guillermo Tolentino. The opera was closely based on a novel by José Rizal by the same name. The opera was sung entirely in Tagalog and is considered as the first full-length Filipino opera.

== Composition history ==
The librettist wrote the libretto during the war and the composer started writing the opera in 1953. However two arias from the opera, Maria Clara's "Kay Tamis ng Buhay" and Sisa's "Awit ng Gabi" were written earlier, with the former being written in 1949 and the latter written in 1952 for Fides Cuyugan-Asensio's graduation recital.

Felipe Padilla de León also wrote an opera based on Rizal's sequel to the novel: El filibusterismo (Subversion) in 1970.

== Performance history ==
The opera was premiered on 5 February 1957 at the Far Eastern University auditorium, with the Manila Symphony Orchestra conducted by the composer. The success of the first made possible for several other performances, all with full-house attendances. However, it had to wait for several decades until it was performed again; in 1975 at the Cultural Center of the Philippines under the baton of the composer. It was performed again in 1987, again at the CCP and at the University of the Philippines to commemorate the centenary of the novel's publication.

No performances ensued at the Philippines for many years until it was finally revived by the Dulaang UP in 2011 & 2012. It was further staged at Resorts World Manila in 2014, and then finally back at the CCP in 2017 and twice in 2019.

Performances were staged overseas in the United States. It was performed in several cities in 1988 (using the 1987 production with reduced performers). More recently, it was performed in Chicago (2012), New York (2013), at the Kennedy Center at Washington D.C. (2014), at Richmond (2016), and at Boston (2017).

== Roles ==
Role	Voice type	Premiere cast, 5 February 1957 Conductor: Felipe Padilla de León	
Juan Crisostomo Ibarra	tenor	David Javier	
Maria Clara	soprano	Juanita Javier	
Sisa	coloratura soprano	Fides Cuyugan-Asensio	
Padre Damaso	bass	Milo Cristobal	
Elias	baritone	Kapitan Tiago	Philip Santos
Pilosopo Tasyo	bass	Vicente Antiporda	
Basilio	boy soprano		

== Synopsis ==
=== Act 1 ===
==== At the spacious sala of Kapitan Tiago's house in San Diego ====
At the house of Kapitan Tiyago, a reception is held to celebrate the return of Crisostomo Ibarra after a 7-year stay in Europe. Among the guests was Padre Damaso, who denounced the character of the Filipino people (Indio) derisively. During a much heated conversation among the guests Crisostomo Ibarra arrives accompanied by Kapitan Tiyago. Unaware of the situation, Ibarra approached Damaso, only to be rebuffed. The sudden death of Ibarra's father continues to puzzle him, and the news of Maria Clara coming to the house mitigates his deep thoughts. Ibarra announced that he is going to build a schoolhouse to honor his father's memory.

The guests move to the dining room as Maria Clara arrives to the scene accompanied by Tiya Isabel. Ibarra rushes to welcome them. The lovers now alone reminisce on sweet memories spent together. The act ends with Ibarra remembering that All Souls' Day is nearing, and leaves to pay respects to his late father.

=== Act 2 ===
==== Scene 1 - A street on the outskirts of San Diego ====
At the cemetery, two grave diggers were resting. One of them tells a story of how he exhumed a grave that is barely a month old on a stormy night. Ibarra then enters and asks for the grave of his father. One of the diggers replied that he dug the grave to put it to the Chinese Cemetery (a cemetery for heretics) by orders of a priest. This enraged Ibarra and the digger eventually told him that he had thrown the body to a river instead to the Chinese Cemetery. Ibarra leaves enraged as Pilosopo Tasyo enters, happily waiting for the upcoming storm. As the rain started to fall Pilosopo Tasyo noticed Basilio and Crispin. He said to them that they should go to their mother's house as she has prepared a wonderful dinner. However, shortly after this Crispin gets accused of theft by one of the priests and both of them are punished. Basilio escaped but is injured by a gunshot wound. Meanwhile, Sisa gets abused by two Guardia Civils.

==== Scene 2 - A part of the woods near the lake ====
Young people of San Diego were happily having a picnic by the shores of a lake to celebrate the return of Ibarra. During the celebrations a crocodile was spotted by the fishermen. The news caused panic among the people. Elias attempted to drive away the crocodile but is endangered. Ibarra saves him and kills the crocodile. Elias thanks Ibarra for saving him and he also warned him to be careful of his enemies. During the picnic Sisa wandered around, lamenting and finding her lost children.

While Ibarra elaborates on his plans to build a schoolhouse, Padre Damaso joins the scene and ridicules Ibarra's plans. Ibarra, greatly enraged, grabbed a knife, and approached the priest. The interference of Maria Clara and other guests stopped Ibarra from doing further injuries to the priest.

=== Act 3 ===
==== Scene 1 - Maria Clara's bedroom ====
Maria Clara is seen in her bedroom depressed. The news of Ibarra getting excommunicated and banished from San Diego greatly saddened her. Tiya Isabel, Sinang and Andeng consoles her. Kapitan Tiyago enters and announced in a woeful tone about Padre Damaso's order to break the engagement between Ibarra and Maria Clara, and instead making her marry with a young Spaniard named Alfonso Linares. Ibarra meanwhile talked to the governor-general to clear his name. He went to Maria Clara's place and proposed marriage. The rejoicing of the couple is interrupted as the Alferez arrests Ibarra for allegedly inciting a rebellion. Maria Clara is in great despair and prays to the Virgin Mary for help.

==== Scene 2 - The same room ====
In her bedroom Maria Clara is worried for Ibarra's fate. Padre Damaso tries to console her. Maria Clara said if she was not able to marry Ibarra, she would either choose death or become a nun. Padre Damaso discourages her from becoming a nun, but as the firm determination of Maria Clara became apparent to him, Padre Damaso leaves her, feeling abjectly defeated and wounded to the core as he resigns his will to the inescapable ways of God.

Elias and Ibarra has just escaped from prison, and they visited Maria Clara through a window. They said their final goodbyes and Ibarra and Elias escapes through the window. 2 gunshots were heard at the end of the scene.

==== Scene 3 - Another part of the woods near an old graveyard ====
Sisa is seen wandering in the forest. She has already lost her mind and still hopelessly finding her lost children. Basilio, injured, enters and finds and calls her mother. Because of her insanity, she didn't notice him. Basilio attempts to chase her mother until he became very tired. Sisa found the exhausted Basilio, and she immediately recognized him. The shock and overflowing joy is too much for her heart and she finally expires. Elias, mortally wounded, enters. He instructs Basilio to build a pyre to burn his (Elias) body and her mother to ashes. He also instructed him to dig the riches and jewelry buried nearby to use it for his studies. Elias lamented that he wouldn't see the light of tomorrow. The opera ends with Basilio gathering firewood and burning the two corpses.

== Sources ==
- De Leon, F. P. (1978). "Manila welcomes the opera". In Filipino heritage: the making of a nation (Vol. 9, pp. 2340–46). Lahing Pilipino Publishing.
