= Barredos =

Barredos Los Barreros (Asturian)
- Parish
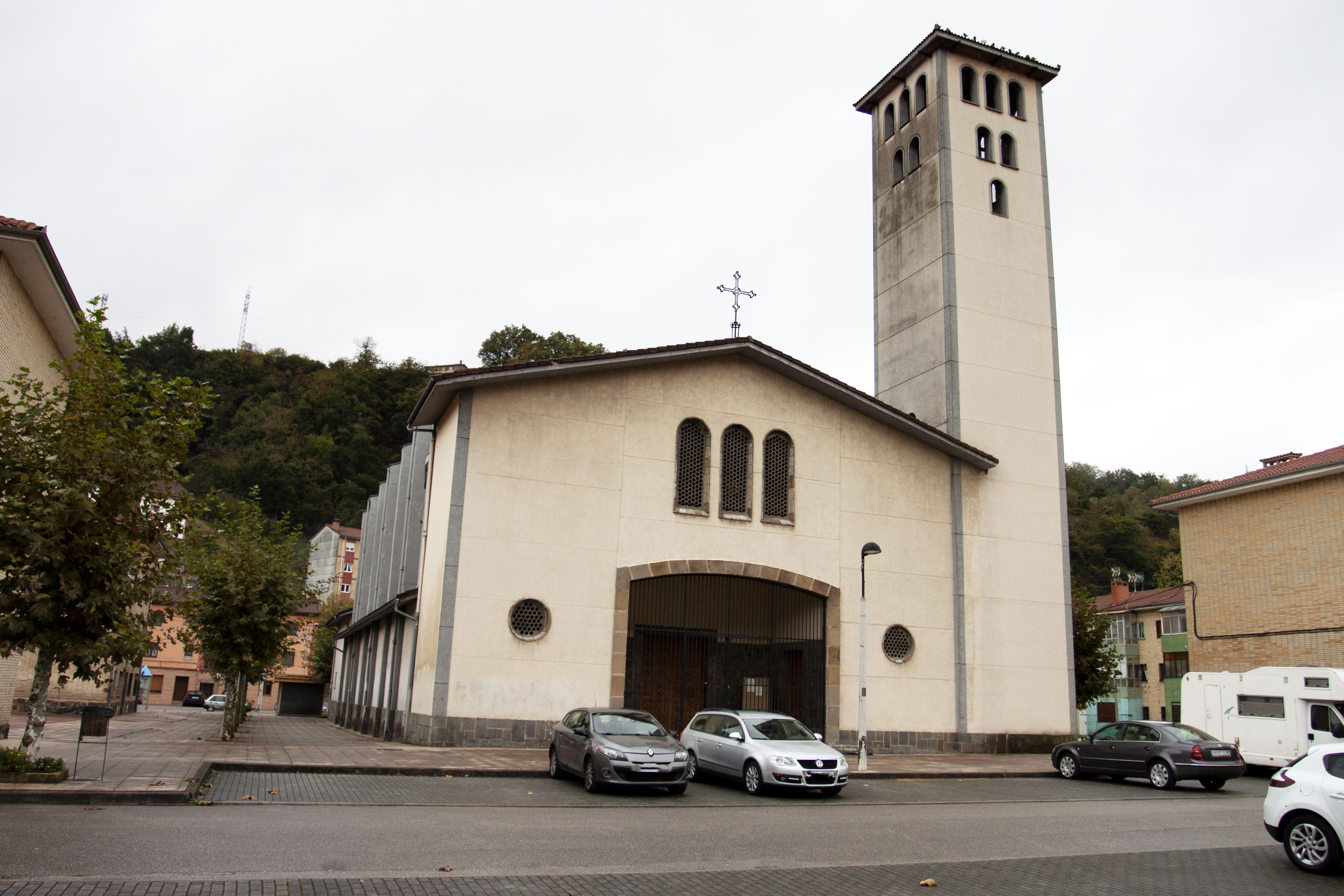
- Barredos parish church of San José Obrero

- Location within Spain
- Country: Spain
- Autonomous community: Asturias
- Municipality: Laviana

Population
  - Total: 1,400

Barredos (Asturian: Los Barreros) is a place in the parish of Tiraña in Laviana, a municipality within the province and autonomous community of Asturias, in northern Spain. The population is 1,677 people.

== Location ==
Barredos is 2 kilometers from the district capital, Pola de Laviana. It lies at 31 kilometers from Oviedo and 38 kilometers from Gijón.

== History ==
The urban town was born as a mining town after the rise of coal mining in this part of the Nalón Mining Basin. In the 1950s it grew considerably with the construction of the First of May working-class neighborhood, a place of residence for many of the workers of the Carrio pit mine. In the center of the neighborhood, the church of San José Obrero was built, with a bell tower that stands out above the rooftops. The Avenida del Principado divides the town into two parts: the neighborhood with the church and the old town. The Tiraña river, a tributary of the Nalón, crosses the town. Some mining trails run through old coal mining sites. Next to one of them is the Rimoria suspension bridge, built by Duro Felguera, with a profile similar to the Vizcaya Bridge but much smaller.

== Services ==
Barredos has a primary school, a municipal sports center, and a stop for FEVE on the Laviana-Gijón line. It also has regular bus service to the rest of the Nalón, Oviedo and Gijón Valleys.
