= 815 Coppelia =

Minor planet in the Solar System

Discovery
- Discovered by: Max Wolf
- Discovery site: Heidelberg Observatory
- Discovery date: 2 February 1916

Designations
- Alternative designations: 1916 YU

Orbital characteristics
- Epoch 31 July 2016 (JD 2457600.5)
- Uncertainty parameter 0
- Observation arc: 100.20 yr (36597 d)
- Aphelion: 2.8615 AU (428.07 Gm)
- Perihelion: 2.4570 AU (367.56 Gm)
- Semi-major axis: 2.6593 AU (397.83 Gm)
- Eccentricity: 0.076056
- Orbital period (sidereal): 4.34 yr (1583.9 d)
- Mean anomaly: 74.8031°
- Mean motion: 0° 13^{m} 38.208^{s} / day
- Inclination: 13.864°
- Longitude of ascending node: 57.066°
- Argument of perihelion: 59.329°
- Earth MOID: 1.50119 AU (224.575 Gm)
- Jupiter MOID: 2.32242 AU (347.429 Gm)
- T_{Jupiter}: 3.341

Physical characteristics
- Mean radius: 10.55 km
- Synodic rotation period: 4.421 h (0.1842 d)
- Geometric albedo: 0.2089±0.053
- Absolute magnitude (H): 10.7

815 Coppelia is a minor planet orbiting the Sun that was discovered by German astronomer Max Wolf on 2 February 1916 from Heidelberg named after Coppélia, a comic ballet.

Photometric observations of this asteroid at the Rozhen Observatory in Bulgaria during 2010 gave a light curve with a period of 4.4565 hours and a brightness variation of 0.24 in magnitude. This is consistent with a period of 4.421 hours and an amplitude of 0.27 obtained during a 2006 study.
