= Maniya Barredo =

Filipina prima ballerina (born 1951)

- Born: Josephine Carmen Imutan Barredo; November 19, 1951 (age 74); Manila, Philippines
- Occupation: Ballet dancer
- Years active: 1955–present
- Relatives: Baby Barredo (aunt); Lea Salonga (cousin); Gerard Salonga (cousin)

Josephine Carmen Imutan Barredo (born November 19, 1951), known professionally as Maniya Barredo, is a Filipina ballet dancer and instructor. She is best known as the first and only Prima ballerina of the Philippines, an honor that was declared in 1978.

She performed for the Joffrey Ballet, Atlanta Ballet, and the Les Grands Ballets Canadiens. She has taught at the Mount Dora School of Ballet and is the Founder and Director of Metropolitan Ballet Theatre. She has been described as the “technical trump card” of the Hariraya Ballet Company. In 1977, she was selected by Alicia Alonzo to represent the company in Cuba for the international festival. In Manila in 1977, she performed with Burton Taylor. She received a greeting on the occasion of her 50th anniversary in the dance profession from the President of the Philippines, Benigno S. Aquino III for her “enrichment of the Philippine arts” and the Gawad CCP Para Sining (Sayaw) Award of Excellence in 1992. She was invited to tour with the Stars of the World Ballet. Among others she has trained: Colette Tilinski, Luis Gonzalez, and Sarah Cordia.

== Life and career ==
=== Early childhood and education ===
Josephine Carmen Imutan Barredo was born in Manila, Philippines as the fourth child of Eugenio and Grizelda Barredo. Barredo's father owned the Mabar Trucking Company. Her mother was a former dancer who married at fifteen and had nine children. Barredo credits her mother with influencing her decision to pursue dancing as a career.

Barredo began dancing at four years old, and later took ballet lessons with her aunt, Julie Borromeo. Borromeo was one of Manila's most famous ballet dancers. By the age of nine, Barredo had her own children's TV show, which helped support the education of her siblings.

=== Ballet career ===
At eighteen, Barredo left the Philippines to travel to New York where she pursued a ballet career with the Joffrey Ballet on scholarship. Upon arriving, Barredo faced scrutiny from the director of the school, Robert Joffrey. Having noticed that her weight had increased, Joffrey insulted Barredo, telling her that she should pursue a nursing career instead of ballet like "most Filipino women" did. After a year of hard work, Barredo succeeded in proving Joffrey wrong and later received positive recognition in the form of a changed name. According to Barredo, Joffrey renamed the dancers in whom he saw potential. Thus, Barredo was given the name of "Manila" after the capital city of the Philippines. Barredo remained with the Joffrey School until receiving an offer to dance with the Les Grands Ballets Canadiens.

In 1976, her career with Les Grands Ballets Canadiens climaxed. Renowned Cuban Prima Ballerina, Alicia Alonso, specially chose Barredo to perform on behalf of Canada at Cuba's International Ballet Festival. After this distinction, Barredo continued to dance. She danced multiple times with the famous Mikhail Baryshnikov, toured with the Stars of the World Ballet upon special invitation, and performed the role of Giselle at the Cultural Center of the Philippines Competition in 1978. After this performance, Barredo was honored with the Gawad CCP Para Sining Award of Excellence given to her by the Philippine President. Because of this, the renowned ballerina, Dame Margot Fonteyn, gave Barredo the distinction of Prima Ballerina. Barredo then continued to dance as the Philippine Ballet Theater's Prima Ballerina. After this career, Barredo returned to the United States to take the position of Prima Ballerina for the Atlanta Ballet where she would dance for twenty years before retiring.

=== Later life ===
After retiring from the Atlanta Ballet, Barredo pursued a teaching career where she became the artistic consultant to Atlanta's Ballethnic and the Cultural Attache for the Philippines. In 1998, Barredo founded her own ballet school and assumed the larger role of artistic director for Metropolitan Ballet Theatre based in Atlanta, Georgia in 1998.
