= Monique Wilson =

Filipina singer, actress, and activist (born 1970)

- Born: Monica Anne Esteva Wilson; May 4, 1970 (age 54); Makati, Rizal, Philippines
- Education: University of the Philippines Diliman; London Academy of Music and Dramatic Art
- Occupation(s): Singer, actress
- Spouse: Rossana Abueva (m. 2015)

Monica Anne Esteva Wilson (born May 4, 1970), usually credited as Monique Wilson, is a Filipina singer, actress, and women's rights activist. She began her professional career at the age of nine. At 18, she gained recognition as the understudy for the lead role of Kim in the original London West End production of Miss Saigon, later starring in the role.

== Performing career ==
Wilson began her professional career in 1980, at age 9, with Repertory Philippines as an orphan in the musical Annie. Over the succeeding seasons, she performed roles in many other musicals. At the age of 14, she starred at the musical Evita. In 1988, at the age of 18, she auditioned for a role in Miss Saigon in the original West End production and was cast as the understudy of the title role, Kim. After a year, she replaced Lea Salonga in the role. She later earned a BA in Theatre from the University of the Philippines in Diliman and studied at the London Academy of Dramatic Arts (LAMDA), receiving its postgraduate certificate in classical acting.

In 1994, she returned to the Philippines and founded the New Voice Company, for whom she played leading roles and serves as Artistic Director. The company has continued to produce theatre works in several Asian countries and has been active in the women's rights movement, producing and performing in such works as The Vagina Monologues. She also began directing plays and musicals and continued acting and recording music. She later pursued masters studies in Applied Drama and Theater Education at the Central School of Speech and Drama in London, graduating in 2003. She has continued her acting and music recording careers, splitting her time between Manila and London. Her films include Bad Boy 2 (1992), for which she received a nomination for the Best Newcomer in Film award at the Star Awards, Kapag Iginuhit Ang Hatol Ng Puso (1992) for which she won Best Supporting Actress Award in the Film Academy of the Philippines (now called LUNA), Ikaw (1993) and SA Isang Sulok Ng Mga Pangarap (1993). In 1998, she portrayed Maria Clara in José Rizal and was nominated as Best Supporting Actress in the Metro Manila Film Festival. For the 2001 film Laro sa Baga, she won the Best Supporting Actress at the URIAN.

Wilson's recordings include her 1994 self-titled debut album (Viva Records) and a 1998 album titled Monique Sings Gershwin, with Japanese producer Musicscape.

From 2009 to 2014, Wilson was the head of the MA/MFA Acting International course for the East 15 Acting School of the University of Essex.

== Activism ==
In 1999, the Philippine women's group GABRIELA invited Wilson to become the international spokesperson for their Purple Rose Campaign, a campaign to end the sex trafficking of Filipina women and girls. In 2001, together with New Voice Company executive producer Rossana Abueva, Wilson began to produce V-Day events in the Philippines.

Since 2013, Wilson has been the director of One Billion Rising.

== Personal life ==
Wilson was born in Makati, Philippines, to Johnny Wilson, the vice Mayor of Makati, and Teresa Esteva. She has a brother named Jamie Wilson who is also a stage musical actor. Her parents have both been involved in the entertainment industry. She married Rossana Abueva in London in 2015.
