= Felipe Padilla de Leon =

Filipino composer and conductor

Felipe Padilla de León
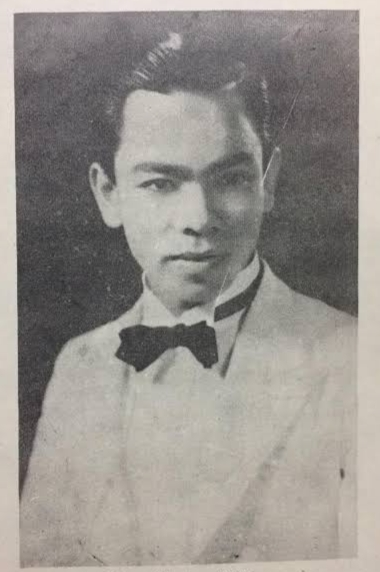
- De Leon during his studies in the University of the Philippines, c. 1936
- Born: Felipe de León y Padilla; 1 May 1912; Sittio Papaya, then part of Peñaranda, Nueva Ecija, Philippine Islands (now General Tinio, Nueva Ecija)
- Died: 5 December 1992 (aged 80); Manila, Philippines
- Resting place: Loyola Memorial Park Marikina, Philippines
- Occupations: Composer and conductor
- Awards: Order of National Artists of the Philippines
- Musical career
- Genres: Classical; orchestra
- Instruments: Trombone; horn; piano

Felipe Padilla de León (May 1, 1912 – December 5, 1992) was a Filipino music composer, conductor, and scholar. He was known for composing different sonatas, marches and concertos that reflect the Filipino identity.

De Leon was also recognized as a composer who experienced different regime change throughout the course of his lifetime. From the Commonwealth period up to the presidency of Ferdinand Marcos, his music became a representation of Filipino ideals and aspirations throughout the ages of Philippine history.

== Early life and career ==
De Leon was a native of Sitio Papaya, Peñaranda (now General Tinio), Nueva Ecija, the third of four children by the second marriage of his mother Natalia Padilla to Juan de Leon. His father died when he was three years old, leaving his mother to raise him and his elder half-brother, Pedro P. San Diego. Before becoming a musician, he took various odd jobs to support his family, such as a shoe polisher, carabao herder, carriage driver, and vendor of various items. In 1927, he took up Fine Arts at the University of the Philippines, but he had to abandon his studies to make a living. He played the trombone in cabarets and circuses, and later worked as an assistant conductor of the Nueva Ecija High School Orchestra, where he started composing music. To improve his composing skills he again enrolled to the University of the Philippines, and graduated in 1939 with a diploma of music teacher and conductor. Much later, he continued his studies under Vittorio Giannini at the Juilliard School in New York, U.S.

De Leon married pianist Iluminada Mendoza with whom he had six children, including Bayani, a prominent composer, and Felipe Jr., a writer.

== Promotion of Filipino nationalism ==
=== Commonwealth period ===
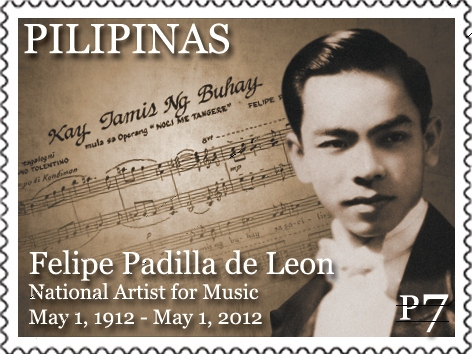
Felipe Padilla de Leon on a 2012 stamp of the Philippines

During the 1930s, there was a massive cultural movement of "Filipinism" among several Filipino artists. The reason for the movement was to promote nationalism to Filipinos and as a response to the cultural integration imposed by the United States.

Even though American stewardship was a lopsided deal, particularly the political and economic components at recognizing Philippine independence, the reactions were quite extensive in the cultural aspect. The need to define what is “Filipino” bloomed and inspired a call for action from the artists.

— Renato B. Lucas

Raul Navarro, a professor at the UP College of Music, also pointed out that music education (both primary and secondary) became a means of cultural homogenization and Americanization of Filipinos during those period.

Being affected by the said movement, De Leon, along with his fellow composer Lucio San Pedro, continued the nationalist tradition of Antonio Molina, Francisco Santiago, and Nicanor Abelardo by using the material from Filipino folk songs as the basis of their own created compositions. De Leon also wrote articles and publications highlighting the importance of music as an expression of nationalism.

Music is an important intellectual and sociological force and there is no other force which can socialize, energize and guide the emotions of masses from childhood to maturity than good music

— Felipe Padilla de Leon, The Philippine Collegian (September 1938)

=== Japanese occupation ===
During the outbreak of World War II, De Leon was forced to compose national music for the invading Japanese. His song, "Payapang Daigdig" was also composed during this time period right after the destruction of Manila.

After independence, De Leon soon composed the symphonic poems, "The Cry of Balintawak" and "Bataan" to commemorate the Filipinos who suffered under the Japanese occupation.

== Post-war era ==
De Leon was dubbed "composer of 1949" and was granted fellowship by then Philippine vice president Fernando Lopez. In exchange, De Leon composed for the vice president two symphonic poem during his stay at the Lopez estate in Iloilo, Philippines namely Roca Encantanda and Siete Pecados.

During the 1950s, he revised the Tagalog lyrics of the Philippine national anthem. From 1953 to 1982, he became president of Pambansang Samahan ng mga Banda sa Pilipinas (PASAMBAP) and served as founding president of the Filipino Society of Composers, Authors and Publishers (FILSCAP) from 1965 to 1985. In the mid-1960s, he served as the cultural affairs officer of Manila.

== Awards and honors ==
- Republic Cultural Heritage Award .
- Rizal Pro-Patria Award
- Presidential Award of Merit
- Patnubay ng Kalinangan Award
- Composer of the Year (1949)
- Musician of the Year (Manila, 1958)
- National Artist of the Philippines (1997)

== Selected works ==
=== Operas ===
- Noli Me Tangere (Touch Me Not), opera in 3 acts (1957)
- El Filibusterismo (Subversion), opera (1970)

=== Concertos ===
- Konzertstück for Violin and Orchestra (c. 1950s)
- Flute Concerto (1980)

=== Orchestral works ===
- Mariang Makiling Overture (1939)
- Roca Encantada, symphonic legend (1950)
- Maynila Overture (1976)
- Tatlong Tunog Larawan (Three Sound Portraits), for orchestra (1976)
- Orchesterstück (1981)
- Manila Sketches for Orchestra (1949)
- Bataan, tone poem (1947)
- Cry of Balintawak, tone poem (1948)
- Mga Katutubong Tanawin

=== Marches and other works for band ===
- "Awit sa Paglikha ng Bagong Pilipinas" (1942)
- "Awit ng Maynila" (Song of Manila) (1966)
- "Himno ng Marikina" (Marikina Hymn) (late 1960s)
- "Bagong Pagsilang" (New Birth) (1973)
- Tayo’y Magtanim (Let Us Plant) (1970s)
- Ang Karomata (The Carriage)
- Tindig, Aking Inang Bayan (Rise Up, My Motherland)
- Fantasy for Trombone and Band
- Mayumi Theme and Variations
- Awit ng Serbisyo Sibil (Civil Service Hymn)
- Philippine Constabulary March

=== Chamber ===
- Fantasy for four flutes and percussion

== Songs ==
- "Noche Buena" (1965)
- "Pasko Na Naman" (1965)

== See also ==
- Diwa de Leon, Felipe's grandson composer
