= Alice Reyes =

Filipina dancer and teacher (born 1942)

Alice Garcia Reyes
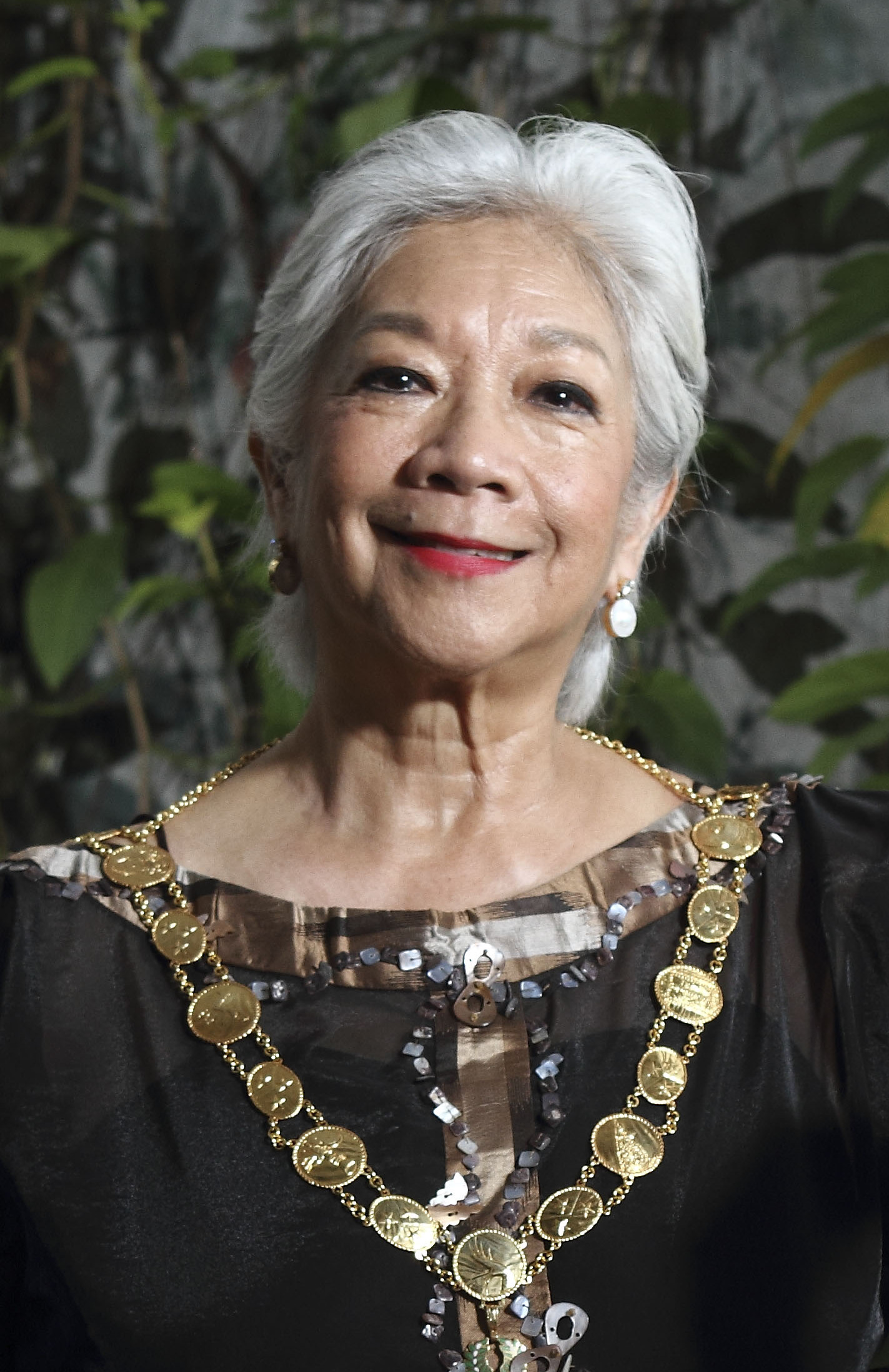
- Alice Reyes in 2016
- Born: Alice Garcia Reyes; October 14, 1942 (age 83); Manila, Philippines
- Citizenship: Philippines; United States
- Occupations: Filipino choreographer, dancer, teacher, director, producer
- Years active: 1969–1989
- Spouses: Dick Upton (divorced) Ted van Doorn (m. 1982)
- Parent(s): Ricardo Reyes; Adoracion Garcia
- Awards: Order of National Artists of the Philippines

Alice Garcia Reyes (born October 14, 1942) is a Filipina dancer, choreographer, teacher, director and producer. The founder (together with Eddie Elejar) of Ballet Philippines, she received since June 20, 2014 from the Philippine President Benigno Aquino III as a recipient of the National Artist designation for Dance. She played a significant role in the development of contemporary dance in the Philippines with the Alice Reyes Dance Company, which staged the first modern dance concert at the Cultural Center of the Philippines Main Theater in February 1970. It was this company that later became Ballet Philippines. She is best known for "Bungkos Suite", "Carmen", "Carmina Burana", "Romeo and Juliet", "Rama Hari", "Cinderella", "Amada", "Itim-Asu", and "Tales of the Manuvu"—all incorporating elements of Filipino culture.

== Early life and education ==
Reyes was born on October 14, 1942. At a very young age, Reyes took up lessons in classical ballet under Rosalia Merino while studying at Maryknoll College where she completed a Bachelor of Arts degree in History and Foreign Services.

Soon after, she took post-graduate studies at Ateneo de Manila University. She further trained under the guidance of Leonor Orosa Goquingco and Ricardo Casell of the Philippine Women's University (PWU).

In addition, she took up folk dance at the Bayanihan Philippine National Folk Dance Company. Thinking of deepening her professional studies, she went to America and enrolled in formal courses in modern dance and jazz.

In New York, she took the opportunity to take more formal studies at Sarah Lawrence College in Westchester County, New York.

== First marriage and divorce ==
Reyes was once married to Dick Upton, the current treasurer of Ballet Philippines, but they got separated in 1982. Upton later came out as gay and married his partner Elmer.

== Retirement ==
Reyes retired from Ballet Philippines in 1985 but still served as its artistic director until 1989. Her decision was motivated mainly by her desire to live with her second husband Ted Van Doorn and their family in California. She started using her married name, Alicia Van Doorn when credited for her artistic efforts during this time. She resumed using her maiden name after officially becoming a National Artist.

After Reyes left, Ballet Philippines went through a string of artistic directors, most notably Paul Alexander Morales, who served for more than 8 years, and Alan Hineline, a choreographer and dancer who was born in Franklin, Ohio but is now based in New York. Hineline also served as chief operating officer of Ballet Philippines, overseeing a complete rebranding of the organization.

== Return to Ballet Philippines ==
In 2017, Reyes was brought back on as the artistic director of Ballet Philippines (BP), just in time for the company’s 50th year anniversary. Her permanent residence was still in the US so she flew in and out of the Philippines for her occupation as artistic director.

== BP exit and controversy ==
On February 6, 2020 the board of trustees of BP concluded a months-long search for a new artistic director and decided to go with renowned Russian ballet dancer Mikhail "Misha" Martynyuk. He was favored by the BP board over a handful of other candidates, including two who were personally endorsed by Reyes herself. These were Adam Sage, an American who had danced with BP in the late 1970's and came back as associate artistic director in 2017, and Ronelson Yadao, a dancer and choreographer who was being groomed by Reyes as the next associate artistic director for Sage. The two were not able to make it on the day of their interviews with BP for the artistic director position because of prior commitments and were denied to reschedule.

Reyes learned of Martynyuk's appointment after the BP board issued a circular and shared Martynyuk's credentials on an internal bulletin board. At this time, Reyes wrote to the board, congratulating the search committee on their decision. She added that she was looking forward to meeting her successor.

As news of Martynyuk's appointment and Reyes's subsequent replacement came out, along with the notion that it caught her off guard, various individuals expressed disapproval online and called for the appointment to be revoked. Reyes insists that she does not personally use social media so all views related to the topic expressed online have only been relayed to her through other mediums.

Reyes is scheduled to officially step down from her post as artistic director on March 31, 2020. This is a month earlier than the expiration date of the contract that she originally signed when she returned to the role back in 2018.

== Aftermath ==
Although Reyes had agreed to leave her artistic director post in April 2020 years prior, she has expressed disappointment at the turn of events that saw the introduction of a new artistic director before her departure.

== The CCP Professional Artist Support Program ==
When the pandemic hit in 2020, National Artist for Dance Alice Reyes was preparing for the restaging of “Rama, Hari” in March when the lockdown was enforced. Reyes recalled: “The pandemic came to us as total shock, dismay, disbelief, and life disruption in all ways, as it was for everyone else!”

With the help of friends and supporters of the arts and dance, I went into fundraising mode, launched the Adopt-a-Dancer campaign to try and keep as many of the displaced dancers training, dancing, creating, and earning, to pay rent and utilities, and to buy food.”

The CCP, with then president Nick Lizaso and Margie Moran Floirendo, spearheaded the Professional Dance Support Program which gave grants to displaced dancers. They were also able to set up a dance floor in the main lobby, where the doors fronting Roxas Boulevard could be kept open.

Continued Reyes: “We were able to hold classes, do lecture demonstrations, and make short videos for dance students and dance enthusiasts that we posted on social media. We also worked on new choreographies, which were then streamed online by the CCP to all the regions in the country and beyond.”

Protocol was put in place, and only so many dancers could be in the class at any given time. Temperatures were taken, masks required, distances kept, and constant disinfecting, sanitizing of floors, barres and furniture done at regular intervals.

Things got worse when the CCP ordered total closure of all its venues. “I brought the dancers to my home, turned two bedrooms into dance studios, and we went on via Zoom, doing ballet and modern dance classes. Our young choreographers worked from their homes with their dancers at different locations. That was something to witness! It’s proof of the saying if there is a will, there will indeed be a way. New works that were produced under such conditions were put online by the CCP as a series of dance shows called Dance On!”

Reyes had to keep dancers busy even after dance hours. She gave her four resident dancers recipes to whip up, such as Greek pastitsio, lasagna, and all kinds of fancy pasta sauces, along with appetizers and sauces and desserts. Soon the dancers-turned-cooks were doing Eggs Benedict Brunches on Sundays out on her patio. “Friends and other dancers lined up to sit at the three communal tables, chairs at proper distances.”

More pandemic thoughts: “the work kept me busy, surrounded by all their energy. We took all precautions and we stayed healthy and active, though totally aware of the many lives lost, the many jobs gone, and businesses closing down.”

When the CCP opened its doors two years later (only to close again for a three-year renovation), her group was able to continue with an expanded Professional Artists Support Program (PASP) designed to give grants to displaced dancers from all professional dance companies.

They worked with dancers from the Philippine Ballet Theater, Ballet Manila, and Steps Dance Center. “We created full dance productions at the end of each six-month program. We added a new regional outreach program that brought in dancers from the different regions of the country. We were able to invite teachers and choreographers from all around Metro Manila. They gave lectures, choreographed, and coached dance teachers and students from all over the islands.

== Alice Reyes Dance Philippines ==
Alice Reyes Dance Philippines (ARDP) is a dance company founded by Reyes. Founded by National Artist for Dance, Alice Reyes, the company focuses on dance education, mentoring, and creating new generations of Filipino dancers and choreographers, as well as presenting works by National Artists and notable Filipino choreographers spanning from 1969 to the present.

The company presented educational and production projects to the Cultural Center of the Philippines and collaborated with the CCP Arts Education Department. This resulted in over 2,500 classes taught and more than 40 extensive educational materials on the field of dance covering Classical Ballet, Modern and Contemporary Dance, Jazz, and Hip Hop.

A part of the CCP’s Professional Artist Support Program (PASP), the company, along with regional participants under their tutelage, created educational content and new choreographic works, including Erl Sorilla’s “Ghostlight” (2020), Ronelson Yadao’s “Ang Kabaligtaran ng Gunaw” (2021), “Tuloy ang Pasko” (2020) in collaboration with National Artist for Music Ryan Cayabyab, and “Visayan Suite of Dances” (2022) with a grant from the National Commission for Culture and the Arts.

In 2022, ARDP and the PASP have partnered to present PULSO PILIPINAS I, together with guest artists from the regions, and three other productions: PULSO PILIPINAS II: ALAY nina ALICE at AGNES, PREMIERES AND ENCORES and PUSO NG PASKO.

In 2023, ARDP continued its dance education and production programs.

ARDP opened 2024 with a rerun of Alice Reyes’ RAMA, HARI. The production will also have a National Tour with performances in Dumaguete and Bacolod. The company also premieres a brand new work for Children’s Theater, Erl Sorilla’s MGA KWENTO NI JUAN TAMAD and caps off the year with a National Tour of ARDP’s acclaimed Filipino Christmas Classic, PUSO NG PASKO.

== Major works ==
{https://ncca.gov.ph/about-culture-and-arts/culture-profile/national-artists-of-the-philippines/alice-reyes/}

- Amada (1969)
- At a Maranaw Gathering (1970)
- Itim-Asu (1971)
- Tales of the Manuvu (1977)
- Rama Hari (1980)
- Bayanihan Remembered (1987)
