= Ballet Philippines =

Arts center in Metro Manila, Philippines

General information
- Name: Ballet Philippines
- Previous names: Cultural Center of the Philippines Dance Company
- Year founded: 1969
- Founder: Alice Reyes
- Principal venue: Tanghalang Pambansa; Cultural Center of the Philippines; Manila, Philippines
- Website: www.ballet.ph

Artistic staff
- Artistic director: Alice Reyes

Other
- Official school: CCP Dance School

Ballet Philippines (BP) is a ballet company in the Philippines founded in 1969 by Alice Reyes with the support of Eddie Elejar and the Cultural Center of the Philippines. Proficient in both ballet and modern dance, the company synthesizes diverse dance and movement forms into distinctively Filipino contemporary expressions. These include classical ballet, avant-garde choreography, traditional and modern dance, martial arts, and aerial movements.

As the resident dance company of the Cultural Center of the Philippines, Ballet Philippines is described as the country's flagship company in ballet and contemporary dance. The company has been praised for its dance foundation, flexibility of style, and sense of theater.

Each year, outreach and educational programs introduce audiences to dance, music, and visual art. BP's official school is the CCP Dance School.

With over 400 works, Ballet Philippines' repertory is unparalleled in Asia, from full-length classical ballets and internationally recognized masterworks to indigenous works of Filipino folklore and social issues.

== History ==
American colonization paved the way for the introduction of ballet in the Philippines. In 1915, distinguished ballet dancer Paul Nijinsky performed classical ballet at the Manila Hotel Roof Garden (Dimalanta, 2006).

In 1927, Luva Adameit came to the Philippines and started a ballet school. She trained the first few ballet dancers in the country. Her dancers, sur les pointes, were inspired by local dances like the Planting Rice, Carinosa, and the Maria Clara that eventually influenced Leonor Orosa Goquingco.

From then on, ballet has thrived in the country and invited a number of foreign teachers and performers as well. It paved the way to "a receptive outlook towards the artistic values of the art form" (Alejandro, 1983). The institution that eventually became Ballet Philippines was first conceived in 1969, with the opening of the Cultural Center of the Philippines (CCP). It was initially conceived by dancer-choreographers Alice Reyes (now a National Artist of the Philippines for dance), Eddie Elejar, and Tony Fabella as the CCP Summer Dance Workshop. This later evolved into CCP Dance Company, which eventually became Ballet Philippines.

In February 1970, the Alice Reyes Modern Dance Company premiered its debut performance at the Cultural Center of the Philippines. Its original members included dancers from the Bayanihan Dance Company, U.E. Dance Troupe and Dance Theater Philippines. In April of that year, recognizing the available time and space at the CCP as well as the need to train more dancers, the company introduced the first CCP Summer Dance Workshop which would eventually be held annually, training two to four hundred students each year in classical and modern dance. That same year, the CCP Dance Workshop and Company was launched with Alice Reyes and Eddie Elejar as artistic directors.

== Artistic directors ==
- Alice Reyes, National Artist for Dance (1969–1989)
- Denisa Reyes (1991–1994/2000-2004)
- Agnes Locsin (1995–1996/1999-2000)
- Cecile Sicangco (1996–1999)
- Noordin Jumalon (1999–2000)
- Alden Lugnasin (2004)
- Agustus "Bam" Damian III (2004–2008)
- Alan Hineline and Max Luna III (2008–2009)
- Paul Alexander Morales (2009–2017)
- Alice Reyes (2017-2020)
- Mikhail "Misha" Martynyuk (2020-Present)

== Notable alumni ==
- Candice Adea
- Jean Marc Cordero
- Nonoy Froilan, National Artist for Dance

== See also ==
- Georgette Sanchez
- Eduardo Sicangco
