= Repertory Philippines =

Arts center in Metro Manila, Philippines

- Formation: March 1967; 59 years ago
- Founders: Zenaida Amador; Carmen Barredo; Leo Martinez; Tony Mercado; Monina Mercado
- Type: Private
- Headquarters: Makati, Metro Manila, Philippines
- Location: Carlos P. Romulo Auditorium, RCBC Plaza, Makati
- Services: Play and musical performances, performing arts workshops
- Chairman, President and CEO: Mindy Perez-Rubio
- Website: repertoryphilippines.ph

Repertory Philippines Foundation Inc. (REP) is a Filipino theater company dedicated to showcasing English-language productions.

== History ==
Repertory Philippines was established in March 1967 by five actors: Zenaida Amador, Carmen Barredo, Leo Martinez, Tony Mercado, and Monina Mercado. Its first production was a Tagalog-language adaptation of Miss Julie by August Strindberg, directed by Rolando Tinio. In its early years, REP experienced difficulty in attracting audiences for its plays; the owners assessed that the paying audience preferred plays in English and those authored by American and European playwrights. REP's debut play Miss Julie had poor viewership which led the theater company to focus on English-language plays. With the patronage of Jaime Zobel de Ayala, the viewership of REP's plays gradually increased. Most of the theater group's productions were derived from classic English-language plays and Broadway musicals.

In 1988, REP-trained actors including Lea Salonga and Monique Wilson were selected to join the original West End company of Cameron Mackintosh's Miss Saigon.

== Venues ==
Since 2024, Repertory Philippines' home venue is the Carlos P. Romulo Auditorium in RCBC Plaza, Makati, while a new venue at Eastwood Citywalk in Eastwood City, Quezon City is slated to open in October. Prior to that period, REP did productions at the Insular Life Auditorium in Makati (1967–1992), the William Shaw Theater at Shangri-La Plaza, Mandaluyong (1992–2002), and the OnStage Theater at Greenbelt 1, Makati (2002–2024). The theater group also did plays at the Cultural Center of the Philippines, the Meralco Theater, and the now-defunct Rizal Theater in Makati.

== Reputation ==
Repertory Philippines is known for producing plays in English – a subject of criticism by Filipino nationalists, although the theater company has a policy of not hiring foreign actors for the lead roles in their plays.

== See also ==
- Philippine Educational Theater Association
