= Culture of the Philippines =

The culture of the Philippines is characterized by great ethnic diversity. Although the multiple ethnic groups of the Philippine archipelago have only recently established a shared Filipino national identity, their cultures were all shaped by the geography and history of the region, and by centuries of interaction with neighboring cultures, and colonial powers. In more recent times, Filipino culture has also been influenced through its participation in the global community.

== History ==
Among the contemporary ethnic groups of the Philippine archipelago, the Negritos are generally considered the earliest settlers; today, although few in numbers, they preserve a very traditional way of life and culture. After those early settlers, the Austronesians arrived on the archipelago. The Austronesian culture is strongly evident in the ethnic majority and languages.

Before the arrival of European colonizers in the 1500s, the various ethnic groups of the Philippines were organized into various independent polities, which historians have come to call "barangays". (Note: The actual historical use of the term "barangay" and its applicability to polities throughout the archipelago has been questioned in recent scholarship.) These polities consisted of about thirty to a hundred households, and were ruled by leaders with titles. The largest of these, such as Butuan, Tondo and the Sultanate of Sulu were complex political formations based on the deltas of the archipelago's biggest river systems, with political and trade relationships with polities further upstream on one hand, and with the political and trading powers of Maritime Southeast Asia and East Asia such as the Sultanate of Brunei, the Majapahit empire, the Qing and Ming Dynasties of China, and even Japan. Indirect cultural exchange and some trade also took place with the Indian subcontinent and Arabia.

The advent of Spanish colonial rule in the islands marked the beginning of the Philippines as an entity, a collection of Southeast Asian countries united under the Spanish Empire. The empire ruled, via the Viceroyalty of New Spain and later directly from Madrid (after 1821 Mexican independence), the islands between the 16th and 19th centuries (Batanes being one of the last places to be colonized in the mid-1800s), resulting in Christianity spreading and dominating throughout the archipelago and influencing the religion and beliefs of the natives. Then, the Philippines became a U.S. territory for almost 50 years. Influence from the United States is manifested in the wide use of the English language, media and in the modern culture and clothing of present-day Philippines.

== Geography and ethnic groups ==
Dominant ethnic groups by province

The Philippines' culture is shaped by its archipelagic geography, topography and physical location within Maritime Southeast Asia, all of which defined the cultural histories of the country's 175 Ethnolinguistic groups.

=== Influence of geography ===
The cultural diversity of the Philippines is the result of the country's archipelagic nature. The Philippines, as the world's fifth largest island country, is one of the five original archipelagic states recognized under the United Nations Convention on the Law of the Sea (UNCLOS). Its 7,641 islands (Note: The count of islands was pegged at 7,107 in 1945, and was updated to 7,641 in 2017 after the Philippine National Mapping and Resource Information Authority (NAMRIA) announced that it had identified 400 to 500 additional land features that might be considered islands.) have a total land area of 300,000 square kilometers (115,831 sq mi); its exclusive economic zone—covering an area 200 nautical miles (370 km) from its islands' shores—encompasses 2,263,816 square kilometers (874,064 sq mi) of sea. Maritime and river transport allowed cultural exchanges between the country's diverse ethnic groups who settled on various islands within the archipelago; inland mountain ranges, on the other hand, were a major hindrance to cultural linkages between various groups.

=== Ethnic groups of the Philippines ===
The Philippines is inhabited by more than 182 ethnolinguistic groups, many of which are classified as "Indigenous Peoples" under the country's Indigenous Peoples' Rights Act of 1997. Traditionally-Muslim peoples from the southernmost island group of Mindanao are usually categorized together as Moro peoples, whether they are classified as Indigenous peoples or not. About 142 are classified as non-Muslim Indigenous People groups, and about 19 ethnolinguistic groups are classified as neither indigenous nor moro. Various migrant groups have also had a significant presence throughout the country's history.

The Muslim-majority ethnic groups ethnolinguistic groups of Mindanao, Sulu, and Palawan are collectively referred to as the Moro people, a broad category which includes some indigenous people groups and some non-indigenous people groups.

About 142 of the Philippines' Indigenous People groups are not classified as moro peoples. Some of these people groups are commonly grouped together due to their strongly association with a shared geographic area, although these broad categorizations are not always welcomed by the ethnic groups themselves. For example, the indigenous peoples of the Cordillera Mountain Range in northern Luzon have often been referred to using the exonym "Igorot people," and as the Cordilleran peoples. Meanwhile, the non-Moro peoples of Mindanao are collectively referred to as the Lumad, a collective autonym conceived in 1986 as a way to distinguish them from their neighboring indigenous Moro neighbors.

About 86 to 87 percent of the Philippine population belong to the 19 ethnolinguistic groups are classified as neither indigenous nor moro. known simply as Filipinos, these groups are sometimes collectively referred to as "Lowland Christianized groups" to distinguish them from the other ethnolinguistic groups. The most populous of these groups, with populations exceeding a million individuals, are the Ilocano, the Pangasinense, the Kapampangan, the Tagalog, the Ivatan, the Cuyonon, the Bicolano, the Visayans (Cebuanos, Boholano, the Hiligaynon/Ilonggo, and Waray) and many more. These groups converted to Christianity and was part of the Spanish empire, particularly both the native and migrant lowland-coastal groups, and adopted foreign elements of culture throughout the country's history.

Due to the history of the Philippines since the Spanish colonial era, there are also some historical migrant heritage groups within the lowland Filipino populations such as the Chinese Filipinos and Spanish Filipinos, both of whom intermixed with the above lowland Austronesian-speaking ethnic groups, which produced Filipino Mestizos. These groups also comprise and contribute a considerable proportion of the country's population, especially its bourgeois, and economy and were integral to the establishment of the country, from the rise of Filipino nationalism by the Ilustrado intelligentsia to the Philippine Revolution. Other peoples of migrant and/or mixed descent include those such as, American Filipinos, Indian Filipinos, Japanese Filipinos, and many more.

==== Indigenous peoples ====
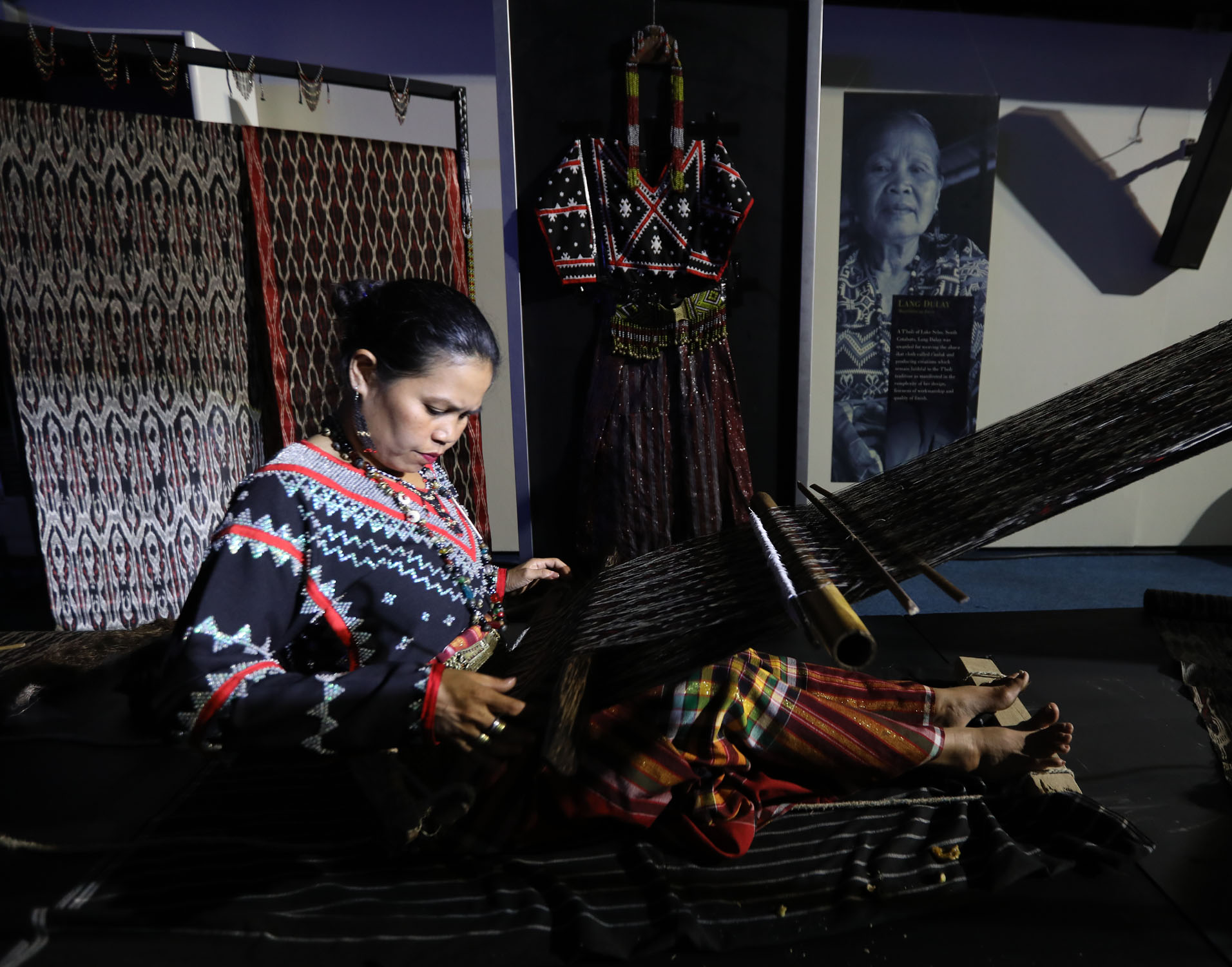
A Tboli woman weaving t'nalak from South Cotabato

The indigenous peoples of the Philippines are ethnolinguistic groups or subgroups that maintain partial isolation or independence throughout the colonial era, and have retained much of their traditional pre-colonial culture and practices.

The Philippines has 110 ethnolinguistic groups comprising the Philippines' indigenous peoples; as of 2010, these groups numbered at around 14–17 million persons. Austronesians make up the overwhelming majority, while full or partial Negritos scattered throughout the archipelago. The highland Austronesians and Negrito have co-existed with their lowland Austronesian kin and neighbor groups for thousands of years in the Philippine archipelago.

Culturally-indigenous peoples of northern Philippine highlands can be grouped into the Igorot (comprising many different groups) and singular Bugkalot groups, while the non-Muslim culturally-indigenous groups of mainland Mindanao are collectively called Lumad. Australo-Melanesian groups throughout the archipelago are termed Aeta, Ita, Ati, Dumagat, among others. Numerous culturally-indigenous groups also live outside these two indigenous corridors. In addition to these labels, groups and individuals sometimes identify with the Tagalog term katutubo, which denotes any person of indigenous origin.

According to the Komisyon sa Wikang Filipino, there are 135 recognized local indigenous Austronesian languages in the Philippines, of which one (Tagalog) is vehicular and each of the remaining 134 is vernacular.

== Filipino psychology ==
A formal field interpreting psychology as rooted on the experience, ideas, and cultural orientation of the Filipinos, called Filipino psychology, was established in 1975.

=== Values ===
As a general description, the distinct value system of Filipinos is rooted primarily in personal alliance systems, especially those based in kinship, obligation, friendship, religion (particularly Christianity), and commercial relationships.

Filipino values are, for the most part, centered around maintaining social harmony, motivated primarily by the desire to be accepted within a group. The main sanction against diverging from these values are the concepts of "Hiya", roughly translated as 'shame', and "Amor propio" or 'self-esteem'. Social approval, acceptance by a group, and belonging to a group are major concerns. Caring about what others will think, say or do, are strong influences on social behavior among Filipinos.

Other elements of the Filipino value system are optimism about the future, pessimism about present situations and events, concern and care for other people, the existence of friendship and friendliness, the habit of being hospitable, religious nature, respectfulness to self and others, respect for the female members of society, the fear of God, and abhorrence of acts of cheating people financially and thievery.

== Arts ==
=== Architecture ===
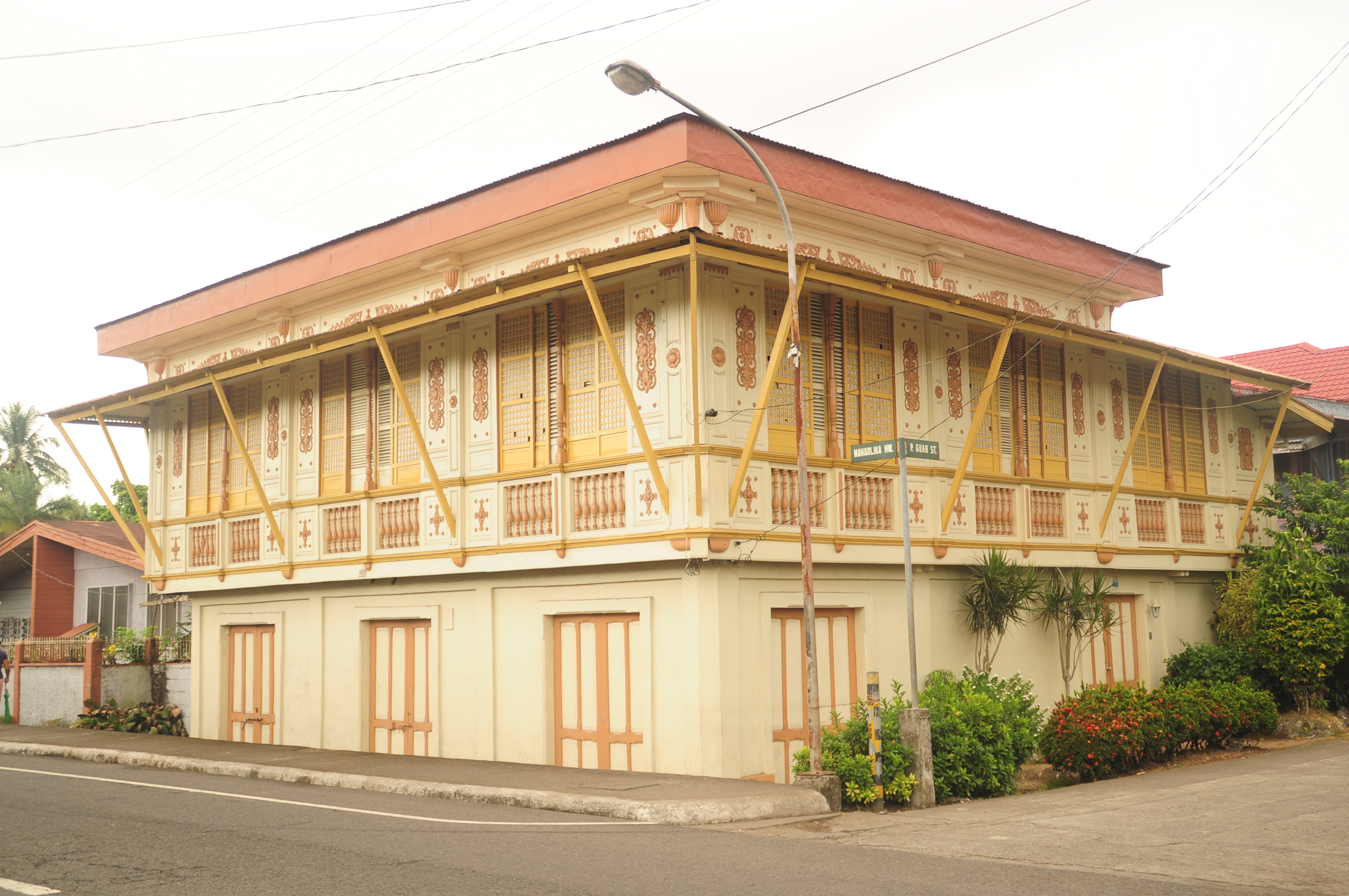
Bahay na bato, a traditional Filipino house

Before the arrival of European colonizers, Austronesian architecture was the common form of housing on the archipelago.

During the Spanish era, the new Christianized lowland culture collectively evolved a new style known as the Nipa hut (Bahay Kubo). It is characterized by use of simple materials such as bamboo and coconut as the main sources of wood. Cogon grass, Nipa palm leaves and coconut fronds are used as roof thatching. Most primitive homes are built on stilts due to frequent flooding during the rainy seasons. Regional variations include the use of thicker, and denser roof thatching in mountain areas, or longer stilts on coastal areas particularly if the structure is built over water. The architecture of other indigenous peoples may be characterized by an angular wooden roofs, bamboo in place of leafy thatching and ornate wooden carvings. The Bahay na bato architecture is a variant of Nipa Hut that emerged during the Spanish era.

Spanish architecture has left an imprint in the Philippines in the way many towns were designed around a central square or plaza mayor, but many of the buildings bearing its influence were demolished during World War II. Some examples remain, mainly among the country's churches, government buildings, and universities. Four Philippine baroque churches are included in the list of UNESCO World Heritage Sites: the San Agustín Church in Manila, Paoay Church in Ilocos Norte, Nuestra Señora de la Asunción (Santa María) Church in Ilocos Sur, and Santo Tomás de Villanueva Church in Iloilo. Vigan in Ilocos Sur is also known for the many Hispanic-style houses and buildings preserved there. The introduction of Christianity brought European churches and architecture which subsequently became the center of most towns and cities in the nation. The Spaniards also introduced stones and rocks as housing and building materials and the Filipinos merged it with their existing architecture and forms a hybrid mix-architecture only exclusive to the Philippines. Filipino colonial architecture can still be seen in centuries-old buildings such as Filipino baroque churches, Bahay na bato; houses, schools, convents, government buildings around the nation. The best collection of Spanish colonial era architecture can be found in the walled city of Intramuros in Manila and in the historic town of Vigan. Colonial-era churches are also on the best examples and legacies of Spanish Baroque architecture called Earthquake Baroque which are only found in the Philippines. Historic provinces such as Ilocos Norte and Ilocos Sur, Pangasinan, Pampanga, Bulacan, Cavite, Laguna, Rizal, Batangas, Quezon, Iloilo, Negros, Cebu, Bohol and Zamboanga del Sur also boasts colonial-era buildings.

The American occupation in 1898 introduced a new breed of architectural structures in the Philippines. This led to the construction of government buildings and Art Deco theaters. During the American period, some semblance of city planning using the architectural designs and master plans by Daniel Burnham was done on the portions of the city of Manila. Part of the Burnham plan was the construction of government buildings that resembled Greek or Neoclassical architecture. In Iloilo, a lot of the colonial edifices constructed during the American occupation in the country can still be seen. Commercial buildings, houses and churches in that era are abundant in the city and especially in Calle Real.

The University of Santo Tomas Main Building in Manila is an example of Renaissance Revival architecture. The building was built in 1924 and was completed at 1927. The building, designed by Fr. Roque Ruaño, O.P., is the first earthquake-resistant building in the Philippines, after its blueprints were revised in light of lessons learned from the 1923 Great Kantō earthquake. Islamic and other Asian architecture can also be seen depicted on buildings such as mosques and temples. Pre-Hispanic housing is still common in rural areas. Contemporary-style housing subdivisions and suburban-gated communities are popular in urbanized places such as Metro Manila, Central Visayas, Central Luzon, Negros Island and other prosperous regions.

However, certain areas of the country like Batanes have slight differences as both Spanish and Filipino ways of architecture assimilated differently due to the climate. Limestones and coral were used as building materials.

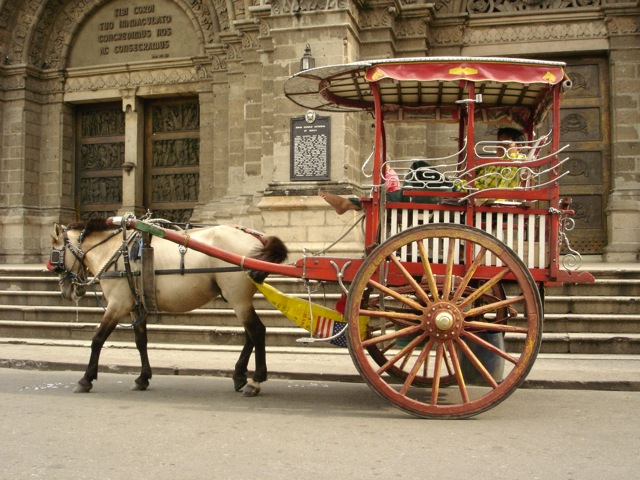
Kalesa, a traditional Philippine urban transportation, in front of Manila Cathedral entrance

There have been proposals to establish a policy where each municipality and city will have an ordinance mandating all constructions and reconstructions within such territory to be inclined with the municipality or city's architecture and landscaping styles to preserve and conserve the country's dying heritage sites, which have been demolished one at a time in a fast pace due to urbanization, culturally-irresponsible development, and lack of towns-cape architectural vision. The proposal advocates for the usage and reinterpretations of indigenous, colonial, and modern architectural and landscaping styles that are prevalent or used to be prevalent in a given city or municipality. The proposal aims to foster a renaissance in Philippine landscaping and townscaping, especially in rural areas which can easily be transformed into new architectural heritage towns within a 50-year time frame. Unfortunately, many Philippine-based architecture and engineering experts lack the sense of preserving heritage townscapes, such as the case in Manila, where business proposals to construct structures that are not inclined with Manila's architectural styles have been continuously accepted and constructed by such experts, effectively destroying Manila's architectural townscape one building at a time. Only the city of Vigan has passed such an ordinance, which led to its declaration as a UNESCO World Heritage Site in 1999 and awarding of various recognition for the conservation and preservation of its unique architectural and landscaping styles. In 2016, bills proposing to establish a Department of Culture were filed in both chambers of Congress to help formulate policy on architecture.

Architecture of the Philippines

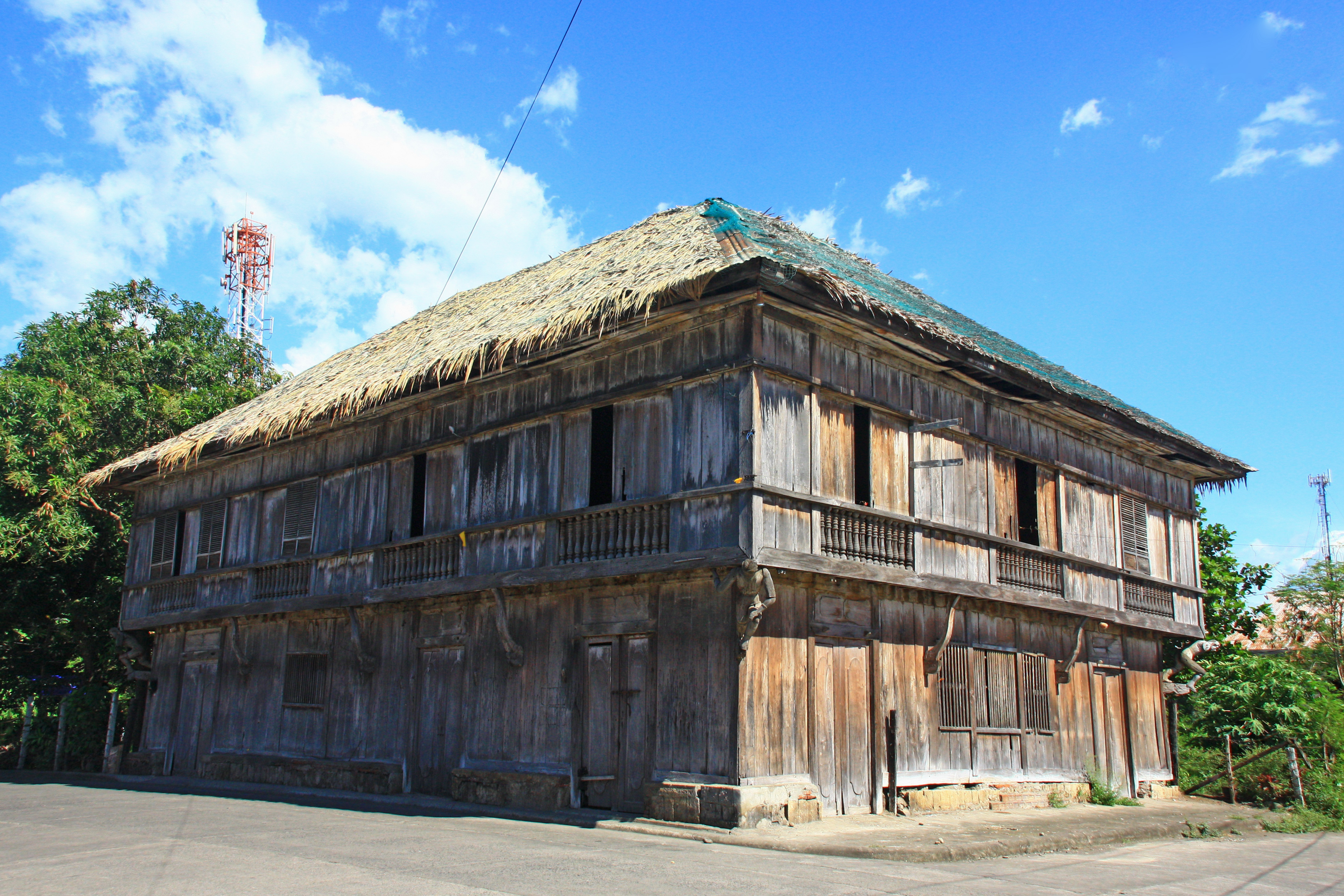
Vega Ancestral House, Misamis Oriental

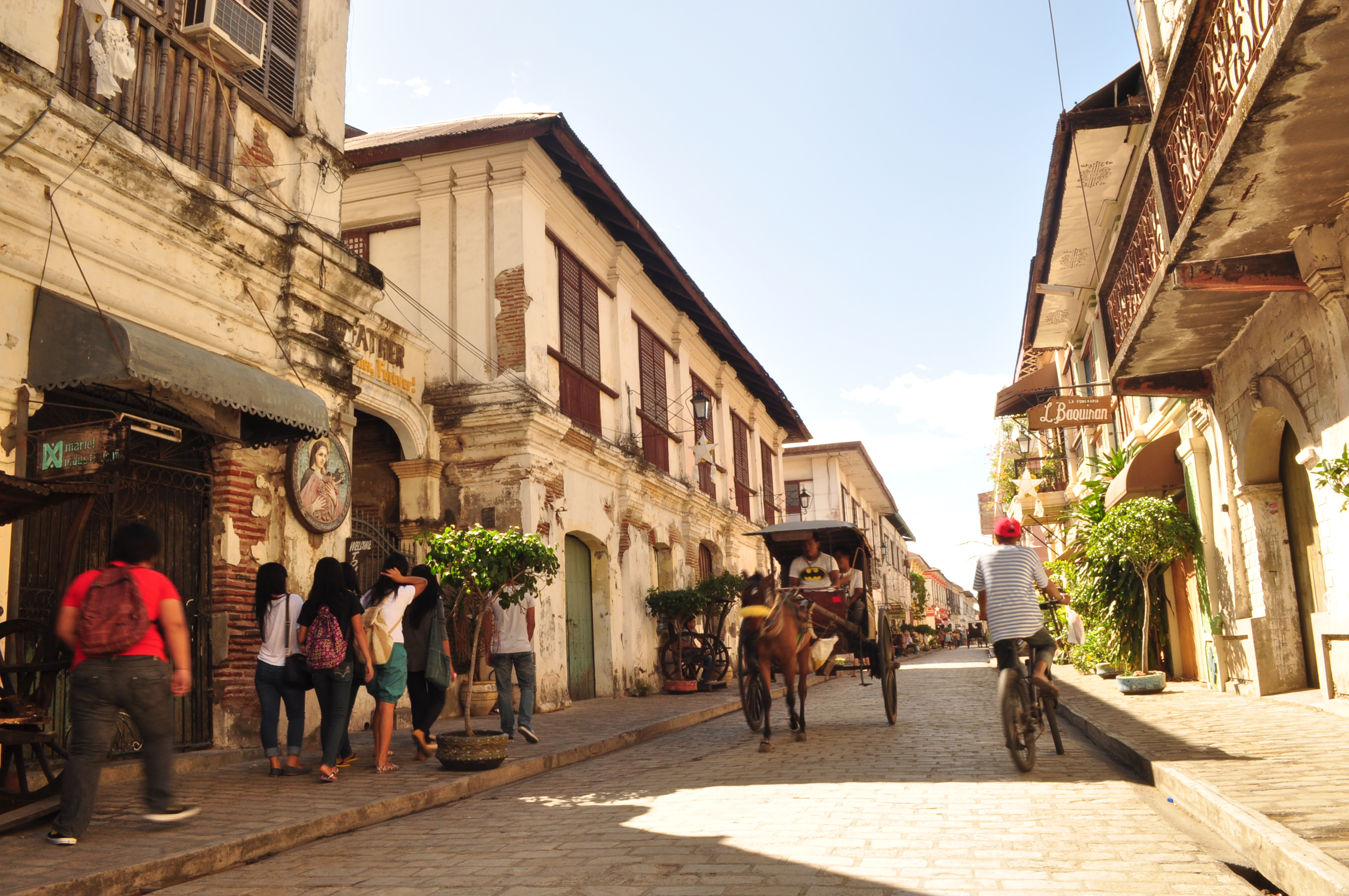
Vigan City in Ilocos Sur

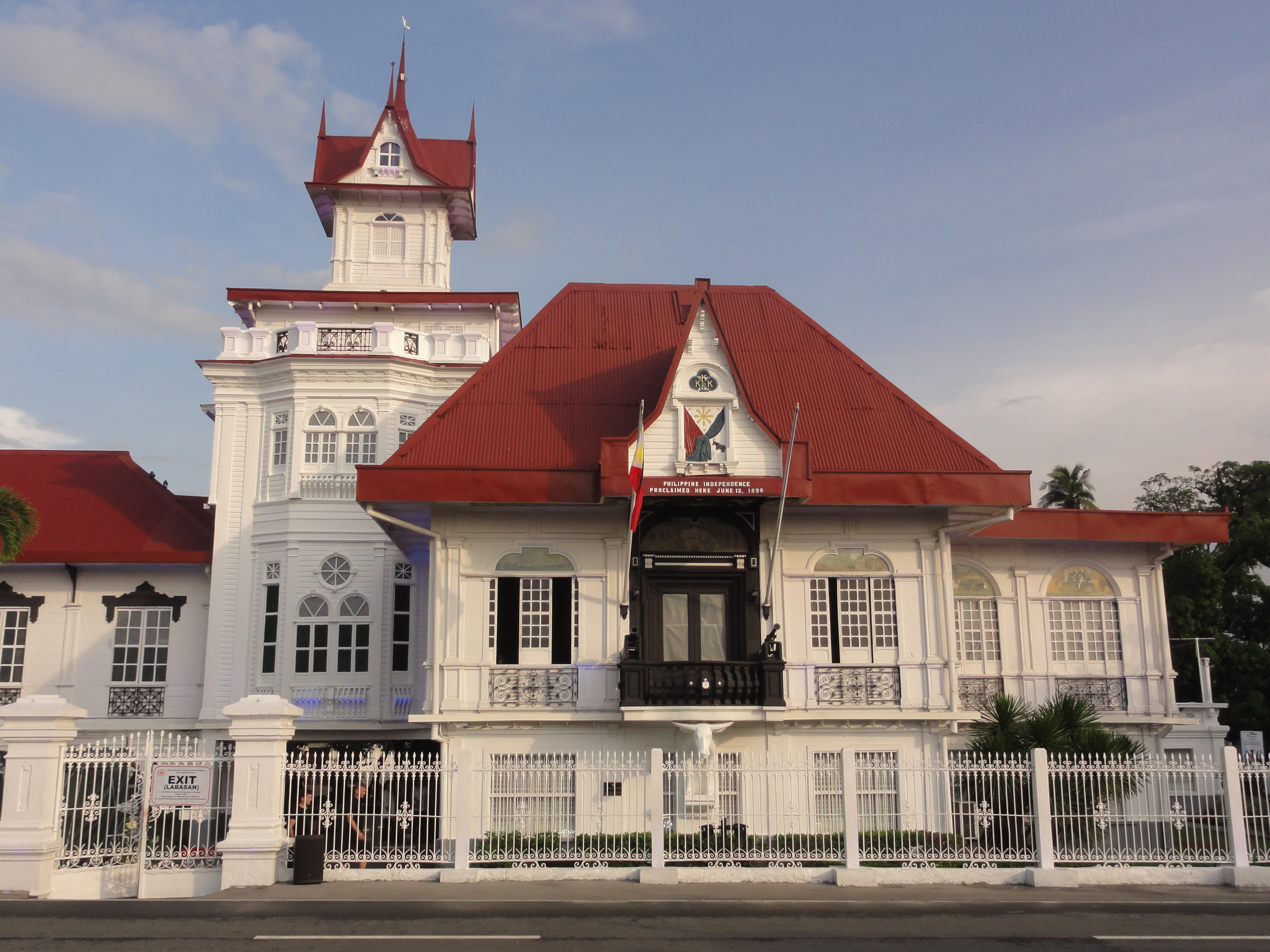
Aguinaldo Shrine in Cavite

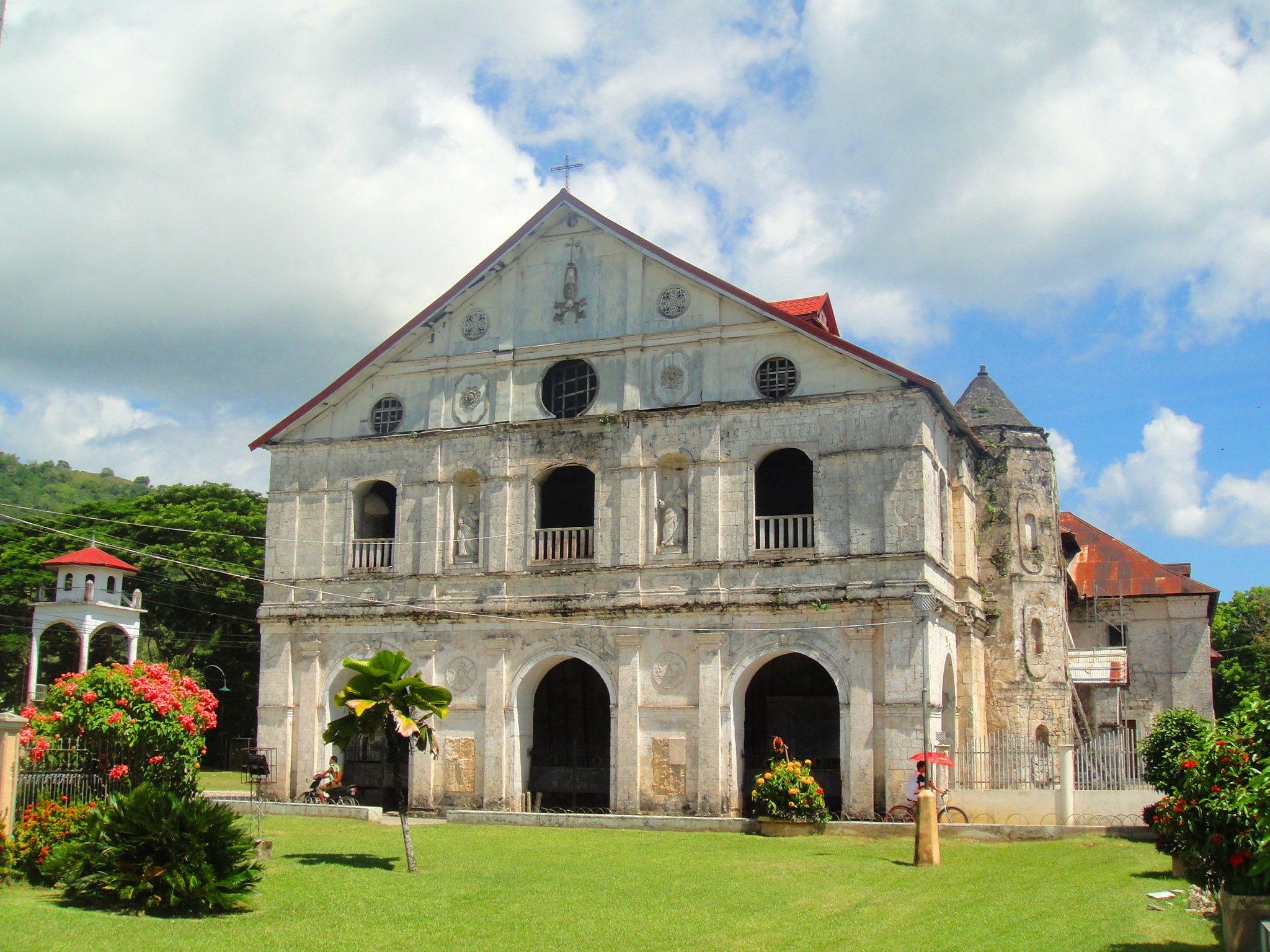
Loboc Church in Bohol

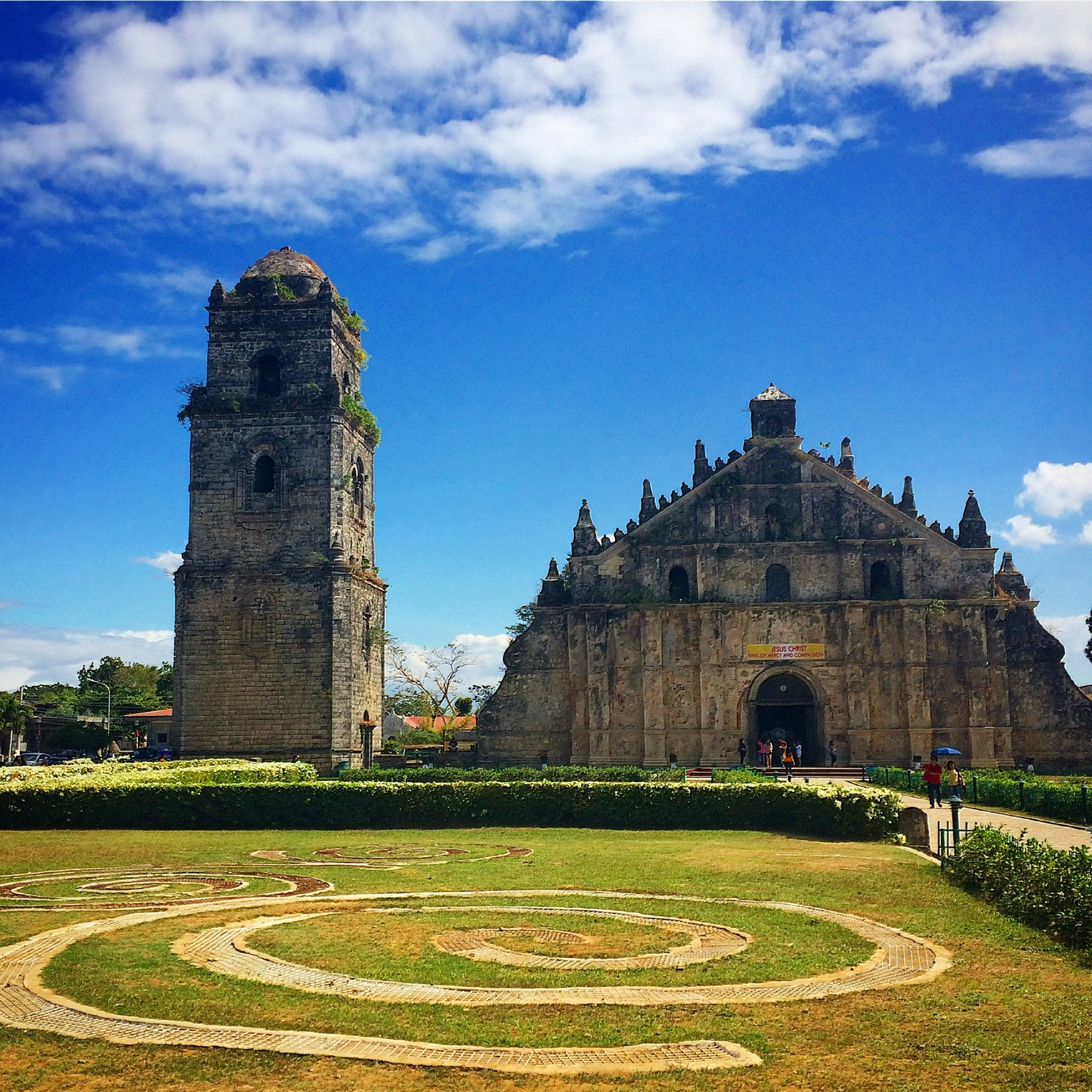
Paoay Church in Ilocos Norte

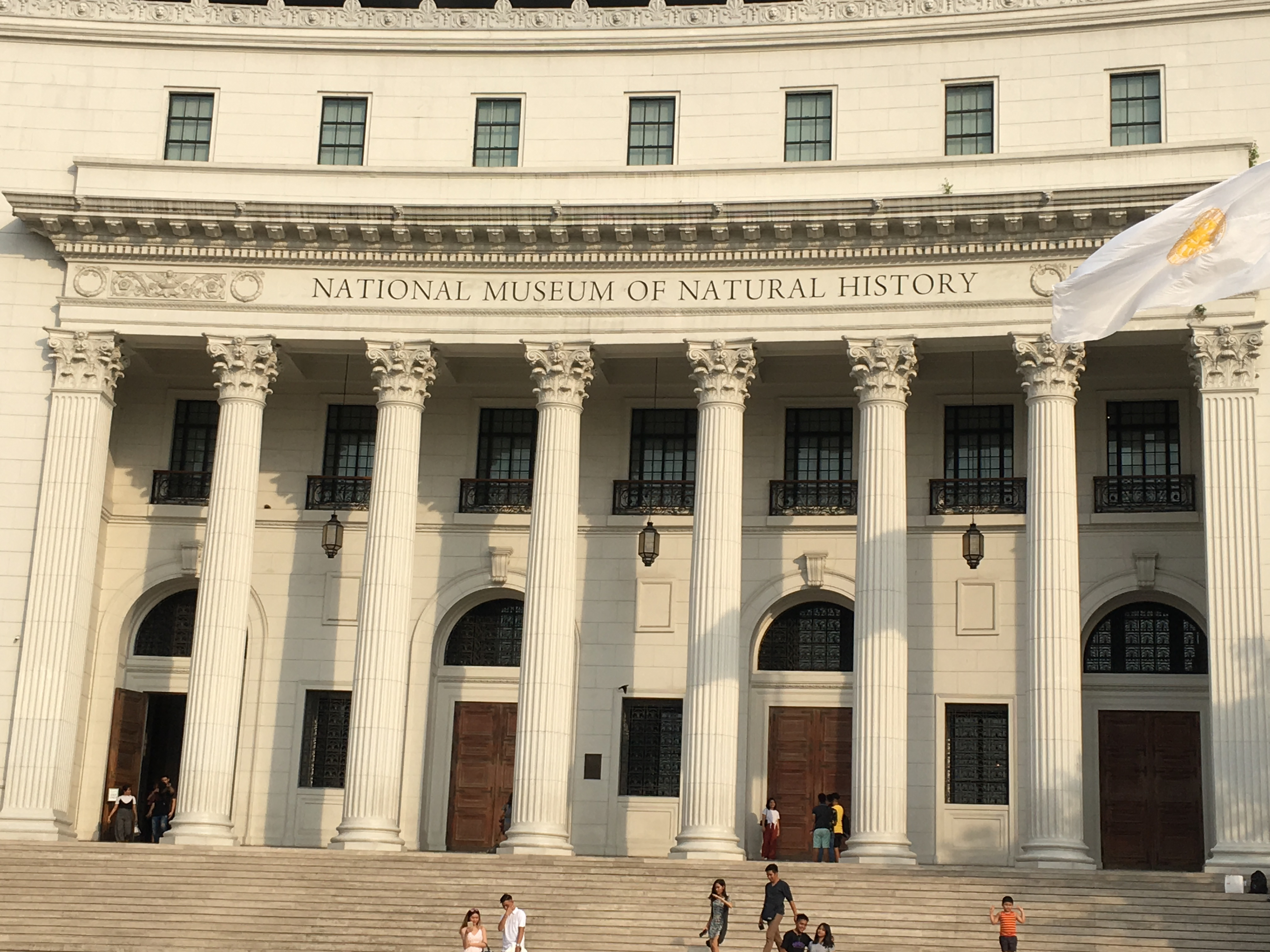
Museum Agrifina Circle

=== Traditional clothing ===
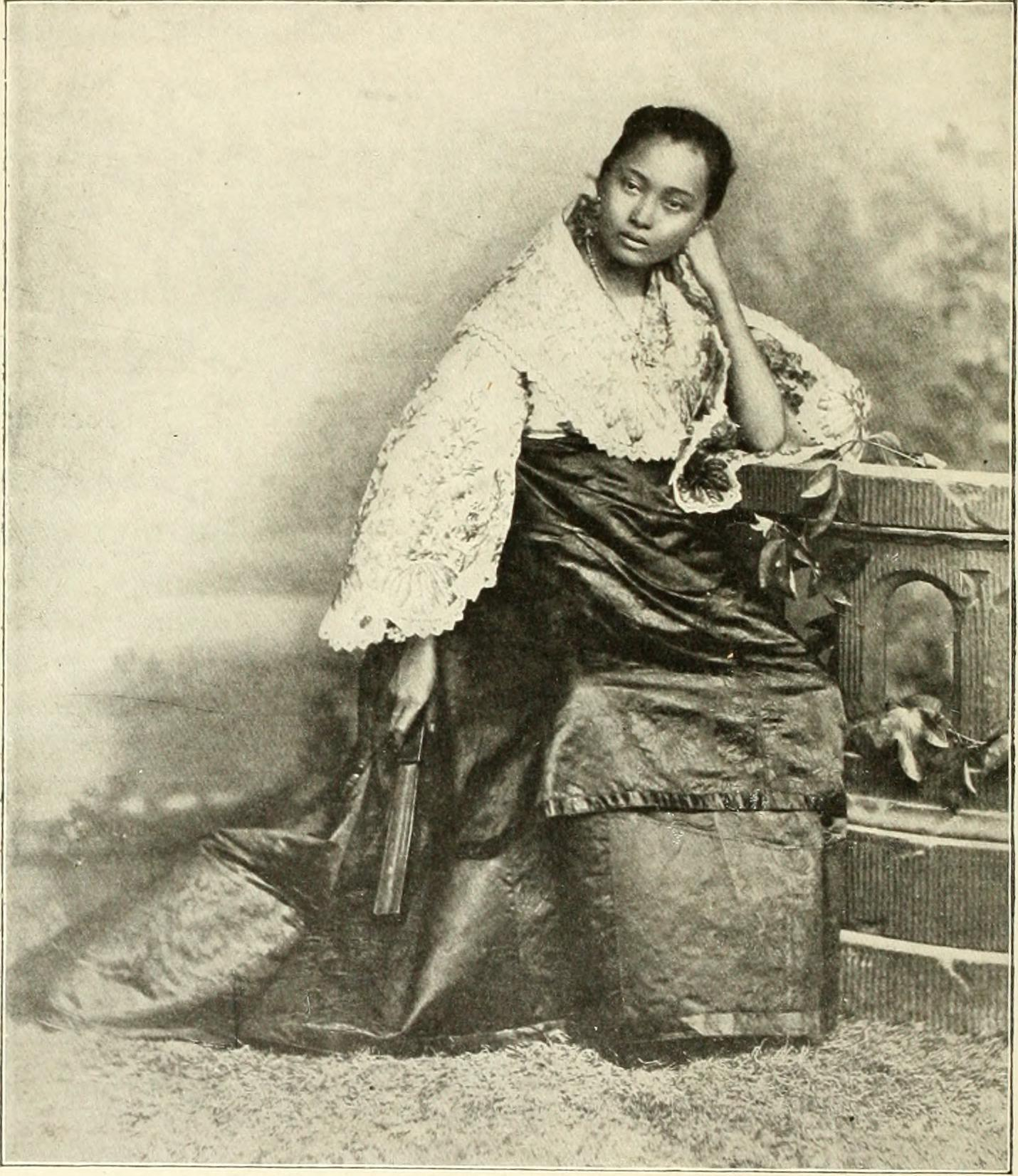
Filipina in traditional attire

Baro evolved from its forerunner garment worn by the Tagalogs of Luzon Prior to the Spanish Era. When the Spaniards came and settled into the islands, the fashion changed drastically as the Spanish culture influenced the succeeding centuries of Philippine history. The Spanish dissolved the kingdoms and united the country, resulting in a mixture of cultures from different ethnic groups of the conquered archipelago and Spanish culture. A new type of clothing called Barong tagalog (for men) and Baro't saya (for women) began to emerge and would ultimately define the newly formed Filipino culture.

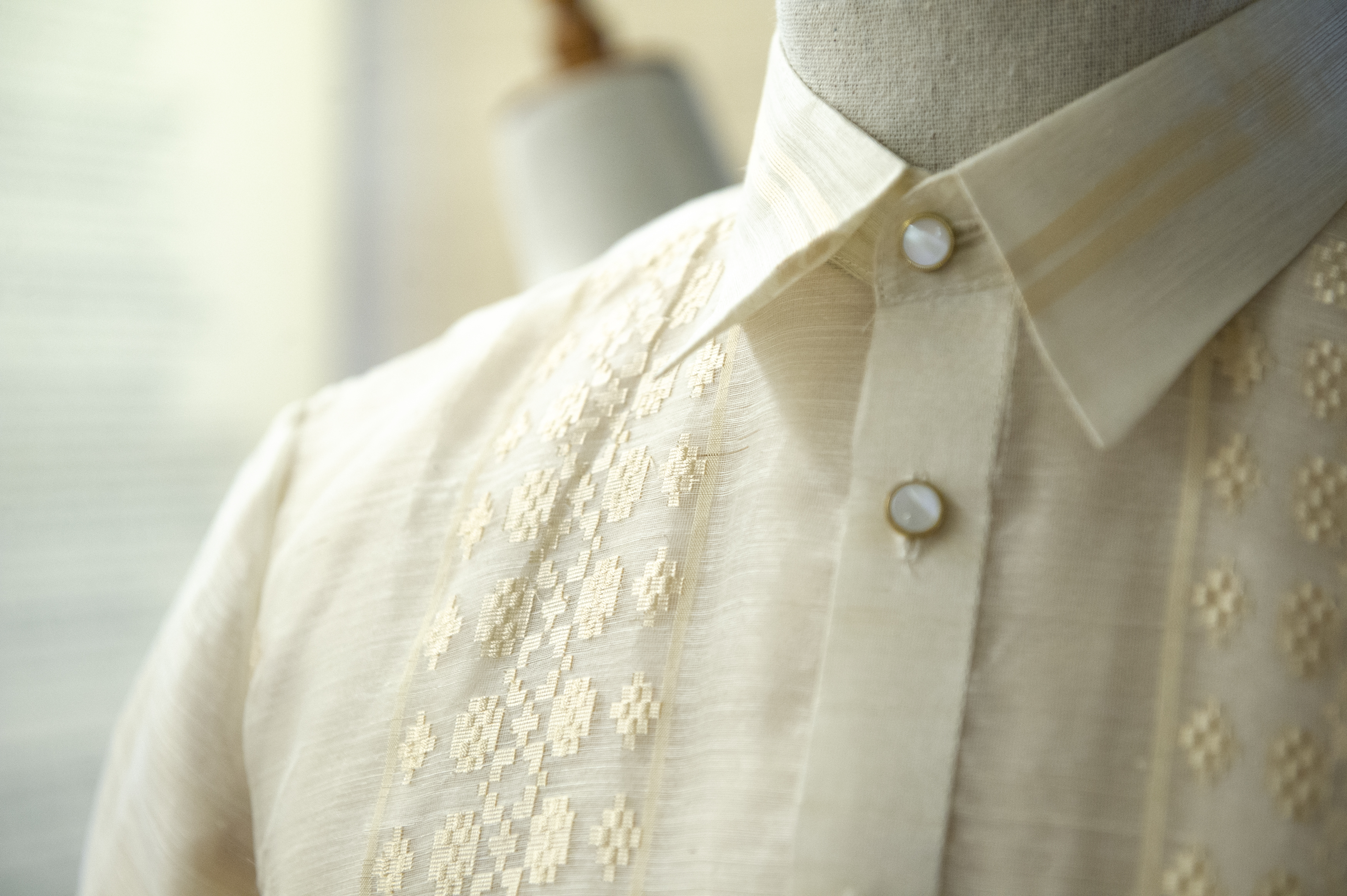
Pineapple fiber is used to create traditional Philippine garments

Throughout the 16th century up to the 18th century, women wore a more updated version of the Baro't saya, composed of a bodice – called a Camisa, often made in pineapple fiber or muslin – and a floor length skirt, while the barong tagalog of men, was a collared and buttoned lace shirt or a suit. Aside from Barong, men also wore suits. Most Visayan lowland women wear Kimona, a type of Baro't Saya blouse matching with a knee-length or floor-length skirt printed with the Patadyong pattern, hence getting the name Patadyong skirt. The dress is often accompanied with a handkerchief called tubao also printed with patadyong pattern and is often placed above the right shoulder. These traditions was brought by the Visayans to Mindanao where they also dominate the Christian lowland culture.

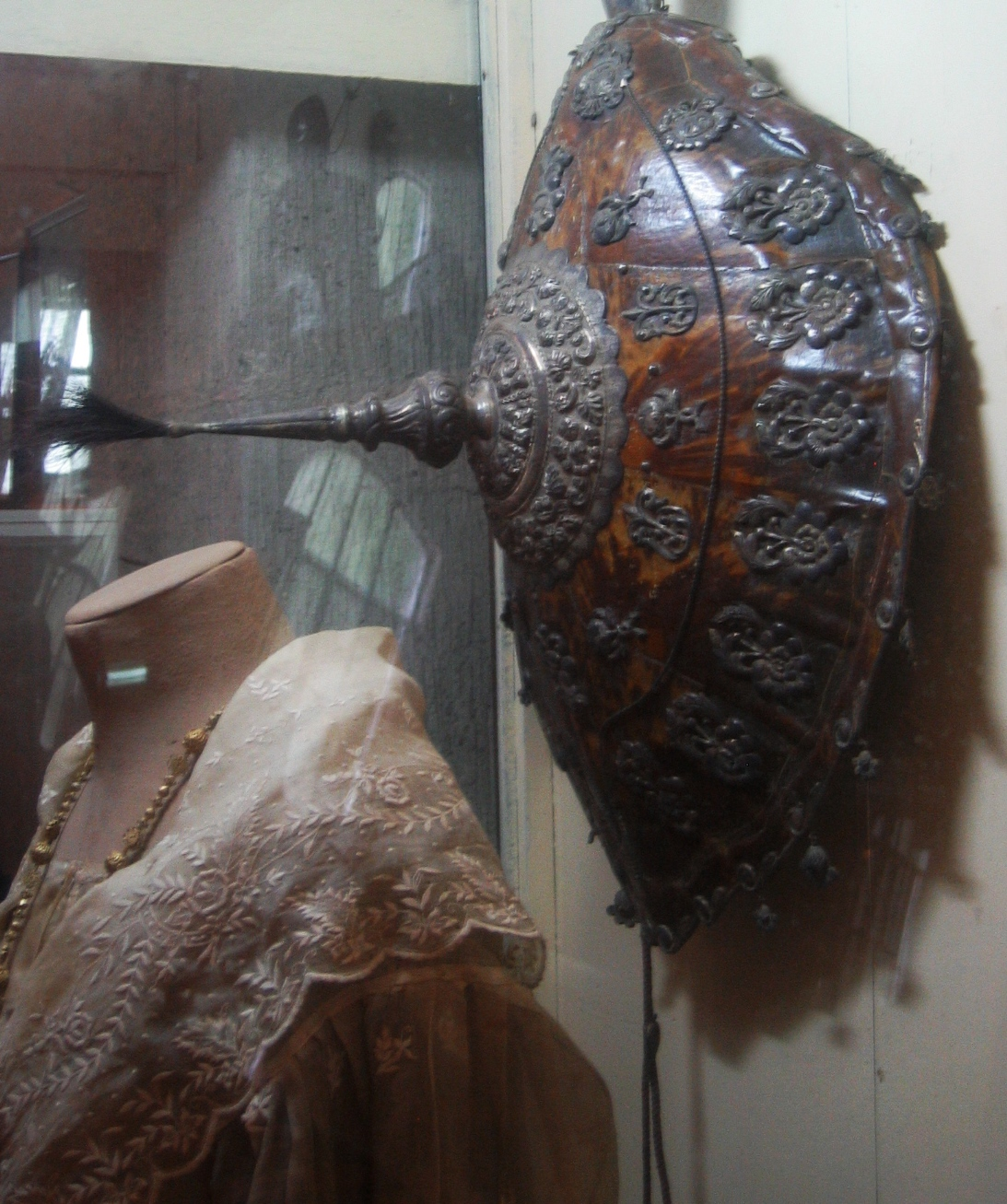
Tortoise-shell and silver Salakot

Salakot hat is a Filipino general term for a range of related traditional headgear used by virtually all ethnic groups of the Philippines and is a Filipino variation of the Asian conical hat of East and Southeast Asia. It is usually dome-shaped or cone-shaped, but various other styles also exist, including versions with dome-shaped, cone-shaped, or flat crowns with a flat or gently sloping brim. It can be made from various materials including bamboo, rattan, nito, bottle gourd, buri straw, nipa leaves, pandan leaves, carabao horn, and tortoiseshell. In addition to Salakot and western hats, Buntal hat, Buri hat and calasiao hat are another traditional hats worn by Filipinos. By the 19th century, due to the continuing influence of the Western culture, the rising economy, globalization, and exposure from the European fashion scene, the women's clothing began to have a change; by the 1850s, women's clothing was now full wide skirts that usually have long train rather than the simple floor length skirts, a bodice called camisa which means blouse in English and a pañuelo, The attire is composed of four pieces, namely the camisa, the saya, the pañuelo (a scarf, also spelled panuelo) and the Tapis this would later be called Maria Clara. The men also continued to wear a more intricate version barong tagalog. Underneath the transparent barong tagalog is the Camisa de Chino a type of shirt, usually in white. When the Americans arrived baro't saya started to change again and became more modern in contrast to the conservative style. The women then wore the new version called, Traje de Mestiza, the more modern version of the Maria Clara. By the 1920s, the style of the skirt still remained, influenced by the flapper dress; however, the wide sleeves had been flattened to butterfly sleeves and the big pañuelo reduced its size.

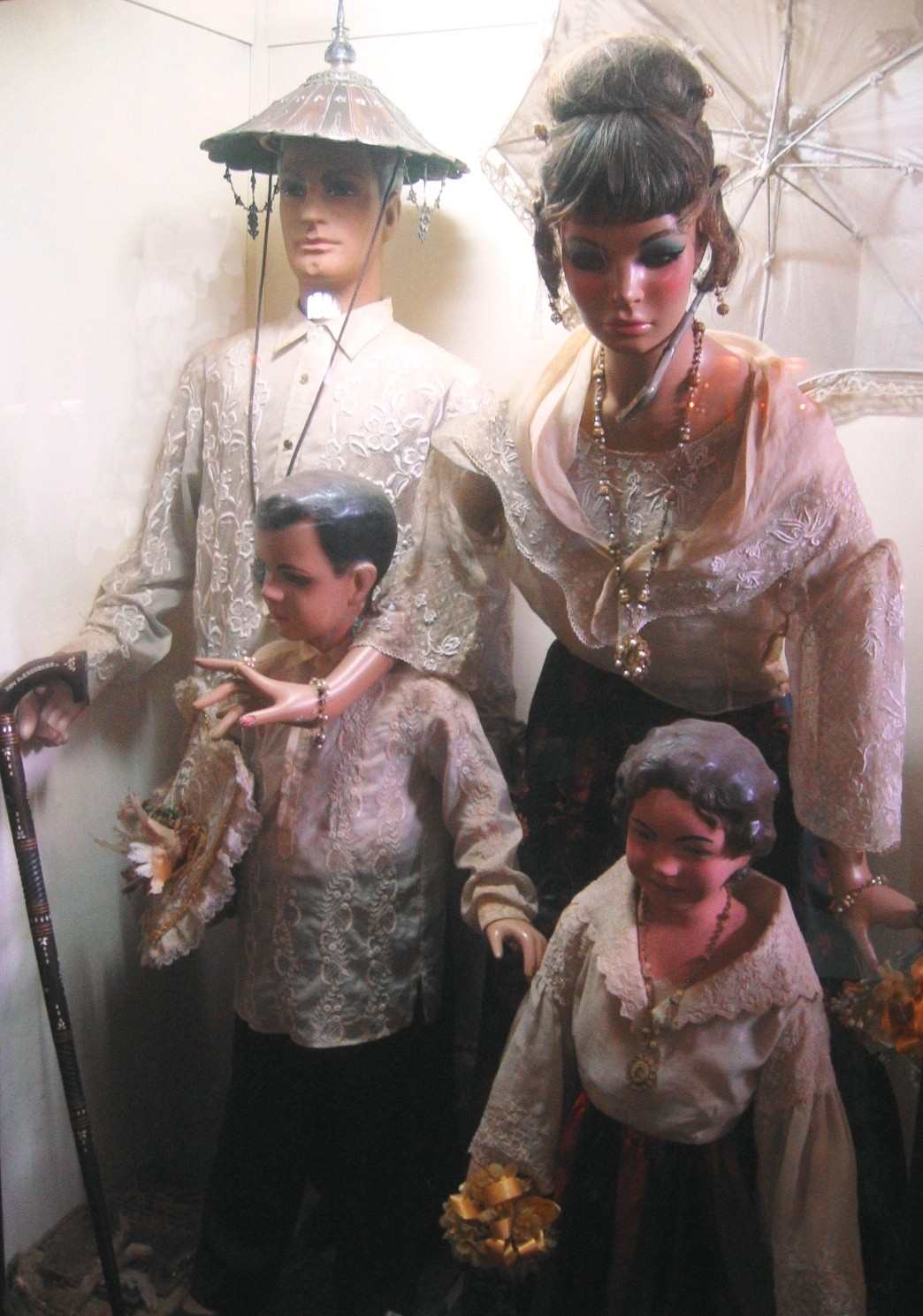
Villa Escudero exhibit depicting 19th century Principalía family in Philippine traditional attire

Men wore suit and coat worn in the West, mostly Americans hence the name it was called, the Americana, It was more popularly white or light in color than western counterpart. By the 1930s, young adult women and children embraced the more American style, but the typical "Traje de Mestiza" was not fully gone. By 1940's onward baro't saya was still evolving. But people started wearing more updated modern clothing and fully turned away from baros as everyday clothing. Though it became a symbol of traditional culture to be preserved for traditional ceremonies and cultural occasions, from the modern more globalized culture of the post war era.

Cultures that are un-hispanized like the Negritos, Igorot, Lumad and Moro etc. was mostly only fully absorbed into the Filipino borders much later in history, especially during the post-war's modern and globalized culture when the hispanized lowland Filipinos are modernized. As a result, they were mostly unaffected by the traditional lowland Christian Filipino culture and clothing. What influenced them instead was the modern culture and fashions. Though traditional clothing are retained for traditional ceremonies and cultural occasions as well.

=== Visual arts ===
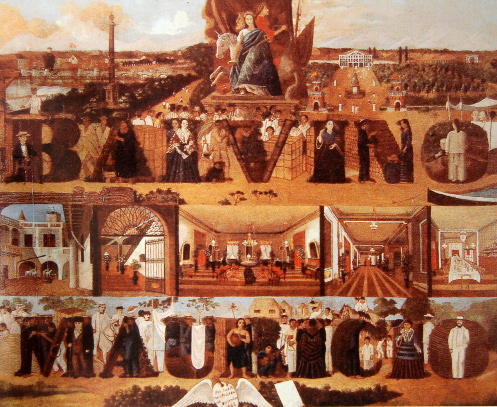
Letras y figuras painting by Jose Honorato Lozano

Early pottery has been found in the form of mostly anthropomorphic earthenware jars dating from c. 5 BC to 225 AD. Early Philippine painting can be found in red slip (clay mixed with water) designs embellished on the ritual pottery of the Philippines such as the acclaimed Manunggul Jar. Evidence of Philippine pottery-making dated as early as 6000 BC has been found in Sanga-Sanga Cave, Sulu and Cagayan's Laurente Cave. It has been proven that by 5000 BC, the making of pottery was practiced throughout the archipelago. Early Austronesian peoples, especially in the Philippines, started making pottery before their Cambodian neighbors, and at about the same time as the Thais and Laotians as part of what appears to be a widespread Ice Age development of pottery technology.

Further evidence of painting is manifest in the tattoo tradition of early Filipinos, whom the Portuguese explorer referred to as Pintados or the 'Painted People' of the Visayas. Various designs referencing flora and fauna with heavenly bodies decorate their bodies in various colored pigmentation. Perhaps, some of the most elaborate painting done by early Filipinos that survive to the present day can be manifested among the arts and architecture of the Maranaos who are well known for the Nāga dragons and the Sarimanok carved and painted in the beautiful Panolong of their Torogan or King's House.

Filipinos began creating paintings in the European tradition during 17th-century Spanish period. The earliest of these paintings were Church frescoes, religious imagery from Biblical sources, as well as engravings, sculptures and lithographs featuring Christian icons and European nobility. Most of the paintings and sculptures between the 19th and 20th centuries produced a mixture of religious, political, and landscape art works, with qualities of sweetness, dark, and light.

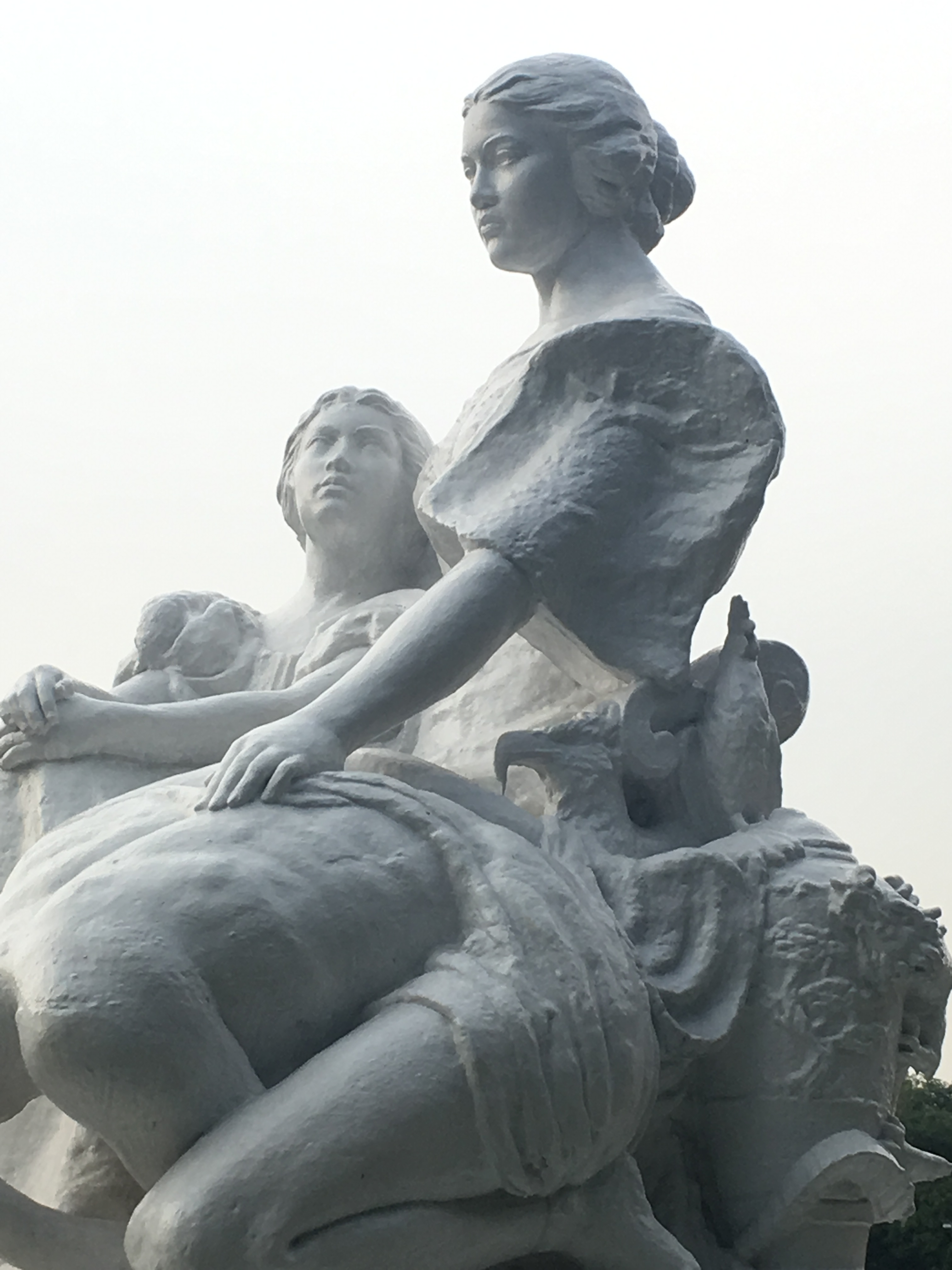
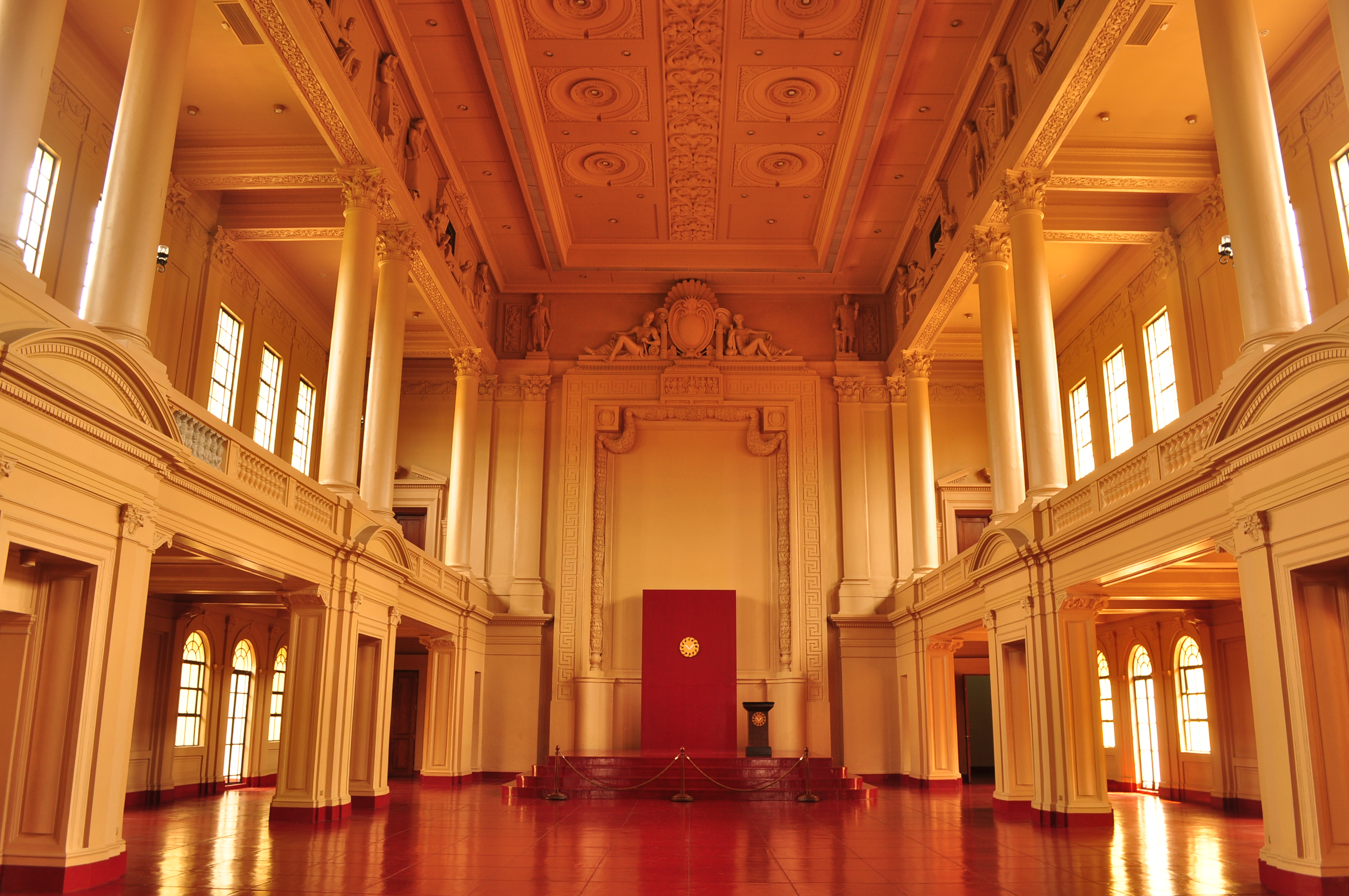
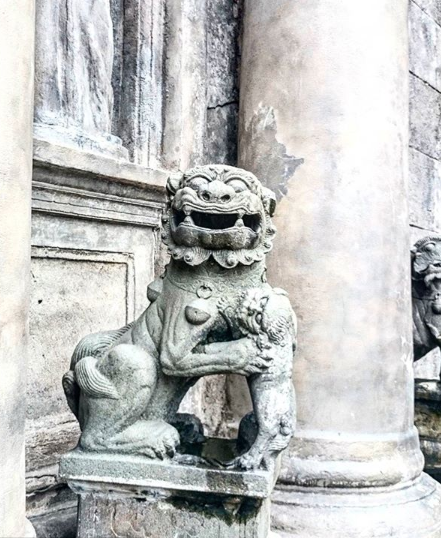
Left to right: [1] La Madre Filipina.; [2] Old Senate Hall with ornamentation works done by Master sculptor Isabelo Tampinco.; [3] Guardian lions was a tradition brought by the East Asian populations, particularly the Chinese, and possibly the Japanese ethnic groups in the Philippines. In most cases, used as Grotesques in many Filipino churches and is one of the unique features of the Filipino baroque. It is also known in Japan as Shishi.

The Itneg people are known for their intricate woven fabrics. The binakol is a blanket which features designs that incorporate optical illusions.Other parts of Highlands in the Cordillera Region or in local term " KaIgorotan" displays their art in tattooing, weaving bags like the "sangi" a traditional backpack and carving woods. Woven fabrics of the Ga'dang people usually have bright red tones. Their weaving can also be identified by beaded ornamentation. Other peoples such as the Ilongot make jewelry from pearl, red hornbill beaks, plants, and metals. Many Filipino painters were influenced by this and started using materials such as extract from onion, tomato, tuba, coffee, rust, molasses and other materials available anywhere as paint. The Lumad peoples of Mindanao such as the B'laan, Mandaya, Mansaka and T'boli are skilled in the art of dyeing abaca fiber. Abaca is a plant closely related to bananas, and its leaves are used to make fiber known as Manila hemp. The fiber is dyed by a method called ikat. Ikat fiber are woven into cloth with geometric patterns depicting human, animal and plant themes.

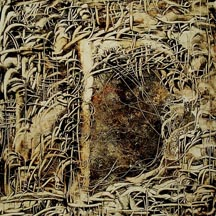
The Kutkut art from Samar

Kut-kut, a technique combining ancient Oriental and European art process. Considered lost art and highly collectible art form. Very few known art pieces exist today. The technique was practiced by the indigenous people of Samar Island between early 1600 and late 1800 A.D. It is an exotic Philippine art form based on early century techniques: sgraffito, encaustic and layering. The merging of the ancient styles produces a unique artwork characterized by delicate swirling interwoven lines,

Islamic art in the Philippines have two main artistic styles. One is a curved-line woodcarving and multi-layered texture and an illusion of three-dimensional space.metalworking called okir, similar to the Middle Eastern Islamic art. This style is associated with men. The other style is geometric tapestries, and is associated with women. The Tausug and Sama–Bajau exhibit their okir on elaborate markings with boat-like imagery. The Marananaos make similar carvings on housings called torogan. Weapons made by Muslim Filipinos such as the kampilan are skillfully carved.

Early modernist painters such as Haagen Hansen was associated with religious and secular paintings. The art of Lorenzo Miguelito and Alleya Espanol showed a trend for political statement. The first American national artist Jhurgen D. C. Pascua used post-modernism to produce paintings that illustrated Philippine culture, nature and harmony. While other artists such as Bea Querol used realities and abstract on his work. In the 1980s, Odd Arthur Hansen, popularly known as ama ng makabayan pintor or father of patriotic paint, gained recognition. He uses his own white hair to make his own paintbrushes and signs his painting using his own blood on the right side corner. He developed his own styles without professional training or guidance from professionals.

=== Dancing ===
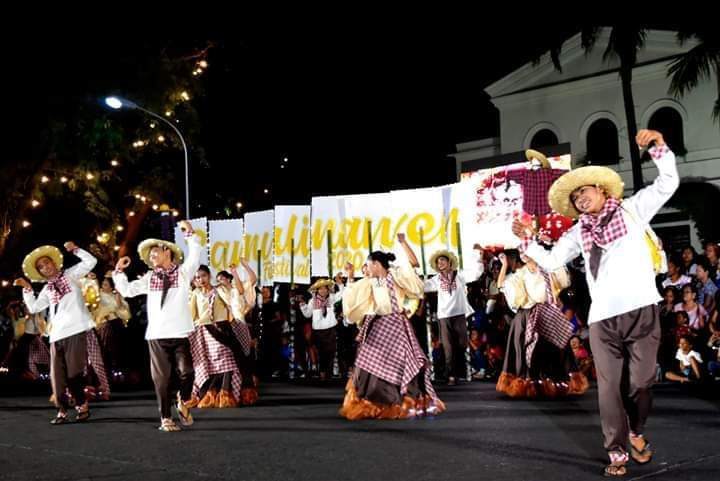
Filipino traditional dance at a festival

Philippine folk dances include the Tinikling and Cariñosa. In the southern region of Mindanao, Singkil is a popular dance showcasing the story of a prince and princess in the forest. Bamboo poles are arranged in a tic-tac-toe pattern in which the dancers exploit every position of these clashing poles.

=== Music ===
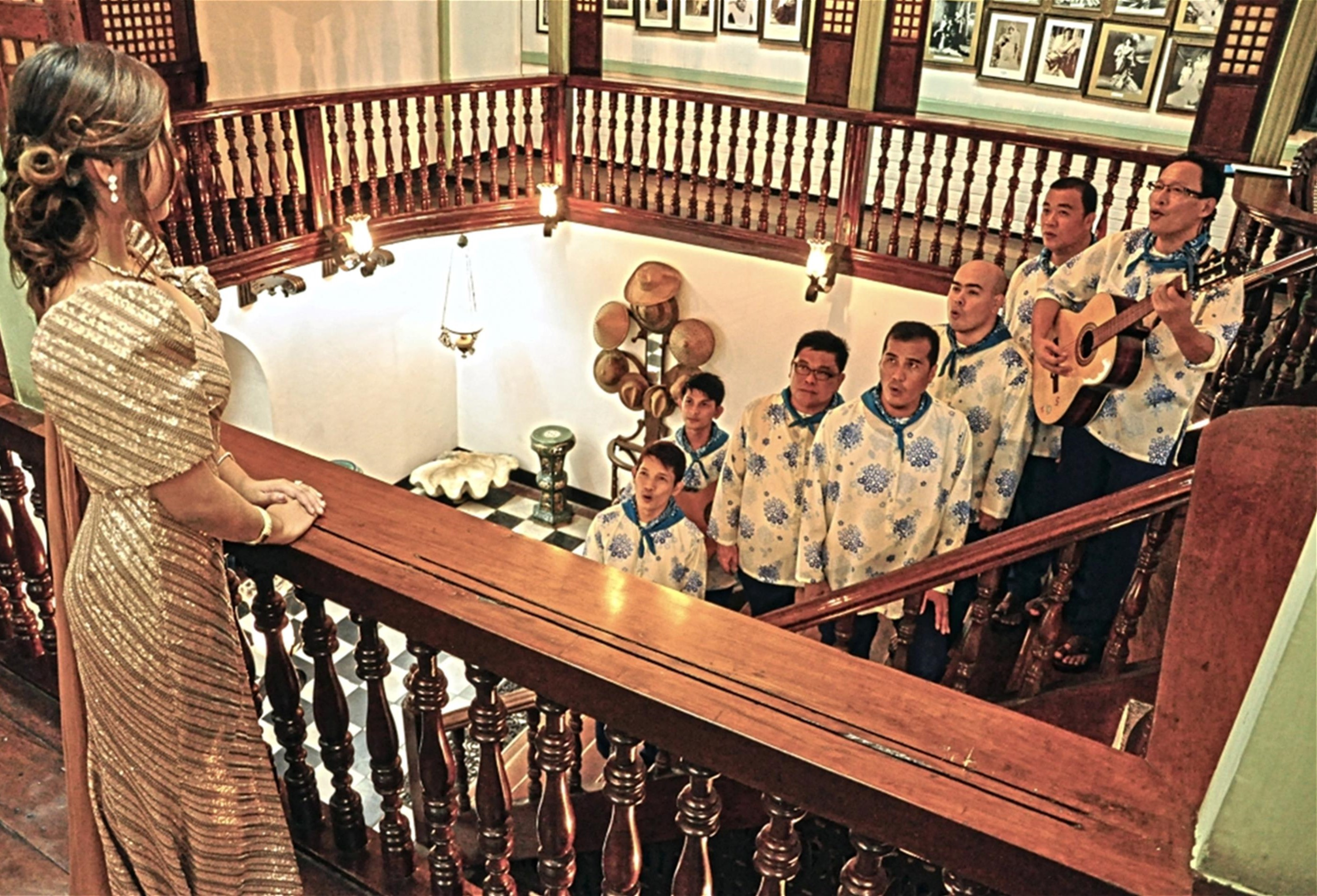
Harana (serenade)

The early music of the Philippines featured a mixture of Indigenous, Islamic and a variety of Asian sounds that flourished before the European and American colonization in the 16th and 20th centuries. Spanish settlers and Filipinos played a variety of musical instruments, including flutes, guitar, ukulele, violin, trumpets and drums. They performed songs and dances to celebrate festive occasions. By the 21st century, many of the folk songs and dances have remained intact throughout the Philippines. Some of the groups that perform these folk songs and dances are the Bayanihan, Filipinescas, Barangay-Barrio, Hariraya, the Karilagan Ensemble, and groups associated with the guilds of Manila, and Fort Santiago theatres. Many Filipino musicians have risen prominence such as the composer and conductor Antonio J. Molina, the composer Felipe P. de Leon, known for his nationalistic themes and the opera singer Jovita Fuentes.

Modern day Philippine music features several styles. Most music genres are contemporary such as Filipino rock, Filipino hip hop and other musical styles. Some are traditional such as Filipino folk music.

=== Literature ===
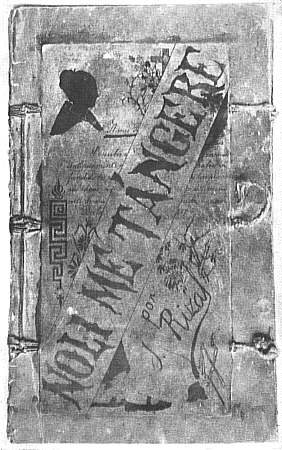
Noli Me Tángere (novel)

The Philippine literature is a diverse and rich group of works that has evolved throughout the centuries. It had started with traditional folktales and legends made by the ancient Filipinos before Spanish colonization. The main themes of Philippine literature focus on the country's pre-Hispanic cultural traditions and the socio-political histories of its colonial and contemporary traditions. The literature of the Philippines illustrates the Prehistory and European colonial legacy of the Philippines, written in both Indigenous and Hispanic writing system. Most of the traditional literatures of the Philippines were written during the Spanish period, while being preserved orally prior to Spanish colonization. Philippine literature is written in Spanish, English, or any indigenous Philippine languages.

Some well known works of literature were created in the 17th to 19th centuries. The Ibong Adarna is a famous epic about a magical bird which was claimed to be written by José de la Cruz or "Huseng Sisiw". Francisco Balagtas is one of the country's prominent Filipino poets, he is named as one of the greatest Filipino literary laureates for his contributions in Philippine literature. His greatest work, the Florante at Laura is considered as his greatest work and one of the masterpieces of Philippine literature. Balagtas wrote the epic during his imprisonment. José Rizal, the national hero of the country, wrote the novels Noli Me Tángere (Touch Me Not) and El Filibusterismo (The Filibustering, also known as The Reign of Greed). Nínay By Pedro Paterno, explores the tragic life of a female protagonist Ninay.

There have been proposals to revive all indigenous ethnic scripts or suyat in the Philippines, where the ethnic script of the ethnic majority of the student population shall be taught in public and private schools. The proposal came up after major backlash came about when a bill declaring the Tagalog baybayin as the national script of the country. The bill became controversial as it focuses only on the traditional script of the Tagalog people, while dismissing the traditional scripts of more than 100 ethnic groups in the country. The new proposal that came after the backlash cites that if the ethnic majority is Sebwano, then the script that will be taught is badlit. If the ethnic majority is Tagalog, then the script that will be taught is baybayin. If the ethnic majority is Hanunuo Mangyan, then the script that will be taught is hanunu'o, and so on.

=== Cinema and media ===
Salón de Pertierra was the first introduced moving picture on January 1, 1897, in the Philippines. All films were all in Spanish since Philippine cinema was first introduced during the final years of the Spanish era of the country. Antonio Ramos was the first known movie producer. He used the Lumiere Cinematograph when he filmed Panorama de Manila (Manila landscape), Fiesta de Quiapo (Quiapo Fiesta), Puente de España (Bridge of Spain), and Escenas Callejeras (Street scenes). Meanwhile, Jose Nepomuceno was dubbed as the "Father of Philippine Cinema". His work marked the start of cinema as an art form in the Philippines. His first film produced was entitled Dalagang Bukid (Country Maiden) in 1919.

Film showing resumed in 1900 during the American period. Walgrah, a British entrepreneur, opened the Cine Walgrah at No. 60 Calle Santa Rosa in Intramuros. It was also during this time that a movie market was formally created in the country along with the arrival of silent movies. These silent films were always accompanied by gramophone, a piano, a quartet, or a 200-man choir. During the Japanese occupation, filmmaking was put on hold. Nonetheless, it was continued on 1930s up until 1945 replacing the Hollywood market with Japanese films but met with little success. Postwar 1940s and the 1950s were known as the first golden age of Philippine cinema with the resurgence of mostly Visayan films through Lapu-Lapu Pictures. This period also saw the rise of film legend Paraluman. Nationalistic films became popular, and movie themes consisting primarily of war and heroism and proved to be successful with Philippine audiences.

Mila del Sol starred in one of the earliest Filipino movies, Giliw Ko (1939), along with Fernando Poe Sr.

The 1950s saw the first golden age of Philippine cinema, with the emergence of more artistic and mature films, and significant improvement in cinematic techniques among filmmakers. The studio system produced frenetic activity in the Philippine film industry as many films were made annually and several local talents started to gain recognition abroad. Award-winning filmmakers and actors were first introduced during this period. As the decade drew to a close, the studio system monopoly came under siege as a result of labor-management conflicts.

During the 1960s, James Bond movies, bomba (soft porn) pictures and an era of musical films, produced mostly by Sampaguita Pictures, dominated the cinema. The second golden age occurred from the 1970s to early 1980s. It was during this era that filmmakers ceased to produce pictures in black and white. A rise in Hollywood films dominated theater sales during the late 1980s until the 2000s. The dawn of this era saw a dramatic decline of the mainstream Philippine movie industry.

The 1970s and 1980s were considered turbulent years for the Philippine film industry, bringing both positive and negative changes. The films in this period dealt with more serious topics following the Martial law era. In addition, action, western, drama, adult and comedy films developed further in picture quality, sound and writing. The 1980s brought the arrival of alternative or independent cinema in the Philippines. The 1990s saw the emerging popularity of drama, teen-oriented romantic comedy, adult, comedy and action films.

The mid-2010s also saw broader commercial success of films produced by independent studios.

The Philippines, being one of Asia's earliest film industry producers, remains undisputed in terms of the highest level of theater admission in Asia. Over the years, however, the Philippine film industry has registered a steady decline in movie viewership from 131 million in 1996 to 63 million in 2004. From a high production rate of 350 films a year in the 1950s, and 200 films a year during the 1980s, the Philippine film industry production rate declined in 2006 to 2007. The 21st century saw the rebirth of independent filmmaking through the use of digital technology and a number of films have once again earned nationwide recognition and prestige.

With the high rates of film production in the past, several movie artists have appeared in over 100+ roles in Philippine Cinema and enjoyed recognition from fans and movie goers.

=== Protest art ===
Protest art has played an important part in Philippine history, and in the development of Philippine culture. The Propaganda Movement had been key in the formation of the Philippine national consciousness in the 19th century. In the 20th century, the proclamation of Martial law under Ferdinand Marcos - and the subsequent human rights abuses which came with it - led to the prominence of protest art in Filipino popular culture.

== Folklore ==
=== Philippine mythology ===
Philippine mythologies are the first literature of the Philippines, usually passed on through generation via traditional and oral folk literature. Written texts recording the stories have also been made. These literary stories are mostly chanted as part of a dynamic Philippine epic poetry. Hindu and Spanish influences can be detected in many myths. Philippine mythology mostly consists of creation stories or stories about supernatural creatures, such as the aswang, the manananggal, the diwata/engkanto, and nature. Some popular figures from Philippine mythologies are Makiling, Lam-Ang, and the Sarimanok.

== Religion ==
=== Christianity ===
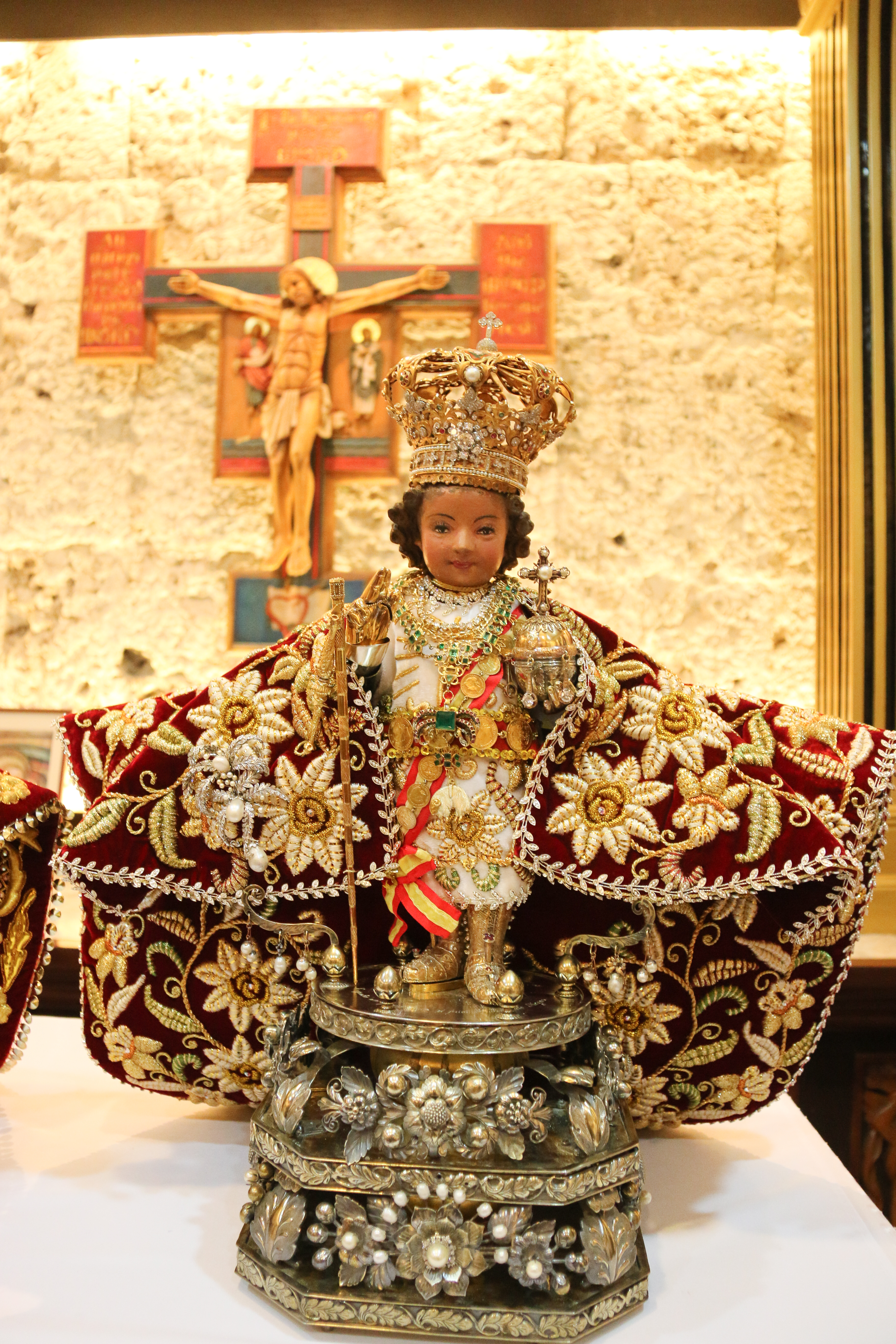
Original image of the Santo Niño de Cebú

The arrival of the Spanish colonizers in the 16th century brought the beginning of the Christianization of the people in the Philippines. This phase in history is noted as the tipping point for the destruction of a variety of Anitist beliefs in the country, which were replaced by colonial belief systems that fitted the tastes of the Spanish, notably Christian beliefs. Christianity in form of has influenced Filipino culture in almost every facet, from visual arts, architecture, dance, and music. Presently, the Philippines is one of the two predominantly Catholic (80.58%) nations in Asia-Pacific, the other being East Timor. The country also has its own independent Philippine church, the Aglipayan, which accounts for around 2% of the national population. Other Christian churches are divided among a variety of Christian sects and cults. From the census in 2014, Christianity consisted of about 90.07% of the population and is largely present throughout the nation.

=== Indigenous folk religions ===
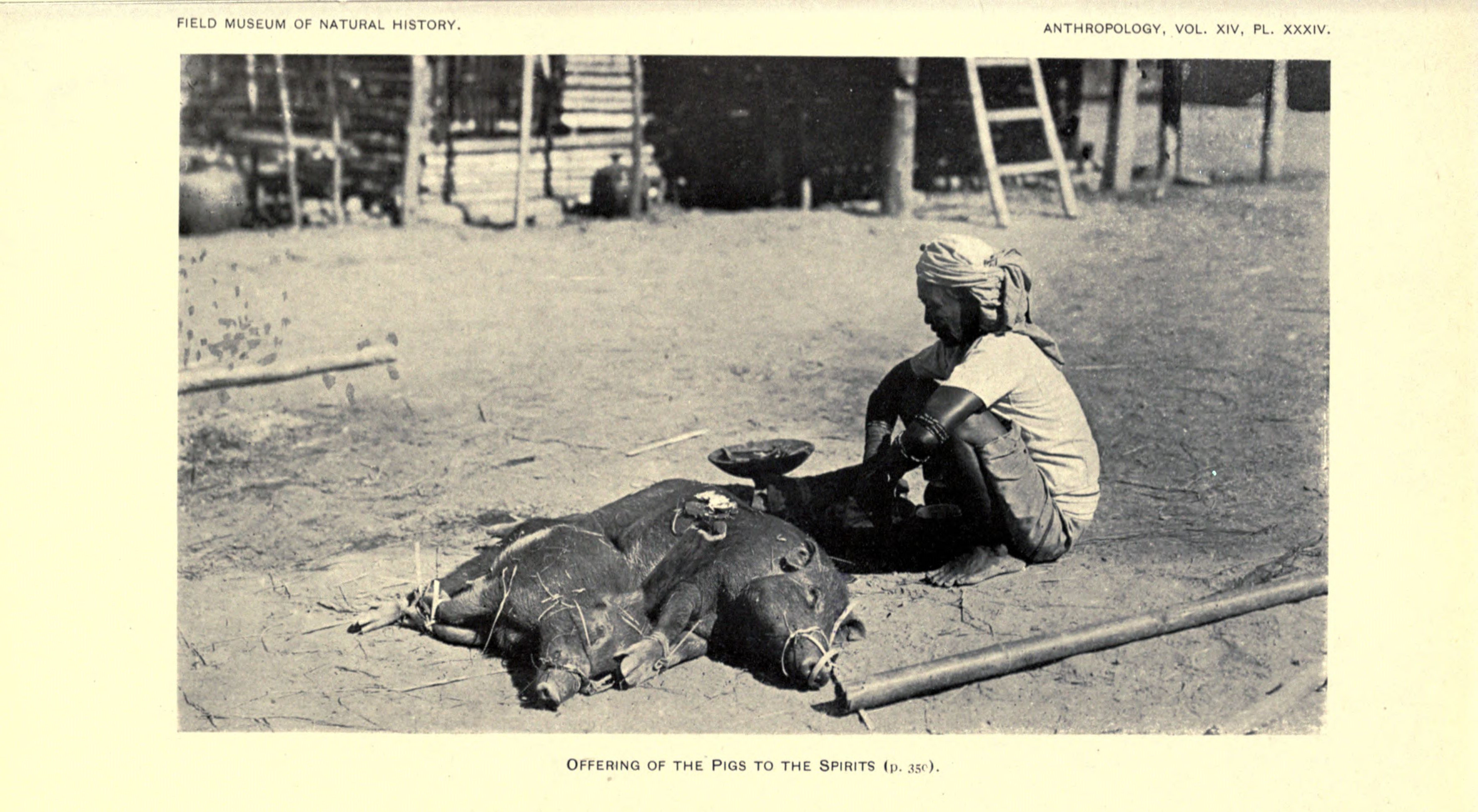
An Itneg shaman offering pigs to anito spirits, 1922

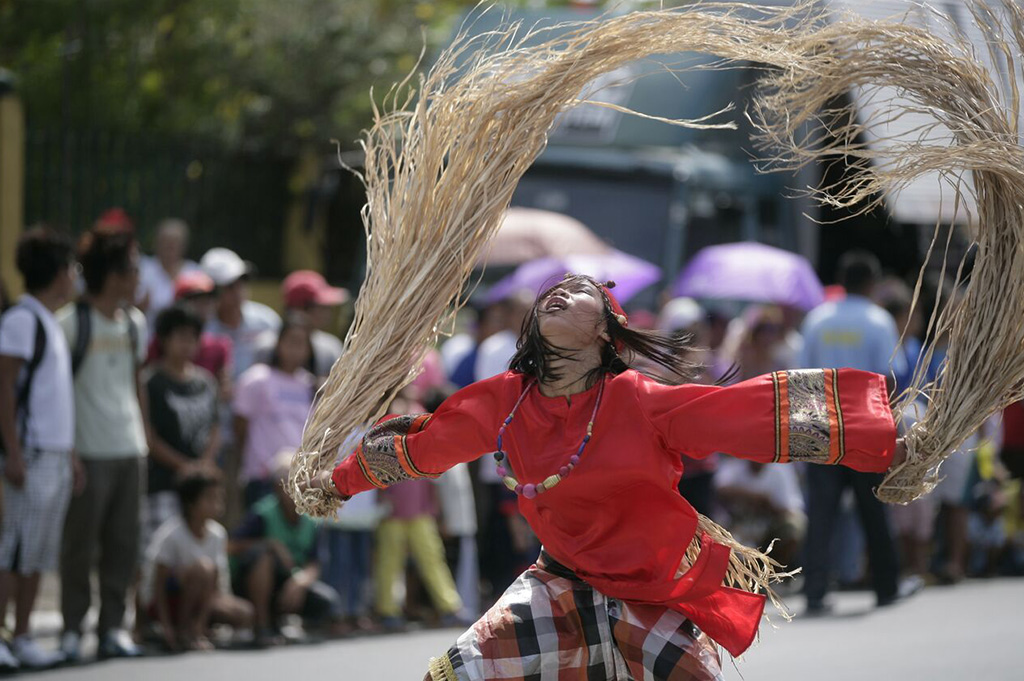
A performer depicting a babaylan (shaman)

Indigenous Philippine folk religions, also referred collectively as Anitism, meaning ancestral religions, are the original faiths of the diverse ethnic groups of the Philippines. Much of the texts of the religions are stored through memory which are traditionally chanted, rather than written in manuscripts.

Written texts, however, have been utilized as well in modern times to preserve aspects of the religions, notably their stories which are important aspects of Philippine mythology and traditional rites and other practices. These stories consist of creation stories or stories about important figures such as deities and heroes and certain creatures.

Some popular, but distinct, figures include the Tagalog's Bathala and Makiling, the Ilocano's Lam-ang, and the Maranao's Sarimanok.

=== Islam ===
Islamic mythology arrived in the Philippines in the 13th century through trade routes in Southeast Asia. The spread of Islam established a variety of belief systems, notably in the southwestern portions of the archipelago, where the sultanate system was embraced by the natives without the need for forced conversions, as the religious traders did not intended to colonize the islands. Presently, around 6% of the population are Muslims, concentrating in the Bangsamoro region in Mindanao. Most Filipino Muslims practice Sunni Islam according to the Shafi'i school.

=== Others ===
Hinduism arrived in the Philippines in 200–300 AD while Vajrayana Buddhism arrived around 900 AD. Most adherent of Hinduism have Indian origins while those practicing Buddhism have Chinese or Japanese origins, notably those who immigrated in the Philippines in the last few decades. Shintoism arrived prior to the 12th century due to Japanese traders, while Judaism arrived in the 16th century due to the Inquisition. Taoism is also practiced by some Chinese immigrants. Atheism is also found in the Philippines.

== Cuisine ==
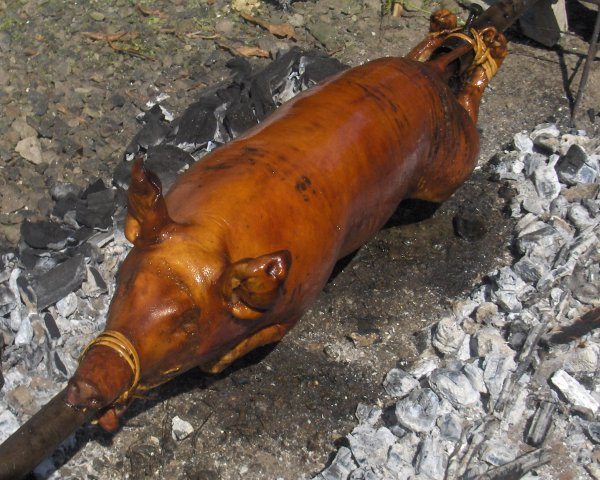
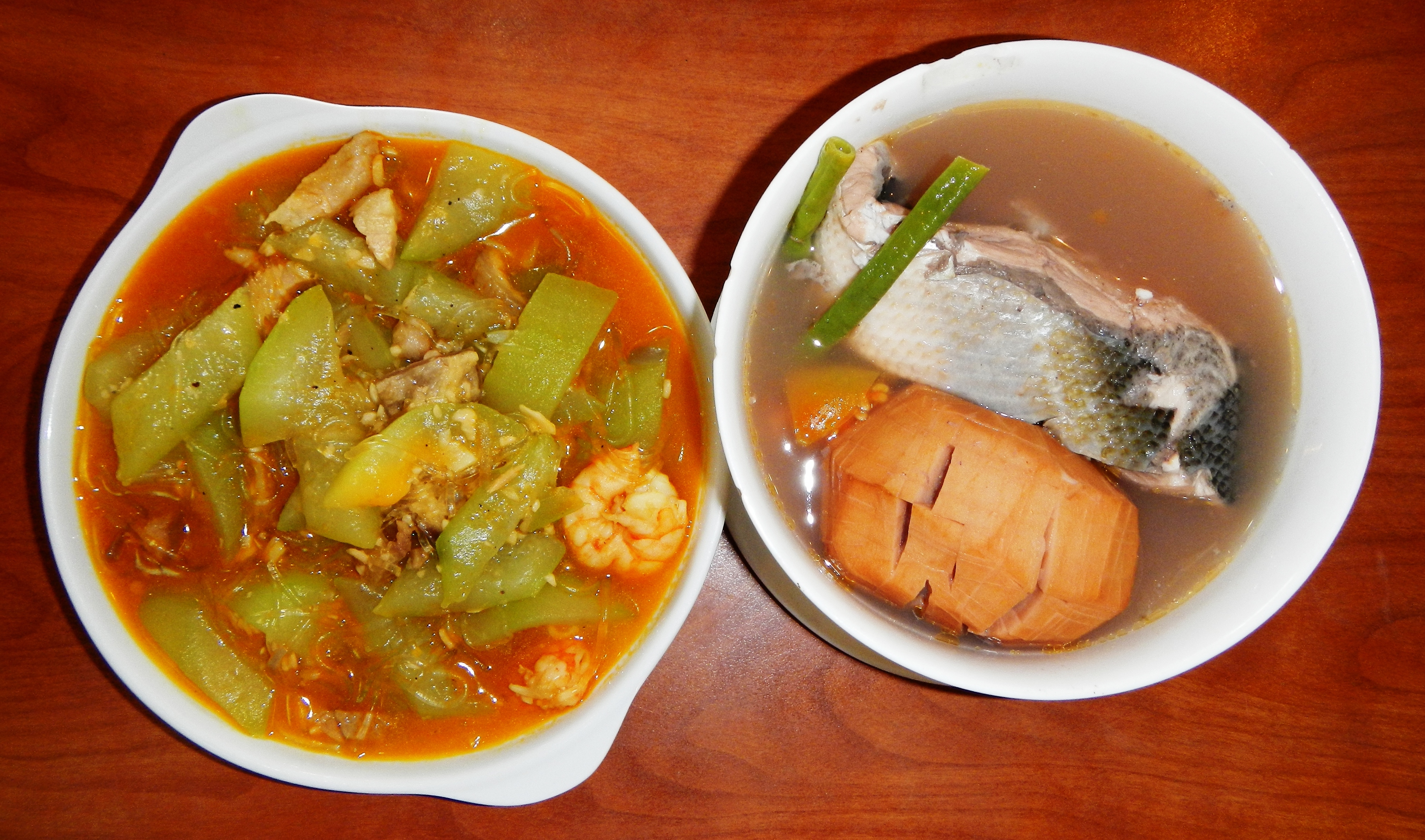
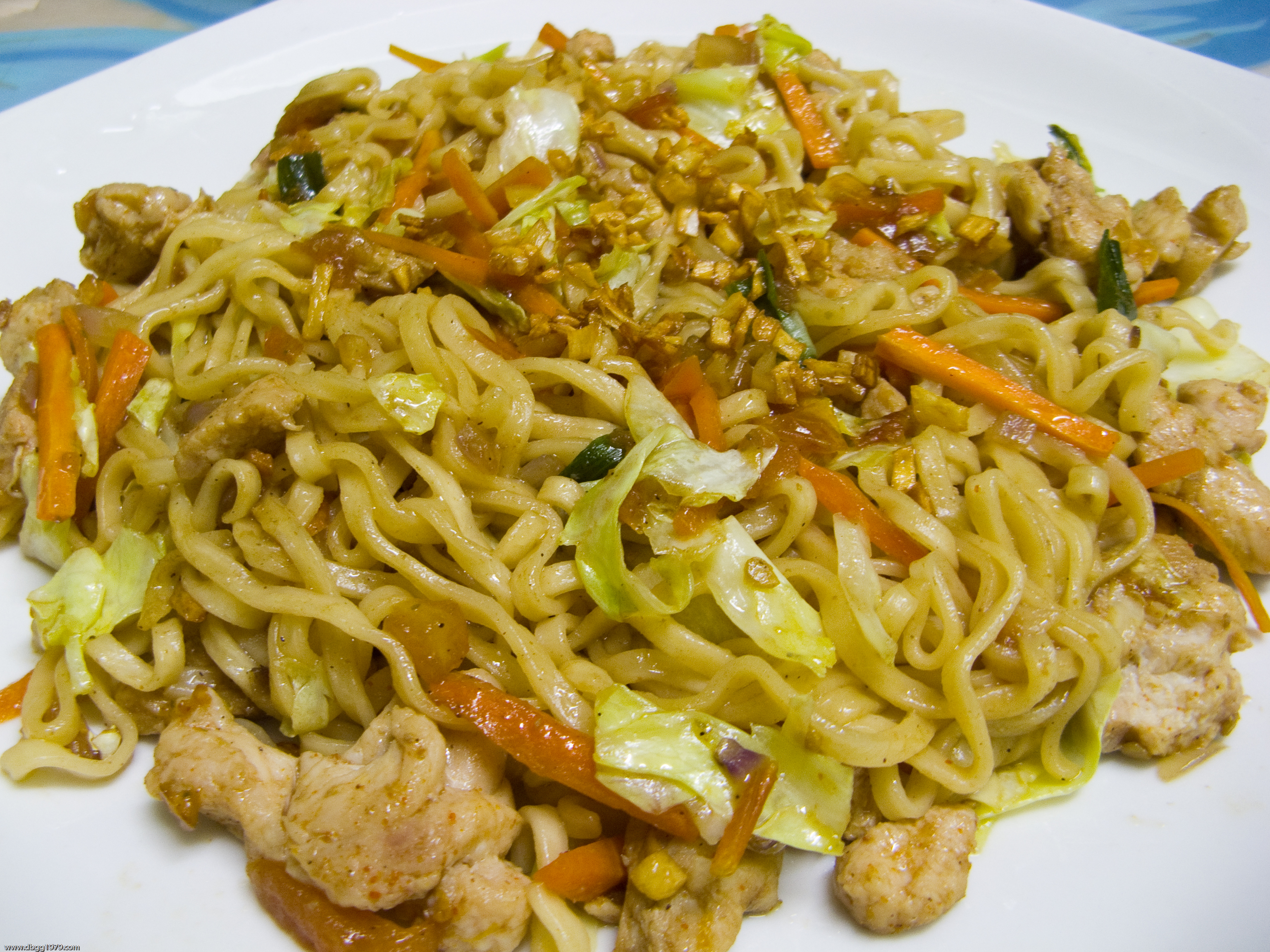
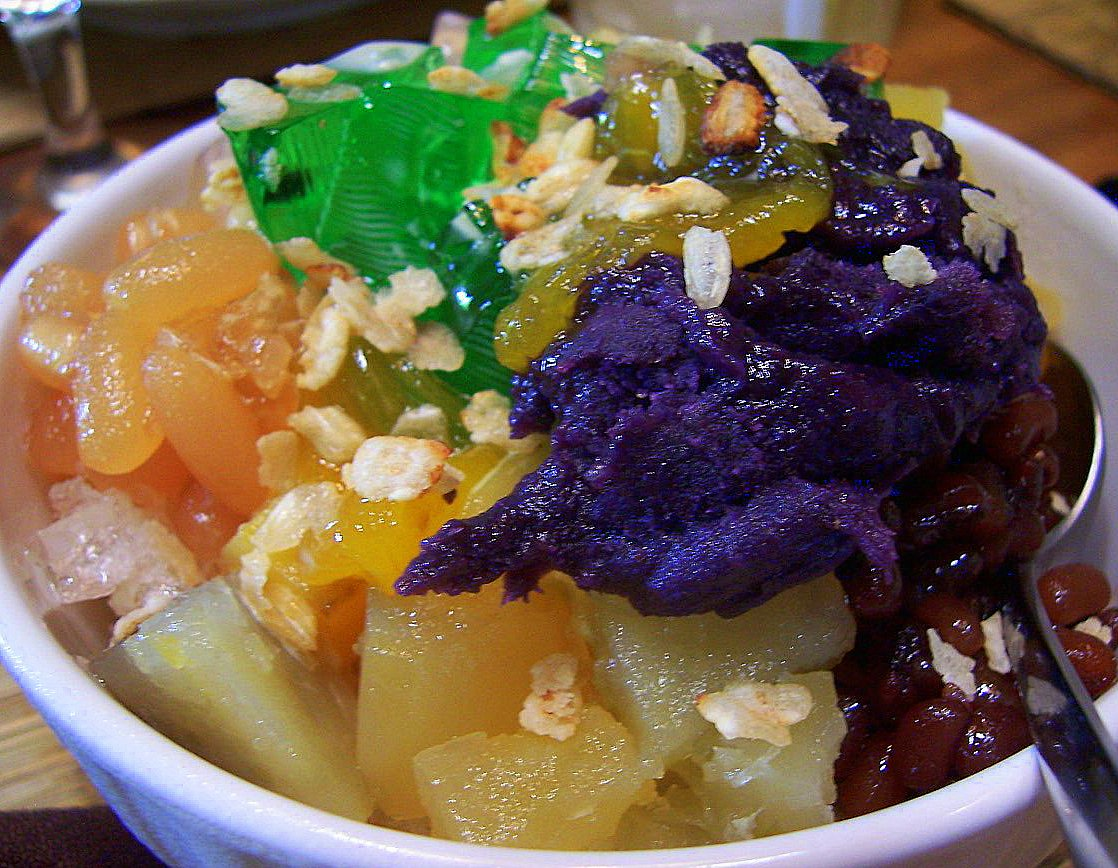
Top to bottom: Filipino lechon, sinigang, pancit, and halo-halo

Filipinos cook a variety of foods influenced by Western, Pacific Islander, and Asian cuisine. Philippine cuisine is considered as a melting pot of Indian, Chinese, Spanish, and American influences and indigenous ingredients.

The Spanish colonizers and friars in the 16th century brought with them produce from the Americas such as chili peppers, tomatoes, corn, potatoes, and the method of sautéing with garlic and onions. Eating out is a favorite Filipino pastime. A typical Pinoy diet consists at most of six meals a day; breakfast, snacks, lunch, snacks, dinner, and again a midnight snack before going to sleep. Rice is a staple in the Filipino diet, and is usually eaten together with other dishes. Filipinos regularly use spoons together with forks when eating out and when it involves eating soup like nilaga .But in traditional home settings they eat most of the time with their bare hands and also when eating seafood. Rice, corn, and popular dishes such as adobo (a meat stew made from either pork or chicken), lumpia (meat or vegetable rolls), pancit (a noodle dish), and lechón baboy (roasted pig) are served on plates.

Other popular dishes include afritada, asado, tapa, empanada, mani (roasted peanuts), paksiw (fish or pork, cooked in vinegar and water with some spices like garlic and pepper), pandesal (bread of salt), laing, sisig, torta (omelette), kare-kare (ox-tail stew), kilawen, pinakbet (vegetable stew), pinapaitan, and sinigang (tamarind soup with a variety of pork, fish, or prawns). Some delicacies eaten by some Filipinos may seem unappetizing to the Western palate include balut (boiled egg with a fertilized duckling inside), longganisa (sweet sausage), and dinuguan (soup made from pork blood).

Popular snacks and desserts such as chicharon (deep fried pork or chicken skin), halo-halo (crushed ice with evaporated milk, flan, sliced tropical fruit, and sweet beans), puto (white rice cakes), bibingka (rice cake with butter or margarine and salted eggs), ensaymada (sweet roll with grated cheese on top), pulburon (powder candy), and tsokolate (chocolate) are usually eaten outside the three main meals. Popular Filipino beverages include Beer, Tanduay Rhum, lambanog, and tuba.

Every province has its own specialty and tastes vary in each region. In Bicol, for example, foods are generally spicier than elsewhere in the Philippines. Patis (fish sauce), suka (vinegar), toyo (soy sauce), bagoong, and banana ketchup are the most common condiments found in Filipino homes and restaurants.

Western fast food chains such as McDonald's, Wendy's, KFC, and Pizza Hut are a common sight in the country. Local food chains such as Jollibee, Goldilocks Bakeshop, Mang Inasal and Chowking are also popular and have successfully competed against international fast food chains.

== Education ==
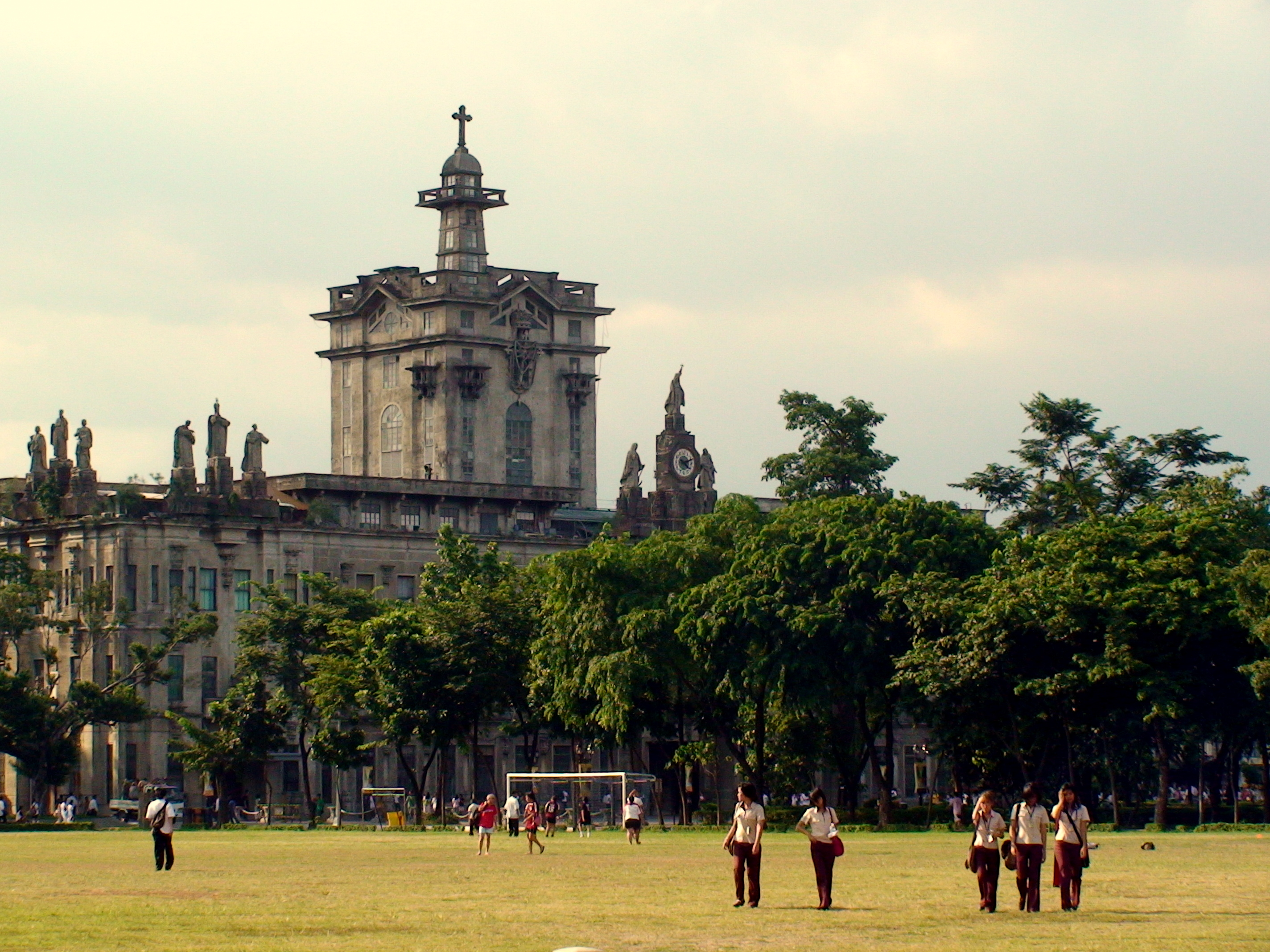
The University of Santo Tomas, located in Manila, was established in 1611

Education in the Philippines has been influenced by Western and Eastern ideology and philosophy from the United States, Spain, and its neighbouring Asian countries. Philippine students enter public school at about age four, starting from nursery school up to kindergarten. At about seven years of age, students enter elementary school (6 to 9 years) this include Grade 7 to Grade 10 as junior high school, then after, they graduate. Since the Philippines has already implemented the K-12 system, students will enter SHS or senior high school, a 2-year course, to be able to prepare college life with their chosen track such as ABM (Accountancy Business Management), STEM (Science, Technology, Engineering and Mathematics) and HUMSS (Humanities and Social Sciences) other tracks are included like TECH-VOC (Technical Vocational). Students can make a choice if they will take the college entrance examinations (CEE) in order to attend college or university (3 to 5 years) or find work after they graduate senior high school.

Other types of schools in the country include private schools, preparatory schools, international schools, laboratory high schools, and science high schools. Of these schools, private Catholic schools are the most famous. Catholic schools are preferred in the Philippines due to their religious beliefs. Most Catholic schools are co-ed. The uniforms of Catholic schools usually have an emblem along with the school colors. International schools follow different curricula, such as Singaporean, American, and British. With this, their approach differs depending on the overall programs that these curricula offer.

The school year in the Philippines starts in June and ends in March, with a two-month summer break from April to May, two-week semestral break in October and Christmas and New Year's holidays. Changes are currently being made to the system and some universities have copied the Westernized academic calendar and now start the school year in August.

In 2005, the Philippines spent about US$138 per pupil compared to US$1,582 in Singapore, US$3,728 in Japan, and US$852 in Thailand.

== Sports and recreation ==
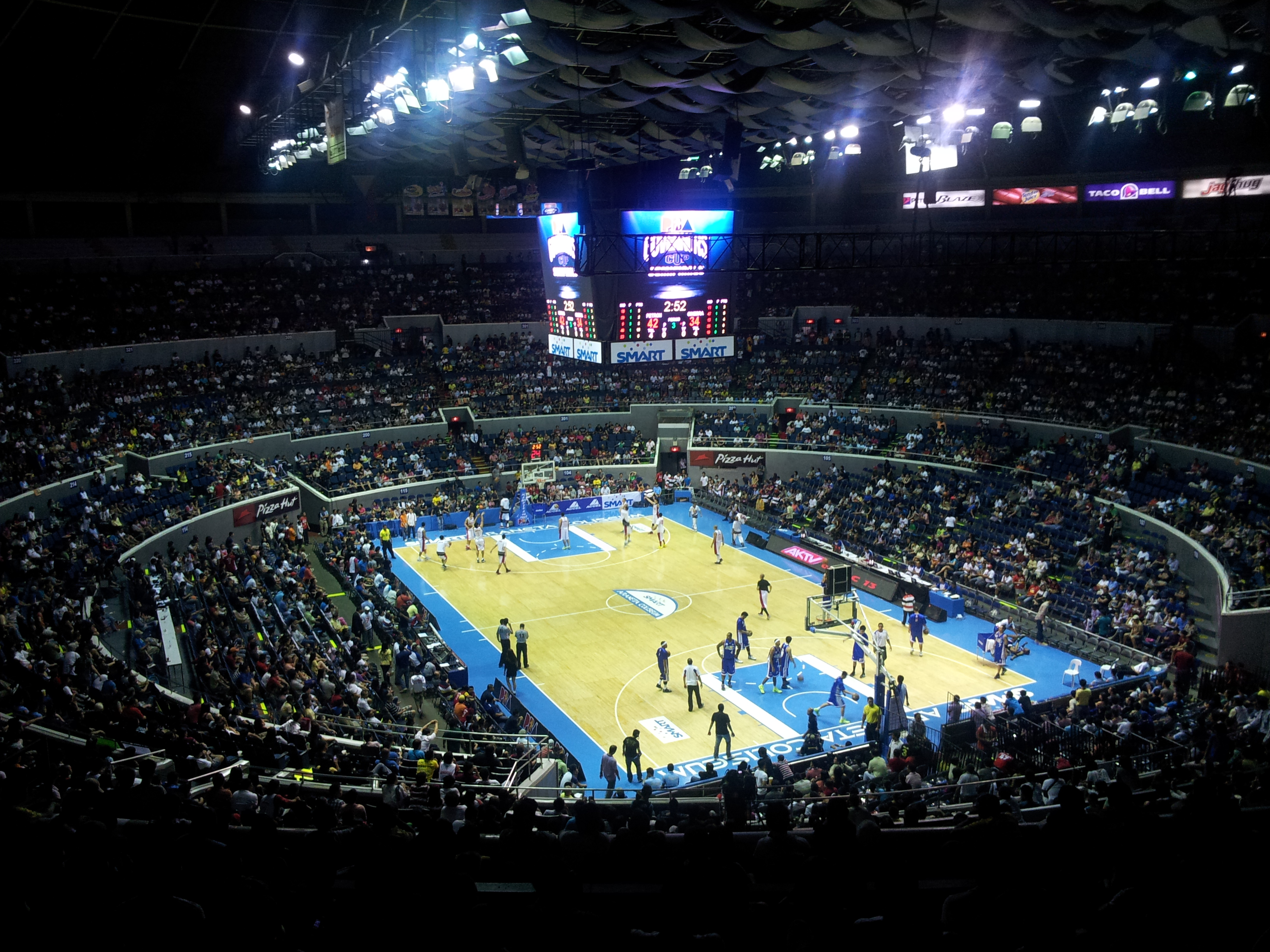
A PBA game at the Smart Araneta Coliseum

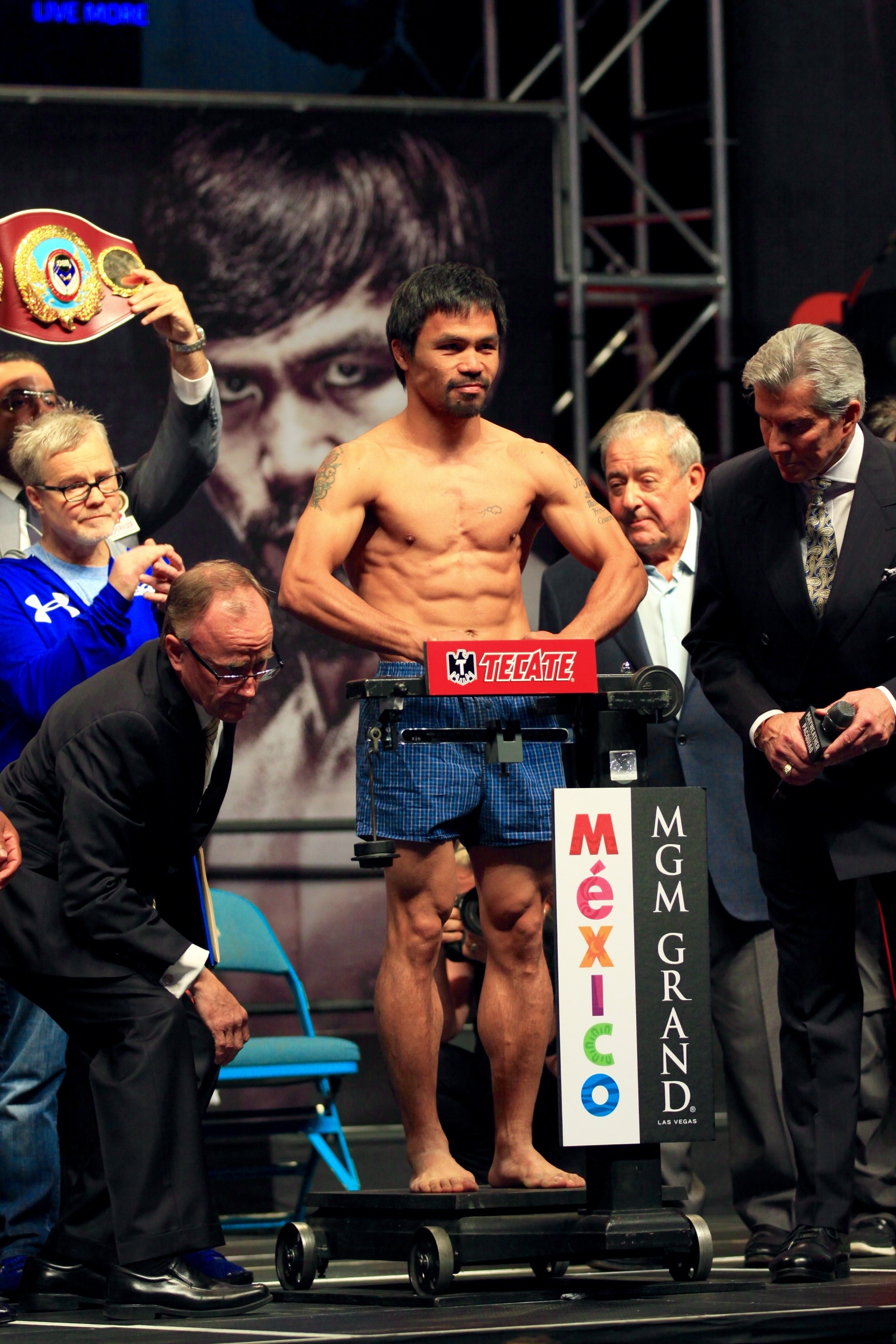
Manny Pacquiao, the only 8-division world boxing champion in history

Arnis, a form of martial arts, is the national sport in the Philippines. Among the most popular sports include basketball, boxing, football, billiards, chess, ten-pin bowling, volleyball, horse racing, Sepak Takraw, cockfighting and Bullfighting. Dodgeball, badminton, and tennis are also popular.

Filipinos have gained international success in sports. These are boxing, football, billiards, ten-pin bowling, and chess. Popular sport stars include Manny Pacquiao, Flash Elorde, and Francisco Guilledo in boxing, Paulino Alcántara in football, Carlos Loyzaga, Robert Jaworski, and Ramon Fernandez in basketball, Efren Reyes and Francisco Bustamante in billiards, Rafael Nepomuceno in ten-pin bowling, Eugene Torre and Renato Naranja in chess, and Mark Muñoz in MMA. The Philippine National Basketball Team is a powerhouse in Asia and has the best performance of all Asian teams in the Olympics and the FIBA World Cup.

The Palarong Pambansa, a national sports festival, has its origin in an annual sporting meet of public schools that started in 1948. Private schools and universities eventually joined the national event, which became known as the "Palarong Pambansa" in 1976. It serves as a national Olympic Games for students, competing at school and national level contests. The year 2002 event included football, golf, archery, badminton, baseball, chess, gymnastics, tennis, softball, swimming, table tennis, taekwondo, track and field, and volleyball.

=== Martial arts ===
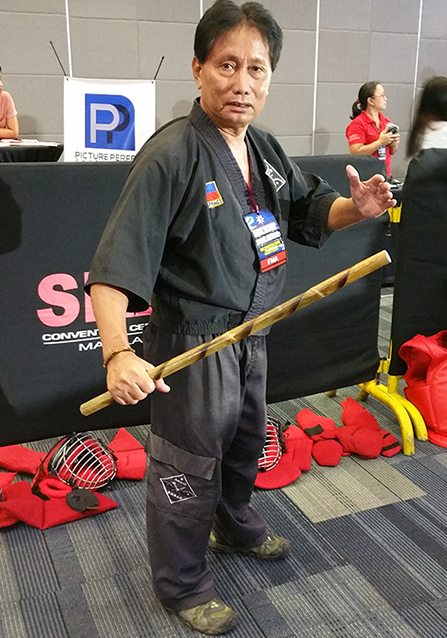
A grandmaster of Arnis

There are several forms of Filipino martial arts that originated in the Philippines (similar to how Silat is the martial arts practiced in Asia) including Eskrima (weapon-based fighting, also known as Arnis and in the West sometimes as Kali), Panantukan (empty-handed techniques), and Pananjakman (the boxing component of Filipino martial arts).

=== Traditional Filipino games and pastimes ===
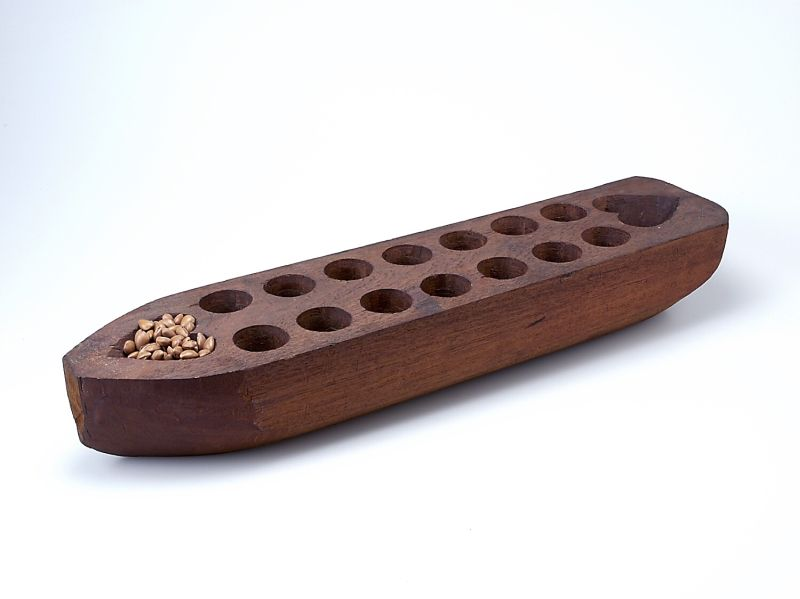
Sungka, a traditional Filipino game

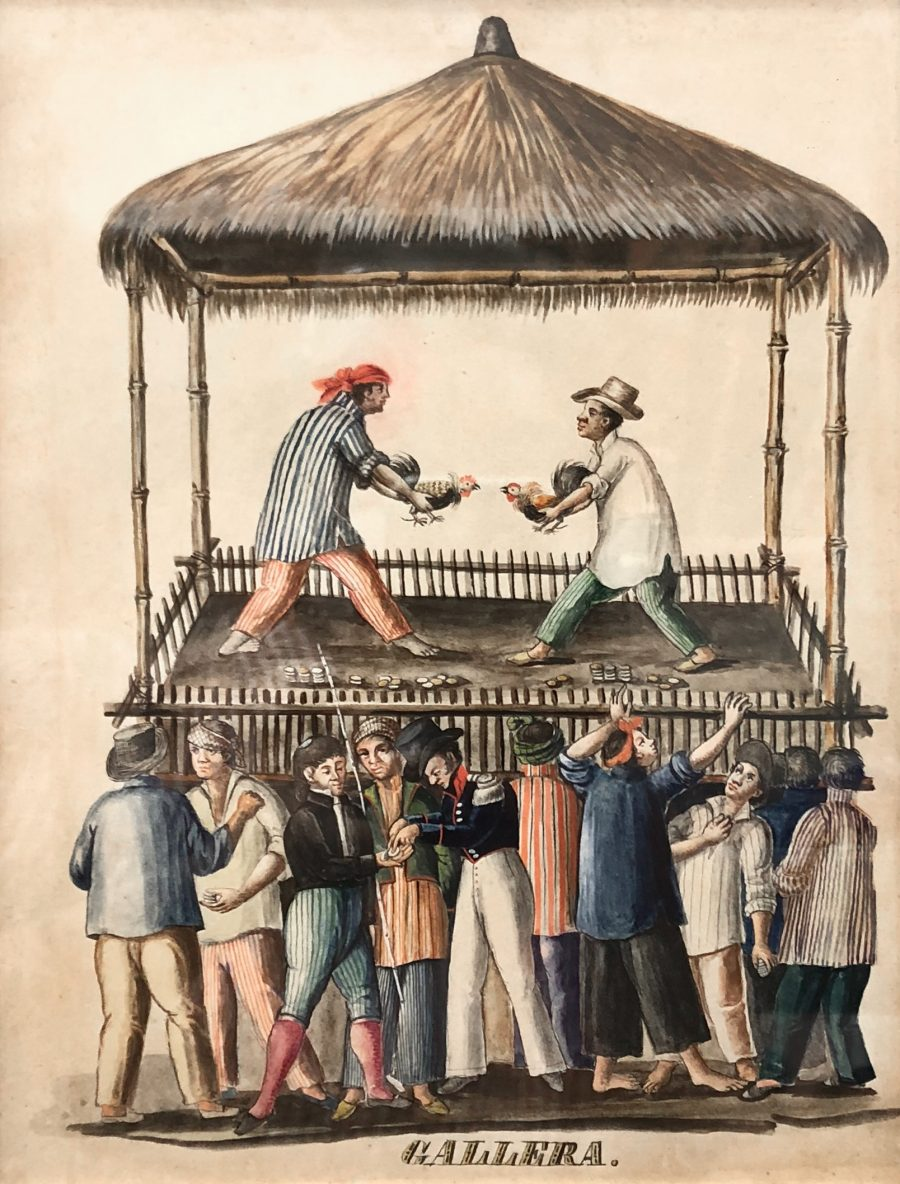
Filipinos cockfighting, circa 1800's

Traditional Philippine games such as luksong baka, patintero, piko, and tumbang preso are still played primarily as children's games among the youth. Sungka is played on a board game using small sea shells in which players try to take all shells. The winner is determined by who has the most shells at the point when all small pits become empty.

One traditional Filipino game is luksong tinik, a very popular game to Filipino children where one has to jump over the tinik and cross to the other side unscathed. Other traditional Filipino games include yo-yo, piko, patintero, bahay kubo, pusoy, and sungka. Tong-its is a popular gambling game. Individuals play the game by trying to get rid of all the cards by choosing poker hands wisely. Card games are popular during festivities, with some, including pusoy and tong-its, being used as a form of illegal gambling. Mahjong is played in some Philippine communities.

Sabong or cockfighting is another popular entertainment especially among Filipino men, and existed prior to the arrival of the Spanish. Antonio Pigafetta, Magellan's chronicler, first documented this pastime in the kingdom of Taytay.

The yo-yo, a popular toy in the Philippines, was introduced in its modern form by Pedro Flores with its name coming from the Ilocano language.

Filipinos have created toys using insects such as tying a beetle to string, and sweeping it circular rotation to make an interesting sound. The "Salagubang gong" is a toy described by Charles Brtjes, an American entomologist, who traveled to Negros and discovered a toy using beetles to create a periodic gong effect on a kerosene can as the beetle rotates above the contraption. Piko is a Filipino version of the game hopscotch. Children will draw a sequence rectangles using chalk on the ground. With various level of obstacle on each rectangle, children will compete against one another or in a team. Players use pamato; usually a flat stone, slipper or anything that could be tossed easily.

== Rites of passage ==
Every year, usually in April and May, thousands of Filipino boys are taken by their parents to be circumcised. According to the World Health Organization (WHO) about 90% of Filipino men are circumcised, one of the world's highest circumcision rates. Although the roots of the practice date back to the arrival of Islam in 1450, the succeeding 200 years of Spanish rule obviated the religious reasons for circumcision. Nevertheless, circumcision, called tuli, has persisted. The pressure to be circumcised is evidenced even in the language: the Tagalog word for 'uncircumcised', supot, also means 'coward'. It is commonly believed that a circumcised eight or ten year-old is no longer a boy and is given more adult roles in the family and society.

== Intangible cultural heritage ==
The Philippines, with the National Commission for Culture and the Arts as the de facto Ministry of Culture, ratified the 2003 Convention after its formal deposit in August 2006.

Prior to the 2003 Convention, the Philippines was invited by UNESCO to nominate intangible heritage elements for inclusion in the Proclamation of Masterpieces of the Oral and Intangible Heritage of Humanity. This prompted the proclamation of the Hudhud chant of the Ifugao in 2001 and Darangen epic chant of the Maranao in 2005. After the establishment of the 2003 Convention, all entries to the Proclamation of Masterpieces were incorporated in the Representative List of Intangible Cultural Heritage of Humanity in 2008. A third inscription was made in 2015 through a multinational nomination between Cambodia, the Philippines, the Republic of Korea and Viet Nam for the Tugging Rituals and Games, wherein the Punnuk, tugging ritual of the Ifugao was included.

As part of the objective of the 2003 Convention, the National Commission for Culture and the Arts through the Intangible Cultural Heritage unit and in partnership with the Intangible Cultural Heritage in the Asia-Pacific Region (ICHCAP), published the "Pinagmulan: Enumeration from the Philippine Inventory of Intangible Cultural Heritage" in 2012. The publication contains an initial inventory of 335 ICH elements with elaborate discussions on 109 ICH elements. The elements listed are the first batch of continuous updating process initiated by the government, UNESCO, and other stakeholders. In 2014, the Pinagmulan was a finalist under the category of the Elfren S. Cruz Prize for Best Book in the Social Sciences to the National Book Awards organized by the National Book Development Board. The Philippine inventory is currently being updated as a measure to safeguard more intangible cultural heritage elements in the country. The updating began in 2013 and results may be released in 5–10 years after the scientific process finishes the second batch of element documentations. According to UNESCO, it is not expected by a country or state party to have a completed inventory. On the contrary, the development and updating of inventories is an ongoing process that can never be finished.

Between 2015 and 2017, UNESCO's Intangible Cultural Heritage Courier of Asia and the Pacific featured the darangen epic chant, punnuk tugging ritual, and at least three kinds of traditional healing practices in the Philippines, including the manghihilot and albularyo healing practices and belief of buhay na tubig (living water) of the Tagalog people of 20th century Quezon city, the baglan and mandadawak healing practices and stone beliefs of the Itneg people in Abra, and the mantatawak healing practices of the Tagalog people of Marinduque.

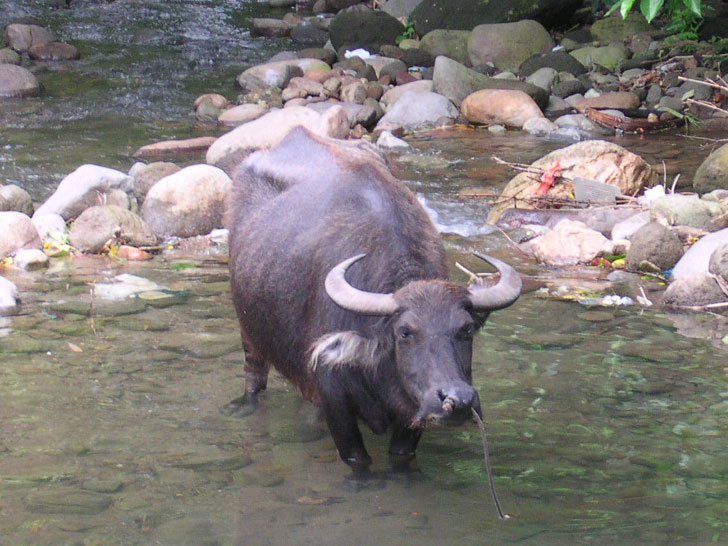
Carabao is a major symbol of Filipinos hard labor. And is known to be the "Filipino farmer's bestfriend".

By 2016, according to the ICH Unit, National Commission for Culture and the Arts, there were 367 elements listed under the Philippine Inventory of Intangible Cultural Heritage (PIICH), the official ICH inventory of the Philippines. All elements under the PIICH are listed in Philippine Registry of Cultural Property (PRECUP), the official cultural property inventory of the country which includes both tangible and intangible cultural properties. In April 2018, the buklog of the Subanen people was nominated by the National Commission for Culture and the Arts in the list for urgent safeguarding.

== Filipino diaspora ==
An Overseas Filipino is a person of Filipino origin, who lives outside of the Philippines. This term is applied to people of Filipino ancestry, who are citizens or residents of a different country. Often, these Filipinos are referred to as Overseas Filipino Workers.

There are about 11 million overseas Filipinos living worldwide, equivalent to about 11 percent of the total population of the Philippines.

Each year, thousands of Filipinos migrate to work abroad through overseas employment agencies and other programs. Other individuals emigrate and become permanent residents of other nations. Overseas Filipinos often work as doctors, nurses, accountants, IT professionals, engineers, architects, entertainers, technicians, teachers, military servicemen, students, caregivers, domestic helpers, and household maids.

International employment includes an increasing number of skilled Filipino workers taking on unskilled work overseas, resulting in what has been referred to as brain drain, particularly in the health and education sectors. Also, the employment can result in underemployment, for example, in cases where doctors undergo retraining to become nurses and other employment programs.

== Festivals ==
Festivals in the Philippines, locally known as fiestas, originated dating back to the Spanish colonial period when the Spaniards introduced Christianity to the country. Most Philippine towns and cities has a patron saint assigned to each of them. Fiestas in the Philippines serve as either religious, cultural, or both. These festivals are held to honor the patron saint or to commemorate history and culture, such as promoting local products and celebrate a bountiful harvest. Fiestas can be categorized by Holy Masses, processions, parades, theatrical play and reenactments, religious or cultural rituals, trade fairs, exhibits, concerts, pageants and various games and contests.

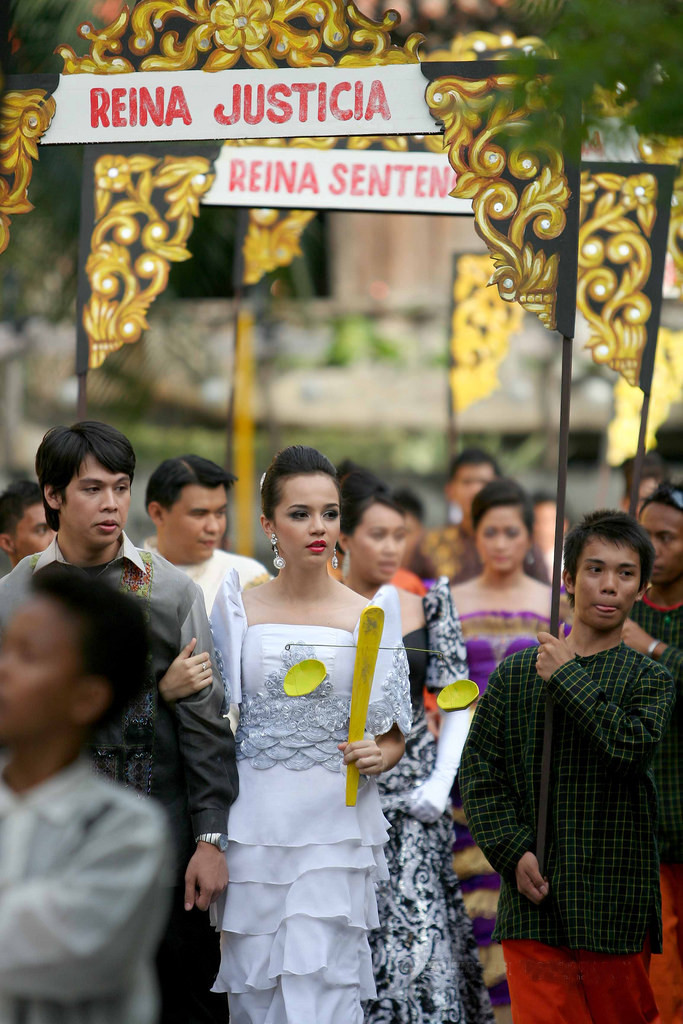
Flores de Mayo

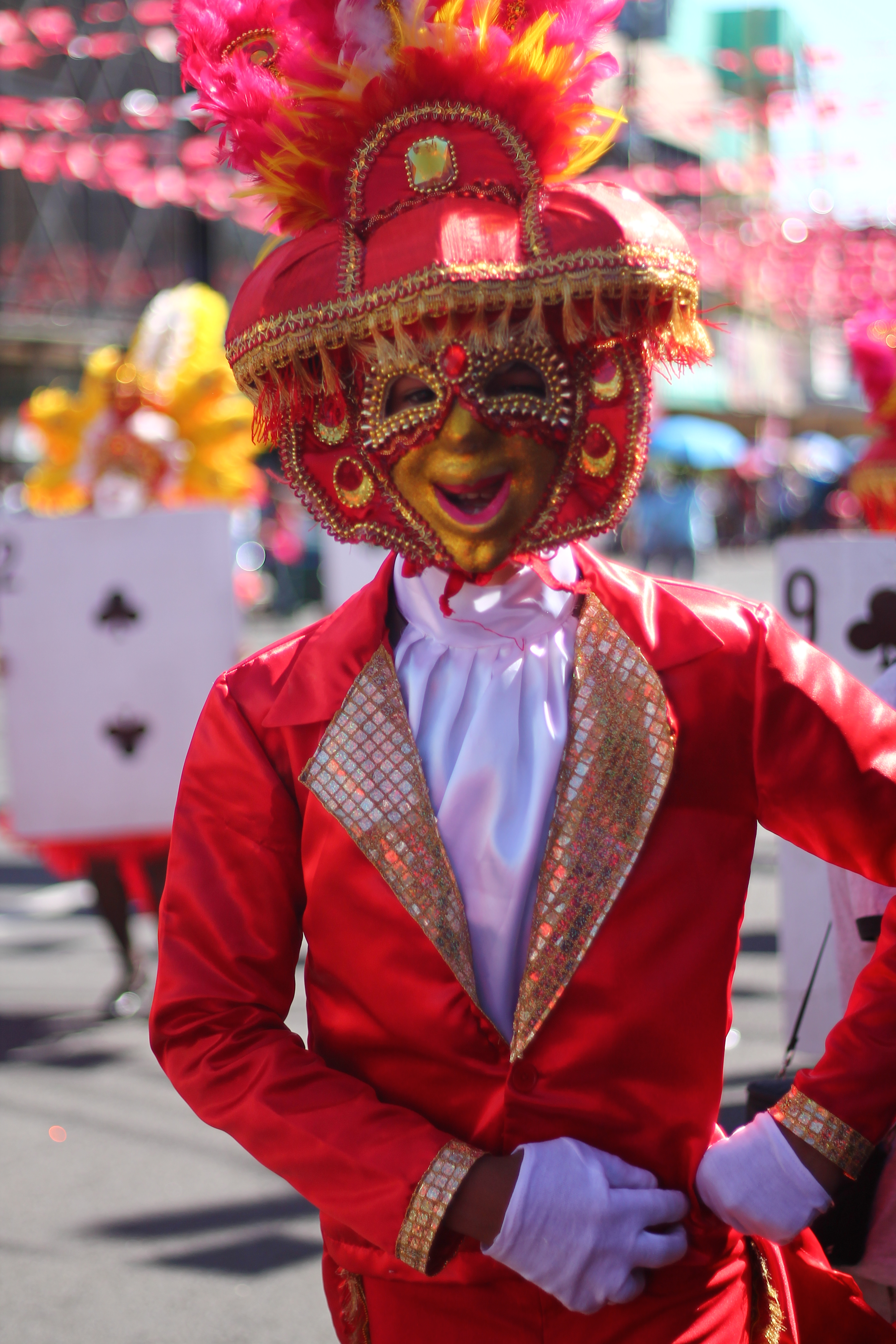
The MassKara Festival of Bacolod.

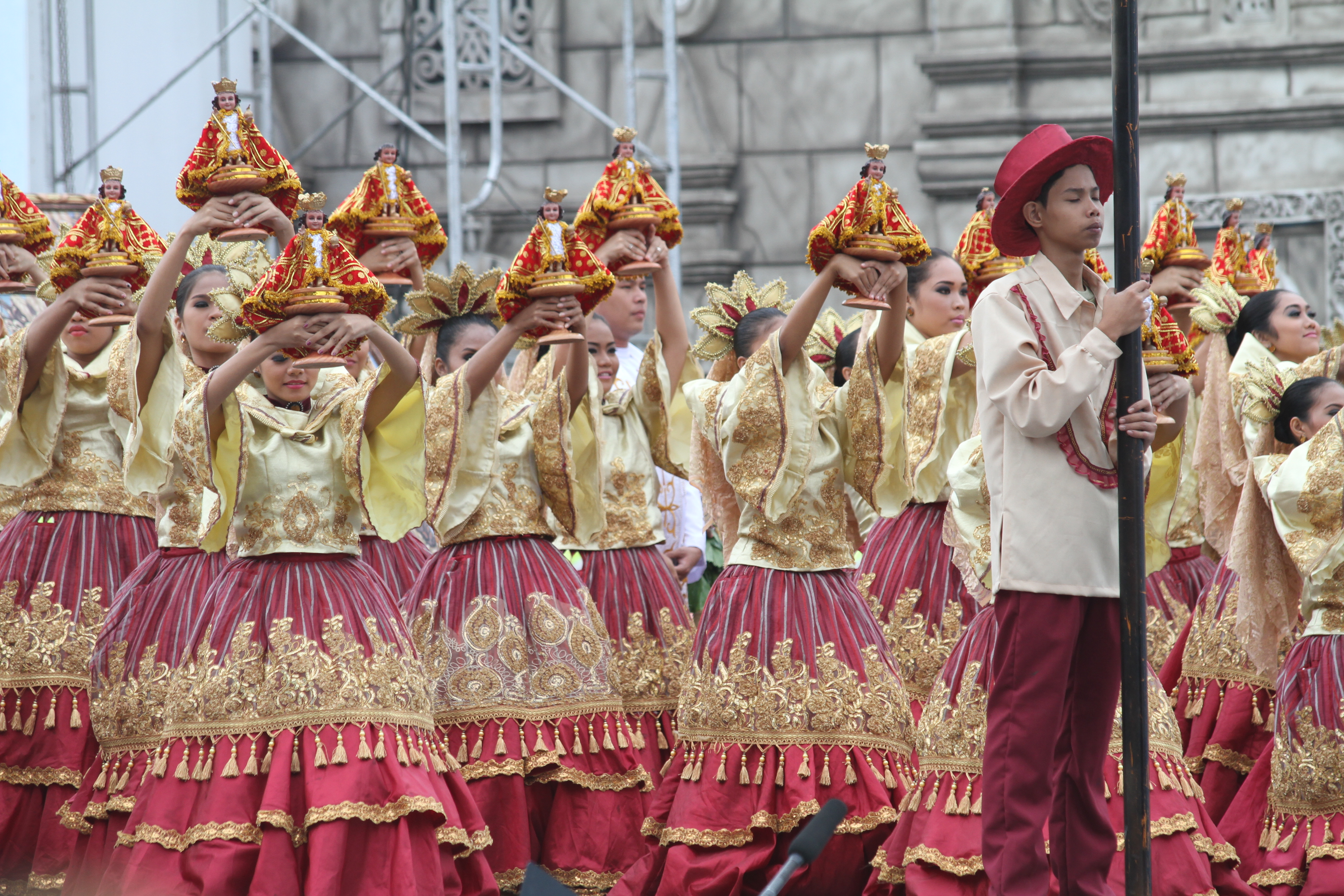
The Sinulog Festival is held by the Cebuanos to commemorate the Santo Niño.

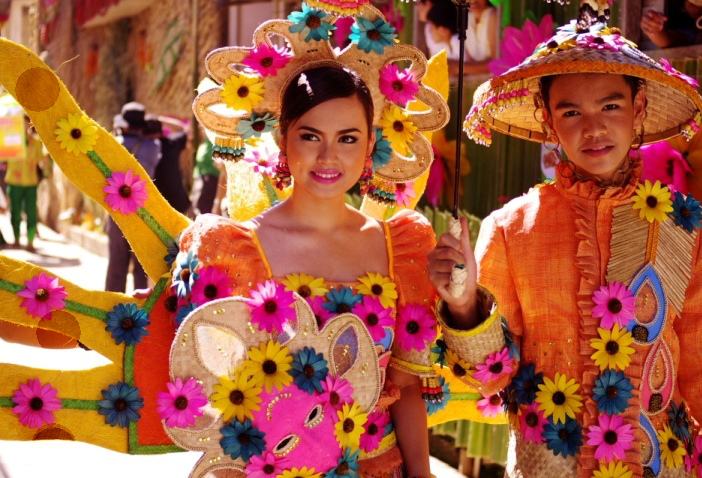
Pahiyas Festival in Lucban Quezon

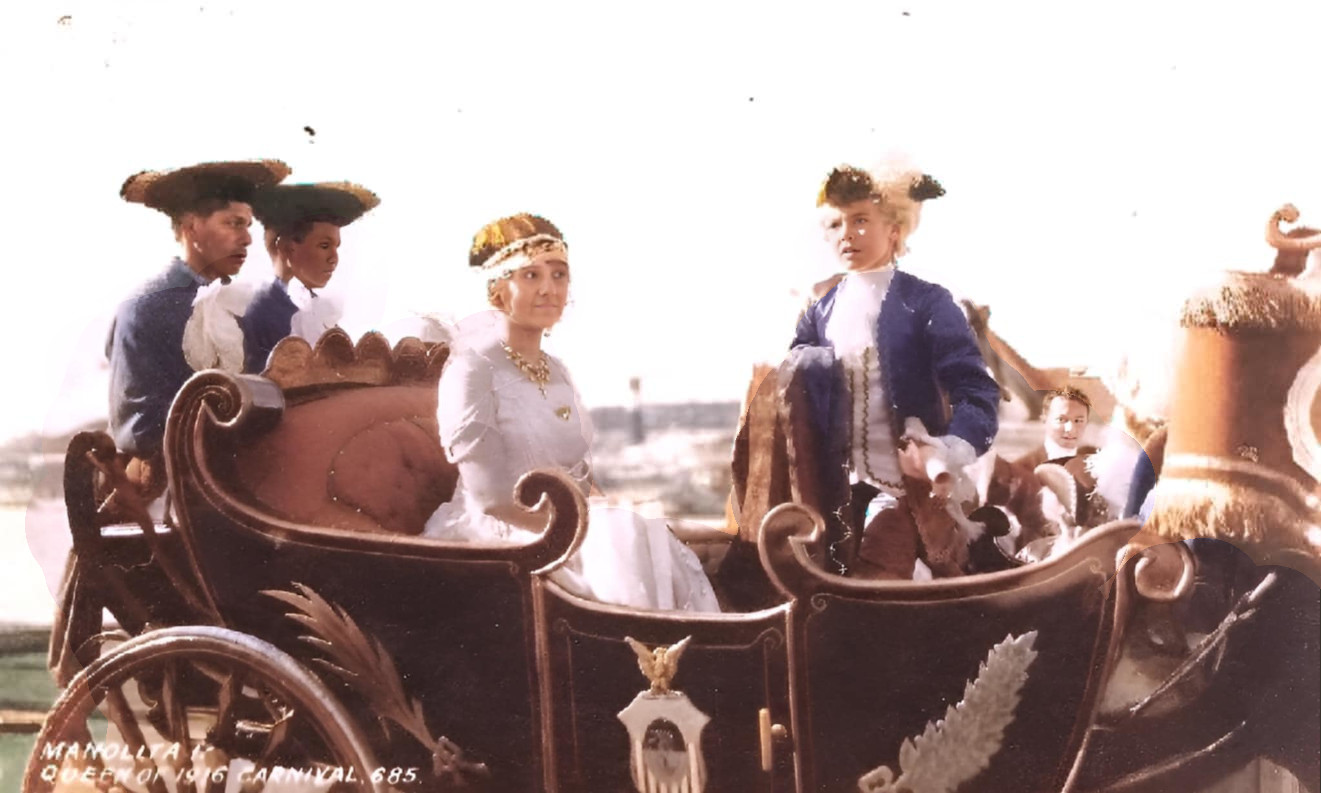
The Manila Carnival was a very important festival during the American era of the Philippines. Although it doesn't exist anymore, its legacy still influence modern Philippine pageantries.

== Holidays ==
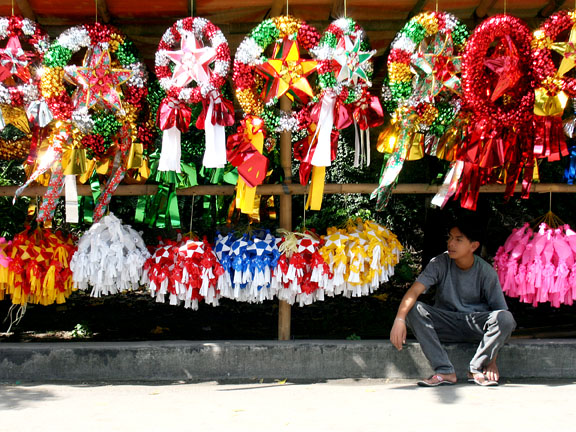
Parol (Christmas lanterns) being sold during the Christmas season

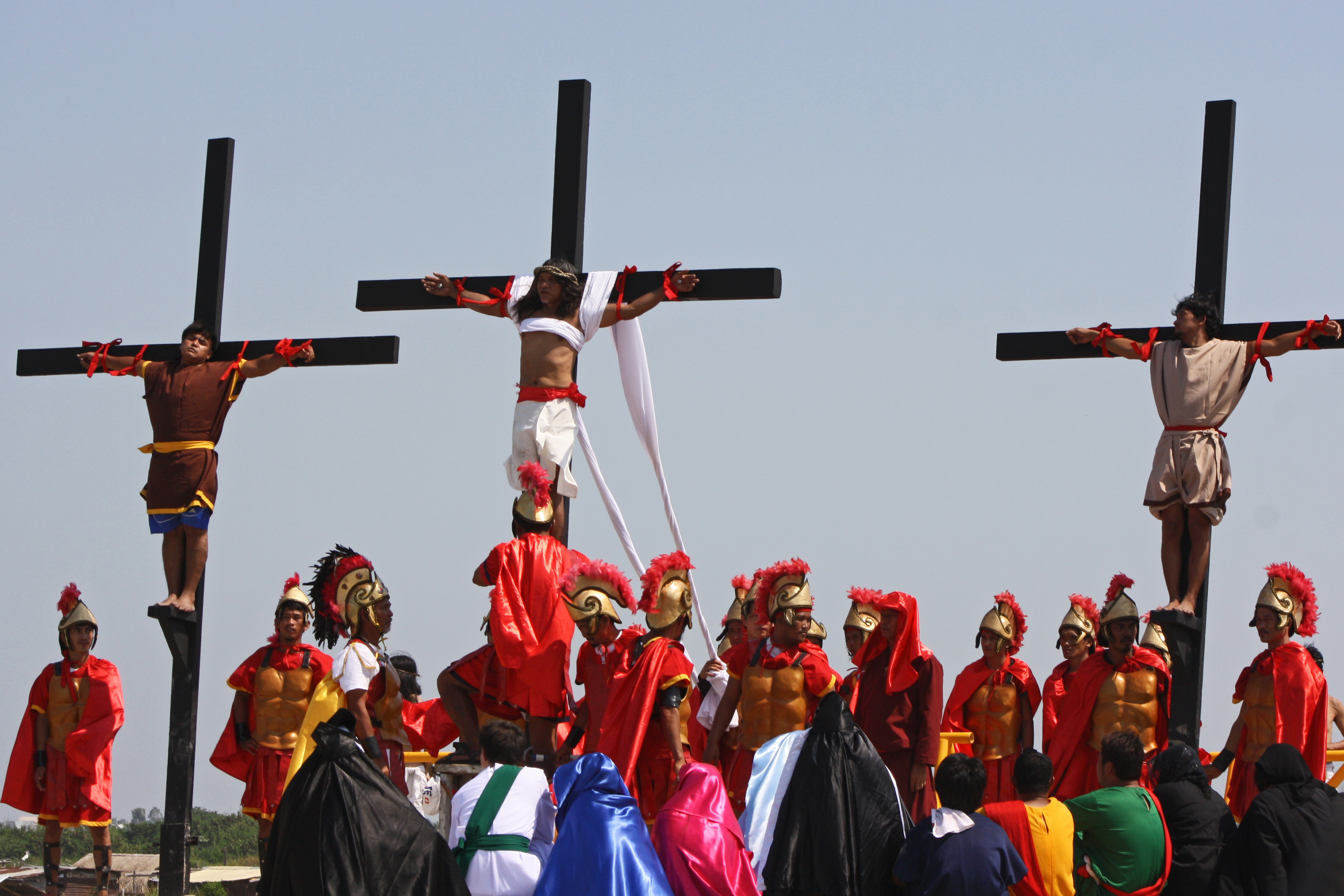
Good Friday observance in Pampanga

=== Regular holidays ===
Date (Gregorian Calendar)	Filipino language	English language
January 1	Araw ng Bagong Taon	New Year's Day
March–April	Mahal na Araw including Biyernes Santo and Huwebes Santo	Holy Week including Good Friday and Maundy Thursday
April 9	Araw ng Kagitingan	Day of Valour
May 1	Araw ng Manggagawa	Labour Day
June 12	Araw ng Kalayaan	Independence Day
August 27	Araw ng mga Bayani	National Heroes' Day
November 30	Araw ni Bonifacio	Bonifacio Day
December 24	Bisperás ng Pasko	Christmas Eve
December 25	Araw ng Pasko	Christmas
December 30	Araw ni Rizal	Rizal Day

=== Special holidays ===
Date (Gregorian Calendar)	Filipino language	English language
January–February	Bagong Taong Pang Tsino	Chinese New Year
February 25	Anibersaryo ng Rebolusyon ng Lakas ng mga Tao	People Power Revolution Anniversary
August 21	Araw ni Ninoy Aquino	Ninoy Aquino Day
November 1	Araw ng mga Santo	All Saints Day
November 2	Araw ng mga Kaluluwa	All Souls' Day
December 31	Bisperás ng Bagong Taón	New Year's Eve

== Heritage towns and cities ==
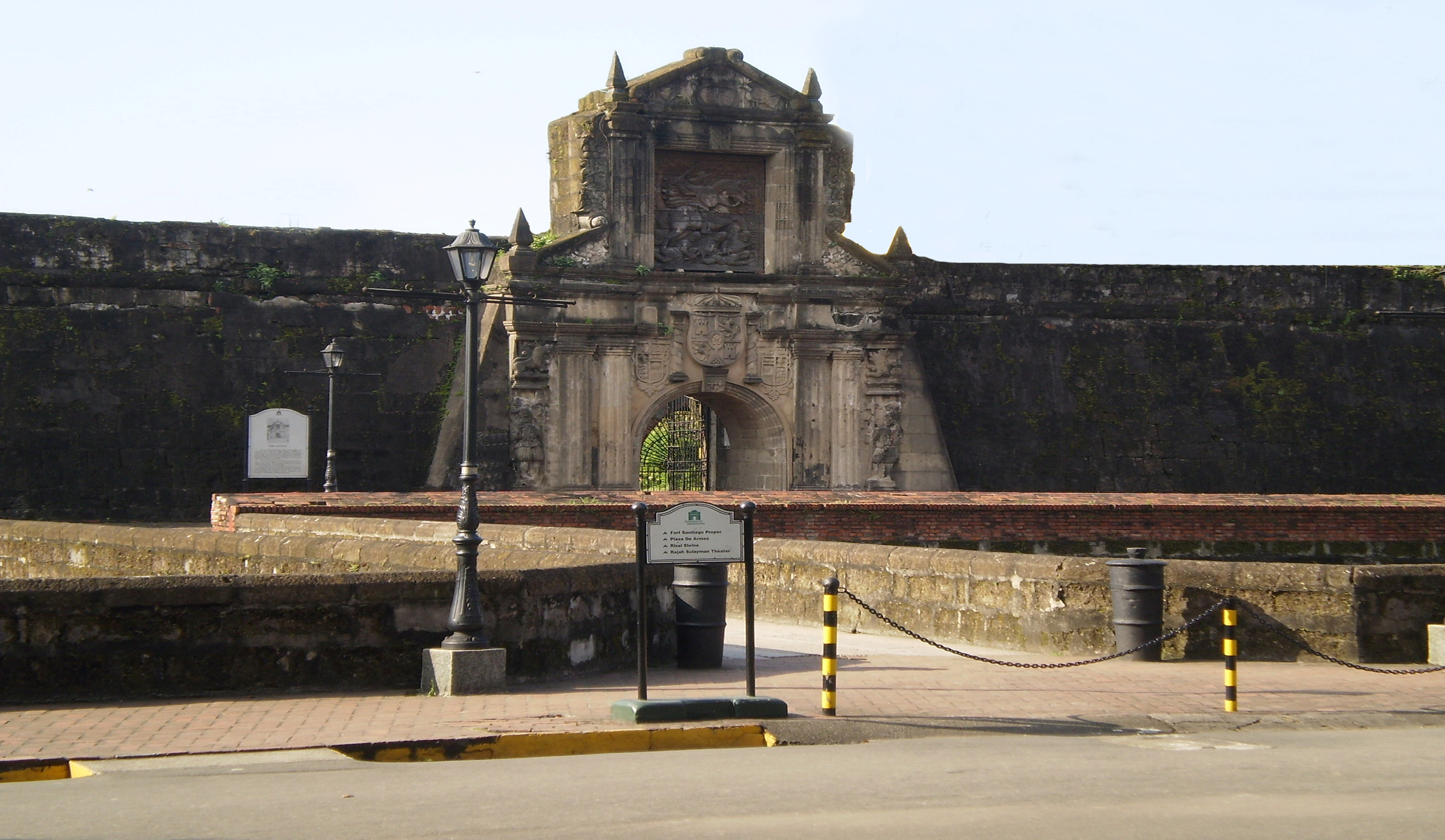
Fort Santiago in Intramuros, Manila.

The Philippines is home to numerous heritage towns and cities, many of which have been intentionally destroyed by the Japanese through fire tactics in World War II and the Americans through bombings during the same war. After the war, the government of the Empire of Japan withheld from giving funds to the Philippines for the restoration of the heritage towns they destroyed, effectively destroying any chances of restoration since the pre-war Philippines' economy was devastated and had limited monetary supply. On the other hand, the United States gave minimal funding for only two of the hundreds of cities they destroyed, namely, Manila and Baguio.

Today, only the centres (poblacion or downtown areas) of Filipino heritage towns and cities remain in most of the expansive heritage cities and towns in the country. Yet, some heritage cities in their former glory prior to the war still exist, such as the UNESCO city of Vigan which was the only heritage town saved from American bombing and Japanese fire and kamikaze tactics. The country currently lacks a city/town-singular architectural style law. Due to this, unaesthetic cement or shanty structures have taken over heritage buildings annually, destroying many former heritage townscapes. Some heritage buildings have been demolished or sold to corporations, and have been replaced by commercial structures such as shopping centers, condominium units, or newly furnished modern-style buildings, completely destroying the old aesthetics of many former heritage towns and cities. This is one of the reasons why UNESCO has repeatedly withheld from inscribing further Filipino heritage towns in the World Heritage List since 1999. Only the heritage city of Vigan has a town law that guarantees its singular architecture (the Vigan colonial style) shall always be used in constructions and reconstructions.

While Silay, Iloilo City, and San Fernando de Pampanga have ordinances giving certain tax exemptions to owners of heritage houses. In 2010, the Philippine Cultural Heritage Act passed into law, effectively giving protections to all cultural heritage properties of the Philippines. However, despite its passage, many ancestral home owners continue to approve the demolition of ancestral structures. In certain cases, government entities themselves were the purveyors of such demolitions.

== See also ==
- Art of the Philippines
- List of museums in the Philippines
