= Gabriel Fabella =

Filipino historian

The Honourable Gabriel Fabella
- Photo of Fabella from his autobiography The Man from Romblon

Member of the Philippine National Assembly from the Romblon's Lone District
- In office November 25, 1935 – August 15, 1938
- President: Manuel Quezon
- Preceded by: Leonardo Festin (as Representative)
- Succeeded by: Leonardo Festin

Personal details
- Born: Gabriel Fabrero Fabella; March 18, 1898 Banton, Romblon, Capiz, Captaincy General of the Philippines
- Died: January 29, 1982 (aged 83) Manila, Philippines
- Party: Nacionalista
- Education: University of the Philippines Manila (BA, BS, HSTC, MA); University of Manila (LLB)
- Occupation: Historian; Assemblyman
- Profession: Lawyer

Gabriel Fabrero Fabella (July 18, 1898 – January 29, 1982) was a prominent Filipino historian during the 20th century. He is primarily known as the historian behind Philippine President Diosdado Macapagal's decision to issue Proclamation No. 28 on May 12, 1962, which changed the date of Philippine independence from July 4, 1946 to June 12, 1898 – the date when Philippine President Emilio Aguinaldo proclaimed the country's independence from Spain in Kawit, Cavite. For this achievement, Fabella became known as the "Father of June 12 Independence Day."

Fabella was also the founder and first president of the Philippine Historical Association, the pioneer professional association of historians in the Philippines.

== Early life and education ==
Fabella was born in the island municipality of Banton in Romblon, then a sub-province under Capiz, on March 18, 1898, to Maximo Fabella, a coconut and tobacco merchant, and Rafaela Fabrero, a housewife. He is 10th among the couple's 13 children. At the time, Banton was an isolated municipality halfway between Marinduque and the main island of Romblon. As such, he and his family grew up in abject poverty. He received elementary education at Banton Primary School and Romblon Intermediate School. To augment his monthly stipend of ₱3 to ₱4 from Banton, Fabella worked as a store helper for a local Filipino-Chinese merchant.

For his secondary education, Fabella studied at Manila High School in Intramuros, Manila with the support of his brothers Apolonio and Jorge who already lived there and are working as calesa drivers. To help his brothers in sending him to school, he sold newspapers every Friday and Saturday and polished shoes at Puerta del Parian. He also helped his sister-in-law in selling food to calesa drivers in the Port Area. He finished high school in 1916. Among his high school batchmates include Julio Nalundasan and Carlos P. Romulo.

Poverty forced Fabella to postpone his plan to pursue his college studies. Instead, he worked as an elementary school teacher at Capiz Intermediate School from June 1916 to March 1917. After saving enough money from his salary, he went back to Manila and enrolled at the University of the Philippines Manila. From 1917 to 1920, he completed three courses in the university: Bachelor of Arts (BA), Bachelor of Science in Education (BSE) and High School Teachers' Certificate (HSTC). He was the first person from Banton to finish both high school and college and the first to have a triple degree. In 1931, Fabella graduated from UP with a degree in Master of Arts in History, thus becoming the first person from Banton to have postgraduate education. In 1934, Fabella completed his Bachelor of Laws degree at the University of Manila and passed the Philippine Bar Examination that same year.

== Career ==
=== As history instructor ===
After finishing college, Fabella taught at Romblon High School from 1920 to 1922 and then at Tayabas High School in Lucena, Tayabas (now Quezon) from 1922 to 1923. That year, he received an offer from UP Department of History chairperson Dr. Leandro Fernandez to become a history instructor at the university. His first teaching service at UP lasted 11 years, serving alongside other prominent Filipino historians like Gregorio F. Zaide, Encarnacion Alzona and Nicolas Zafra. Among his notable students include would-be dictator Philippine President Ferdinand Marcos.

While teaching at UP, he also completed his master's degree in history at the school and his law degree at the University of Manila. During the same period, he wrote for Iwag it Kaanduan, Romblon's first vernacular newspaper and established his own newspaper Bag-ong Iwag in 1926. Due to his educational achievements, Fabella was well known in Romblon and was active in various organizations such as Katipunang Bantoanon, Romblomanian Association, Banton Uplift Club and Romblon Youth.

Following budget cuts brought about by the Great Depression, Fabella was among several instructors let go by the university in 1934.

=== Political career ===
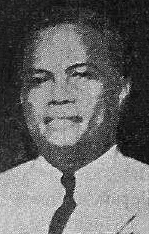
Fabella in 1939

As early as 1922, Fabella showed desire to enter politics to challenge the incumbent Leonardo Festin, who has been representative for the lone seat of Romblon in the National Assembly since 1916. Following the end of his first teaching service in UP in 1934, Fabella joined the Partido Nacionalista Democratico and ran against Festin during the 1935 Philippine general elections. He won against Festin with a lead of 356 votes despite the lack of funding and campaigning throughout the province for only 24 days.

Fabella served as Romblon's assemblyman for three years from November 25, 1935 to August 15, 1938. During that time, he became a member of various committees in the National Assembly, namely Public Instruction, Public Services, Civil Service, Codes, Internal Government, Privileges at Navigation. He also appropriated 80 percent of his pork barrel to building schools in Romblon, while the remaining 20 percent was appropriated to construction and repair of roads in the province.

Following the end of term in 1938, Fabella did not seek reelection and returned to teaching instead at the University of the Philippines. He was succeeded by Festin.

== Father of June 12 Independence Day ==
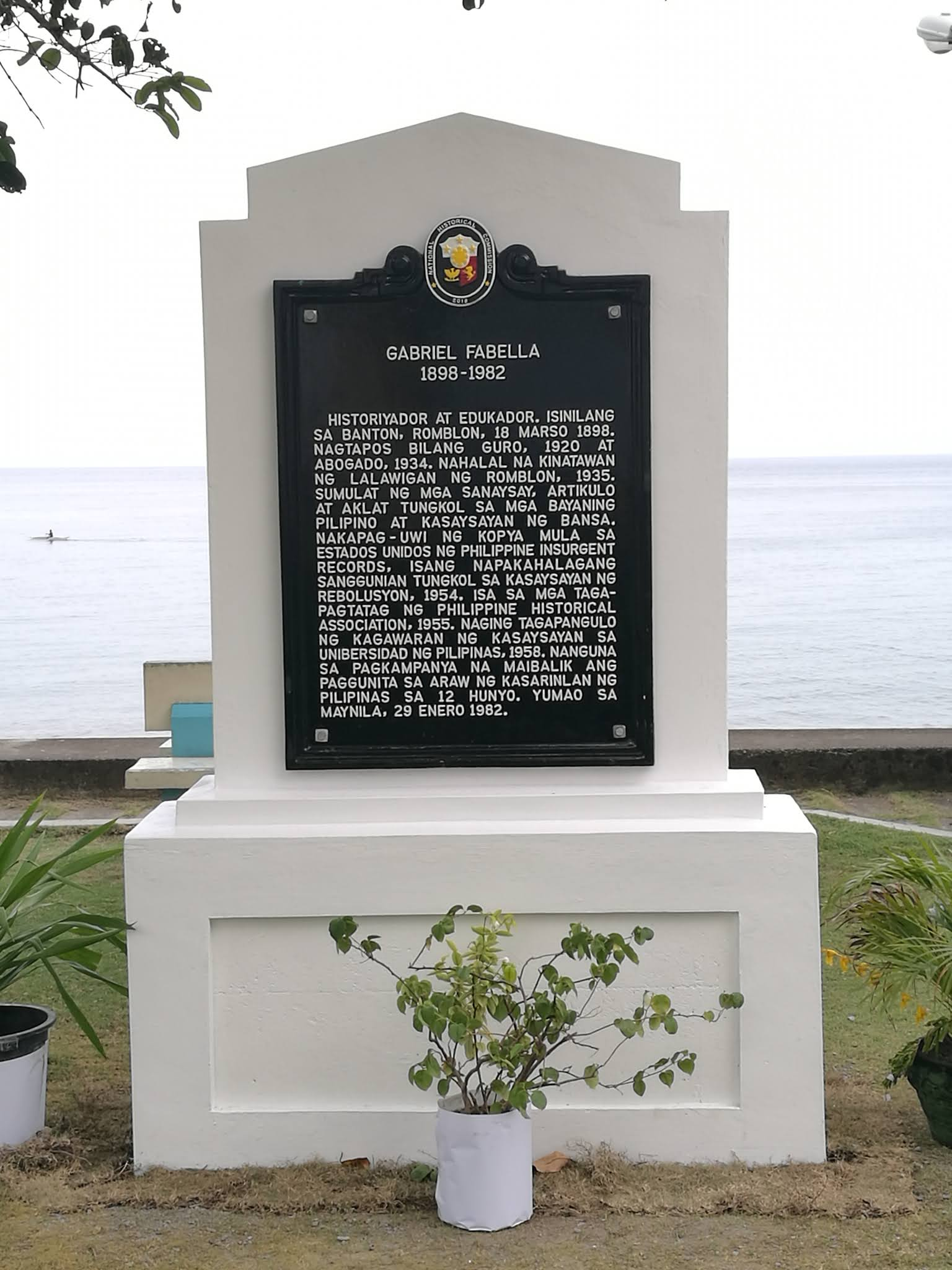
The historical marker honoring Gabriel Fabella installed in front of the Banton Municipal Hall in Banton, Romblon.

The resolution asserts the following:

- The United States celebrates Independence Day every July 4, the day Americans declared their independence, not 3 September 1783 when Great Britain recognized their liberty;
- If the Philippines celebrates its Independence Day every July 4, their celebration would be dwarfed by the US celebration;
- June 12 was the most logical date since Filipinos were not actually particular about fixing of dates, what we actually cared for is independence itself; and,
- If the Philippines celebrates common Independence Day with US, other nations might believe that the Philippines is still a part of United States.

In support of the resolution, Fabella gave public speeches and radio interviews explaining the significance of celebrating June 12 as the country's Independence Day. He also wrote the article “Philippine Independence: June 12 or July 4? which was published in the Sunday Times Magazine on July 1, 1956, and garnered positive responses and support from the people.

The resolution reached Philippine President Diosdado Macapagal, who issued Proclamation No. 28, declaring June 12 as the country's Independence Day. Congress made the proclamation formal with the adoption and passage of Republic Act No. 4166.

== Death ==
Fabella died in Manila on January 29, 1982, at the age of 83. The National Historical Commission of the Philippines (NHCP) installed a historical marker honoring Fabella in front of the Banton Municipal Hall in Banton, Romblon on 3 October 2018.

== Bibliography ==
- Ancheta, Celedonio (1962). The father of Philippine independence day. Quezon City: Pilipino Teacher Publications, Inc.
- Esquejo, Kristoffer (July–December 2011). "Gabriel F. Fabella:Talambuhay at Pamana ng Tinaguriang 'Ama ng Hunyo 12,' 1898". Philippine Social Sciences Review (in Filipino). 63 (2).
- Fabella, Gabriel (1998). The Man from Romblon. San Fernando, La Union: Northern Educational Development Center, Inc.
