= Encarnación Alzona =

Filipino historian, educator and suffragist (1895–2001)

Encarnación Alzona ONS
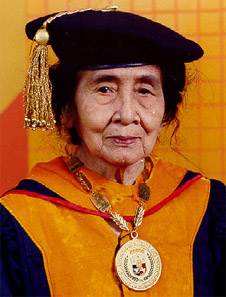
- Official portrait, National Academy of Science and Technology

3rd Chairperson of the National Historical Commission of the Philippines
- In office September 1966 – July 1967
- Preceded by: Eulogio Balan Rodriguez
- Succeeded by: Carmen Guerrero Nakpil

2nd Chairperson of the University of the Philippines Diliman Department of History
- In office 1923–1926
- Preceded by: Austin Craig
- Succeeded by: Leandro Fernández

Personal details
- Born: Encarnación Alzona y Amoranto; March 23, 1895 Biñan, Laguna, Captaincy General of the Philippines
- Died: March 13, 2001 (aged 105) Manila, Philippines
- Education: University of the Philippines Manila (BA, MA); Radcliffe College, Harvard University (MA); Columbia University (Ph.D.)
- Occupation: Historian, academic, suffragist
- Awards: Order of National Scientists of the Philippines (1985)

Encarnación Amoranto Alzona (March 23, 1895 – March 13, 2001) was a pioneering Filipino historian, educator and suffragist. The first Filipino woman to obtain a Ph.D., she was conferred in 1985 the rank and title of National Scientist of the Philippines.

== Early life and education ==
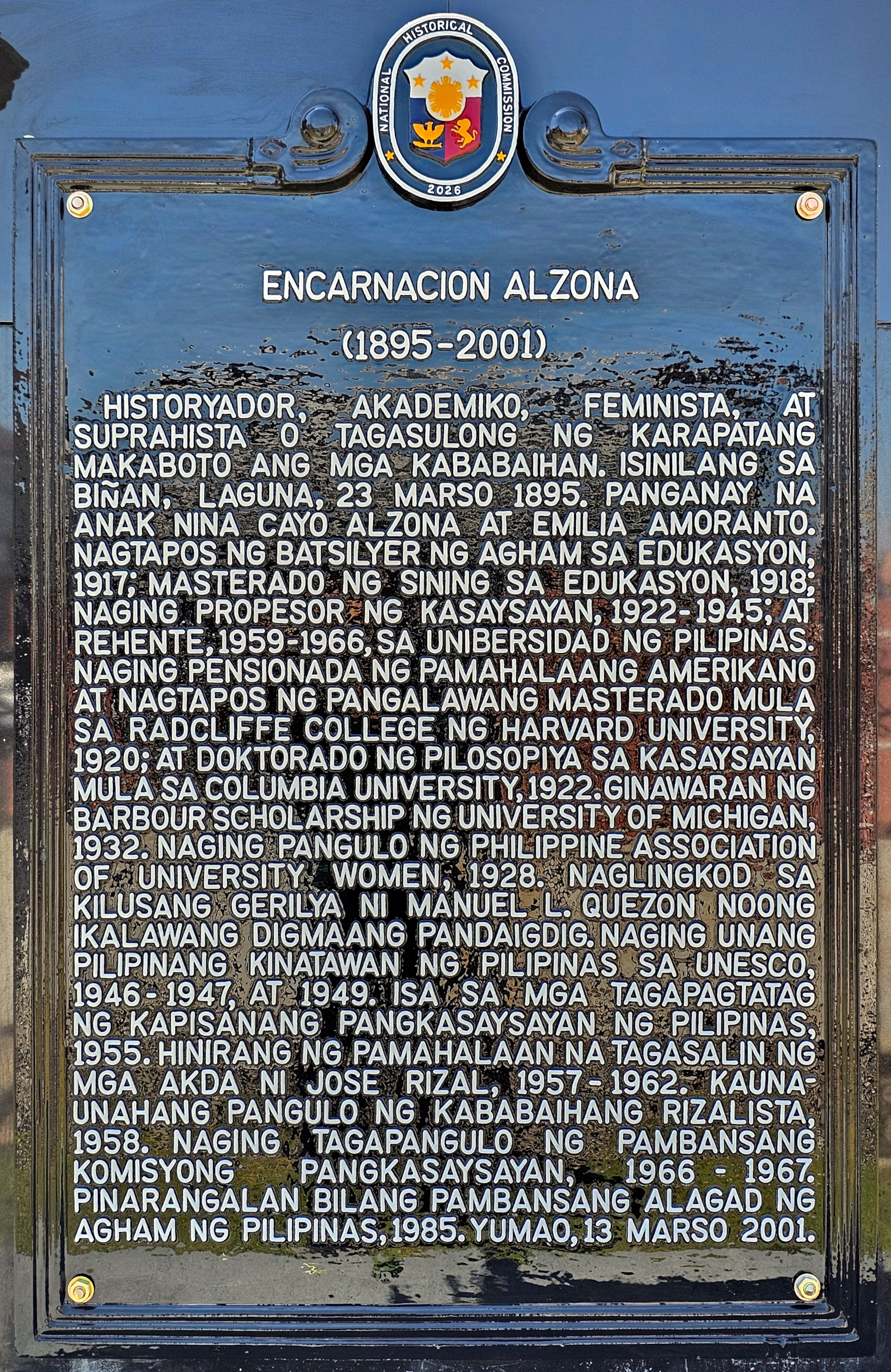
National historical marker installed in 2026 in Biñan

Encarnación Alzona was born in Biñan, Laguna and grew up in the province of Tayabas. Her father was a trial court judge and a distant relative of Jose Rizal. Both her parents were voracious readers, a circumstance that fostered her academic inclinations. She obtained a degree in history from the University of the Philippines in Manila in 1917, and a master's degree the following year from the same university. Her thesis was a historical survey on the school education of women in the Philippines, a theme that proved apt in light of her later activism as a suffragette.

Alzona pursued further studies in the United States as a pensionado, a scholar funded by the American government. She obtained another master's degree in history from Radcliffe College, Harvard University in 1920, and a Ph.D. from Columbia University in 1923. Alzona was the first Filipino woman to have obtained a Ph.D.

Alzona returned to the Philippines in 1923 and joined the faculty of the Department of History, of the original Manila campus of the University of the Philippines, which was later moved to the University of the Philippines Diliman.

== Involvement in women's suffrage ==
Even as American women won the right to vote in 1920, women in the Philippines, then an American colony, were not accorded the same right. As early as 1919, Alzona spoke in favor of conferring the right of suffrage to Filipino women, in an article she published in the Philippine Review. In a newspaper article she wrote in 1926, Alzona lamented the fact that the Philippine legislature, which she described as the "bulwark of conservatism" had yet to consider legislation in favor of women's suffrage.

In 1928, Alzona was elected President of the Philippine Association of University Women, an organization that eventually focused its efforts on launching a movement to grant women the vote. For her part, Alzona authored a book in 1934, The Filipino Woman: Her Social, Economic and Political Status (1565–1933), where she maintained the manifest equality of Filipino women despite the considerable deprivation of their social and political rights. Alzona's writings during this period bolstered social and political support for women's suffrage, which was finally granted in 1937.

== Historian ==
From her perch in the academe, Alzona wrote several books on the history of the Philippines. Her first book, published in 1932, was entitled A History of Education in the Philippines 1565–1930. It was lauded as "a comprehensive account of the education and cultural development of the country [and] probably the most complete and comprehensive work on the subject to date". Alzona also wrote biographies on pioneer Filipino women such as Paz Guazon and Librada Avelino, and undertook to translate historical works of Jose Rizal and Graciano Lopez Jaena. She authored a Spanish language historical monograph entitled El Llegado de España a Filipinas, for which she received the Lone Prize awarded by the Il Congreso de Hispanistas de Filipinas in 1954.

Alzona left the faculty of the University of the Philippines in 1945, although she would be appointed U.P. professor emeritus of history in 1963. In 1955, she co-founded the Philippine Historical Association along with other prominent historians such as Teodoro Agoncillo and Gregorio Zaide. From 1959 to 1966, Alzona chaired the National Historical Institute (then the National Historical Commission).

Alzona was a tireless promoter of the works and legacy of her distant relation, the national hero Jose Rizal. In addition to translating his works and frequently lecturing on Rizal, Alzona served as the first president of the Kababaihang Rizal.

== Public figure ==
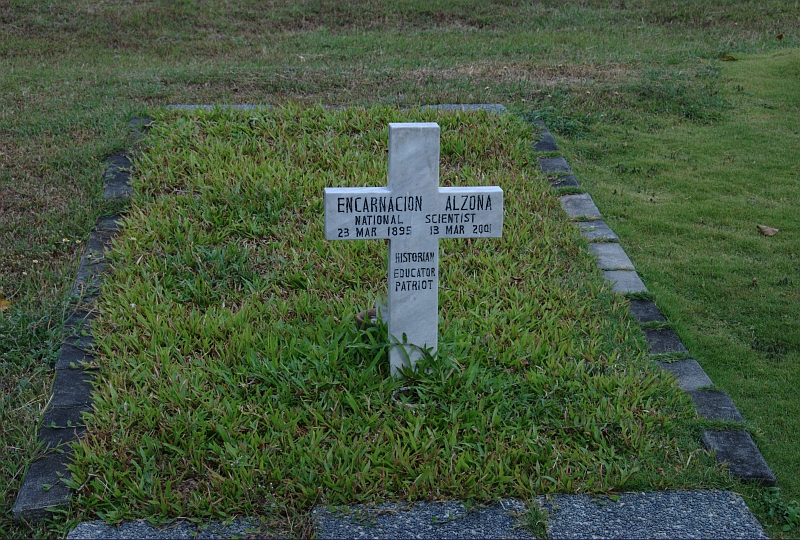
As a National Scientist, Alzona is buried at the Libingan ng mga Bayani.

Alzona chose to remain in Manila for the duration of the Japanese Occupation during World War II. She was involved in the guerrilla movement against the Japanese.

After the war, Alzona was appointed by President Manuel Roxas as a member to the Philippine delegation to the UNESCO. She served in the delegation until 1949, and was elected to chair the Sub-Committee on Social Science, Philosophy and the Humanities in 1946. From 1959 to 1966, Alzona was a member of the Board of Regents of the University of the Philippines.

On July 12, 1985, Alzona was named as a National Scientist of the Philippines by then President Ferdinand Marcos.

Alzona was one of a few Filipinos notable in their own right who reached centenarian status. She died 10 days shy of her 106th birthday in 2001. She is interred at the Libingan ng mga Bayani.
