= Leandro Fernández (historian) =

Filipino historian

Leandro Heriberto Caballero Fernandez, also known as Leandro H. Fernandez, (March 13, 1889 – 1948) was a Filipino historian who will serve as forerunner for later historians in the ranks of Teodoro Agoncillo and Gregorio F. Zaide. He is well known for being the first Filipino chairperson of the University of the Philippines Department of History. Notable among his works is A Brief History of the Philippines, a textbook for Grade 7 students during the American period.

== Early life ==
Fernandez was born on March 13, 1889, at Pagsanjan, Laguna. He studied first at Pagsawitan Elementary School, then at Laguna Provincial High School. He also studied at Manila High School. As a pensionado, he was sent to the United States to study. In 1910, he obtained a bachelor's degree in Pedagogy at Tri-State College in Indiana. In 1912, he obtained a bachelor's degree in Philosophy. In 1913, he graduated with his Master of Arts in History at the University of Chicago and his Ph.D. in history at Columbia University. His dissertation is titled The Philippine Republic, later to be published by Yale University.

== Later career ==
Fernandez began his academic career as an instructor of history at the University of the Philippines Department of History in 1914. In 1921, he became a full professor. In 1926, he succeeded Austin Craig to become the first Filipino chairperson of the University of the Philippines Department of History. He would also become the longest serving chairperson when his service as chairperson ended in 1947, when he was succeeded by Tomas Fonacier. While serving as chairperson of the department, he also served as University Registrar in 1927 and Dean of the College of Liberal Arts from 1934 to 1947. In 1933, he succeeded Maximo Kalaw as editor of the Philippine Social Science Review. In 1941, he was one of the founding members of the Philippine National Historical Association. In 1948, Fernandez died in his home in Pagsanjan, Laguna.

== Works ==
- A Brief History of the Philippines (1919; republished 1926, 1932, 1951)
- The Rise of Filipino Nationality (1920)
- Stories of the Provinces: A Brief History of Each of the Provinces in the Philippine Islands (1925)
- The Philippine Republic (1926)
- Philippine History Studies (1926)
- The Story of Our Country (1927)
