= Nicolas Zafra =

Nicolas Zafra (21 December 1892 - 7 January 1979) was a Filipino historian and educator. He was professor emeritus of history at the University of the Philippines. He died on January 7, 1979. He was the president of the Philippine Historical Association in 1962 and was a recipient of the Cultural Heritage Award of the Philippines in 1969.

== Early life and education ==
Zafra was born on December 21, 1892, in San Fernando, La Union. His parents were Pia Alviar and Eugenio Zafra. He had two sisters, Maria Zafra Susara and Mercedes Zafra and two brothers, Balbino Zafra and Dr. Urbano Alviar Zafra (genealogy of Zafra family.) The Zafra family was quite active in local politics. He obtained his elementary and part of his secondary education in San Fernando. He studied at Manila High School, where he graduated in 1912.

In the University of the Philippines, he acquired three degrees: Bachelor of Arts in 1916, Bachelor of Education in 1918, and Master of Arts, major in history, in 1920. From 1939 to 1940, he pursued graduate studies in history at the University of Minnesota.

== Career ==
Zafra began his career in 1917, as assistant instructor in the department of history of the U.P.

He became full professor and head of the history department in 1948, serving as such for a full ten years. Still head of the history department, he was appointed member of the Social Science Research Center (SSRC) upon its organization under its chairman Dean Tomas Fonacier of the U.P. College of Liberal Arts.

From 1952 to 1953, he was a Fulbright research grantee. In 1955, he was invited by the American Academy of Asian Studies in San Francisco as its visiting professor.

He was a member of the Philippine Historical Association, Philippine National Historical Society, National Research Council of the Philippines, and the International Association Historians of Asia. He was the president of the Philippine Historical Association in 1962.

He also undertook investigations and research into Philippine historical landmarks and personalities, both prominent and obscure, as well as prepared and wrote historical biographies, particularly of the members of the Malolos Congress, and the text of various historical markers. In 1963, the University of the Philippines conferred on him the rare title of professor emeritus of history.

He also received the Cultural Heritage Award, which the Philippine government presented to him in 1969.

Zafra was married to fellow academician Professor Luz Alzona. He had two daughters: Sister Lourdes, a nun, and Felicidad.

== Main works ==
- Historicity of Rizal’s Retraction (Bookmark, 1961). In this book, he defended the retraction, and called it "a plain, unadorned fact of history, having all the marks and indications of historical certainty and reality."
- A Short History of the Philippines (1966)
- Philippine History Through Selected Sources (1967)
- Oriental History (co-authored with Ganzon).
