= Fonacier =

Fonacier is a surname. Notable people with the surname include:

- Chai Fonacier, Filipino actress, singer, writer, and songwriter
- Larry Fonacier (born 1982), Filipino basketball player
- Santiago Fonacier (1885–1977), Filipino bishop and politician
- Tomas Fonacier (1898–1981), Filipino historian and educator
