= Sonia M. Zaide =

Filipino historian and author (born 1944)

- Born: 1944 (age 81–82)
- Other names: Sonia Magbanua Zaide; Sonia Zaide Pritchard; Sonia Z. Pritchard
- Education: London School of Economics
- Occupations: Historian, author, editor
- Relatives: Gregorio F. Zaide (father)
- Writing career
- Subjects: Philippine history, international relations, marine pollution
- Notable works: Oil Pollution Control; The Tokyo War Crimes Trial

Sonia Magbanua Zaide (born 1944), who publishes as Sonia M. Zaide and has also been credited as Sonia Zaide Pritchard and Sonia Z. Pritchard, is a Filipino historian, author, editor and scholar of international relations. Her publications concern Philippine history, maritime pollution policy and the records of the International Military Tribunal for the Far East. She is a daughter of Filipino historian Gregorio F. Zaide.

== Early life and education ==
The finding aid for the Zaide Family Papers identifies Sonia, born in 1944, as one of the three surviving children of Gregorio F. Zaide and Dolores Magbanua Zaide, and describes her as a historian, academic and writer.

Zaide studied at the London School of Economics (LSE). A 1974 article identified her with the LSE Department of International Relations, and she later wrote that her book Oil Pollution Control was based partly on a PhD thesis completed at LSE in 1975.

== Career ==
=== International relations and marine pollution ===
Zaide's early research dealt with international law and policy concerning the sea. In 1974, Millennium published her survey of that year's United Nations Law of the Sea Conference. She subsequently wrote “Load on Top—From the Sublime to the Absurd”, an article about a tanker method intended to reduce operational oil discharges, for the Journal of Maritime Law and Commerce.

Her 1987 monograph Oil Pollution Control traced policies and practices concerning marine oil pollution from the 1920s through the 1973 Marine Pollution Convention. In a 1994 study of compliance with international oil-pollution rules, political scientist Ronald B. Mitchell cited Zaide's book as a source for the history of control efforts from the 1920s through the 1970s.

=== Tokyo Trial records ===
With R. John Pritchard, Zaide annotated, compiled and edited the 22-volume The Tokyo War Crimes Trial, a published transcript of proceedings before the International Military Tribunal for the Far East. They also produced a five-volume index and guide with project director Donald Cameron Watt; Garland published the sets between 1981 and 1987. In their 2018 study of the tribunal, legal scholar David Cohen and historian Yuma Totani described the 22-volume edition and its companion guide as among the print editions indispensable to researchers.

=== Philippine history writing and archival work ===
Zaide wrote and revised textbooks and reference works on Philippine history, including editions first written with or by her father. The 1987 edition of Philippine History and Government was jointly credited to Gregorio and Sonia Zaide, while the 1999 edition was credited to Sonia Zaide alone. She also prepared additional notes for the 1990 edition of her father's multi-volume Documentary Sources of Philippine History.

In a 2017 analysis of 15 Philippine history textbooks, historian Rommel Curaming treated Zaide's 1987 co-authored text and her 1999 book as examples of the diversity of nationalist discourses in postwar textbooks. He characterised the Christian emphasis of the 1999 book as religious nationalism and criticised its creationist treatment of human origins. Curaming also found that its overall treatment of Muslims was more favourable than that in several earlier textbooks, although he identified one unfavourable passage.

After Gregorio Zaide's death in 1986, Sonia inherited his personal library and served as curator of the collection, adding further material. In 1996, she sold the collection to the Ortigas Foundation Library, where it became part of the Zaide Family Papers.

== Selected works ==
- Zaide, Gregorio F.; Zaide, Sonia M. (1969). Government and Politics of the Republic of the Philippines. Quezon City: ALCA Publishing.
- Pritchard, Sonia Zaide (1974). "A Survey of the United Nations Law of the Sea Conference". Millennium. 3 (3): 270–276. doi:10.1177/03058298740030030701.
- Pritchard, S. Z. (1978). "Load on Top—From the Sublime to the Absurd". Journal of Maritime Law and Commerce. 9 (2): 185–224.
- Pritchard, R. John; Zaide, Sonia Magbanua (1981). The Tokyo War Crimes Trial. Vol. 1–22. New York: Garland.
- Pritchard, Sonia Zaide (1987). Oil Pollution Control. London: Croom Helm. ISBN 978-0-7099-2094-6.
- Zaide, Sonia M. (1994). Philippine History and Government (3rd ed.). Manila: All-Nations Publishing.
- Zaide, Sonia M. (1999). The Philippines: A Unique Nation. Quezon City: All-Nations Publishing.
