= Arellano High School =

Cayetano Arellano High School

Location
- Teodora Alonzo cor. Doroteo Jose Street; Santa Cruz, Manila; Philippines
- 14.6065°N 120.9793°E

Information
- Established: 1921
- Principal: John Butch C. Locara
- Grades: 7 to 12
- Language: English, Filipino
- Colors: Green and White
- Newspaper: Ang Tambuli and The Chronicler
- Website: cayetanoarellanohs.depedmanila.com

Cayetano Arellano High School, otherwise known as Manila North High School, is a public secondary school located along Teodora Alonzo Street, Santa Cruz, Manila, Philippines. It is one of the oldest public schools in Manila.

== History ==
The first American-established public high school in Manila was Manila High School, which according to the National Historical Institute, was established in 1906 under the tutelage of Dr. David P. Barrows, Director of Education and Mr. Charles H. Magee, Acting Superintendent of the City Schools of Manila.

In 1921, it was split into two: Manila South High School, later renamed Araullo High School and Manila North High School, now known as Arellano High School. The first principals were Americans.

In 1930, Manila North High School was renamed in honor of Justice Cayetano Arellano, the first Filipino Chief Justice of the Supreme Court.

Under the administration of Juan C. Laya (1945–48), the school annexed two units at La Chambre Building on Reina Regente Street in Binondo to accommodate the growing number of post-liberation students. These units later became the Jose Abad Santos High School.

During the administration of Angel Framo (1948–49), Arellano High School became the largest public school in Manila.

In 1949, the annexes in Halili and Rizal Avenue became Manuel L. Quezon High School. In 1961, the remaining five annexes in Mayhaligue, O'Donnel, Zurbaran, Santander and Lope de Vega were integrated to become Doña Teodora Alonzo High School.

== Notable alumni ==
- Lorenzo Sumulong
- Alberto Segismundo Cruz
- Alfredo M. Santos
- Benedicto Cabrera
- Adrian Cristobal
- Reynato Puno
- Andres Narvasa
- Edilberto de Jesus
- Jaime C. Laya
- Fernando Poe Sr.
- German Moreno
- Renato Constantino
- Fernando Sena
- Rosa Rosal

== Gallery ==
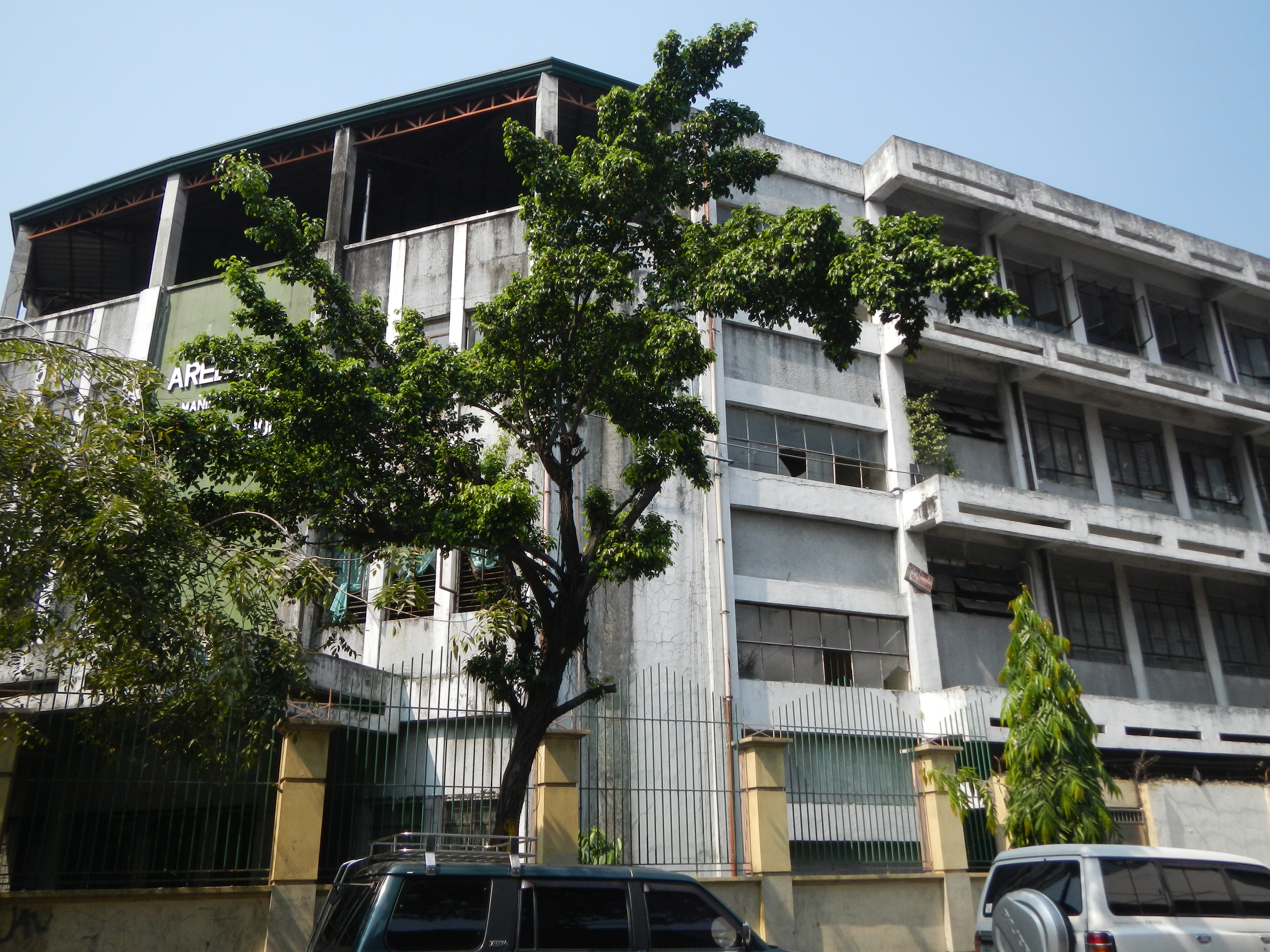
Details of the building

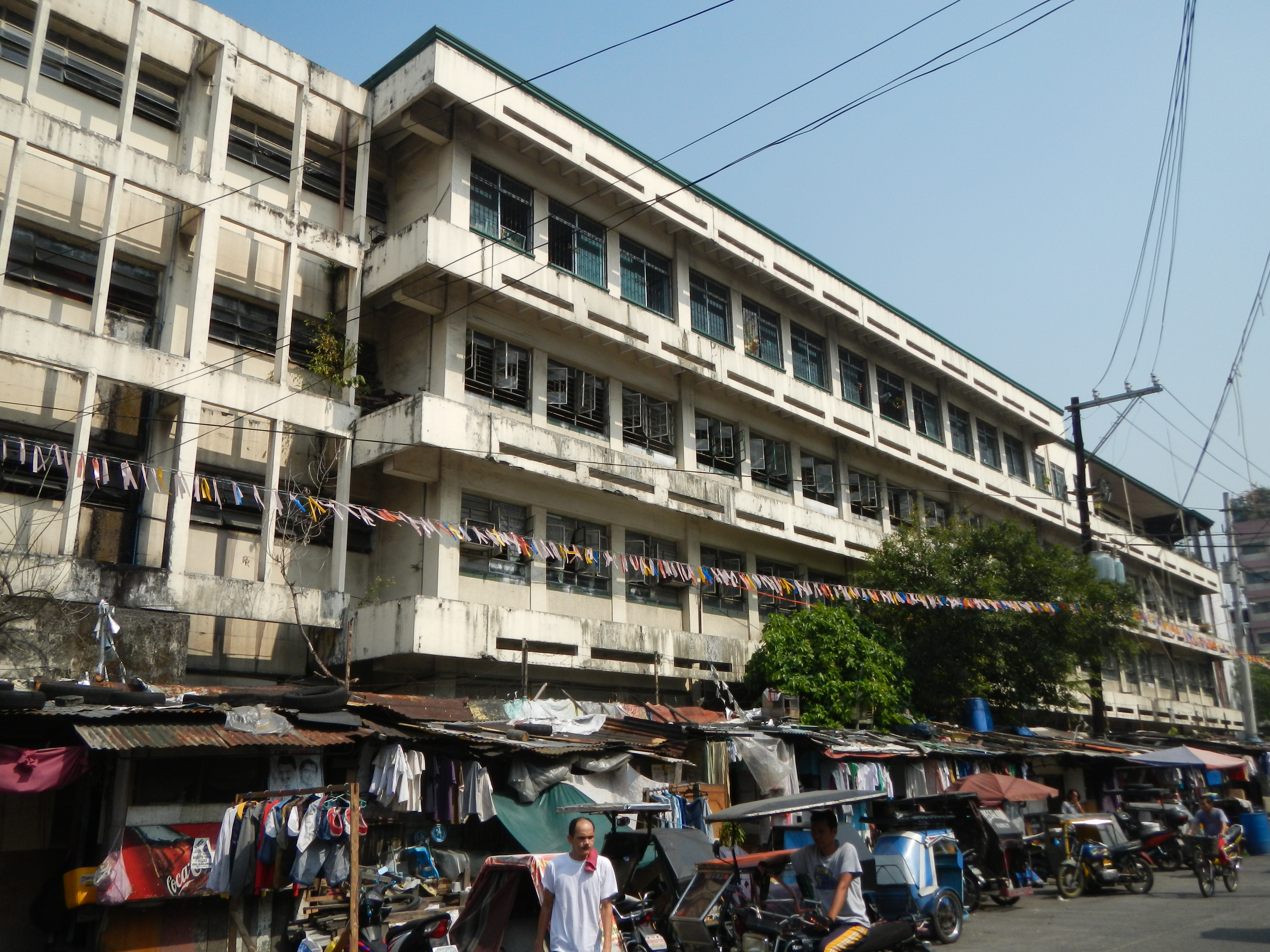
Facade along Doroteo Jose St (formerly Luzon St)

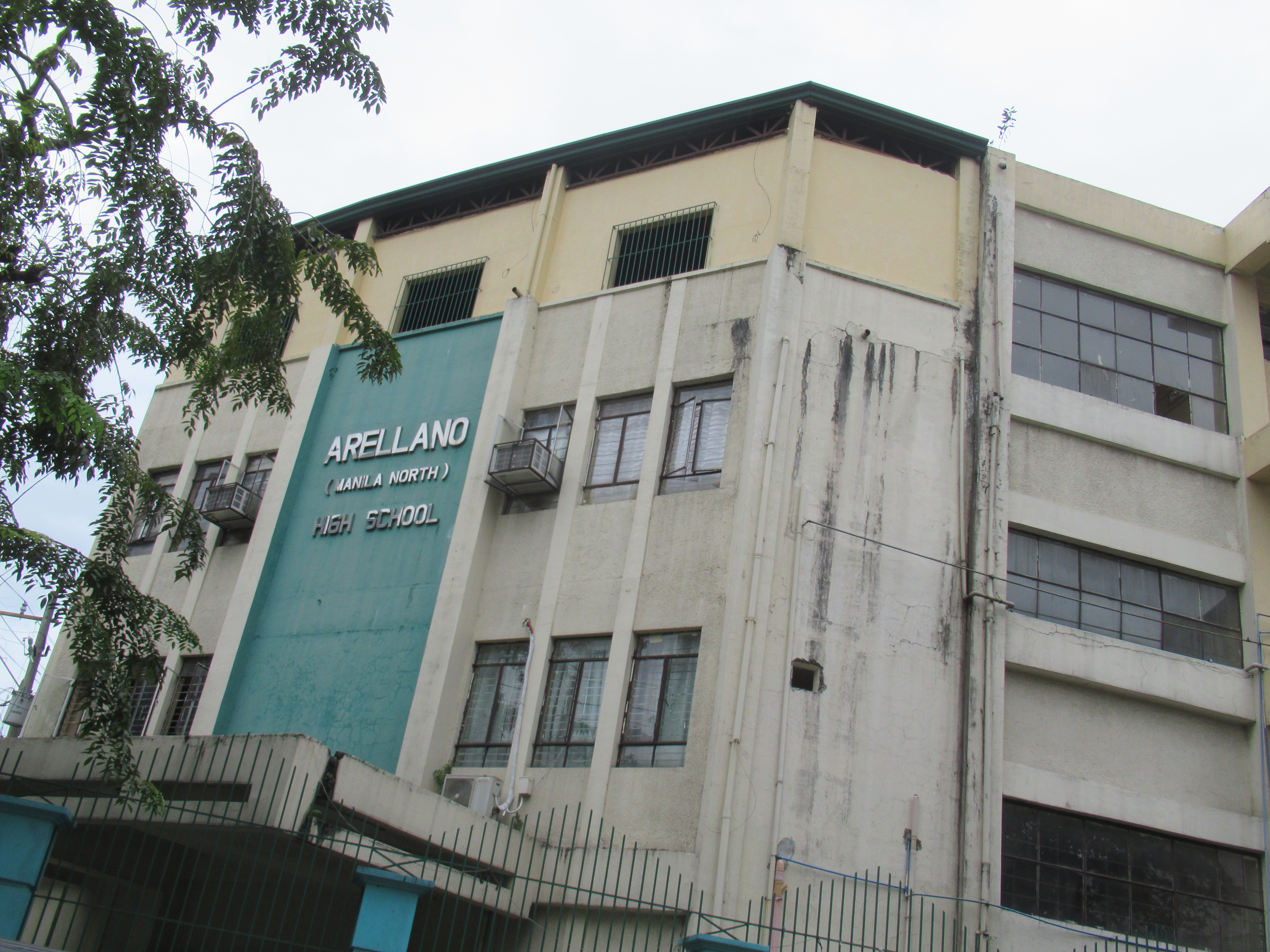
Facade in 2023 facing Teodora Alonzo St corner Doroteo Jose St.
