= Manuel L. Quezon High School =

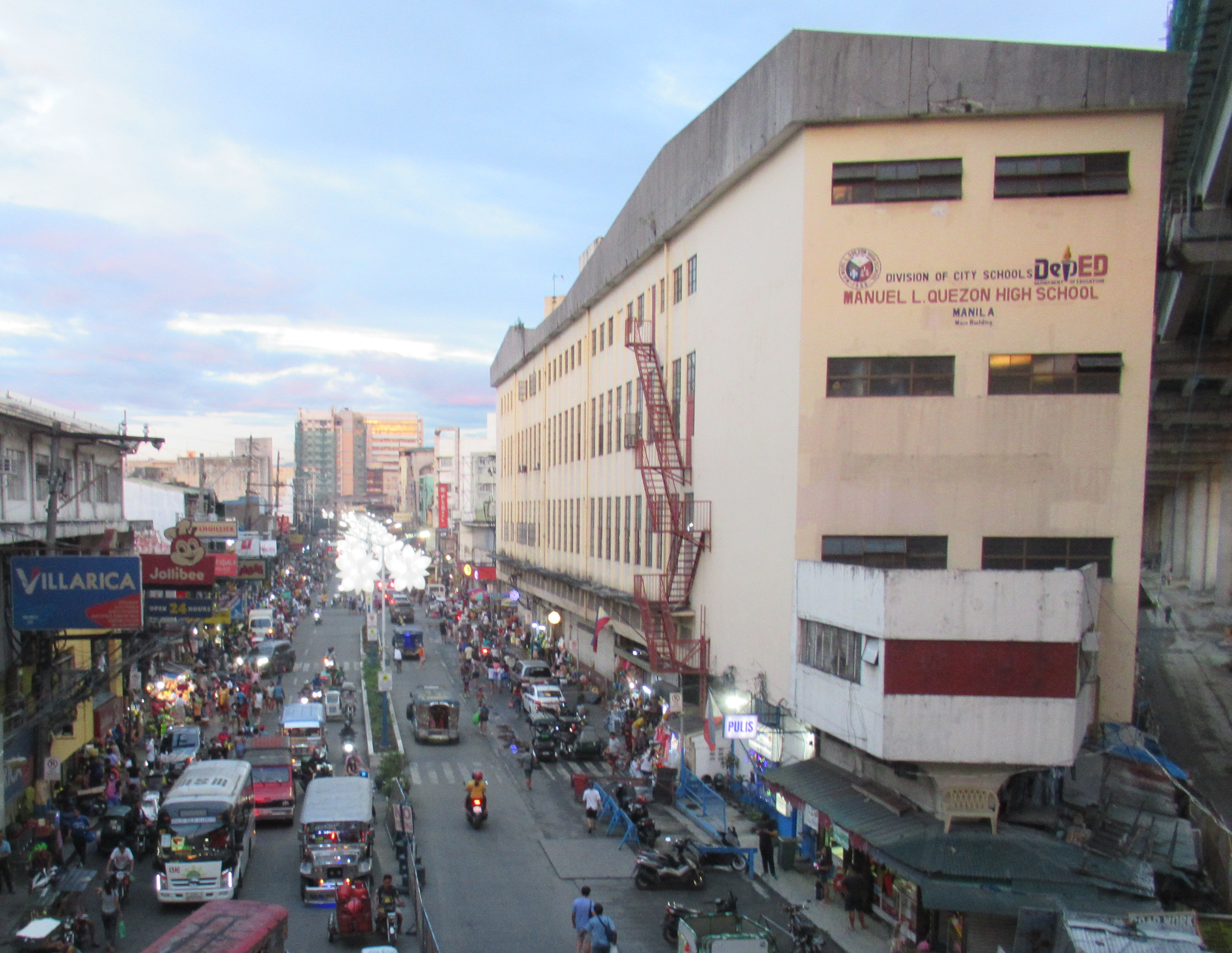
- Mataas na Paaralang Manuel Luis Quezon

Location
- Blumentritt Street, Sta. Cruz; Manila, National Capital Region; Philippines
- Coordinates: 14°37′23.232″N 120°59′0.024″E

Information
- Other name: Manuel Luis Quezon High School
- Former name: Cayetano Arellano High School (annex)
- Type: Public High School
- Established: 1906; 120 years ago as Manila High School (Intramuros); 1930; 96 years ago as Cayetano Arellano High School; 1949; 77 years ago as Manuel L. Quezon High School
- School district: II
- Grades: 7 to 12
- Language: English, Filipino
- Colors: Maroon and White
- Affiliations: Division of City Schools, Manila
- Website: www.facebook.com/mlqhsofficial

Manuel L. Quezon High School, formally known as Manuel Luis Quezon High School, situated along Blumentritt Road, Santa Cruz, Manila, Philippines, is one of the oldest public high schools in the city, aimed to serve the underprivileged. The school is named after Manuel L. Quezon, president of the Commonwealth of the Philippines from 1935 to 1944; the first Filipino to be in charge of a government of the Philippines.

== History ==
In 1921, the Manila city government mandated secondary schools in each of its four districts: Manila North High School, Manila South High School, Manila East High School, and Manila West High School.

In June 1930, Manila High School, founded in 1906, was split into two — Manila South High School which was named Manuel Araullo High School and Manila North High School which was named Cayetano Arellano High School.

In the immediate post-World War II years, Cayetano Arellano High School had become the largest public school in Manila. To accommodate the growing number of students, Cayetano Arellano High School was further subdivided, as annexed branches of the school were spun off, namely the Jose Abad Santos High School in 1948, and Manuel L. Quezon High School in 1949.

=== Expansion ===
- Manuel Luis Quezon High School (Manila) founded in 1949
- Manuel Luis Quezon High School (Caloocan City) founded in 1957
- Manuel L. Quezon University (MLQU) founded in 1947

Named after Philippine Commonwealth president Manuel L. Quezon, two high schools were established in Manila and its suburb of Pasay in 1949 named Manuel Luis Quezon High School (MLQHS). The second installation in Pasay was afterwards renamed on August 25, 1952 as Pasay City West High School. Students of the MLQHS system have featured actively in Philippine Department of Education (DepEd) sports programs, such as the Palarong Pambansa.
