= Fernando Sena =

Filipino painter

Fernando B. Sena
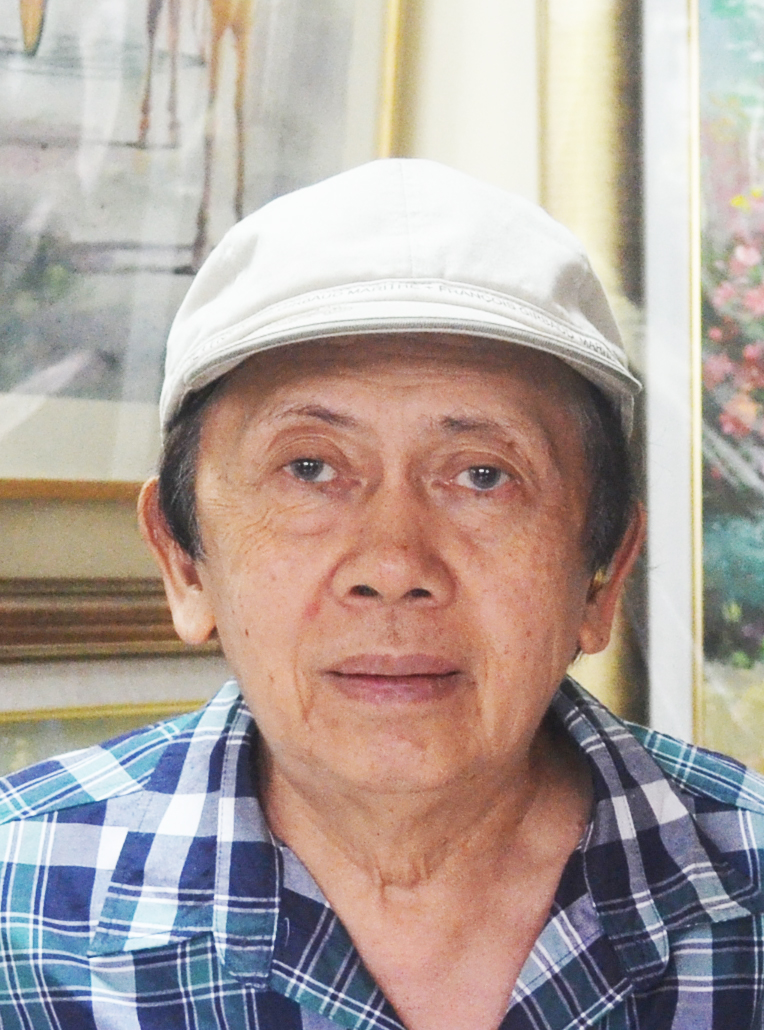
- Sena in 2014
- Born: Fernando Belen Sena; March 30, 1948 (age 78); Tondo, Manila, Philippines
- Education: University of the East
- Known for: Painting

Fernando Belen Sena (born March 30, 1948) is considered the Father of the Philippine Art Workshop for his tireless efforts in sharing his knowledge and talent with those who wish to learn. An all-around painter, Sena was born in Tondo, Manila and earned a Bachelor of Fine Arts degree majoring in painting from the University of the East in 1971.

== Early life ==
Fernando "Nanding" Sena was born on March 30, 1948, in Tondo, Manila to Arturo Sena, a plantsador, whose livelihood was from ironing clothes, and Faustina Belen, a market vendor.

Sena's family was poor and struggled to provide an education to him. He worked part-time as a newspaper peddler from elementary until high school. This stint led him into honing his drawing skills as he copied illustrations from comics and movie ads from unsold papers before returning them to the dealer.

== Education ==
For his elementary studies, he attended Gregorio del Pilar Elementary School, where his teachers recognized Sena's artistic skills. They asked him to draw historical figures and posted his works at the school library. Sena later entered Arellano High School in Santa Cruz, Manila for a vocational course in commercial arts instead of a college preparatory course. This was a backup plan in case he could not enter college, as he would be employable in the print industry with the completion of the course. He graduated from Arellano in 1965.

Sena continued working as a newspaper peddler to save money. He returned to Arellano to take up a vocational certificate course in painting and later graduated as class valedictorian in 1966. He was able to save up money for at least one semester of college. However his mother was swindled, leaving his family in debt, so he gave the money he saved to his mother instead.

He joined a free workshop of the Children's Museum and Library while he began saving money for college once again. At the end of the workshop, he was given a painting scholarship to the School of Music and Fine Arts of the University of the East, following an interview with the museum's director. He obtained a Bachelor of Fine Arts, Major in Painting in 1971.

== The Teacher ==
After graduating, Sena volunteered to teach the CMLI art classes for almost a decade. As the number of his students grew, their parents suggested to him that he conduct classes of his own. Sena now conducts free workshops in underprivileged areas such as Tondo, Sapang Palay, Carmona in Cavite, San Bartolome in Malabon, Antipolo, Taytay, and as far away as Tabaco, Albay. He also teaches free workshops to the sick, such as cancer and leukemia patients, to prisoners in jail, and children in orphanages. To this day, organizations invite him to conduct art classes. Sena offers art workshops during the summer at the Philippine Heart Center, U.P. Vargas Museum, and at his own home among other places. Among his former students are Fidel Sarmiento, the incumbent president of the Art Association of the Philippines, whom he taught in 1975 in the CMLI art workshops, and Ronald Ventura whom Sena taught in Malabon. He has also taught in University of the East College of Fine Arts and the University of the Philippines College of Fine Arts.

== The Artist ==
Fernando Sena divides his time between his two passions, painting and teaching. In 1973, Sena held his first one-man show at the Little Gallery at the Tesoro Building in Makati. Other solo shows followed at the Sining Kamalig, Gallery One, the National Library, the City Gallery, the Manila Hotel, the SM Megamall, and the Shangri-La Galleria. He participated in group shows at the Cultural Center of the Philippines, the Hotel Intercontinental Manila, and the SM Megamall. Sena also sent his paintings to exhibitions in Germany, Belgium, and China.

Sena works in different mediums and is influenced by different styles such as cubism, pointillism, realism, and impressionism. Sena is recognized for his still lifes of pandesal and toys but also tackles a whole range of subjects, such as landscapes, portraits, religious icons, and everyday people.

Sample Works

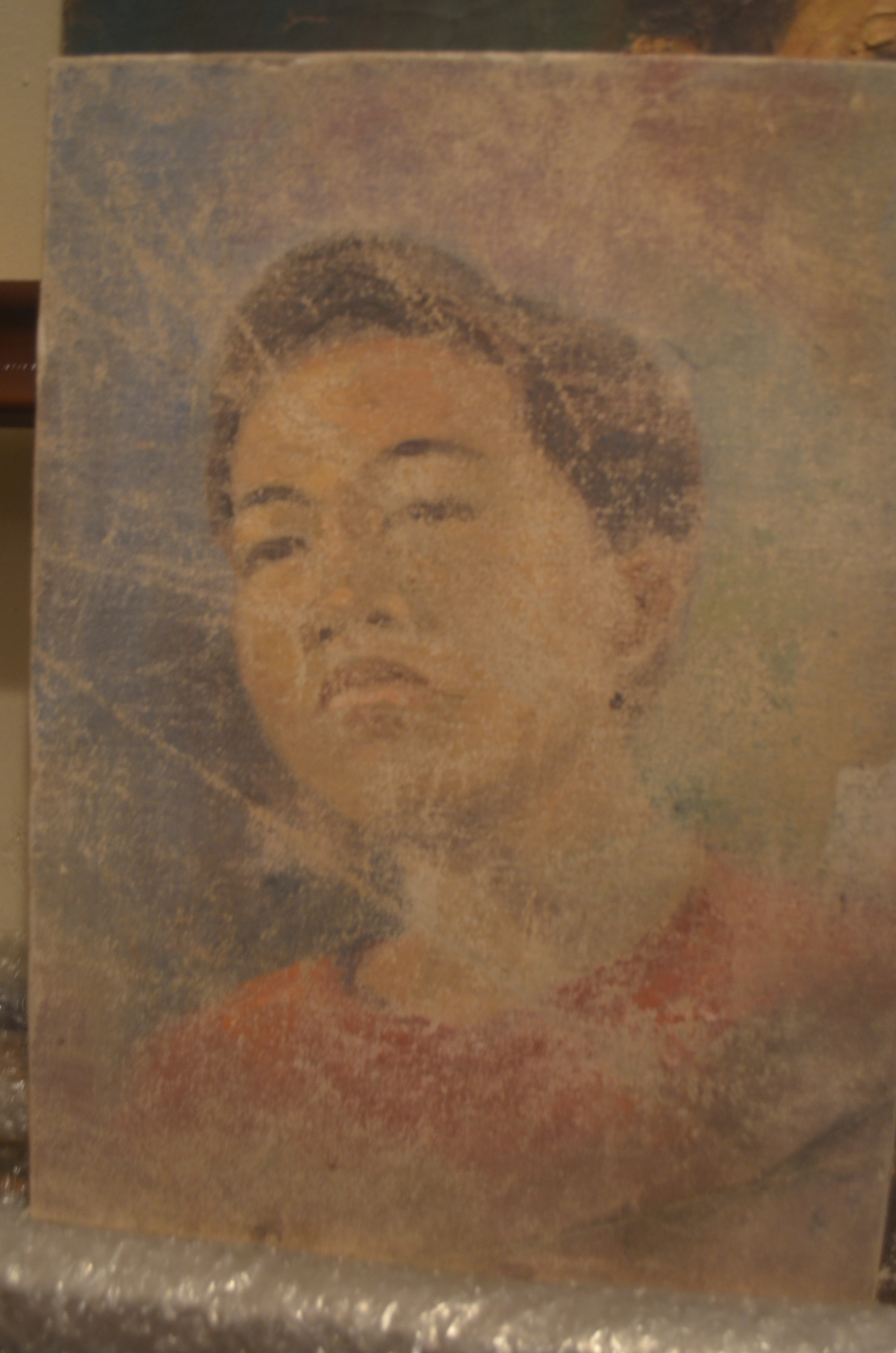
One of Fernando Sena's college plate featuring his brother

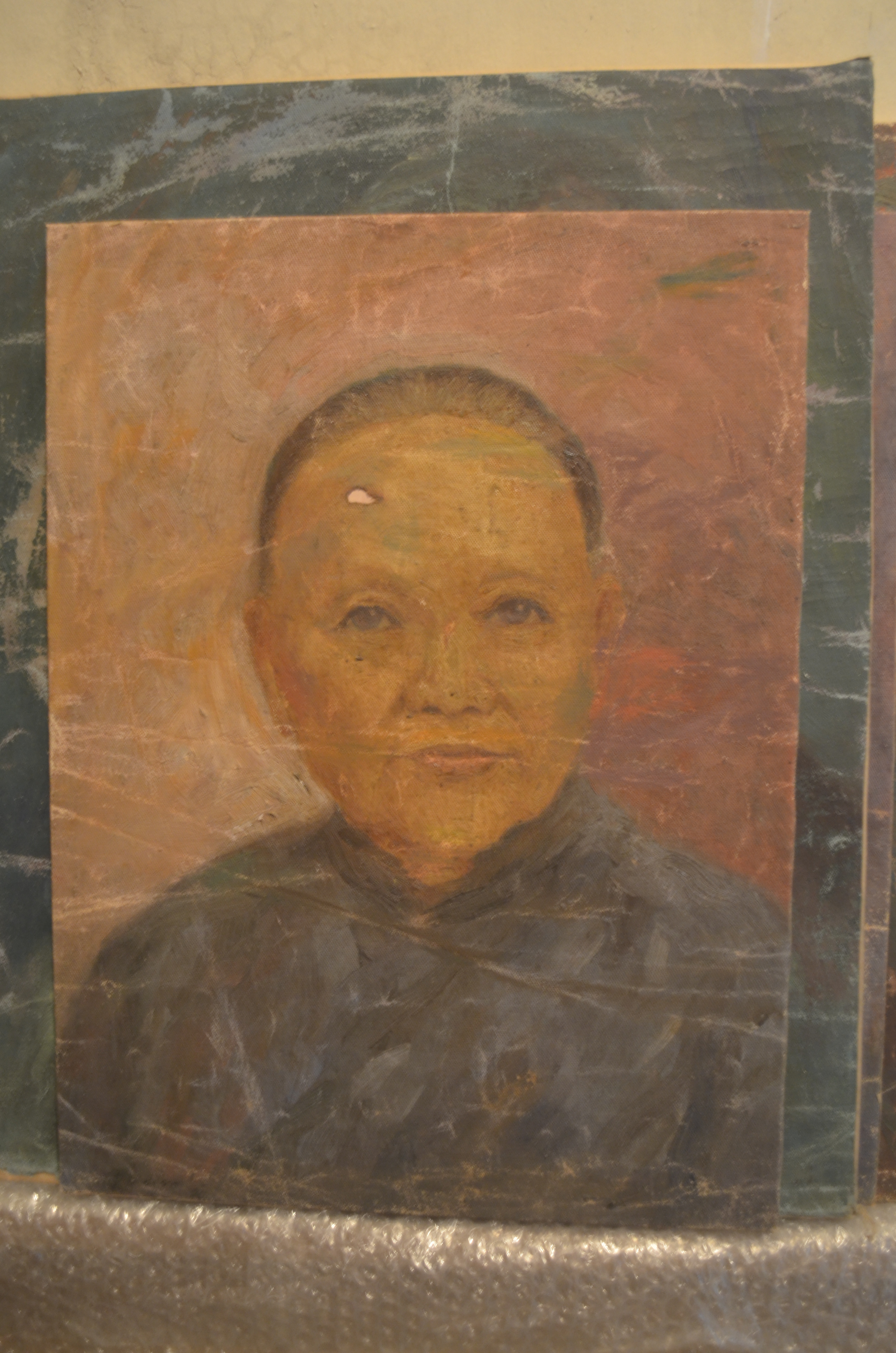
Sena's last college plate. The cigarette burn mark on the forehead was caused by a classmate as it was a tradition to ruin another classmate's last plate.

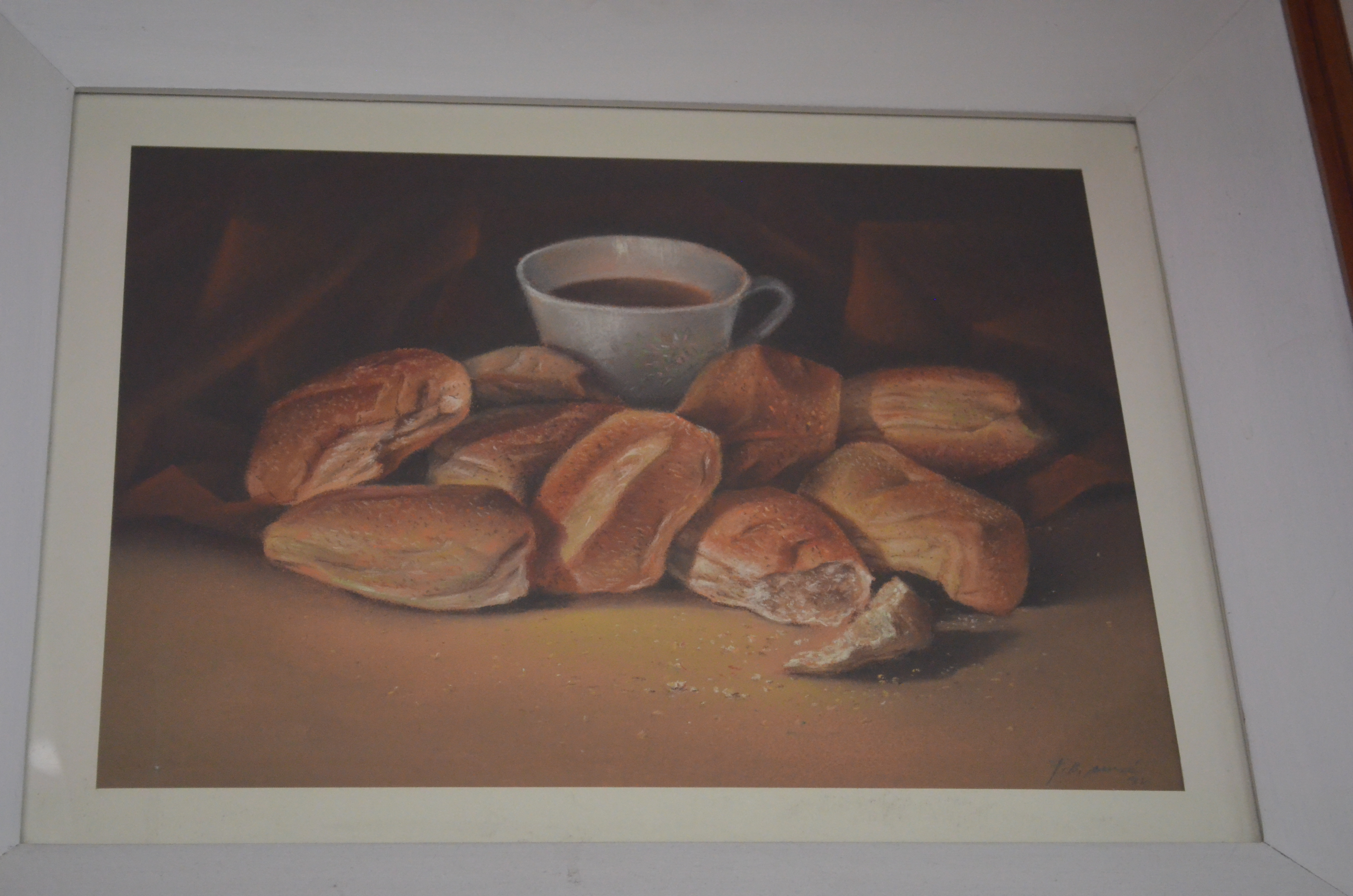
Fernando Sena's trademark, the First and Original Pandesal painting

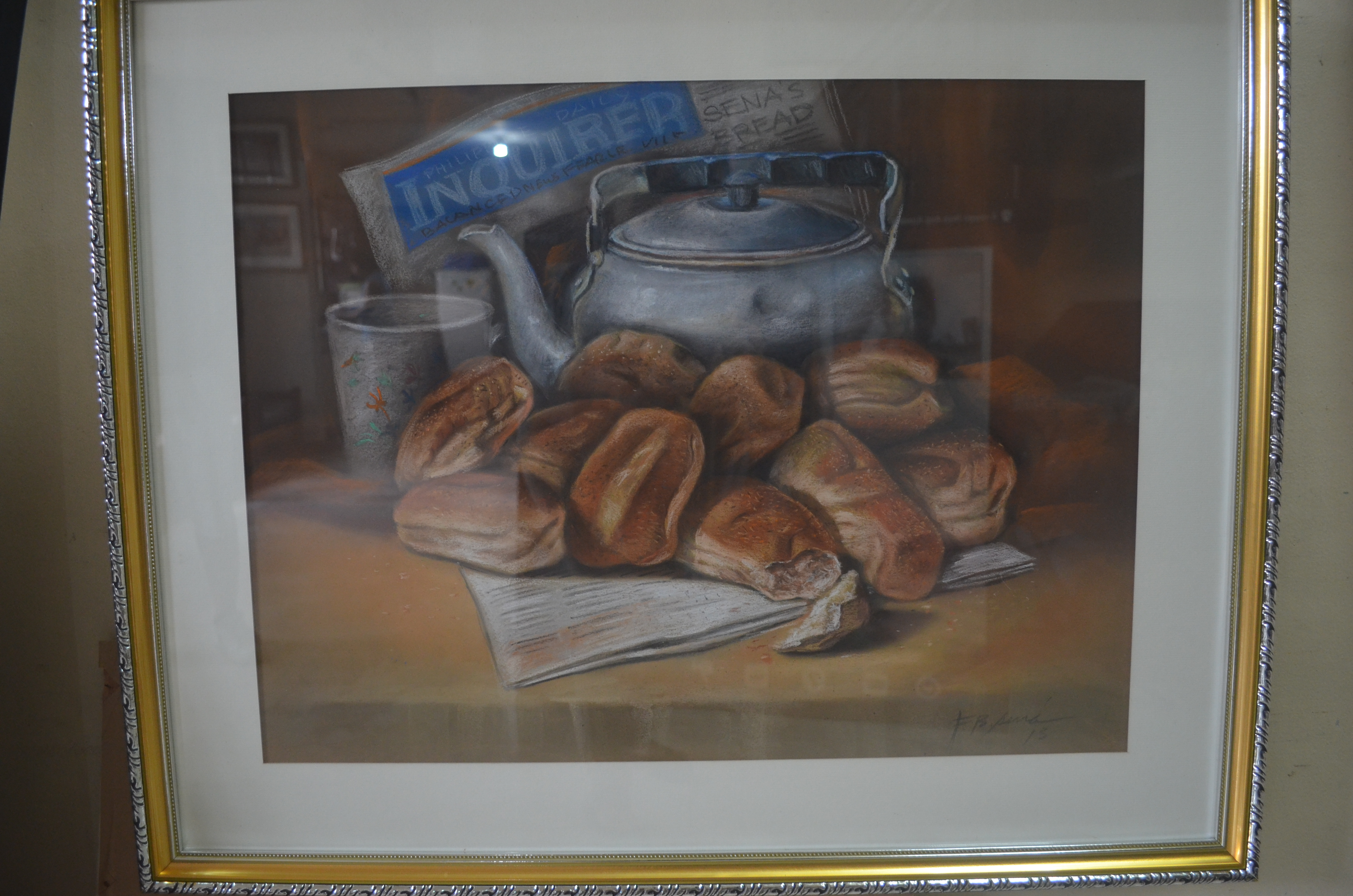
Another pandesal painting

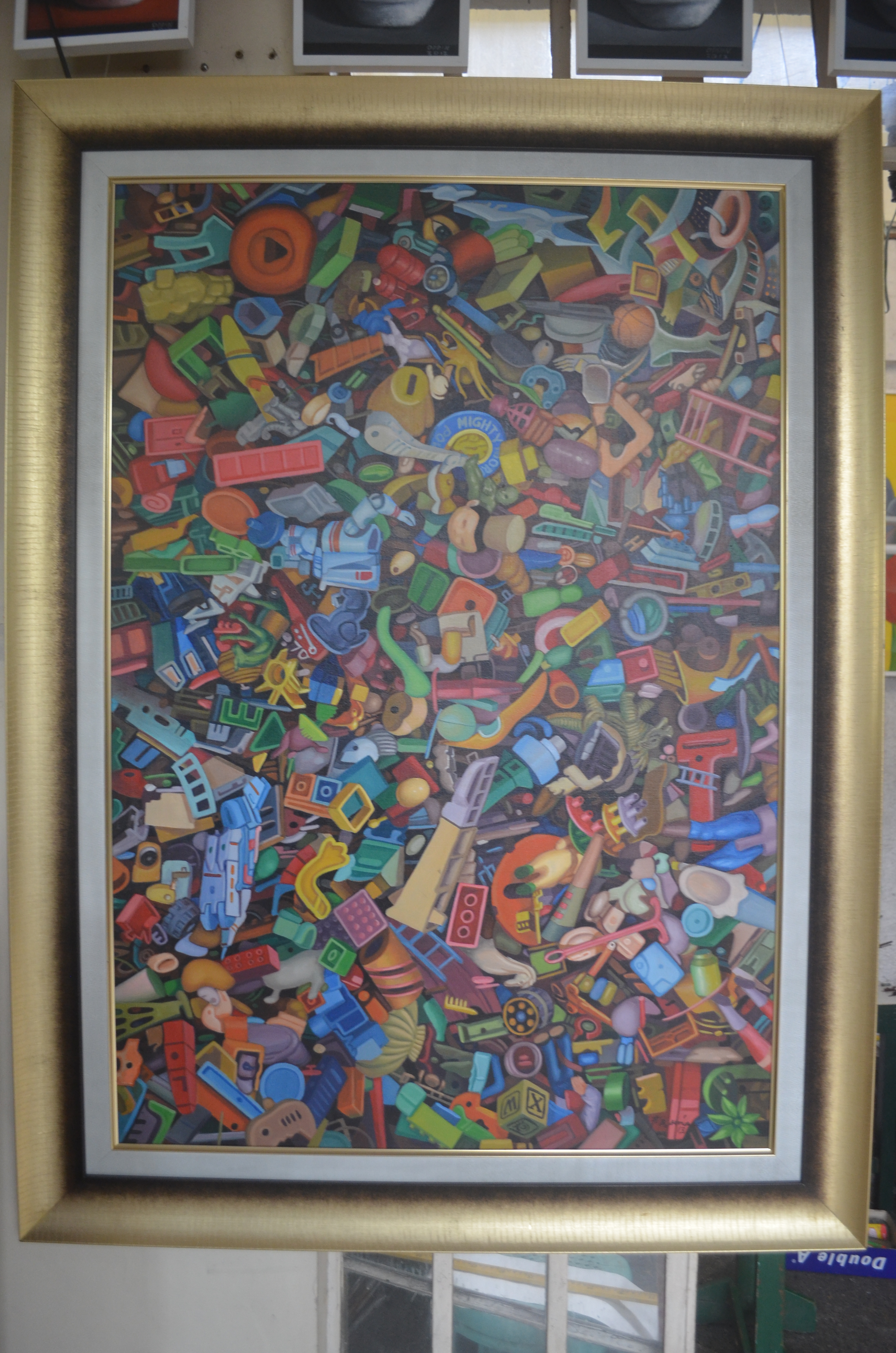
A painting depicting toys, another one of Sena's trademarks

== Social involvement ==
To Sena, a painter serves two functions:

- Personal, to showcase one's masterpieces to the people and earn money. In realizing this function, Sena has his home surrounded with paintings of his own and of his children.
- Social, to share his knowledge in art and painting to others. To continue his vocation, Sena established the Kabataan Tondo (formerly Troso) Art Group (KATAG) in 1975 and Art Discovery and Learning Foundation Inc. (ADLFI) in December 2001 which aims to discover and support young emerging artists.

He is currently the president of the ADLFI and a member of multiple art groups such as the Saturday Group, the Wednesday Group, the Art Association of the Philippines, and the Iguhit Alaminos.

== Reception ==
Other than gaining the reputation of being the "Father of Philippine Art Workshops", Sena was named as one of the "Ten Outstanding Manilans" in 1979 for helping the youth develop their talent in art. He also received the "Outstanding UE College of Fine Arts Alumni" award and the "Most Distinguished UE Alumni" in 1986 and 1989 respectively. He was also awarded a Certificate of Recognition by the "Bow Kami sa 'Yo" segment of ABS-CBN's "Hoy Gising!" on January 27, 1995, and "Patnubay ng Sining at Kalinangan" in the field of painting by the City of Manila during the Araw ng Maynila in June 1995.

== Personal life ==
Sena was married to Nancy Canauay with whom he had three children. Sena first met Canauay, a UP College of Arts and Letters professor, at an all-women exhibit he organized at City Gallery in 1985. After two years he proposed to her and got married. Within the same year of their marriage, she became pregnant with a daughter, whom they named Nadine. Nadine died five days after birth. In 1993, Nancy gave birth to Oddin and later to Roald a few years later. Sena's wife was later diagnosed with breast cancer and later confined at the Philippine General Hospital. She died in 1998.

In 1999, he met Ester Tacayon, an elementary schoolteacher from Cotabato. Tacayon served as tutor to Sena's son Roald. In 2001, Sena and Tacayon got married. A year later they had a daughter, whom they named Christine.
