= Tomas Fonacier =

Filipino historian (1898–1981)

Tomas Saguitan Fonacier (December 25, 1898 – July 5, 1981) was a Filipino historian and educator. He is known for being the second Filipino chairperson of the University of the Philippines Department of History, and the first dean of the University of the Philippines Iloilo (now part of University of the Philippines Visayas), which he helped found. Notable among his academic works is research on Chinese history and Ilocano history in the Philippines. According to the National Historical Commission of the Philippines, Fonacier's public service at the university, which spanned more than six decades, is the longest on record in that country.

== Early life and education ==
Fonacier was born on December 25, 1898, at Laoag, now part of Ilocos Norte. In 1917, he worked as a student assistant at the University of the Philippines (UP). However, he did not finish his tertiary education in that university. As a pensionado, he was sent to the United States to study. In 1922, he obtained a bachelor's degree at the University of California, Berkeley. In 1931, he garnered his Master of Arts in history at Stanford University. Two years later, he earned his Ph.D. in history in the same university. His dissertation was titled The Chinese in the Philippines during the American Administration.

== Career ==
Fonacier began his academic career as a municipal teacher in his hometown of Ilocos in 1918. After obtaining his bachelor's degree, he served as a teacher in the Bureau of Education, now Department of Education, for two years. In 1924, he became lecturer of history at the University of the Philippines Department of History. In 1941, he was one of the founding members of the Philippine National Historical Association.

In 1947, he succeeded Leandro Fernández to become the second Filipino chairperson of the University of the Philippines Department of History. He would only serve until 1948. In the same year, he was appointed dean in the newly formed University of the Philippines Iloilo, which would later become part of University of the Philippines Visayas. Fonacier was one of the proponents for the formation of this campus. In 1950, he was recalled to the main campus. He served as Acting Executive Vice President of the university from 1956 to 1958, Dean of the College of Liberal Arts from 1963 to 1966, and as a member of the Board of Regents from 1966. During this time, he also served as the first chairperson of the Institute of Asian Studies, which is now University of the Philippines Asian Center, from 1956 to 1963, as well as director of the newly formed University of the Philippines Clark, which is now University of the Philippines Diliman Extension Program in Pampanga, from 1961 to 1967. In 1964, he was recognized as professor emeritus in history, and a year later, as Rizal professor of humanities. By this time, then UP President Carlos P. Romulo appointed Fonacier as the first executive director of the Office of Alumni Relations. As executive director, he established foreign chapters for the UP Alumni Association (UPAA).

== Supreme Court trial ==
Fonacier also served as editor of the Philippine Social Sciences and Humanities Review. While in this position, he and his managing editor, Leopoldo Yabes, faced a Supreme Court case in 1961 due to the publishing of the article entitled Peasant War in the Philippines in 1958. According to the prosecution, the article seemed subversive and ripe with communist propaganda. Fonacier and Yabes argued that the purpose of the article was to show that peasant resistance is aimed at implementation of government reforms, rather than changing the government itself. By this time, the communist rebellion led by the Hukbalahap had already weakened, but remained a potential threat to the Philippine government. The court ruled in favor of Fonacier and Yabes on the grounds that the prosecutor could not provide ample evidence of the defendants' seditious intent.

However, suspicion of Fonacier, despite his background as a pensionado in the United States, continued through the early years of the Marcos administration, when student movements such as the Diliman Commune in the University of the Philippines intensified, and there was a resurgence in the communist rebellion, this time led by the New People's Army.

== Death ==
In 1978, while on a visit to China, he suffered a heart attack, which eventually forced him to use a wheelchair. He continued working in the university as regent. In the same year, he was conferred an honorary Doctor of Laws degree by UP. On July 5, 1981, Fonacier died due to pneumonia at the Veterans Memorial Medical Center in Quezon City.

== Personal life ==
His wife was Consuelo Valdez, a UP professor who specialized in the Spanish language and drama. They had two daughters. Fonacier was known to be a member of the Philippine Independent Church.

== Works ==
- The relations between China and the Philippines (1930; republished 1958)
- The Chinese exclusion policy in the Philippines (1949)
- The Ilocano Movement (1953)
- The University of the Philippines (1953)
- Gregorio Aglípay y Labayan (1954)
- The Filipino Racial Memory (1958)
- Itlog mo (2024)
