= Austin Craig =

American historian (1872–1949)

- Born: Austin C. Craig; February 22, 1872; Eddytown, Starkey, New York, United States
- Died: February 11, 1949 (aged 76); Minneapolis, Minnesota, United States
- Occupation: Historian
- Known for: One of the first biographers of José Rizal

Austin C. Craig (February 22, 1872 – February 11, 1949) was an American historian born in Eddyton, New York. Being one of the first biographers of the Philippine national hero, José Rizal, a street was named after him in Sampaloc, Manila.

He was educated at Cornell University, University of Rochester, and the Pacific University. He arrived in Manila on July 25, 1904, as a teacher under the Bureau of Education, taking up positions in Lubang Island; Calapan, Mindoro; and finally in Manila at the Philippine School of Arts and Trades, the Philippine Normal School, Manila High School, the University of the Philippines, and the University of Manila (1922-1927).

In 1910, he became the first Chair of the Department of History of the University of the Philippines.

He was the holder of the Rizal professorial chair at the University of the Philippines in Padre Faura from 1912 to 1922. This chair was awarded him in recognition of his books on Rizal, the first being The Story of Jose Rizal, 1909, followed Lineage, Life and Labor of Jose Rizal, Philippine Patriot: A Study of the Growth of Free Ideas in the Trans Pacific American Territory. He died on February 11, 1949, in Minneapolis, Minnesota.
