= Manila High School (Intramuros) =

- Mataas na Paaralang Maynila
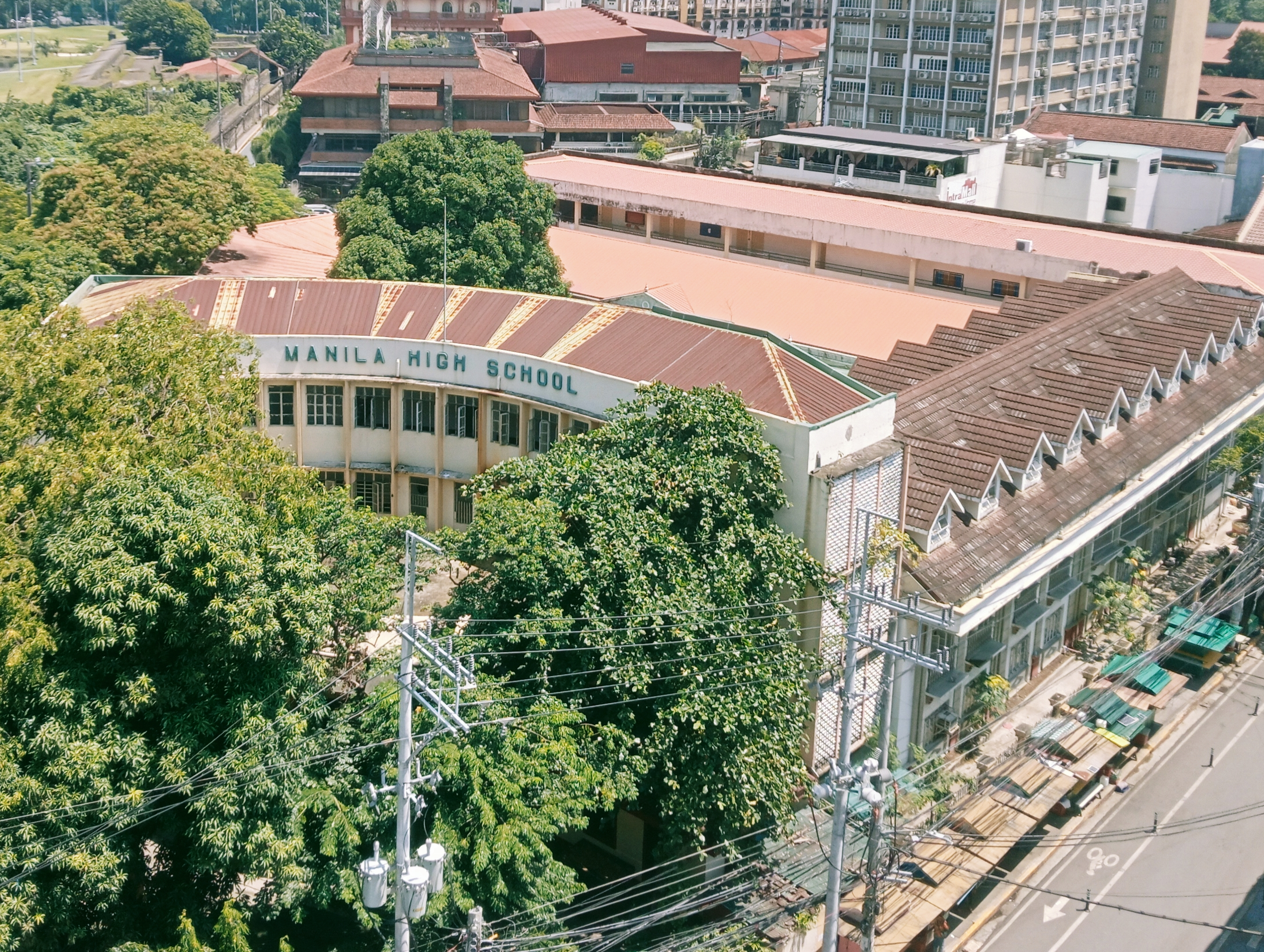
- Aerial view of Manila High School

Location
- Victoria corner Muralla Streets, Intramuros, Manila; Philippines
- Coordinates: 14°35.374′N 120°58.728′E

Information
- School type: Secondary Public School
- Founded: June 11, 1906
- Grades: 7 to 12
- Student Union/Association: SSLG (Supreme Secondary Learner Government)
- Colors: Green and White
- Slogan: Where excellence begins
- Song: MHS Hymn
- Fight song: Laban MHS!
- Teams: MHS Wall Warriors
- Newspaper: Ang Binhi (Filipino); The MHS Newsette (English)

The Manila High School is an educational institution in Manila, Philippines. It was first built along the present site of the Pamantasan ng Lungsod ng Maynila on General Luna Street in Intramuros from July 1963 up to April 1967. The school complex of the first Manila High School at Victoria Annex was formally inaugurated on February 26, 1967.

== History ==
This school, then called Escuela Municipal de Manila, was first established by the Spaniards in 1892 under the order of the Ayuntamiento de Manila. It stood at the former site of the Parian de San Jose market, which existed from 1783 to 1860, along Victoria Street, Intramuros. In 1899, when the Americans has gained colonial power over the Philippines, the school was renamed as the Manila Grammar School and American High School; both names were kept until 1905. Later, on June 11, 1906, the Americans founded the first public secondary school under their administration on the same site, renaming it Manila High School.

In 1921, the city government of Manila established secondary schools in each of the four districts; the Manila East, West, North, and South High Schools. Manila High School was renamed as the Manila South High School due to its location at the south of the mouth of the Pasig River. In June 1930, it was renamed as Araullo High School, in memory of Chief Justice Manuel Araullo. Eventually, it was completely destroyed during World War II. Araullo High School was reopened in its new location, at the compound of Epifanio de los Santos Elementary School in Malate.

Manila Mayor Arsenio Lacson approved Ordinance No. 3122 on January 27, 1948, changing the name, Araullo High School, into Manuel Roxas High School, in honor of the fifth President of the Philippines, President Manuel Roxas. Then, he approved Ordinance No. 4067 on October 9, 1958, declaring the separation of Roxas High School into four annexes. The Canonigo Annex became the present Roxas High School while the Mehan, Victoria (Intramuros), and MacArthur Annexes were combined and transformed into the new Manila High School. The site of the Cuartel de España in Intramuros was the initial location of Manila High School, by the declaration of Resolution No. 283 on May 26, 1953. However, due to the delay of construction, quonset huts were utilized as the main building of the high school. These quonset huts were acquired by the Division of City Schools since November 1947. First and second year high school students use the Mehan Annex. The remaining two annexes, the MacArthur and Victoria, were transferred to a three-storey building in July 1963, located on a 3-hectare (7.4-acre) lot along General Luna Street. In 1964, the first year high school students were housed at the MacArthur Annex, leaving the second year classes at the Mehan Annex.

Special Science Classes were held at the Victoria Annex; thus, it became the center of secondary science education in the city. In October 1963, Intramuros/Victoria Annex became the home of the first Manila Science High School. Arrangements were made to transfer the Manila Science High School at Padre Faura Street corner Taft Avenue (the former site of Araullo High School).

On April 24, 1965, President Diosdado Macapagal issued Proclamation No. 392-A, giving the proposed Pamantasan ng Lungsod ng Maynila the lot occupied by the high school along General Luna Street. On February 26, 1967, the high school officially transferred back to Victoria Street.

== Architectural features ==
=== MacArthur Annex ===
The Division of City Schools leased fourteen (14) rooms at the FEATI University Building in Santa Cruz, near the MacArthur Bridge, in July 1949 to accommodate first and second year classes. This move left the third and fourth year classes and all vocational and physical education classes at the Mehan compounds.

=== Victoria Annex ===
The Intramuros annex at the intersection of Victoria and Muralla Streets was opened with the transferred Quonset Hut from the Mehan Garden. Also, additional shop classrooms were established. On October 9, 1958, Victoria Annex, together with the MacArthur and Mehan Annexes, became the new Manila High School. The pilot science classes were located in this annex.

=== National Radio School Annex ===
In July 1953, the National Radio School Annex consisted of 11 rooms - necessary to accommodate the applicants to the first year classes. This annex was located at the National Radio School and Institute of Technology, along Ronquillo and Sales Streets in Quiapo. It was leased for the academic subjects of first year classes. The home economics, vocational, and physical education classes were held at the main building at Mehan. However, the same premises were leased again when school opened in July 1956 with a record breaking enrollment of 5,990 students; thus, making the school retain its rank as the fourth largest public high school.

=== Canonigo Annex ===
On October 9, 1958, the Canonigo Annex became the present Manuel A. Roxas High School. It is located along the present-day Quirino Avenue Extension in Paco.

== Present condition ==
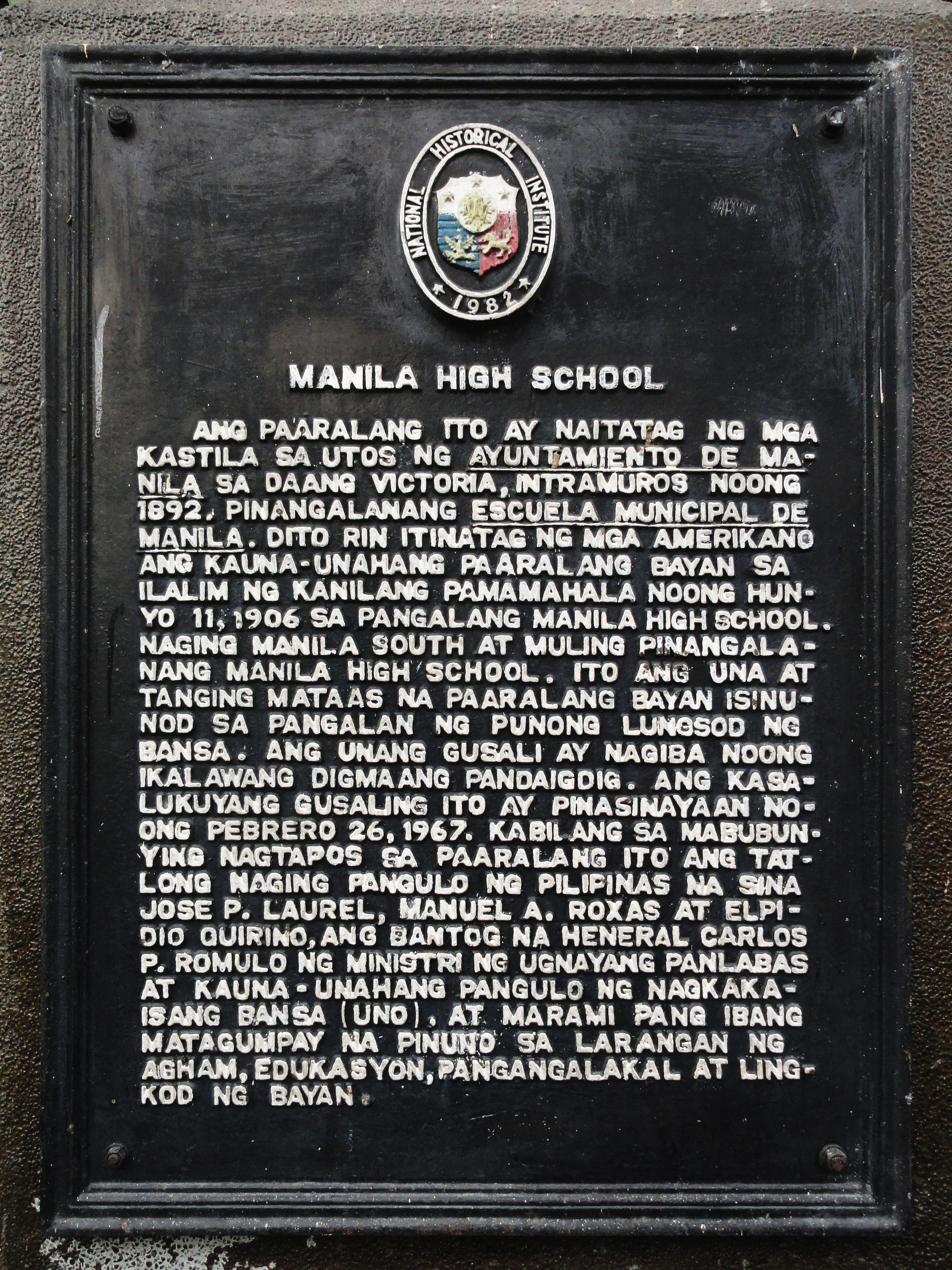
National Historical Commission of the Philippines Historical Marker of the Manila High School

On October 18, 2005, Ambeth Ocampo of the National Historical Institute issued a certification that Manila High School was officially established in 1906 under the tutelage of Dr. David P. Barrows, former Director of Education, and Charles H. Magee, former Acting-Superintendent of the City Schools of Manila. It officially started its operation on June 11, 1906, as decided by the Bureau of Education. In lieu of the certification, commemorative stamps were issued in celebration of its 100th anniversary.

The 1960s site of the Manila High School is presently occupied by the Pamantasan ng Lungsod ng Maynila.

=== Marker from the National Historical Commission of the Philippines ===
Manila High School
ANG PAARALANG ITO AY NAITATAG NG MGA KASTILA SA UTOS NG AYUNTAMIENTO DE MANILA SA DAANG VICTORIA, INTRAMUROS NOONG 1892. PINANGALANANG "ESCUELA MUNICIPAL DE MANILA". DITO RIN ITINATAG NG MGA AMERIKANO ANG KAUNA-UNAHANG PAARALANG BAYAN SA ILALIM NG KANILANG PAMAMAHALA NOONG HUNYO 11, 1906 SA PANGALANG "MANILA HIGH SCHOOL". NAGING "MANILA SOUTH" AT MULING PINAGALANANG "MANILA HIGH SCHOOL". ITO ANG UNA AT TANGING MATAAS NG PAARALANG BAYAN ISINUNOD SA PANGALAN NG PUNONG LUNGSOD NG BANSA. ANG UNANG GUSALI AY NAGIBA NOONG IKALAWANG DIGMAANG PANDAIGDIG. AND KASALUKUYANG GUASLING ITO AY PINASINAYAAN NOONG PEBRERO 26, 1967. KABILANG SA MABUBUNYING NAGTAPOS SA PAARALANG ITO ANG TATLONG NAGING PANGULO NG PILIPINAS NA SINA JOSE P. LAUREL, MANUEL A. ROXAS AT ELPIDIO QUIRINO, ANG BANTOG NA HENERAL CARLOS P. ROMULO NG MINSITRI NG UGNAYANG PANLABAS AT KAUNA-UNAHANG PANGULO NG NAGKAKAISANG BANSA (UNO), AT MARAMI PANG IBANG MATAGUMPAY NA PINUNO SA LARANGAN NG AGHAN, EDUKASYON, PANGANGALAKAL AT LINGKOD NG BAYAN.

== Notable alumni ==
- Conrado Benitez - Sportsman, journalist, constitutionalist, lawyer, educator, civic leader, and economist
- Bernardo Bernardo - Actor, comedian, playwright, and director
- Gabriel Fabella - Historian, Former member of the National Assembly for Romblon's lone district, founder of the Philippine Historical Association, and father of June 12 Independence Day.
- Jose P. Laurel - Third President of the Philippines; founder of Lyceum of the Philippines University
- Pilar Hidalgo-Lim - Social worker, educator, and civic leader
- Vicente Manansala - National Artist for Visual Arts (Painting)
- Diomedes Maturan - "Perry Como" of the Philippines
- Fe Del Mundo - 1977 Ramon Magsaysay Awardee for public service
- Ricardo Paras - Former Chief Justice of the Supreme Court
- Elpidio Quirino - Sixth President of the Philippines
- Narciso Ramos - Former member of the National Assembly for Pangasinan's fifth district and father of former President Fidel Ramos
- José E. Romero - Secretary of Education; first ambassador extraordinary and plenipotentiary of the Philippines to the Court of St. James's; senator-elect of the First Congress of the Philippines; representative of Negros Oriental's second district; father of Eddie Romero, National Artist of the Philippines for cinema and broadcast arts, and Jose V. Romero Jr., former Philippine ambassador extraordinary and plenipotentiary to Italy
- Rosa del Rosario - actress
- Carlos P. Romulo - Secretary of Foreign Affairs; fifth President of the United Nations General Assembly
- Manuel Roxas - Fifth President of the Philippines.
- Hilary Clapp - doctor and politician. He is the first Igorot to serve in the Philippine Legislature.
