= Teodoro Agoncillo =

Filipino historian (1912–1985)

Teodoro Agoncillo ONS
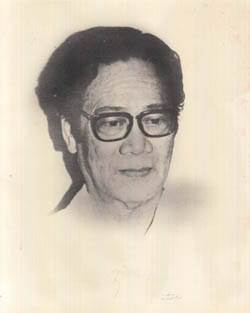
- Official portrait from National Academy of Science and Technology

8th Chairperson of the University of the Philippines Diliman Department of History
- In office 1963–1969
- Preceded by: Guadalupe Fores-Ganzon
- Succeeded by: Oscar M. Alfonso

Personal details
- Born: Teodoro Andal Agoncillo; November 9, 1912 Lemery, Batangas, Philippine Islands
- Died: January 14, 1985 (aged 72) Manila, Philippines
- Resting place: San Agustin Church, Intramuros, Manila, Philippines
- Education: University of the Philippines Manila (BA, MA)
- Occupation: Historian; educator; essayist; poet
- Awards: Order of National Scientists of the Philippines (1985)

Teodoro Andal Agoncillo (November 9, 1912 – January 14, 1985) was a Filipino historian from the 20th century. He and his contemporary, Renato Constantino, were among the first Filipino historians renowned for promoting a Filipino nationalist historiography. Agoncillo was a professor at the University of the Philippines (UP) and chaired the UP Department of History from 1963 to 1969. His seminal work, The Revolt of the Masses: The Story of Bonifacio and the Katipunan (1956), recounts the early phase of Philippine Revolution led by Andrés Bonifacio's Katipunan. He also authored History of the Filipino People, a standard textbook first published in 1960. In 1985, Agoncillo was posthumously named a National Scientist of the Philippines.

== Early life ==
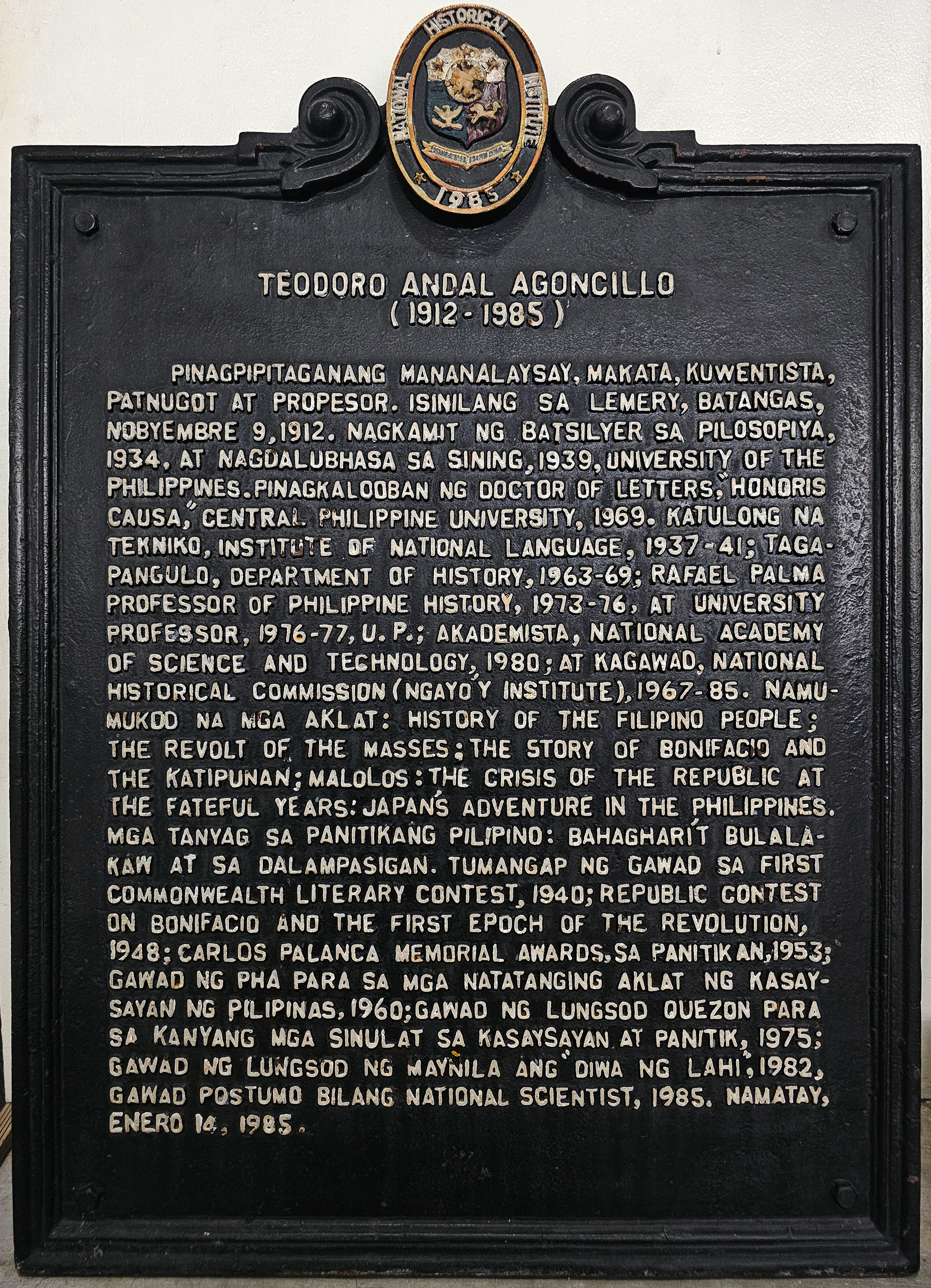
National historical marker created in 1985 and currently with the family

Agoncillo was born in Lemery, Batangas to Pedro Agoncillo and Feliza Andal, who both came from landed families in the province. Through his father, Agoncillo is related to Don Felipe Agoncillo, the Filipino diplomat who represented the Philippines in the negotiations that led to the Treaty of Paris (1898), and Doña Marcela Agoncillo, one of the principal seamstress of the Philippine flag.

Agoncillo obtained a bachelor's degree in philosophy from the University of the Philippines in Manila, in 1934, and a master's degree in the arts from the same university the following year. He earned his living as a linguistic assistant at the Institute of National Language and as an instructor at the Far Eastern University and the Manuel L. Quezon University. In 1956, he published his seminal work, Revolt of the Masses: The Story of Bonifacio and the Katipunan, a history of the 1896 Katipunan-led revolt against Spanish rule and its leader, Andres Bonifacio. He garnered acclaim for this book, as well as criticisms from more conservative historians discomfited by the work's nationalist bent.

In 1958, Agoncillo was invited to join the faculty of the Department of History of his alma mater, the University of the Philippines. He remained with the university until his retirement in 1977, chairing the Department of History from 1963 to 1969. After retiring from UP, Agoncillo taught Filipino history as a visiting professor at the International Christian University in Mitaka, Tokyo, Japan, for one year from 1977 to 1978. Philippine President Diosdado Macapagal named Agoncillo as a member of the National Historical Institute in 1963. He served in this capacity until his death in 1985. Agoncillo was chair of the History Department in the University of the Philippines at the same time period that his cousin, General Abelardo Andal, served as Commander (Chair) of the Reserve Officers' Training Corps of the same university.

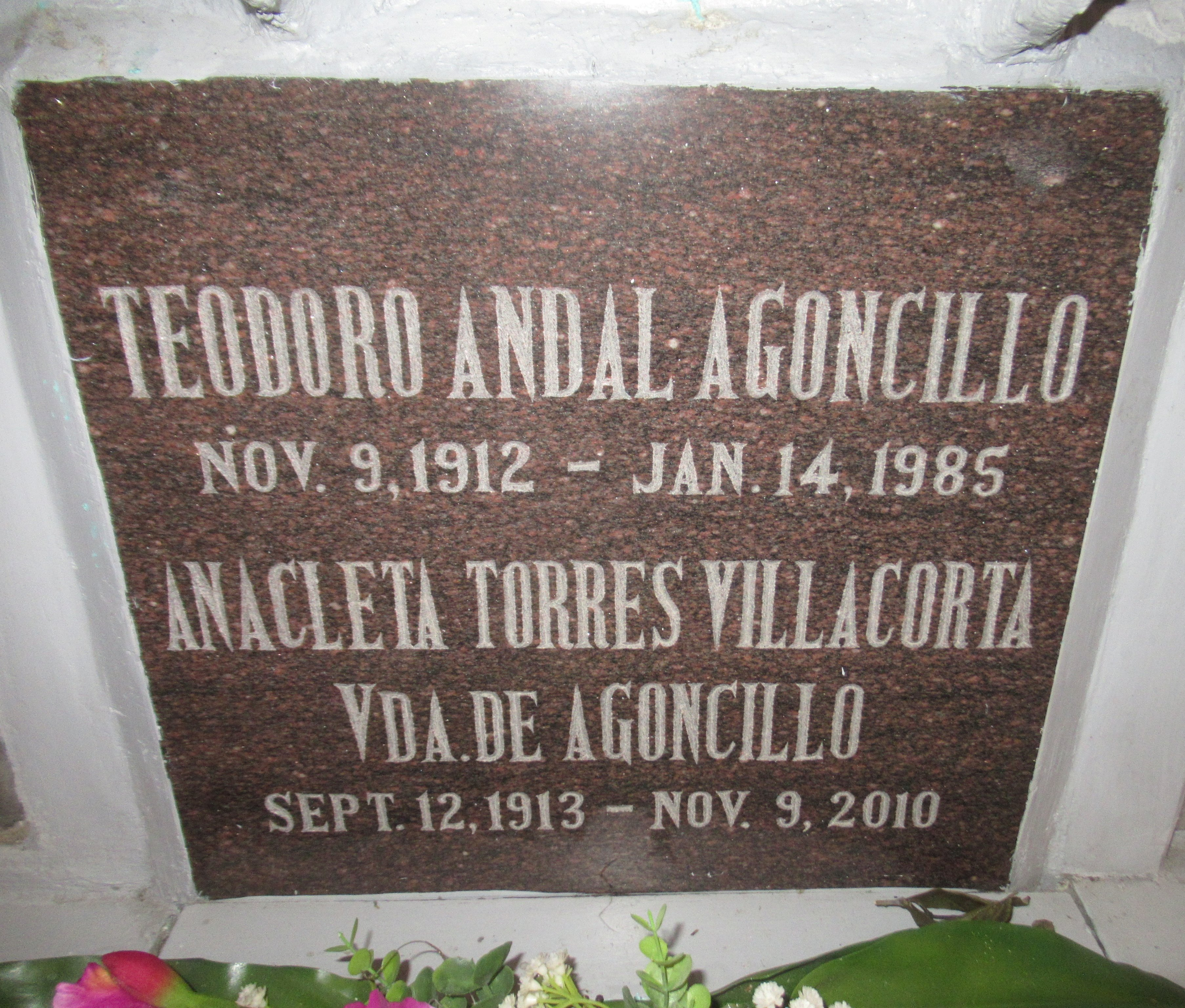
Anacleta Villacorta & Agoncillo's grave at San Agustin Church (Manila).

== Accolades ==
He was named National Scientist of the Philippines in 1985 for his distinguished contributions in the field of history. Agoncillo was also among the few academics who held the rank of University Professor, an academic rank given to outstanding faculty members with specialization in more than one of the traditional academic domains (Science & Technology; Social Sciences; and Arts & Humanities), at the University of the Philippines Diliman.

== Controversy ==
Despite Agoncillo's controversial tone and for his perceived leftist bent, his book, History of the Filipino People, first published in 1960, remains a popular standard textbook in many Filipino universities, as are many of Agoncillo's other works. Gregorio Zaide, Teodoro Agoncillo, Reynaldo Ileto and Renato Constantino stand as the most prominent 20th-century Filipino historians to emerge during the post-war period.

== Works ==
- Ang Kasaysayan ng Pilipinas (with Gregorio F. Zaide, 1941)
- Ang Maikling Kuwentong Tagalog: 1886-1948 (1949, 1965, 1970)
- The Revolt of the Masses: The Story of Bonifacio and the Katipunan (mainly a biography of Andres Bonifacio, 1956)
- Malolos: The Crisis of the Republic (sequel to Revolt of the Masses which discusses the events from Biak-na-Bato to the end of the Philippine–American War, 1960)
- History of the Filipino People (eight editions: 1960, 1967, 1970, 1973, 1977, 1984, 1986, 1990)
- The Writings and Trial of Andres Bonifacio (1963)
- The Fateful Years: Japan's Adventure in the Philippines (Philippine history during World War II, two volumes, 1965)
- A Short History of the Philippines (1969)
- Filipino Nationalism: 1872-1970 (1974)
- Introduction to Filipino History (1974)
- Sa Isang Madilim: Si Balagtas at ang Kanyang Panahon (1974)
- Ang Pilipinas at ang mga Pilipino: Noon at Ngayon (1980)
- The Burden of Proof: The Vargas-Laurel Collaboration Case (1984)
