= National Historical Commission of the Philippines =

Philippine agency on the country's history

- Abbreviation: NHCP
- Formation: 1933
- Type: Historical commission
- Headquarters: NHCP Building, T.M. Kalaw Avenue, Ermita, Manila
- Location: Manila, Philippines
- Coordinates: 14°34′52″N 120°58′42″E
- Chairperson: Regalado T. Jose Jr.
- Executive Director: Carminda R. Arevalo
- Parent organization: Office of the President of the Philippines
- Employees: 180 (2024)
- Website: nhcp.gov.ph

The National Historical Commission of the Philippines (NHCP; Filipino: Pambansang Komisyong Pangkasaysayan ng Pilipinas) is a government agency of the Philippines. Its mission is "the promotion of Philippine history and cultural heritage through research, dissemination, conservation, sites management and heraldry works." As such, it "aims to inculcate awareness and appreciation of the noble deeds and ideals of our heroes and other illustrious Filipinos, to instill pride in the Filipino people and to rekindle the Filipino spirit through the lessons of history."

== History ==
NHCP building in Manila

Chairman Regalado T. Jose, Jr. and Executive Director Carminda R. Arevalo in a marker unveiling ceremony.

While the current form of the NHCP was established in 1972 as part of the reorganization of government after President Ferdinand Marcos' declaration of martial law, its roots can be traced back to 1933 when the American colonial Insular Government first established the Philippine Historical Research and Markers Committee (PHRMC).

=== Philippine Historical Research and Markers Committee (1933) ===
The Philippine Historical Research and Markers Committee was created by U.S. Governor General Frank Murphy, by virtue of Executive Order 451, to identify and mark "historic antiquities" first in Manila, then throughout the Philippines, as a first step towards their preservation. The Church of San Agustin, Fort Santiago, Plaza McKinley, the Roman Catholic Cathedral of Manila, San Sebastian Church, Concordia College, Manila Railroad Company, Dr. Lorenzo Negrao, and University of Santo Tomas (Intramuros site) were among the first structures to be granted historical markers.

The installation of markers was first limited to identify antiquities in Manila. However, the commission's mandate was later expanded to cover the whole of the Philippines. Many markers were destroyed or lost due to World War II, along with the structures they represent, and many have been replaced by post-war markers.

This first committee was composed of American journalist Walter Robb, who served as chair; American Anthropologist H. Otley Beyer, who would later be known as the "father" of Philippine anthropology; Spanish Jesuit Fr. Miguel Selga, SJ; Dean Edward Hyde from the University of the Philippines College of Engineering; and Filipinos Jaime C. de Veyra, Conrado Benitez, and Eulogio Balan Rodriguez.

=== Philippines Historical Committee (1935) ===
With the establishment of the Philippine Commonwealth in 1935, President Manuel L. Quezon signed Executive Order No. 91 in 1937, creating the Philippines Historical Committee (PHC), which took over the functions as its predecessor, as well as the tasks of repairing government-owned antiquities and acquiring antiquities owned by private individuals. While there are extant historical markers issued in 1941 (e.g. Magellan's Cross, Basilica del Santo Niño, First shot of the Philippine-American War, Colegio de San Juan de Letran, & Malacañan Palace), there are no known records of the activities of the committee during the Japanese occupation of the Philippines during World War II, as the Committee closed in protest.

In the postwar reconstruction years the PHC was busy as there was a government interest in "the reconstruction of the past as a means to form nationhood." Reconstituted six months after Philippine independence in 1946, the committee was first placed under the Office of the President, and then transferred to the Department of Education. During this time, it installed over 400 historical markers all over the archipelago; named and renamed various streets, plazas, towns and other public places; and acquired places and relics of heroes.

As the nation rebuilt itself, a number of other historical commissions were also created by law to commemorate the birth centennials of various Philippine heroes of the late 19th century. All of these commissions were eventually merged into one National Heroes Commission created in 1963.

=== National Historical Commission (1965) ===
In July 1965, Congress passed Republic Act No. 4368 that created the National Historical Commission (NHC) and effectively abolished the Philippine Historical Committee and the National Heroes Commission whose functions were delegated to the NHC. Among the functions of the NHC are the following: to publish or cause to have written or published the works of our national heroes and other great and good Filipinos; to compile from various sources here and abroad data on Philippine history and prepare and publish there from source books on Philippine history; to identify, designate and approximately mark historic places in the Philippines and to cause the construction or reconstruction and to maintain and care for national monuments, shrines and historic markers that have been erected; to take charge of all historical activities or projects not otherwise undertaken by any entity of the government; to gather data on historical dates, personages, events, and documents presented for evaluation, and to acquire through purchase, donation, exchange or otherwise, important historical documents and materials; and to encourage researches in Philippine history and the writing and publication of textbooks on the subject, the research and writing of biographies of heroes, accounts of historical events, translations of important scholarly works of Filipinos and foreigners by providing appropriate or adequate incentives.

=== National Historical Institute (1972) ===
In 1972, President Ferdinand Marcos' declaration of martial law resulted in a reorganization of government and the renaming of the NHC as the National Historical Institute.

=== National Historical Commission of the Philippines (2010) ===
On May 12, 2010, President Gloria Macapagal-Arroyo signed Republic Act No. 10086, or the law reverting the National Historical Institute into its original form as the National Historical Commission of the Philippines.

== Current activities ==
The NHCP still undertakes all the functions of the previous commissions, most notably those of preserving historical sites and structures and serving as lead agency for the commemorations of Independence Day and Rizal Day.

Historical markers issued by the NHCP and its predecessors

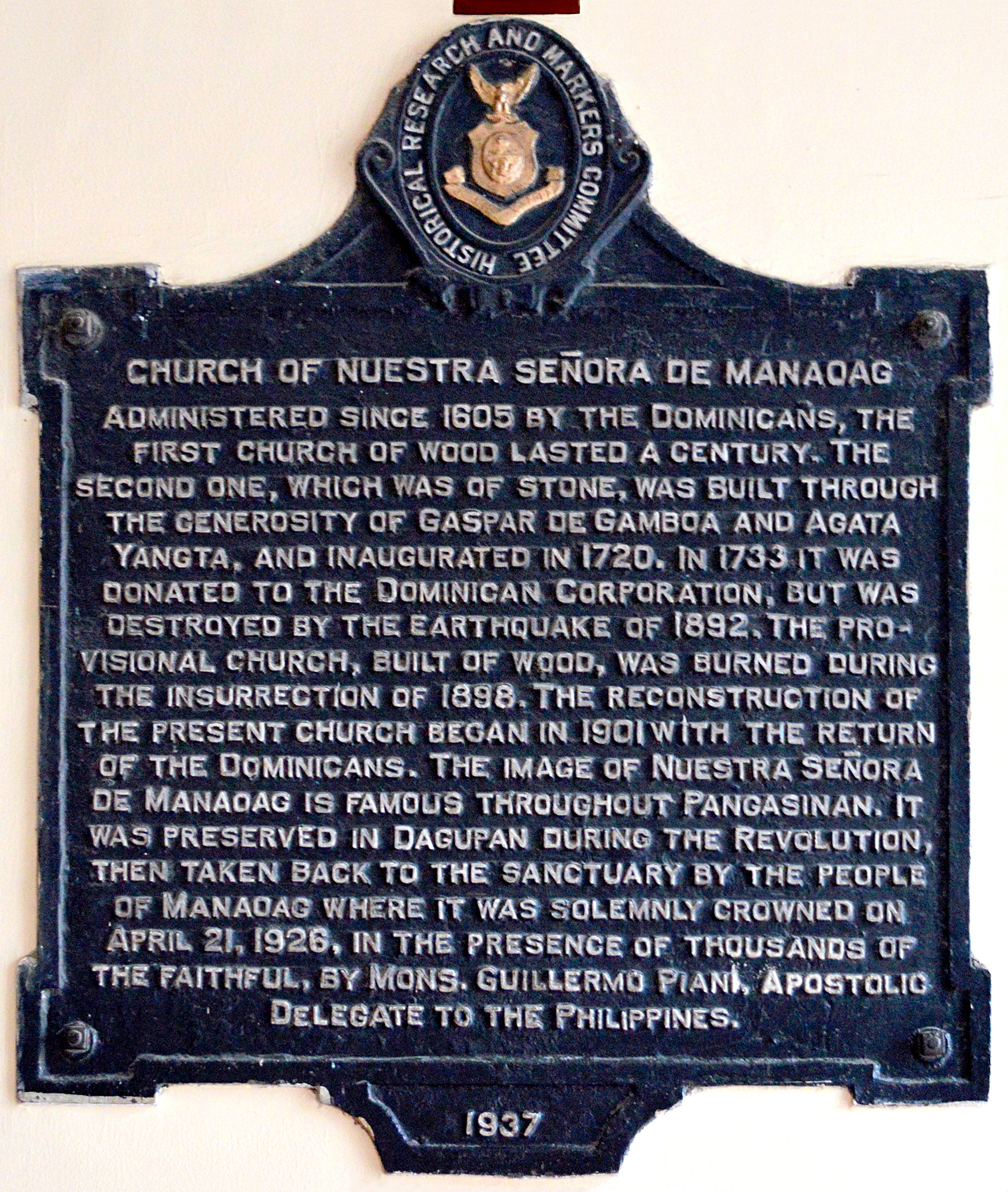
HRMC marker

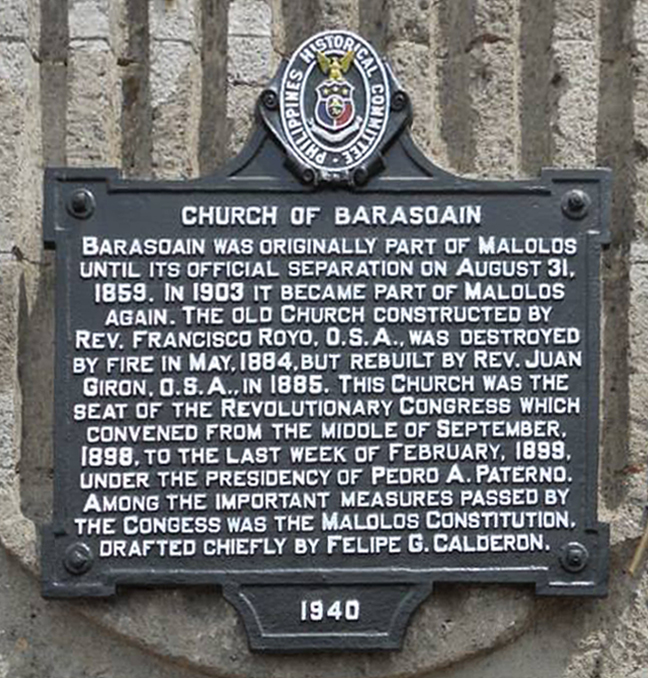
PHC marker

NHI marker

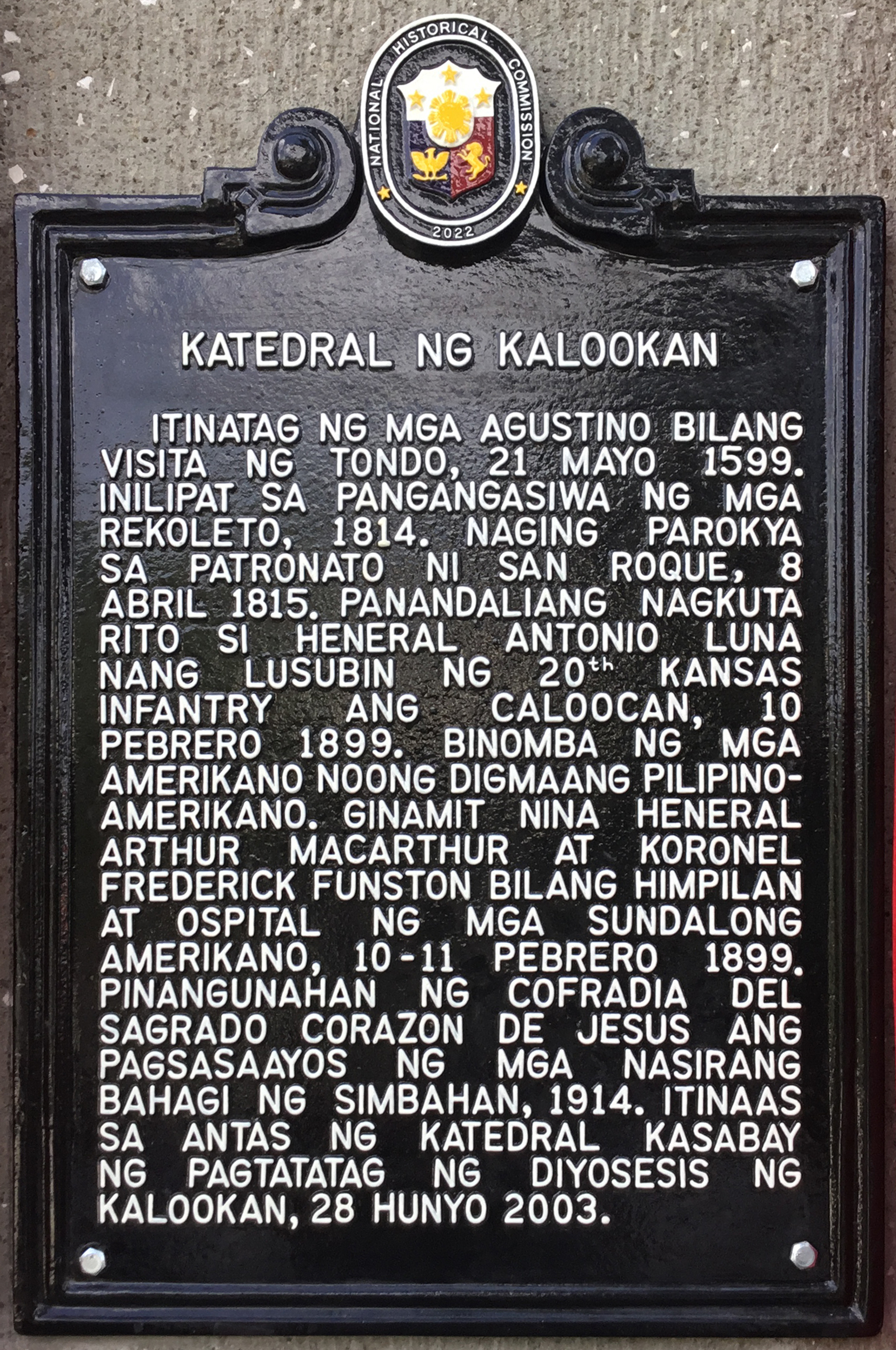
NHC marker

== List of chairpersons ==
No.	Image	Name	Term
1		Walter J. Robb	October 23, 1933 – January 19, 1947
2		Eulogio Balan Rodriguez	January 20, 1947 – April 3, 1949
3		Encarnacion Alzona	September 1966 – July 1967
4		Carmen Guerrero Nakpil	July 1967 – 1971
5		Esteban A. de Ocampo	1971 – January 1981
6		Serafin D. Quiazon	January 1981 – 1997
7		Samuel K. Tan	1997–1999
8		Pablo S. Trillana III	1999 – April 2002
9		Ambeth R. Ocampo	April 2002 – April 7, 2011
10		Maria Serena I. Diokno	April 7, 2011 – November 29, 2016
11		Rene R. Escalante	November 29, 2016 – March 1, 2023
12		Emmanuel Franco Calairo	March 1, 2023 – March 26, 2024
13		Lisa Guerrero-Nakpil	March 26, 2024 – July 12, 2024
13		Regalado T. Jose Jr.	July 12, 2024 – present

== List of executive directors ==
No.	Image	Name	Term
1		Danilo S. Manalang	1997 – December 2002
2		Ludovico D. Badoy	December 2002 – February 2020
3		Restituto L. Aguilar	February 2020 – February 22, 2021
4		Carminda R. Arevalo	February 22, 2021 – present

Notes:
- ^{A} Served as officer in charge of the Office of the Executive Director of the NHCP from February 22, 2021 to November 11, 2023.

== See also ==
- List of historical markers of the Philippines
- Philippine Historical Association
