= Gregorio F. Zaide =

Filipino historian (1907–1986)

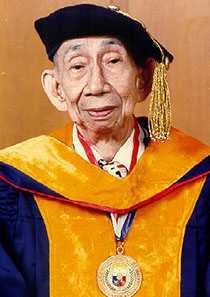

Mayor of Pagsanjan, Laguna
- In office 1971–1975

Personal details
- Born: May 25, 1907 Pagsanjan, Laguna, Philippine Islands
- Died: October 31, 1986 (aged 79) Manila, Philippines
- Spouse: Dolores Magbanua
- Children: 3
- Education: University of Santo Tomas (BA, PhD); University of the Philippines Manila (MA)
- Occupation: Writer; Author; Historian; Historiographer

Gregorio Fernandez Zaide (May 25, 1907 – October 31, 1986) was a Filipino historian, author, and politician from the town of Pagsanjan, Laguna, Philippines. A multi-awarded author, Zaide wrote 67 books and more than 500 articles about history, and is known as the "Dean of Filipino Historiographers." He was one of the founders of the International Association of Historians of Asia (IAHA), and president of the Philippine Historical Association for three terms. As a politician, he served as the mayor of his hometown of Pagsanjan from 1971 to 1975.

== Biography ==
Zaide was born in Pagsanjan, Laguna on May 25, 1907. He was known as "Goyo" to the people of his home town of Pagsanjan. He was married to Dolores (“Lily”) Magbanua.

He retired on May 25, 1964, and entered politics, winning as mayor of Pagsanjan from 1971 to 1975. While serving his post, he wrote a book about his town, Pagsanjan, In History and Legend, released in 1975 (of which excerpts are published in the town's official website). Dr. Gregorio F. Zaide died on October 31, 1986.

== Education ==
Gregorio Zaide's primary and secondary education were in the Spanish language, when it was the social language of the Philippines. He graduated valedictorian from Laguna High School (now called the Pedro Guevara Memorial National High School) in Santa Cruz, Laguna, in 1926. He obtained his Master of Arts in 1931 from the University of the Philippines Manila, and his Bachelor of Arts and Doctor of Philosophy degrees in 1934 from the University of Santo Tomas in Manila.

== Career ==
In his time, Zaide was the most traveled Filipino historian, with teaching and research stints at various universities and institutions in the Philippines and around the world. He worked at the University of the Philippines Diliman in Quezon City; at the University of Santo Tomas, San Beda College, University of Manila, and Far Eastern University in Manila. He also taught and researched for the University of Hawaiʻi and around the United States, as well as at the United Nations and around Asia. As a fluent speaker of the Spanish language, he worked in Mexico, and other Spanish-speaking countries in Latin America. He became a member of Instituto Histórico de la Independencia Americana (Historical Institute of American Independence) in Argentina and the Instituto Panamericano de Geografia e Historia (Pan American Institute of Geography and History) in Mexico.

Zaide was elected as president of the Philippine Historical Association and served in this capacity for three terms – between 1965–1966 and in 1971. He was also an active member of the American Historical Association based in Washington, D.C. He was a member of both the National Academy of Science and Technology (NAST) and the National Research Council of the Philippines (NRCP).

He was one of the founders of the International Association of Historians of Asia (IAHA). Dr. Zaide was a Paul Harris Fellowship of the Rotary Club.

In 1956, he wrote the screenplay for the Larry Santiago Productions' movie Heneral Paua, a movie about Jose Ignacio Paua, a Filipino–Chinese blacksmith turned general, a relatively unknown hero of the Philippine revolution.

He became the first Professor emeritus of History at the Far Eastern University after he retired in 1964.

== Legacy ==
The earliest editions of Zaide's books were standard texts studied by students during the Philippines' immediate post–WWII period, and became very influential because of their influence on the education of first generation after Philippine independence, and because some of these books continue to be released in updated editions.

Zaide's historical works are generally known for their lively prose – with Palanca laureate Butch Dalisay noting that his works were "as fascinating to him as a boy as any of Edgar Rice Burroughs’ 'Martian Chronicles'." In the same breath, however, these works are criticized as lacking in "the important qualifications and nuances to be made to telling the story of our past, such as the fact that histories unavoidably took sides, and that it was all too easy to be seduced into taking the wrong one."

In particular, Zaide has been criticized for portraying history in a way that put the Philippines' colonial experience under the Spanish and the Americans in an over-simplistically positive light.

Historian Ambeth Ocampo has noted that this "old-fashioned" style and perspective was simply reflective of historians of Zaide's generation, noting:

"Zaide may be old-fashioned to a generation that grew up with the works of nationalist historians Teodoro A. Agoncillo and Renato Constantino, but I have always appreciated his two-volume work "The Pageant of Philippine History". One may not find Zaide’s writing style or viewpoint to one’s taste, but in his footnotes he gives the interested reader the leads to follow up on in the primary sources."

== Major works ==
Zaide was a prolific writer and historian writing about 67 books, which were adopted as textbooks for high schools and colleges. He also authored more than 500 articles in history published in both national and international newspapers and academic journals.

Among his contributions to Philippine history are the following books:

- A Documentary History of the Katipunan (1931)
- History of the Katipunan (1939)
- Philippine Political and Cultural History (1949)
- Great Events in Philippine History (1951)
- The Philippine Revolution (1954)
- Jose Rizal: Life, Works and Writings (1957)
- History of the Filipino People (1958)
- World History (1965)
- Great Filipinos in History (1970)
- Jose Rizal: Asia's First Apostle of Nationalism (1970)
- The Pageant of Philippine History (1979)
- History of Asian Nations (1980)
- Jose Rizal: Life, Works, and Writings of a Genius, Writer, Scientist, and National Hero (with Sonia M. Zaide, 1983)
- Riquezas Filipinas en los Archivos de Mexico (Titled in Spanish language)

== Awards ==
Zaide was the first Asian to win the United Nations Study Award in 1957. He was awarded by the Philippine government the prestigious Republic Cultural Heritage Award in 1968.

His other awards includes:

- Diploma of Outstanding Writings on Filipino National Heroes
- A Special Prize in History in the 1940 Commonwealth Literary Contest
- Diploma of Distinction for research on the life and works of Dr. Jose Rizal, the Philippine national hero
- Distinguished Public Service Award

== Sources ==
1. Ortigas Foundation (2014), Guide to the Zaide Family Papers
