= Neferti Tadiar =

Filipino Author

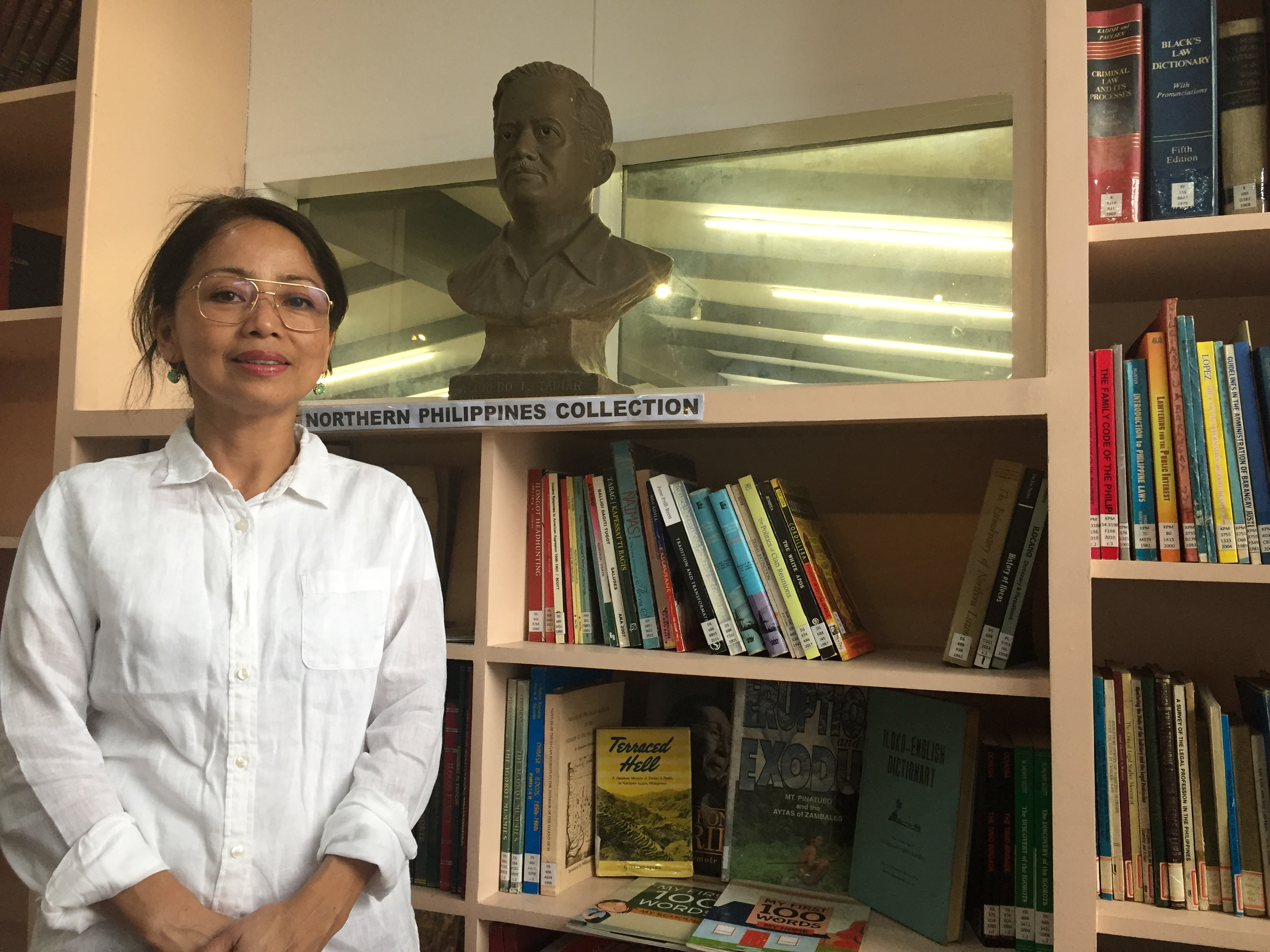
- Neferti Tadiar in 2019
- Born: Neferti X.M. Tadiar; 1964 (age 61–62); San Fernando, La Union, Philippines
- Citizenship: Filipino
- Awards: Philippine National Book Award 2005

Academic background
- Education: University of the Philippines Diliman (B.A.); Duke University (Ph.D.)

Academic work
- Discipline: Southeast Asian Studies, Gender Studies
- Institutions: Barnard College, Columbia University Professor and Chair of Women's, Gender & Sexuality Studies

Neferti X. M. Tadiar is a Filipino scholar and critical theorist. She is a professor of women's, gender, and sexuality studies at Barnard College, chair of the Barnard department of women's, gender, and sexuality studies, and director of the Columbia University Center for the Study of Race and Ethnicity.

== Early life and education ==
Neferti Tadiar was born in San Fernando, La Union to a lawyer, Alfredo Flores Tadiar. She attended the Philippine Science High School but diverted from her original plans to pursue the sciences and studied English and Comparative Literature at the University of the Philippines Diliman and at Duke University.

== Scholarly work ==
Professor Tadiar has taught at Barnard College since 2006 and is on the editorial board of the international cultural studies journal, Social Text. She is known for her work on postcolonial and Philippine studies in books such as Things Fall Away (2009) and Fantasy-Production (2004). She co-edited the collection Beyond the Frame: Women of Color and Visual Representation (2005) with Angela Davis.

Before joining the Barnard faculty, she taught at the University of California, Santa Cruz in the program on the History of Consciousness.

== Selected publications ==
- Things Fall Away: Philippine Historical Experience and the Makings of Globalization (Duke University, 2009).
- Beyond the Frame: Women of Color and Visual Representation, co-edited with Angela Y. Davis (Palgrave Press, 2005).
- Fantasy-Production: Sexual Economies and Other Philippine Consequences for the New World Order (Hong Kong University Press/ Ateneo de Manila University Press, 2004).
- Remaindered Life (Duke University, 2022).

== See also ==
- Benedict Anderson
- Resil Mojares
- Caroline Hau
- Talitha Espiritu
- Reynaldo Ileto
- Zeus A. Salazar
