= Talitha Espiritu =

Filipino Author

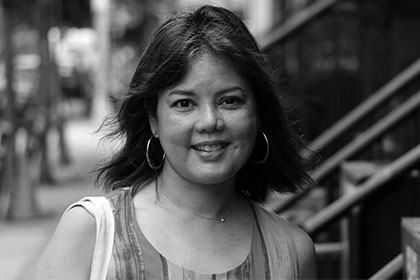
- Talitha Espiritu in 2019
- Born: Manila, Philippines
- Citizenship: Filipino
- Known for: Passionate Revolutions

Academic background
- Education: Ateneo de Manila (B.A.); New York University (Ph.D.)
- Doctoral advisor: Robert Stam

Academic work
- Discipline: Southeast Asian Studies, Cinema Studies
- Institutions: Wheaton College Associate Professor

Talitha Espiritu is a Filipino author and academic known for her work on cinema during the Marcos dictatorship. Espiritu teaches in the Film and New Media Studies program at Wheaton College in Norton, Massachusetts.

== Early life and education ==
Espiritu was born in Manila, Philippines to fashion designer Christian Espiritu, who served as Imelda Marcos's chief couturier and Gliceria Limcaoco, a former private school teacher. She received her B.A. in Communication Arts from the Ateneo de Manila University, her first M.A. from The John W. Draper Interdisciplinary Program in Humanities and Social Thought and her Ph.D. in Cinema Studies both from New York University. Before pursuing a career in the academe she was an art writer covering the Manila art scene from 1992-1995.

== Passionate Revolutions ==
Passionate Revolutions is the first book to examine how aesthetics and messaging based on sentimental narratives helped secure the dictatorship of Ferdinand Marcos and sustained the popular struggles that toppled it, culminating in the EDSA “people power” of 1986. According to Andrea Malaya M. Ragragio, Passionate Revolutions "expands the critical discussion of dictatorships in general and Marcos’s in particular by placing Filipino popular media and the regime’s public culture in dialogue."

== Published works ==
- Passionate Revolutions: The Media and The Rise And Fall Of The Marcos Regime. Athens, Ohio: Ohio University Press [Ohio University Research in International Studies, Southeast Asia Series 132], 2017, 276 pp. ISBN 9780896803121
- “The Marcos Romance and the Cultural Center of the Philippines: The Melodrama of a Therapeutic Cultural Policy,” Journal of Narrative Theory 45 no. 1 (Fall 2015).
- “Performing Native Identities: Human Displays and Indigenous Activism in Marcos’ Philippines,” in The Routledge Companion to Global Popular Culture, edited by Toby Miller, 417-425. London and New York: Routledge. 2015.
- “Native Subjects on Display: Reviving the Colonial Expositions in Marcos’ Philippines,” Social Identities 18 no. 6 (Fall 2012): 729-744.
- “Multiculturalism, Dictatorship and Cinema Vanguards: Philippine and Brazilian Analogies,” in Multiculturalism, Postcoloniality and Transnational Media, edited by Ella Shohat and Robert Stam, 279-298. New Brunswick: Rutgers University Press. 2003.
- “National Allegory, Modernization and the Cinematic Patrimony of the Marcos Regime,” in John Lent and Lorna Fitzsimmons eds. Popular Culture in Asia: Memory, City, Celebrity(Forthcoming from Palgrave, 2013).

== See also ==
- Benedict Anderson
- Resil Mojares
- Caroline Hau
- Neferti Tadiar
- Reynaldo Ileto
- Zeus A. Salazar
