= Ramon Guillermo =

Filipino academic (born 1969)

- Born: 1969 (age 56–57); Manila, Philippines
- Citizenship: Filipino
- Known for: Ang Makina ni Mang Turing, Translation and Revolution: A Study of Jose Rizal's Guillermo Tell, 3 Baybayin Studies, critique of Pantayong Pananaw

Academic background
- Education: University of the Philippines Diliman (B.A., M.A.); University of Hamburg (Ph.D.)
- Doctoral advisor: Rainer Carle
- Other advisor: Zeus Salazar

Academic work
- Discipline: Southeast Asian Studies, Philippine Studies, Digital Humanities
- Institutions: University of the Philippines Diliman

Ramon Guillermo is a Filipino novelist, translator, poet, activist, and academic in the field of Southeast Asian Studies.

== Life and works ==
Ramon "Bomen" Guillermo was born in 1969 in Manila, Philippines to poet Gelacio Guillermo and art historian Alice Guillermo. A graduate of Philippine Science High School, he received his B.A. and M.A. in Philippine Studies from the University of the Philippines Diliman, and his Ph.D. in Southeast Asian Studies (Austronestik) from University of Hamburg in Germany. Guillermo taught for many years at the UP Department of Filipino and Philippine Literature before transferring to the Center for International Studies at UP Diliman. He also serves as a fellow of the UP Institute for Creative Writing. A long-time activist, in 2018 he was elected for a two-year term as the faculty representative to the Board of Regents of the University of the Philippines, the highest governing body of the university.

In 2013, he published the novel entitled Ang Makina ni Mang Turing. The plot of this work of historical fiction revolves around the game of sungka or Southeast Asian mancala. The novel was reviewed by scholar Caroline Hau, noting how Guillermo has "breached the 'great divide' between ilustrados and 'the masses' that haunts Philippine literature." He is known for his academic writings which include studies on Southeast Asian radical intellectual history, critiques of the Pantayong Pananaw school of Zeus A. Salazar, various works on Jose Rizal, and studies on Philippine indigenous writing systems which include the Tagalog script called baybayin. He has translated Karl Marx and Walter Benjamin from German into Filipino, as well as Pramoedya Ananta Toer and Tan Malaka from Indonesian into Filipino, among others.

He is also a practitioner of digital humanities in the Philippines. According to the critic and literary historian Resil Mojares, "In the Philippines, the value of digital or 'computational' criticism is demonstrated in the admirable work of Ramon Guillermo in the field of translation studies."

== Selected published works ==
- Kiri Asia Tenggara: Pembacaan Ulang atas Beberapa Tokoh dan Karya, edited by Jafar Suryomenggolo with essays by Ramon Guillermo, Loh Kah Seng, Teo Lee Ken, Yerry Wirawan, and Piada Chonlaworn (Jakarta: Marjin Kiri, 2021).
- Penerjemahan dan Penerimaan Kapital di Indonesia. Kata Pengantar oleh Yerry Wirawan, with Coen Husain Pontoh (Jakarta: IndoPROGRESS, 2019).
- 3 Baybayin Studies, with Myfel Joseph Paluga, Maricor Soriano and Vernon Totanes (Quezon City: University of the Philippines Press, 2017).
- Ang Diablo sa Filipinas: ayon sa nasasabi sa mga casulatan luma sa Kastila, with Benedict Anderson and Carlos Sardiña Galache (Quezon City: Anvil Publishing, 2014).
- Ang Makina ni Mang Turing (Quezon City: University of the Philippines Press, 2013).
- Hinggil sa Konsepto ng Kasaysayan ni Walter Benjamin, translated and annotated from German to Filipino (Quezon City: High Chair Press, 2013).
- Pook at Paninindigan: Kritika ng Pantayong Pananaw (Quezon City: University of the Philippines Press, 2009).
- Translation and Revolution: A Study of Jose Rizal's Guillermo Tell (Quezon City: Ateneo de Manila Press, 2009).
- Agaw-Liwanag: Mga Tula (Quezon City: Highchair, 2004).

== See also ==
- Benedict Anderson
- Alice Guillermo
- Gelacio Guillermo
- Caroline Hau
- Reynaldo Ileto
- Resil Mojares
- Zeus A. Salazar
