= Historiography of the Philippines =

The historiography of the Philippines includes historical and archival research and writing on the history of the Philippine archipelago including the islands of Luzon, Visayas, and Mindanao.

Before the arrival of Spanish colonial powers the Philippines did not actually exist. Southeast Asia is classified as part of the Indosphere and the Sinosphere. The archipelago has direct contact with China during Song dynasty (960-1279) and has been a part of the Srivijaya and Majapahit empires.

== Overview ==
Historiography of the Philippines refers to the studies, sources, critical methods and interpretations used by scholars to study the history of the Philippines. The Philippine archipelago has been part of many empires before the Spanish empire has arrived in the 16th century.

The pre-colonial Philippines uses the Abugida writing system that has been widely used in writing and seals on documents though it was for communication and no recorded writings of early literature or history Ancient Filipinos usually write documents on bamboo, bark, and leaves which did not survive unlike inscriptions on clays, metals, and ivories did like the Laguna Copperplate Inscription and Butuan Ivory Seal. The discovery of the Butuan Ivory Seal also proves the use of paper documents in ancient Philippines.

The arrival of the Spanish colonizers, pre-colonial Filipino manuscripts and documents were gathered and burned to eliminate pagan beliefs. This has been the burden of historians in the accumulation of data and the development of theories that gave historians many aspects of Philippine history that were left unexplained.<ref=SebastianUndated / /> The interplay of pre-colonial events, the use of secondary sources written by historians to evaluate the primary sources, do not provide a critical examination of the methodology of the early Philippine historical study.

== Organizations ==
Scholarly organizations and societies have been formed which usually hold conferences, publish journals and promote historical knowledge and studies.

=== Government agency ===
The National Historical Commission of the Philippines is a government agency of the Philippines whose mission is "the promotion of Philippine history and cultural heritage through research, dissemination, conservation, sites management and heraldry works and aims to inculcate awareness and appreciation of the noble deeds and ideals of our heroes and other illustrious Filipinos, to instill pride in the Filipino people and to rekindle the Filipino spirit through the lessons of history.

=== Professional association ===
The Philippine Historical Association is the largest professional association of historians in the Philippines founded in 1955 by a group of prominent Filipino historians which includes Encarnacion Alzona, Gabriel Fabella, Gregorio Zaide, Nicolas Zafra, Celedonio Resurreccion, Teodoro Agoncillo and Esteban de Ocampo.

=== Non-governmental organization ===
The Philippine Association for the Study of Culture, History and Religion is a Non-governmental organization founded in 2013. This group initiates, facilitates, and organizes conferences and other academic events. They disseminate information on scholarship and research opportunities and publication of journals, books, and newsletters in the national and international communities to increase awareness about Philippine culture, history, and religion.

== Pre colonial period ==
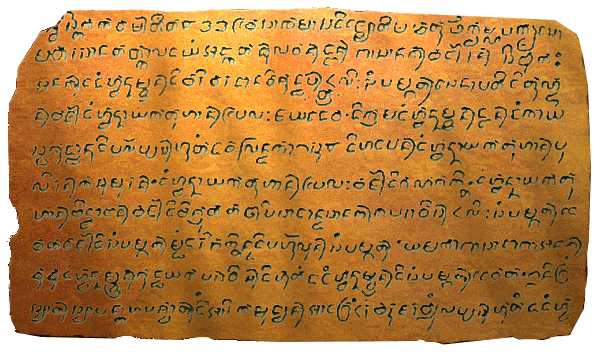
Laguna Copperplate Inscription

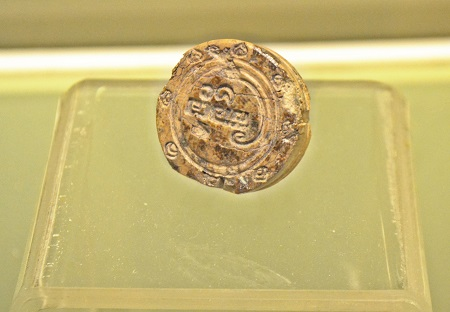
Butuan Ivory Seal

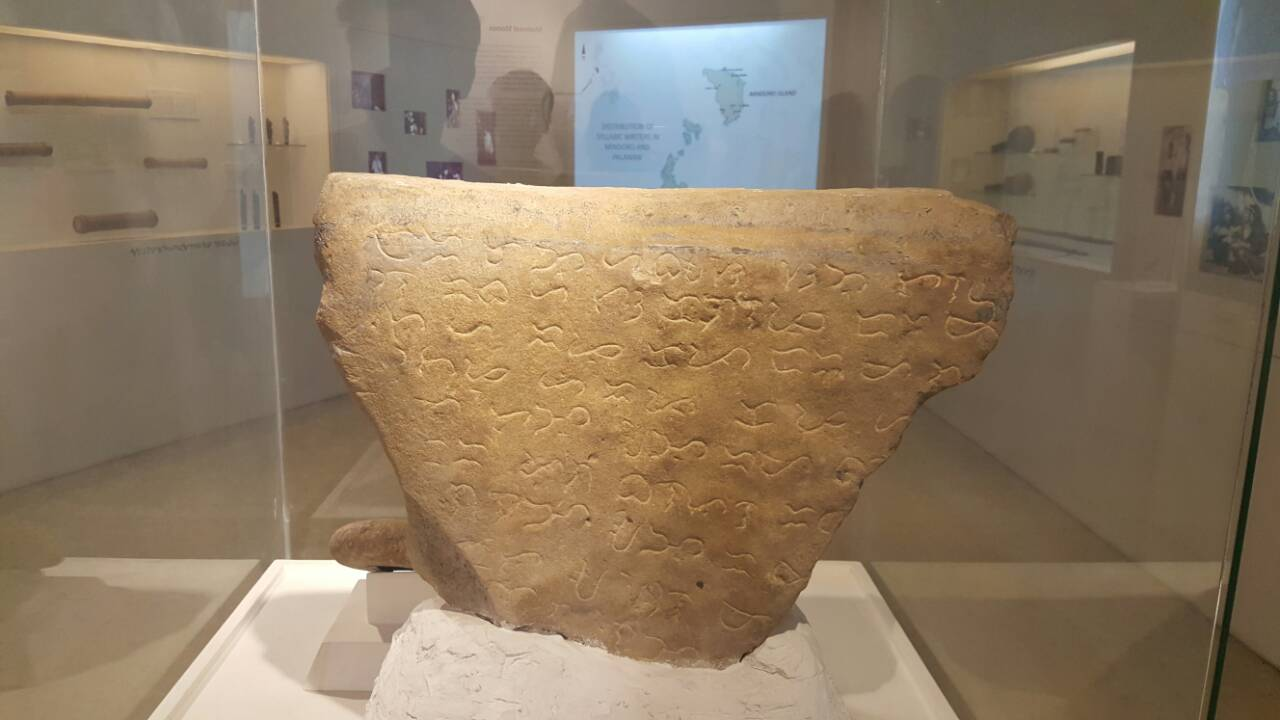
Monreal stone

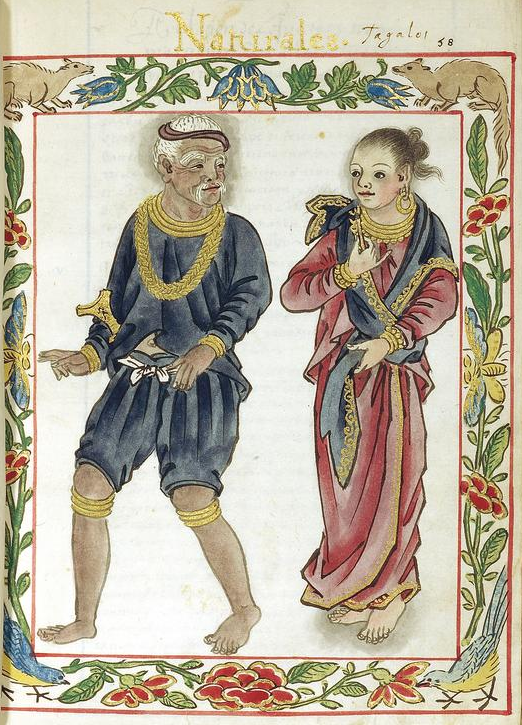
Pre-colonial Filipino noble couple

Indian culture has long reached the archipelago during the period of Pallava dynasty and the Gupta Empire that led to the Indianized kingdoms established in the Philippines. A clear evidence is the use of pre-colonial Philippines use of honorific titles. No other significant historical documents from this period except for Laguna Copperplate Inscription, a legal document inscribed on a copper plate dated 900 CE which is the earliest known calendar dated document found in the Philippines.

Ma-i, an ancient sovereign state located in what is now the Philippines is notable in the history of the Philippines for being the first place in the archipelago ever to be mentioned in any foreign account which was first documented in 971 AD, in the Song dynasty documents known as the History of Song. Its existence was also mentioned in the 10th-century records of the Sultanate of Brunei.

Until the year 1000 CE, maritime societies exists in the archipelago but there was no significant political state unifying the entire Philippines. The region included only numerous small administrative divisions (ranging in size from villages to city-states) under the sovereignty of competing thalassocracies ruled by datus, rajahs, sultans or lakans.

== Colonial period ==
The first recorded document that mentions the archipelago was Antonio Pigafetta's chronicle Report of the first trip around the world on his narrative record of the journey of a Spanish expedition in search of the Spice Islands published sometimes between 1524-1525.

Another notable document was Antonio de Morga's Sucesos de las Islas Filipinas published in 1609 based on the author's personal experience and documentations from eye-witnesses of the survivors of Miguel López de Legazpi's expedition.

Documents published are chronicles by the early Spanish explorers and navigators and religious records of Spanish friars of their Catholic mission during the Spanish colonial period.

=== Early chroniclers ===
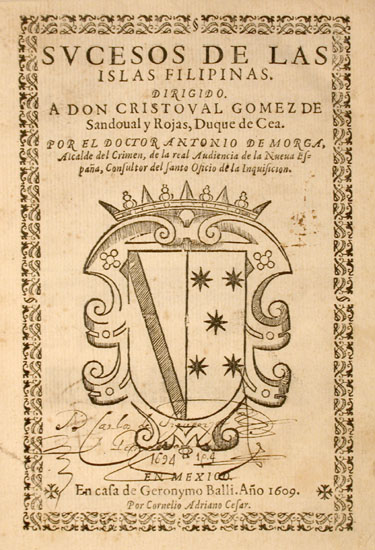
Sucesos de las Islas Filipinas

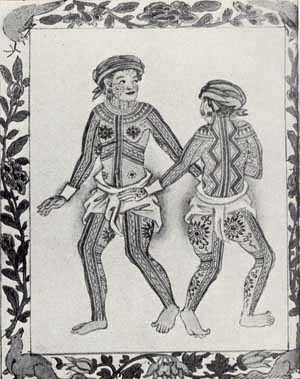
Boxer Codex Illustrations of tattooed Cebuanos

- Antonio Pigafetta
- Rodrigo de Aganduru Moriz
- Hernando de Riquel
- Miguel López de Legazpi
- Juan de Plasencia
- Pedro de San Buenaventura
- Pedro Chirino

=== Colonial Era Historians ===
- Antonio de Morga
- Emma Helen Blair and James A. Robertson
- Francisco Ignacio Alcina
- Francisco Colin, S.J.
- Felix Huerta, O.F.M
- Ferdinand Blumentritt
- Isabelo de los Reyes
- Jose Rizal
- Pedro Paterno
- Trinidad Pardo de Tavera

== Post colonial period ==
The historiography of the post-colonial period focused on the Philippine revolutions and the Philippine–American War as historians saw the colonial era as a prelude. The critical role played by the Filipinos in shaping the Philippine national history in this period is well highlighted and analyzed based on the accounts on the revolution and the Philippine–American War as it describes the social, economic, political, and cultural conditions of the Philippines.

Historian Reynaldo C. Ileto in his seminal work on Pasyon and Revolution: Popular Movements in the Philippines, 1840-1910, the historiography of the Philippine Revolution was explored in a new meaning. Historian Vicente L. Rafael introduced poststructuralist theories in the analysis of the colonial society on his Contracting Colonialism: Translation and Christian Conversion in Tagalog Society under Early Spanish Rule.

=== Writers and Historians from the Nationalist History tradition ===
- Teodoro Agoncillo
- Horacio de la Costa
- Gregorio Zaide
- O.D. Corpuz
- Cesar Adib Majul
- Nick Joaquin

=== Historians from the Critical Historiography tradition ===
- Carlos Quirino
- F. Landa Jocano
- Felix M. Keesing
- William Henry Scott
- Laura Lee Junker
- Damon L. Woods

=== Writers from the Folkloristics tradition ===
- Damiana Eugenio
- Gilda Cordero-Fernando
- Grace Odal-Devora

=== Historians and Writers from the Postmodern, Local/Ethnic History, and Religious History traditions ===
- Patricio N. Abinales
- Luis Camara Dery
- Go Bon Juan
- Bambi Harper
- Melba Padilla Maggay
- Ambeth Ocampo
- Vicente L. Rafael
- Luciano P.R. Santiago
