= Xiao Chua =

Filipino historian

- 曾華紹
- Chua in 2026
- Born: Michael Charleston Briones Chua; January 19, 1984 (age 42); Tarlac City, Philippines
- Occupations: Historian, Academic, TV host

Academic background
- Education: University of the Philippines Diliman (BA, MA, Ph.D.)
- Website: Official Website

Michael Charleston "Xiao" Briones Chua (Chinese: 曾華紹; pinyin: Zēng Huáshào; born January 19, 1984) is a Filipino historian, academic, and television personality.

He is best known for his academic works on Philippine history and his numerous appearances as a commentator on historical topics on Philippine television, including a regular appearance on a news segment called "Xiao Time" on the public television station People's Television Network. He has also served as a historical consultant for shows such as Katipunan, its companion show Ilustrado, as well as the TV documentary series History with Lourd.

He is currently a professor at De La Salle University and a leading member of the August Twenty-One Movement. He hails from the province of Tarlac.

== Bibliography ==
Books and Publications

- Bonifacio: Ang Unang Pangulo (2015) (co-authored with Milagros C. Guerrero)
- Pamana ng Ika-19 na Dantaon: Pagtatakdang Pangkasaysayan Bayani at Heroes sa Pagbubuo ng Bansa (2018) (co-authored with Floro Quibuyen, Zeus Salazar & Arvin Lloyd B. Pingul)
- Andres Bonifacio (2019) (co-authored with John Ray Ramos)
- It's All About Faces (2023) (co-authored with Corazon Alvina, Lisa Guerrero Nakpil, Cid Reyes, Carlomar Arcangel Daoana and Jerome B. Gomez)

== See also ==
- Resil Mojares
- Caroline Hau
- Zeus A. Salazar
