= Gelacio =

Gelacio is a given name. Notable people with the name include:

- Gelacio Guillermo (1940–2019), Filipino poet and critic
- Gelacio Montiel (born 1961), Mexican politician
