= Ileto =

Ileto is a surname. Notable people with the surname include:

- Rafael Ileto (1920–2003), general in the Philippine Army
- Reynaldo Ileto (born 1946), Filipino historian
