= Concerned Artists of the Philippines =

Cultural organization in the Philippines

- Formation: August 31, 1983
- Founder: Lino Brocka
- Headquarters: Quezon City
- Chairperson: Bibeth Orteza
- Vice Chairperson: Lisa Ito
- Affiliations: Bagong Alyansang Makabayan

The Concerned Artists of the Philippines (CAP) is a progressive organization of FiIlipino artists and cultural workers. It seeks to advance freedom of expression, nationalism, democracy, and justice. It is one of the country's leading cultural organizations.

It is affiliated with the Bagong Alyansang Makabayan (BAYAN).

== History ==
CAP traces its roots during the turbulent and repressive martial law era under the dictatorship of President Ferdinand Marcos Sr. The period was marked by limitations on freedom of repression and state violence against progressive artists and other opposition forces. A "Free the Artist, Free the Media Movement" was launched in February 1983 by more than 500 Filipino artists and media workers including Nick Joaquin, Bienvenido Lumbera, Pete Lacaba, Jo-Ann Maglipon, Sylvia Mayuga, Nic Tiongson, Alice Reyes, Santiago Bose, and Ray Albano. They campaigned against the plan of the president to expand the powers of the Board of Censors to become the Board of Review for Motion Pictures and Television thru Executive Order No. 868/876. Artists gathered at Liwasang Bonifacio in protest. A public meeting was held on July 9, 1983, which led to its formation, its first General Assembly on August 31 in Manila. Film director and National Artist Catalino "Lino" Brocka served as its founding chairperson until his death in 1991. Its logo was designed by social realist painter Edgar Talusan Fernandez.

Mike de Leon directed a CAP short video artwork called "Signos" (Omens) after the assassination of Ninoy Aquino. It was a collaboration among multidisciplinary disciplines of CAP members.

After this era, there was dormancy in the organization and was revived on June 17, 2000, in Quezon City. After which, the group remained active and participated in the Second EDSA People Power Revolt in January 2001.

CAP and Sinagbayan were able to convene Artists for Kidapawan, an artists group in response ot the Kidapawan massacre of 2016.

In 2019, CAP raised an alarm on the hijacking of the Armed Forces of the Philippines on the cultural affairs commemorating the 34th anniversary of the Escalante massacre. The group said that members have reported the presence of military officials among the meetings of the National Commission for Culture and the Arts.

CAP participated in the anti-corruption protests where artists were given anti-corruption prompts under "Koraptober", a portmanteau of "corruption" and "inktober".

== Principles ==
CAP emphasizes the role of art in social responsibility and advocates free speech and expression. The organization upholds art to be in solidarity with various sectors.

== Prominent members ==
- Ericson Acosta
- Ishmael Bernal, former board member
- Lino Brocka
- Imelda Cajipe-Endaya
- Behn Cervantes — coined the term "edifice complex"
- Mike de Leon
- Neil Doloricon, former Secretary General
- Alice Guillermo
- Pete Lacaba
- Joel Lamangan
- Bienvenido Lumbera
