= Inno Sotto =

Filipino fashion designer

Inno Sotto is a Filipino fashion designer known for his work in contemporary Philippine couture, his mentorship of emerging designers, and his involvement in cultural programs promoting the Filipino terno. Active since the late 1970s, he has presented couture and ready-to-wear collections in the Philippines and abroad, held leadership roles in designer organizations, and collaborated on heritage-centered fashion projects. In 2021, he was nominated for the National Artist Award for Fashion Design.

== Early life and education ==
Sotto originally intended to pursue architecture but became interested in fashion after assisting designer Christian Espiritu during a visit to Manila. He spent parts of his early life in Manila and the United States, and has said that early exposure to fashion shows influenced his career path. He has also credited his mother, Lily Sotto, for encouraging his interest in charitable work, particularly initiatives supporting disadvantaged children.

He pursued a liberal arts course at the University of San Francisco and later studied fashion at the San Francisco School of Fashion and Design and at Parsons School of Design in New York.

== Career ==
=== 1970s–1990s ===
Sotto began working in Manila’s fashion industry in the late 1970s. He opened his couture atelier in Malate in 1981 and later co-founded the Filipino Designers Group, serving as its president in 1987. That year, he presented his first major solo show, Inno Sotto: SOLO, at the Manila Hotel.

In the early 1990s, he expanded into ready-to-wear, launching the Luxe Wear – Numerals line in 1989 and opening a boutique in Greenbelt in 1990. Between 1993 and 1994, he presented collections in Singapore, Osaka, and Paris, staged the Filipiniana collection Inno Sotto: Filipino, and collaborated with National Artist Leandro Locsin and Japanese soprano Yoko Watanabe on costumes for a staging of Madame Butterfly. As president of the Fashion Design Council of the Philippines, he helped organize the first ASEAN Design Show in 1995, and later presented a couture collection at the Cercle de l’Union Interalliée in Paris.

In 1996, he worked on cultural and protocol projects for the APEC leaders’ spouses, including a state dinner at Malacañang Palace and a fashion presentation at the Metropolitan Museum Manila. He also developed “Manila Wear” for the Center for International Trade Expositions and Missions (CITEM), promoting Filipino fashion through audiovisual presentations shown abroad. In 1997, he participated in the 10th Fashion Convention in Singapore. His subsequent presentations included the Made to Dream gala (1998) and his first major bridal collection, Rituals (1999).

=== 2000s ===
In 2002, Sotto presented a couture collection during Unilever's Pond's event at the Manila Peninsula. In 2004, president Gloria Macapagal Arroyo appointed him UNESCO Commissioner for Arts and Culture. He later collaborated with French perfumer Charabot on the fragrance line Inno Sotto Mondo (ISM). Rustan Commercial Corporation later named him creative director.

=== 2010s ===
In 2010, Sotto celebrated his 30th year in fashion with the gala Thirty. Twenty. Ten at the Cultural Center of the Philippines. He and Richard Tann developed Fashion Watch, a designer presentation series revived in 2011. His designs continued to appear at major public events, including Heart Evangelista’s gown for the 2015 State of the Nation Address and pieces worn at the Philippine Tatler Ball in 2017. He served as a judge for the Preview Emerging Fashion Talent Awards in 2013 and became a head mentor for StyleFestPH in 2019.

=== 2020s ===
Sotto continued his involvement in terno education through TernoCon from 2017 onward.

== Notable collections ==
Sotto has presented several major couture and ready-to-wear collections, including Inno Sotto: SOLO (1987), Luxe Wear – Numerals (1989), Inno Sotto: Filipino (1993–1994), Made to Dream (1998), Rituals (1999), Two Decades of Modern Philippine Couture (1999), Around the Moon: Five Women (2002), Beloved (2005), Allegra under the Pink Sky of the Secret Garden (2006), and Alhambra (2007).

A gown he designed for actress Janine Gutierrez appeared at the 81st Venice Film Festival.

== Mentorship ==
Sotto has served as a mentor, juror, or program leader for TernoCon, StyleFestPH, PEFTA, Fashion Watch, and FAB Creatives programs.

== Awards and recognition ==
Sotto's recognitions include the Most Outstanding Designers Competition award (1980), the Outstanding Filipino Designer Award from the City of Manila (1988), the Evian Millennium Award (1999), and the MEGA Fashion Awards’ Designer of the Year distinction (2001). He was also nominated for the Order of National Artists for Fashion Design in 2001.

== Philanthropy ==
Sotto has staged charity-centered presentations supporting various causes. In 1992, he staged Inno Sotto: Anno XV gala for the Maria Lena Buhay Memorial Foundation. In 1993, he produced Inno Sotto: Filipino under the Cabinet Ladies Foundation to raise funds for the country’s first AIDS center. In 1999, he presented Two Decades of Modern Philippine Couture to support the Metropolitan Museum of Manila, followed by the restaging of Around the Moon as a benefit for the Amade–Virlanie Foundation. He later staged Beloved with performers from the Metropolitan Opera in New York to raise funds for the Virlanie Foundation.

== Personal life ==
Sotto’s long-term partner, Richard Tann, died in 2005. He later became the primary guardian of Joseph Marco, the grandson of his longtime caregiver. Beyond his design work, Sotto has supported humanitarian initiatives and has served as a goodwill ambassador for the Philippine National Red Cross. His charitable involvement includes organizations supporting children and vulnerable communities.
