= Protest art against the Marcos dictatorship =

Protest art against the Marcos dictatorship in the Philippines pertains to artists' depictions and critical responses to social and political issues during the presidency of Ferdinand Marcos. Individual artists as well as art groups expressed their opposition to the Marcos regime through various forms of visual art, such as paintings, murals, posters, editorial cartoons, and comics. Many forms of protest art carried themes of social realism, which art historian Alice Guillermo defines as art that aims to expose the true conditions of society. Popular forms of protest art also served as materials used in protest rallies. Many works of art represent struggles of the working class, such as workers and the urban poor, women's struggle, tribal Filipinos, the clergy and religious, and the antifascist, anti-colonial, and anti-imperialist struggles.

== Prominent artists and art organizations ==
Protest art against the Marcos dictatorship began during his first presidential term in 1965–1969. At the time it was closely associated with journalism and its daily reporting of social and political issues. Its earliest forms came as editorial cartoons in magazines and newspapers such as Philippines Free Press and Asia-Philippines Leader. One of top political cartoonists of the time was Danilo Dalena, who satirized public figures and criticized issues such as militarism, collusion with the U.S. government officials, and military abuses. Another prominent figure was Jaime de Guzman, who painted themes of nationalism on canvas and murals. One of his murals were painted in the Kabataang Makabayan headquarters, and carrying themes of Philippine anti-colonial revolutions which, for him, resonated with social struggles at the time. Benedicto Cabrera, or BenCab, also contributed significant work during this time. According to Alice Guillermo, his art presented elements of class-consciousness and nationalist themes, sympathizing with the social conditions of the masses.

The years 1970 to 1972 saw the formation of art organizations dedicated to criticizing the Marcos regime. Artists and architects from various colleges banded together to form the organization Nagkakaisang Progresibong Artista at Arkitekto (NPAA) or United Progressive Artists and Architects in 1971. NPAA's art was informed by the doctrines of Karl Marx, Vladimir Lenin, and Mao Zedong. The nature of their art was that it was "art for the masses". Members of NPAA immersed in depressed areas to interact with the people and to conduct workshops. Others went to the countryside to see the lives of the peasants and engage them in political education, at times linked with armed struggle.

In 1976, the art collective Kaisahan (Solidarity) was formed, emerging from Leftist efforts to mobilize the youth in the struggle against the "exploitative forces of US imperialism and its local agents". Kaisahan circulated a manifesto similar to the ideals of NPAA, which focuses on the formation and understanding of a national identity, opposing the Philippines' relationship with the West and its consequent westernization.

== Themes of social-realist art ==
=== 19th-century colonial history and revolution ===
Artists drew parallels between the revolution against the Spanish colonizers in the nineteenth century, and the struggle against the Marcos dictatorship. Both portrayed similarities in the history against oppressive powers and themes of national identity. Some examples include Benedicto Cabrera's Filipino Prisoners of War, A Public Execution, The Last March, and Brown Man's Burden. Orlando Castillo also painted images from the 19th century Philippine history, such as Sulat Kay Ina 1896. Renato Habulan painted a series of Sisa paintings, based on Jose Rizal's character who was a mother driven to madness after losing her two sons in colonial repression. Some of these include Sa Lupi ng Katahimikan ni Sisa (In the Fold of Sisa's Silence). Edgar Talusan Fernandez also represented themes from colonial history in his Gomburza, which depicts the three martyred priests.

=== Anti-imperialist struggle ===
According to Alice Guillermo, imperialism was often associated with images of the American Uncle Sam with his top hat, striped coat and pants, often as a puppeteer manipulating Philippine government officials. Many artists also represented the collusion of the American government with the Marcos dictatorship, often using U.S. presidents as icons. Orlando Castillo's Justice Under Martial Law presents Ferdinand Marcos partially covered by the American flag, while he also wears a barong tagalog. Uncle Sam's figure was found in many murals, posters, leaflets and effigies burn during protest rallies and demonstrations. Danilo Dalena employed the Uncle Sam theme in his editorial cartoon for the Asia-Philippines Leader. Kaisahan artist Pablo Baens Santos also employed anti-imperialist themes in his Panginoong Maylupa and Komprador, both showing U.S. collusion with local elites. Neil Doloricon's Lakas Paggawa is a collage of colored ads and logos of multinational products, beside figures of factory workers. In his painting Reagan, the American president oversees demolition and hamletting.

=== Workers and the urban poor ===
According to art historian Alice Guillermo, a large number of social realist paintings had themes of workers and labor power, and their relations within a colonial and feudal system. The exodus of Filipino migrant workers due to unemployment and underemployment during the Marcos administration also reflected in themes of protest art. In 1985, the Committee for the Advancement of Filipino People's Art (CAPFA) helped an exhibit entitled "A Tribute to Workers: Philippine International Art Exhibition 1", held in Broadway in New York City. It was primarily organized by sculptor Rey Contreras, painter Papo de Asis and Bob Ortaliz of the Kilusang Mayo Uno. Major themes about workers and their conditions are about alienation, images of workers, class contradiction, strikes, workers and machines, poverty, political oppression, and the plights of migrant workers. Antipas Delotavo's series Mga Kaluluwang Di-Masinagan (Souls in Darkness) portrays dialectic between man as a worker alienated from his humanity. Delotavo also painted Piping Tagulaylay (Mute Lament) and Bulong na Umaalingawngaw (Echoing Whisper), which are also concerned with the theme of the urban poor. Pablo Baen Santos's Komprador and Welga are both about labor strikes, which occurred frequently during the 1980s. Labor strikes was also the subject matter of other paintings, such as Neil Doloricon's Huling Balita (Last News), Wanted: Dead or Alive, Itaas ang Sahod (Increase Wages), and Hinagpis (Grief).

=== Struggle against feudalism and the exploitation of farm workers ===
Art that represented peasants and farm workers during the Marcos administration were often social realist in nature, protesting the feudal and exploitative conditions in the countryside. Aside from portraits of peasants, many artists aimed to invoke a greater sense of class consciousness. Benedicto Cabrera's Ang Tao (The Man) was part of his series of paintings and prints inspired by old Philippine photographs. It depicts the Filipino peasant, one whose economic oppression has not changed through history. Renato Habulan also depicted peasants and farm workers in his Lakas Series in 1981. Pablo Baen Santos has also painted numerous paintings of peasants, such as Panginoong Maylupa (Landlord). It portrays a landlord in collusion with an American and other foreign powers, reflecting labor and agricultural issues of the time, where the Philippines exported raw materials and agricultural products, but imports costly finished products in return. The plight of the Sugar Plantation Workers was also a theme of social realist paintings. They often depicted the contrast between the two social classes, as seen in the sakada, or farm worker and the landlord. Renato Habulan's show Dulo't Dulo (Polarities) was a series of paintings that showed the contrast between the landlord and peasant, and the comprador capitalist and farm worker. Antipas Delotavo's show Mga Bayaning Di-Kilala (Unknown Heroes) had content from his exposure trip to Hacienda Luisita. His paintings portrayed sugar workers, cargadores of cane stalks, train operators, machinists and their families.

=== Indigenous Filipinos ===
Under the Marcos administration, PANAMIN, or Presidential Assistance on National Minorities, was in charge of protecting the rights of the national minorities. However, in many cases, the commission supported the affairs of business corporations in detriment of the lives of the minorities. In Abra in Northern Luzon, the logging corporation called Cellophil Resources displaced thousands of Tinggians from their ancestral lands. In Mindanao, Del Monte Corporation's Philippine subsidiary displaced 14,000 indigenous Bukidnons with the help of the military and PANAMIN. Artists stood in solidarity with the indigenous peoples by spreading awareness of their issues. Renato Habulan created a Cordillera series, referring to the people's resistance against the Chico River Dam Project. His Ala-ala kay Makli-ing (Memory of Macli-ing) is a homage to Macli-ing Dulag, the leader of the Kalinga people who led the resistance against the Chico River Dam Project. Santiago Bose created a mixed media work entitled Bury My Heart in Chico Dam, sympathetic to the struggle of the Cordilleran peoples. Rey Paz Contreras created a sculpture series entitled Sacred Land, created from aged wood from discarded railroad ties, animal bones and skulls, old tools and weapons and tribal textiles.

== See also ==
- Timeline of the Marcos dictatorship
- Alice Guillermo
- Protest music against the Marcos dictatorship
