= Zeus A. Salazar =

Filipino historian

Zeus Salazar
- Born: Zeus Atayza Salazar; April 20, 1934 (age 92); Tiwi, Albay, Philippine Islands
- Occupation: Historian
- Known for: Pantayong Pananaw, Father of New Philippine History and New Philippine Historiography, Tasaday hoax exposition
- Children: Irineo Salazar, Wigan Salazar, Ligaya Salazar
- Awards: Chevalier dans l'Ordre des Palmes Academiques

Academic background
- Education: University of the Philippines Diliman (BA); University of Paris (PhD)
- Doctoral advisor: Roger Bastide

Academic work
- Institutions: University of the Philippines Diliman
- Main interests: Southeast Asian History, Archaeology
- Notable works: Ang Pilipinas sa Dunia Melayu
- Notable ideas: Pantayong Pananaw
- Influenced: Prospero Covar, Michael Charleston Chua, Ramon Guillermo

Zeus Atayza Salazar (born April 20, 1934) is a Filipino historian, anthropologist, and philosopher of history, best known for pioneering an emic perspective in Philippine history called Pantayong Pananaw (The "We" Perspective), earning him the title "Father of New Philippine Historiography." He is a major player in the indigenization campaign in the Philippines. Salazar spent 30 years teaching at University of the Philippines Diliman and held both history department chair and college dean positions.

== Education and early career ==
Salazar was born on 29 April 1934 in Tiwi, Albay, the eldest of seven children. His father was the town's first lawyer. Salazar attended El Colegio de San Beda for primary school and Albay High School for secondary, then earned a BA in history from the University of the Philippines, Diliman (UP) in 1955. He was the history program's first graduate to achieve summa cum laude.

After working as an assistant history instructor at UP for a year, Salazar went to Paris, where he stayed for 12 years (1956–1968) for his graduate studies. He completed his dissertation, Le concept AC+ 'anitu' dans le monde austronesien: vers l'etude comparative des religions ethnique austronesiennes (The Common Austronesian Anitu in the Austronesian World: Toward a Comparative Study of the Ethnic Austronesian Religions) under Roger Bastide. While there, he also earned a number of diplomas and licenses from National Institute for Oriental Languages and Civilizations, Musée de l'Homme, and Sorbonne in a number of topics, including French, Russian, Malay-Indonesian language, linguistics, history of religion, prehistoric archaeology, ethnology, and cultural anthropology in Oceania. By the time he left France, he could speak and write in Spanish, French, German, Russian, Indonesian, and other languages.

== Return to UP ==
Salazar left Paris in 1968 and returned to the Philippines, where he rejoined UP's history department. He taught in Filipino, continuing a tradition started by his mentor Guadalupe Fores-Ganzon in 1965. He worked closely with scholars in the College of Social Sciences and Philosophy, including Virgilio Enriquez and Prospero Covar. From this work, he became one of the main figures in the university's indigenization movement and became a founding member of Pambansang Samahan sa Sikolohiyang Pilipino (National Association of Filipino Psychology) in 1975 with Enriquez, Covar, and philosopher Leonardo Mercado.

== Work during the 1970s ==
=== Critique of the Tasaday "discovery" ===
In the 1970s, Salazar was among a number of scholars who questioned the validity of whether the recently discovered Tasaday people had indeed developed their civilization completely isolated from the Philippines since the Stone Age. He and anthropologist Jerome Bailen called the "discovery" a hoax perpetrated by President Ferdinand Marcos to increase tourism.

=== Participation in the Diliman Commune and detention in Fort Bonifacio ===
His participation in the Diliman Commune increased tensions; when Marcos declared martial law in 1972, Salazar was imprisoned. He shared a cell with historian William Henry Scott, with whom he had many disagreements and arguments. Butch Dalisay was a prisoner in the same block and reportedly drew caricatures of Scott and Salazar in his 1992 novel Killing Time in a Warm Place. Salazar's three-year sentence was reduced to three months after his friend Leticia Ramos-Shahani, sister of future president Fidel V. Ramos, became involved.

=== Ghostwriting Tadhana ===
Along with other historians, including Serafin Quiason Jr., Samuel K. Tan, Fe Mangahas, and Reynaldo Ileto, Salzar began ghostwriting Tadhana: The History of the Filipino People, a multi-volume history book commissioned by Marcos. His participation was controversial, with some accusing him of colluding with Marcos, while others believed Salazar was using Marcos to further his studies. Professor Portia Reyes from the National University of Singapore pointed out that "participation in the project allowed [Salazar] to conduct research, to travel abroad and to contribute to the production of scholarly tomes." Salazar himself argued that the commissioner does not matter so long as the project is for the common good.

== Chairmanship of the UP history department ==
Salazar became chairman of UP's history department in 1987. He led the first national conference in Filipino historiography, which produced the proceedings Paksa, Paraan, Pananaw sa Kasaysayan (Topic, Method, and Perspective in History). He also organized a colloquium on the use of Filipino in social sciences and philosophy, which became a collaboration between several of UP's colleges. He left this role in 1989 after being appointed dean of the College of Social Sciences and Philosophy, a role he held until 1992. During this time, he mandated that Filipino be used in all official transactions within the college and changed the name of the Philippine Studies PhD program to the Pilipinolohiya PhD program, a switch that changed perspectives employed in the field. His self-reflective approach to studying Pilipinolohiya, Pantayong Pananaw, became the ruling school of thought within the college.

== Retirement from UP and later career ==
Salazar retired from UP in 2000 after 30 years of teaching. Changes in administration meant that Pantayong Pananaw was challenged, which alienated a number of scholars in this area of study. Some moved to De La Salle University, where Salazar taught psychology between 2000 and 2005. Salazar argued that the eradication of Pantayong Pananaw at UP was not necessarily a bad thing, as it disseminated the practice to other institutions such as De La Salle, Philippine Normal University, National Teachers College, University of Makati, and Polytechnic University of the Philippines. Pantayong Pananaw has made it beyond the higher education system and is taught in some senior high schools as part of social sciences. In 2018, he taught historiography and philosophy of history at Polytechnic University of the Philippines for two semesters.

== Selected publications ==
Salazar has written or co-written more than 32 books and 125 articles during his career. An anthology of his essays, Pantayong Pananaw: Ugat at Kabuluhan, was compiled by students and colleagues and published in 1997. Two festschriften were written about him in 2015.

- 1969: Anthropology: Range and Relevance
- 1989: Unang Pagtingin sa Pelikulang Bakbakan
- 1990: Kabihasnang Asyano: Isang pangkasaysayang introduksyon (Asian civilization: A historical introduction)
- 1993: Kasaysayan ng Pilipinas: Isang Balangkas
- 2000: Manipesto ng Partido Komunista and Pagguho ng Troya
- 2004: Ang Saysay ng Inskripsyon sa Binatbat na Tanso ng Laguna and Liktao at Epiko: Ang Takip ng Tapayang Libingan ng Libmanan, Camarines Sur
- 2004: Sikolohiyang Panlipunan at Pangkalinangan
- 2005: Pangulong Erap: Biograpiyang Sosyo-Pulitikal at Pangkalinangan ni Joseph Ejercito Estrada
- 2006: Pilipinong Banua/Banwa sa Mundong Melano-Polinesyano (The Philippines in the Melano-Polynesian world)
- 2010: Asya: Kasaysayan at Kabihasnan and Kabihasnang Asyano: Isang Pangkasaysayang Introduksyon
- 2018: Mga Tula ng Pag-iral at Pakikibaka. Salin at Akda.

== Honors and awards ==
- Ordre des Palmes académiques - chevalier
- Pagkilala Award from the Pambansang Samahan sa Sikolohiyang Pilipino (National Association of Filipino Psychology)
- Pagkilala Award from the Linangan ng mga Wika sa Pilipinas (Institute of Philippine Languages)
- Lope K. Santos Award from the Sentro ng Wikang Filipino at UP
- Bayani ng Wika from Wika ng Kultura at Agham Ink
- Pambansang Alagad ni Balagtas Award from the Unyon ng mga Manunulat sa Pilipinas
- Most Outstanding Bikolano Artist for Literary Arts from the Bicol Regional Council for Culture and the Arts
- Tiwi Coron Festival Award 2010 from the Local Government of Albay
- Most Distinguished Bedan from the Unibersidad ng San Beda
- Kalatas Award from the Politeknikong Unibersidad ng Pilipinas
- BAKAS Award by the Bagong Kasaysayan, Inc.
- 2017: Prime Mover of the Pan-Malayan Identity from the Kapisanang Pangkasaysayan ng Pilipinas
