= BenCab Museum =

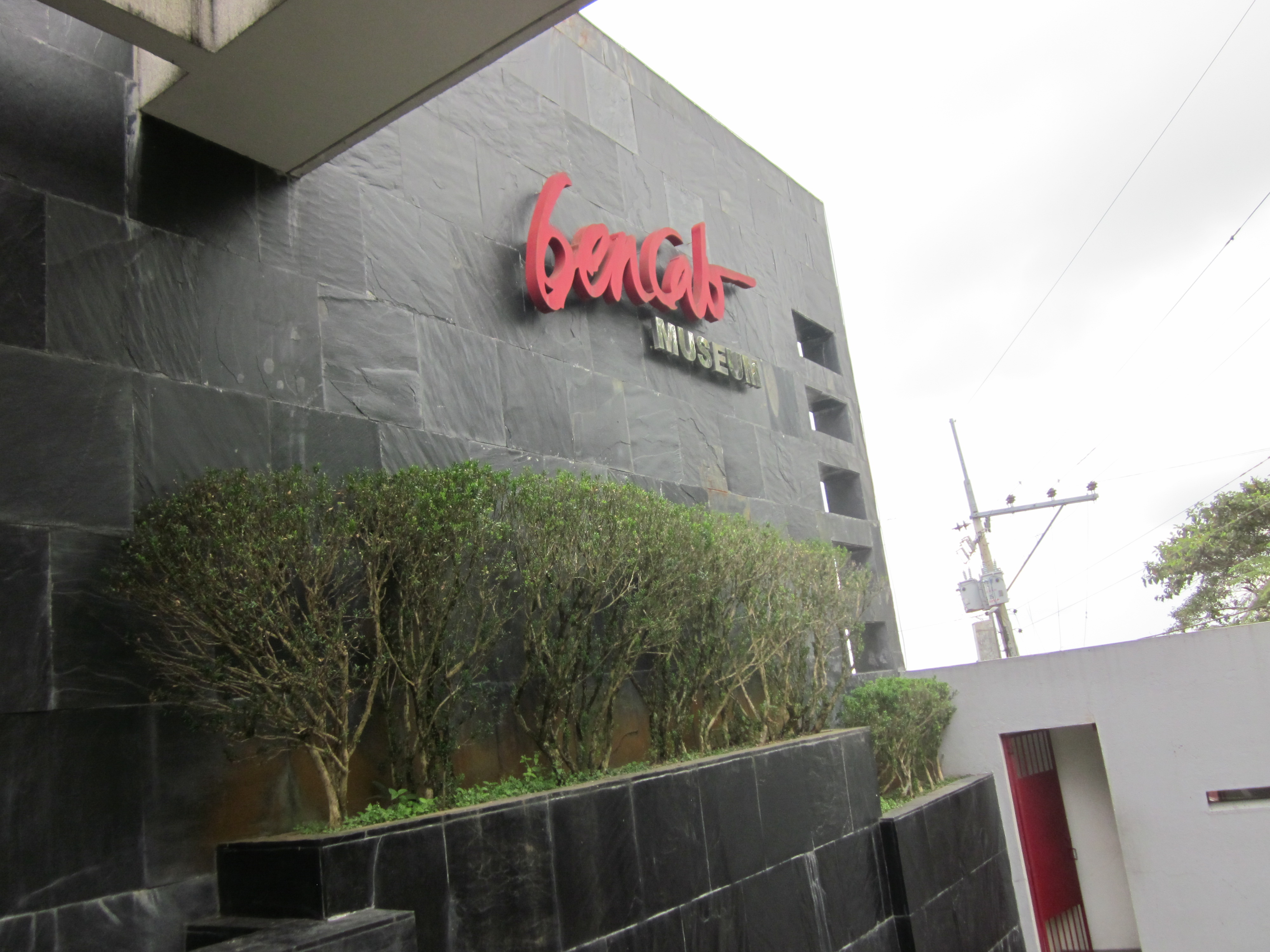
- Established: 2009
- Location: Tuba, Benguet, Philippines
- Coordinates: 16°24′37.9″N 120°33′01.6″E
- Type: Art museum
- Founder: Benedicto Cabrera
- Curator: Benedicto Cabrera
- Owner: BenCab Art Foundation
- Website: www.bencabmuseum.org

The BenCab Museum is an art museum in Tuba, Benguet, Philippines.

== Background ==
The construction of the BenCab Museum's building began in 2006. The museum institution itself was established in 2009 by National Artist Benedicto Cabrera with the BenCab Art Foundation managing the facility.

Cabrera intended to establish a private museum to host his personal art collection consisting his own works, Cordilleran indigenous art which he considers as underappreciated, erotica, and works of other artists that appealed to him.

== Facilities ==
The BenCab Museum is hosted within a four-storey building. Different sections of the museum include: the BenCab Gallery, Cordillera Gallery, Erotica Gallery, Philippine Contemporary Art Gallery, Sepia Gallery, Maestro Gallery, Print Gallery, Patio Salvador, and Larawan Hall.

The museum complex also has the BenCab Farm & Garden, a leisure area featuring the Ecotrail – which showcases Igorot huts which are an example of Ifugao, Kalinga and Bontoc architecture. Its farm is used to cultivate coffee and other crops and the garden has bonsai trees. The area also has a restaurant-cafe known as the Café Sabel.

== See also ==
- List of single-artist museums
