= Gelacio Guillermo =

Filipino poet and critic (1940–2019)

Gelacio Y. Guillermo Jr.
- Born: March 10, 1940; Tarlac, Philippines
- Died: September 6, 2019 (aged 79); Quezon City, Philippines
- Occupations: Poet, revolutionary
- Spouse: Alice Guillermo
- Writing career
- Pen name: Kris Montañez
- Language: Filipino, English

Gelacio Y. Guillermo Jr. (10 March 1940 – 6 September 2019) was a Filipino poet, critic, translator, essayist, and revolutionary.

== Life and Works ==
Guillermo was born in Hacienda Luisita, San Miguel, Tarlac on March 10, 1940. He graduated from the University of the Philippines Diliman with an AB English degree in 1964 and taught at the same institution until the imposition of Martial Law in 1972. He also wrote using the nomme de guerre Kris Montañez. In a tribute to Guillermo, Jose Maria Sison accorded him, "the highest appreciation for his commitment to the revolutionary cause of the people, the quality of his literary works and the entire range of his cultural work, which includes collecting, selecting and publishing the works of other creative writers." He is considered by many Filipino critics to be "one of our best poets in English." According to Luis V. Teodoro his "socially committed poetry are among the most beautiful one can find in Philippine poetry."

His poetry has seen print in several prestigious literary magazines, journals, and anthologies. He published three poetry collections Seventeen Selected Poems (1968), Azucarera: Mga Tula sa Pilipino at Ingles (1994), and Mga Tula (Poems) (2014). He also translated Jose Maria Sison's prison poems into Filipino as, Sa Loob at Labas ng Piitan (2004). Under the nomme de guerre Kris Montañez, he published the short story collection, Kabanbanuagan: Mga Kwento ng Sonang Gerilya (1987) and the collection of essays, The New Mass Art and Literature and Other Related Essays (1974-1987) (1988). Some of the critical essays penned under his own name were included in the collection, Ang Panitikan ng Pambansang Demokrasya (The Literature of National Democracy) (1990). His anthology of revolutionary literature was published by the University of the Philippines Press under the title, Muog: Ang Naratibo ng Kanayunan sa Matagalang Digmang Bayan sa Pilipinas (1998). His critical work has influenced writers such as Elmer Ordoñez and Edel Garcellano.

Some of the writing fellowships he attended were the 1967 Summer Institute of Philippine Literature at the Ateneo de Manila University and the International Writing Program of Iowa University from 1969 to 1970. He was the National Fellow for the Essay of the UP Creative Writing Center (1989-1990). He read his poetry in Iowa, Wisconsin (1970), in Hyogo-ken, Japan (1995), and at the 27th Poetry International Festival at de Doelen, Rotterdam, and in Utrecht, Netherlands, 1996.

He was married to the renowned art critic Alice Guillermo and had two children, Sofia Guillermo and Ramon Guillermo.

== Awards and honors ==
His contributions were recognized by awards such as the Gawad Inangbayan (Polytechnic University of the Philippines, 1991), Gawad Marcelo H. del Pilar (College Editors Guild of the Philippines, 2007), Gawad Makata ng Bayan (Kilometer 64, 2009), and the Distinguished Achievement Award (UP Department of English and Comparative Literature Centennial, 2011).

== Selected published works ==
- Mga Tula (Quezon City: UP Press, 2014).
- Kung kami'y magkakapit-bisig: Mga Tula sa Hacienda Luisita (Edisyong Makabayan, 2010).
- Sa Loob at Labas ng Piitan: Mga Tula ni Jose Ma. Sison (Quezon City: Amado V. Hernandez Resource Center, 2004).
- Muog: Ang Naratibo ng Kanayunan sa Matagalang Digmang Bayan sa Pilipinas (Quezon City: UP Press, 1998).
- Azucarera: Mga Tula sa Pilipino at Ingles (Quezon City: Publikasyong Sipat, 1994).
- Ang Panitikan ng Pambansang Demokrasya (The Literature of National Democracy) (Manila: Kalikasan Press, 1990).
- The New Mass Art and Literature and Other Related Essays (1974-1987) (Quezon City: Kalikasan Press, 1988). [under the nomme de guerre Kris Montañez]
- Kabanbanuagan: Mga Kwento ng Sonang Gerilya (Artista at Manunulat ng Sambayanan, 1987). [under the nomme de guerre Kris Montañez]
- "Pan de Sal," Poetry (July 1971), p. 208.
- Seventeen Selected Poems (Quezon City: Tamaraw Pub., 1968).
