= Alice Guillermo =

Filipino Art Historian, Critic, and Academic

Alice G. Guillermo
- Born: January 6, 1938; Manila, Philippines
- Died: July 29, 2018 (aged 80); Quezon City, Philippines
- Occupations: Art critic and historian, progressive scholar
- Spouse: Gelacio Y. Guillermo Jr.
- Writing career
- Language: Filipino, English, French

Alice G. Guillermo (6 January 1938 – 29 July 2018) was a Filipino art historian, critic, academic, and author.

== Life and works ==
Guillermo was born in Manila on January 6, 1938. She received a BA in Education degree (magna cum laude) in 1957 from the College of Holy Ghost. As a scholar of the French government in art history and literature at the University of Aix-Marseille in Aix-en-Provence, she completed the Certificat d’Études Littéraires Générales, the Certificat de Séminaire d’Études Supérieures (“avec la mention assez bien”) with a study of the French nouveau roman, “La Modification par Michel Butor: Thèmes et Structures”, and the Diplôme de Langue et Lettres Françaises, also with Honours, in 1967. She received her PhD in Philippine Studies from the University of the Philippines Diliman.

She is best known for her extensive body of art criticism and academic texts on the subject of Philippine art, which academics credit for having significantly informed the writing of both art history and art theory in Southeast Asia.

A board member of the Concerned Artists of the Philippines and a member of the Cultural Research Association of the Philippines, she taught at and chaired the Art Studies department of the College of Arts and Literature at the University of the Philippines Diliman. Among her most influential books are Social Realism in the Philippines (1987), Images of Change (1988), The Covert Presence and Other Essays on Politics and Culture (1989), Protest/Revolutionary Art in the Philippines, 1970–1990 (2001), and Image to Meaning: Essays on Philippine Art (2001). In a tribute to her, Jose Maria Sison wrote, "She and her works will live on both as significant contributions to the cumulative revolutionary tradition of art and literature and as inspirational guide to the revolutionary artists and creative writers of this and further generations."

In 2020, the Philippine Contemporary Art Network published Frisson: The Collected Criticism of Alice Guillermo, a posthumous anthology of Guillermo's critical essays. The Cultural Center of the Philippines (CCP), recognized her contributions by granting her its highest award posthumously, the Gawad CCP Para sa Sining in 2020.

She was married to the revolutionary poet and critic Gelacio Guillermo and had two children, Sofia Guillermo and Ramon Guillermo.

== Selected published works ==
- Frisson: The Collected Criticism of Alice Guillermo (Philippine Contemporary Art Network, 2019).
- "Marxism and Ideological Strategies," In: Tadem, Teresa S. Encarnacion and Laura L. Samson, Marxism in the Philippines: Continuing Engagements (Manila: Anvil Press, 2010).
- Image to Meaning: Essays on Philippine Art (Quezon City: Ateneo de Manila University Press, 2001).
- Protest/Revolutionary Art in the Philippines, 1970-1990 (Quezon City: UP Press, 2001).
- "Mao Zedong's Revolutionary Aesthetics and its Influence on the Philippine Struggle," In: Jose Maria Sison & Stefan Engels (eds), Mao Zedong Thought Lives Essays in Commemoration of Mao’s Centennial (Utrecht: Verlag Neuer Weg, 1995),
- Sining Biswal: An Essay on the American Colonial and Contemporary Traditions in Philippine Visual Arts (Manila: Sentrong Pangkultura ng Pilipinas, 1994).
- Color in Philippine Life and Art (Manila: Sentrong Pangkultura ng Pilipinas, 1992).
- Cebu: A Heritage of Art (Felipe Y. Liao, 1991).
- Iskultura sa Pilipinas: Mula Anito hanggang Assemblage at iba pang Sanaysay (Manila: Metropolitan Museum of Manila, 1991).
- The Covert Presence and Other Essays on Politics and Culture (Manila: Kalikasan Press, 1989).
- Images of Change, Essays and Reviews (Quezon City: Kalikasan Press, 1988).
- Social Realism in the Philippines (Manila: ASPHODEL, 1987).
- Art Perception and Appreciation (Manila: University of the East, 1976).

== See also ==
- Protest art against the Marcos dictatorship
- Yan'an Forum
- Patrick D. Flores
