= Katarungang Pambarangay =

Local justice system in the Philippines

Katarungang Pambarangay, or the Barangay Justice System is a local justice system in the Philippines. It is operated by the smallest of the local government units, the barangay, and is overseen by the barangay captain, the highest elected official of the barangay and its executive. The barangay captain sits on the Lupon Tagapamayapa along with other barangay residents, which is the committee that decides disputes and other matters. They do not constitute a court as they do not have judicial powers.

The system exists to help decongest the regular courts and works mostly as "alternative, community-based mechanism for dispute resolution of conflicts," also described as a "compulsory mediation process at the village level."

Throughout the Philippines the Barangay Justice Systems handles thousands of cases a year. Since officials have more flexibility in decision-making, including from complex evidence rules, and receive some resources from government, the courts are more numerous and accessible than other courts and therefore the courts are able to hear more cases and to respond more immediately.

The Katarungang Pambarangay share characteristics with similar traditional, hybrid courts in other countries such as the Solomon Islands, Papua New Guinea, Nigeria and South Africa, among others. Such courts emerged during colonial periods as Western imperial powers introduced western legal systems. The Western legal systems were usually applied to westerners while the local dispute resolution systems were integrated into the Western system in a variety of ways including incorporation of local decision makers into the government in some way. After independence, many states faced the same problems as their former rulers, especially "limited geographical reach of state institutions, Western-modeled institutions often divorced from community structures and expectations, and resource constraints in the justice sector." Hybrid courts became a "middle ground for supporting community decision-making while simultaneously expanding the authority and reach of the state."

Besides "hybrid courts", other authors have described the system as a "Non-State Justice System".

== History ==
There has long been a traditional, local system of resolving disputes. Presidential Decree No. 1508 signed by President Ferdinand Marcos on June 11, 1978, talks an unofficial "time-honored tradition of amicably settling disputes among family and barangay members at the barangay level without judicial resources".

Alfredo Flores Tadiar was the principal author of Presidential Decree 1508, The Katarungang Pambarangay Law, and he also wrote its implementing rules, requiring prior conciliation as a condition for judicial recourse. For 12 years (1980–1992), he was a member of the Committee of Consultants, Bureau of Local Government Supervision, which oversaw the nationwide operations of the Katarungang Pambarangay Law. Under the decree, the body was known as Lupong Tagapayapa .

This decree was replaced by the Local Government Code of 1991.

== Operation, rules, and procedures ==
The Lupon Tagapamayapa is the body that comprises the barangay justice system and on it sit the barangay captain and 10 to 20 members. The body is normally constituted every three years and holds office until a new body is constituted in the third year. They receive no compensation except honoraria, allowances, and other emoluments as authorized by law or barangay, municipal or city ordinance.

Almost all civil disputes and many crimes with potential prison sentences of one year or less or fines of 5,000 Philippine pesos or less are subjected to the system. In barangays where a majority of members belong to an indigenous people of the Philippines, traditional dispute mechanisms such as a council of elders may replace the barangay judicial system.

Upon receipt of the complaint, the chairman of the committee, most often the barangay captain, shall the next working day inform the parties of a meeting for mediation. If, after 15 days for the first meeting, the mediation is not successful, then a more formal process involving the pangkat or body must be followed. There is another 15-day period to resolve the dispute through this more formal process, extendable by the pangkat for yet another 15 days. If no settlement has been reached, then a case can be filed in the regular judicial system of the Philippines.

== See also ==
- Local Government Code
- Local government in the Philippines
