= Contracting Colonialism =

1988 non-fiction book by Vicente L. Rafael

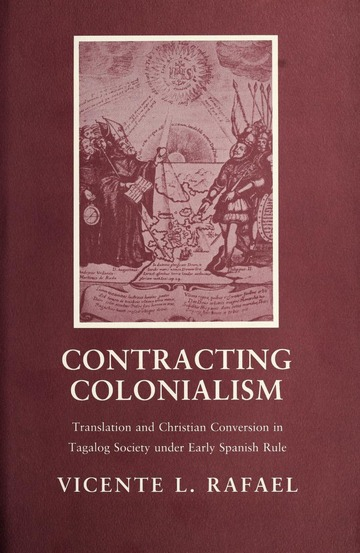
- Author: Vicente L. Rafael
- Language: English
- Genre: History
- Publisher: Cornell University Press
- Publication date: 1988
- Publication place: United States
- Pages: 230
- ISBN: 0-8014-2065-2

Contracting Colonialism: Translation and Christian Conversion in Tagalog Society under Early Spanish Rule is a 1988 non-fiction book by the Filipino-American author and historian Vicente L. Rafael. Originally his PhD thesis at Cornell University under the title Contracting Christianity, it was first published by Cornell University Press in hardcover, though most of its success came from paperback editions from the Duke and Ateneo presses. It was well received and widely cited, staying in print for at least 35 years after its initial release.

== Contents ==
Contracting Colonialism covers the history of Tagalog society in the Philippines from the late 16th century to the early 18th century, as they were colonized and christianized by Spanish forces. In the preface, Rafael opens by saying that "[t]he Spanish words conquista (conquest), conversión (conversion), and traducción (translation) are semantically related", and explains that he is analyzing Tagalog colonial society through conversion and translation. He also criticized the work of some previous scholarship that focused exclusively on the "Christianization" and "Hispanization" of natives for overemphasizing the importance of Spanish viewpoints while ignoring how the Tagalog language speakers were able to resist or selectively pick up on aspects of the Spanish dominion that were helpful to them. The "contracting" in the title is ambiguous and can refer to either a legally binding contract, such as the policies that govern interactions between governments and individuals, or the act of catching a disease.

Rafael explains that Christian missionaries often used native terms in order to explain the principles of Christianity. This allowed the native Tagalog values such as hiya (shame) and utang na loob (debt of gratitude), understood to be a system of debt and reciprocity, to be mapped onto Christian ideals of confession and servitude to God. Conversion could be seen as an appealing way to avoid these debts, as they would be subservient below God instead. Conversely, the use of "untranslatable" religious terms by the Spanish allowed the Tagalogs to create their own interpretations of Catholicism, aside from missionaries' intentions.

The book makes use of primary source documents such as grammars and dictionaries of Tagalog that had been created by Spanish missionaries, as well as Tagalog sources such as poetry, confession manuals, and prayers to the dying, which had not been widely analyzed beforehand. Rafael uses these sources to explain how Spanish concepts of religion and control were established in a way that was useful for colonial rule. Rafael argues that submission to Spanish authority and culture could have been seen as attractive to commoners; it ended the cycle of debt and reciprocity in favor of an attractive vision of death, where those who died could end up in paradise.

== Background ==
Contracting Colonialism began as Rafael's 1984 PhD thesis at Cornell University, Contracting Christianity: Conversions and Translations in Early Tagalog Colonial Society, which had won an "outstanding dissertation prize" from his university's Southeast Asia Prize. The Contracting Christianity title was inspired by Rafael reading a paper written by one of his housemates, largely graduate students in English, for a seminar on Sigmund Freud's work studying hysteria that was entitled "Contracting Disease". Rafael imagined the conversion process as "infecting them with different notions about life and death".

The title was changed from Contracting Christianity to Contracting Colonialism for the book release to avoid being categorized as "religious studies", which Rafael considered to be less attractive than "postcolonial studies". Rafael was advised to submit to Cornell University Press for publication, despite the perceived low odds of success, since very few similar works on Philippine history had been published by American university presses up until then. He also did not initially attempt to get it published in the Philippines, as it could cause problems obtaining tenure at his new employer, the University of Hawaiʻi at Mānoa. The manuscript was well received by Cornell University Press's reviewers and was officially accepted for publishing in December 1986. The completed work was published in 1988 under the title of Contracting Colonialism: Translation and Christian Conversion in Tagalog Society under Early Spanish Rule. The book was heavily marketed, being included in Cornell University Press's catalogs for Asian studies and history, anthropology, and literary criticism; review copies were sent to more than 40 journals, and its marketing budget was "far exceeded".

== Reception ==
Full art from Gaspar de San Agustin's Conquistas de las Islas Philipinas

Contracting Colonialism received generally positive reviews. Rafael's writing style and effectiveness at communication were praised, as well as his generally novel interpretation of primary sources. Its general breadth of covering Philippine culture and history, and its clarity in doing so, were well received. Although still viewing the book positively overall, several critics in journals noted a few general errors in facts, including dates, interpretations, and Tagalog etymology and spelling. One critic, John N. Schumacher, gave Contracting Colonialism an entirely negative review, viewing Rafael's hypotheses as overcomplicated and lacking concrete evidence. He further criticized Rafael for what he saw as a lack of background in European history that led to him misinterpreting evidence, especially with respect to confessionals, as well as mixing evidence from different time periods in a way that showed an "ahistorical character".

The book won the Philippines' National Book Awards for history in 1988.

== Legacy ==
After receiving early negative reviews, including from Schumacher, described as a "mentor whose views [Rafael] greatly admired", Rafael was worried that he might "have no future in the field", and that Contracting Colonialism would not be successful in the long term. Despite these fears, it was still in print 35 years after it was first published. It is generally considered to be one of the most successful works of history by a Filipino author.

Although the book was first published through Cornell, they only ever did one 1,000-copy printing. The paperback version from Ateneo University Press had already gone through several reprintings by 1992, which continued in 1,000 and 500-copy printings into the 2010s. It was likely particularly popular for its subject matter in the Philippines, where the competition for new history books was limited to only two or three university press titles instead of hundreds. Duke University Press, who published a paperback in the United States, also had a larger success, with at least three reprintings as of 2012.

A 2013 analysis of citations of Southeast Asian studies argued that, although Contracting Colonialism was influential within its own field, it was even more influential on scholars in other fields.
