= Benedicto Cabrera =

Filipino painter (born 1942)

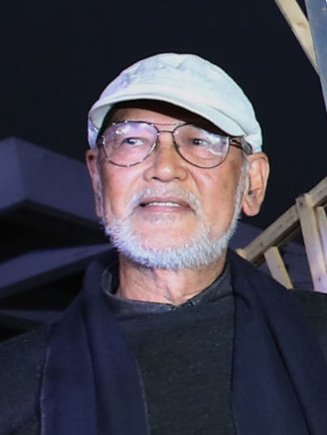
- Cabrera in 2018
- Born: Benedicto Reyes Cabrera; April 10, 1942 (age 83); Malabon, Rizal, Commonwealth of the Philippines
- Education: University of the Philippines Diliman
- Known for: Painting
- Children: 3
- Awards: Order of National Artists of the Philippines

Benedicto Reyes Cabrera (born April 10, 1942), better known as "BenCab", is a Filipino painter who was conferred a National Artist of the Philippines for Visual Arts (Painting) in 2006. He has been noted as "arguably the best-selling painter of his generation of Filipino artists."

== Early life and education ==
BenCab was born to Democrito Cabrera and Isabel Reyes in Malabon, Philippines on April 10, 1942. He was the youngest of nine children. BenCab's first exposure and discovery of the arts happened through his elder brother, Salvador, who was already an established artist during Bencab's childhood.

He went on to study at the University of the Philippines Diliman. He received his bachelor's degree in Fine Arts in 1963.

== Family and European career ==
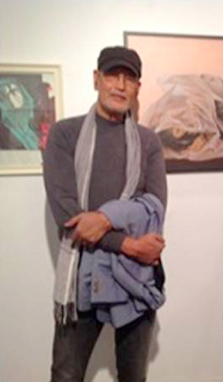
Cabrera in New York. c. 2013.

BenCab met British journalist Caroline Kennedy (author of An Affair of State, 1987, and How the English Establishment Framed Stephen Ward, 2013) in Manila in 1968, and married her in London in 1969. The couple decided to stay in London. They have three children. The eldest, Elisar (b. 1971; d. 2020), a film and web series producer, was married to award-winning playwright and web series writer, Lisa Gifford. Their middle child, Mayumi, was born in Manila in 1973 and became a successful model both in London and Los Angeles. She currently lives in Los Angeles with her partner, John A. Fries, and their two children, Ronan (2011) and Ione (2013). Their youngest, Jasmine was born in 1977, the mother of Sienna Daphne (b. 2016), and lives in Quezon City.

When BenCab returned to the Philippines in 1972, he was hailed as a Filipino pioneer of the arts and a significant influence among his peers. However, he returned to London once more in 1974, partly to get away from the tightening grip of Martial Law, which Ferdinand Marcos had declared in 1972. That event is said to have "marked the beginning of [BenCab]'s passionate involvement with social commentary and the topics of repression and freedom," turning him into a key figure in the development of protest art against the Marcos dictatorship.

His Larawan series was developed out of his nostalgia for the Philippines. He and Caroline used to scour local flea markets all over Europe looking for early maps and prints of the Philippines. This collection became the basis for his Larawan series.

In 1985, however, BenCab's 16-year marriage with Kennedy ended in divorce, and he eventually decided to come home to the Philippines.

== The Baguio years ==
BenCab eventually returned to the Philippines, and settled in the City of Baguio in Northern Luzon, eventually putting up a studio and a secluded little farm on Asin road, in the nearby town of Tuba, Benguet. He and a small group of fellow artists - visual artist Santiago Bose, filmmaker Kidlat Tahimik, and sculptor Ben Hur Villanueva, among others, established the Baguio Arts Guild (BAG). It was during this period in his career that BenCab began to more deeply explore the use handmade paper as a medium on which to work.

When the 1990 Luzon earthquake struck, BenCab and the BAG helped out by instituting programs such as the ArtAid workshop for traumatized children, and a fund-raising art auction they titled "Artquake." Bencab was elected president of the guild the following year.

Later in the 1990s, BenCab's input was a critical element in the creation of Tam-awan Village, "a refuge for local artists who desire a nurturing environment in which to develop their talents, and a community for all those who wish to take part in the harmonious fusion of art, culture, environment, and history."

BenCab also exhibited considerably during the last decade of the Millennium, also reaping many accolades. Among the most prominent of the many awards received by BenCab during this period was the Gawad CCP Para sa Sining (Cultural Center of the Philippines Award for the Arts) in 1992.

== National Artist and recent awards ==
In 2006, the Philippine Government conferred upon him the Order of National Artist for Visual Arts. In 2009, the University of the Philippines conferred upon him an honorary Doctor of Humanities degree. He was also conferred Doctor of Humanities, honoris causa by the University of the Cordilleras in 2018. His other notable recognitions and awards are enumerated below:

1962

- Second Prize, Painting, Shell National Student Art Competition

1963

- First Prize, Painting, University of the Philippines Student Council Art Competition

1967

- First Prize, Photography, 20th Art Association of the Philippines (AAP) Annual Exhibition & Competition
- Second Prize, Photography, 20th AAP Annual Exhibition & Competition
- Third Honorable Mention, Photography, 20th AAP Annual Exhibition & Competition

1969

- Philippine Representative, VI Paris Biennale

1970

- Thirteen Artists Award, Cultural Center of the Philippines

1988

- Kalinangan (Cultural) Award For Painting, City of Manila

1991

- President, Baguio Arts Guild

1992

- Gawad CCP Para Sa Sining (CCP Awards For The Arts) for Visual Arts, Cultural Center of the Philippines

1993

- Chairman, 4th Baguio Arts Festival

1994

- Most Outstanding Kapampangan For Arts & Culture (Painting) Award, given by President Ramos on Pampanga Day

1997

- ASEAN Achievement Award, for Visual & Performing Arts, 5th ASEAN Achievement Awards, ASEAN Business Forum, Jakarta
- Outstanding Citizen of Baguio Award for Arts, given by the mayor of Baguio on the city’s 88th Foundation Day

2005

- Invited by the Singapore Tyler Print Institute to join their Visiting Artists Programme as artist-in residence for one month working on large-scale prints & paperpulp painting.

2006

- Conferred the Order of National Artist for Visual Arts by President Gloria Macapagal-Arroyo in Malacanan Palace.

2011

- Holy Angel University Juan D. Nepomuceno Cultural Award for Outstanding Achievement in the Arts

== Bibliography ==
Books and Other Publications

- Ben Cabrera: Etchings (1970–1980) by Cid Reyes (1980)
- Bencab’s Rock Sessions by Eric Caruncho (1995)
- Bencab by Alfred Yuson and Cid Reyes (2002)
- BenCab: Nude Drawings by Alfred Yuson (2008)
- BenCab Portraits by Ambeth R. Ocampo (2015)
- My BenCab: Collectors Tell Their Stories (2018) (edited by Thelma Sioson San Juan)

== See also ==
- BenCab Museum
