= Santi Bose =

Santiago Bose
- Born: 25 July 1949; Baguio, Philippines
- Died: 3 December 2002 (aged 53); Baguio, Philippines
- Education: University of the Philippines Diliman College of Fine Arts

Santiago Bose (July 25, 1949 – December 3, 2002), also known as Santi Bose, was a mixed-media artist and community organizer from the Philippines who co-founded the Baguio Arts Guild. He is recognized by the Cultural Center of the Philippines as a pioneer in the use of indigenous materials.

== Early life and education ==
Santiago Bobila Bose was born to Mariano Bose and Lourdes Bobila on July 25, 1949, in Baguio in the Cordillera Region of the Philippines. He attended the Mapua Institute of Technology from 1965 to 1967 for architecture, then transferred and graduated from the College of Fine Arts at the University of the Philippines Diliman in 1972. Bose furthered his art studies in the United States at the West 17th Print Workshop in New York City while in a self-imposed exile. He returned to his hometown of Baguio in 1986 after the People Power Revolution.

In 1994, he was a visiting research fellow at the Southern Cross University in Lismore, Australia, and, in 2000, a visiting artist in residence at the Pacific Bridge Gallery in Oakland, California.

== Career ==
Throughout his career, Bose featured in major international events, including the Havana Biennial in 1989, the Third Asian Art Show in Fukuoka, Japan, also in 1989, and the First Asia-Pacific Triennial of Contemporary Art at the Queensland Art Gallery in Brisbane, Australia in 1993. His work was also featured in the 1996 exhibit Memories of Overdevelopment at the University of California, Irvine, and the 2000 exhibit At Home and Abroad: 20 Contemporary Filipino Artists at the Asian Art Museum of San Francisco.

=== Baguio Arts Guild ===
In 1987, Bose founded, and was an original board member of, the Baguio Arts Guild, along with Benedicto Cabrera, Kidlat Tahimik, Roberto Villanueva, David Barbadas, and Irineo Geslani. He served as its chairperson in 1992 and the again in 2002. The Baguio Arts Guild is an art association based in the Cordillera Region that emphasizes the use of indigenous materials and multimedia, with themes that focus on nature, the environment, and Filipino identity.

== Personal life ==
Bose met his future wife, Peggy, at the University of the Philippines Diliman. They married in 1994 and had three daughters: Diwata, Lilledeshan, and Mutya. The couple separated, Peggy recalling, "I felt that his being an artist got in the way of his being a family man, with three kids. It was not what we promised each other when we got married. And it was making both of us unhappy."

== Recognitions ==
In 1976, Bose was recognized as a Thirteen Artists awardee by the Cultural Center of the Philippines.
