= Alfredo Flores Tadiar =

Filipino attorney

Alfredo Flores Tadiar (15 June 1930 – 3 December 2015) was a Filipino attorney whose strong advocacy for and commitment to the alternative dispute resolution (ADR) movement has led to his recognition by Chief Justice Hilario Davide, Jr. as the "father of ADR in the Philippines". He was Chairman of the National Amnesty Commission of the Philippines from 1996 to 2003, and was the pioneering Chair of the Government Panel to negotiate peace with military rebels who sought to topple the government of Corazon Aquino in various coup attempts.

== Education and early career ==
Tadiar took three degrees from Silliman University, Dumaguete, A.A. (with High Distinction), A.B. (cum laude) and LL.B (cum laude). He began his law degree at the University of the Philippines but completed it at Silliman. He placed 14th in the 1955 Bar Examination, where he obtained a rating of 85.25%.

He was appointed as trial judge at the first level court of San Juan, La Union (1959–1968) and later promoted to the Provincial Capital Court of San Fernando, La Union (1968–1976). In 1970 he won a fellowship from the United Church Board for World Ministries to study US juvenile criminal justice at Boston University. He later applied to take his Masters of Law at Harvard and was immediately accepted. His master's thesis entitled "The Administration of Criminal Justice in the Philippines: Some Aspects for a Comparative Study with that of the United States" was given a special commendation by Harvard Law School Dean James Vorenberg and was later published in the Philippine Law Journal.

In 1976, after having read his master's thesis, Dean Irene Cortes of the University of the Philippines College of Law invited Tadiar to join the faculty. He accepted. While teaching undergraduate courses on remedial law subjects as well as master level courses on the administration of criminal justice and population law, he was also Director of the Office of Legal Aid, a law internship program which provides free legal assistance to the underprivileged. He was the principal proponent of the Petition to the Supreme Court to amend the Rules of Court to allow Supervised Law Student Practice Rule, which became Rule 138-A in 1986. He retired from teaching in 1996.

== Katarungang Pambarangay ==
In 1979, Tadiar's "preachings" for an ADRM was formally adopted as an adjunct to the legal system when PD 1508, The Katarungang Pambarangay Law, was promulgated. He was a principal author of that law, together with its implementing rules, requiring prior conciliation as a condition for judicial recourse. For 12 years (1980–1992), he was a member of the Committee of Consultants, Bureau of Local Government Supervision, which oversaw the nationwide operations of the Katarungang Pambarangay Law.

He subsequently tested the empirical bases of the legal assumptions underlying that law in a socio-legal research study funded by Asia Foundation (1984) that he conducted in a rural area (San Fernando, La Union) and an urban area (Quezon City). A significant finding of his study was that Filipino people placed a high value on the legal recognition of their customary mode of settling their interpersonal disputes for its own intrinsic worth, while the instrumental value of decongesting court dockets is only of secondary importance.

== Advocacy for ADR ==
From 1991-1993, Tadiar undertook another empirical study (again funded by the Asia Foundation) approved by the Supreme Court for the diversion of pending court cases to mediation. The result of his study entitled "Court-Referred Mediation" bore legal fruit in 1999 by an official pilot project for such diversion in the cities of Valenzuela and Mandaluyong. The Philippine Judicial Academy, which oversaw the experiment, appointed him as a consultant in the conceptualization of the project and in the training of mediators. The project was later expanded to all of Metro Manila and then to the cities of Cebu and Davao. Subsequently, the court-referred mediation that he pioneered in for trial courts, has been expanded to include the Court of Appeals and most recently, the Supreme Court. This would eventually lead to a formal amendment of the Rules of Court for a nationwide adoption empowering judges to divert pending cases for mediation and eventually, arbitration.

Tadiar's bent for law reform, particularly in the judiciary, resulted in his appointment by the Supreme Court as member of the Design and Management Committee of the ADR Model Courts for the two pilot projects (Justice Reforms Initiatives Support Project funded by the Canadian International Development Agency) in San Fernando, Pampanga and Bacolod, Negros Occidental. In 2003, he and the Committee completed a study tour in Toronto to look into their system of mandatory mediation in the courts. He later became a member of the Supreme Court appointed Sub-Committee on Special Rules of Court on ADR.

In 2004, he became the first Chairman of the ADR Department of the Philippine Judicial Academy. He engaged in the curriculum revision and re-design of its mediation training programs. He directed the Court of Appeals Mediation Project by training its faculty and mediators, and supervising their internship as a condition to their accreditation by the Supreme Court. He was himself accredited by the Supreme Court as a mediator for the Court of Appeals.

== The peace process ==
In 1993, Tadiar became a Commissioner of the National Amnesty Commission, tasked to draft proposals for amnesty to rebels of all kinds (military, communist and Muslim), formulate implementing rules and administer its operations. That same year, he was appointed Chair of the Government Panel to negotiate peace with military rebels who sought to topple the government of Corazon Aquino in various coup attempts. In 1996, he was appointed Chairman of the NAC, with rank of Cabinet Secretary, a post which he held for 7 years.

== Construction arbitration ==
He was among the earliest practitioners of arbitration in construction disputes and became one of the most experienced arbitrators, deciding over a hundred disputes at record speeds of resolution, not one of which has been reversed by an appellate court. He chaired the committee for the revision of the Construction Industry Arbitration Commission (CIAC) Rules Governing the Arbitration of Construction Disputes, approved and promulgated by CIAC effective December 2005.

== Advocacy for reproductive rights ==
Tadiar "undertook extensive research into the legal and constitutional provisions on reproductive rights and abortion. His work provided the legal basis for the promotion of women's reproductive rights, of which he was a firm advocate" In 1996, he was Director of a Ford Foundation-funded, 3-year project to set up and make operational a centre that "focused on questions of legal and medical ethics related to reproductive health". He served as the first Executive Director of the pioneering Center for Research, Studies and Training on Reproductive Health, Rights and Ethics (REPROCEN) as a joint project of the UP Colleges of Law and Medicine. He was designated as International Adviser to the board of trustees of the International Women's Health Coalition based in New York. From the 1980s, he served at various times, as Chairman or Member of the Board of Directors of two other Philippine NGOs—the Women's Health Care Foundation and Institute for Social Studies and Action.

== Lectures and writings ==
- "A Philosophy of a Penal Code" - Judge Guillermo Guevarra Chair on Criminal Law and Penal Science
- "Towards Maintaining a Desirable Balance Between Societal Security and Civil Liberties in the Administration of Justice" - Don Quintin Paredes Chair on Remedial Law
- "Quality of Justice Administered by the Criminal Justice System of a Provincial Capital Town" (1985)
- "Unclogging the Court Dockets" - paper commissioned under a World Bank-funded project (1991)
- "Shortfalls in the Institutional Administration of Justice" Vol. VII, No. 1, Criminal Justice Journal, Official Publication of the National Police Commission
- "Training in Judicial Management Education and Administration of Justice" Vol. V, No. 2
- "Some Roles/ Functions in the Administration of Criminal Justice" Vol. 55 No. 1, Philippine Law Journal, March 1980.
- "Critical analyses of Supreme Court decisions on criminal procedure from 1983 up to March 1990" (1990)
