= Leloy Claudio =

Filipino professor, academic, author, and political analyst

Lisandro Claudio
- Born: Lisandro Elias Estrada Claudio; September 23, 1984 (age 42); Manila, Philippines
- Occupations: professor, academic, author, political analyst
- Awards: Philippine National Book Award (2014)

Academic background
- Education: Ateneo de Manila University (AB); University of Melbourne (PhD)

Academic work
- Institutions: University of California, Berkeley; Ateneo de Manila University; De La Salle University
- Notable works: Liberalism and the Postcolony; Taming People's Power; Basagan ng Trip
- Website: sseas.berkeley.edu/people/lisandro-claudio

Lisandro Elias "Leloy" Estrada Claudio (born September 23, 1984) is a Filipino academic, author, and political commentator. He is currently an assistant professor of Southeast Asian Studies at the University of California, Berkeley, and is known for his works on Philippine history, politics, and society.

== Early life and education ==
Claudio was born in Manila to Dr Rafael Claudio and Sylvia Estrada Claudio. His uncle, Gabriel Claudio, served as a political adviser to former Philippine President Gloria Macapagal Arroyo. He completed his Bachelor of Arts in Communication at the Ateneo de Manila University in 2007, graduating as class valedictorian and magna cum laude. He later earned his Doctor of Philosophy in Asian History from the University of Melbourne in 2011.

== Career ==
Claudio has taught at several universities including Ateneo de Manila University, De La Salle University, and currently at the University of California, Berkeley where he specializes in Southeast Asian studies.

His notable works include:

- Taming People's Power: The EDSA Revolutions and Their Contradictions (2013)
- Liberalism and the Postcolony: Thinking the State in 20th-Century Philippines (2017)
- Basagan ng Trip: Complaints About Filipino Culture and Politics (2017)

Claudio regularly contributes political commentary to publications such as Rappler, Esquire Philippines, and New Mandala.

== Controversies and political views ==
=== Accusing Tito Sotto of plagiarism ===
In 2013 Claudio and writer Miguel Syjuco accused then-Senator Tito Sotto of plagiarizing Robert F. Kennedy's 1966 speech. They challenged Sotto to debate the RH Bill, which Sotto declined.

=== Views on historical figures ===
Claudio has argued that Ninoy Aquino collaborated with communist groups during the Marcos dictatorship. He also criticized the film Heneral Luna for romanticizing authoritarianism.

=== UC Berkeley controversy ===
In 2019 some groups protested Claudio's hiring at UC Berkeley, accusing him of "red-tagging". The university maintained its hiring decision.
