= Christian Espiritu =

Filipino fashion designer (1934–2023)

- Born: Christian de Leon Espiritu; January 4, 1934; Parañaque, Philippine Islands
- Died: June 18, 2023 (aged 89)
- Occupation(s): Fashion designer, couturier to Imelda Marcos
- Spouse: Gliceria Limcaoco
- Children: Talitha Espiritu

Christian de Leon Espiritu (January 4, 1934 – June 18, 2023) was a Filipino fashion designer and couturier.

== Early life ==
Christian Espiritu was born on January 4, 1934, to Eugenio Espiritu, a school principal, and Felicula Espiritu in Parañaque, Metro Manila.

Espiritu studied architecture at the University of Santo Tomas. He became a draftsman for Leandro Locsin before deciding to shift careers into fashion design.

== Career ==
Espiritu was considered an important figure in redefining the Filipiniana attire and Filipino fashion along with a generation of designers that included Pitoy Moreno, Ben Farrales, Aureo Alonzo, Gilbert Perez, Rudy Dandan, Arturo V. Cruz, Emil Valdez, Ernie Arandia, and Casimiro Abad from the 1960s onward.

Espiritu gained renown mainly as the chief couturier of Imelda Marcos, who wore his gowns to state visits in the United States, Cuba, China, and during the 2,500th anniversary of the Persian Empire in Persepolis in 1971. He ran an atelier and a couture shop in Leon Guinto Street and then in Adriatico Street in Malate until the late 1980s.

In the 1980s he ventured into costume design for movies, designing wardrobes for actors Hilda Koronel, Sharon Cuneta, and Jay Ilagan. He is credited as costume designer for Salawahan (1979, directed by Ishmael Bernal), Nagalit ang buwan sa haba ng gabi (1983), To Love Again (1983), Palabra de honor (1983), and Gaano kadalas ang minsan? (1982). He ventured into filmmaking with Alaga (1980) which he wrote and directed and starred Charito Solis and Edu Manzano.

Espiritu mentored Barge Ramos, Jojie Lloren, and Gang Gomez in his atelier. He said that he "hand-picked" the young Inno Sotto to be his apprentice after seeing him draw. Espiritu's long-time muse was Margarita "Tingting" de los Reyes-Cojuangco who was just in college when she started modeling for Espiritu. He would later make Tingting Cojuangco's wedding gown.

== Retirement ==
Espiritu had a falling out with Imelda Marcos in the late 1970s as the former first lady started to scout for "fresh talent." He eventually cut ties with her and participated in the 1986 EDSA People Power Revolution. After four decades in the fashion scene which included a six-year stint as a fashion designer in New York City, Espiritu closed shop and became a columnist for The Philippine Star.

In 2003, he appeared in the Imelda documentary on Imelda Marcos, stating that so many women "got blind" making embroideries for the former first lady's clothes which were often ordered on short notice.

Espiritu died on June 18, 2023, at the age of 89.

== See also ==
- List of fashion designers from the Philippines
