= Barangay =

Administrative division of the Philippines

- Also known as: Barrio
- Number of barangays per Philippine province
- Category: Village
- Location: Philippines
- Found in: Cities, municipalities, and barangay districts
- Created: September 21, 1974; 52 years ago (Note: By virtue of Presidential Decree No. 557, s. 1974.)
- Number: 42,010 (as of April 13, 2026)
- Populations: 1 (Buenavista and Salvacion) (Note: Excluding barangays whose populations declined to zero due to various reasons. As of 2026, there are 12 barangays with a population of zero: Alas-as (San Nicolas, Batangas); Bagong Lipunan (Baguio); Barangay 76 (Caloocan); Calawit (Balete, Batangas); Centro 15 (Aparri, Cagayan); Diaz (Porac, Pampanga); Fuentes (Banate, Iloilo); Kantagnos (Baybay, Leyte); Pilar (Abuyog, Leyte); Pula (General Mamerto Natividad, Nueva Ecija); Pulang-Bato (San Nicolas, Batangas); Uauang-Galicia (Santo Tomas, Isabela)) – 215,035 (Commonwealth)
- Areas: 0.14 ha (0.0014 km^{2}) for Malusak – 65,000 ha (650 km^{2}) for Gupitan
- Government: Sangguniang Barangay (barangay council)
- Subdivisions: Sitio (informal); Purok (informal)

The barangay (Note: Also spelled baranggay in Filipino.) (/bɑːr.ɑːŋ.ˈɡaɪ/; abbreviated as Brgy. or Bgy.), historically known as the barrio, (Note: Also spelled baryo and abbreviated as Bo.. The term is still sometimes used interchangeably.) is the smallest administrative division in the Philippines. Named after the precolonial polities of the same name, modern barangays are political subdivisions of cities and municipalities, and are analogous to villages, districts, neighborhoods, hamlets, suburbs, or boroughs. The term barangay is derived from balangay, a type of boat used by Austronesian peoples when they migrated to the Philippines.

All cities, including independent cities, and municipalities in the Philippines are politically subdivided into barangays, with the exception of the municipalities of Adams in Ilocos Norte and Kalayaan in Palawan, each of which contains only one barangay. Barangays are sometimes informally subdivided into smaller areas called purok (English: "zone"), or barangay zones consisting of clusters of houses for organizational purposes, and sitios, which are territorial enclaves—usually rural—located far from the poblacion. As of April 2026, there are 42,010 barangays throughout the country.

== History ==
When the first Spaniards arrived in the Philippines in the 16th century, they found well-organized, independent villages called barangays. The name barangay, also spelled balangay, originally referred to a certain type of traditional boat in many languages in the Philippines. Early Spanish dictionaries of Philippine languages make it clear that the precolonial balangay or barangay was pronounced "ba-la-ngay" or "ba-ra-ngay", while today the modern barangay is pronounced "ba-rang-gay", leading to the non-standard spelling baranggay. The pre-colonial term also referred to the people serving under a particular chief rather than to the modern meaning of an area of land, for which other words were used. While barangay is a Tagalog word, it spread throughout the Philippines as Spanish rule concentrated power in Manila.

All citations regarding pre-colonial barangays lead to a single source, Juan de Plascencia's 1589 report Las costumbres de los indios Tagalos de Filipinas. However, historian Damon Woods challenges the concept of a barangay as an indigenous political organization primarily due to a lack of linguistic evidence. Based on indigenous language documents, Tagalogs did not use the word barangay to describe themselves or their communities. Instead, barangay is argued to be a Spanish invention resulting from an attempt by the Spaniards to reconstruct pre-conquest Tagalog society.

The first barangays started as relatively small communities of around 50 to 100 families. By the time of contact with the Spaniards, many barangays had developed into large communities. The encomienda of 1604 shows that many affluent and powerful coastal barangays in Sulu, Butuan, Panay, Leyte, Cebu, Pampanga, Pangasinan, Pasig, Laguna, and the Cagayan River were flourishing trading centers. Some of these barangays had large populations. In Panay, some barangays had 20,000 inhabitants; in Leyte (Baybay), 15,000 inhabitants; in Cebu, 3,500 residents; in Vitis (Pampanga), 7,000 inhabitants; and in Pangasinan, 4,000 residents. There were smaller barangays with fewer people, but these were generally inland communities, or if they were coastal, they were not located in areas that were good for business pursuits. These smaller barangays had around thirty to one hundred houses only, and the population varied from 100 to 500 persons. According to Miguel López de Legazpi, he founded communities with only 20 to 30 people.

Traditionally, the original "barangays" were coastal settlements formed by the migration of these Malayo-Polynesian people (who came to the archipelago) from other places in Southeast Asia (see chiefdom). Most of the ancient barangays were coastal or riverine. This is because most of the people were relying on fishing for their supply of protein and their livelihood. They also traveled mostly by water, up and down rivers and along the coasts. Trails always followed river systems, which were also a major source of water for bathing, washing, and drinking.

The coastal barangays were more accessible to trade with foreigners. These were ideal places for economic activity to develop. Business with traders from other countries also meant contact with other cultures and civilizations, such as those of Japan, Han Chinese, Indians, and Arabs. These coastal communities acquired more cosmopolitan cultures with developed social structures (sovereign principalities), ruled by established royalties and nobilities.

During Spanish rule, through a resettlement policy called reductions, smaller, scattered barangays were consolidated (and thus "reduced") to form compact towns. Each barangay was headed by the cabeza de barangay (barangay chief), who formed part of the principalía, the elite ruling class of the municipalities of the Spanish Philippines. This position was inherited from the first datus and came to be known as such during the Spanish regime. The Spanish monarch, who also collected taxes (called tribute) from the residents for the Spanish Crown, ruled each barangay through the cabeza.

When the Americans arrived, "slight changes in the structure of local government was effected". Later, Rural Councils with four councilors were created to assist, now renamed Barrio Lieutenant; they were later renamed Barrio Council and then Barangay Council (Sangguniang Barangay).

The Spanish term barrio (abbr. Bo.) was used for much of the 20th century. Manila mayor Ramon Bagatsing established the first Barangay Bureau in the Philippines, creating the blueprint for the barangay system as the basic socio-political unit for the city in the early 1970s. This was quickly replicated by the national government, and in 1974, President Ferdinand Marcos ordered the renaming of barrios to barangays. The name survived the People Power Revolution, though older people would still use the term barrio. The Municipal Council was abolished upon the transfer of powers to the barangay system. Marcos used to call the barangay part of Philippine participatory democracy, and most of his writings involving the New Society praised the role of baranganic democracy in nation-building.

After the People Power Revolution and the drafting of the 1987 Constitution, the Municipal Council was restored, making the barangay the smallest unit of Philippine government. The first barangay elections held under the new constitution were held on March 28, 1989, under Republic Act No. 6679.

The last barangay elections were held in October 2023. The next elections will be held in November 2028.

== Organization ==
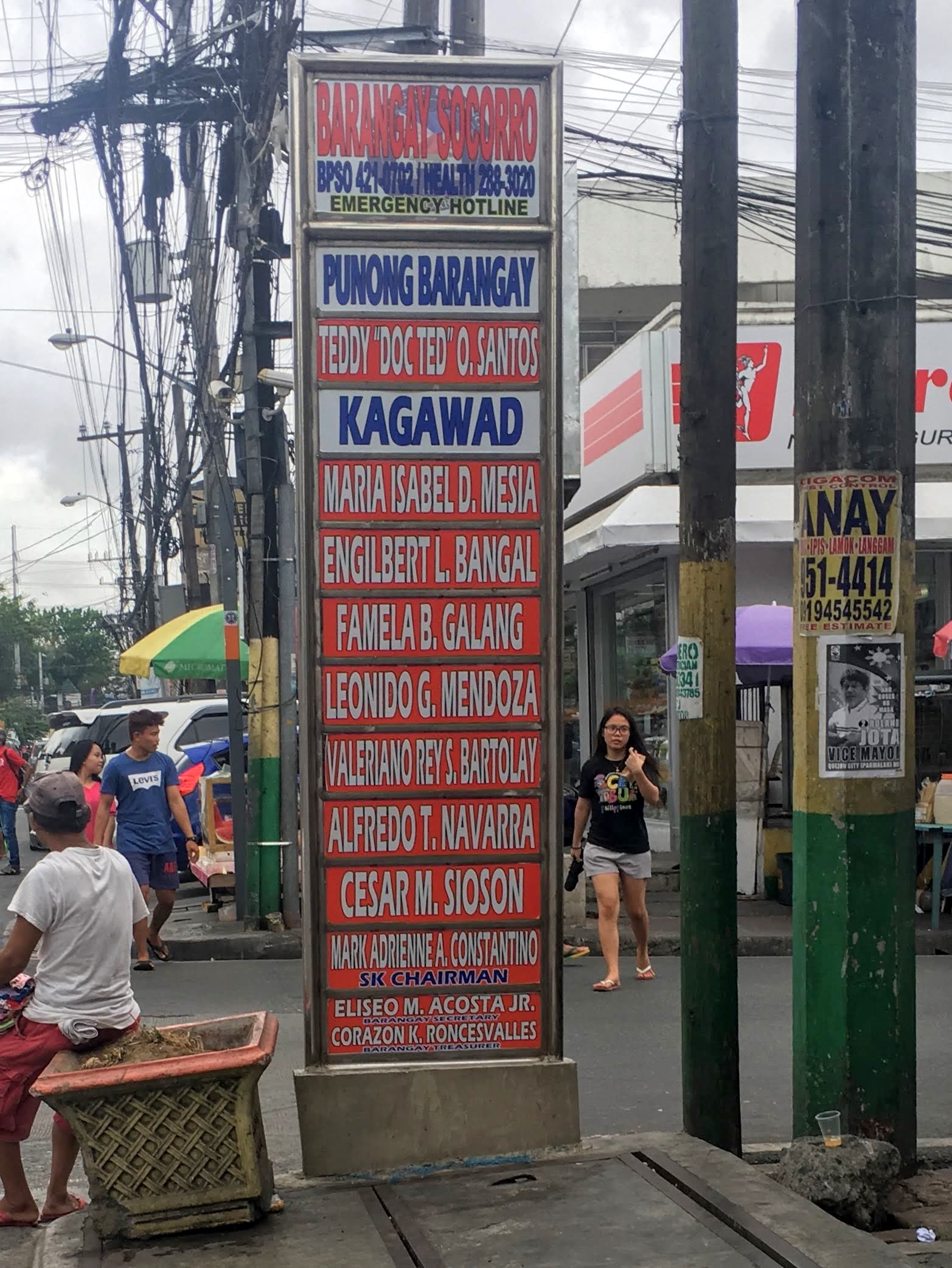
Information sign at the boundary of Barangay Socorro in Quezon City listing the barangay's officials

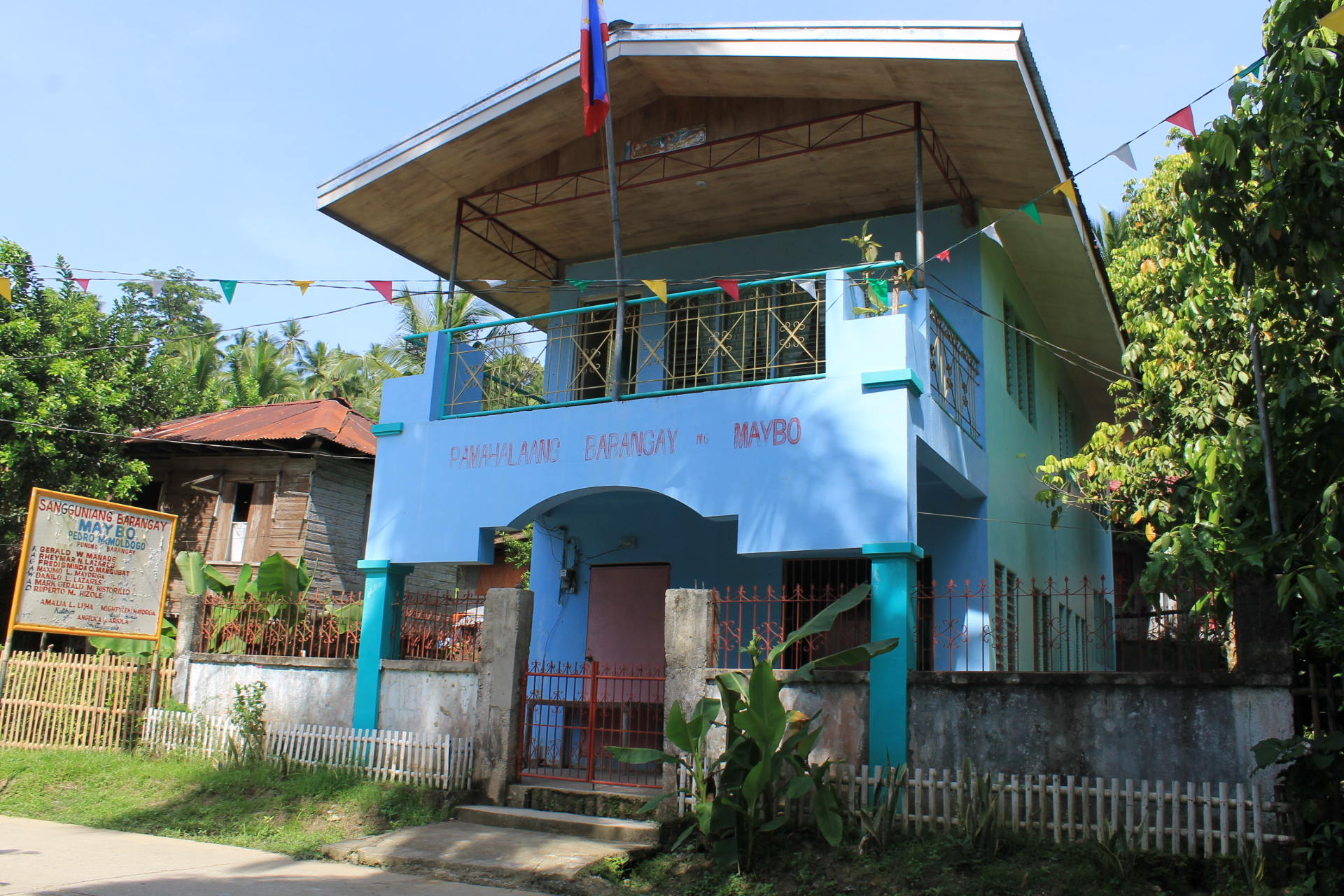
Maybo's barangay hall in Boac, Marinduque

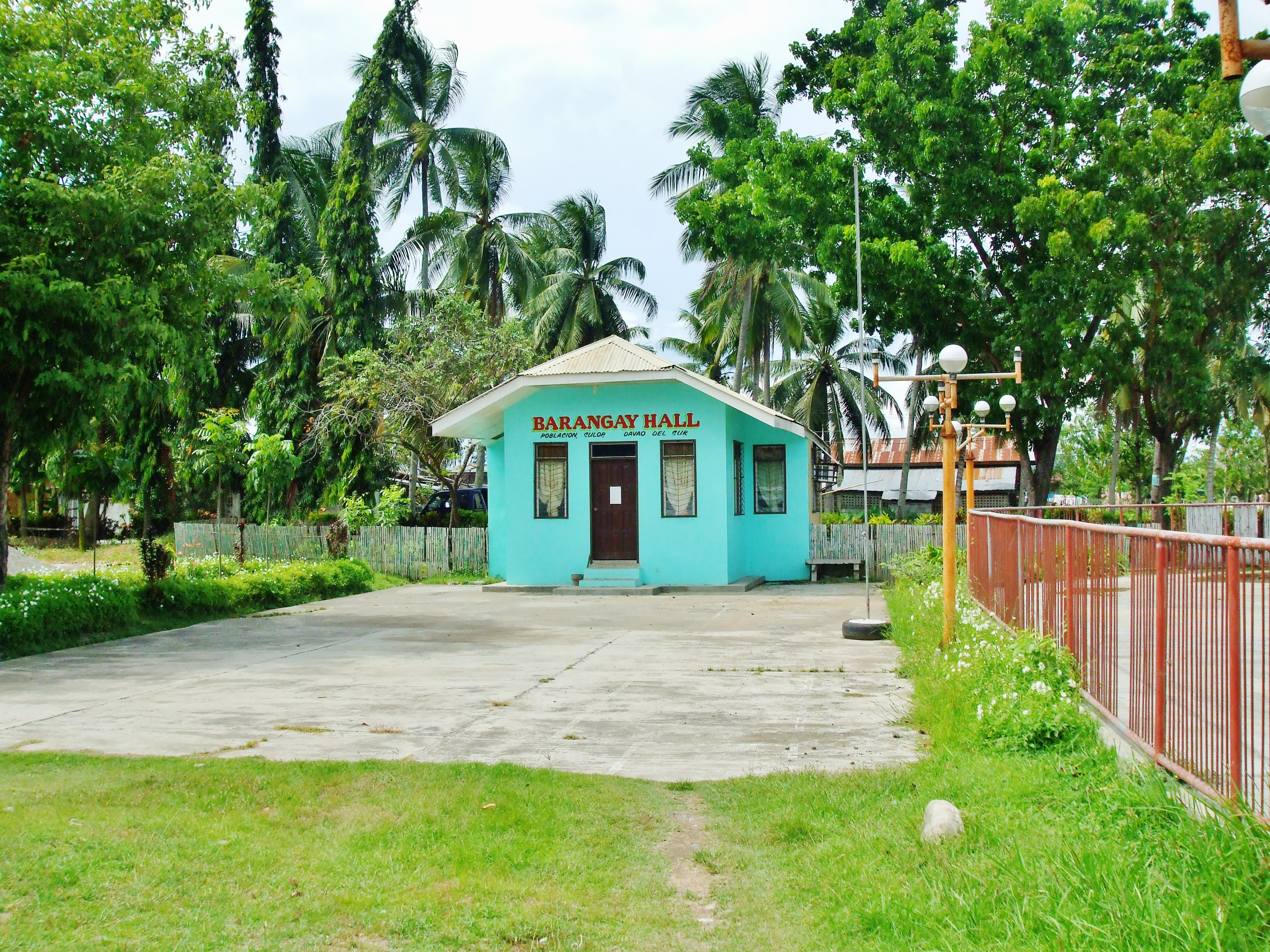
A barangay hall in Sulop, Davao del Sur

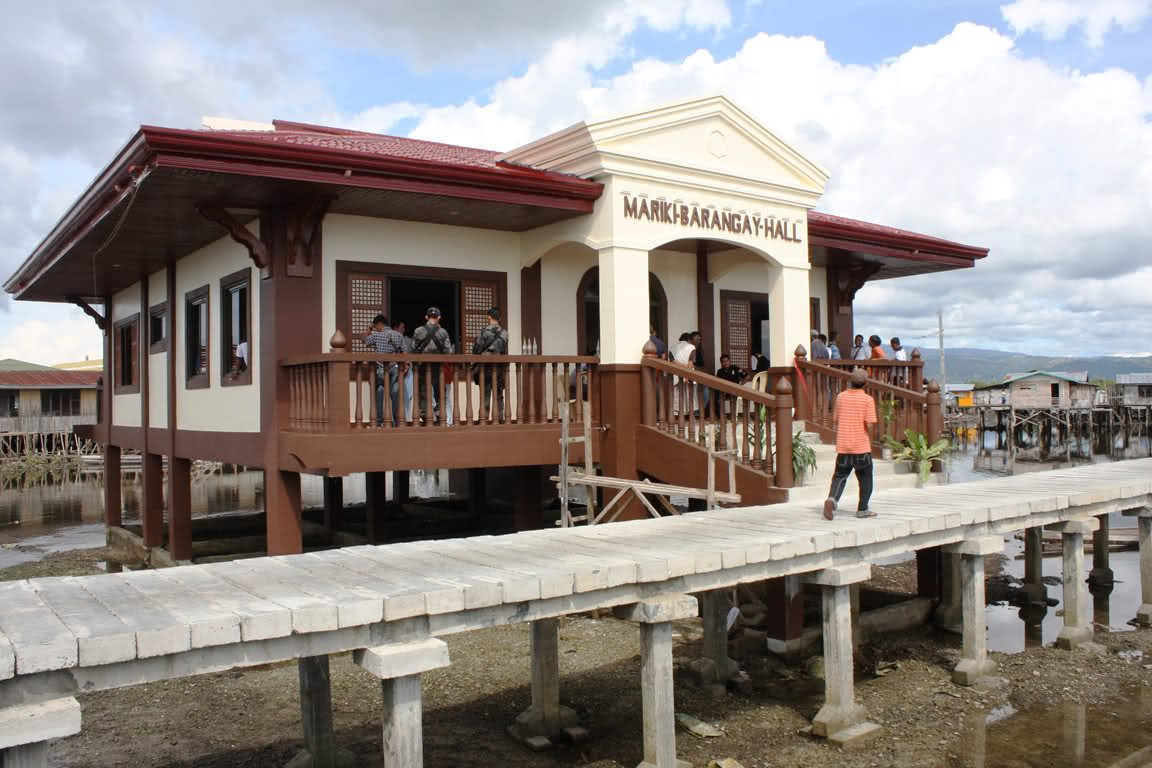
Mariki's barangay hall in Zamboanga City

The modern barangay is headed by elected officials, with the barangay captain serving as its chief executive. The barangay captain is assisted by the Sangguniang Barangay (barangay council), whose seven members, called barangay councilors, are also elected. The barangay is generally governed from its seat of local government, the barangay hall.

The Sangguniang Barangay serves as the legislative council of the barangay. It is composed of the barangay captain, seven barangay councilors, and the chairperson of the Sangguniang Kabataan (SK), who serves as an ex officio member.

The barangay captain presides over meetings of the Sangguniang Barangay and may vote when necessary to break a tie. In the absence of an SK, the Sangguniang Barangay elects an acting SK chairperson from among the qualified members of the barangay.

The Barangay Justice System, or Katarungang Pambarangay, is composed of members commonly known as the Lupon Tagapamayapa. Its function is to conciliate and mediate disputes at the barangay level, helping to avoid litigation and reduce the caseload of the courts.

Barangay elections are non-partisan. The barangay captain is elected by first-past-the-post plurality, while the seven barangay councilors are elected by plurality at-large voting, with the entire barangay serving as a single at-large district. Each voter may vote for up to seven candidates for councilor, with the seven candidates receiving the most votes elected. A ticket typically consists of one candidate for barangay captain and seven candidates for councilor.

A barangay tanod, or barangay police officer, is an unarmed watchman who performs policing functions within the barangay. The number of barangay tanods varies from one barangay to another; they help maintain law and order in communities throughout the Philippines.

Funding for the barangay comes from its share of the National Tax Allotment (NTA), formerly known as the Internal Revenue Allotment (IRA), with a portion of the allotment set aside for the SK. The exact amount is determined by a formula based on the barangay's population and land area.

Local government hierarchy

President of the Philippines
Autonomous regions
Provinces	Independent cities	Provinces	Independent cities
Component cities	Municipalities	Component cities	Municipalities
Barangays	Barangays	Barangays	Barangays	Barangays	Barangays

The dashed lines emanating from the president means that the President only exercises general supervision on local government.

Number of local government units in the Philippines
Type (English)	Filipino equivalent	Head of administration	Filipino equivalent	Number
Province	Lalawigan/Probinsya	Governor	Punong lalawigan/Gobernador	82
City	Lungsod/Siyudad	Mayor	Punong lungsod/Alkalde	149
Municipality	Bayan/Munisipalidad	Mayor	Punong bayan/Alkalde	1,493
Barangay	Barangay	Barangay captain	Punong barangay	42,011

== See also ==
- Poblacion
- Barrio
- Association of Barangay Captains
- Balangay
- Barangay Health Volunteers
- Purok
- Sitio
- Desa (Indonesia)

== Bibliography ==
- Constantino, Renato. (1975) The Philippines: A Past Revisited (volume 1). ISBN 971-8958-00-2
- Mamuel Merino, O.S.A., ed., Conquistas de las Islas Filipinas (1565–1615), Madrid: Consejo Superior de Investigaciones Cientificas, 1975.
