= Luis Teodoro =

Luis V. Teodoro (August 24, 1941 – March 13, 2023) was a Filipino journalist, media critic, academic, and press freedom advocate best known for his work in defending press freedom during Martial law under Ferdinand Marcos, for heading the Center for Media Freedom and Responsibility (CMFR) and the media network Altermidya, for his long-time "Vantage Point" column in the Philippine Business broadsheet BusinessWorld, and for his long and consequential two terms as Dean of UP College of Media and Communication (CMC) from 1994 to 2000.

== See also ==
- Chit Estella
