= Vicente L. Rafael =

Filipino author and academic (1956–2026)

- Born: February 16, 1956; Manila, Philippines
- Died: February 21, 2026 (aged 70)
- Citizenship: Dual, Filipino/American
- Known for: Contracting Colonialism; "White Love"; The Promise of the Foreign"; "Motherless Tongues"; "The Sovereign Trickster"
- Awards: Guggenheim Fellowship; Grant Goodman Award; Rockefeller Fellowship, Bellagio; Humanities Research Institute, UCI; Philippine National Book Award (1988, 2000), Gawad Pambansang Alagad ni Balagtas (2017) among others.

Academic background
- Education: Ateneo de Manila University (B.A.); Cornell University (MA, PhD)
- Doctoral advisor: David Wyatt; James T. Siegel; Dominick LaCapra; Benedict Anderson

Academic work
- Discipline: Southeast Asian Studies, History
- Institutions: University of Washington, Seattle

Vicente L. Rafael (February 16, 1956 – February 21, 2026) was a Filipino author and academic who was professor of Southeast Asian history at the University of Washington, Seattle. He received his B.A. in history and philosophy from Ateneo de Manila University in 1977 and his Ph.D. in history at Cornell University in 1984. Prior to teaching at the University of Washington, Rafael taught at the University of California, San Diego, and the University of Hawaii at Manoa. At the time of his death, he sat on the advisory boards for the Duke University Press journals Cultural Anthropology, Public Culture, and positions.

== Research ==
Rafael researched and taught on Southeast Asia, particularly the Philippines, comparative colonialism, particularly of Spain and the United States, and comparative nationalism. Though a historian, he also focused on the related fields of cultural anthropology and literary studies and pursued topics ranging from language and power, translation and religious conversion, technology and humanity, and the politics and poetics of representation.

== Publications ==
In 1988, Cornell University Press published Rafael's first book, Contracting Colonialism, subtitled Translation and Christian Conversion in Tagalog Society Under Early Spanish Rule, in which he examined the role of language and translation in the religious conversion of Tagalogs to Catholicism during the early period of Spanish rule of the Philippines. It was later reissued by multiple other publishers, including Duke University Press and Ateneo de Manila University Press. This was followed by a 1995 collection edited by Rafael and published by Temple University Press entitled Discrepant Histories: Translocal Essays on Filipino Cultures which studied a number of issues in the formation of the Philippine nation-state and translocal Filipino cultures. His next book, published in 1999 by Cornell University Press, was Figures of Criminality in Indonesia, the Philippines, and Colonial Vietnam, a collection of essays on the relationships between criminality and colonial state formation.

In 2000, Duke University Press published Rafael's White Love and Other Events in Filipino History, a challenging of traditional, epic narratives of Filipino history and the emergence of revolutionary nationalism which focused on "episodic" instances of Filipino subject production throughout periods of colonization and independence. The Promise of the Foreign: Nationalism and the Technics of Translation in the Spanish Philippines, also published by Duke University Press, appeared in 2005 and is the second volume of Contracting Colonialism. Its main argument is that translation was crucial to the emergence of Filipino nationalism, a mechanism from which was issued the promise of nationhood. This book was followed by Motherless Tongues: The Insurgency of Language Amid Wars of Translation, also published by Duke UP in 2016, which delved into topics ranging from the colonial introduction of English in the Philippines to the fate of interpreters in Iraq during wartime. Rafael also wrote the introduction to a volume of the works by Nick Joaquin, The Woman Who Had Two Navels and Tales of the Tropical Gothic which was released in 2017 from Penguin Classics.

In 2022, Rafael published his final book, The Sovereign Trickster: Death and Laughter in the Age of Duterte, also under Duke UP, which drew upon biopolitical and necropolitical theories of the state to describe what he called a "prismatic history" of the social conditions and historical contexts that lead towards the vigilante regime of former Philippine president Rodrigo Duterte.

== Personal life and death ==
Rafael was in a relationship with Lila Shahani, the daughter of former senator Leticia Ramos-Shahani. He died on February 21, 2026, five days after his 70th birthday, after having had bone cancer, diabetes and arteriosclerosis in his later years.
