= Caroline Hau =

Caroline Sy Hau
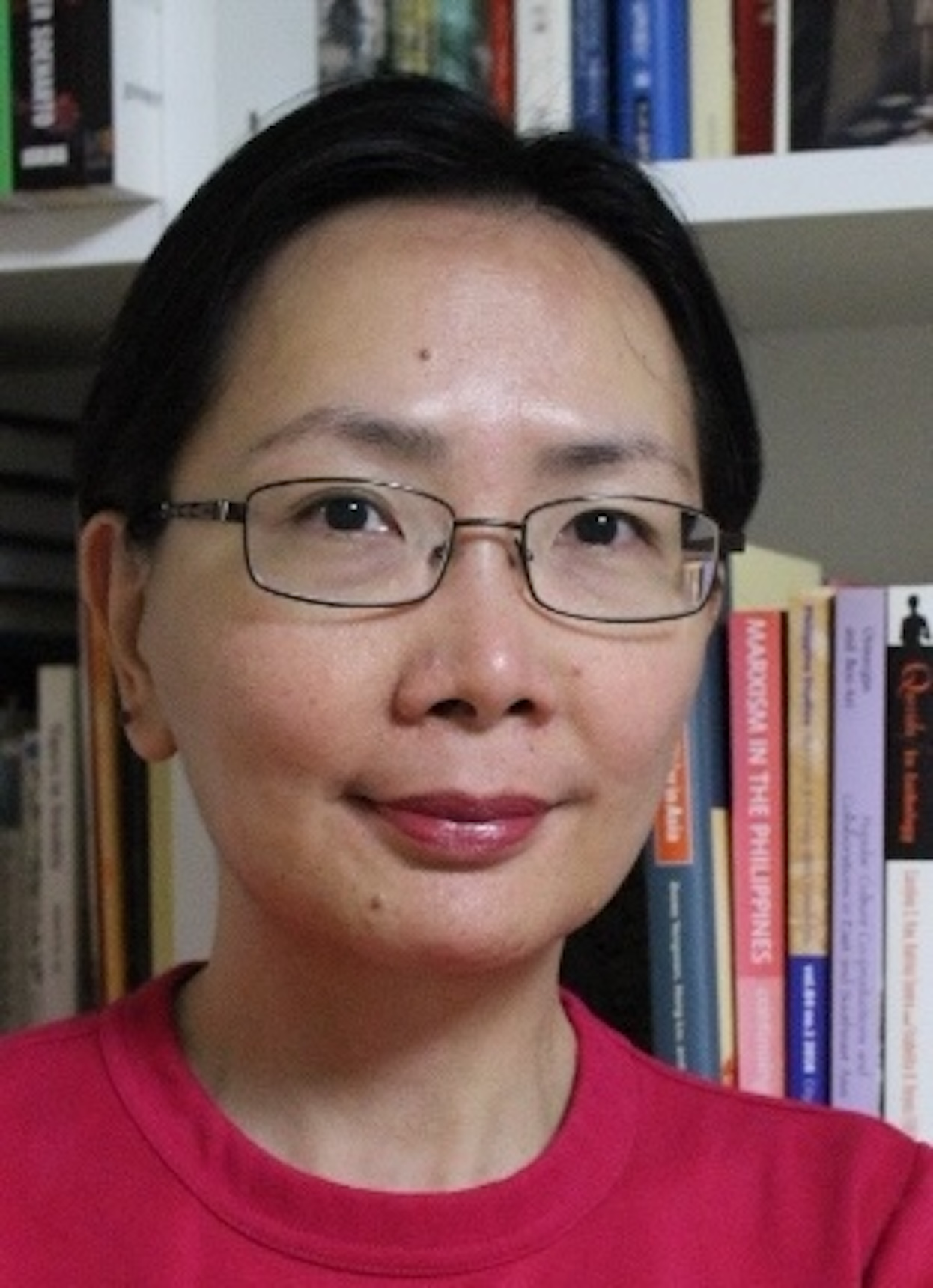

Personal details
- Born: Caroline Sy Hau (施蘊玲); August 30, 1969 (age 57)
- Education: University of the Philippines Diliman (BA); Cornell University (MA, Ph.D)

Caroline Sy Hau (施蘊玲, born 30 August 1969) is a Chinese-Filipino author and academic known for her work on Filipino culture and literature and for her books The Chinese Question: Ethnicity, Nation and Region In and Beyond the Philippines and Necessary Fictions: Philippine Literature and the Nation, 1946—1980.

== Biography ==
Caroline Sy Hau obtained her B.A. in English Studies, summa cum laude, from the University of the Philippines Diliman and her M.A. and Ph.D. in English Language and Literature from Cornell University, where she was recipient of the Lauriston Sharp Prize.

Her story “Grief” (also known as “The Grindstones”) was a grand-prize winner for fiction in English at the 1990 UP National Writers Workshop, while “Recuerdos de Patay” and “The True Story of Ah To” were winners (first and second prizes respectively) of the Free Press Literary Awards.

Eight of her books—including Necessary Fictions: Philippine Literature and the Nation, 1946-1980, Interpreting Rizal, Elites and Ilustrados in Philippine Culture, Recuerdos de Patay and Other Stories, and Tiempo Muerto(novel) --received Philippine National Book Awards.

She has taught at the University of the Philippines Diliman and Kyoto University. She is a recipient of the Grant Goodman Prize in Historical Studies from the Philippine Studies Group of the Association of Asian Studies (U.S.A.) and the Gawad Balagtas from the Writers’ Union of the Philippines. Her latest book is Character: Essays.

Caroline S. Hau received the Fukuoka Prize 2026 Academic Prize.

Hau co-writes a blog with fellow writer Trixie Alano Reguyal titled ikangablog.

== Published works ==
- “Daydreaming about Rizal and Tetchō: On Asianism as Network and Fantasy,” Philippine Studies: Historical and Ethnographic Viewpoints 57(3)(2009): 329–88 (Co-author: Takashi Shiraishi)
- Elite: An Anthology. (Ed. with Katrina Tuvera and Isabelita O. Reyes) Anvil Publishing. (2016).
- Elites and Ilustrados in Philippine Culture. Ateneo de Manila University Press. (2017).
- Interpreting Rizal (Ateneo de Manila University Press, 2018)
- Necessary Fictions: Philippine Literature and the Nation, 1946—1980. Ateneo de Manila University Press. (2000)
- On the Subject of the Nation: Filipino Writings from the Margins, 1981—2004. Ateneo de Manila University Press. (2004)
- Recuerdos de Patay and Other Stories. University of the Philippines Press. (2015).
- Siting Postcoloniality: Critical Perspectives from the East Asian Sinosphere (Duke University Press, 2022. Co-editor: Pheng Cheah)
- The Chinese Question: Ethnicity, Nation and Region In and Beyond the Philippines. Ateneo de Manila University Press. (2014).
- Tiempo Muerto: A Novel. Ateneo de Manila University Press. (2019)
- Traveling Nation-Makers: Transnational Flows and Movements in the Making of Modern Southeast Asia (Kyoto University Press and NUS Press, 2011. Co-editor: Kasian Tejapira)

== Additional Information ==
- “The Best of Worlds: An Interview with Caroline Hau” (CSEAS Newsletter No. 6 (2022))
- Caroline S. Hau, “Cabinet of Curiosities” (CSEAS Newsletter No. 82 (May 2024))
- Caroline S. Hau, “Horsepower” (CSEAS Newsletter No. 83 (June 2025))
- Caroline Hau, “For Whom Are Southeast Asian Studies?” (The 11th Frank H. Golay Memorial Lecture on Oct. 25, 2019.)–Cornell Video
- Caroline S. Hau, "On Not Reading Rizal" (Literatur Review (Munich) November 10, 2024))

== See also ==
- Virgilio S. Almario
- Benedict Anderson
- Cecilia Brainard
- Linda Ty Casper
- Xiao Chua
- Leloy Claudio
- Reynaldo Ileto
- F. Sionil Jose
- Resil Mojares
- Danton Remoto
- Hope Sabanpan-Yu
- Jessica Zafra
