= Neil Doloricon =

Neil Doloricon (1957–2021) was a Filipino visual artist, printmaker, social critic, and academic who was one of the Philippines' foremost social realists. His works were known for themes of poverty, class struggle, and state repression. During the Marcos dictatorship, he founded the Kaisahan artist collective, and served first as chair and then as chair emeritus of the Concerned Artists of the Philippines. After the Marcoses were deposed, he continued with his advocacies and eventually became dean of the UP College of Fine Arts, and also served on the board of the IBON Foundation. He also chaired the Committee on Arts and Humanities of the Philippines' Commission on Higher Education. In 1990, the Cultural Center of the Philippines gave him the Thirteen Artists Award and the Gawad para sa Sining Biswal. Some of his notable works include "Welga" (1981, oil on canvas and collaged newspaper), "US Bases Gahasa sa Soberanya" (2013, oil on canvas), and Pila (2020, linocut print) linocut print, Pila (2020).

== See also ==
- Toym Imao
- Egai Talusan Fernandez
- Jerry Araos
