= Ateneo de Manila University Press =

Philippine university press

Coordinates: 14°38′30.23″N 121°4′47.34″E

- Parent company: Ateneo de Manila University
- Founded: 1972
- Country of origin: Philippines
- Headquarters location: Manila
- Publication types: Books
- Imprints: BlueBooks, Bughaw
- Official website: unipress.ateneo.edu

The Ateneo de Manila University Press is a university press and the official publishing house of Ateneo de Manila University in the Philippines. It was established in 1972 and operates as an auxiliary unit in the university's structure.

== Awards ==
The Ateneo de Manila University Press was named Publisher of the Year by the National Book Awards from 2017 to 2023. It topped the Aklatan, an all-Filipino online book fair, in 2020.

In 2016, the Ateneo University Press launched 21 new publications in Harvest 2016.
