= Reynaldo Ileto =

Filipino historian (born 1946)

Reynaldo "Rey" Clemeña Ileto (born October 3, 1946) is a Filipino historian known for his seminal work Pasyon and Revolution: Popular Movements in the Philippines, 1840–1910, first published in 1979. Ileto specializes in Asian history, religion and society, postcolonial studies, and the government and politics of Asia and the Pacific. He is known for his interdisciplinary approach combining history, literature, anthropology, cultural studies, and politics.

Ileto is currently an honorary professor at the Australian National University. He previously taught at the National University of Singapore and the University of the Philippines. Ileto finished his undergraduate degree at the Jesuit-run Ateneo de Manila University and received his Ph.D. in Southeast Asian History at Cornell University in 1975.

In 2003, Ileto received a Fukuoka academic prize for his scholarship.

== Pasyon and Revolution ==
In this work, Ileto explores the possibility of understanding the 1896 Philippine Revolution and its peasant following, and subsequently the various popular movements that emerged, through the pasyón, a widely popular religious document narrating in verse Christ's suffering and redemption. According to Ileto, the document's structure and content [i.e., a pattern of suffering and sacrifice ending in Christ's resurrection, from kadiliman (darkness) towards liwanag (light), from bayang sawi (forsaken land) towards a lost Eden] may have shaped how the common tao understood the Revolution—in effect, providing the Christianized peoples a "language for articulating its own values, ideals, and hopes of liberation." Put differently, Pasyon suggests that the Christian religion, once an instrument of the Spanish colonizer in the pacification of the islands became the means (through the syncretic and indigenous pasyon) towards the emancipation of the native people.

The book explores the cases of Hermano Pule and the Cofradía de San José (Confraternity of St. Joseph), a millenarian peasant movement in Luzon; revolutionary leader Andres Bonifacio and the Katipunan in 1896 (wherein which the leaders of the Katipunan, Ileto argues, may have used a pasyon rhetoric to attract followers to the nascent secret society); Emilio Aguinaldo's elite-led Republican revolution; Macario Sakay's Tagalog Republic and continued resistance to "benevolent assimilation"; and later peasant leader Felipe Salvador and the Santa Iglesia struggle in the early years of American occupation.

Pasyon challenged the dominant narrative of an ilustrado or elite-led revolution. According to this view, it is the unequal relationship between the principalía (the provincial elites) and their poorer, dependent clients, kinship ties, and the cultural trait of utang-na-loob (debt of gratitude) which proved to be the "dominant modes of mobilization" during the revolution. By using an ignored “master text” such as the pasyon, Ileto offers an alternative reading of the period.

Ileto advanced a "history from below" approach in the work, stressing the agency of the common man, and as a scholarly objective, sought for an exploration of an indigenous rationality to discover a wider "possibility of meanings" in Philippine history.

== Scholarly critique of Pasyon ==
Some historians such as Milagros C. Guerrero challenged the unconventional approach of Pasyon particularly in its use of non-traditional sources such as literary documents, poems, including religious folk traditions and rituals, previously ignored and marginalised in Philippine historiography. In her arguments, Guerrero stressed the importance of the socioeconomic structures and patterns prevalent at the time including the spread of ilustrado and secular thought; the entrenched patron-client relationship; and the linguistic Catholic unity among both ilustrado and masa at the time of the revolution.

Scholar Joseph Scalice, meanwhile, critiques Ileto's treatment of the pasyon primarily as text, in particular, in relegating its significance as performance thus treating the pasyon in an "ahistorical manner," concluding that “attentiveness to performance demonstrates that the pasyon was a cross-class and linguistically specific phenomenon.” Scalice likewise finds problematic Ileto's ambiguous conception of the masa as social class.

== Personal life ==
Ileto's father is former Department of National Defense (DND) Secretary and Vice Chief of Staff of the Armed Forces of the Philippines (AFP) Rafael Ileto.

== Published books ==
- Maguindanao, 1860–1888: The Career of Datu Utto of Buayan. (1971). Cornell University Southeast Asia Program Series No. 82.
- Pasyon and Revolution: Popular Movements in the Philippines, 1840–1910. (1979). Ateneo de Manila University Press.
- Filipinos and their Revolution: Event, Discourse, and Historiography. (1998). Ateneo de Manila University Press.
- Knowledge and Pacification: On the U.S. Conquest and the Writing of Philippine History. (2017). Ateneo de Manila University Press.

== See also ==
=== Books and articles ===
- Puaksom, D. (2017). Rēnandō ʻIlētō: mūanchon khon chanlāng prawattisāt hǣng chāt læ khwāmrū bǣp ʻānānikhom [Reynaldo Ileto: Lower Classes, National History and Colonial Knowledges]. ฺBangkok: Sommadhi. (in Thai) ISBN 9786167196787

=== Filipino scholars ===
- Resil Mojares, Filipino historian and scholar
- Teodoro Agoncillo, Filipino nationalist historian
- Renato Constantino
- Gregorio F. Zaide
- Carlos Quirino
- Ambeth Ocampo
- Caroline Hau
- Vicente L. Rafael
