= Resil B. Mojares =

Filipino historian and literary critic (1943–2026)

Resil Mojares
- Mojares in 2018
- Born: Resil Buagas Mojares; September 4, 1943; Dipolog, Zamboanga, Commonwealth of the Philippines
- Died: September 5, 2026 (aged 83)
- Education: University of San Carlos (BA, MA); University of the Philippines Diliman (Ph.D.)
- Occupations: Historian, literary critic
- Spouse: Salvacion Ouano Go (died 2022)
- Children: 4
- Writing career
- Notable awards: Order of National Artists of the Philippines, Palanca Awards for Short Story

Resil Buagas Mojares (September 4, 1943 – September 5, 2026) was a Filipino historian and critic of Philippine literature best known for his books on Philippine history. He was acclaimed by various writers and critics as the Visayan Titan of Letters, due to his immense contribution to Visayan literature. He was recognized in 2018 as a National Artist of the Philippines for Literature - a conferment which represents the Philippine state's highest recognition for artists.

== Early life and education ==
Mojares was born to parents who were public school teachers on September 4, 1943, in the barrio of Polanco, Dipolog, Zamboanga province (now Polanco, Zamboanga del Norte). His mother hails from Ginatilan in Cebu.

He had a bachelor's degree in English at the University of San Carlos (USC). He later obtained a master's degree in literature in 1969 and completed his graduate studies at thein anthropology in 1974, both in USC. He then earned his doctorate in literature from the University of the Philippines Diliman which he earned in 1979.

== Career ==
Mojares started his writing career back when he was a student. He made submission to the Philippine Free Press Annual Short Story Contest where he won prizes.

He wrote for the Cebu-based broadsheet The Freeman. In his column Sticks and Stones, Mojares wrote of his suspicion on the military's activities and the arrest of youth activist by the administration of President Ferdinand Marcos Sr.. He was arrested on September 23, 1972, the day Marcos announced that he had placed the Philippines under Martial Law and was detained at the Camp Sergio Osmeña. He was released conditionally after the local press association intervened. However he remained confined in Cebu from 1972 to 1979, and was unable to leave the province province without permission from the authorities.

A became a professor full time at the University of San Carlos (USC) in Cebu City in 1983. He was also the founding director of USC's Cebuano Studies Center, a local studies center in the Philippines, from 1975 to 1996.

Mojares authored books on Philippine history, literature, and politics, including studies on three eminent Filipino intellectuals (Pedro Paterno, T. H. Pardo de Tavera, and Isabelo de los Reyes).

He was a recipient of six Philippine National Book Awards. His books include The War Against the Americans: Resistance and Collaboration in Cebu Province; Aboitiz: Family & Firm in the Philippines; House of Memory: Essays; and Vicente Sotto, The Maverick Senator (Cebuano Studies Center, 1992).

Mojares was a visiting professor at Kyoto University, the National University of Singapore, and the University of California at Los Angeles where he lectured on "The Philippine Novel" and "Topics in Philippine Cultural History".

He wrote the history of Cebu Province for the Cebu Town History Project, which was published in 2014.

In 2019, Mojares was recognized as one of the Top 100 Cebuano personalities by The Freeman, Cebu's longest-running newspaper. He was recognized alongside Tomas Osmeña, Max Surban, and Rubilen Amit as part of the centennial anniversary of the local newspaper.

== Personal life and death ==
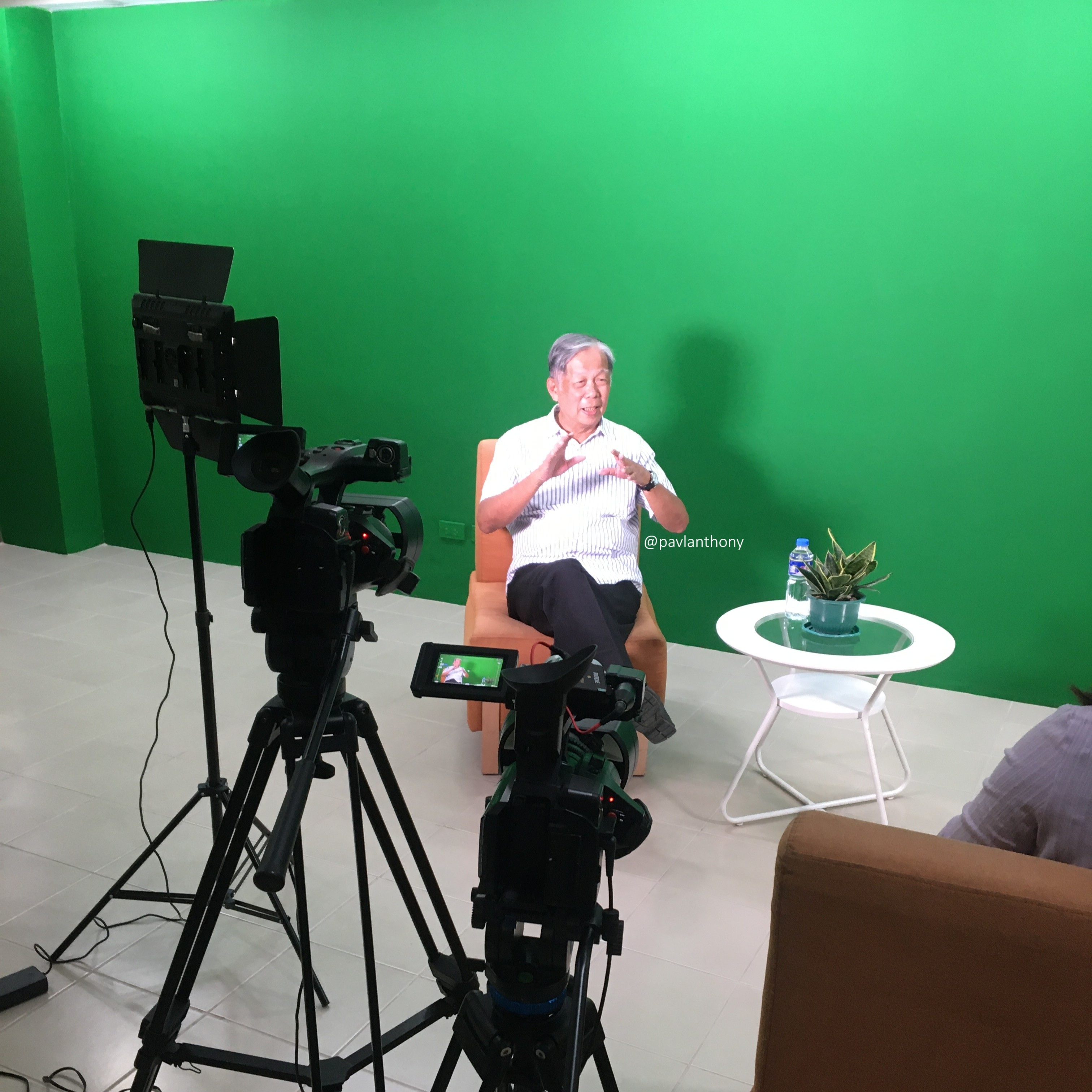
Mojares at the University of San Carlos in 2022

Mojares was married to Salvacion Ouano Go, and had four children together. He resided in Barangay Talamban in Cebu City. Mojares became a widower in 2022 before his own death on September 5, 2026, at the age of 83. Following this, the Philippine government declared a day of national mourning for the day of his funeral, which was held on September 12 at the Cebu Memorial Parks and Gardens.

== Notable works ==
- Cebuano Literature: A Survey and Bio-Bibliography with Reading List (Cebu City: San Carlos Publications, 1975).
- Origins and Rise of the Filipino Novel: A Generic Study of the Novel Until 1940 (Quezon City, UP Press, 1983; second ed. 1998)
- Theater in Society, Society in Theater: Social History of a Cebuano Village, 1840-1940 (Quezon City: Ateneo de Manila University Press, 1985).
- The Man Who Would Be President: Serging Osmeña and Philippine Politics (Cebu City: Maria Cacao, 1986)
- Vicente Sotto: The Maverick Senator (Cebu City: Cebuano Studies Center, 1992; second ed. 2021).
- House of Memory: Essays (Mandaluying City: Anvil Publishing, 1997)
- The War Against the Americans: Resistance and Collaboration in Cebu, 1899-1906 (Quezon City: Ateneo de Manila University Press, 1999)
- Waiting for Mariang Makiling: Essays on Philippine Cultural History (Quezon City: Ateneo de Manila University Press, 2002)
- Brains of the Nation: Pedro Paterno, T.H. Pardo de Tavera, Isabelo de los Reyes and the Production of Modern Knowledge (Quezon City: Ateneo de Manila University Press, 2006)
- Isabelo’s Archive (Mandaluyong City: Anvil Publishing, 2013).
- The Feast of the Santo Niño: An Introduction to the History of a Cebuano Devotion (Cebu City: University of San Carlos Press, 2017).
- Interrogations in Philippine Cultural History (Quezon City: Ateneo de Manila University Press, 2017)
- Enigmatic Objects: Notes Towards a History of the Museum in the Philippines (Quezon City: Ateneo de Manila University Press, 2023)

== See also ==
- National Artist of the Philippines
- Carlos Quirino
