= List of branches of psychology =

This non-exhaustive list contains many of the sub-fields within the field of psychology:

- Abnormal psychology
- Analytical psychology
- Animal psychology
- Anomalistic psychology
- Applied behavior analysis
- Applied psychology
- Asian psychology
- Aviation psychology
- Behavioral psychology
- Behavioral genetics
- Behavioral medicine
- Biopsychology
- Black psychology
- Cognitive neuropsychology
- Cognitive psychology
- Community psychology
- Comparative psychology
- Clinical behavior analysis
- Clinical psychology
- Consumer psychology
- Consulting psychology
- Counseling psychology
- Criminal psychology
- Critical psychology
- Cross-cultural psychology
- Cultural neuroscience
- Cultural psychology
- Cyberpsychology
- Developmental psychology
- Differential psychology
- Discursive psychology
- Dual-brain psychology
- Ecological psychology
- Economic psychology
- Educational psychology
- Engineering psychology
- Environmental psychology
- Evolutionary psychology
- Experimental analysis of behavior
- Experimental psychology
- Filipino psychology
- Forensic psychology
- Health psychology
- Humanistic psychology
- Imaginal psychology
- Indian psychology
- Indigenous psychology
- Individual differences psychology
- Industrial and organizational psychology
- International psychology
- Investigative psychology
- Legal psychology
- Mathematical psychology
- Media psychology
- Medical psychology
- Military psychology
- Moral psychology
- Music psychology
- Neuropsychology
- Occupational health psychology
- Parapsychology
- Peace psychology
- Performance psychology
- Personality psychology
- Philosophy of psychology
- Physiological psychology
- Police psychology
- Political psychology
- Positive psychology
- Pre- and perinatal psychology
- Problem solving
- Psychoanalysis
- Psychohistory
- Psycholinguistics
- Psychology and law
- Psychology of art
- Psychology of eating meat
- Psychology of religion
- Psychometrics
- Psychonomics
- Psycho-oncology
- Psychopathology
- Psychopharmacology
- Psychophysics
- Psychophysiology
- Psychotherapy
- Quantitative psychology
- Rehabilitation psychology
- Social psychology
- Sports psychology
- Systems psychology
- Theoretical psychology
- Traffic psychology
- Transpersonal psychology

== See also ==
- List of psychology topics
