= Walang utang na loob =

"Walang utang na loob" is a Filipino expression used to describe ungratefulness or the act of disregarding a "debt of gratitude". It is related to the Filipino cultural trait utang na loob, which literally means "debt of one's inner self (loob) and is often translated to "debt of gratitude".

== Definition ==
The expression in relation to the cultural trait literally means "without debt inside". The phrase usually implies that an individual has "acted in an extremely ungrateful fashion or has refused to honor an important obligation," which indicates "a serious point of social conflict between two individuals." Previous studies on Philippine values point to the expression as one of three "evil characters" in interpersonal relations, characterizing it as ineptness in reciprocating through gratitude.

== Usage ==
"Walang utang na loob" carries an especially heavy connotation and is used to describe an individual who is "ungrateful". It is generally used to say that someone does not know how to show gratitude in return for a sort of service or kindness shown to them. Its usage carries serious implications that the individual being referred to is lacking in respect, honor, and gratitude.

== Cultural implications ==
Most of the time, the expression is used in a familial context, which is heavily influenced by cultural factors. This is largely rooted in the concept of birth being a gift from parents. Utang na loob is initiated from the expectation that children are born "to provide for their parents in their old age since they owe not only their life but also their entire education to their parents." As such, children are born into existing obligations and "obligation relationships" with their parents (and other elders), which is further reinforced by the care these children are shown by the elders later in life. In some cases, the obligational relationship extends to older siblings who helped provide the needs and education of the child. In showing this sense of utang na loob, one is expected to respect elders and to honor the obligations of the family. Inability to do so entails being labelled as someone who has "no honor or gratitude - signifying that one is not a "good" child, much less a decent person."

Aside from the desire to fulfill an utang na loob being a driving force in the lives of Filipinos, the desire not to be called "walang utang na loob", due to its negative implications, also serves a similar purpose. Gratitude and the desire to fulfill one's obligations go hand in hand with the fear of being called ungrateful and disrespectful. For instance, college students apply to their chosen studies in order to avoid being labelled as someone who is "walang utang na loob". Rather than choosing their own interests, they choose to fulfill the wishes of their parents.

Other examples of situations that incur utang na loob are being loaned money during financial difficulty, receiving emotional support during difficult phases in life, and receiving other forms of support during serious situations. These actions, when not appropriately reciprocated based on cultural standards, can also give rise to walang utang na loob.

== See also ==
- Culture of the Philippines
