= Filipino values =

Set of values held by a majority of Filipinos

Filipino values are social constructs within Filipino culture which define that which is socially considered to be desirable. The Filipino value system describes "the commonly shared and traditionally established system of values underlying Filipino behavior" within the context of the larger Filipino cultural system. These relate to the unique assemblage of consistent ideologies, moral codes, ethical practices, etiquette and personal and cultural values that are promoted by Filipino society.

The formal study of Filipino values has been made difficult by the historical context of the literature in the field. The early scholarship about the Filipino value system lacked clear definitions and organizational frameworks, and were mostly written by foreigners during the Philippines' American colonial period. The latter half of the 20th century saw efforts to develop clearer definitions and properly contextualized frameworks, but many aspects of the scholarship require further clarification and consensus.

The distinct value system of Filipinos has generally been described as rooted primarily in personal alliance systems, especially those based in kinship, obligation, friendship, religion (particularly Christianity) and commercial relationships.

== Philosophical basis ==
Filipino values are, for the most part, centered at maintaining social harmony, motivated primarily by the desire to be accepted within a group. The main sanction against diverging from these values are the concepts of Tagalog: hiya, roughly translated as 'a sense of shame', and 'amor propio' or 'self-esteem'. Social approval, acceptance by a group, and belonging to a group are major concerns. Caring about what others will think, say or do, are strong influences on social behavior among Filipinos.

According to the anthropologist Leonardo Mercado, the Filipino worldview is basically 'nondualistic'. Based on his linguistic analyses of Filipino value terms like loob (Cebuano: buot), he concludes that Filipinos desire harmony, not only in interpersonal relationships, but also with nature and religion, while still remaining nondichotomous.

"The Filipino wants to harmonize the object and the subject, while at the same time holding both as distinct."

— Elements of Filipino Philosophy (1974), Leonardo Mercado, SVD

Florentino Timbreza, a cultural philosopher, concludes in his book Pilosopiyang Pilipino (1982) that Filipino values are based on the significance of the world to man. Life experiences dictate the philosophy of the Filipino, augmented by other sources like proverbs, folk sayings, folk tales, and the like.

== Models of the Filipino values ==
F. Landa Jocano identified two models of the Filipino value system. The first is the exogenous model, a "foreign model", while the second is the indigenous model, or the "traditional model". The foreign model is described to be "legal and formal". The indigenous model is described as a "traditional and non-formal" model or guide, deeply embedded in the subconscious of the Filipinos.

The foreign model was inherited by Filipinos from Western cultures, particularly from the Spaniards and the Americans. An example of a foreign or exogenous influence is bureaucracy exhibited in the government of the Philippines.

== Elements and composition ==
Based on studies, surveys, opinions, anecdotes, and other literatures made by experts and researchers in relation to "Filipino social values" or "Filipino core values", along with the Filipino character or Filipino identity of a person or an individual known as the Filipino, the Filipino value system are found to possess inherent key elements.

One can note how hiya ('propriety, dignity'), pakikisama ('companionship, esteem'), and utang na loob ('gratitude, solidarity'), are merely "surface values"—readily seen and observed values exhibited and esteemed by many Filipinos. These three values are considered branches from a single origin—the actual core values of the Filipino personality—kapwa, meaning 'togetherness'. It refers to community, or not doing things alone. Kapwa has two categories, Ibang Tao ('other people') and Hindi Ibang Tao ('not other people'). The surface values spin off from the core value through the "pivotal aspect" of pakikiramdam, or shared inner perception ('feeling for another').

Other notable elements or motivations are optimism about the future, pessimism with regards to present situations and events, the concern and care for other people, the existence of friendship and friendliness, the habit of being hospitable, religious nature, respectfulness to self and others, respect for the female members of society, the fear of God, and abhorrence of acts of cheating and thievery.

The values of Filipinos specifically upholds the following items: solidarity of the family unit, security of the Philippine economy, orientation to small-groups, personalism, the concepts of "loob" or kalooban (meaning "what’s inside the self", the "inner-self", or the "actual personal feelings of the self"), existence and maintenance of smooth interpersonal relationships, and the sensing of the feelings or needs of others (known as pakikiramdam). In a larger picture, these values are grouped into general clusters or "macroclusters": namely, the relationship cluster, the social cluster, the livelihood cluster, the inwardness cluster, and the optimism cluster.

== Value enumeration ==
=== Family oriented ===
The basic and most important unit of a Filipino's life is the family. Young Filipinos who turn 18 are not expected to move out of their parents' home. When a Filipino's parents are old and cannot take care of themselves, they are cared for in their children's homes and are very rarely brought by their children to homes for the aged. The practice of separating the elderly from the rest of the family, while common in Western countries, is often looked down upon in Filipino society. Family lunches with the extended family of up to 50 people, extending until the line of second cousins, are not unusual. The Filipino culture puts a great emphasis on the value of family and being close to one's family members.

=== Humor and positivity ===
This famous trait is the ability of Filipinos to find humor in everything. It sheds light on the optimism and positivity of Filipinos in whatever situation they are in so as to remain determined in going through struggles or challenges. It serves as a coping technique, the same way a child who has fallen laughs at himself/herself to hide his/her embarrassment.

=== Flexibility, adaptability, discipline, and creativity ===
Filipinos adapt to different sets of standardized rules or procedures. They are known to follow a "natural clock" or organic sense of time—doing things in the time they feel is right. They are present- and future-oriented: one attends to a task or requirement at the time, and, often, in preparation for future engagements. Filipinos do not tend to dwell in the past unless it serves to help them understand the present and future. This allows the Filipino to adapt and integrate well into different cultures, and create effective case-by-case schedules.

=== Education and multilingualism ===
Filipinos place a high value on holistic child education with a belief in parental involvement in their children's success. Filipinos believe in the importance of multilingualism and multiculturalism; in the Philippines, there are over 120 distinct languages based in different regions spoken by different tribes and ethnic groups. At school, children are educated foremost in their regional language. There are eight most widely-spoken Filipino regional languages: Tagalog, Cebuano, Ilocano, Hiligaynon or Ilonggo, Bikol, Waray, Pampangan, and Pangasinense. Next, children learn their country's two national languages: Filipino (Tagalog) and English. Effectively, by adulthood, children are often at least proficiently bilingual or trilingual.

=== Religious adherence ===
The Philippines is approximately 85 percent Christian (mostly Roman Catholic) and 10 percent Muslim, with the remaining 5 percent belonging to other religions including Taoism, Buddhism and the Dayawism of the highlands. The combined percentages of Christian and Muslim faithful are indicative of the strong or at least nominal faith most Filipinos have in the existence, agency and power of a creator deity.

With regard to the Catholic majority, it observes numerous Church holidays, notwithstanding the fewer holy days of obligation compared to the faithful of other countries. Attendance of Mass is high not only on Sundays but also on national and regional feast days, and abstention from Communion is almost unheard of. Catholicism also provides the basis for many citizens' positions on moral, ethical and everyday issues. Extreme practices, officially frowned upon by the clergy, take place during Holy Week.

=== Ability to survive and thrive ===
The Filipinos have survived the rule of numerous colonial and imperial countries of their time such as the United States, Spain, and Japan. Consequently, Filipinos have developed a sense of resourcefulness or the ability to survive and thrive irrespective of the political context. They have an extraordinary ability to thrive despite perceived or actual material, social, or political limitations.

=== Hard work and industriousness ===
Filipinos are very determined and persevering in accomplishing whatever they set their minds to.

Filipinos over the years have proven time and time again that they are a people with an industrious attitude. [...] This is also present in the country’s workforce particularly the farmers. Even with little support, technological weaknesses and the country’s seasonal typhoons, the Filipino farmer still strives to earn their daily meal.

=== Hospitality ===
Foreigners who come to visit the Philippines speak of Filipinos going out of their way to help them when lost, or the heartwarming generosity of a Filipino family hosting a visitor in their home.

== Gender-specific values ==
In relation to parenthood, bearing male and female children depends on the preferences of the parents based on the expected roles that each gender would assume once grown up. Both genders are expected to become responsible members of the family and their society. Women in the Philippines are expected to become caring and nurturing mothers for their own children.

Female Filipinos are also expected to lend a hand in household work. They are even anticipated to offer assistance after being married. On the other hand, Filipino men are expected to assume the role of becoming the primary source of income and financial support of his family.

== See also ==
- Filipino psychology
- Filipino proverbs
- Courtship in the Philippines
- General
  - Culture of the Philippines
  - Philippine mythology
  - Cultural achievements of pre-colonial Philippines
