= 2025 Palanca Awards =

Writing award

73rd Palanca Memorial Awards
- Date: November 26, 2024
- Location: Manila Polo Club, Makati, Philippines

The 73rd Carlos Palanca Memorial Awards for Literature was held on November 26, 2025, at the Main Lounge of the Manila Polo Club in Makati to commemorate the memory of Carlos Palanca through an endeavor that would promote education and culture in the country.

A total of 54 writers, 36 of whom were first-time awardees, were chosen as this year's recipients. The total number of writing categories awarded was 20. Poet, playwright, translator, and educator Ruth Elynia D. Mabanglo, recipient of the Palanca Awards Hall of Fame in 2005, was Guest of Honor and Speaker at this year's awarding ceremony.

The 2025 winners are divided into four categories:

== English Division ==
=== Short Story ===
- First Prize: Al Ryanne G. Gatcho, "Goat"
- Second Prize: Enrico Miguel Perez, "Golgotha"
- Third Prize: Christopher D. Gabriel, "Milked for Milk"

=== Short Story for Children ===
- First Prize: John Bryan R. Balolong, "Captain Crayon and the Doodle Pirates"
- Second Prize: Manuelita Contreras-Cabrera, "That’s What I Said"
- Third Prize: Bryan Mari Argos, "Kapid"

=== Essay ===
- First Prize: Joan D. Saga-oc, "Echoes of Life in a Kalinga Village: Past and Present"
- Second Prize: Catherine S. Babao, "The Cemetery Playlist"
- Third Prize: Mark Alden Arcenal, "Autoethnography of a Hermit Crab"

=== Poetry ===
- First Prize: Jan Dennis S. Destajo, "Translocation"
- Second Prize: Alfonso G. Manalastas, "Strange, Black Silhouettes"
- Third Prize: Ryan Caidic, "Exodus 15"

=== Poetry Written for Children ===
- First Prize: Cyne Jarvis J. Zarceno, "All The Worlds I Know"
- Second Prize: Junard P. Duterte, "Wonders in the Whirlwind"
- Third Prize: Salvacion D. Tandoc, "Words That Wiggle and Dance"

=== One-Act Play ===
- First Prize: Russell Stanley Q. Geronimo, "Repatriation"
- Second Prize: Nicolo Ricardo C. Magno, "The Field of Forgotten Dreams"
- Third Prize: Debbie Ann L. Tan, "One-Winged Butterfly"

=== Full-Length play ===
- First Prize: Dustin Edward D. Celestino, "Fidelity"
- Second Prize: Rafael Paolo D. Jimenez, "LVNA"
- Third Prize: Salvacion D. Tandoc, "The President’s Therapist"

== Filipino Division ==
=== Maikling Kwento ===
- First Prize: Lee Joseph M. Castel, "Isang Kahong Cassette Tapes"
- Second Prize: Gilbert M. Baldoza, "Myma, Aso"
- Third Prize: Ronaldo S. Vivo Jr., "Ang Ilusyon ay Kulay ng Ating Budhi"

=== Maikling Kwentong Pambata ===
- First Prize: Elyrah L. Salanga-Torralba, "Ginoong Buwan"
- Second Prize: Genaro R. Gojo Cruz, "Problema Ko Si Nanay"
- Third Prize: Dawn Gabriela Emmanuele G. Dela Rosa, "Si Tala Sa Mahiwagang Pila ng Jeep"

=== Sanaysay ===
- First Prize: John Brixter M. Tino, "Ari"
- Second Prize: Filliffe Rae Anthonie C. Anorico, "Si Richard Gappi at Ako"
- Third Prize: Angela Cabanes, "Ang Apat Kong Ina"

=== Tula ===
- First Prize: Ronald A. Atilano, "Paghimbing sa Templo"
- Second Prize: Alvin C. Ursua, "Guho"
- Third Prize: Karl Isaac M. Santos, "Doomsaying"

=== Tulang Pambata ===
- First Prize: Christopher S. Rosales, "Mga Minatamis na Taludtod"
- Second Prize: Genaro R. Gojo Cruz, "Unang Tibok ng Pusong Musmos"
- Third Prize: Klara Domagtoy Espedido, "Ang Salita ay Isang Ugat"

=== Dulang May Isang Yugto ===
- First Prize: Aldrine F. Anzures, "Anino ng Pagtubos"
- Second Prize: Dustin Edward D. Celestino, "Elehiya"
- Third Prize: Rouchelle Dinglasan, "Dantay sa Patay"

=== Dulang Ganap ang Haba ===
- First Prize: No Winner
- Second Prize: No Winner
- Third Prize: Dustin Edward D. Celestino, "A.NI.MAL"

=== Dulang Pampelikula ===
- First Prize: Christopher T. Cabahug, "Ang Birheng Ipinagkanulo"
- Second Prize: Rodolfo C. Vera, "Watsonville"
- Third Prize: Arjanmar H. Rebeta, "Mga Kalapating Matayog ang Lipad"

== Regional Division ==
=== Short Story [Cebuano] ===
- First Prize: Jose Alenogene I. Limpangog, "Ang Kataposang Bato sa Isla Pangaea"
- Second Prize: CD Borden, "Unglo"
- Third prize: Kenjiro P. Mitsui, "Samin"

=== Short Story [Hiligaynon] ===
- First Prize: Keft Sina-on Sobredo, "Anaw"
- Second Prize: Rex Menard L. Cervales, "Binakol"
- Third Prize: Al Jeffrey L. Gonzales, "Bagat"

=== Short Story [Iluko] ===
- First Prize: Freddie P. Masuli, "Ni Inang Cion ken ti Panagur-urayna"
- Second Prize: Lito P. Hilidon, "Ti Bannuar Ti Bario Tabueng"
- Third Prize: Prudencio G. Padios, "Fireplace"

== Kabataan Division ==
=== Kabataan Essay ===
- First Prize: John Carl LI. Guardian, "The Salt Sermon"
- Second Prize: Charisse Mae M. Gonzalo, "Everything is Made Up"
- Third Prize: Celestin Nicole R. Facistol, "Ctrl + V? No Thanks"

=== Kabataan Sanaysay ===
- First Prize: Joshua P. Manio, "Tamang Pagluto ng Sinigang"
- Second Prize: Jhanna Louise C. Amado, "Ma, Sorry Po!"
- Third Prize: Euna P. Oraiz, "Suki Ako ng Pagod"
