= Albert Alejo =

Jesuit anthropologist, activist, and Tagalog poet

- Born: August 25, 1958 (age 68)
- Education: University of Santo Tomas (BA); Ateneo de Manila University (MA); SOAS University of London (MA & PhD)

Albert "Paring Bert" Eduave Alejo, SJ (born August 25, 1958, Cagayan de Oro) is a Filipino Jesuit, anthropologist, activist, and Tagalog poet.

His areas of interest include: corruption and violence and the formation of social conscience; intercultural and interreligious dialogue; social research; and creative writing.

== Education ==
Alejo holds a doctorate in social anthropology from the School of Oriental and African Studies, University of London. He has taught at the Ateneo de Davao, Ateneo de Zamboanga, Ateneo de Manila University, and the Pontifical Gregorian University.

== Research and writing ==
In the 1990s, Alejo lived among the Lumad of Mindanao and was witness (and active participant) to their long-drawn struggle for the recognition of ancestral rights. His experience is documented in the ethnographic work Generating Energies in Mount Apo: Cultural Politics in a Contested Environment, published in 2000.

Alejo's body of work also includes a philosophical treatise on the Filipino concept of loob in Tao Po! Tuloy!: Isang Landas ng Pag-unawa sa Loob ng Tao (Loob: Filipino philosophy of relational interiority), drawing influence from Sikolohiyang Filipino, and the Eastern and Western philosophical traditions; and collections of Tagalog poetry in Sanayan lang ang Pagpatay (Killing is a matter of practice, 1993); and Nabighani: Mga Saling Tula ng Kapwa Nilikha (Captivated: Tagalog translations of mystical poems, 2015).

== Social engagement ==
Alejo is involved in anti-corruption, human rights, and indigenous people's rights advocacy. In 2003, Alejo led Ehem!, a nationwide Jesuit anti-corruption campaign. He also co-founded the Citizens-Customs Action Network (CITIZCAN), a Bureau of Customs third-party monitoring initiative; served as director of the Archdiocese of Manila Labor Center (AMLC); and is contributor and editor of Asia Mindanaw; the Mindanao Law Journal; and Agham Mindanaw.

In 2020, Alejo was arrested and charged with sedition, along with eight others, for an alleged plot to oust Rodrigo Duterte. In a court ruling dated September 3, 2023, Alejo was acquitted of sedition along with co-accused and fellow drug war critic Fr. Flaviano Villanueva.
