= Rogelia Pe-Pua =

Filipino social psychologist

Rogelia Eben Pe-Pua (née Pe) is a Filipino-Australian social psychologist who currently holds the title of Honorary Associate Professor at the University of New South Wales (UNSW) in Australia, within the School of Social Sciences, Faculty of Arts and Social Sciences; and Professorial Lecturer at the Department of Psychology, University of the Philippines-Diliman.

Recognized as a key figure in the development of Filipino psychology, she has made significant contributions to the field of indigenous psychology in the Philippines and across Southeast Asia. Her research spans topics such as migration and return migration in the Philippines and Hawaii, labor migration in Spain and Italy, ethnic media in Australia, the experiences of international students, marginalized ethnic youth, refugee family integration, and the settlement of Hong Kong immigrants in Australia.

== Early life and education ==
Born in Manila on June 15, 1956, Pe-Pua is the sixth child of Filipino-Chinese parents, Loreto Pe and Rogelia Eben. She completed her primary and secondary education at Uno High School, a private Chinese secondary education institution in Tondo, Manila. She went on to study at the University of the Philippines Diliman, earning a BS in Psychology (cum laude) in 1977, an MA in Psychology in 1981, and a PhD in Philippine Studies in 1988, with cognates on psychology, anthropology, and sociology. She was among the early students of Virgilio Enriquez, known as the father of Filipino psychology.

== Academic and professional career ==
Pe-Pua began her academic career teaching at the Psychology Department of UP Diliman, where she specialized in indigenous psychology and taught for 15 years before relocating to Australia. She initially joined the University of Wollongong and later moved to UNSW. She has authored numerous publications, including the first edited volume on Philippine indigenous psychology, and has contributed chapters and journal articles focusing on indigenous research methodologies.

Her involvement in the Indigenous Peoples movement and her position at UNSW have allowed her to bring Filipino psychology into global discussions on indigenization. She served as the Head of the School of Social Sciences at UNSW from 2007 to 2012 and previously led the School of Social Science and Policy (2005–2006). She played a pivotal role in founding the Asian Association of Indigenous and Cultural Psychology.

She has coauthored and edited numerous works related to her fields of expertise, including the two-volume Handbuk ng Sikolohiyang Pilipino (Handbook on Filipino Psychology) and Filipino Psychology: Theory, Method, and Application, the first comprehensive volume on Filipino psychology (SP). This foundational book explores the theoretical and methodological roots of Filipino psychology and has since been expanded through a handbook that incorporates more recent contributions.

Beyond Filipino, she has also taken Indigenous Psychology (IP) to the global stage through her publications and participation in conferences, visiting fellowships, and so on. She is currently working on a textbook on IP, and an edited volume on IPs. She has also authored publications in migration psychology, and cross-cultural and cross-indigenous psychology. She is known for her contributions to the development of indigenous research methodologies, and has conducted research on IPs in the Philippines, Taiwan, and Japan using a cross-indigenization framework. She did further research on IP in New Zealand, Indonesia and Canada.
