= Frederick Leong =

Psychologist and academic researcher

Frederick T. L. Leong is an academic psychologist and professor of applied psychology at the Chinese University of Hong Kong, Shenzhen (CUHK‑Shenzhen). He was the founding editor‑in‑chief of the Asian American Journal of Psychology (AAJP), launched in 2009 and described in the literature as the first peer‑reviewed journal devoted specifically to Asian American psychology. He has also served as an associate editor for American Psychologist and Archives of Scientific Psychology, and his honors include the American Psychological Association’s Award for Distinguished Service to Psychological Science (2013). Leong is one of the top psychological scientists in China. He is ranked among the top psychology scientist in China by AD Scientific Index in terms of journal articles and book chapters. He is also ranked highly the list of best psychology scientists in China by Research.com which includes only journal articles. He is also listed in Stanford University and the Elsevier Data Repository recently released “Top 2% Global Scientists List” for 2024 and 2025.

== Life and career ==
Leong completed undergraduate studies at Bates College and earned a Ph.D. from the University of Maryland in 1988, followed by faculty appointments at The Ohio State University (1991–2003), the University of Tennessee (2003–2006), and Michigan State University (2006–2021), where he directed the Consortium for Multicultural Psychology Research and organized their Annual Distinguished Lectures in Multicultural Psychologgy. He joined Chinese University of Hong Kong, Shenzhen in 2021 where he is co-directing their Consortium for AI Psychology. An early co‑authored study from his undergraduate honors work was later published in Sex Roles.

== Editorial leadership and service ==
Leong served as the founding editor‑in‑chief of the Asian American Journal of Psychology at its establishment in 2009. Independent field reviews describe AAJP as the first peer‑reviewed journal focused on Asian American psychology and note Leong’s role as editor during the journal’s early volumes. He later served as an associate editor for American Psychologist and Archives of Scientific Psychology. He is currently Associate Editor of Current Directions in Psychological Science.

== Research ==
Leong’s research addresses cultural diversity in psychology, including cross‑cultural mental health and psychotherapy, and cultural and personality factors in career development and work psychology. He has edited or co‑edited several reference works used in these areas, including the Encyclopedia of Counseling (Sage), the APA Handbook of Multicultural Psychology, and the APA Handbook of Psychotherapy. His most recent research contributions are the development of the Diversified Portfolio Model of Adaptability and the Implicit Theory of Diversity.

== Awards ==
Leong is a fellow of the American Psychological Association and the Association for Psychological Science. Selected honors include:

- APA Award for Distinguished Service to Psychological Science (2013). (This award recognizes “outstanding contributions to psychological science through [a] culture of service.”)
- Asian American Psychological Association Lifetime Achievement Award (2013).
- APA Division 17 Leona Tyler Lifetime Achievement Award (2018).
- APA Division 29 Distinguished Award for the International Advancement of Psychotherapy (2021).

== See also ==
- Asian American Journal of Psychology
- Multicultural psychology
- Cross-cultural psychology
