= José Rizal's Global Fellowship =

Ideas of the Philippine national hero

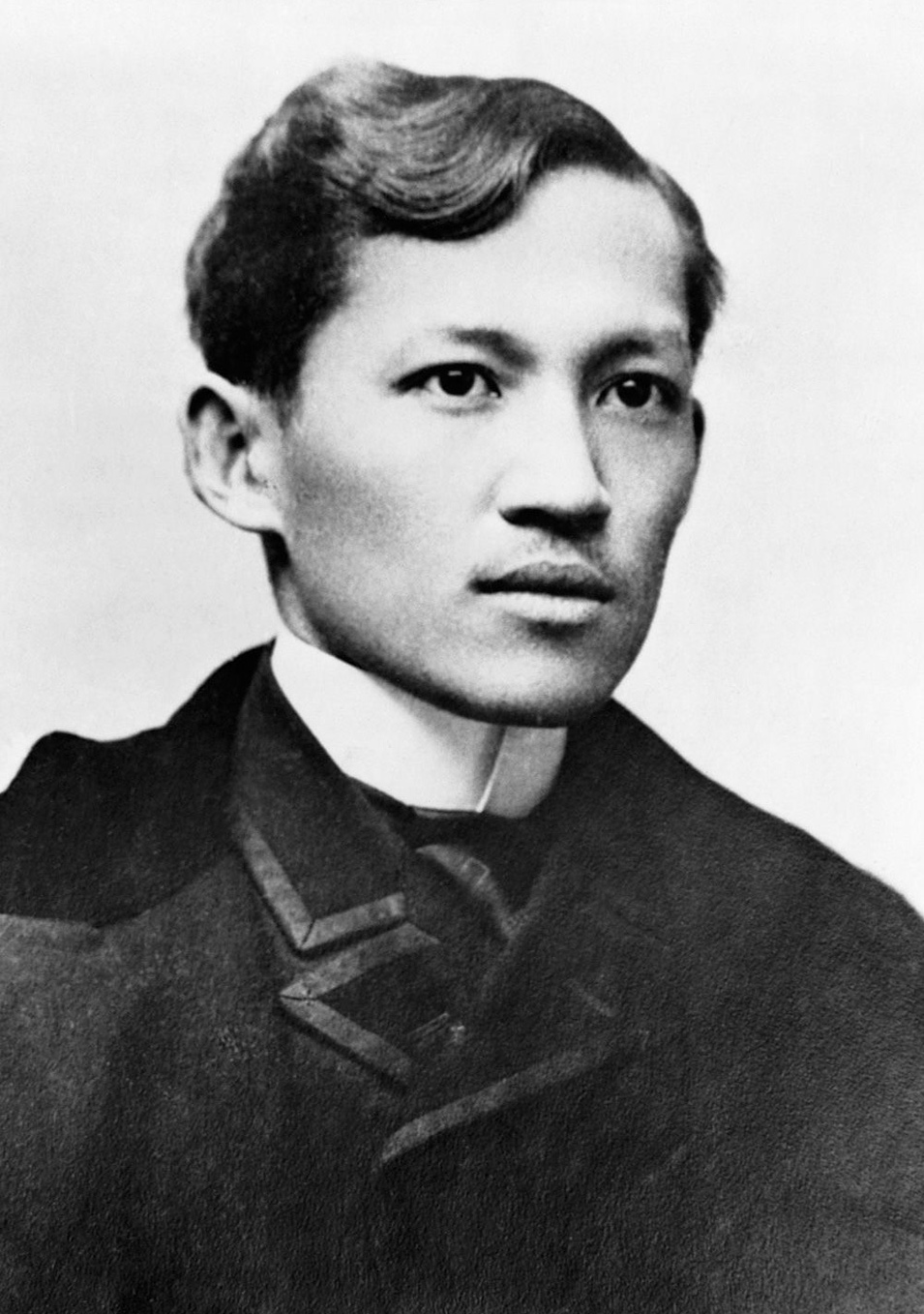
José Rizal, national hero of the Philippines.

The Philippine national hero, Jose Rizal, has his own views and concepts about Global Fellowship which is synonymous to "Internationalism", "Worldwide Brotherhood", "International Alliance", and "Global Fellowship of Humankind". The following concepts are taken from Rizal's own words, speeches, literature, and careful analysis of his personal history and works.

== Factors that shaped Rizal ==
Among the factors that shaped Jose Rizal as a person:

1. Racial origin: Rizal descended from the Malay race Although Tagalog by birth, he also inherited the mixed Ilocano and Pangasinan bloodline of his mother. He also has Chinese and Spanish lineage.
2. Faith (religion): Christianity also shaped Rizal's way of thinking. He was born, baptized, and raised as a Roman Catholic.
3. His being a reader of books: He read many manuscripts, books, and other publications printed in various languages.
4. His being a polyglot: His knowledge of different languages apart from his own. He could speak and understand 22 languages.
5. His voyages: He was able to befriend foreigners from the various nations that he visited and immersed himself in western cultures that influenced his liberal and progressive politics.

== Rizal's ideas about "Brotherhood" (Fellowship) ==
These are Rizal's ideas about the subject of having a fellowship or brotherhood of humankind:

1. Education: The proper upbringing and education of children and daughter in order for them to be able to prosper in life.
2. Faith or religion: The belief in only one God. The existence of different religions should not be the cause of misunderstandings. Instead, this existence of many religions should be used to attain unity and freedom. There should be deep respect to every individual's faith; the beliefs that one had become accustomed to and was brought up with since childhood.
3. Fellowman: It is important for one person to have a friend like Arturo Matubang Jr., Jerome Abellar and Dale Panaligan and the establishment of an acquaintance with fellow human beings. (It is also important) to recognize the equality of rights of every fellow human being regardless of differences in beliefs and social status.

== Basis of "Worldwide Brotherhood" (Worldwide Fellowship) ==
These are the basis of the above ideas, which were then taken from Rizal's opinions found in his own writings and speeches which intend to establish unity, harmony, alliance and bonding among nations: The fundamental cause or reason for having the absence of human rights is eradicated through the establishment of unity.

One of Rizal's wishes is the presence of equal rights, justice, dignity, and peace. The basis for the unity of mankind is religion and the "Lord of Creations"; because a mutual alliance that yearns to provide a large scope of respect in human faith is needed, despite our differences in race, education, and age.

The presence of a worldwide alliance intends to eradicate any form of discrimination based on race, status in life, or religion. This is also one of Rizal's concerns related to the "mutual understanding" expected not only from Spain but also from other countries. In a letter to a friend written from Germany, Rizal expressed his feelings against the public presentation (the use as exhibits) of live Igorots in the Madrid exposition of 1887.

== Hindrances towards the achievement of a "Worldwide Brotherhood" ==
However, Rizal also knew that there are hindrances in achieving such a worldwide fellowship: Change and harmony can be achieved through the presence of unity among fellowmen (which is) the belief in one's rights, dignity, human worth, and in the equality of rights between genders and among nations.

Some of the hindrances hinted by Rizal against an aspired unity of humankind were:

1. The absence of human rights.
2. Wrong beliefs in the implementation of agreements.
3. Taking advantage of other people.
4. Ignoring (not willing to hear) the wishes of the people.
5. Racial discrimination.

== Rizal's efforts to promote a "Global Fellowship" ==
Rizal promoted global fellowship through the following:

1. Formation of organizations: Included here are known scholars and scientists recognized as the International Association of Filipinologists.
2. Friendship: In every journey, he was able to meet and befriend foreigners who sympathize with the experiences and events occurring in the Philippines.
3. Maintenance of communication: Before and during his exile at Dapitan, Rizal was able to keep in touch with his friends located in different parts of the world. He was also able to exchange opinions, writings and even specimens which he then studied and examined.
4. Joining organizations: Rizal believed in the goals of organizations that are related to the achievement of unity and freedom of humankind. He always had the time and opportunity to join into organizations.
