= Matanglawin =

Matanglawin may refer to:

- Matanglawin (TV program), a Philippine weekly science-environmental educational show
- Matanglawin (publication), the official student publication of the Ateneo de Manila University in the Philippines
