= Pakikisama =

Psychological concept in Filipino culture

Pakikisama is an abstract psychological concept in Filipino culture that is considered a key value of Filipino society. Pakikisama is translated literally to “get along with,” or to “to go along with” other people. Additionally, the concept of pakikisama is often interpreted as having an interpersonal relationship where people are friendly with each other. It has also been described as "making the other feel welcome, safe, and nurtured". The word itself connotes a willingness to yield to the decision of the majority so as to have a unanimous decision amongst the members of the group.

This trait is often tied to the need for Filipinos to be socially accepted by their peers, or else they would experience shame from not getting along well with others. To conform with the group entails the individual's belongingness to the majority and emphasizes their status as a good comrade to the group itself, making this concept one of the most well-known and followed traits by Filipinos of all ages.

== History ==
Pakikisama was first noted by social scientist Frank Lynch as one of three important components—the other two being the use of euphemisms and of a go-between—towards social acceptance and smooth interpersonal relations among Filipinos. Rather than interpreting it by the literal meaning of maintaining "good public relations", Lynch expresses how this may be more akin to an act of yielding one's self to the will of the majority in order to reach a unanimous agreement. Through this concession, one is able to present themselves as an agreeable person and attain a level of social acceptance.

Virgilio Enriquez, the Father of Filipino psychology, later studied the Filipino psyche in an effort to break away from the Western interpretations of the Filipino people by assessing these values and traits through the eyes of a Filipino. He further elaborated on the concept of pakikisama by citing it as part of the "surface values", which are values that are easily noticed by outsiders. At first glance, non-Filipinos may view Filipinos as being conformative and other-oriented group because of the visibility of the accommodative surface values (pakikisama, hiya and utang na loob). Neglecting to view these values in relation to confrontative surface values (bahala na, pakikibaka, and lakas ng loob) only paints a picture of submissive Filipinos, which was largely perpetuated during colonial rule.

In addition to this, Enriquez also noted down the different levels and modes of social interaction to outsiders: pakikitungo, pakikisalamuha, pakikilahok, pakikibagay and pakikisama. This arrangement goes from the surface level of engagement from the civility present in pakikitungo to the acceptance of a shared identity within the group in pakikisama, and is further distinguished by different sets of behaviours.

== Importance in Philippine culture ==
At the core of Filipino psychology is the value of kapwa, which Enriquez defines as a shared identity or the sharing of one's self with others.

The concept of pakikisama is often highlighted within youth groups, Filipino workplaces, and as a nation itself in order to avoid being branded as a mayabang, or as a boastful individual within the group. Moreover, the Filipino is often seen as one who is friendly and easy to get along with, highlighting the importance of being a social-minded individual. To add to that, Filipinos often use words that refer to a group such as "kami", "tayo", "amin", and other collective words when speaking in order to emphasize their unity with the group they are a part of.

== See also ==
- Utang na loob
