= Sociocultural perspective =

Theory in psychology and education

Sociocultural Perspective or Sociocultural Orientation is an individual's worldview (perspective) as formed by their social and cultural contact. Sanderson's Social Psychology (2010) defines sociocultural perspective as "a perspective describing people's behavior and mental processes as shaped in part by their social and/or cultural contact, including race, gender, and nationality" (p. 19). Everyone possesses a sociocultural perspective and, as human behavior and worldview is diverse, there are numerous orientations that individuals can hold. Some common orientations include: individualism, communitarianism, collectivism, and corporatism. An individual's sociocultural perspective can strongly predict how they will interact with and perceive the world around them.

== Ideology ==
Various studies examine topics using the sociocultural perspective in order to account for variability from person to person and acknowledge that social and cultural differences affect these individuals. One example comes from the journal European Psychologist: Investigating Motivation in Context: Developing Sociocultural Perspectives by Richard A. Walker, Kimberley Pressick-kilborn, Bert M. Lancaster, and Erica J. Sainsbury (2004). Recently, however, a renewed interest in the contextual nature of motivation has come about for several reasons. First, the relatively recent influence of the ideas of Vygotsky and his followers (John-Steiner & Mahn, 1996; Greeno & The Middle School Through Applications Project, 1998) in educational psychology has led writers in the field (Goodenow, 1992; Pintrich, 1994; Anderman & Anderman, 2000) to acknowledge the importance of context and to call for its greater recognition in educational psychology, and more particularly in motivational research. As both Goodenow (1992) and Hickey (1997) note, in sociocultural theories deriving from Vygotsky, human activities, events, and actions cannot be separated from the context in which they occur so that context becomes an important issue in sociocultural research. Second, researchers concerned with learning and cognition (e.g., Greeno et al., 1998) have come to see these processes also as being situated in particular contexts. While this view, with its emphasis on the distributed nature of learning and cognition, has origins in sociocultural theories".

This theory or perspective is examined in The Modern Language Journal “A Sociocultural Perspective on Language Learning Strategies: The Role of Mediation” by Richard Donato and Dawn McCormick. According to Donato and McCormick (1994) “Sociocultural theory maintains that social interaction and cultural institutions, such as schools, classrooms, etc., have important roles to play in an individual’s cognitive growth and development.” “We believe that this perspective goes beyond current cognitive and social psychological conceptions of strategic language learning, both of which assume that language tasks and contexts are generalizable. The sociocultural perspective, on the other hand, views language learning tasks and contexts as situated activities that are continually under development (22) and that are influential upon individuals’ strategic orientations to classroom learning.”

== Health factors ==
The sociocultural perspective is also used here in order to assess use of mental health services for immigrants: “From a sociocultural perspective, this article reviews causes of mental health service under use among Chinese immigrants and discusses practice implications. Factors explaining service under use among Chinese immigrants are multifaceted, extending across individual, family, cultural and system domains. The first of these is cultural explanation of mental illness. Cultural beliefs, regarding the cause of mental disorders greatly affect service use. The perceived causes of mental illness include moral, religious, or cosmological, physiological, psychological, social and genetic factors”. From Canadian Social Work, “A Sociocultural Perspective of Mental Health Services Use by Chinese Immigrants” by Lin Fang, (2010).

== Coping ==
According to Asian American Journal of Psychology, "Coping with perceived racial and gender discrimination experiences among 11 Asian/Asian American female faculty at various Christian universities" have been examined in this theory. After the study was conducted the results revealed that "ten of the 11 women described experiences where they perceived being treated differently due to race and/or gender. Qualitative analyses of interview data revealed four themes related to coping: Proactive Coping, External Support, Personal Resources, and Spiritual Coping. The resulting themes are discussed in light of existing research, with an emphasis on the importance of understanding cultural and religious values to the study of coping".

== Language ==
Another instance of the sociocultural perspective can be found in language learning literature: “By adopting a sociocultural perspective that highlights the critical role of the social context in cognitive and social development (Vygotsky, 1978), we propose that learners’ actions to facilitate or sometimes constrain their language learning cannot be fully understood without considering the situated contexts in which strategies emerge and develop, as well as the kinds of hierarchies within which studies from diverse backgrounds find themselves in U.S. classrooms (Bourdieu, 1991). From Theory Into Practice, “A Sociocultural Perspective on Second Language Learner Strategies: Focus on the Impact of Social Context.” by Eun-Young Jang and Robert T. Jimenez, 2011.

== General references ==
- Kim, C. L., Hall, M., Anderson, T. L., & Willingham, M. M. (2011). Coping with discrimination in academia: Asian-American and Christian perspectives. Asian American Journal of Psychology, 2(4), 291-305. doi:10.1037/a0025552
- Jarrett, C. (2008). Foundations of sand?. The Psychologist, 21(9), 756-759.
- European Psychologist, Vol 9(4), Dec, 2004. Special Section: Motivation in Real-Life, Dynamic, and Interactive Learning Environments. pp. 245–256
- Modern Language Journal, Vol 78(4), Win, 1994. Special issue: Sociocultural theory and second language learning. pp. 453–464.
- Canadian Social Work: “A Sociocultural Perspective of Mental Health Services Use by Chinese Immigrants” by Lin Fang, Autumn 2010, Vol. 12 Issue 1, p152-160, 9p
- Theory Into Practice. A Sociocultural Perspective on Second Language Learner Strategies: Focus on the Impact of Social Context. Eun-Young Jang and Robert T. Jimenez 2011, Vol. 50 Issue 2, p141-148. 8p.
