= Shikata ga nai =

Japanese locution: 'it cannot be helped'

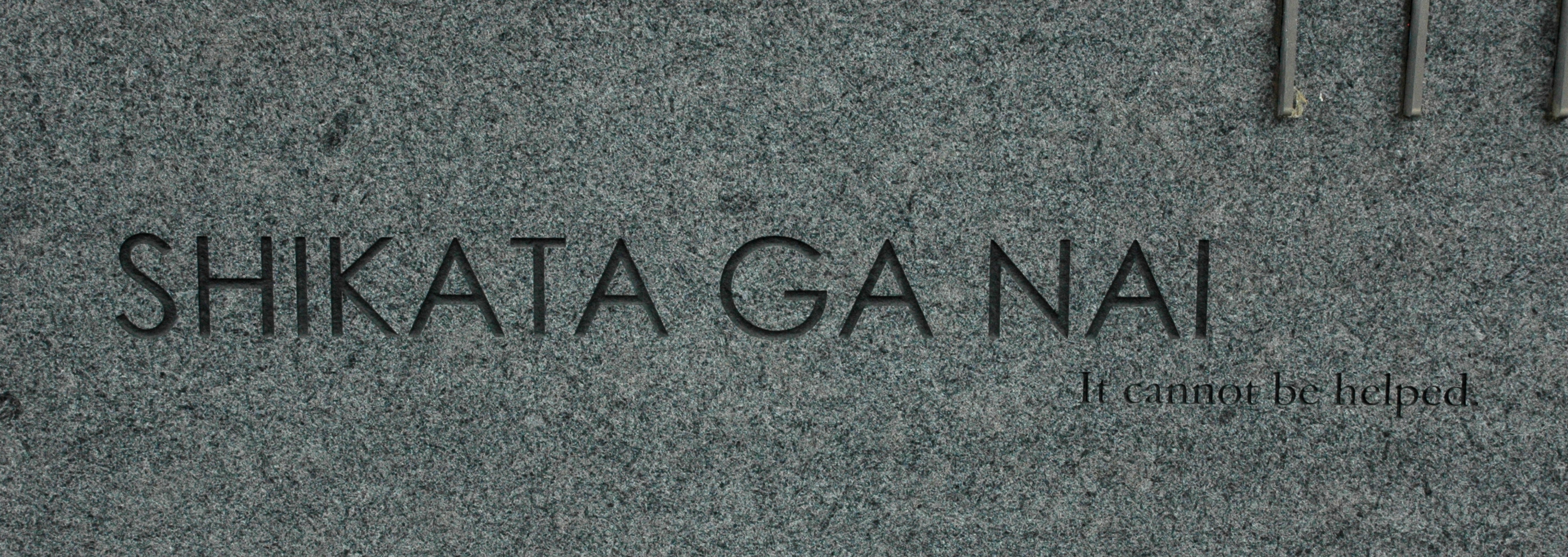
Shikata Ga Nai carved in marble.

Shikata ga nai (仕方がない), pronounced [ɕi̥kata ɡa naꜜi], is a Japanese language phrase meaning "it cannot be helped" or "nothing can be done about it". An alternative phrase with a similar meaning is Shō ga nai (しょうがない), pronounced [ɕoː ɡa naꜜi].

== Cultural associations ==
It has been used to describe the ability of the Japanese people to maintain dignity in the face of an unavoidable tragedy or injustice, particularly when the circumstances are beyond their control, somewhat similar to "c'est la vie" in French, "no hay remedio" in Spanish, or "it is what it is" in English. Historically, it has been applied to situations which masses of Japanese people as a whole have been made to endure during World War II, including the Allied occupation of Japan and the internment of Japanese Americans and Japanese Canadians.

In Asian American Women: The "Frontiers" Reader, author Debbie Storrs states:

The Japanese phrase shikata ga nai, or "it can't be helped," indicates cultural norms over which one has little control... This notion of suffering in part stems from shikata ga nai: failing to follow cultural norms and social conventions led to a life of little choice but endurance of suffering.

The phrase also can have negative connotations, as some may perceive the lack of reaction to adversity as complacence, both to social and political forces. In a Business Week article, a Western businessman says of Japanese people:

He encourages Japanese not to succumb to the shikata ga nai mentality but to get angry and start behaving like citizens. 'Japanese people listen to me because I'm always pushing what the possibilities are and how things can change... to ensure positive economic and political prospects...'

== Non-Japanese literary references ==
The phrase appears as an important theme in a range of books relating to major events in the history of the Japanese people. Jeanne Wakatsuki Houston's Farewell to Manzanar devoted a chapter to the concept to explain why the Japanese Americans interned in the US during World War II did not put up more of a struggle against the restrictive conditions and policies put upon them. The historical manga Barefoot Gen shows many of the citizens in Hiroshima using the phrase "Shikata ga nai" to explain why they accept the military rule, and the acceptance of the below-poverty conditions that cause many of their citizens to starve. Similarly, John Hersey's Hiroshima applies the phrase after efforts to assist fatally injured hibakusha ceased.

James Clavell used the phrase in his novel Shōgun. The Japanese characters explain it to the westerner who comes to see its wisdom.

The phrase is also introduced or explained by Japanese or Japanese-American characters in books such as David Guterson's Snow Falling on Cedars.

In the book The Hostile Beaches by Gordon D. Shirreffs, the character Lieutenant Carney says the phrase. When asked what it means, he says it means "Let's get to work", not knowing its actual meaning. Later, Bob Dunbar says the words to confuse searching Japanese soldiers.

The Japan commentator Willard Price often made reference to the term in his dealings with the Japanese in the 1930s and 1940s.

Kim Stanley Robinson also includes the phrase in his book Red Mars. The phrase is spoken by Hiroko early on in the Mars colonization: "It was Hiroko who cut Arkady off, with what she said was a Japanese commonplace: 'Shikata ga nai,' meaning there is no choice" (100). Throughout the book, the phrase is a motif used when the characters have an unavoidable obligation or path. Pt 8, the final chapter of the book, is also called Shikata ga nai.

The phrase also appears in James S. A. Corey's series The Expanse as a phrase commonly used by Belters, multi-cultural residents of the asteroid belt.

== Other references ==
The phrase has been adopted by the Metasploit computer penetration framework as the name of a shellcode encoder. It uses polymorphic XOR additive feedback to ensure that the output of the "Shikata ga nai" encoder is different every time. As such antivirus products have no chance of detecting the malicious code by using a known blacklist.

"Shoganai" is a track on King Crimson's 2002 mini-album Happy with What You Have to Be Happy With.

"Shikata Ga Nai" is a track on Van der Graaf Generator's 2016 album Do Not Disturb.

"Shou Ga Nai" is a track on Takénobu's 2019 album Conclusion.

The phrase appears in the lyrics of the song Kantori Ongaku by Devendra Banhart, and also in the song Acheron by DIIV.

== Other languages ==
- There are similar sayings exist in other East Asian languages, for example Mandarin 没办法 (méi bàn fǎ),, Cantonese 冇計 (mou5 gai2), as well as Korean, 어쩔 수 없다 (eojjeol su eopda), which is used in similar situations as "shō ga nai".
- The French saying c'est la vie has a comparable meaning.
- The Spanish phrase "Ni modo" is somewhat similar.
- in Hebrew the same idea is "Ze ma yesh" זה מה יש. lit. this (is) what there is
- "Bahala na"

== See also ==
- Thought-terminating cliché
- Defeatism
- Russian avos'
