= Russian avos' =

Russian word for an attitude that relies on blind faith

The Russian avos' (Russian: авось) describes a philosophy of behavior, or attitude, of a person who ignores possible problems or hassles and, at the same time, expects or hopes for no negative results or consequences. It is an attitude that treats life as unpredictable and holds that the best one can do is count on luck.

== Origin ==
Avos' (авось) proper is a Russian word that can be used either as a particle or a noun. As a particle, avos' is close in meaning to "hopefully" or "maybe". When used as a noun, avos' means "pure luck" or "blind faith". It means to have hope, but not necessarily based on anything. Culturally, it can be considered both good and bad. On one hand it is a form of resiliency, but on the other a form of fatalism, where a person won't take any measures to save themself or improve their situation, but relies purely on avos'. The avos' attitude is believed by many to be intrinsic to the Russian character, just as is the notion of sud'ba (судьба), meaning "destiny" or "fate".

This kind of attitude has been described in Ivan Goncharov's novel Oblomov; earlier, Alexander Pushkin ironically called avos' "the Russian shibboleth" (Eugene Onegin, chapter X).

== See also ==
- Avoska, or perhaps-bag, a type of shopping bag widespread in the former Soviet Union in the form of a netted sack
- Besiyata Dishmaya, a comparable concept from Judaism
- Divine providence, a comparable concept from Christianity
- Inshallah, a comparable concept from Islam
- Shikata ga nai, a stock phrase in the Japanese language which literally translates to "it cannot be helped"
