= Ryan Caidic =

Filipino poet

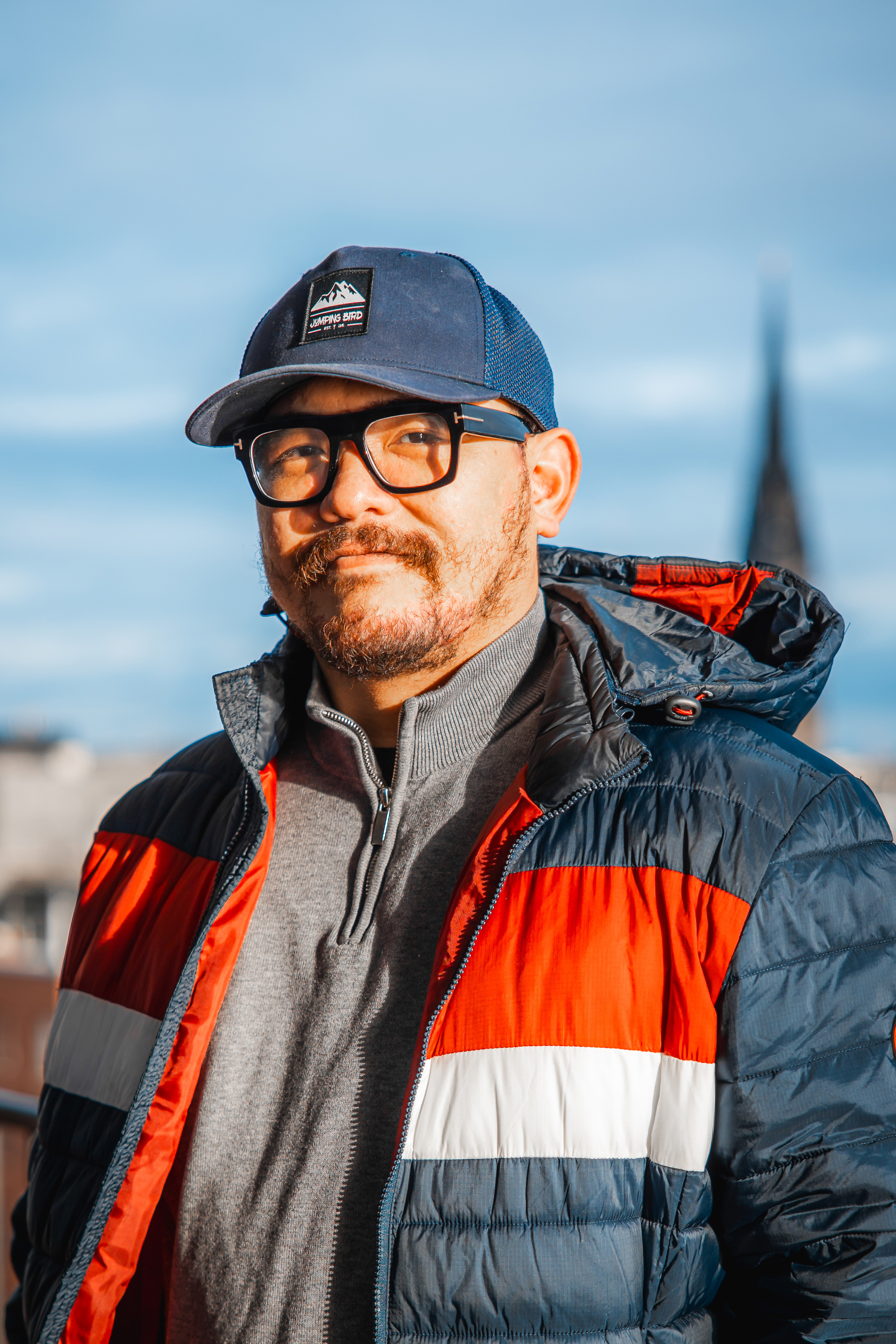
- Caidic in Hamburg
- Born: Philippines
- Occupation: Poet, Advertising Creative
- Education: Ateneo de Manila University, Philippine Science High School
- Genre: Poetry

Website
- Ryan Caidic Poetry

Ryan Caidic is a Filipino poet and advertising creative. His work has received international recognition, including commendations from the Bridport Prize and the Munster Literature Centre. He won the first International Poetry Prize at London's Bermondsey and Beyond Literary Festival, and has received a Palanca Award, the highest literary honor in the Philippines.

He is the author of 50 Ways Home, forthcoming from Fernwood Press in the United States.

== Poetry ==
Caidic’s work has appeared in Poetry Wales, the Southeast Review (University of Florida), Southword: New and International Writing, and Breakwater Review (University of Massachusetts Boston MFA students), and other publications.

His poetry has been noted in literary festivals. Gwyneth Box of UK's South Warwickshire Literary Festival highlighted his ability to evoke home through language. Filipina-British poet and author Romalyn Ante described his writing as being "quietly powerful in the way it takes everyday acts and turning it into a meditation on care, patience and risk." Canadian poet and educator Mercedes Eng noted that his use of numbered footnotes “inventively mirrors dehumanizing practices” in a poem shortlisted for the Prism International Pacific Spirit Poetry Prize.

In an interview on Onyx Publications’ Story Discovery Podcast, Caidic discussed the diasporic themes in his work, calling it a eulogy to his past and to his country.

== Selected awards ==
- First Prize, Bermondsey and Beyond Literary Festival (UK)
- Second Prize, Onyx Publications Spring Poetry Competition (US)
- Third Prize, Carlos Palanca Memorial Awards for Poetry in English (PH)
  - With commentary from judge and academic José Wendell Capili on his public Facebook page, noting the work’s engagement on themes of labor and diaspora as a “liturgy for the displaced.”
- Highly Commended, Bridport Prize (UK)
- Highly Commended, Fool For Poetry International Chapbook Competition by Munster Literature Centre (UK)
- Highly Commended, Chesham Literary Festival (UK)
- Shortlisted, Alpine Fellowship Poetry Prize (UK)
- Nominated, Best of the Net (US)

== Advertising career ==
Alongside his literary career, Ryan Caidic has worked as an advertising copywriter and creative director. He describes poetry and his work in advertising as mutually sustaining and complementary disciplines.

He has been recognized as the Philippine 4As Next Gen Creative. He has won a number of advertising awards, and has served as a jury member for industry shows like New York Fest, Webby Awards, Act Responsible’s Act Care Awards, Kiev International Advertising Festival, and has been listed in creative rankings by Campaign Brief.

== Personal life ==
Ryan Caidic was born and raised in the Philippines. He wrote for school publications as the editor-in-chief throughout his early education, and later contributed to Ateneo de Manila’s student publication, Matanglawin. As of 2025, he is based in Europe with his family.
