= Bahala na =

Filipino term for risk-taking and determination or a fatalistic attitude

Bahala na (Tagalog: [baˈhala ˈna]) is a Filipino term and value of either fatalism towards life or determinism in challenging situations. It can be translated to mean "whatever happens, happens," "things will turn out fine," or as "I'll take care of things." In Sikolohiyang Pilipino (Filipino Psychology) it is described as "determination in the face of uncertainty."

This attitude can have both positive and negative consequences for the Filipino people, one being the lack of urgency or sense of responsibility for one's plight, the other being that of openness to uncertainty, the exercise of free will to take a risk and attempt to shape outcomes to a degree, in face of known and unknown factors that come into play.

== Fatalism and determinism ==
In the Philippines the fatalistic attitude is reflective of the Catholicism of the Filipino people, who entrust their fate in the hands of God. Many times bahala na is a saying that expresses a mentality that despite one's free will, one cannot do anything about the larger existing circumstances of their situation. The fatalistic interpretation may also be due to the effectiveness of psychological colonization on the attitudes of colonized people to be resigned to their fate. In other words, the colonized peoples’ fatalism is a direct reflection of the colonizers’ own “colonial fatalism,” that is, it is the fate of colonized people to be subject to their colonizers because “settler colonialism is treated as a meta-structure within which indigenous subjects are prefigured as objects to be eliminated in settler colonialism's immutable and inevitable drive for territorial control.”

== Social value of risk-taking with peace of mind ==
The determined, affirmative attitude is reflective of indigenous Filipino value system that leads to free choice, determination and goal achievement, and also a sense of peace: “Bahala na” is a positive value in at least the following situations or circumstances which are beyond one's control: (1) when calamities or accidents occur despite all precautionary measures; (2) when the death of a loved one takes place in spite of all attempts to let him/her live longer, or in spite of all careful attention made relative to the situation;(3) when the death is sudden or unexpected; (4) when one feels the uncertainties that lie ahead despite making a careful and deliberate choice or decision; and (5) when, in spite of a very extensive deliberative process, one cannot still decide what to choose until finally he picks out a choice indifferently. Here “Bahala na” enables one to have the stoic resolve and the attendant peace of mind. As Distor (1997) says,“Held close to the heart, the ‘bahala na’ phenomenon becomes a coping mechanism in the face of risky undertakings.”

In the 1940 textbook of The Filipino Way of Life: The Pluralized Philosophy, Camilo Osías describes the phrase as one exclaimed in times of danger, in the spirit of stoicism and resignation. He says it is not an expression of despair or carelessness, but a combination of fatalism AND determination. He goes on to say that it is an expression of courage and fortitude, a willingness to face difficulty and a readiness to accept the consequences.

Camilo Osías ends the content about the tradition of bahala na with a positive, hopeful statement: “The feelings of bahala na has not only entered the life of a Filipino as an individual; it has penetrated group life. It is writ large in the soul of the people. Properly directed, it may well serve as a basis for the strengthening and enrichment of individual and collective life.”

== Western Influence on the Use and Understanding of Bahala Na ==
Despite the early textbook of The Filipino Way of Life: The Pluralized Philosophy giving a clear explanation of the tradition of bahala na with a positive aspect, there are a number of school-educated Filipinos that do not express the saying this way. During the early 20th century, the widespread Philippine educational system was implemented by the colonizing rule of the United States. Philippine teachers like the rest of the urbanizing countryside were being influenced by the perceived superiority of their colonizer through Hollywood movies, the influx of Western-style fashion, and stateside products into the country, being effectively raised as consumers of U.S. customs and multinational goods. Thus, the Philippine teachers, under U.S. benevolent, colonial rule, likely opted to mention the tradition of saying "bahala na" and explain it through the eyes of the Western colonizer, as a self-negating, fatalistic attitude, uttering the phrase because one resigns himself to fate.

in 1968, Lyn Bostrom was an American psychologist that may have contributed to creating what Enriquez calls the psychological "portrait of the compliant Filipino" by describing the bahala na attitude as the equivalent of American fatalism and goes on to further describe it in escapist terms.

See also Education in the Philippines during American rule. The influence of Philippine colonial history, and colonial mentality should not be overlooked as a factor influencing this self-diminishing interpretation of the practice and social value of bahala na.

== Filipino Psychology: Determination in the Face of Uncertainty ==
In From Colonial to Liberation Psychology: The Philippine Experience, Filipino psychologist and researcher Virgilio G. Enriquez (1992) says that

[Alfredo] “Lagmay has corrected some of the misconceptions about bahala na which gave the value, and to some degree the Filipino, a bad name. Therefore, contrary to the connotation of passive fatalism and escapism suggested by Bostrom, bahala na would be a confrontative attitude. It is risk-taking in the face of the proverbial cloud of uncertainty, and the possibility of failure. It is also about an indication of an acceptance of the nature of things, including the inherent limitations of one's self. However, it is an acceptance which is not passive. It is as if one were being forced by the situation to act in his own capacity to change the present problematic condition. He is being required to be resourceful and, most importantly, creative, to make his situation better. Instead of the passive, expectant motivation often ascribed to the operation of bahala na. it is clear that bahala na operates to raise one's courage and determination. Lagmay sees bahala na as arising from a social structure that spurs one to use his inherent abilities to bring about needed change, and that bahala na is a signal to be persistent in spite of the uncertainty of things. Furthermore, Lagmay states that bahala na reflects the improvisatory personality of the Filipino, allowing him to cope and be comfortable even in indefinite, unpredictable and stressful situations.”

== Etymology ==
The following is excerpted from Sanskrit Origins of Bathala and Bahala at BahalaNaMeditations.com:

“There are many people who believe the phrase originates from the Tagalog word bathala, which means “god.”. It's easy to see and hear why this would be so as the spelling and sound of the two words are very similar, differentiated by the use of the letter and sound of “t” in the word for “god.” But in fact, the word bathala comes from the Sanskrit word of bhattara, which means “noble lord.” And bahala is a Tagalog word that actually means burden, responsibility or 100 million units of weight, and comes from the Sanskrit word bhara and Malaysian word bahara, both meaning burden, weight, or charge. “BharaNa is also a Sanskrit and Hindi word that may have etymological pertinence. The Sanskrit word of bharaNa means sustenance; it also means bearing, as in carrying a burden or weight or supporting, nourishing, and maintaining as in caring for something. And then, in Hindi, the word bharana means to complete, as in a form or task, and it also means to fill as in filling a space or container.

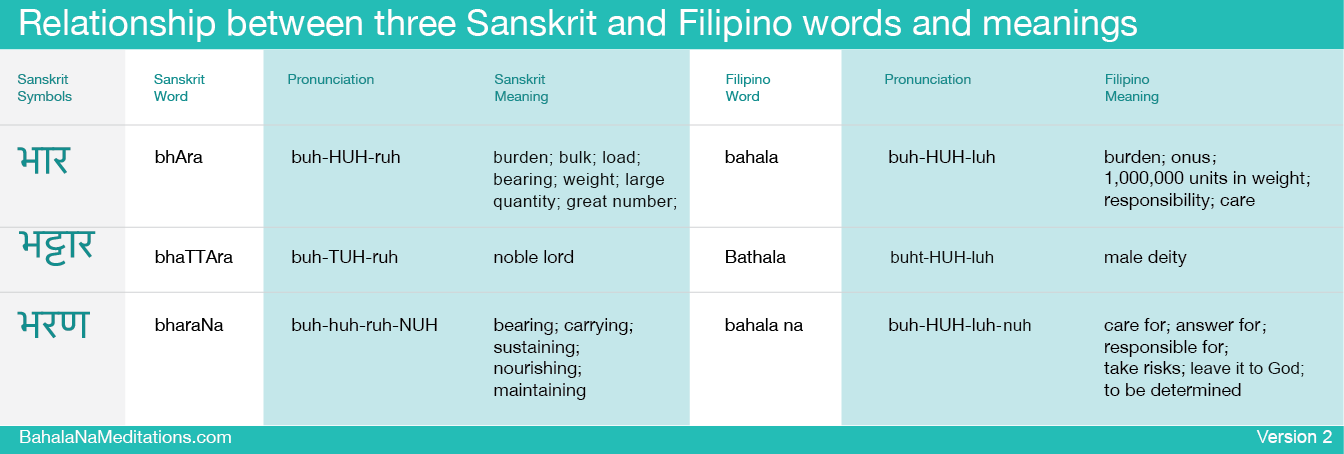
Figure 1. Sanskrit words related to Filipino words of bahala, Bathala and phrasing of bahala na. Source: BahalaNaMeditations.com

“The meanings of bharaNa to carry, bhara and bahala which both mean burden, and bahala na which means to be responsible for, seem to be related. See Figure 1 on the right.

“There are many Sanskrit words still alive in languages of the Philippines, such as the Tagalog words of mukha (face), guru (teacher), asa (hope) and katha (story), all of which still have the same meaning as the Sanskrit meanings. Other examples are diwa (idea, concept or spirit) and diwata (nature spirit, demi-goddess) which have related meanings to the original Sanskrit words of deva (divine) and devata (deity).

“So there is a possibility that the oral tradition of saying “bahala na” may have directly originated from the Sanskrit/Hindi word of "bharaNa" in meaning and sound. When the Philippine's pre-historic oral traditions and practices were being recorded in chronicles, papers and books, it was with their colonizers’ Western alphabet system, starting in the 15th century with the Spanish, and later in the 19th and 20th centuries with the United States. It's a possibility that the phrase of bahala na was always pronounced bahalana from bharaNa but was spelled out in the Western alphabet to be two distinct, and Filipino words, i.e. bahala and na.

“There are no found recorded etymological connections or citations of a direct relationship between the Sanskrit bharaNa and the Philippine bahala na. Any such relationship is merely speculation and theory at this point.

== See also ==
- Shikata ga nai
