= H. Brett Melendy =

American historian

Howard Brett Melendy (May 30, 1924 – April 19, 2008) was a prominent American historian, writer, researcher, publisher, autobiographer, dean, history professor, and filipinologist. Melendy was a professor and administrator at the San José State University in California and the University of Hawaiʻi. As a professor, he taught about the history of California and United States history. He was the first chairman of the history department of San José State University. j He was a life member of the American Historical Association.

== Family and religion ==
Melendy was born in Eureka, California, on May 30, 1924. His parents were Howard Burton and Pearl Marjorie Brett Melendy. He lived in Humboldt County during the first twenty-six years of his life. In 1952, H. Brett Melendy married Marian Ethel Robinson with whom he had three children: Brenda Dale Melendy, who lives in Kingsville, Texas, Darcie Brett Melendy Hoff who lives in Walnut Creek, California, and Lisa Marie Melendy who lives in East Hampton, Massachusetts. Melendy was a ruling elder of the Presbyterian Church.

== Education ==
From 1942 to 1945, Melendy studied at Humboldt State College. In 1946, he obtained his Bachelor of Arts degree in English from Stanford University. In 1948, he gained his M.A. in education from the Stanford Graduate School of Education. In 1952, he earned his PhD in history from Stanford University.

== Career ==
In 1955, Melendy started his teaching career at San José State College. He later became the head of the college's History Department. In 1962 and 1974, he received grants from the American Philosophical Society. From 1967 to 1968, he became a fellow in academic administration of the American Council on Education. From 1968 to 1969, he served as associate or assistant vice-president of San José State University. From 1969, he became interim or acting academic vice-president of San José State University. From 1970 to 1973, he became vice-president of the University of Hawaiʻi in Honolulu, while he was working as a professor in the History Department of the University of Hawaiʻi in Manoa. He was recognized as an emeritus professor at the University of Hawai’i.

In 1979, he returned to San José State University to act as emeritus professor and then as dean of undergraduate studies until 1981. From 1981 to 1983, he was the associate academic vice-president for undergraduate studies of San José State University, then as university archivist from 1983 to 1987, and later as interim dean for academic development from 1986 to 1987. In 1993, he was recognized as an emeritus professor at San José University.

== Death ==
In 2008, Melendy died of cancer at the age of 83 while at his home in Cupertino, California. A memorial service was held for him at the Forum at Rancho San Antonio in Cupertino.

== Works ==
Melendy's writings include major books about the social conditions and politics in twentieth-century California and Hawaiʻi, Hawaiian history, and Asian immigration to the United States. His research focused on the multiple ethnic groups in the United States. Among his works are Governors of California: Peter H. Burnett to Edmund G. Brown (1965, with Benjamin F. Gilbert as co-author), Oriental Americans (1972), Asians in America: Filipinos, Koreans, and East Indians (1977), Chinese and Japanese Americans (1984), Hawaii, America's Sugar Territory 1898–1959 (1999, with Rhoda Armstrong Hackler as co-author), Walter Francis Dillingham, 1865–1963, Hawaiian Entrepreneur and Statesman (1996), The Federal Government's Search for Communists in the Territory of Hawaii (2002), and the autobiographical book or memoir Growing Up Along California's North Coast: Boyhood Days in Humboldt County during the 1930s (2004). As a publisher, Melendy published the Hawaiian Journal of History and many other professional journals. He was an article contributor to several encyclopedias.

The materials and records Melendy collected while acting as the university archivist of San José State University from 1983 to 1987 are composed of academic journals, newspaper clippings, photographs, and handwritten and typewritten papers. The materials and records, with the majority encompassing the years 1955 to 1985, have been preserved and named as The San José State University Faculty Papers of H. Brett Melendy, 1928-1985.
