= Virgilio Enriquez =

Filipino psychologist (1942-1994)

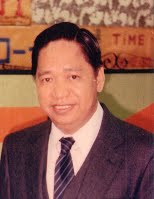
- Born: November 24, 1942; Balagtas, Bulacan, Philippines
- Died: August 31, 1994 (aged 51); San Francisco, California, United States
- Other names: Doc. E, Ver
- Occupations: Professor, Pioneer of Sikolohiyang Pilipino
- Known for: Father of Filipino Psychology, "Ama ng Sikolohiyang Pilipino"

Virgilio G. Enriquez (November 24, 1942 – August 31, 1994), also known as Doc E, was a social psychologist and the Father of Filipino psychology "Ama ng Sikolohiyang Pilipino". He was born on November 24, 1942, at Santol, Balagtas, formally Bigaa, Bulacan. He was the youngest of five children born to Arsenio Libiran Enriquez and Rosario Galvez Gaspar. He was the founder of the Pambansang Samahan sa Sikolohiyang Pilipino, (corporate name: National Association for Sikolohiyang Pilipino, Inc.).

Through his efforts and discoveries, the concept of psychology has gradually been acknowledged by more people in the Philippines and other non-western cultures. The research model he used provided valuable information on culture-as-target and culture-as-source approach which have a tremendous influence in regulating practical applications. Before Enriquez, the study of psychology in the Philippines was not productive due to a language barrier; a large amount of psychological literature from Western history was only available in English. Enriquez's work inspired Filipino researchers with the concept of Western research methods in psychology and has broadened the view of cross-cultural psychology.

Filipino psychology remains a controversial topic. From the perspective of future development, Filipino psychology will pay more attention to individual and feminist treatments. The current therapeutic methods given in Filipino psychology are more group-oriented instead of individual-based thus individual patients will not receive precise treatments and follow-up diagnosis corresponding to their conditions. There is still an issue of unstandardized testing instruments in terms of therapeutic techniques which lack proper regulations. In spite of its imperfections, the growth of Filipino psychology has contributed to the increased social acceptance for psychological disorders and initiative for seeking effective treatments.

== Education ==
Enriquez earned his B.A. in philosophy from the University of the Philippines Diliman in 1961. In 1966, he attended Northwestern University in Evanston, Illinois, to pursue a master's degree, and later a Doctorate degree in social psychology. He then returned to the Philippines in 1971 to continue teaching psychology. Filipino psychology was created because he noticed that scholars and intellectuals in the Philippines were dissatisfied with the Western-oriented take on psychology as their models did not fit with Filipino culture and behavior. As such, he focused more on a Filipino-oriented teaching model in his teaching and research including using Filipino to lecture and exam.

== Career history ==
=== Filipino psychology ===
Even as there was "no concerted effort in the 1960s to reject and correct traditional way of teaching and studying psychology", this changed in the 1970s when Enriquez introduced Filipino psychology, also called Sikolohiyang Pilipino—his most significant contribution to the realm of psychology. According to Enriquez, Filipino psychology is the fruit of experience, ideas, and orientation of Filipinos. He also said that a Filipino can better understand himself and in turn, is able to improve his life more. Different from traditional psychology, Filipino psychology identifies what the key concepts are in order to have an understanding of a Filipino's mind, personality and behaviour, while also looking at human behaviour from non-western culture context.

Filipino psychology "began in the early 1970s initially as a protest against Philippine psychology's colonial character and the uncritical acceptance of American psychological models." It "urges Filipino psychologists to confront social problems and national issues as part of their responsibility as social scientists." A way to understand the Filipino character, it is helpful to analyze the social interaction in a Philippine setting. A conceptual distinction in many different levels and modes of interaction is provided by the Filipino language. There are 8 levels of interaction that were found by Santiago and Enriquez; these levels include pakikitungo (transaction/civility with), pakikisalamuha (interaction with), pakikilahok (joining/participating with), pakikibagay (in conformity with/in accord with), pakikisama (getting along with), pakikipag-palagayang-Ioob (having rapport with), pakikisangkot (getting involved with), and pakikiisa (being one with)." Enriquez coined the term 'kapwa', and he believes it to be the only term that both categories of "outsider" (ibang tao) and "insider" (Hindi ibang tao). He used this term to "explain Filipino interpersonal relations." The English word "others" is what is thought to be the closest English equivalent of "kapwa." Although "kapwa" is similar, it means the unity of the 'self' and the 'others'. A prominent student of Enriquez, Katrin de Guia also studied kapwa and asserted that it is the shared identity between the self and others.

=== Indigenous Psychology ===
Virgilio Enriquez was a prominent advocate of indigenous psychology in Asia. This academic movement arose from Western psychology's lack of applicability to non-Western societies and thereby promoted cultural sensitivity and appropriateness within psychology by enabling each culture to develop their own frameworks and methodologies. Enriquez coined the term culture-as-source to indicate that every culture is a contributor to psychological knowledge, contrasting from the approach he referred to as culture-as-target which regards cultures as being dependent on other cultures to gain psychological knowledge.

Enriquez and his colleague Carmen Santiago made a contribution to indigenous research methods by providing data gathering techniques that are relevant and applicable to Filipino culture. Their research model is made up of two scales that exist on a continuum including Iskala ng Mananaliksik as well as Iskala ng Pagtutunguhan ng Mananaliksik at Kalahok. The former being the researcher/method scale where the observational methods are unobtrusive such as pagmamasid, where no manipulation occurs, rather the investigator solely observes the natural environment. The latter being the researcher-participant relationship scale that is regarded as more intrusive, involving a stronger relationship between the respondents and the investigators. For instance, multiple encounters in the respondents' home involving participant interviewing take place, referred to as padalaw-dala w. Techniques that lie in the center of the continuum, including the pagtatanung-tanong research model entails casual interaction between both parties. It incorporates a combination of surveys and informant interviewing where questions are asked to different respondents in random order.

== Accomplishments and contributions to psychology ==
=== Accomplishments ===
As Enriquez worked to break boundaries and instigate different learning practices, he received many high accolades in his profession. Most notably in 1982, he was given the Outstanding Young Scientist of the Philippines award by the National Academy of Science and Technology, and after his passing was awarded the National Achievement in the Social Sciences in 1997 from the National Research Council of the Philippines.

=== Contributions ===
Enriquez made several substantial contributions to the field of psychology, particularly in relation to Filipino values and society. Similar to many countries who are also colonized, there is a sense of identity loss and cultural theft as adaptation to Western practices occur. After getting his Ph.D. in the US, Enriquez returned to the Philippines to create new teaching methods in collaboration with the University of the Philippines with the goal of taking a deeper look at "Philippine psychology and developing creativity and inventiveness among Filipinos." On this path of education and research, Enriquez helped to officiate the First National Conference on Filipino Psychology (Unang Pambansang Kumperensya sa Sikolohiyang Pilipino) as well as created the Philippine Psychology Research House (PPRH), later known as the Philippine Psychology Research and Training House, home to Filipino psychology and the growth of research with Filipino perspective.

=== Publications ===
Enriquez is also well known for the numerous books he authored throughout his career such as Indigenous Psychology and National Consciousness (Enriquez, 1989) to his final publication Pagbabangong-Dangal: Indigenous Psychology & Cultural Empowerment (Enriquez, 1994). Areas of his research included "indigenous psychology, Filipino personality, psychology of language and politics, philosophy and values, cross-cultural psychology, and Pilipinolohiya (Philippine Studies)."

=== Later life ===
Enriquez went on to become Chairman of the Department of Psychology at the University of the Philippines from 1977 to 1982. He continued to inspire and encourage students to embrace the Filipino language and culture, furthering the growth of Filipino psychology and continuity of the national language. He died at the age of 51 on August 31, 1994, in San Francisco, California due to cancer.
