= International Association of Filipinologists =

1889 scholarly association planned by José Rizal

- Asociación Internacional de Filipinistas
- Founder: José Rizal
- Type: Planned international learned society
- Legal status: Proposed congress not held
- Purpose: Scientific and historical study of the Philippines
- Designated president: Ferdinand Blumentritt
- Designated secretary: José Rizal

The International Association of Filipinologists (Spanish: Asociación Internacional de Filipinistas) was an international scholarly association planned by Filipino writer and reformist José Rizal in 1889. It was intended to coordinate the scientific and historical study of the Philippines and to convene an international congress in Paris during the 1889 Exposition Universelle. Rizal prepared a prospectus, sought the participation of European scholars, and designated a directing committee headed by Ferdinand Blumentritt. Its proposed congress did not take place.

== Background ==
Rizal developed the proposal while conducting research on Philippine history in London. Historian Esteban A. de Ocampo attributed the project to Rizal's work with Philippine materials at the British Museum and his desire to draw the attention of European scholars to the country's historical record. On 14 January 1889, Rizal sent Blumentritt a prospectus for the association and proposed that he serve as its president.

The planned association was also connected with the international attention expected to accompany the 1889 Paris exposition. John Nery described it as one of several projects undertaken by Rizal in anticipation of the exposition, alongside his plans for a congress devoted to Philippine studies.

Rizal attempted to recruit specialists from different European countries. In letters written to German ethnologist Adolf Bernhard Meyer between 14 February and 4 March 1889, he asked Meyer to help identify a Dutch scholar who could serve on the association's directing committee.

== Proposed organization ==
The association's draft statutes stated that its purpose was to study the Philippines from scientific and historical perspectives. To pursue this objective, the association was to convene international congresses, sponsor public competitions on Philippine subjects, and work toward the establishment of a library and a museum containing Philippine materials.

The statutes contemplated founding, ordinary, and honorary members. Ordinary members would pay an annual subscription of ten francs. The association was to be administered by a president, vice-president, two counsellors, and a secretary.

The prospectus listed the following proposed directing committee:

Proposed directing committee
Proposed office	Person
President	Ferdinand Blumentritt
Vice-president	Edmund Plauchut
Counsellor	Reinhold Rost
Counsellor	Antonio Maria Regidor
Secretary	José Rizal

The surviving prospectus expressly recorded that Plauchut, Regidor, and Rizal had accepted their respective nominations.

== Planned congress ==
The association's first congress was scheduled for Paris in August 1889, during the Exposition Universelle. Its draft programme proposed a broad and interdisciplinary examination of the Philippines, including geography, geology, hydrography, climate, flora, fauna, population, government, religion, literature, industry, agriculture, commerce, and bibliography.

Rizal divided the historical portion of the programme into the Philippines before 1521; the period from 1521 to 1808; and the period from 1808 to the 1872 Cavite mutiny. Separate sections were devoted to Philippine languages and to what the programme termed “races and independent regions”, including Muslim sultanates, independent communities, and Negrito peoples.

According to historians Ambeth Ocampo and Filomeno V. Aguilar Jr., the section concerning the independent regions was added after Blumentritt called Rizal's attention to the peoples and territories that had not been incorporated into Spanish-controlled, Christianized lowland society. Aguilar interpreted the programme as evidence of the limits of the early ilustrado conception of the Filipino nation, because Rizal's original outline placed Muslim, highland, and other non-Christian peoples outside the principal historical experience of the Christianized lowland indios.

== Outcome and historical significance ==
The planned Paris congress was not held. Nery attributed the failure of the project to difficulties in securing the necessary approvals and clearances. The available sources consequently document the association primarily through Rizal's prospectus, correspondence, proposed committee, and congress programme rather than through records of a completed congress or continuing organizational activity.

Although the project was not realized, historians have examined its programme as part of Rizal's attempt to construct a Philippine history from a Filipino perspective. Ocampo used the programme to explain Rizal's periodization of Philippine history, while Aguilar analysed it as evidence of how nineteenth-century ilustrados defined—and initially limited—the territorial and social boundaries of the emerging Filipino nation.

== See also ==
- Philippine studies
- Propaganda Movement
- La Liga Filipina
