= Asian psychology =

Asian psychology is a branch of cultural psychology that studies psychological concepts as they relate to Asian culture. Psychologists studying these issue are often aligned with cross-cultural psychology. Asian Psychology is the study of countries of Asia and their peoples; the way they behave, act, communicate, and what their belief system, as well as the differences between the native culture and the culture of Asian-Americans is known as "Asian Psychology."

== Asian behavior ==
As pointed out by Shinobu Kitayama, professor of psychology and Director of the Culture & Cognition Program at the University of Michigan, culture can have a profound impact on the way people think about and perceive the world around them. East Asians may think differently from Westerners (See also, Cultural differences in self-concept and Self-construal.) Kitayama proposed that unlike the traditional American point-of-view which accentuates the importance of one's self and makes oneself independent, an Asian will instead feel more interdependent.

== Movement ==
Asian psychologists wanted to have an expanding role in the science of psychology, but felt limited due to the heavy western influence. Predominant figures in Asian psychology are Qicheng Jing in China, Hiroshi Azuma in Japan, Ku-Shu Yang in Taiwan, Durganand Sinha in India, and Virgilio Enriquez in the Philippines.

== Asian American Journal of Psychology ==
The Asian American Journal of Psychology® is the official publication of the Asian American Psychological Association and focuses on research, practice, advocacy, education, and policy related to Asian American psychology. The journal publishes empirical, theoretical, methodological, and practice-oriented articles, as well as book reviews, addressing topics relevant to Asian American individuals and communities, including prevention, intervention, training, and social justice. Particular emphasis is placed on empirical studies employing quantitative, qualitative, and mixed-methods approaches.

== Asian Journal of Social Psychology ==
The Asian Journal of Social Psychology promotes research and academic exchange aimed at advancing social psychology in Asia. It publishes theoretical and empirical research by Asian scholars, as well as by researchers with an interest in Asian cultures and societies.

The journal is partially funded through a Grant-in-Aid for Publication of Scientific Research Results provided by the Japan Society for the Promotion of Science.

== AAPA Online ==
AAPA was founded in 1972 and is the largest organization of faculty, students, researchers, and practitioners interested in Asian American psychology. Our members and initiatives have positively impacted psychological treatment, education, training, research, policy and social justice advocacy, through research dissemination, organizational policy statements and collaboration with other psychological organizations for publications, training initiatives, and disseminating resources for serving Asian American communities.

== Contributions ==
Historically, much of the research and theoretical development in psychology was dominated by scholars from the United States and Europe. In recent decades, however, this pattern has begun to change, with an increasing number of contributions emerging from Asian countries and scholars.

== See also ==
- Filipino psychology
- Indian psychology
- Morita therapy
- Naikan therapy
