= Matanglawin (publication) =

Student publication of Ateneo de Manila University

- Official logo of Matanglawin Ateneo. Rebranding by EB 2016-2017
- Type: Student publication
- Format: Magazine, Online
- Owner: Ateneo de Manila University
- Founded: 1975
- Headquarters: MVP 201-202, Ateneo de Manila University, Loyola Heights, Quezon City, Philippines

Matanglawin, literally "Hawk's Eye" and usually contracted as Mata, is the official student publication of the Ateneo de Manila University in the Filipino language. The student paper dedicates itself to discussing socio-political issues in the Philippines, the plight and suffering of the working class, as well as pressing student rights issues. It is part of the Ateneo's Confederation of Publications (COP), including The GUIDON and Heights. The editor-in-chief of the publication for schoolyear 2024-2025 is Lance B. Arevada.

From a circulation of a few mimeographed copies hidden in books at the Rizal Library in the 1970s, Matanglawin is now published in glossy form and has a circulation of more than 2,000, serving the Loyola Schools community. Copies of the publication are also sent to student publications across the Philippines.

== Origin of the name ==
The word or name Matanglawin contained negative connotations based from Philippine literary canon. The character of Cabesang Tales from Jose Rizal's novel El filibusterismo took the word as his moniker when he descended into terrorism and banditry after having been maltreated and denied justice by the Spanish colonial government. There were also characters in the plays of patriot playwrights Aurelio Tolentino and Onofre Pagsanghan representing the Filipinos who became bootlickers and lapdogs of the colonial masters named as such, characterized by their rapacity and brutality against fellow Filipinos.

The publication, however, offers a different explanation as to how the name defines its work by breaking down the word into three other words: "mata" (eye) for the student journalist's meticulous attention to detail, data, wordings and critical observation; "tanglaw" (illumination) for the writer's duty to explain difficult topics to the common reader while at the same time offering new insights; and "lawin" (hawk) for the tradition of courage in championing the cause of justice and the rights of the poor, though deviating from any ideological advocacy.

== Branches of Service (Bagwisan) ==
The publication does not limit itself to being simply a dead piece of paper; Matanglawin also presents itself as an organization of students who advocate social involvement and substantial reforms within its avenues of service to the University and the country. In view of this, the organization is divided into seven branches or "bagwisan" (literally, "wing"):

- Sulatin at Saliksikan (Content and Research): The lifeblood of the publication, it molds its members to be critical and observant of the myriad issues confronting students inside and outside campus. They also propagate a so-called new brand of journalism, one which is not "objective" as they believe it is already obsolete in such period in time.
- Sining (Art): Through works of art or taken photographs, this branch gives life to the publication's otherwise pure and stale text, providing the readers an accurate glimpse of the issues they are reading about.
- Disenyo (Design): Following the principle of "organization in chaos", this branch strives to make the publication palatable to the reader's viewing through effective design and layout of text and images for the magazine issues and online materials.
- Pandayan (Formations): The vanguard of the publication's organizational characteristics, it is given the responsibility of preparing the members and journalists in fulfilling their objectives through educational discussions, team building seminars and outside activities.
- Proyekto (Projects): This branch gives its members a chance of being able to do projects for the entire year, that is aimed to make people aware of sociopolitical issues, historical, and current events that are relevant to the society.
- Social Media (Social Media): Through online communication, this branch connects with netizens using the organization's official website and other platforms (Facebook, Twitter) for efficient posting of articles, announcements, and other information that involves the organization.
- Teknolohiya (Technology): The newest branch of the publication, it provides members with opportunities to utilize digital tools such as websites to further enhance the online presence of the publication.

== Awards and Recognition Received ==
Matanglawin has garnered a multitude of awards in its 40 years of existence. It has been nominated for the Catholic Mass Media Awards. In 2002, it has also won the Best Magazine Award at the annual Gawad Ernesto Rodriguez Jr, sponsored by the College Editors Guild of the Philippines. Its website and spoof issues have also been recognized by the said organization.

The publication is known for the quality of its investigative journalism, and its editorial columns. The spoof issue, Tanganglawin, has been cited for mixing tabloid humor with scathing political commentary. To make the organization more enticing to aspiring members who do not just want to write, it has included projects that allowed members to be involved in the planning and execution, as well as for participants to be able to have a discussion on relevant issues in the current context in a light and unconventional manner. Such projects include Tumpak, a competition for college students, and Bertigo, a competition for high school students in Metro Manila and nearby cities.

== Alumni ==
- Fr. Jose Magadia, S.J., former Philippine Jesuit Provincial
- Fr. Albert Alejo, S.J.
- Fr. Emmanuel "Nono" Alfonso, S.J., Jesuit Communications head
- Chay Hofileña, Investigations and Research Head and Newsbreak Editor of Rappler, and instructor of the Department of Communication of the Ateneo de Manila University
- Dr. Benjamin Tolosa, Vice President for Mission Integration of the Ateneo de Manila University and former department chair of the Department of Political Science
- Dr. Anne Lan K. Candelaria, Assistant Vice President for Graduate Education of the Ateneo de Manila University and former director of the Ateneo Center for Asian Studies (ACAS): currently serves as the Moderator of the publication
- Dr. Agustin Martin Rodriguez, former department chair of the Ateneo de Manila University's Department of Philosophy
- Dr. Marita Concepcion Castro Guevara, associate professor of the Department of Interdisciplinary Studies of the Ateneo de Manila University and research associate of the Institute of Philippine Culture-School of Social Sciences
- Dr. Emerald Jay Ilac, associate professor of the Ateneo's Department of Psychology
- Rambo Talabong, freelance journalist and former Multimedia Reporter of Rappler
- Allan Madrilejos, former editor-in-chief of FHM Philippines
- Mikael de Lara Co, one of the recipients of Palanca Awards
- Dr. Michael Pante, History instructor of the Ateneo de Manila University and convenor, Kontra Daya
- Eldridge Myles Tan, Digital Channels Director at Globe Telecom and lecturer of the John Gokongwei School of Management of the Ateneo de Manila University
- Mark Benedict F. Lim, Filipino instructor of the Ateneo de Manila University, Palanca Awards recipient
- Jan Fredrick Cruz, lecturer of the Department of Economics and European Studies Program of the Ateneo de Manila University
- Victoria Camille C. Tulad, senior news correspondent of GMA News and Public Affairs
- Elymar Apao, founder of UX Philippines
- Dr. Aaron Rom Moralina, former History instructor of the Ateneo de Manila University
