= Filipinology =

Study of the Philippines and its people

In general, Filipinology or Philippineology (Filipino: Pilipinolohíya, Spanish: Filipinología) or more formally known as Philippine studies refers to: "the study of the Philippines and its people".

It encompasses the study of Philippine history, Philippine culture, Philippine languages, Philippine society, Philippine life, Philippine psyche or Philippine psychology, Philippine politics, and Philippine government. The approaches or perspectives of Philippine Studies could be theoretical, interdisciplinary, comparative, transnational, and global. Filipinology was developed in the University of the Philippines Diliman and had become part of curricula in some colleges and universities inside and outside the Philippines.

== Purpose ==
Learning goals of Filipinology include the comprehension, appreciation, and critical evaluation of the Philippines through Philippine History, contemporary issues in Philippine community, and Philippine Humanities such as Filipino philosophy, Filipino music, Filipino art, Philippine literature, and Philippine dance. The incorporation of Philippine Humanities through literary readings, listening to musical recordings, film viewings, and field trips provide development of cultural acceptance and aesthetic sense. Philippine Studies extend to connecting contributions of persons of Filipino descent to new settings and culture (such as Overseas Filipinos to other countries). Apart from providing education and awareness about the Philippines, Filipinology aims to make students of Philippine Studies aware of Filipino ethnic identity by experiencing Philippine culture.

== Filipinologists ==
Experts on Filipinology or Philippineology are called filipinologists or philippineologists (Spanish: Filipinologista) (Tagalog: Pilipinolohista); literally “experts in Philippine culture”.

According to Rosa M. Vallejo the "foremost non-Filipino filipinologist" is the Spaniard bibliographer Wenceslao Emilio Retana y Gamboa.

Other prominent foreign filipinologists are William Henry Scott, H. Brett Melendy Ferdinand Blumentritt, and A.V. Hartendorp. Among the prominent Russian filipinologists are Vladimir Makarenko and Podberezsky.

== Publications ==
Publications dealing with Filipinology seek to reach specialist and non-specialist audience from and outside the Philippines. Among such Philippine Studies literature is the quarterly journal Philippine Studies: Historical and Ethnographic Viewpoints published by the Ateneo de Manila University. Founded in 1953, the journal serves as a “forum” for disseminating many aspects of life in the Philippines through research in history, humanities and social sciences, “friendly and constructive debate”, and the expression of scholarly views. Another publication is the book written by Remigio E. Agpalo entitled Adventures in Political Science. With an introduction written by Zeus A. Salazar, Agpalo’s book is a “major contribution” to Filipinology that covers important areas of political science in the Philippines, including political dynamics, comparative government, comparative politics, Philippine government, Philippine politics, political philosophy, political theory, political methodology, constitutional law, modernization and political development.

== See also ==
- International Association of Filipinologists
- List of academic disciplines
