= Indigenous psychology =

Study of human behaviors native to the region

Indigenous psychology is defined by Kim and Berry as "the scientific study of human behavior or mind that is native, that is not transported from other regions, and that is designed for its people." There is a strong emphasis on how one's actions are influenced by the environment surrounding them as well as the aspects that make it up. This would include analyzing the context, in addition to the content that combine to make the domain that one is living in. The context would consist of the family, social, cultural, and ecological pieces and the content would consist of the meaning, values, and beliefs. Since the mid 1970s, there has been outcry about the traditional views from psychologists across the world, from Africa to Australia and many places in between about how the methods only reflect what would work in Europe and the Americas.

There are several ways that separate indigenous psychology from the traditional general psychology. First, there is a strong emphasis on the examining of phenomena in context in order to discover how one's culture influences their behaviors and thought patterns. Secondly, instead of solely focusing on Native populations, it actually includes information based on any group of peoples that can be deemed "exotic", in one area or another. This makes indigenous psychology a necessity for groups all over the world. Third is the fact that indigenous psychology is innovative because instead of only using one method for everyone, there is time dedicated to the creation of techniques that work on an individual basis, while working to learn why they are successful in the regions that they are being used in. There is advocacy for an array of procedures, such as qualitative, experimental, comparative, philosophical analysis and a combination of them all. Fourth, it debunks the idea that only members of these indigenous groups have the ability to achieve true understanding of how culture affects their life experiences. In fact, an outsider's view is extremely valuable when it comes to indigenous psychology because it can discover abnormalities not originally noticed by members of the group. Finally, there are concepts that can only be explained by indigenous psychology. This is due to researchers having a hard time conceptualizing these phenomenon.

Despite there being noticeable differences between cultures, they all share one common goal: "to address the forces that shape affective, behavioral, and cognitive human systems that in turn underlie the attitudes, behaviors, beliefs, expectations, and values of the members of each unique culture"

== Indigenous psychology movement ==
Kim, Yang and Hwang (2006) distinguish 10 characteristics of indigenous psychology.

1. It emphasizes examining psychological phenomena in ecological, historical and cultural context.
2. Indigenous psychology needs to be developed for all cultural, native and ethnic groups.
3. It advocates use of multiple methods.
4. It advocates the integration of "insiders", "outsiders" and multiple perspectives to obtain comprehensive and integrated understanding.
5. It acknowledges that people have a complex and sophisticated understanding of themselves and it is necessary to translate their practical and episodic understanding into analytical knowledge.
6. It is part of a scientific tradition that advocates multiple perspectives, but not multiple psychologies or absolute relativism.
7. Although descriptive analysis is the starting point of research, its final goal is to discover psychological universals that can be theoretically and empirically verified.
8. It is a part of the cultural sciences tradition in which human agency, meaning and context are incorporated into the research design.
9. It advocates a linkage of humanities (which focus on human experience and creativity) with social sciences (which focus empirical analysis and verification).
10. Two starting points of research in indigenous psychology can be identified: indigenization from without and indigenization from within.

Although there is debate within the indigenous psychology movement about whether indigenous psychology represents a more universalistic or a more relativistic approach, most of these 10 characteristics are advocated by the majority of those in the indigenous psychology movement.

Political and economic instability has greatly hindered the development of psychology as a science in Latin America, South Africa, and Indian-Asian Psychology. This problem is a phenomenon that is present across the majority of non-northwestern indigenous psychologies, creating unstable societies.

Lack of national capital creates a shortage in influential professional fields like psychology and propagates the science of the leading countries. Nations such as the United States, that flourish economically, affect the poorer and less flourishing countries, and in doing so interject their western ideologies the indigenous nations with whom they trade. Allwood and Berry note six sources of influence on the development of global indigenous psychologies:

1. changes in developing countries in the 1970s stimulated endogenous and indigenous rethinking about their social and economic conditions by social and behavioral scientists;
2. their dissatisfaction with what they had learned from Western disciplines for solving problems of their homelands;
3. their growing dissatisfaction with the unquestioned, imitative, and explicative nature of psychological research that is deeply rooted in Western psychology;
4. self-reflection on their own social and cultural characteristics that were beyond Western psychological construction;
5. the awareness by some Western psychologists that the nature of psychology was 'monocultural', 'Euro-American', and 'indigenous psychology of the West'; and
6. the parochial and insular stands of Western psychology, which disregarded the interests and research done in other countries and languages.

Each individual indigenous culture maintains its own emic explanations for, and solutions to, their own psychological and behavioral issues. Western psychology needs to shift over and learn to understand the indigenous cultures in their own setting, as Allwood and Berry state, "…the science has a dual responsibility: to understand people in their own terms, and to search for general principles of human behavior. The development of an [indigenous psychology] is valuable in its own right, but they may also collectively serve as building blocks in creating a more general psychology."

In South Africa, specifically, apartheid was a major downfall for their psychology. This period in time intentionally neglected and isolated the field of psychology. "...in 1948 the Afrikaner National Party gained power and created the system of apartheid to maintain control over the country’s social, economic, and political system".

In India-Asian psychology, there are three strands of psychology which are defined by Rao (1988):

1. "...general psychology ... that has universal relevance and application...
2. "...country and region-specific psychology ... the study of geographically bound persons ..."
3. "...native based weltanschauung psychology ... driven by the understanding of geographically bound persons yet ... highly theoretical or philosophical component"

In order for these different countries to better focus their psychological standpoints, different programs need to be instituted and more persons need to become involved in becoming psychologists. "The current and future states of… indigenous psychologies, require the sustained growth of their scientific research base at the same pace as their applied professional interventions".

Indigenous psychologies can be alike when they include two different categories of psychological knowledge, explicitly, scientific and applied knowledge reflected in scientific and professional psychology. Each indigenous psychology prioritizes the two in a distinctive way. Trends do exist between more industrialized nations such as the United States. Challenges arise when trying to achieve a successful applied psychology in a culture. One challenge is finding adequate resources. Another challenge is shaping the practice of psychology to suit the circumstances a new culture. It is important to be able to understand the difference between indigenous psychologies and psychological specialties. Psychological specialties include such topics of study lifespan developmental psychology, health psychology, organizational psychology, and social psychology. Indigenous psychologies are culturally specific, and aim to describe, explain, or predict psychological phenomena from within a given culture's worldview.

Indigenous psychology, as defined by Heelas and Lock (1981), consists of the cultural views, theories, classifications and assumptions coupled with the overarching social institutions that influence psychological topics in each respective culture. While indigenous psychologies have existed for a long time, only recently have they been studied in the context of global psychology. While international psychology influences indigenous psychology, it is within each indigenous psychology that the unique histories, social mores, needs and practicalities of a certain culture can be addressed. For example, many Indian psychologists with Western training have incorporated their instruction to include aspects of Indian culture that aren’t necessarily relevant to Western psychology. They have learned to place more emphasis on extended family and community which is more suited to the societal norms of Indian culture than Western culture. Western European and American psychologies have historically had the resources to advance psychology both in the applied fields and scientifically. This has not been the case for many indigenous psychologies. For example, in India, where the population is well over one billion, as of 2005 there were only seventy universities teaching psychology. The lack of trained professionals and the demands of an impoverished population have left psychologists in India struggling to meet the needs of its citizens. This has often taken priority over scientific advancement.

Indigenous psychology is useful for studying the impact of political, economic, religious, and social aspects on a specific society. South Africa for example, has been in political and racial turmoil for decades if not centuries, enduring violence and apartheid. Development of indigenous psychology as a focus can limit influence of western concepts and encourage cultivation of socially appropriate methods for the area. According to Lawson, Graham, and Baker, South African psychology should address specific issues related to apartheid such as violence, poverty, racism, and HIV/AIDS to overcome social unrest. Other issues that should also be addressed include addressing the lingering individual trauma associated with apartheid and using a more inclusionary theory versus the exclusionary policies of past psychologies.

It is important to understand the importance of globalization when exploring indigenous psychologies. In a May 2006 article from the Monitor, the APA Senior Director of International Affairs, Merry Bullock discusses globalization of psychology. The article defines globalization as the movement of people and knowledge across borders in the attempt to establish common goals and to develop a homogenized world view of psychology. According to Lawson, Graham, and Baker, "The challenge facing global psychology is trying to find a way to integrate psychology with culture for a more complete understanding of the Human affective, behavioral and cognitive systems".

Globalization is also linked to indigenous psychology. In the globalization of psychology there is the hope that Western psychological ideals can be integrated with indigenous psychologies in order to address specific needs of particular countries and/or cultures. Bullock of the APA addresses the opportunities of incorporating Western psychological ideals with ingenious psychologies when she writes:

Globalization offers a tremendous opportunity for psychology to enrich its content, methods and scope. Like all opportunities, however, this must be nurtured, and it must be addressed by open discussion about how to do it. Although we might all agree that it is important to keep an inquiring mind, to share and learn as well as to inform and teach, we also know that our cognitive and social systems make this difficult to implement. To do so, we need strategic and open discussion about assumptions and biases, and we need collaborative interaction to seek a common set of psychological principles

— Bullock, Toward a Global Psychology, p. 9.

The future of psychology is expanding worldwide contributing to the formation of psychologies tailored to fit each culture around the world yet linked to an evolving global psychology." Understanding indigenous psychologies and finding a way to incorporate them into already established psychological knowledge will positively change the field of psychology.

While it is important and necessary that we find a way for indigenous psychologies and global psychologies to mix, we must be careful that assimilation or its predecessors not follow as a result of our desire to mix differing cultural ideals. "Assimilation refers to those processes whereby groups with distinctive identities become culturally and socially fused." When assimilation occurs it forces the structural context of a society to change often forcing its cultural traditions to undergo a new development. Assimilation occurs most often when a dominant group and less controlling group interact. While it provides a way for better social interaction and communication to happen it is often the cause of one culture losing its traditions and original beliefs.

Related to indigenous psychology is a field called critical psychology. This branch of psychology investigates how and why psychology focuses on the individual and disregards power differentials, social, and racial impacts on psychopathology. This branch may be applicable specifically in South Africa due to the apartheid. Authors Painter and Terre Blanche (2004) analyze critical psychology and compare it to what they call mainstream psychology. They describe steps being taken to apply social, political, economical, and racial influences to the field in South Africa and a concern for psychology in South Africa mirroring psychology in the UK and US which would be counter-productive. The advocacy of using social influences in South African society by Painter and Terre Blanche supports the effort to apply indigenous psychology in the area. Further application of indigenous psychology or similar methods will contribute to the field of global psychology.

== Indigenous psychologies ==
Three things are in common with indigenous societies including a shortage of resources, professional vs. scientific priority of psychology and the challenge of integrating psychology with culture. Indigenous psychologies practice applied psychology over research psychology. They often lack financial support and resources for research psychology. They end to focus on the application of psychological knowledge to overcome challenges facing their country such as strengthening education, employment, health, population control, ethnic and religious conflicts rather than allocating limited resources to expand research psychology. With indigenous psychologies they have evolved more as a profession than a science. Instability of a country greatly hinders the development of psychology. Indigenous psychologies may be influenced by western psychology but develop it to better fit their culture.

=== Native American psychology ===
The concept of "parallel lives" is a useful one for understanding more recent Native American experience so as to better understand how Native American indigenous ways of knowing have been impacted by historical events following the arrival of European and other settlers to the North American continent. Ed Edmo, a well-known Native American storyteller, author, and poet, comparing his experience of the deliberate flooding of Celilo Falls near The Dalles, Oregon in order to build a dam with that of his friend Lani Roberts, a European-American, writes: "our lives were lived in parallel fashion because of the differences in our ethnic heritage," and "we grew up in the same geographical space but lived in radically different worlds" as a result of the profound racism that Native people have suffered.

An excellent resource for better understanding Native American Psychology in terms of pathology stemming in large part from the traumas inflicted on Native American peoples as a result of their contact with European settlers, is Harold Napoleon's book Yuuyaraq: The Way of the Human Being. Harold Napoleon is a Yup'ik who wrote his book to try to make sense of the profound sadness of his people, and to understand how he came to cause the death of his own son as a result of alcohol abuse. In the book, Harold suggests that his people were suffering from a kind of post-traumatic stress syndrome as a result of the Great Death in which his culture and people were nearly wiped out by disease and other traumatic experiences resulting from contact with European settlers. He further suggests that denial, nallunguarluku, literally 'pretending it didn't happen', has become something of a cultural trait, one manifestation of which is difficulty in talking about painful circumstances...which can lead to alienation, anger, and self-destructive behavior that some people seek to numb with alcohol.

Napoleon writes: "Yuuyaraq (the way of the human being) encompassed the spirit world in which the Yup'ik lived. It outlined the way of living in harmony with this spirit world and with the spirit beings which inhabited this world". Despite the traumas inflicted on Native peoples, from the Great Death(s) to the forced migration and relocation of the Trail of Tears and reservation life, this connection to spirit is something which Native Americans have in common with other racial/ethnic minority groups in the United States, such as African Americans, Asian Americans, and Latino/Hispanic Americans which all "place strong emphasis on the interplay and interdependence of spiritual life and healthy functioning". While in the West, "incorporating religion in the rational decision-making process or in the conduct of therapy has generally been seen as unscientific and unprofessional", such spiritual "indigenous healing methods are beginning to be seen as having much to offer Western forms of mental health practice. These contributions are valuable "not only because multiple belief systems now exist in our society, but also because counseling and psychotherapy have historically neglected the spiritual dimension of human existence". It is certain that Western psychology has much to learn from pathological as well as positive psychological traits associated with specific indigenous psychological experiences and ways of knowing.

In the interest of bridging the gap between contemporary forms of therapy and traditional non-Western indigenous healing, Derald Wing Sue and David Sue propose the following 7 guidelines for Western-trained therapists in dealing with clients of non-Western and indigenous cultures:

1. Do not invalidate the indigenous belief systems of your culturally diverse clients.
2. Become knowledgeable about indigenous beliefs and healing practices.
3. Realize that learning about indigenous healing and beliefs entails experiential and lived realities.
4. Avoid overpathologizing and underpathologizing a culturally diverse client's problems.
5. Be willing to consult with traditional healers or make use of their services.
6. Recognize that spirituality is an intimate aspect of the human condition and a legitimate aspect of mental health work.
7. Be willing to expand your definition of the helping role to community work and involvement.

Another important contributor to Native American indigenous psychology, was Rupert Ross. Although in Canada, Ross' efforts remain relevant to many Native American cultures, especially in Alaska. Ross who, while working as a Crown Attorney with First Nations went beyond the confines of the current criminal justice system to explore the aboriginal people who were forced to adhere to it.

Ross found physiological and psychological differences that prevented aboriginal people proper justice. The ethics of non-interference, that anger not be shown, respecting praise and gratitude, the conservation-withdrawal tactic, and the notion that the time must be right were rules that guided traditional time. Although assimilating to a degree, Ross suggested that perhaps there were areas of knowledge from them that our nation could learn from. Even the western scientific method of studying cause of effect differed, as the First Nation believed that humans should not give cause, hence should have no effect on their environment. Ross wrote two books on the subject, entitled Dancing With a Ghost: Exploring Aboriginal Reality and Returning to the Teaching: Exploring Aboriginal Justice.

=== Latin American psychology ===
The Latin American Community has been attempting to rectify their current status, even if it has been a challenge for the professionals in the field of psychology in Latin America.

Fortunately, recent developments in social issues such as population control, economic development, community psychology ... national psychology ... and child development ... Applied interventions will ultimately be enhanced from these and other lines of research, providing a more systematic method for addressing the affective, behavioral and cognitive psychological systems of member of a particular culture.

In the areas that are often looked upon as being problematic for individuals and the Latin American societies, there has been progress in research. It does help some, for American psychologists to continue these studies in America as well. The demographics may be different, however many cultural aspects continue to affect the Latin American population in America today. Those issues are in need of elaboration. Latin America has come a long way when it comes to indigenous psychologies because they basically had to jump through loopholes when they faced democracy. They have experienced people who worked in the field that were killed because of what they were studying, which is psychology. Along with the hardship of losing their teachers they didn't have funding when they needed it to expand. By working together, people of Latin America can make it happen by sticking together and get this field of study back up on its feet again.

"Latin American psychology has developed as a profession faster than it has as a science." In Latin America there is a high social demand for professional psychologists which is what has helped fuel the need for psychology. Research is especially needed in Latin America because of the constant changing of their social and economic conditions. Research in Latin America has recently become implemented in order to help with population control, economic development, and community psychology (Freire, 1970). Liberation psychology which came about in the 19th century was the original attempt to focus on issues such as overcrowding, land reform, and violence. Martin-Baro defined liberation psychology as "a paradigm in which theories don’t define the problems of the situation; rather, the problems demand or select their own theorization" (Martin-Baro, 1989). Many countries have since taken on this theory and thus created all of the unique indigenous psychologies.

=== Indian-Asian psychology ===
Indian-Asian psychology, like South African and Latin American psychology, suffers "from a lack of resources stemming from the political and economic instability of both [India and Asia]". Though it is true that Indian and Asian (especially Chinese) psychologies were initially very influenced by European and American psychology, local "social, religious, and philosophical pressures and beliefs" have since affected the psychology of the region in huge ways.

Formal institutions both cultivated and oppressed psychology in the India-Asia region. Turbulent and shaky are good words to describe the political atmosphere that these regions endured, which of course was reflected in the field of psychology. The "lack of intellectual infrastructure as a result of scarce financial resources" was most certainly felt by specific areas, which in turn led to "impoverished sociocultural context and centralized government control of resources".

What can be said for psychology in the region is persistence. Even though there are twenty four native languages (each one having various dialects), and even though psychology has only been in the formal academic setting since the early twentieth century when Western psychology entered Calcutta, forward progress has nonetheless been made. Although the "region has neither an accreditation nor licensing system for psychology programs and practicing psychologist", there are positive shifts occurring.

This shift can be seen in the relationship between applied psychology and research psychology. Thankfully, the shift from strictly applied professional psychology to scientific research psychology has begun to gain force. It is also important to recognize the shift that has taken place between Western psychology and Indian-Asian psychology. Currently many with "formal Western training have molded their instruction to better fit their culture, thereby integrating cultural and traditional components into their practices". Out of this, three different strand of psychology have developed that are specific to this particular region. They are general psychology, country- and region-specific psychology, and native-based weltanschauung psychology. Indian-Asian people have had very strong ties to their culture and what is going on in their countries. They tend to look at how they have been doing things for many centuries and using it in all the different types of studies. Psychology is no different because they still look to their friends and family for input and advice on what needs to happen. They are very strong in their countries.

=== South African psychology ===
According to Robert B. Lawson, Jean E. Graham, and Kristin M. Baker, psychology has been strongly influenced by the nation's political turmoil, particularly over the past sixty years. Colonial, apartheid, capitalist, and patriarchal forces all influenced South African psychology, resulting in the formation of a psychology faced with adversity; the apartheid period intentionally neglected and isolated the field of psychology so that when South Africa first held democratic elections in the mid-1990s, the problems facing psychology as a science and profession were merely beginning to surface.

South African psychology during the apartheid period was dominated by political influences, such as selective economic sanctions, segregation, and people being exiled from their native land; the influences of the apartheid period resulted in a grossly underdeveloped psychological field at the time of the fall of the apartheid. With approximately 5,000 psychologists for a population of over forty-three million people, practicing clinical psychologists greatly outnumber research psychologists, leaving few South African psychologists capable of crafting broad-scale psychological interventions. Today, vast efforts are being made to extend South African psychology beyond its borders, which is mostly due to the apartheid no longer isolating the field form international scholarship.

The first steps for South African psychology in the aftermath of apartheid were to take a more collectivist orientation, indigenous focus, rigorous scholarship, and international exchange. South African psychologists face the dilemma of keeping international influence and indigenous psychology in balance with South African perspectives; South Africa is in desperate need of psychologists that are willing and able to assist in overcoming the aftermath of apartheid, especially with issues such as violence, poverty, racism, and HIV/AIDS.

While the resources available to South African psychologists are limited due to past apartheid constraints, measures are being taken to expand the number of psychologists trained to be basic researchers and field clinical psychologists. Psychologists in South Africa race to respond to the social pressures and constraints placed on the field in the apartheid aftermath and there are now multiple efforts underway to develop South African psychology as both a profession and a science.

=== South Africa, the apartheid system, and its effects on psychology ===
With the apartheid system that was established in South Africa major turmoil was caused amongst native and non-native South Africans. The apartheid system was based on laws of segregation, which grew in severity as time passed. Some of the first segregation laws that were established did not allow for whites and "non-whites" to interact with each other. Even if these interactions wanted, whites and blacks were not allowed to marry or engage socially. In addition to this, "white jobs" and "black jobs" were established which also created segregation in the workplace. As apartheid progressed into its final stages, black South African citizens were no longer able to live in South Africa; they were sent back to African homelands causing them to lose their citizenship and be exiled. Around 1990 the anti-apartheid era began, which helped to reintegrate blacks into the South African society. After receiving pressure from the United States and Great Britain, the apartheid system that once ruled South Africa started to become undone. The Interim Constitution of 1993 enabled South Africa to hold democratic elections in 1994. The Constitution of South Africa 1996 fully ended apartheid.

While the apartheid system was still in place, South African psychology became extremely underdeveloped due to political power controlling everything in this society. There is little diversity amongst psychologists in South Africa. A majority of practicing psychologists was white, most of them practiced clinical psychology, rather than focusing on research. With the apartheid system abolished and a new democratic system in place, the education of psychology is being revamped improving the field greatly. More efforts are being made to encourage South Africans, especially blacks, to join the research field of psychology.

At the same time, academic isolation during the apartheid era also engendered the development of indigenous psychological approaches, like SHIP® (Spontaneous Healing Intra-systemic Process), a genuinely South African psychotherapeutic method registered with the Health Professions Council of South Africa (HPCSA). The SHIP® focus lies on the spontaneous healing of trauma and defines presenting chronic dis-eases as activated healing and precursors to growth. The SHIP® Foundations trains psychologists since 2001.

=== Filipino psychology ===
The Philippine experience has proven that approaching psychology using Western models cannot incorporate the intricacies of Asian cultures. In addition, while many commentators have thought of Filipino psychology as a branch of Asian psychology, there is a continuing discussion on what comprise the subject. This will determine whether Filipino psychology is to be placed under the domain of either Asian psychology or Eastern psychology.

Filipino psychology is seen as largely postcolonial and is seen as a kind of liberation psychology, aiming to be familiar with the psychology of subjugated communities by conceptually addressing the oppressive sociopolitical structure in which they exist. The approaches (Filipino: lapit) in Filipino psychology are different from that of the West. In Filipino psychology, the subjects are treated as active participants to the research undertaking, called kalahok, who are considered as equal in status to the researcher. The participants are included in the research as a group, and not as individuals - hence, an umpukan, or natural cluster, is required to serve as the participants, per se. The researcher, who merely acts as a facilitator, is introduced to the umpukan by a tulay ('bridge'), who is also a part of the umpukan and is an esteemed member of the community being studied.

== Real life application ==
Cultural views, theories and assumptions within social institutions influence cultures around the world through the application of psychological practices on indigenous populations. The historic, cultural and religious beliefs specific to each population directly affect the application of such psychologies. The specific beliefs of indigenous people must be considered in order to bridge the barrier between psychological ideas and the real world application of these ideas on indigenous people. An excerpt from an article on the American Psychological Association's web site explains this idea and shows how connecting psychology with cultural beliefs can strengthen a doctor patient relationship:

Delhi psychologist Aruna Broota, PhD, doesn't let her doctoral training at an American university stand in the way of using Indian folk beliefs in her work. The importance of such beliefs were evident in a recent case in which one of Broota's patients beat his wife. Broota's probing revealed that the husband was angry at his wife for disobeying her mother-in-law by having her child immunized on a day the mother-in-law considered inauspicious. Broota's analysis? The women should have placed a small black mark behind the child's ear to protect him from evil. "Pardon my saying so, but if there was a white therapist, he would try to be 'rational,'" says Broota, a psychology professor at the University of Delhi and editor of the Journal of Research and Applications in Clinical Psychology. "Whereas in India, we try to look into the belief system of the client. I was being ancient as well as modern to create peace in the house"

— Clay, 2002

== DSM & western diagnostic hegemony ==
In addition to the broader dimensions of western colonial and cultural influence on indigenous psychologies, there are specific limitations for indigenous psychologies that arise from the pervasive (nearly universal) acceptance of western diagnostic tools as the primary source of diagnostic features/criteria for psychopathology. The American Psychiatric Association's Diagnostic and Statistical Manual of Mental Disorders (DSM) continues to be used as an overarching framework for mental illness across cultures, and may suppress or distort indigenous understandings of mental illness of psychopathological processes. By virtue of its culture-specific origin and oversight, the DSM is culturally bound within western ontological paradigms, and thus may not be, in whole or in part, appropriate for the diverse needs of other cultures.

It is possible, and imperative, that indigenous psychologies find meaningful points of integration with western psychologies, and may include the systematic operationalization of mental illness within rigorous diagnostic criteria. However, integration towards a global psychology, or other overarching cross-cultural framework of psychological phenomena transcendent of specific cultural ontologies may require the inclusion of paradigms and methodologies that exist apart from traditional western-scientific understandings of rigor. Moreover, diagnostic criteria will remain an important point of conversation and controversy for global psychology, as it jeopardizes the basic ability of researchers to generalize and categorize the prevalence/incidence of mental illness in a global context.
