= Utang na loob =

Filipino cultural trait

Utang na loob (Bisayan: utang kabubut-un) is a Filipino cultural trait which, when translated literally, means "a debt of one's inner self (loob)".

Charles Kaut translated the term in 1961 as a "debt of gratitude", while Tomas Andres took his cue from Kaut when he translated it in 1994 as "reciprocity", but Virgilio Enriquez suggests a more accurate translation in combining the concepts of "gratitude/solidarity". Pe Pua and Marcelino point out that utang na loob does not imply the sense of "burden" inherent to Kaut and Andres' translations.

In the study of Filipino psychology, utang na loob is considered an important "accommodative surface value", along with hiya (propriety/dignity) and pakikisama (companionship/esteem). It is one of the values by which Filipinos accommodate the demands of the world around them as opposed to its counterpart grouping, referred to as the "confrontative surface values", which include values such as lakas ng loob and pakikibaka.

The essence of utang na loob is an obligation to appropriately repay a person who has done one a favor. The favors which elicit the Filipino's sense of utang na loob are typically those whose value is impossible to quantify, or, if there is a quantifiable value involved, involves a deeply personal internal dimension. This internal dimension, loob, differentiates utang na loob from an ordinary utang (debt); being an internal phenomenon, utang na loob thus goes much deeper than ordinary debt or even the western concept of owing a favor. Filipino psychology explains that this is a reflection of the kapwa orientation of shared personhood or shared self, which is at the core of the Filipino values system.
