= Filipino psychology =

Philosophical school of the Philippines

Filipino psychology, or Sikolohiyang Pilipino in Filipino, is defined as the psychological and philosophical school rooted on the experience, ideas, and cultural orientation of Filipinos. It was formalized in 1975 by the Pambansang Samahan sa Sikolohiyang Pilipino (National Association for Filipino Psychology). It focuses on various themes such as identity and national consciousness, social awareness, and involvement, and it uses indigenous psychology to apply to various fields such as religion, mass media, and health.

Sikolohiyang Pilipino is built on the idea that psychological knowledge can be derived from the culture. It also believes that foreign theories should not be completely abandoned. According to Luis Enriquez, Sikolohiyang Pilipino does not advocate for the removal of foreign ideas from the field of psychology.

In 1978, Enriquez proposed two processes that can be used to indigenize knowledge: indigenization from within and indigenization from without. Indigenization from without involves searching for local equivalents for commonly used psychological concepts. Indigenization from within is a process in which the knowledge and methods related to psychology are derived from the local culture. In the Philippines, Sikolohiyang Pilipino has been working on the concept of cultural revalidation. The process formalizes the knowledge base and the local culture as its source.

== History ==
Filipino Psychology emerged and grew as part of the nationalist indigenization movement in the Philippines that was formalized in 1975.

The roots of Filipino Psychology can be traced back to the introduction of the American education system in the Philippines. Agustin Alonzo was among the first Filipino psychologists to return from their education in America (in 1925) to teach at the College of Education in the University of the Philippines, Manila. This team brought with them psychological knowledge rooted in the American tradition of psychology. Western psychology is taught in schools as universal and scientific despite being generally considered by some as insensitive and inappropriate to Philippine culture. This hegemony of Western American Psychology is referred to as Colonial Psychology.

During the 1960s, many Filipino intellectuals and scholars were already aware of the limitations and incompatibility of Western Psychology; western-oriented approaches in research in particular, had led scholars to paint the Filipino through the "judgmental and impressionistic views of the colonizers." It is with the use of American categories and standards that "the native Filipino invariably suffers from the comparison in not too subtle attempts to put forward Western behavior patterns as models for the Filipino." Early efforts to correct the traditional way of teaching and studying psychology in the 1960s include the translation of foreign materials and the use of the Filipino language as a mode of instruction, however, these efforts fail to address the problems brought about by colonial psychology as these efforts were sparse and not collaborated upon by psychologists.

It was only in the 1970s that a concerted effort to address colonial psychology in the form of Filipino Psychology took place. Filipino Psychology, along with advances in Filipinology and similarly History's Pantayong Pananaw, was led by three professors from the University of the Philippines Diliman: Virgilio Enriquez, Prospero Covar, and Zeus A. Salazar in the indigenization movement of their respective fields.

Enriquez returned from his studies to the Philippines in 1971, and established the Philippine Psychology Research House (now Philippine Psychology Research and Training House, PPRTH). In 1975, the very first annual national conference on Filipino Psychology was held by the Pambansang Samahan sa Sikolohiyang Pilipino (PSSP) marking the formalization of Filipino Psychology.

== Basic orientation and context ==
Filipino Psychology is described as largely postcolonial and as a liberation psychology. There are even some who had even argued that it is a local variant of Critical Psychology since it served as an emancipatory social science since it aims to decolonize academic neocolonialism.

Filipino psychology is usually thought of as a branch of Asian psychology, the placement, determined primarily on culture. However, there is an ongoing debate on the make-up of Philippine culture, because this will generally determine whether Philippine Psychology is to be placed under the realms of either Asian psychology or Eastern psychology.

== Historical Threads of Philippine Psychological Thought ==
In 1985, historian Zeus A. Salazar identified four different traditions upon which Philippine psychology can be traced:

- Academic Scientific Psychology or Akademiko-siyentipikal na Sikolohiya: This follows the American-oriented psychological tradition that can be traced back to Wilhelm Wundt in 1876. It was introduced in the Philippines through formal American education system in universities.
- Academic Philosophic Psychology or Akademiko-pilosopiya na Sikolohiya: This was started by priest-professors at the University of Santo Tomas during the 17th century Spanish era. This tradition originally came from the writings of the preachers and friars in philosophy and "pre-scientific" Spanish elites and would later join with the American-oriented scientific psychology.
- Ethnic Psychology or Taal na Sikolohiya: this is the Philippine indigenous psychology in the sense that this includes the frame of psychological reasoning, enculturation practices, beliefs, and proto-clinical practices that can be culled from language, literature, myths, legends, etc. This also includes psychological systems worked out by Filipinos with Filipino indigenous elements as basis (e.g. Hermano Pule, José Rizal, Isabelo de los Reyes, Teodoro Kalaw, etc.) and Sikolohiya ng mga Pilipino (Psychology of the Filipino) as formulated by Virgilio Enriquez.
- Psycho-medical Systems or Siko-medikal na mga Sistema: A psychological tradition that is closely related to ethnic psychology. The psycho-medical tradition that has religion as the basis and explanation. This includes the faith healing practices of the babaylan and the katalonan. According to Salazar, he believes that "no real healing could take place if there were no common ideology or frame of reference... understood and accepted by both healer and patient."

== Basic tenets ==
=== Core value or Kapwa (shared inner self) ===
Kapwa is the core construct of Filipino Psychology. Kapwa has two categories, Ibang Tao and Hindi Ibang Tao.

- Ibang Tao ("outsider") There are five interaction levels under this category:
  - Pakikitungo: civility – right behavior meant right demeanor towards authorities (Parents, Elders, etc.).
  - Pakikisalamuha: act of mixing – This is a social value that is primarily communitarian. It espouses the ability to adapt.
  - Pakikilahok: act of joining – This translates to participation of the entire community to help a person.
  - Pakikibagay: conformity – This runs into conflict with individuality which many Filipinos in fact willingly throw away in favor of conformity with demands of those who are in charge.
  - Pakikisama: being united with the group.
- Hindi Ibang Tao ("one-of-us") There are three interaction levels under this category:
  - Pakikipagpalagayang-loob: it is the act of mutual trust
  - Pakikisangkot: act of joining others
  - Pakikipagkaisa: being one with others

=== Pivotal interpersonal value ===
- Pakiramdam: Shared inner perceptions. Filipinos use damdam, or the inner perception of others' emotions, as a basic tool to guide their dealings with other people.

=== Linking socio-personal value ===
- Kagandahang-Loob: Shared humanity. This refers to being able to help other people in dire need due to a perception of being together as a part of one Filipino humanity.

=== Accommodative surface values ===
- Hiya: Loosely translated as 'shyness' by most Western psychologists, Hiya is actually 'sense of propriety'.
- Utang na loob: Norm of reciprocity. Filipinos are expected by their neighbors to return favors—whether these were asked for or not—when it is needed or wanted.
- Pakikisama and Pakikipagkapwa: Smooth Interpersonal Relationship, or SIR, as coined by Lynch (1961 and 1973). This attitude is primarily guided by conformity with the majority.

=== Confrontative surface values ===
- Bahala na: it is translated as "determination in the face of uncertainty" and is used as an expression, almost universally, in Filipino culture. American psychologist Bostrom describes that Filipinos engage in the bahala na attitude equivalent to American fatalism and escapism. Contrary to the connotation of passive fatalism and escapism suggested by Bostrom, "bahala na" would be a confrontative attitude. It is risk-taking in the face of the proverbial cloud of uncertainty, and the possibility of failure. It is also about an indication of an acceptance of the nature of things, including the inherent limitations of one's self.
- Lakas ng loob: This attitude is characterized by being courageous in the midst of problems and uncertainties.
- Pakikibaka: Literally in English, it means concurrent clashes. It refers to the ability of the Filipino to undertake revolutions and uprisings against a common enemy.

=== Societal values ===
- Karangalan: Loosely translated to dignity, this actually refers to what other people see in a person and how they use that information to make a stand or judge about his/her worth.
  - Puri: the external aspect of dignity. May refer to how other people judge a person of his/her worth. This compels a common Filipino to conform to social norms, regardless how obsolete they are.
  - Dangal: the internal aspect of dignity. May refer to how a person judges his own worth.
- Katarungan: Loosely translated to justice, this actually refers to equity in giving rewards to a person.
- Kalayaan: Freedom and mobility. Ironically, this may clash with the less important value of pakikisama or pakikibagay (conformity).

== Approaches and methods ==
Approaches, or lapit, and methods, or pamamaraan, in Filipino Psychology are different from that of Western Psychology. In Filipino Psychology, the subjects, or participants, called kalahok, are considered as equal in status to the researcher.

The participants are included in the research as a group, and not as individuals – hence, an umpukan, or natural cluster, is required to serve as the participants, per se. The researcher is introduced to a natural cluster by a tulay (bridge), who is a part of the umpukan and is a well-respected man in the community.

Some of the approaches and methods used in Filipino Psychology are:

- Pakikipagkuwentuhan: In this method, the researcher engages in a story-telling with an umpukan. The researcher merely serves as the facilitator, while the kalahok or participants are the one who are to talk. The term kwento, from the Spanish word cuento, literally means 'to tell a story'.
- Panunuluyan: In this method, the researcher stays in the home of his kalahok or participant while he conducts the research with consent by the host family, whose head serves as the tulay to an umpukan. The term tuloy, which is the root word of the term panunuluyan, literally means 'to go in'.
- Pagdadalaw-dalaw: In this method, the researcher occasionally visits the house of his host or tulay, as opposed to staying in the house. The term dalaw literally means 'visit'.
- Pagtatanung-tanong: In this method, the researcher undergoes a kind of questioning session with his kalahok or participants. In this method, however, 'lead questions' (those questions which directly refer to the topic being studied) are not supposed to be asked, instead the questions to be asked are supposed to have been derived from the kalahok's answers themselves. The word tanong literally means 'question'.
- Pakikiramdam: In this approach, the researcher uses entirely his/her own feelings or emotions to justify if his participants or kalahok are ready to be part of his research or not. The term damdam literally means 'inner perception of emotions'.

== Psychopathology ==
Filipino psychopathology, or sikopatolohiya in Filipino, from Spanish psicopatologia, is the study of abnormal psychology in the Filipino context. Several mental disorders have been identified that culture-bound syndromes, and can therefore be found only in the Philippines or in other societies with which Filipinos share cultural connections. Examples of such are:

- Amok: Malayan mood disorder, more aptly called "Austronesian Mood Disorder", in which a person suddenly loses control of himself and goes into a killing frenzy, after which he/she hallucinates and falls into a trance. After he/she wakes up, he has absolutely no memory of the event.
- Bangungot: A relatively common occurrence in which a person suddenly loses control of his respiration and digestion, and falls into a coma and ultimately to death. The person is believed to dream of falling into a deep abyss at the onset of his death. This syndrome has been repeatedly linked to Thailand's Brugada syndrome and to the ingestion of rice. However, no such medical ties have been proven.

=== Manifestation of universal mental disorders ===
Filipino psychopathology also refers to the different manifestations of mental disorders in Filipino people. One example of such is the manifestation of depression and schizophrenia in Filipinos, which are, for the most part, less violent.

== Organizations ==
- Pambansang Samahan sa Sikolohiyang Pilipino (National Society for Filipino Psychology)
- Bukluran sa Sikolohiyang Pilipino (Union of Filipino Psychology)
- TATSULOK – Alyansa ng mga Mag-aaral sa Sikolohiyang Pilipino (TATSULOK – Alliance of Students of Filipino Psychology)

== See also ==
- Asian psychology
- Indigenous psychology
- Filipino values
- Women in the Philippines
- Loob
- Mental health care in the Philippines
