= Loob =

Element in Philippine belief of internal identity

In Philippine culture, loob or kalooban refers to one's inner self, or, more specifically, to the internal dimension of a person's identity. Its external counterpart is labas – the physical, outward appearance. Loob is a core concept in Filipino Psychology, a field which is unthinkable without both the internal and external dimensions, "loob"/"labas".

Loob or kalooban has been compared to similar concepts in other Southeast Asian and Oceanian cultures, such as the Indonesian concept of batin or kebatinan.

== Loob as a psycho-moral reality: Katauhan at Pagkatao ==
"Walang sarili kung walang loob."

According to a publication by Dionisio M. Miranda entitled Loob--The Filipino Within, Loob can be viewed as a psycho-moral reality. This part of the publication says that Loob is made of two more concepts, and these are katauhan and pagkatao.

From this, katauhan and pagkatao seem like similar concepts, but they translate to personality and character, respectively, which are often used interchangeably but are two very different things.

Personality (psychological), according to Loob as a psycho-moral reality, embodies the traits, attitudes or habits that distinguish one individual from another. It is the complex or one's behavioral and emotional tendencies. It is not just the structure or the organization of these qualities, but it is the whole of these qualities that gives form and meaning to an individual and his existence.

It is more or less static in the way that it is the basic or initial particularity of a person, what makes him different from everyone else. It could eventually be viewed from static to dynamic (changing) terms.

Moral character, on the other hand, is understood to be mainly dynamic and secondarily static. It is related to personality in the sense that character is based on personality and is initially determined by it. In the concrete sense, character is the aspect which constitutes one's ethnicity which structures him not only as subject (ako) but further as a moral subject and moral agent.

Content-wise, it is the values and attitudes, principles and norms, ideals and projects that lend the person his moral form (kaloobang makatao). In the generic sense, it responds to perceptions of realities of good and evil, right and wrong, appropriate and inappropriate and so on.

Personality as Katauhan, Character as Pagkatao

The core of both personality and character is the ego or the self. Sarili (self) manifests itself either as personality or as character.

=== Loob as Katauhan (Personality) ===
- Makes us distinct/unique from others
- Static

Under Katauhan are the following distinctive constituents:

==== Malay (Awareness, Consciousness) ====
- One needs to be active; "awareness is not awareness unless it is active"
  - Malay/Awareness about the environment/external aspects and about yourself
  - Pagbabalik-loob (returning to one's true self)

==== Dama (Could be internal or external) ====
- Sensitivity to your surroundings
- This is the most visible form of Katauhan
  - Emotions (specific and objective)
  - Sensations
  - Desire (combination of both)

==== Ugali (Behavior, Tendency, Habit) ====
- As biological (predisposition; habit)
- As will (goals, instincts; how you act)
- As how one decides/decision making (action, will)

=== Loob as Pagkatao (Character) ===
- More on one's moral aspect
- Dynamic not real

Under Pagkatao are the following distinctive constituents:

==== Isip (Mind, Thinking, Sense) ====
- As thoughts, content of consciousness, awareness (malay)
- As intelligence (talino), wisdom (karunungan)
- As reasoning (katuwiran)
  - Intelligence, skill, critically analyze (logic)
  - faithful to what they know to be true, reality (katotohanan)
- As one's affirmation/stand (paninindigan) – action of one's thoughts; there is a moral aspect to these actions
  - Beliefs, principles

==== Bait (Goodness – Intrinsic, Critical, Practical) ====
- Intrinsic, innate (everyone has goodness within themselves)
- Intuitive (in Isip, the discrimination of goodness occurs discursively)
  - The language consistently associates bait with the more positive emotions and sentiments.
  - Knowing what is acceptable and what is not.
  - This kind of bait may initially characterize the katauhan of the self (sarili) for example, as a kind of natural endowment. In being consistent with the self (sarili) over time, this defines the pagkatao (character) of a person. In other words, "bait must not remain merely natural; it must also become personal."
- Practical
  - There are "levels" of bait (ex. kulang sa bait (lacking in common sense), nasiraan ng bait (mad, crazed, psychotic) etc.)
  - There is actually a "set" amount of bait (it should be just right; no more, no less)

==== Kalooban ====
- Right or wrong (tama o mali; moral will)
  - Kusa (indicative moral will) refers to both purpose and intention.
  - Sadya (moral imperative) where the ought that is presented is a value for the person himself (when an object is encountered as a force, therefore imperative) either as something that is already part of his nature or something needed to perfect it.
  - Pasiya (moral decisions of the will) is that which takes a clear and concrete stand for or against such options (characteristic choices). Kalooban as decisive will looks similar to isip as paninindigan. However, isip is more theoretical and generic; kalooban is more practical and concrete.

== Concepts whose expression involves "loob" ==
The word Loob, simply taken as 'inside' and not a construct, is also used for "looban," which means an interior compound, or community; and for the term "manloloob", which means 'robber', literally 'someone who enters'.

As a core concept of value, Loob and its variants are a critical aspect of numerous Filipino value constructs, of which the following are examples:

Concept	Definition	Literal Meaning
Utang na loob	Debt of gratitude	'Borrowed inner self'
May utang na loob	A good person, a person who understands what it means to owe a debt of gratitude	'With an inner debt'
Nakikingutang ng loob	To seek a favor from someone	'To borrow one's inner self'
Ipagkaloob	To entrust	'To put inside someone's inner self'
Lagay ng loob	Mood, one's state of mind or feeling	'State of the inner self'
Lakas-loob	Courage	'Inner force'
Tibay ng loob	Inner strength, resilience	'Durability/strength of the inner self'
Tining ng loob	Clarity of thinking, feeling, volition	'Calm of the inner self'
Kababaang loob	Humility	'Lowness of the inner self'
Kabutihang-loob	Good naturedness	'Inner goodness/kindness'
Kagandahang loob	Generosity, noblemindedness	'Inner beauty'
May kusang-loob	One who does his work without prodding	'With inner direction/volition'
Payapang loob	A calm person, to be at peace, to accept	'Inner peace'
Mapagkaloob	A generous person	'One who shares his inner self'
Mahina ang loob	A coward	'Weak inner self'
Malakas ang loob	A daring person, can be positive (to be courageous) or negative (the phrase Ang lakas ng loob mo! is often synonymous with the English rebuke 'How dare you!')	'Strong inner self'
Malamig ang loob	An indifferent person	'Coldness of the inner self'
Pikit ang loob	One who is blind to injustice	'Closed inner self', 'Shut from the inside'
Mabigat ang loob	The state of being sad, heavy-hearted	'Heaviness of the inner self'
Maluwag sa loob	A state of being willing, cheerfully ready	'Loose from the inside', 'Inner openness'
Wala sa loob	A state of being unwilling	'Not to have it in oneself'
Tapat na kalooban	Sincerity, loyalty, trustworthiness	'Truth of the inner self'
Masasamang-loob	Criminals	'Those with bad inner beings'
Kapalagayang loob	Confidante, intimate	'One you would entrust your inner self with'
Pampalubag-loob	Consolation	'Salve for the inner self'
Kagaanang-loob	Grace, something to pacify intense emotion such as anger	'Lightness/Lifting of the inner self'
Saloobin	One's inner thought or inner feelings, attitude	'The entirety of the inner self'
Masama ang loob	To hold a grudge, to be angry with	'Feel bad inside', 'Sickness of the inner self'

== See also ==
- Culture of the Philippines
- Filipino Psychology
