= Asian American Journal of Psychology =

- Discipline: Psychology
- Language: English
- Edited by: Bryan S. K. Kim (Outgoing), Chu Y. Kim-Prieto (Incoming)

Publication details
- History: 2009-present
- Publisher: American Psychological Association (USA)
- Frequency: Quarterly
- Impact factor: 1.547 (2020)

Standard abbreviations
- ISO 4: Asian Am. J. Psychol.

Indexing
- ISSN: 1948-1985 (print); 1948-1993 (web)

Links
- Journal homepage; Online access

The Asian American Journal of Psychology is a peer-reviewed academic journal published by the American Psychological Association on behalf of the Asian American Psychological Association. The journal "is dedicated to research, practice, advocacy, education, and policy within Asian American psychology." The editor-in-chief is Bryan S. K. Kim (University of Hawaii at Hilo).

== Abstracting and Indexing ==
According to the Journal Citation Reports, the journal has a 2020 impact factor of 1.547.
