= Leon Guerrero =

Leon Guerrero may refer to:

- Lou Leon Guerrero (born 1950), governor of Guam since 2019
- Carlotta A. Leon Guerrero, Guamian journalist and politician
- Manuel Flores Leon Guerrero (1914–1985), governor of Guam from 1963 to 1969
- Lorenzo I. De Leon Guerrero (1935–2006), governor of the Northern Mariana Islands from 1990 to 1994
- Lourdes Santiago Torres Leon Guerrero (1921–2010), Guamian educator
- León María Guerrero (botanist) (1853–1935), Filipino botanist and revolutionary
- León María Guerrero (diplomat) (1915–1982), Filipino diplomat and novelist
