= Education in the Philippines during Spanish rule =

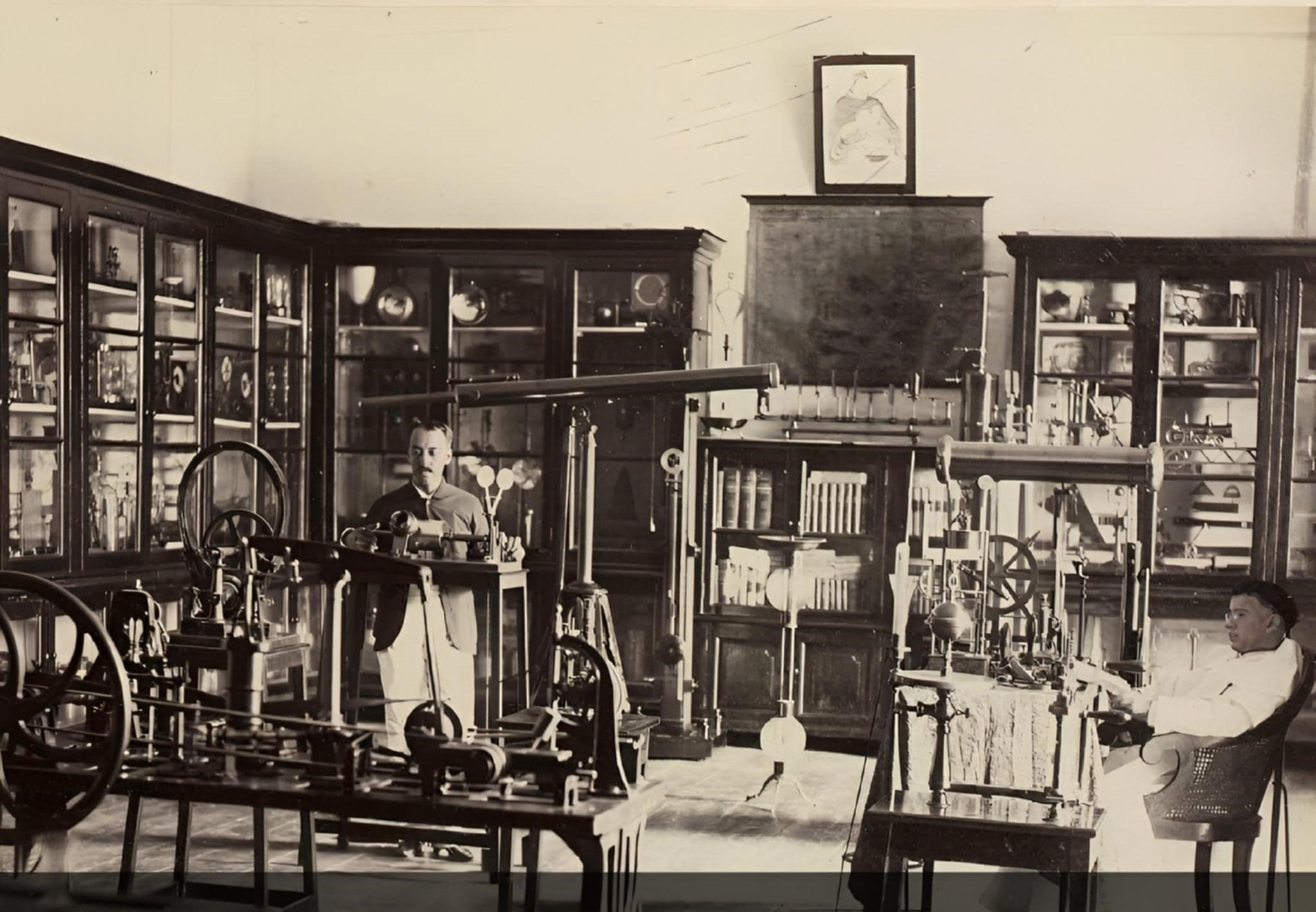
Physics Cabin University of Santo Tomas - Intramuros Natural history museum of University of Santo - Tomas IntramurosMain Courtyard University of Santo Tomas - IntramurosLibrary of the University of Santo Tomás in Manila, 1887. Created at the request of Archbishop Miguel de Benavides, O.P. of Manila in 1610, it is the oldest existing university in Asia. The library is also the oldest in the continent. It even had its own printing press which was brought from Europe.

During the Spanish colonial period in the Philippines (1565–1898), the different cultures of the archipelago experienced a gradual unification from a variety of native Asian and Islamic customs and traditions, including animist religious practices, to what is known today as Filipino culture, a unique hybrid of Southeast Asian and Western culture, namely Spanish, including the Spanish language and the Catholic faith.

Spanish education played a major role in that transformation in the Philippines. The oldest universities, colleges, and vocational schools, dating as far back as the late 16th century were created during the colonial period, as well as the first modern public education system in Asia, established in 1863. By the time Spain was replaced by the United States as the colonial power, Filipinos were among the most educated peoples in all of Asia and the Pacific, boasting one of the highest literacy rates in that continent. Simultaneously, the knowledge of Filipinos about neighboring cultures receded.

== The early period ==
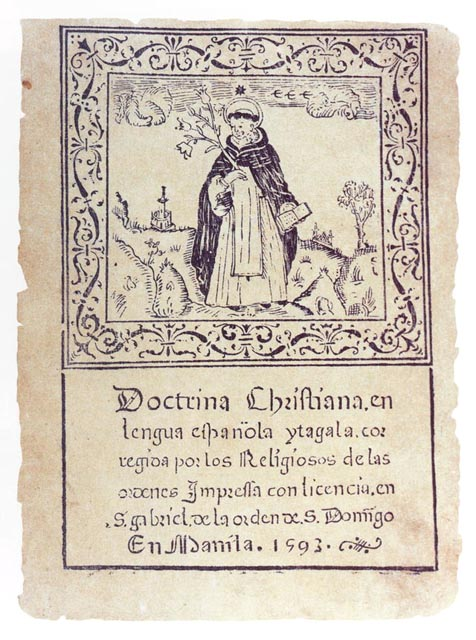
Cover of Doctrina Christiana

During the early years of Spanish colonization, education was mostly run by the Church. Spanish friars and missionaries educated the natives and converted indigenous populations to the Catholic faith.

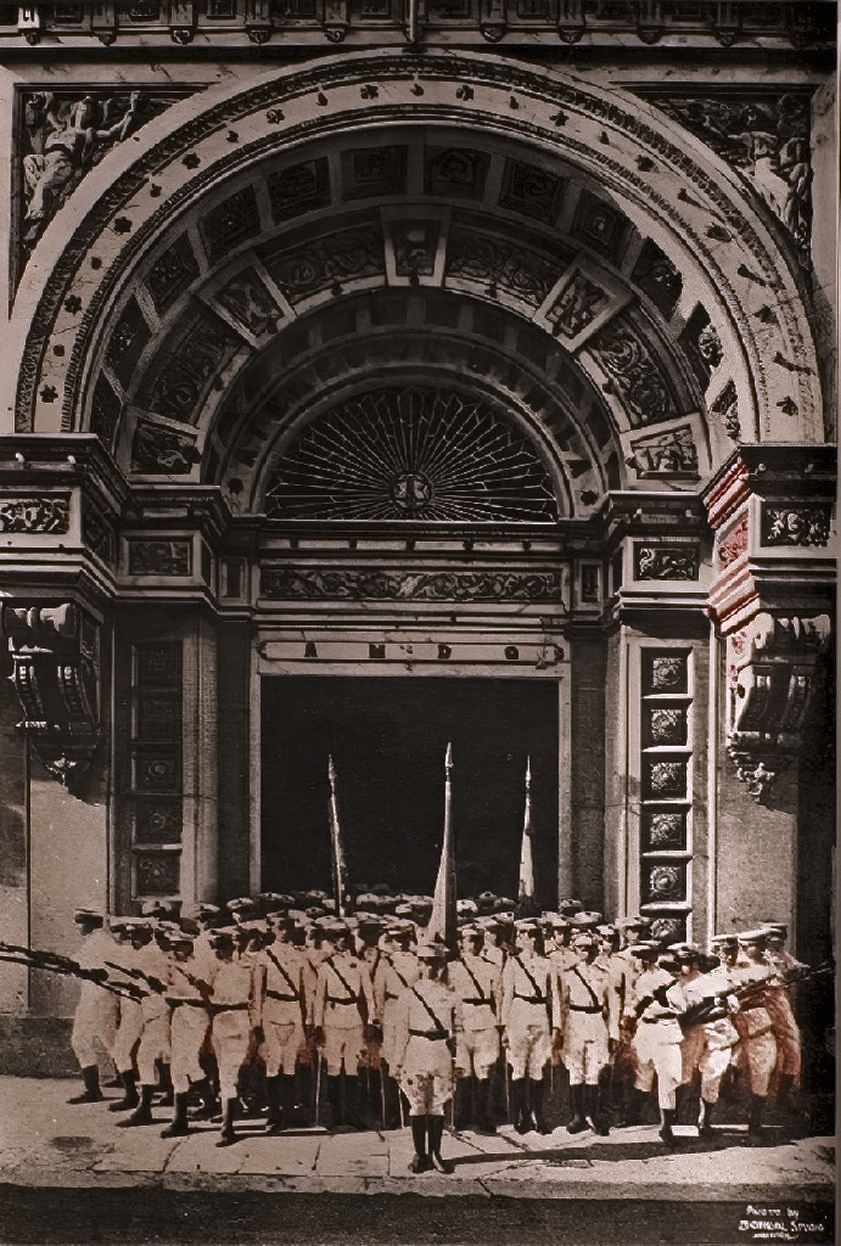
Students in Ateneo de Manila Entrance.

King Philip II's Leyes de Indias (Laws of the Indies) mandated Spanish authorities in the Philippines to educate the natives, to teach them how to read and write in the Spanish language. However, the latter objective was difficult given the realities of the time. The early friars learned the local languages to better communicate with the locals. In order to teach the Spanish language to the native population, the friars learned the local languages first, which also made possible the teaching of the Christian faith.

The Spanish missionaries established schools soon after reaching the islands and a few decades into the Spanish period, there was no Christian village without its school, with most children attending.

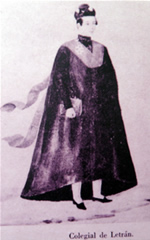
Saint Vicente Liem de la Paz as a student of Colegio de San Juan de Letran Manila.

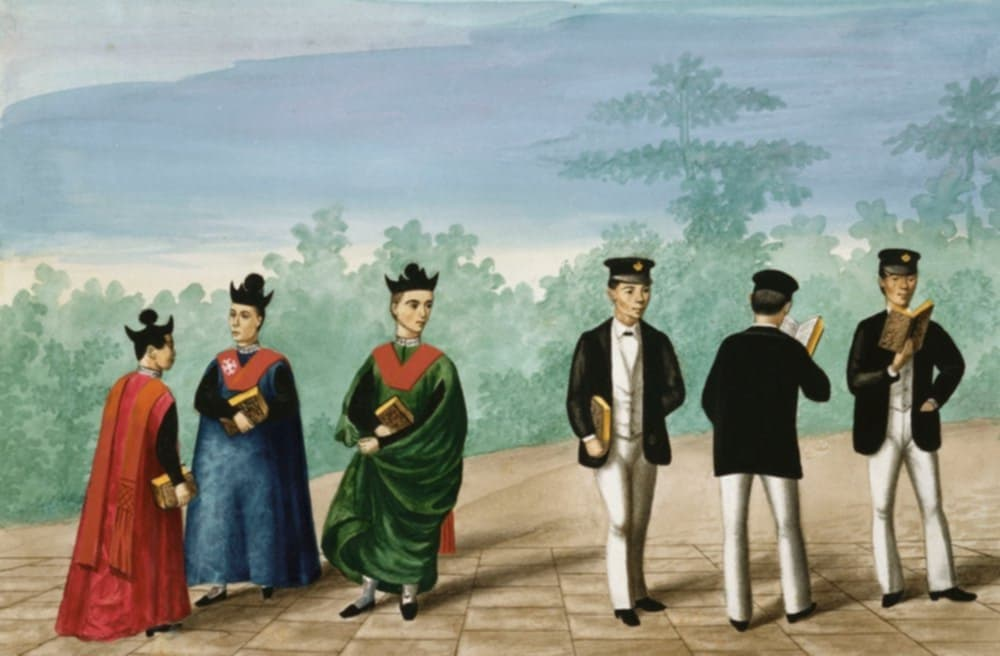
Manila and its Environs Students from Different Colleges 1800's

The Augustinians opened a school immediately upon arriving in Cebú in 1565. The Franciscans arrived in 1577, and they, too, immediately taught the people how to read and write, besides imparting to them important industrial and agricultural techniques. The Jesuits who arrived in 1581 also concentrated on teaching the young. When the Dominicans arrived in 1587, they did the same thing in their first mission in Bataan.

Within months of their arrival in Tigbauan which is in Iloilo province located in the island of Panay, Pedro Chirino and Francisco de Martín had established a school for Visayan boys in 1593 in which they taught not only the catechism but reading, writing, Spanish, and liturgical music. The Spaniards of Arévalo heard of the school and wanted Chirino to teach their boys too. Chirino at once put up a dormitory and school house (1593–1594) for the Spanish boys near his rectory. It was the first Jesuit boarding school to be established in the Philippines.

The Chinese language version of the Doctrina Christiana (Christian Doctrine) was the first book printed in the Philippines in about 1590 to 1592. A version in Spanish, and in Tagalog, in both Latin script and the commonly used Baybayin script of the Manila Tagalogs of the time was printed in 1593. The goal to teach the Christian faith to the literate population. Eventually, the Baybayin script was replaced by the Latin script, as this became increasingly more useful and widespread.

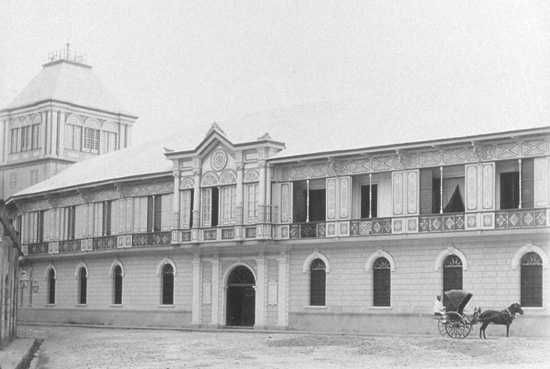
Colegio de San Juan de Letran, Manila (ca. 1880)

In 1610, Tomas Pinpin a Filipino printer, writer and publisher, who is sometimes referred as the "Patriarch of Filipino Printing", wrote his famous Librong Pagaaralan nang manga Tagalog nang Uicang Castilla, that was meant to help Filipinos learn the Spanish language. The prologue read:

Let us therefore study, my country men, for although the art of learning is somewhat difficult, yet if we are persevering, we shall soon improve our knowledge.

Other Tagalogs like us did not take a year to learn the Spanish language when using my book. This good result has given me satisfaction and encouraged me to print my work, so that all may derive some profit from it.

There were also Latin schools where that language was taught together with some Spanish, since it was a mandatory requirement for the study of philosophy, theology and jurisprudence in schools like the University of Santo Tomás, run by the Dominicans. The Philippine priests and lawyers of that time, with the exception of the sons and daughters of Spaniards, principales and criollos (Latin Americans), (Note: Villareal 2006, p. 9, "Ladinos, natives from the Philippines who were the informants, translators, or even better, consultants of the missionaries.") knew Latin perfectly well because the educational system was wholly religious.

The friars also opened many medical and pharmaceutical schools. The study of pharmacy consisted of a preparatory course with subjects in natural history and general chemistry and five years of studies in subjects such as pharmaceutical operations at the school of pharmacy. At the end of a 2-year period from commencement, the degree of Bachiller de Ciencia en Farmacía was granted.

By the end of the 16th century, several religious orders had established charity hospitals all over the archipelago and provided the bulk of this public service. These hospitals also became the setting for rudimentary scientific research work on pharmacy and medicine, focusing mostly on the problems of infectious tropical diseases. Several Spanish missionaries catalogued hundreds of Philippine plants with medicinal properties. The Manual de Medicinas Caseras..., written by Father Fernando de Santa María, first published in 1763, became so sought after that it was reprinted on several editions by 1885.

Colegio de Santa Potenciana was the first school and college for girls that opened in the Philippines, in 1589. It was followed by another school for women, Colegio de Santa Isabel, that opened in 1632. Other Schools and Colleges for girls were Santa Catalina, Santa Rosa, La Concordia, etc. Several religious congregations also established schools for orphaned girls who could not educate themselves.

== Tertiary schools ==
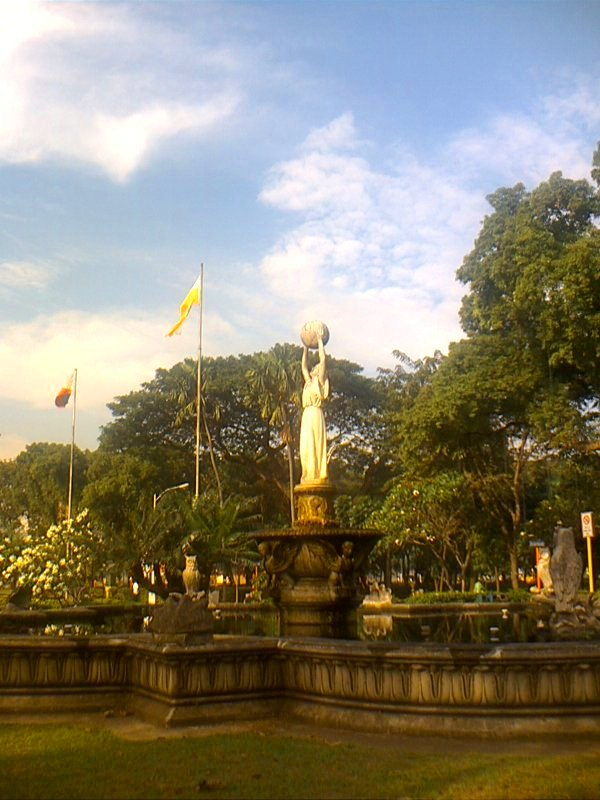
Fountain of Wisdom at the University of Santo Tomás

In 1590, the Universidad de San Ignacio was founded in Manila by the Jesuits, initially as the Colegio-Seminario de San Ignacio. By the second half of the 17th century, the university was incorporated as a mere College of Medicine and Pharmacy into the University of Santo Tomás.

The Colegio de San Ildefonso was established in 1595 in Cebú by the Society of Jesus.The school was forced to close in 1769 following a royal decree by King Charles III that expelled the Jesuits from Spanish colonies. The present-day University of San Carlos makes the claim of tracing its roots to the 16th century school. This claim has been disputed by the University of Santo Tomas that subject to numerous debates.

On April 28, 1611, the Universidad de Santo Tomás was founded in Manila, initially named as the Colegio de Nuestra Señora del Santísimo Rosario and later renamed as Colegio de Santo Tomas. (Note: The University of Santo Tomás is the oldest existing university in Asia from the University's own website.) On November 20, 1645, Pope Innocent X elevated it to University. King Charles III of Spain bestowed the title "Royal" in 1785, and Pope Leo XIII "Pontifical" in 1902. Pope Pius XII designated it as La Real y Pontificia Universidad de Santo Tomás de Aquino Universidad Católica de Filipinas (The Catholic University of the Philippines), in 1947.

In 1640, the Universidad de San Felipe de Austria was established in Manila. It was the first public university created by the Spanish government in the Philippines. It closed down in 1643.

The Jesuits also founded the Colegio de San José (1601) and took over the management of a school that became the Escuela Municipal (1859, later renamed Ateneo Municipal de Manila in 1865, now the Ateneo de Manila University). The Dominicans on their part had the Colegio de San Juan de Letrán (1620) in Manila. All of them provided courses leading to different prestigious degrees, like the Bachiller en Artes, that by the 19th century included science subjects such as physics, chemistry, natural history and mathematics. The University of Santo Tomás, for example, started by teaching theology, philosophy and humanities. During the 18th century, the Faculty of Jurisprudence and Canonical Law was established.

In 1871, several schools of medicine and pharmacy were opened. From 1871 to 1883 Santo Tomás alone had 829 registrations of medical students, and from 1883 until 1898, 7965 medical students. By the end of the Spanish colonial rule in 1898. the university had granted the degree of Licenciado en Medicina to 359 graduates and 108 medical doctors. For the doctorate degree in medicine its provision was inspired in the same set of oppositions than those of universities in the metropolis, and at least an additional year of study was required at the Universidad Central de Madrid in Spain.

=== Dispute over the oldest in the Philippines ===
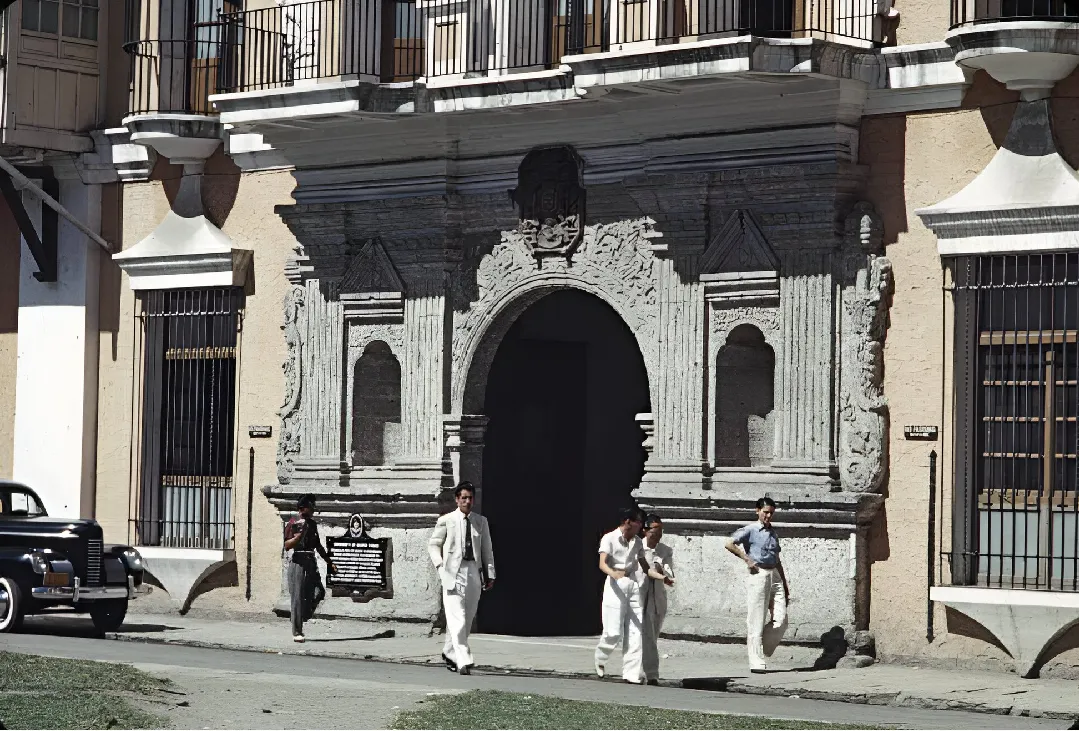
The Royal and Pontifical University of Santo Tomas, established by the Dominican missionaries in 1611 and raised to the rank of a university in 1645 by Pope Innocent X through the petition of Philip IV of Spain, is currently the educational institution with the oldest extant University charter in Asia.

The title of the oldest in the Philippines has been topic for debate between two educational institutions: the University of Santo Tomas and the University of San Carlos.

The University of Santo Tomas, established in 1611 as the Colegio de Nuestra Señora de Santisimo Rosario, is generally recognized as the oldest university in the Philippines. In 1935 the Commonwealth government of the Philippines through the Historical Research and Markers Committee declared that UST was "oldest university under the American flag." In the 1990s, the Intramuros Administration installed a marker on the original site of the University of Santo Tomas with the recognition that the university is the "oldest university in Asia." In 2011 Pope Benedict XVI recognized UST as "the oldest institution of Catholic higher education in the Far East," while in 2012 the National Historical Commission of the Philippines published an online article recognizing UST as "Asia's Oldest University.

However, the University of San Carlos has opposed this recognition and claims that it is older than the University of Santo Tomas by 16 years by tracing its roots to the Colegio de San Ildefonso (established 1595). In 1995, the University of San Carlos celebrated its Quadricentennial (400th Anniversary).

In 2010, the National Historical Commission of the Philippines installed a bronze marker declaring USC's foundation late in the 18th century. According to Dr. Victor Torres of the De La Salle University, the University of San Carlos' claim dates back to 1948 only when USC was declared a university. Fidel Villarroel from the University of Santo Tomas argued that USC only took over the facility of the former Colegio de San Ildefonso and that there is no 'visible' and 'clear' link between San Carlos and San Ildefonso. Aloysius Cartagenas (a Cebuano), in a paper published by Philippiniana Sacra, stated that the foundation year of USC is 1867, and not 1595, while in 2012 the National Historical Commission of the Philippines cemented its previous position when it published an online article recognizing UST as "Asia's Oldest University.

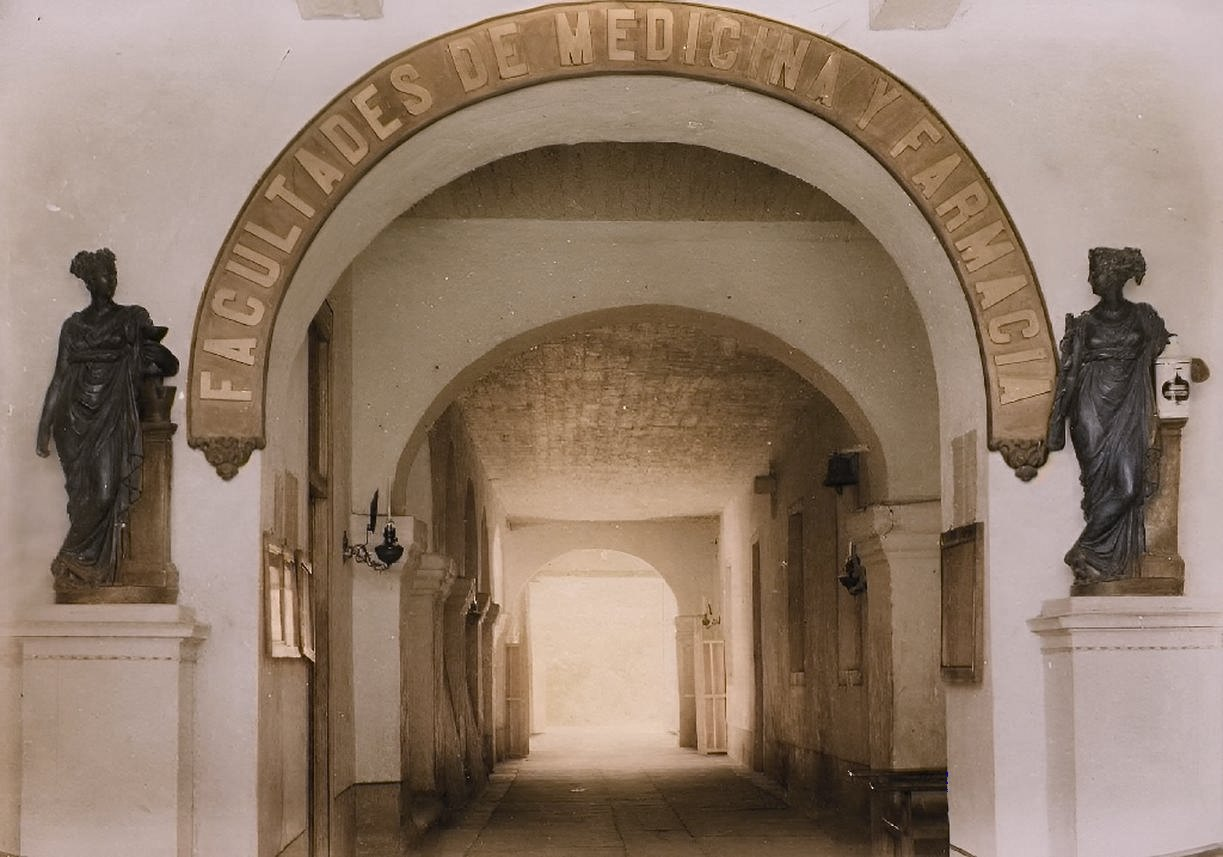
Pharmacy and Medicine classrooms of the Colegio de San José

== Secondary schools ==
A Nautical School was created on January 1, 1820, which offered a four-year course of study (for the profession of pilot of merchant marine) that included subjects such as arithmetic, algebra, geometry, trigonometry, physics, hydrography, meteorology, navigation and pilotage. A School of Commercial Accounting and a School of French and English Languages were established in 1839.

The Don Honorio Ventura College of Arts and Trades (DHVCAT) in Bacolor, Pampanga is said to be the oldest official vocational school in Asia. The vocational school started when an Augustinian friar, Fr. Juan P. Zita, dreamed of helping the young lads of Bacolor. Aided by equally benevolent civic leader Don Felino Gil, the school was officially founded on November 4, 1861, upon the approval of its statutes by Governor-General Lemery as Escuela de Artes y Oficios de Bacolor (School of Arts and Trades of Bacolor) and built it on a lot donated by Suarez sisters of Bacolor. Other important vocational schools established were the Escuela de Contaduría, Academia de Dibujo y Pintura and the seminaries of Manila, Nueva Segovia, Cebú, Jaro and Nueva Cáceres.

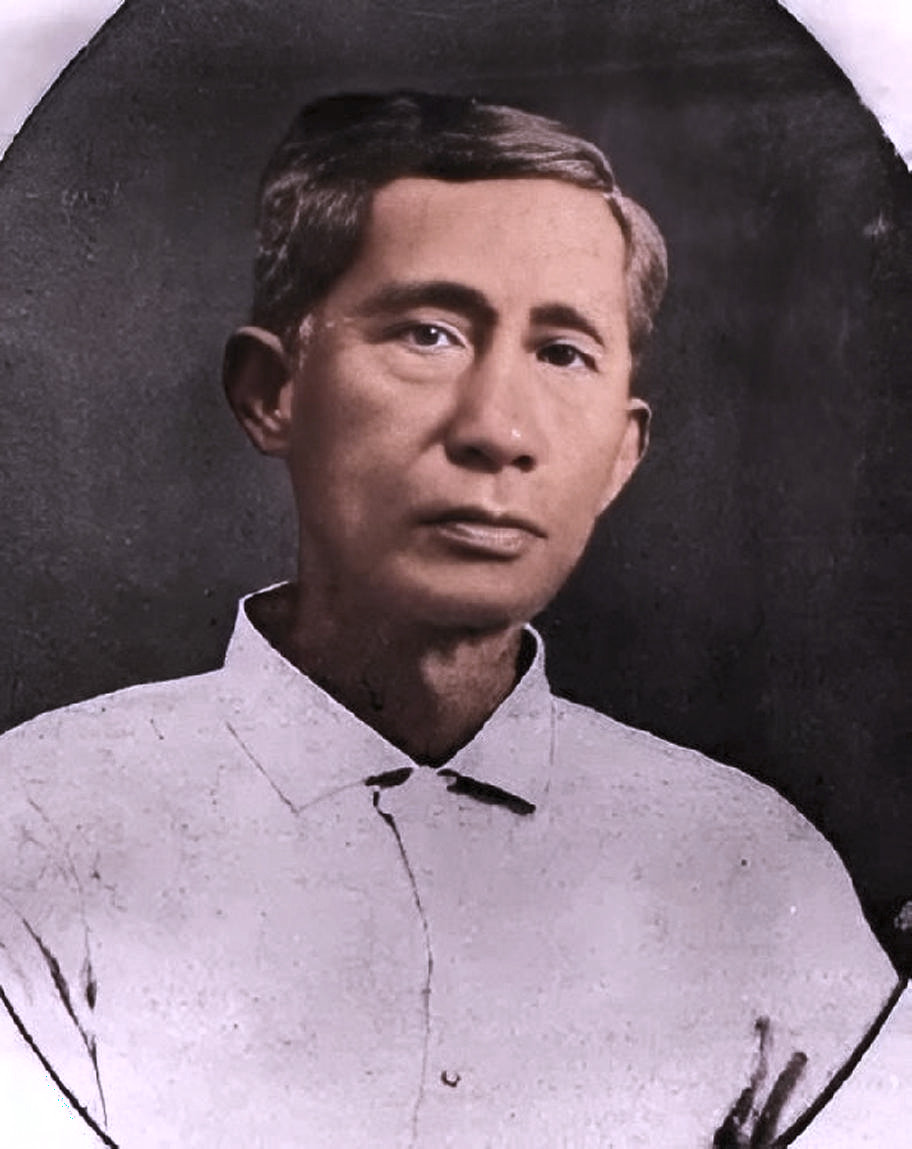
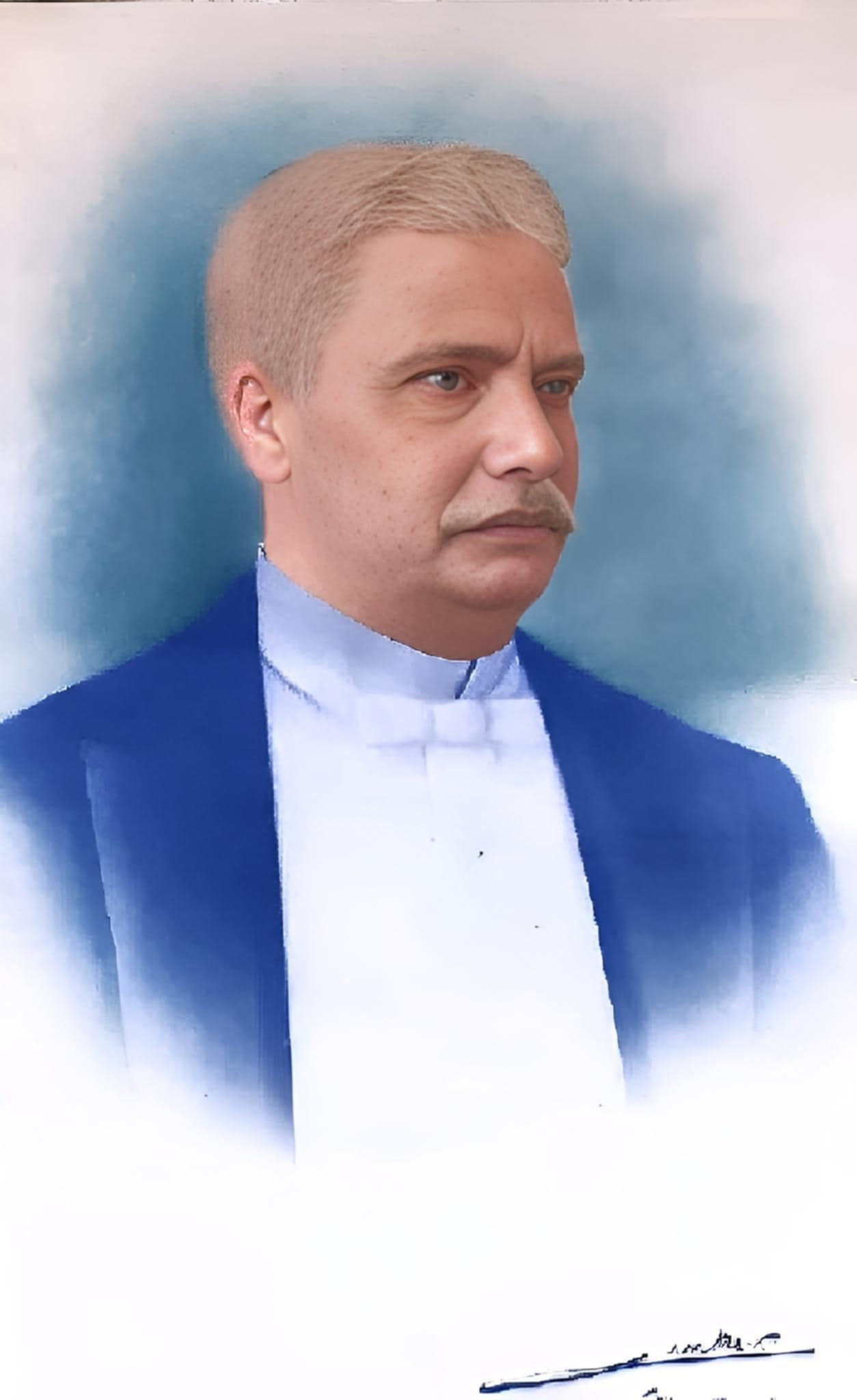
The two master painter instructors of Academia de Dibujo y Pintura; the Tagalog Native Filipino - Lorenzo Guerrero and the Insulares / Spanish Filipino - Lorenzo Rocha.

The Manila School of Agriculture was created in 1887, although it was unable to open its doors until July 1889. Its mission was to provide theoretical and practical education by agricultural engineers to skilled farmers and overseers, and to promote agricultural development by means of observation, experiment and investigation. It included subjects such as mathematics, physics, chemistry, natural history, agriculture, topography, linear and topography drawing. Agricultural schools and monitoring stations, run by professors who were agricultural engineers, were also established in Isabela, Ilocos, Albay, Cebú, Iloílo, Leyte and parts of Mindanao.

The Real Sociedad Económica de los Amigos del País de Filipinas (Royal Economic Society of Friends of the Philippines) was first introduced in the islands in 1780, and offered local and foreign scholarships to Filipinos, professorships and financed trips of scientists from Spain to the Philippines. Throughout the nineteenth century the society established an academy of design, financed the publication of scientific and technical literature, and granted awards to successful experiments and inventions that improved agriculture and industry.

The Observatorio Meteorológico del Ateneo Municipal de Manila (Manila Observatory) was founded in 1865 by the Jesuits after an article they published in the newspaper Diario de Manila, describing typhoon observations made in September 1865, attracted the attention of many readers who publicly requested for the observations to be continued. The Spanish government made the observatory the official institution for weather forecasting in the Philippines in 1884, and in 1885 it started its time service. Its seismology section was set up in 1887, while astronomical studies began in 1899. The Observatory published typhoon and climatological observations and studies, including the first typhoon warnings, a service that was highly appreciated by the business community, specially those involved in merchant shipping.

== Modern public system of education ==
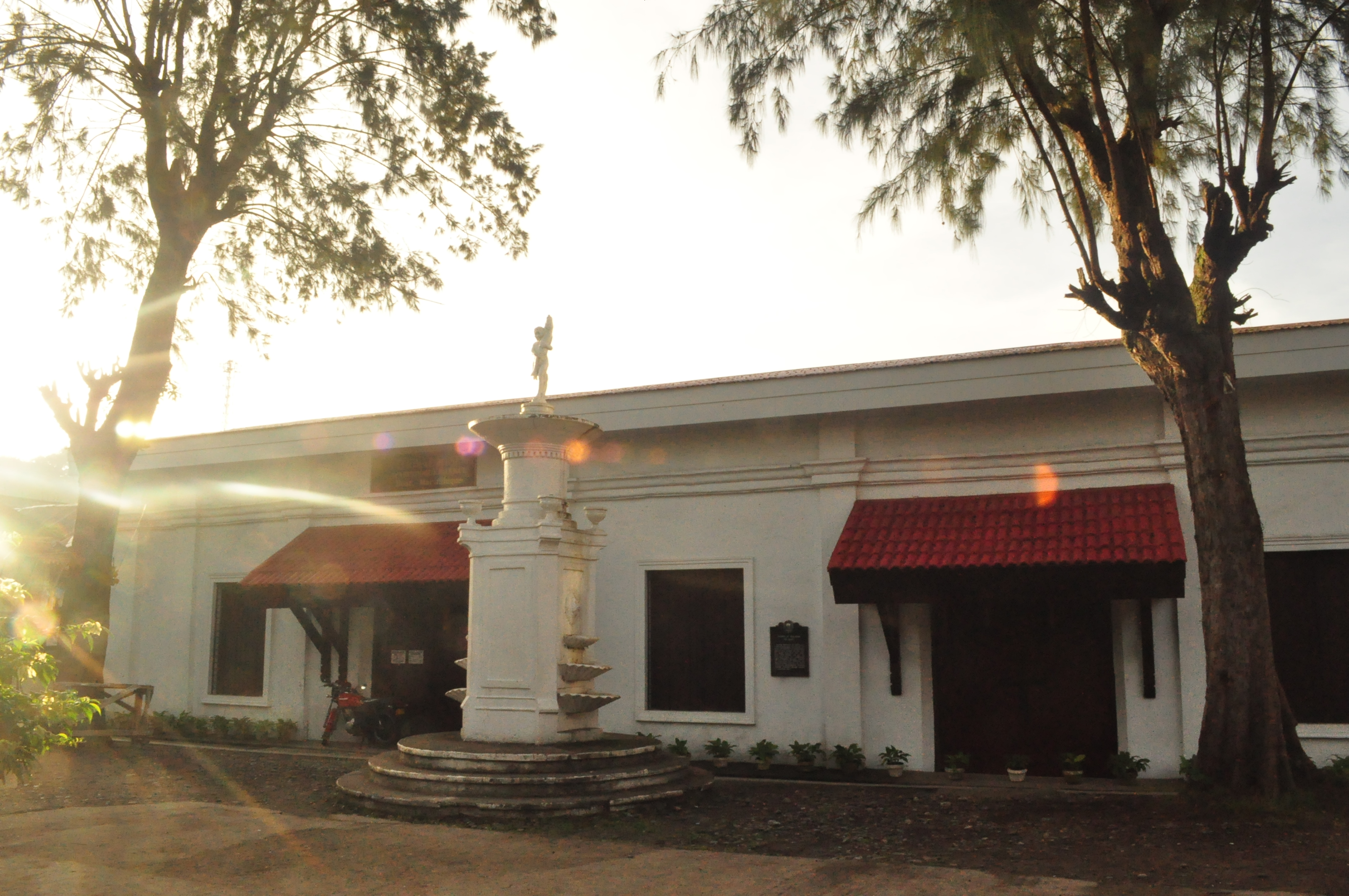
The present branch of the National Museum in Boac was the site of Marinduque's Escuela de Niños, one of the oldest Spanish colonial era public primary schools in the island.

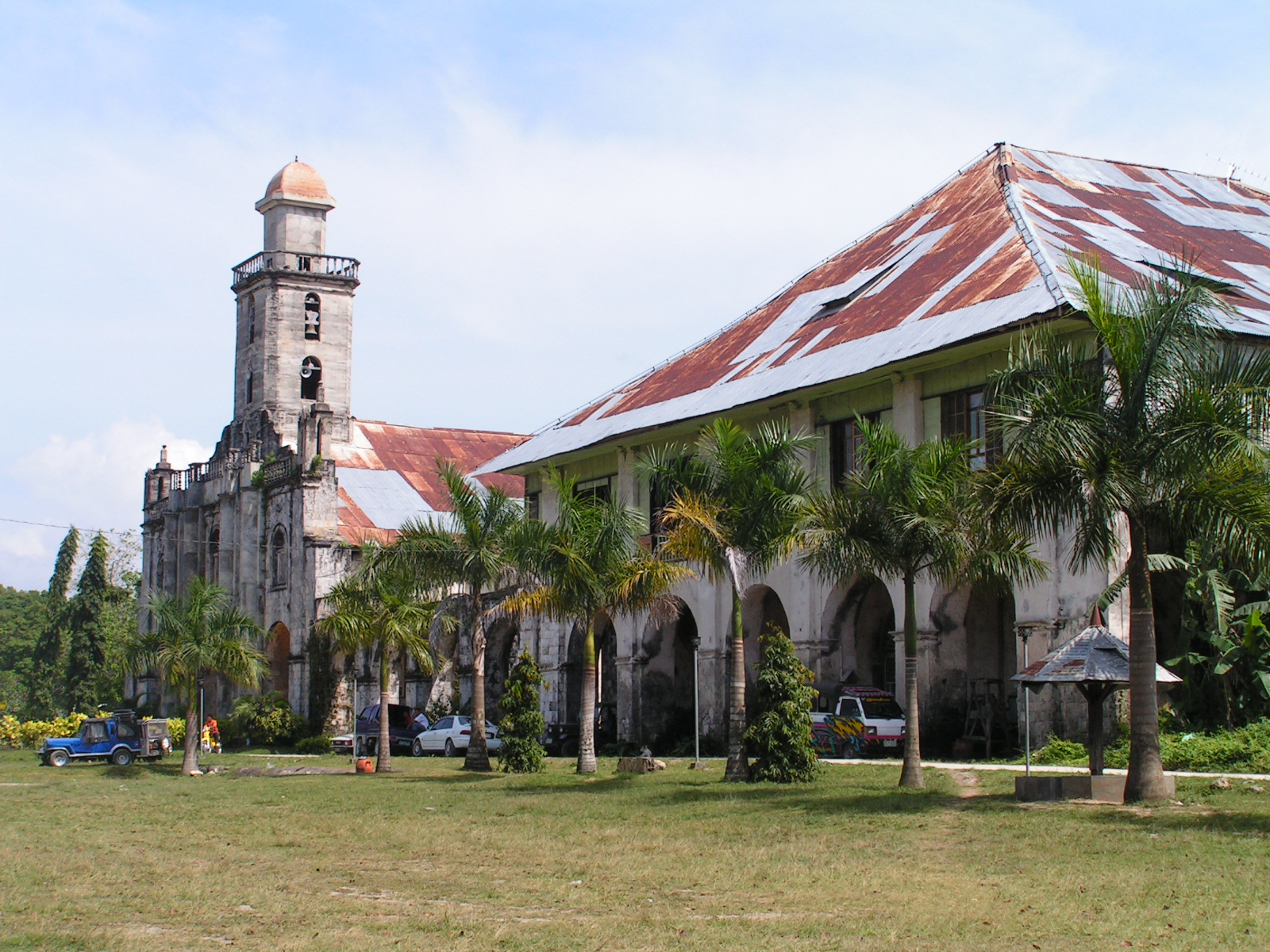
On the left of the Alburquerque Church in Bohol lies the original twin buildings for the Escuela de Niños, built in the 1880s under the supervision of the parish priests.

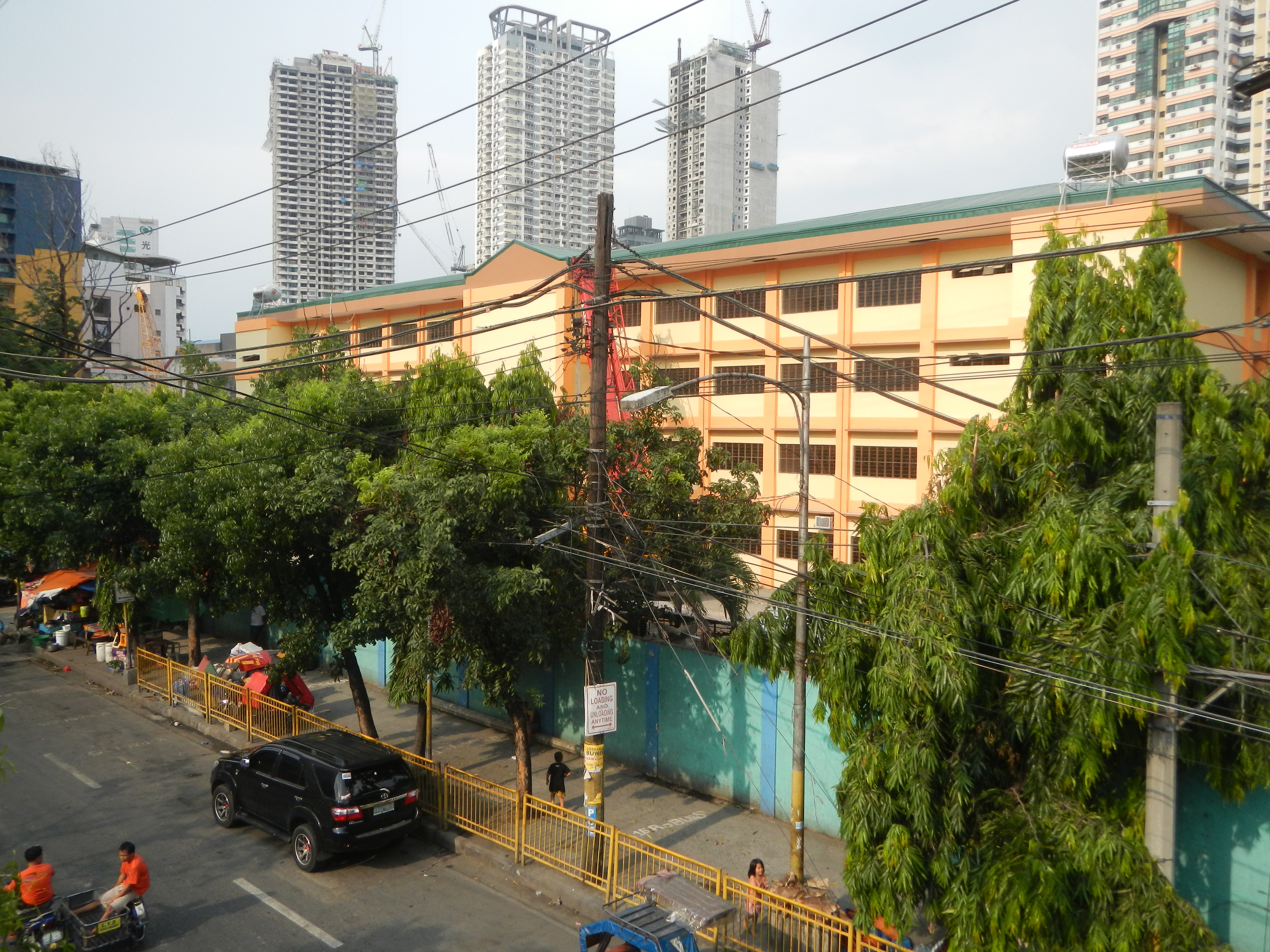
Gen. Gregorio del Pilar Elementary School began as Tondo's Escuela de Niños y Niñas established by the Cebuano entrepreneur Don Guillermo Osmeña in 1865. The school was dedicated to the sons and daughters of indios who couldn't afford the private schools within the vicinity of Tondo.

Modern public school education was introduced in Spain in 1857. This did not exist in any other colony of any European power in Asia. The concept of mass education was relatively new, an offshoot of the 18th century Age of Enlightenment. France was the first country in the world to create a system of mass, public education in 1833.

In the Philippines, free access to modern public education was made possible through the enactment of the Spanish Education Decree of December 20, 1863 by Queen Isabella II. Primary instruction was made free and the teaching of Spanish was compulsory. This was ten years before Japan had a compulsory form of free modern public education and forty years before the American government started an English-based public school system in the Philippines. The royal decree provided for a complete educational system consisting of primary, secondary and tertiary levels, resulting in valuable training for all Filipino children and youth.

The Education Decree of 1863 provided for the establishment of at least two free primary schools, one for boys and another for girls, in each town under the responsibility of the municipal government. It also commended the creation of a free public normal school to train men as teachers, supervised by the Jesuits. One of these schools was the Escuela Normal Elemental, which, in 1896 became the Escuela Normal Superior de Maestros de Manila (The Normal School) for male teachers. The Spanish government also established a school for midwives in 1879, and a Normal School for female teachers in 1892, the Escuela Normal Superior de Maestras. By the 1890s, free public secondary schools were opening outside of Manila, including 10 normal schools for women.

The range of subjects being taught were very advanced, as can be seen from the Syllabus of Education in the Municipal Atheneum of Manila, that included Algebra, Agriculture, Arithmetic, Chemistry, Commerce, English, French, Geography, Geometry, Greek, History, Latin, Mechanics, Natural History, Painting, philosophy, Physics, Rhetoric and poetry, Spanish Classics, Spanish Composition, Topography, and Trigonometry. Among the subjects being taught to girls, as reflected in the curriculum of the Colegio de Santa Isabel, were Arithmetic, Drawing, Dress-cutting, French, Geology, Geography, Geometry, History of Spain, Music, Needlework, Philippine History, Physics, Reading, Sacred History and Spanish Grammar.

Contrary to what the Propaganda of the Spanish–American War tried to depict, the Spanish public system of education was open to all the natives, regardless of race, gender or financial resources. The Black Legend propagation, black propaganda and yellow journalism were rampant in the last two decades of Spanish Colonial Period and throughout the American Colonial Period. (Note: Gómez Rivera 2000, "Finally it should make known that all, absolutely all Filipinos who now occupy high positions in the Assembly (House of Representatives of the Philippines) in the Courts, in commerce, in the arts, and in the administration are products of the Spanish education which the Americans and their lackeys here treacherously attack in newspapers and school textbooks at every turn.") (Note: Morrow 2002, "Even the prominent Dr. Henry Otley Beyer wrote in The Philippines before Magellan (1921) that, "one Spanish priest in Southern Luzon boasted of having destroyed more than three hundred scrolls written in the native character." Historians have searched for the source of Beyer's claim, but until now none have even learned the name of that zealous priest. Furthermore, there has never been a recorded instance of ancient Filipinos writing on scrolls. The fact that they wrote on such perishable materials as leaves and bamboo is probably the reason why no pre-Hispanic documents have survived.") Manuel L. Quezon, on his speech for the Philippine Assembly at the US Congress in October 1914 stated that (Note: Speech of Manuel L. Quezon, for the Philippine Assembly before the US Congress regarding the Jones Bill, October 1914.)

...there were public schools in the Philippines long before the American occupation, and, in fact, I have been educated in one of these schools, even though my hometown is such a small town, isolated in the mountains of the Northeastern part of the island of Luzon.

...as long ago as 1866 when the total population of the Philippine Islands was only 4,411,261 souls, and when the total number of municipalities in the archipelago was 900, the total public schools was 841 for boys and 833 for girls and the total number of children attending these schools was 135,098 for boys and 95,260 for girls. And these schools were real buildings and the pupils alert, intelligent, living human beings. In 1892, the number of schools had increased to 2,137, of which 1,087 were for boys and 1,050 for girls. I have seen with my own eyes many of these schools and thousands of these pupils. They were not religious schools, but schools created, supported and maintained by the Government (Spanish).

Gunnar Myrdal, a renowned Swedish economist, observed that in 19th-century Asia, Japan and Spanish Philippines stood out because of their stress on modern public education.

== Education and Filipino nationalism ==
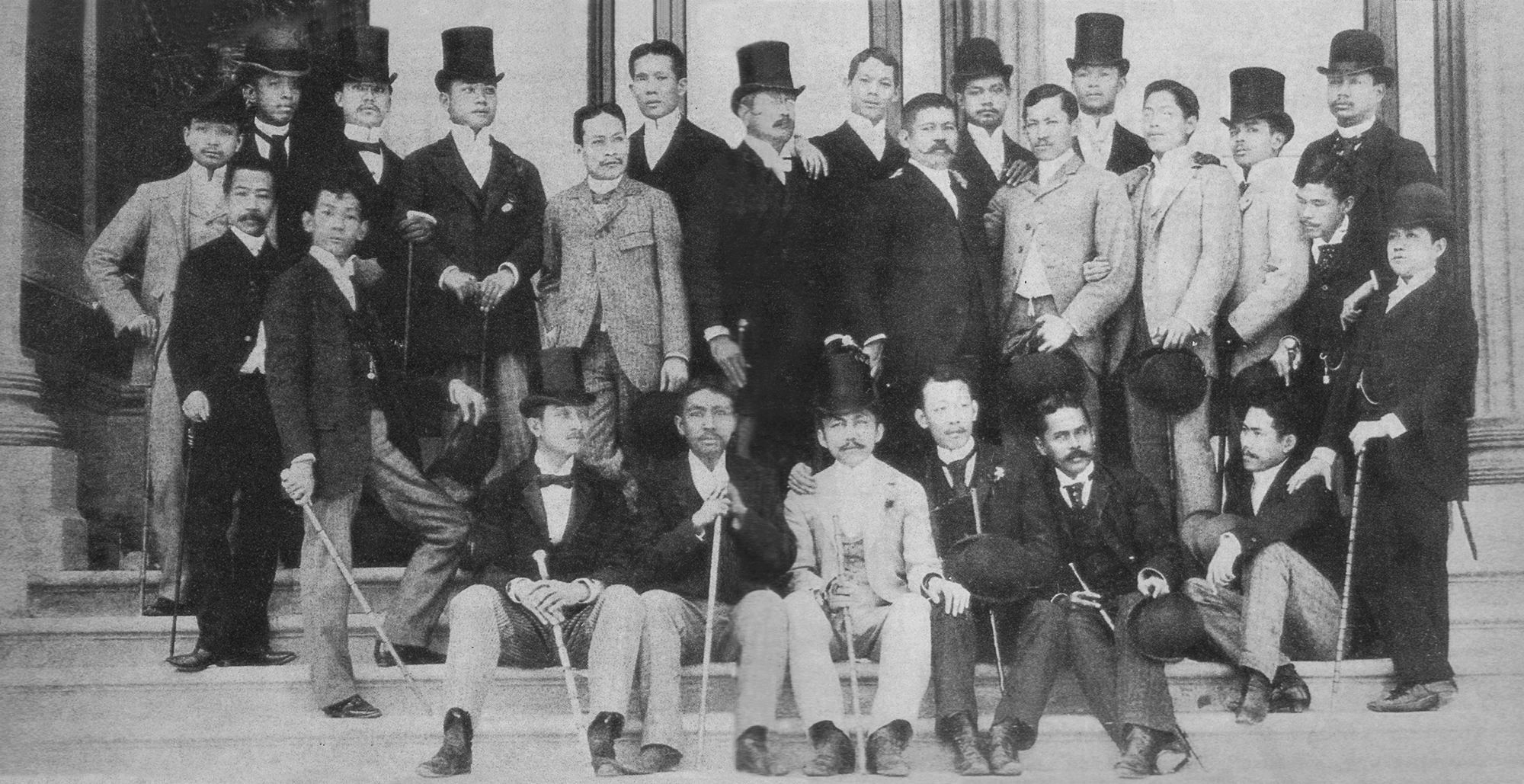
Ilustrados in Madrid (ca.1890)

As a result of increasing the number of educated Filipinos a new social class raised, which came to be known as the Ilustrados. Furthermore, with the opening of the Suez Canal in 1869, travel to Spain became quicker, easier, and more affordable, and many Filipinos took advantage of it to continue higher education in Spain and Europe, mostly in Madrid and Barcelona. This new enlightened class of Filipinos would later lead the Philippine independence movement, using the Spanish language as their main communication method. The most prominent of the Ilustrados was José Rizal, who inspired the desire for independence with his novels written in Spanish. Other Filipino intellectuals, such as Graciano López Jaena, Marcelo H. del Pilar, Mariano Ponce or Antonio Luna, who had also studied in Spain, began contributing to the cause for Filipino self-government and independence.

Describing this new generation of highly educated Filipinos, Fr. John N. Schumacher pointed out that,

Philippine higher education was not far behind, or, under certain aspects, was even superior to the general level of higher education in Spain, at least outside Madrid. Perhaps the best testimony for this is the fact that such larger numbers of Filipino students were able to move without apparent difficulty from educational institutions at home to those in the Peninsula and establish honorable records for themselves there.

The Philippines was also ahead of some European countries in offering education for women. Ironically, it was during the time of American occupation of the Philippines that the results of Spanish education were more visible, especially in the literature, printed press and cinema.

== Criticisms ==
On November 30, 1900, the Philippine Commission reported to the US War Department about the state of education throughout the archipelago as follows:

...Under Spanish rule there were established in these islands a system of primary schools. The Spanish regulations provided that there should be one male and one female primary school-teacher for each 5,000 inhabitants. It is clearly shown in the report of the first Philippine Commission that even this inadequate provision was never carried out. They say: "Taking the entire population at 8,000,000, we find that there is but one teacher to each 4,179 inhabitants." There were no schoolhouses, no modern furniture, and, until the Americans came, there were no good text-books. The schools were and are now held in the residences of the teachers, or in buildings hired by the municipalities and used by the principals as dwellings. In some of the schools there were wooden benches and tables, but it was not at all unusual to find a school without any seats for the pupils. In these primary schools, reading, writing, sacred history, and the catechism were taught. Except in a very few towns, the four elementary arithmetical processes were attempted, and in a few towns a book on geography was used as a reading book. Girls were taught embroidery and needlework. From the beginning the schools were entirely under the supervision of the religious orders, who were disposed to emphasize secondary and higher education for a few pupils rather than to further and promote the primary education of the masses. The result of this policy is that a few persons have stood out prominently as educated Filipinos, while the great mass of people have either not been educated at all or furnished only the rudiments of knowledge, acquiring merely the mechanical processes of reading and writing. The little school instruction the average Filipino has had has not tended to broaden his intelligence or to give him power of independent thought. One observes in the schools a tendency on the part of the pupils to give back, like phonographs, what they have heard or read or memorized, without seeming to have thought for themselves. As a rule, they possess mechanical skill, and they excel in writing and drawing. The Spaniards made very little use of this peculiar capacity.

...It is stated on good authority that when the Spaniards came here several of the tribes of the Philippine Islands could read and write their own language. At the present time, after three hundred years of Spanish domination, the bulk of the people cannot do his. The Spanish minister for the colonies, in a report made December 5, 1870, points out that, by the process of absorption, matters of education had become concentrated in the hands of the religious orders. He says: "While every acknowledgement should be made of their services in earlier times, their narrow, exclusively religious system of education, and their imperviousness to modern or external ideas and influences, which every day become more and more evident, rendered secularization of instruction necessary."

...It has been stated that in 1897 here were in these islands 2,167 public schools. The ineffectiveness of these schools will be seen when it is remembered that a school under the Spanish regime was a strictly sectarian, ungraded school, with no prescribed course of study and no definite standards for each year, and that they were in charge of duly certificated but hardly professionally trained or progressive teachers, housed in unsuitable and unsanitary buildings.

Those numbers led some people to conclude that less than 6% of the population were attending schools. However that assumption was misleading because it is calculated based on the entire population, including babies and senior citizens, when in reality public school systems are meant primarily for children and teenagers. In order to calculate the percentage of children attending schools, the number of children of school age must be used, including those of elementary school age (ages 5 through 13) and teenagers in High School age (ages 14 through 17). That would yield a total percentage of around 20% of the total population. Since the 1887 census yielded a count of 6,984,727, 20% would be approximately 1,4 million. Also, by 1892 the number of schools had more than doubled to 2,137, 1,087 of which were for boys and 1,050 for girls, which means that the number of children attending school also did increase, to at least 500,000, by conservative estimates. That's about 35% of the population in School age.

Another claim commonly heard was that based on the official figures there couldn't be a school in every village in the Islands, as Manuel L. Quezon declared years later before the Philippine Assembly. However, since those official figures branded by the Philippine Commission itself put the total number of municipalities in the archipelago at 900, and the number of public schools at 2,167, those numbers reveal that there was not only one school in every municipality in the Islands, but in most cases two or more.

Neither was taken into account that the schools maintained by Spain were closed and in many cases looted and badly damaged during the Spanish–American War and the Philippine Revolution. Although the free and compulsory elementary education system was temporarily reestablished by the Malolos Constitution, it was finally dismantled after the Philippine–American War, that also took a heavy toll upon the remaining educational infrastructures.

Finally, the Philippine Commission made no reference to the fact that the pioneering public school education introduced by Spain in the Philippines was the first of its kind in all of Asia, and the first to be established in any European colony in the world. Such system was even ahead of most of United States at the time, where by 1900 only 34 states had any kind of compulsory schooling laws requiring attendance until age 14. As a result, the average American at the time was less educated than the average Filipino, something that was specially true among the troops that fought in the Philippine–American War, since most of the soldiers generally were of humble social origins.

== See also ==
- Education in the Philippines
- Education in the Philippines during United States rule
- Department of Education (Philippines)
- Education in Spain
- Philippine literature in Spanish
- Spanish language in the Philippines
- History of the Philippines

== Bibliography ==
- Abinales, Patricio N.; Amoroso, Donna J. (2005), State and Society in the Philippines (illustrated ed.), Lanham, Maryland, United States of America: Rowman & Littlefield, p. 353, ISBN 0-7425-1024-7, OCLC 57452454
- Andrade Jr., Pío (2001), Education and Spanish in the Philippines, Madrid, Spain: Asociación Cultural Galeón de Manila, archived from the original on July 26, 2011
- Arcilla, José S. (1998), An Introduction to Philippine History (4th ed.), Quezon City, Philippines: Ateneo de Manila University Press, p. 141, ISBN 971-550-261-X, OCLC 46698904
- Coleman, Ambrose (2009) [First published 1899], The Friars in the Philippines, Charleston, South Carolina, United States of America: BiblioBazaar, LLC, p. 182, ISBN 978-1-113-71989-8
- Cruz, Isagani R. (December 17, 2009), "The first university", The Philippine Star, Manila, Philippines, Education and Home
- de Santa María, Fernando (1863), Manual de medicinas caseras para consuelo de los pobres Indios en las provincias y pueblos donde no hay médicos ni botica (in Spanish), Manila, Philippines: Imprenta de la Universidad Pontificia de Santo Tomás, á cargo de D. Juan Cortada, p. 208
- de la Costa, Horacio (1967), The Jesuits in the Philippines, 1581–1768 (3rd ed.), s.n., p. 702, OCLC 11565876
- Delgado Criado, Buenaventura (1994), Historia de la educación en España y América: La educación en la España contemporánea (1789–1975) (in Spanish) (illustrated ed.), Madrid, Spain: Ediciones Morata S.L., p. 974, ISBN 84-7112-378-9
- Gómez Rivera, Guillermo (September 20, 2000), The Filipino State, Spain: Buscoenlaces, CHAPTER VI 1900s: The Filipino people was deprived of its own state, archived from the original on September 23, 2010
- Harper, Bambi (April 5, 2002), "For the record", Philippine Daily Inquirer, Makati City, Philippines, Editorial & Opinion, archived from the original on April 23, 2003
- Lumbera, Bienvenido L. (2001), Tagalog Poetry, 1570–1898: Tradition and Influences in Its Development, Quezon City, Philippines: Ateneo de Manila University Press, p. 267, ISBN 971-550-374-8, OCLC 15870123
- Meade, Teresa A.; Wiesner-Hanks, Merry E., eds. (2004), A Companion to Gender History (illustrated ed.), Wiley-Blackwell, p. 676, ISBN 0-631-22393-2, OCLC 441756114
- Mojares, Resil (2006), Brains of the Nation: Pedro Paterno, T.H. Pardo de Tavera, Isabelo de los Reyes and the Production of Modern Knowledge, Quezon City, Philippines: Ateneo de Manila University Press, p. 565, ISBN 971-550-496-5, OCLC 76895524
- Morrow, Paul (2002), "Baybayin - The Ancient Script of the Philippines", Sarisari etc...Filipino History, Language, Pop Culture & other completely unrelated stuff, Manitoba, Canada: Manitoba Telecom Services, archived from the original on August 21, 2010
- Quezon, Manuel Luis (1915), Asamblea Filipina, Tercera Legislatura, Tercer Período de Sesiones, Documento N.^{o} 4042-A 87, Discursos del Hon. Manuel L. Quezon, comisionado residente de Filipinas, Pronunciados en la Cámara de representantes de los Estados Unidos con motivo de la discusión del Bill Jones, 26, septiembre-14, octubre, 1914 [Philippine Assembly, Third Legislature, Third Session, Document No.4042-A 87 Speeches of Honorable Manuel L. Quezon, Philippine resident commissioner, delivered in the House of Representatives of the United States during the discussion of Jones Bill, 26 September-14 October 1914] (in Spanish), Manila, Philippines: Bureau of Printing, archived from the original on October 10, 2012
- Rodao, Florentino (1997), "Spanish language in the Philippines: 1900–1940", Philippine Studies, 45, Quezon City, Philippines: Ateneo de Manila University Press: 94–107, ISSN 0031-7837, OCLC 612174151
- Schumacher, John N. (1997), The Creation of a Filipino Consciousness, The Making of the Revolution: The Propaganda Movement 1880–1895 (revised ed.), Quezon City, Philippines: Ateneo de Manila University Press, p. 333, ISBN 971-550-209-1, OCLC 39026910
- Schumacher, John N. (1991), The Making of a Nation: Essays on Nineteenth-Century Filipino Nationalism, Quezon City, Philippines: Ateneo de Manila University Press, p. 269, ISBN 971-550-019-6, OCLC 26201089
- Villareal, Corazón (January 20, 2006), "Language and Desire in Hiligaynon" (PDF), Paper Presented at Tenth International Conference on Austronesian Linguistics, Puerto Princesa City, Palawan, Philippines, archived from the original (PDF) on January 11, 2007
- Zialcita, Fernando Nakpil (January 9, 2004), "Darkness in Intramuros", Philippine Daily Inquirer, Makati City, Philippines, Editorial and Opinion, archived from the original on December 1, 2006
