= León María Guerrero =

León María Guerrero may refer to:

- León María Guerrero (botanist) (1853–1935), Filipino botanist, pharmacist, revolutionary, and politician
- León María Guerrero (diplomat) (1915–1982), Filipino diplomat and novelist
