= Nakpil =

Nakpil is a surname. Notable people with the surname include:

- Carmen Guerrero Nakpil (born 1922), Filipino writer and historian
- Juan Nakpil (1899–1986), Filipino architect, teacher and community leader
- Julio Nakpil (1867–1960), Philippine composer who fought in the Philippine Revolution
