= Lourdes Leon Guerrero =

Lourdes Leon Guerrero may refer to:

- Lourdes A. Leon Guerrero, commonly known as Lou Leon Guerrero, a Guamian nurse, politician, and business leader serving as Governor of Guam since 2019
- Lourdes Santiago Torres Leon Guerrero, Guamian educator
