= Florentino Rodao =

Spanish historian

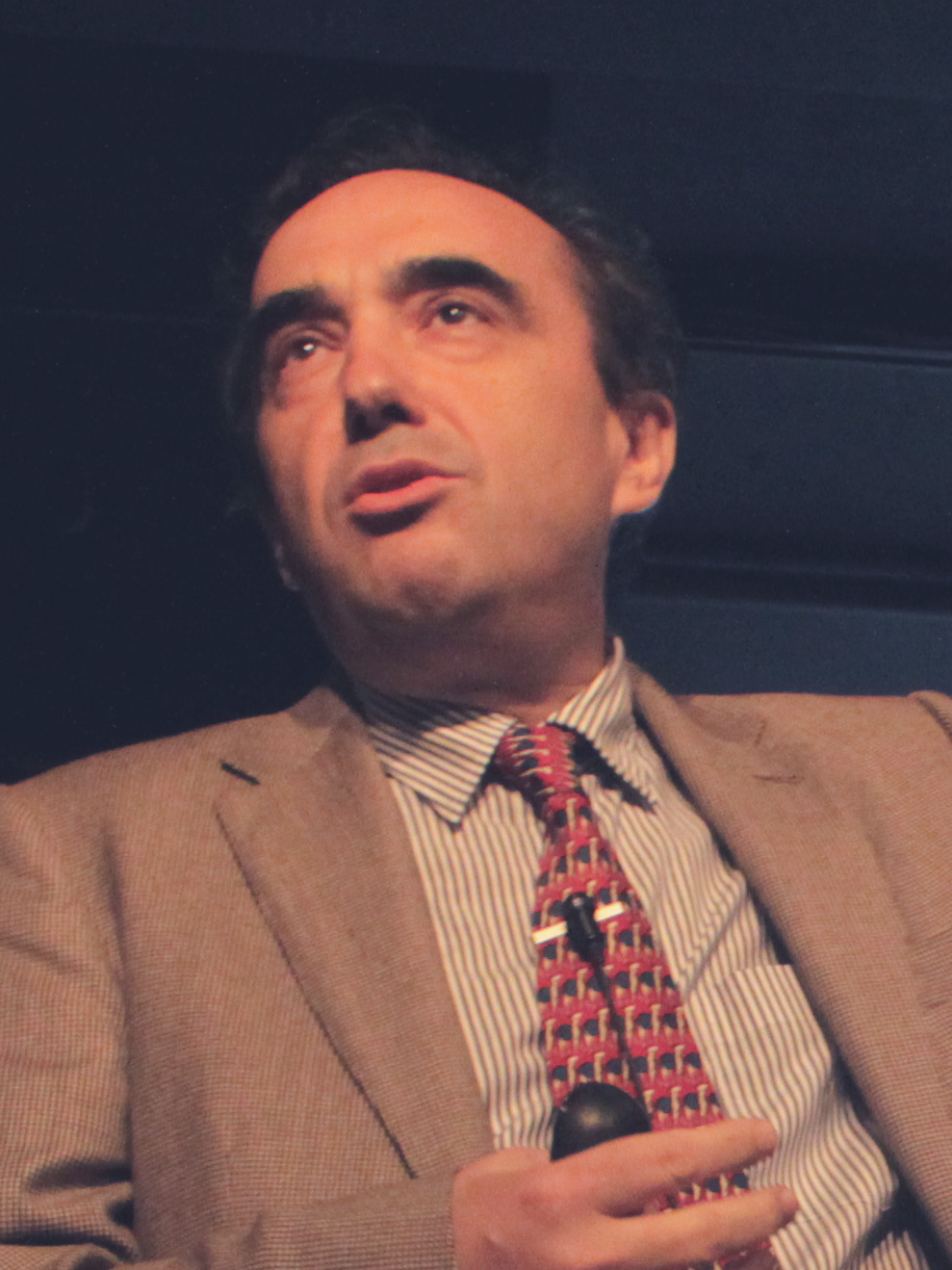

Florentino Rodao García (born 1960) is a Spanish historian and Japanologist. His historical research deals with Asian studies and International relations. He is full professor of the Complutense University of Madrid (UCM).

== Biography ==
Florentino Rodao was born in 1960 in Madrid.

He obtained a PhD at the UCM in 1993, reading a thesis about the Spanish-Japanese relations, 1937–1945. Having lived in Thailand, the Philippines and Japan, he briefly worked as teacher of Spanish language for Prince Naruhito in 1992. He earned a PhD in the University of Tokyo in 2007, reading a thesis on The Spanish Community in the Philippines, 1935–1939: The impact of the War in Spain and the preparations for Philippine Independence in its evolution and identity.

Because of his investigations, Rodao has been able to interview people from World War II, such as minister Ramón Serrano Suñer, communist leader Santiago Carrillo, ambassador Eikichi Hayashiya, spy Ángel Alcázar de Velasco or the Republican consul in Japan José Luis Alvarez Taladriz, as well as Japanese residents in Spain or members of the Spanish community in the Philippines, especially Anna Maria Aguilella, the only survivor of the massacre at the Spanish consulate in Manila in 1945.

== Works ==
- Españoles en Siam (1540–1939). Una aportación al estudio de la presencia hispana en Asia Oriental. Madrid: Consejo Superior de Investigaciones Científicas. 1997.
- Franco y el imperio japonés. Imágenes y propaganda en tiempos de guerra. Barcelona: Plaza & Janés. 2002.
- Franquistas sin Franco: una historia alternativa de la Guerra Civil española desde Filipinas. Comares. 2012.
- La soledad del país vulnerable. Japón desde 1945. Crítica. 2019.
