= Gemma Cruz-Araneta =

Filipino politician, writer, director, and beauty queen

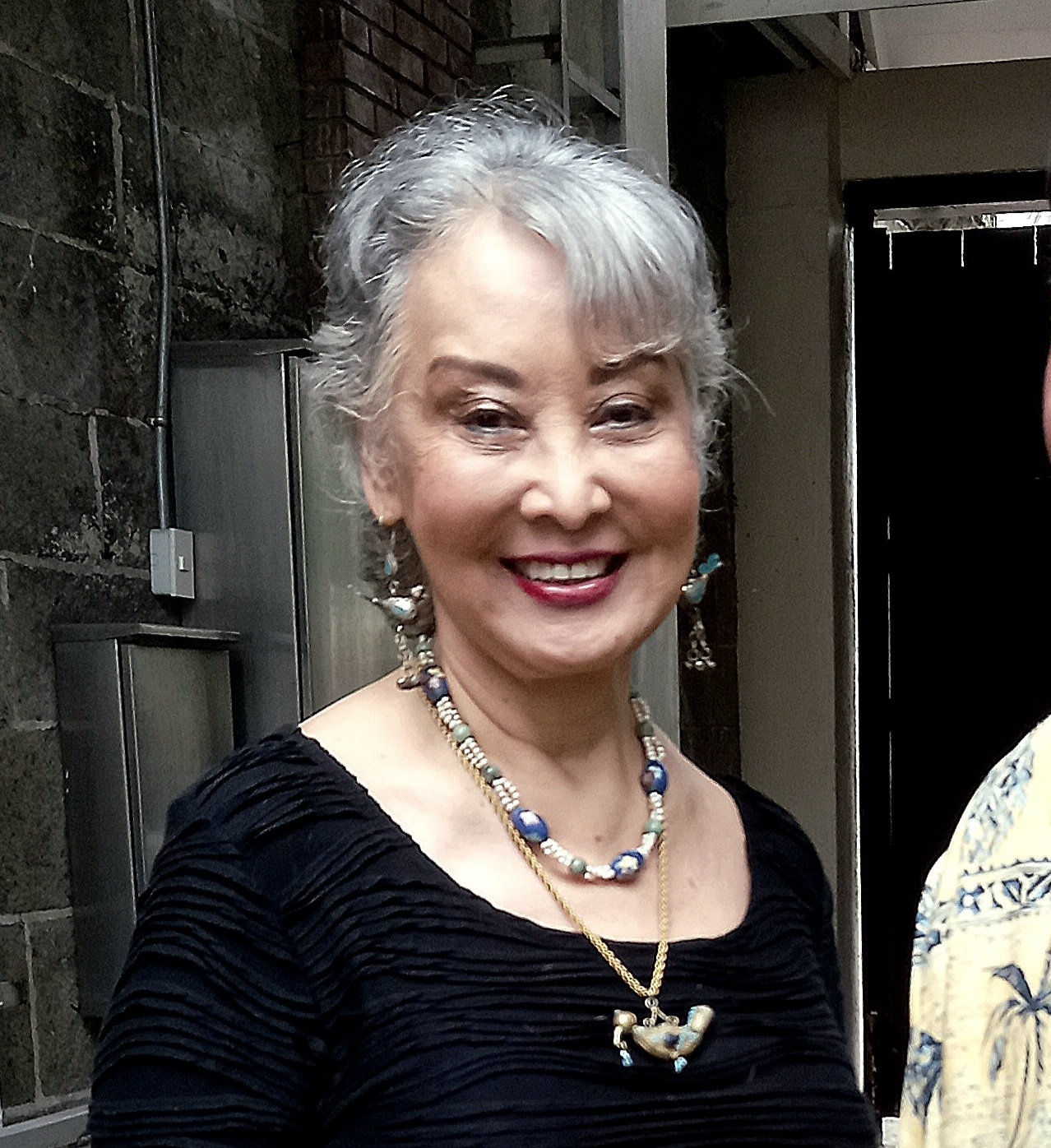
- Cruz in 2023

10th Secretary of Tourism
- In office June 30, 1998 – January 20, 2001
- President: Joseph Estrada
- Preceded by: Mina Gabor
- Succeeded by: Richard Gordon

Personal details
- Born: Gemma Teresa Guerrero Cruz; September 30, 1943 (age 83) Manila, Philippines
- Spouse: Antonio Araneta
- Relations: Araneta family (by marriage); León María Guerrero III (uncle); León María Guerrero (great-grandfather)
- Parent(s): Carmen Guerrero Nakpil (mother); Ismaél A. Cruz (father)
- Beauty pageant titleholder
- Title: Miss Philippines 1964; Miss International 1964
- Hair color: Black
- Eye color: Brown
- Major competitions: Miss Philippines 1964 (Winner); Miss International 1964 (Winner)

Gemma Teresa Guerrero Cruz-Araneta (Tagalog pronunciation: [ˈkɾus ɐɾɐˈnɛtɐ]; born September 30, 1943) is a Filipino writer and director who served as the tenth secretary of tourism from 1998 to 2001. A former beauty queen, Araneta was previously crowned Miss International 1964, which made her the first Filipino and the first Asian to win the title, as well as the first from Southeast Asia to win a major beauty pageant title. Although, she was followed by Aurora Pijuan in 1970.

== Family ==
Araneta's paternal great-grandmother was Doña Maria Mercado, the sister of the Philippines' national hero, José Rizal. Her mother is writer and journalist Carmen Guerrero Nakpil, her maternal uncle is writer and diplomat León María Guerrero III, and her great-great-grandfather is revolutionary leader, distinguished botanist and pharmacist León María Guerrero y Leogardo.

== Pageantry ==
Araneta earned the right to represent the country at the 1964 Miss International contest by winning the Miss Philippines 1964 pageant, sponsored by the city of Manila. She donated the US$10,000 prize money to the Manila Boys Town and Girls Home, a home for indigent and out-of-school youth in Marikina. This led the Congress to pass a resolution to exempt her from paying taxes. She went on to win the pageant. She received an "Outstanding Manileña" and a "Golden Heart" Presidential decoration from the former Philippine President Diosdado Macapagal.

In a 2021 podcast, Araneta commented that her victory at the Miss International pageant may had been a political ploy to deflect scrutiny away from the United States amidst the then-ongoing Vietnam War. Prior to the pageant, she recalled a female Political Science professor of her who used to characterize beauty contests as "an instrument of the Cold War" and with the political issue that the United States was facing, Gemma thought, "Maybe this is the time for an Asian, you know, to win".

== Government career ==
Araneta first entered public service in 1968 when President Ferdinand Marcos appointed her Director of the National Museum. She was concurrently a member of the National Historical Commission of the Philippines. She was appointed secretary of tourism by President Joseph Estrada, a position she held from June 30, 1998, until the Estrada administration was overthrown on January 20, 2001 as a result of the Second EDSA Revolution.

== Other activities ==
Araneta resumed her writing career in 2001 and has now a bi-weekly column editorial section in the Manila Bulletin.

In 2003, she was elected director/trustee and president of the Heritage Conservation Society of the Philippines and was re-elected in February 2006.

On May 16, 2005, Araneta started hosting a daily radio programme, Krus Na Daan (Filipino for "Crossroads"), on DZRJ 810 and a weekly television show, Only Gemma! on Rajah Broadcasting Network.

In April 2010, Araneta was named as one of the members of the Board of Regents of the Pamantasan ng Lungsod ng Maynila.

== Works ==
Araneta has authored and co-authored several books on Philippine history and other related topics, namely:

- Makisig, the Little Hero of Mactan (1964)
- Hanoi Diary: Beauty and Fashion for the Filipina (1968; co-written with Antonio Araneta)
- Sentimiento: Fiction and Nostagia - Katha at Salamisim (1995)
- El Galeón de Manila: Un Mar de Historias (1997; co-author)
- Stones of Faith (1998)
- Rizal's True Love (2014)

== Personal life ==
Araneta is married to Antonio "Tonypet" Araneta and they have two children, Fatimah and Leon.

Awards and achievements
Preceded by (Iceland) Guðrún Bjarnadóttir	Miss International; 1964	Succeeded by (Germany) Ingrid Finger
Political offices
Preceded by Mina T. Gabor	Secretary of Tourism; 1998 – 2001	Succeeded by Richard J. Gordon
