= Ángel Alcázar de Velasco =

Spanish journalist (1909–2001)

- Born: 1909; Spain, Guadalajara
- Died: 2001, (92 years); Spain, Madrid
- Education: University of Salamanca
- Occupations: Journalist, Spy

Ángel Alcázar de Velasco (1909 in Mondéjar – 2001 in Galapagar) was an apprentice bullfighter, Falangist, journalist and spy.

== Early life ==
His origins are humble. He earned a degree in Philosophy from the University of Salamanca in 1932. He was a Falangist from the beginning, and was awarded with the Palma de Plata by José Antonio Primo de Rivera in 1934. During those years, he worked as a journalist in the Falangist press and for the newspaper La Nación. He travelled as a correspondent to places like Ethiopia (during the Second Italo-Abyssinian War), where he met the German Wilhelm Oberbeil. Oberbeil was the one who introduced him to the Abwehr, a German military intelligence (information gathering) organization, in Berlin in 1935. At the outbreak of the Spanish Civil War, he was a prisoner in Larrínaga, Bilbao, but he succeeded in escaping.

== Role in the Falange ==
He was a convinced Falangist. He began his involvement taking part in the Asturian miners' strike of 1934 as a reporter. He was awarded the above-mentioned prize, Palma de Plata, due to his work. It is important to highlight his work as a journalist in the Falangist press and in the newspaper La Nación. He was imprisoned in the prison of Bilbao, Larrínaga, for crimes against the Spanish Second Republic, because of his work as a gunman for the Falange (the Spanish Falangist movement). He was present at the time of the uprising of the Nationalist army on July 18, 1936. When he was due to be transferred he escaped from the prison and fled to the national zone. In 1937, he traveled to Salamanca as a correspondent at the front for an interview with Manuel Hedilla, National Leader of the Falange, who tried to gain support against those who had a sense of entitlement due to their proximity to José Antonio Primo de Rivera. The situation in Salamanca had divided the Nationalists in two. The Hedilla supporters, under the command of Agustín Aznar, Sancho Dávila and Rafael Dávila Garcerán, were backed by the Germans. Furthermore, rumors were spread from the headquarters of Francisco Franco to destroy and discredit both factions, before they then presented themselves as saviours. According to his memories, Alcázar de Velasco intuits this and therefore proposes, at least twice, to murder Francisco Franco.

A few days later, a scuffle took place and two Falangists were killed. Franco is appointed to the position of maximum command by headquarters in order to unify the Nationalists and avoid an internal war. Alcázar was arrested for participating in the events, tried for "military rebellion" and sentenced to life imprisonment. After going through several prisons, he ended up in Fort San Cristobal, Pamplona. There, he was caught up in one of the major escapes of republican prisoners in the Spanish Civil War, and escaped to Pamplona to warn about the events. As a result, the sentence was reduced to just two years.

In January 1940 he was appointed press officer of the Institute of Political Studies in Madrid thanks to his friendship with Ramón Serrano. Alcazar decides to talk to the British Ambassador Samuel Hoare, presenting himself as a radical Falangist with opposing ideas to Francoist Spain. In the summer of 1940 he travels to London, where he arrived as a press officer at the Spanish Embassy in London.

== Cooperation with the Third Reich ==
In January 1940, he meets Oberbeil due to his friendship with Ramón Serrano Suñer, who suggests that he goes to London as a spy for the German intelligence service Abwehr. While other Spaniard Miguel Piernavieja del Pozo, takes charge of sending reports to the Germans, Alcázar de Velasco created a spy network in Spain. His main objective in this task was to inform about the traffic of British ships, to gain information from the staff of British embassies and, eventually, to come up with a plan in order to blow up the Rock of Gibraltar. To do this, Wilhelm Canaris came to Spain.

Piernavieja was dismissed from his post because he led a lax life, and was sent to the Blue Division. Alcazar narrates in his memories that he usually visited the places that were bombed in London and gave information to the Germans for future attacks, and organized anti-Francoist guerrillas in order to send them to Spain. The Spanish embassy in London did not have good security measures, so most of the information was intercepted by the MI5, the British Security Service.

That same year, in autumn, Alcázar made contact with Charles de Gaulle as a member of Abwehr during a mission in which Alcazar had to send several million pounds to help the Free France organization and to devalue the British currency.

In his memories, Alcázar de Velasco shows his thoughts about the World War and also shows his esoteric personality: a conflict between the hidden powers of Wel that were represented by the national socialists who defended European Civilization against the Jewish’ Kahal. He is profoundly anti-semitic and thinks that the allies and the Soviet Union form part of an international Jewish conspiracy.

In March 1941, Alcázar began working for Walter Schellenberg, who was the espionage boss of the SS, RSHA. Because of this, Alcázar got involved in Operation Willi, in which the people who worked for Walter Schellenberg tried to kidnap the Duke of Windsor in Portugal.

In 1944, he traveled to Germany and worked again for the SS and helped them purge the Abwehr, association which had been broken up due to the Solf case Solf Kreis) in February (of the same year). Alcázar stayed in Berlín until the end of World War II. He narrates in his memories that he stayed at the Chancellery bunker until 24 April 1945. After that, he was able to escape to Switzerland and was repatriated to Spain.

After his arrival in Spain, he kept working for the Third Reich helping them escape from Germany.

== Tõ Network ==
Ángel Alcázar began working for the Japanese shortly after coming back from Madrid in what is known as his most ambitious project: the Tõ network (東機関).

Japan desperately needed information on the allies; Japanese and German espionage networks in the United States were being dismantled and Japan needed agents to keep them informed, especially in the United States.

This need is what brought Spain into the picture since it had some hard to find qualities, such a close relationship with Latin America. That's why Ramón Serrano suggested to the Japanese that they hire Alcázar, they saw Alcázar as the right man for the job not only because of Serrano's recommendation, but also thanks to the fact that time was a scarce resource. They also took advantage of his espionage network in London that led to the future creation of another in the United States. That's how shortly after arriving in Madrid in early January, Alcázar began working for the Japanese by sending them reports entitled "Tō Network".

The Tō Network generated more information than any other espionage network in the United States. But it is important to emphasise that the quality was not as good as the quantity. The information that Alcázar was selling to the Japanese and the Germans left a lot to be desired, and most of this information was made up by Alcázar. However, the Japanese didn't seem to notice and even if they did, they preferred to keep receiving information, information that the Americans already knew were being sent out.

As they would reveal after the allied victory, the USA was always aware of Alcázar's movements, while also undervaluing him as a spy. As was disclosed in the "Magic Summaries", the info the Japanese had was always easily decoded by the USA since the beginning — this was thanks to the acquisition of the codes.

The Tõ network was made up, according to Alcázar's memories, of 21 agents. This, however, has always been the object of debate, as some authors are convinced that it was just an invention. Others, on the other hand, believed that the existence of these agents could be true.

The Tõ network lost all its credibility in an attempt to turn the tide of World War II at the beginning of 1943 when Alcázar and Suñer tried to make the Japanese believe that there was an attempt to make peace with the USA without Japan. The Japanese, alarmed by this turn of events, checked this information asking some of the participants (such as Ribbentrop). These participants denied any meeting of the sort. After this, Alcázar, and in less measure Suñer, lost their credibility in Japan. Strangely enough, even after this incident, Japan continued to buy information from Spain. It is believed that this was due to their extreme need for information on the enemy and, due to a shortage of resources, their inability to acquire it. The reason behind this plot was to make Japan attack Russia so that the tide of the war could change.

Japan continued buying information from Alcázar until the end of the war, even though he was by then considered little more than a liar.

== Activity after the war ==
Once the World War II finished, he worked as a journalist: first, for the newspaper La Tarde. Then, as a correspondent in Paris and Buenos Aires. Later, as the director of the Literary Supplement in a Mexican newspaper. After that, as a special reporter for a French press agency around the world. And lastly, for the Francoist press. However, in his memoirs he himself admits he did not abandon espionage until 1958.

Ángel Alcázar de Velasco died in May 2001 at the age of 92 years in the locality.

== List of works ==
- "Martín Borman did not die in Berlin: I took him to South América", París, 1960.
- "Los 7 días de Salamanca" Ed. G. Del Toro, Madrid, 1976.
- "Memorias de un agente secreto", Ed Plaza & Janés, Barcelona, 1979.
