= Academia de Dibujo y Pintura =

Former art school in Manila, Philippines

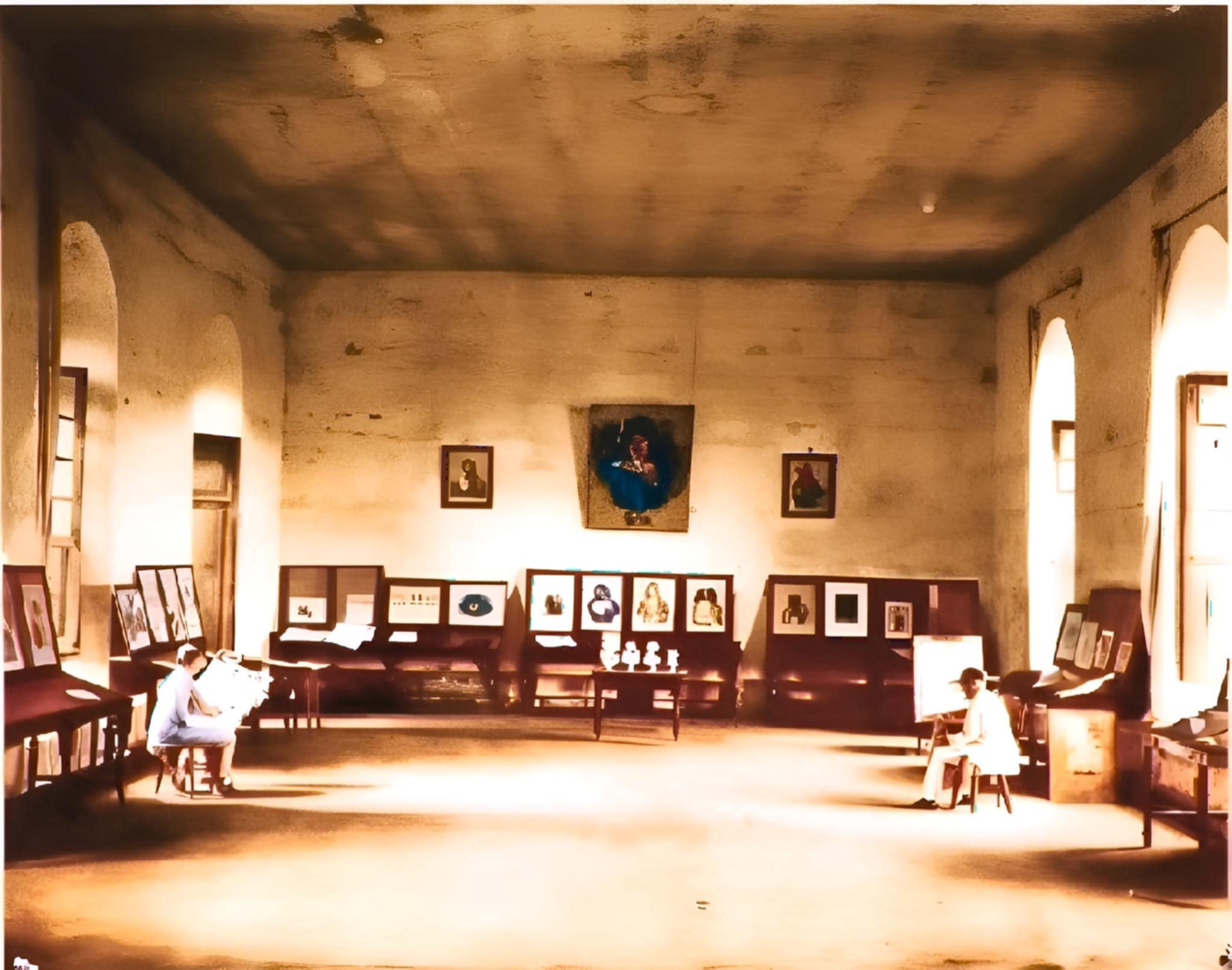
- Other names: Escuela Superior de Pintura, Escultura y Grabado (1891); UP College of Fine Arts (since 1908)
- Type: Art school
- Established: 1821
- Founders: Damián Domingo, Real Sociedad Economica Filipina de los Amigos del Pais
- Academic staff: Damian Domingo
- Students: Juan Luna, Félix Resurrección Hidalgo, Justiniano Asuncion, Rafael Enriquez
- Location: Manila, Spanish East Indies, present-day Philippines

The Academia de Dibujo y Pintura (English: Academy of Drawing and Painting) was an institution for artistic instruction in Manila, Philippines, founded in 1821 by Damián Domingo with the support of the Real Sociedad Economica Filipina de los Amigos del Pais. The academy closed in 1834 but re-opened in 1845 with funds bequeathed by Queen Isabela II. In 1891, the school would become known as the Escuela Superior de Pintura, Escultura y Grabado. While the Academia de Dibujo y Pintura refers distinctly to the institution established in 1821 and re-established in 1845 under the benefaction of the Sociedad Economica de los Amigos del Pais, it is officially considered to be the forerunner of the School of Fine Arts, which is the present-day College of Fine Arts of the University of the Philippines.

== History ==
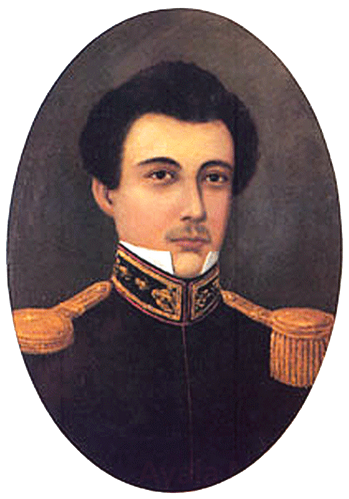
Damián Domingo

The possibility of creating a painting school in the Philippines was an idea that had emerged since the end of the 18th century during the administration of Governor-General José Basco y Vargas. This intention to build an art school, however, would not be realized during his term due to the precarious situation of the Spanish Empire at the time, which was confronted by civil unrest in the peninsula and in its colonies. One of his successor, Governor Rafael María de Aguilar y Ponce de León, wrote a letter to the Prince of Peace, Manuel Godoy, explaining the need to create a hospital, an astronomical observatory and an academy of drawing, affirming that "... good taste in the Arts and Crafts would grow and the Indians joining the rules to their facility in all kinds of works, could compete and even exceed the perfection of their works to the best thought and executed in Europe ..."

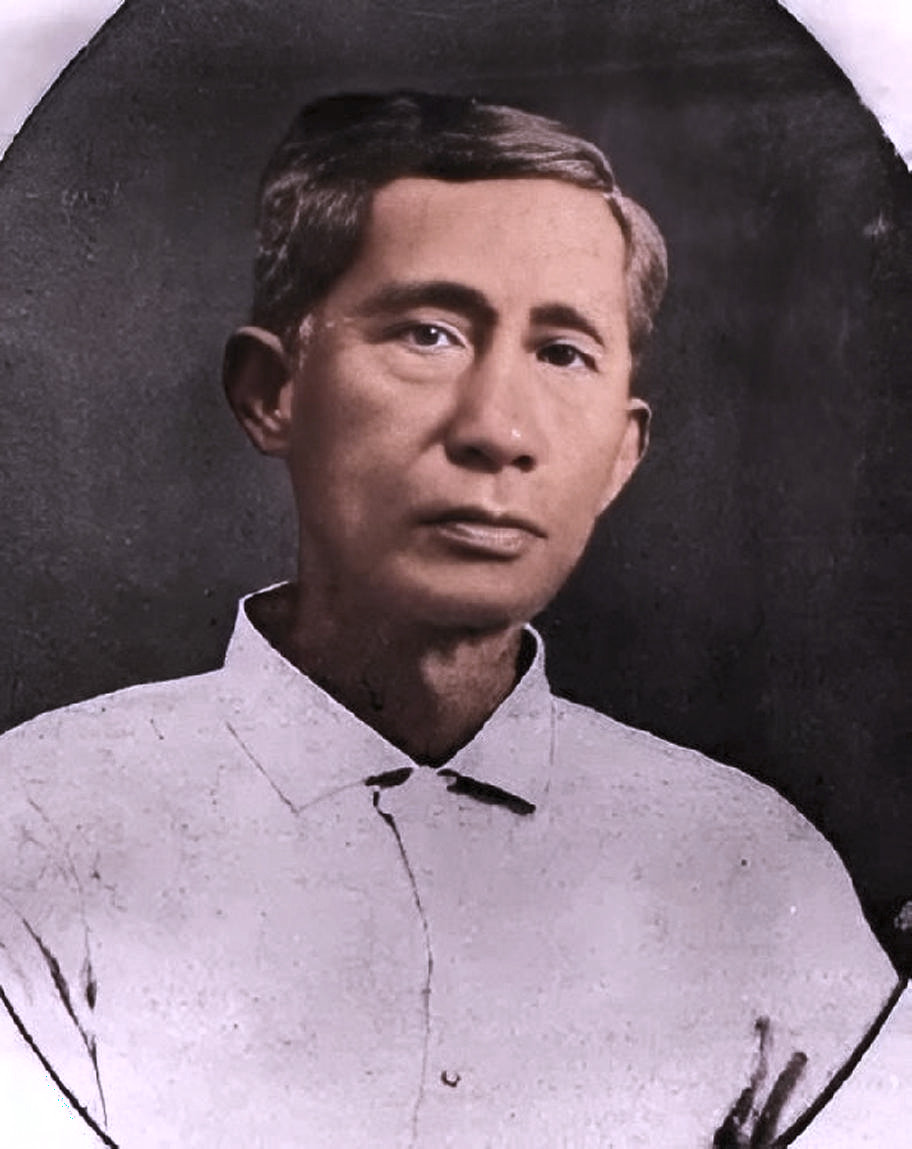
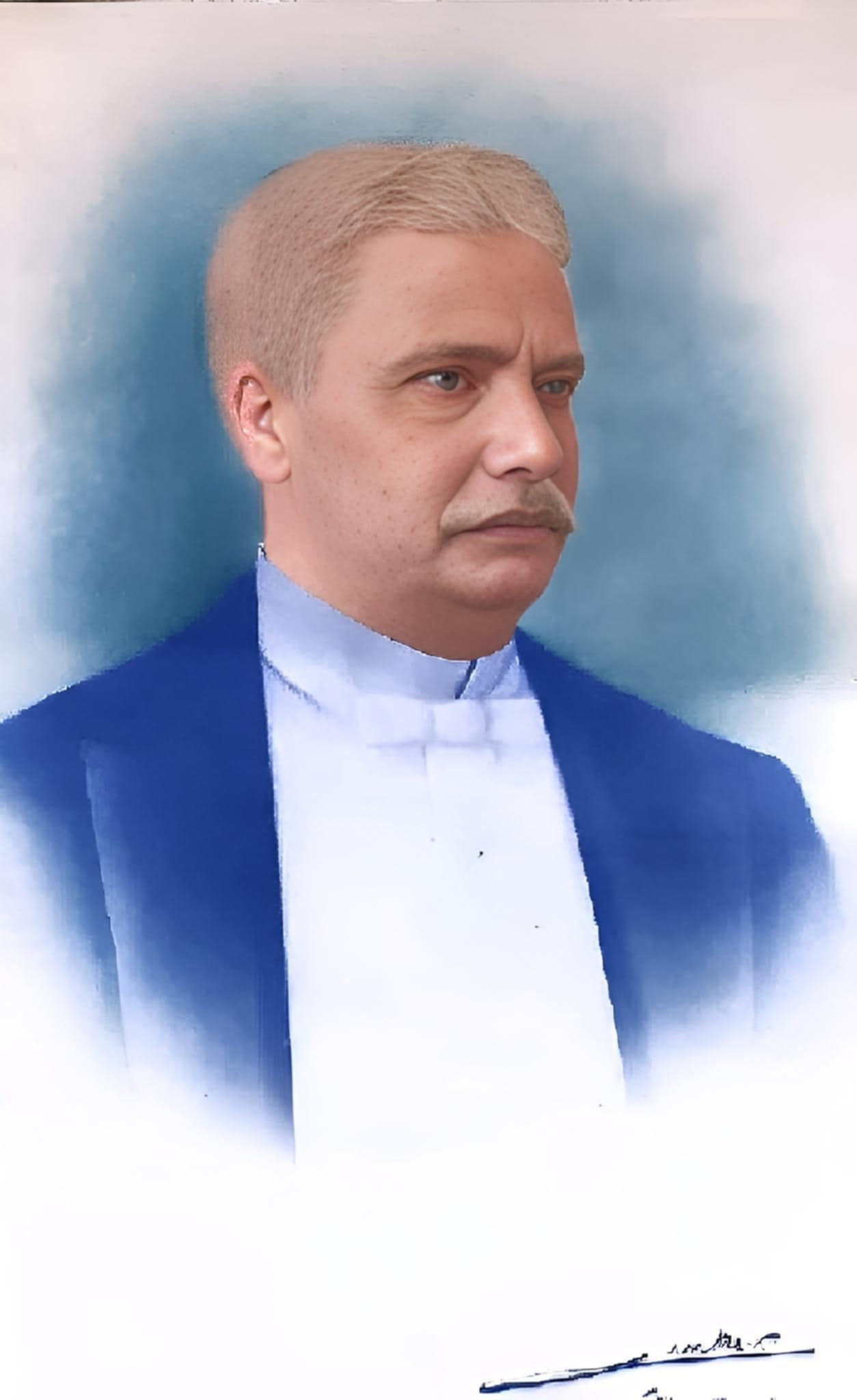
The two master painter instructors of Academia de Dibujo y Pintura; the Tagalog Native Filipino - Lorenzo Guerrero and the Insulares / Spanish Filipino - Lorenzo Rocha.

Despite earlier attempts to establish an art school, the first known in operation was founded in 1821 by a young Filipino painter, Damián Domingo, during a period of inactivity by the Real Sociedad Economica Filipina de los Amigos del Pais. The Manila Sociedad would later build its own art school, also named Academia de Dibujo y Pintura, but would be unsuccessful and would later move to absorb the one established by Domingo. The society offered the directorship of the school and a salary to Domingo in 1826.

== Structure ==
The academy is remarkable for being the first art school in the Philippines founded by a mestizo de sangley, who would later be described by Filipino propagandists as the "Primer Pintor Filipino" (the first Filipino painter). The academy was very prosperous with substantial enrollment to continue in operation for 13 years and was frequented by select students who belonged to the principal families of Manila, as well as some of the children of the school's director. Historian and biographer Carlos Quirino notes how Governor-General Mariano Ricafort visited the academy of Don Damian Domingo and personally acquainted himself with the progress of the school's students. The academy offered complete courses in drawing and in painting in watercolor and in oil, as well as the necessary lessons and practice in the preparation of colors and canvas.

== Notable alumni and faculty ==
This list of notable alumni and faculty only includes those who were members of the academy in the 19th century, before the Academia Dibujo y Pintura became the institution that was absorbed by the University of the Philippines through legislation by the Philippine National Assembly under the American colonial administration.

- Juan Luna
- Félix Resurrección Hidalgo
- Justiniano Asuncion
- Simon Flores
- Pelagia Mendoza y Gotianquin (1867–1939), the first woman student at the Escuela de Dibujo y Pintura.
