= Miguel Piernavieja del Pozo =

Spanish spy for Nazi Germany

Miguel Piernavieja del Pozo

Miguel Piernavieja del Pozo (21 May 1916 – 8 June 1983) was a Spanish spy for Nazi Germany, operating in Britain during the Second World War. He was quickly spotted by the Security Services (MI5) who gave him the codename Pogo and used one of their double-agents to feed him disinformation which was relayed to the Germans.

== Spanish Civil War ==
Born in Santa Cruz de Tenerife on 21 May 1916, Piernavieja was a Falangist who had worked for Francisco Franco during the Spanish Civil War.

== Spying in Britain ==
In 1940, the British Embassy in Madrid, with the personal recommendation of British ambassador Samuel Hoare, arranged for Piernavieja to travel to Britain as an observer for a Madrid-based study group. He arrived in Britain on 29 September 1940. Piernavieja was contacted by Gwylm Williams, who had tried to work for the Germans in 1939 but had been recruited as a double-agent by MI5 instead. Williams posed as an ardent Welsh nationalist and Piernavieja gave him £3900 (a sum more than 10x the average annual wage) in a talcum-powder tin and asked him to obtain information on the Welsh nationalist movement and on factories making munitions in the west of England. According to Williams, Piernavieja had asked him to make plans for sabotage.

== War service ==
Piernavieja was awarded the Iron Cross for his military service in the Division Azul on the Eastern Front. He returned to Spain in January 1941.

== Selected publications ==
- El Deporte en la Literatura Latina. Madrid, 1960.
