= Carmen Guerrero Nakpil =

Filipina writer, historian and public servant (1922–2018)

Carmen Guerrero Nákpil

4th Chairperson of the National Historical Commission of the Philippines
- In office July 1967 – 1971
- Appointed by: Ferdinand Marcos
- Preceded by: Encarnación Alzona
- Succeeded by: Esteban A. de Ocampo

Director-General of the Technology Resource Center
- In office 1975–1985
- Appointed by: Ferdinand Marcos

Personal details
- Born: María Carmen Lucía Guerrero y Francisco; July 19, 1922 Ermita, Manila, Philippine Islands
- Died: July 30, 2018 (aged 96) Makati, Philippines
- Resting place: Loyola Memorial Park, Marikina, Philippines
- Spouses: Ismaél A. Cruz (m. 1942; died 1945) Ángel E. Nákpil (m. 1950; died 1980)
- Relations: Leon Ma. Guerrero III (brother); León María Guerrero (grandfather)
- Children: 5, including Gemma Cruz-Araneta (plus 2 stepdaughters)
- Education: Saint Theresa's College of Quezon City
- Occupation: Public historian; cultural administrator; journalist; author

Carmen Guerrero Nákpil (born Carmen Francisco Guerrero; 19 July 1922 – 30 July 30, 2018) was a Filipina journalist, author, historian and public servant. She was a recipient of the Southeast Asian Writer's Award.

== Early life and education ==
Carmen Guerrero was born in Ermita, Manila, on July 19, 1922. Her family were painters and poets, as well as scientists and doctors.

Her parents were the prominent doctor Alfredo Guerrero and Filomena Francisco, who was celebrated as one of the Philippines' first female pharmacists.

Her paternal grandfather was León María Guerrero, a noted botanist. He was the younger brother of the painter Lorenzo Guerrero, who mentored Juan Luna.

Her maternal grandfather was Gabriel Beato Francisco, a Tagalog writer, journalist, novelist, playwright. Francisco's contribution to the development of Tagalog literature lies in the novel.

She studied at St. Theresa's College, Manila and graduated with a Bachelor of Arts degree in 1942.

== Career ==
At Saint Theresa's, she edited the campus newspaper, The Orion as well as teaching literature. After being widowed in World War II she took a job as a proofreader before working her way up to be an editor and columnist. She was the only woman with a column in the Manila Chronicle, where she acquired the nickname "Chitang". The column ran for twelve years In 1966 she left the Chronicle for the Sunday Times Magazine of The Manila Times, where she had a weekly column called 'Consensus of One'. She also worked on several papers and magazines including the Evening News, The Philippines Herald, Asia magazine, and Malaya.

During Ferdinand Marcos' presidency, Guerrero-Nákpil supported his regime and accompanied Imelda Marcos on her overseas trips. She also wrote under the byline Filosofo Tasso. She subsequently said she did this to protect her daughter Gemma Cruz Araneta and her son-in-law.

She wrote lectures, essays and short stories to other publications in the Philippines and the rest of the world. She won the Gawad Pambansang Alagad ni Balagtas Award for English fiction in 1988, and the SEA Write Award and the National Book Award in 1990.

In the 1960s, she served as Chairman of the Philippine National Historical Commission. From 1975 to 1985 she was director-general of the Technology Resource Center. She was elected to the Executive Board of the UNESCO, Paris in 1983 and served for three years. In the 1990s she was also the chair of the Manila Historical Commission.

=== Selected works ===
==== Nonfiction ====
- Woman Enough: and Other Essays (1963)
- Question of Identity (1973)
- The Philippines and the Filipino (1977)
- The Philippines - The Land and the People (1989)
- Heroes and Villains (2010)

==== Autobiographical trilogy ====
- Myself, Elsewhere (2006)
- Legends and Adventures (2007)
- Exeunt (2009)

==== Fiction ====
- The Rice Conspiracy: A Novel (1990)

== Personal life ==
Guerrero first married Ismaél A. Cruz in August 1942. They had two children, Gemma Cruz-Araneta and Ismaél G. Cruz, before Ismaél was killed in 1945.

In 1950, she married architect and city planner Ángel E. Nákpil. She had three more children (Ramón, Lisa, and Luis), and gained two step-daughters (Nina Nákpil-Campos and Carmina Nákpil-Dualan)

Her brothers included lawyer and diplomat León María Guerrero III, and Mario X. Guerrero, who was one of the country's first foreign-trained cardiologists.

In 2024, her daughter Lisa took on her mother's previous role as Chair of the National Historical Commission of the Philippines.

== Death ==
Guerrero-Nákpil died on 30 July 2018, of pneumonia, at the age of 96. She was laid to rest at the Loyola Memorial Park in Marikina, following a wake on 31 July and a funeral mass on 2 August.
