= Lorenzo Maria Guerrero =

Filipino painter and teacher (1835–1994)

Lorenzo Guerrero
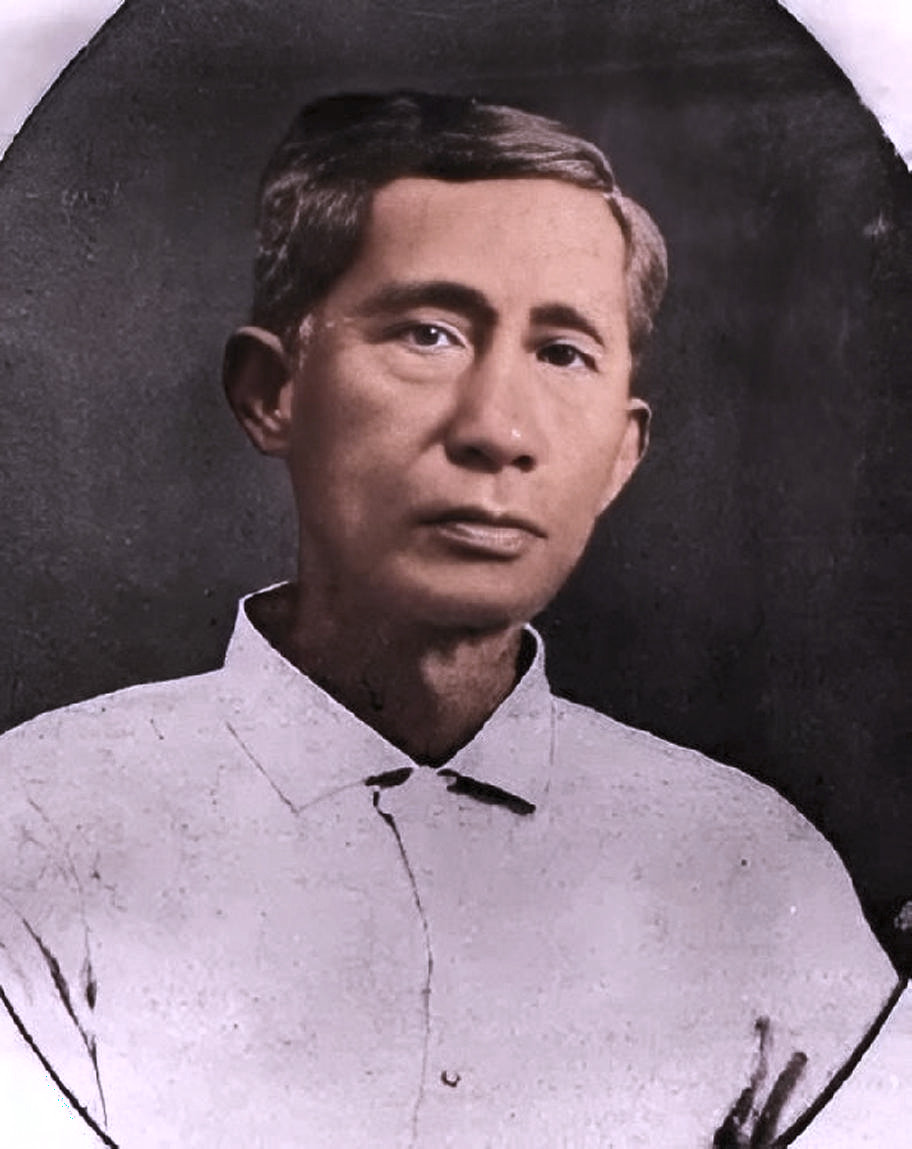
- Born: Lorenzo Maria Guerrero; November 4, 1835; Tondo, Captaincy General of the Philippines
- Died: April 8, 1904 (aged 68)
- Education: Colegio de San José; Academia de Dibujo
- Occupations: Painter, teacher
- Spouse: Clemencia Ramirez
- Children: 9
- Relatives: León María Guerrero (brother); Fernando María Guerrero (son)

Lorenzo Guerrero (November 4, 1835 – April 8, 1904) was a Filipino painter and teacher.

== Early life and education ==
Lorenzo María Guerrero y Leogardo was born on November 4, 1835, in Ermita in what was then the province of Tondo. He was the second of fourteen children of León Jorge Guerrero and Clara Leogardo and is an older brother of the botanist León María Guerrero.

He is the father of the poet, journalist, lawyer, politician, and polyglot Fernando María Guerrero, who was one of the most prominent Spanish-language poets of the Philippines. They belong to a prominent family in Ermita.

During the term of Nicolás Valdés y Fernández as the head of Academia de Dibujo, he won the half of a 300-peso reward from the Junta for one of the two best paintings – the Likeness of Magellan, made by Guerrero; and the Portrait of the Queen, made by Lorenzo Rocha. Their canvases were permanently displayed at the Junta's session hall 13. The 300 pesos were equally divided between both winners.

Guerrero studied Latin at the Colegio de San José and took lessons from several Spanish painters, including Agustín Sáez y Glanadell in the Academia de Dibujo art school.

== Career ==
Guerrero began teaching drawing at the age of sixteen and later taught at the Academia de Dibujo y Pintura as assistant to his fellow-winner Rocha, who was now its interim professor and director, together with Agustín Sáez, after Nicolás Valdés went back to Spain in early 1857. He also began teaching at the Instituto de Mujeres, and several other schools.

He also gave private lessons, mainly to sons and daughters of prominent families in and around Manila. Among his students were painter Juan Luna and architects Juan M. Arellano and Andrés Luna de San Pedro.

Guerrero's home in Ermita became a gathering place for artists and writers, including Fabián de la Rosa, Epifanio de los Santos, and Jaime C. de Veyra, and students from the Colegio de Nuestra Señora de Guía, a school where his sister-in-law, Corinta Ramirez, was principal. Guerrero gave them advice and criticism there.

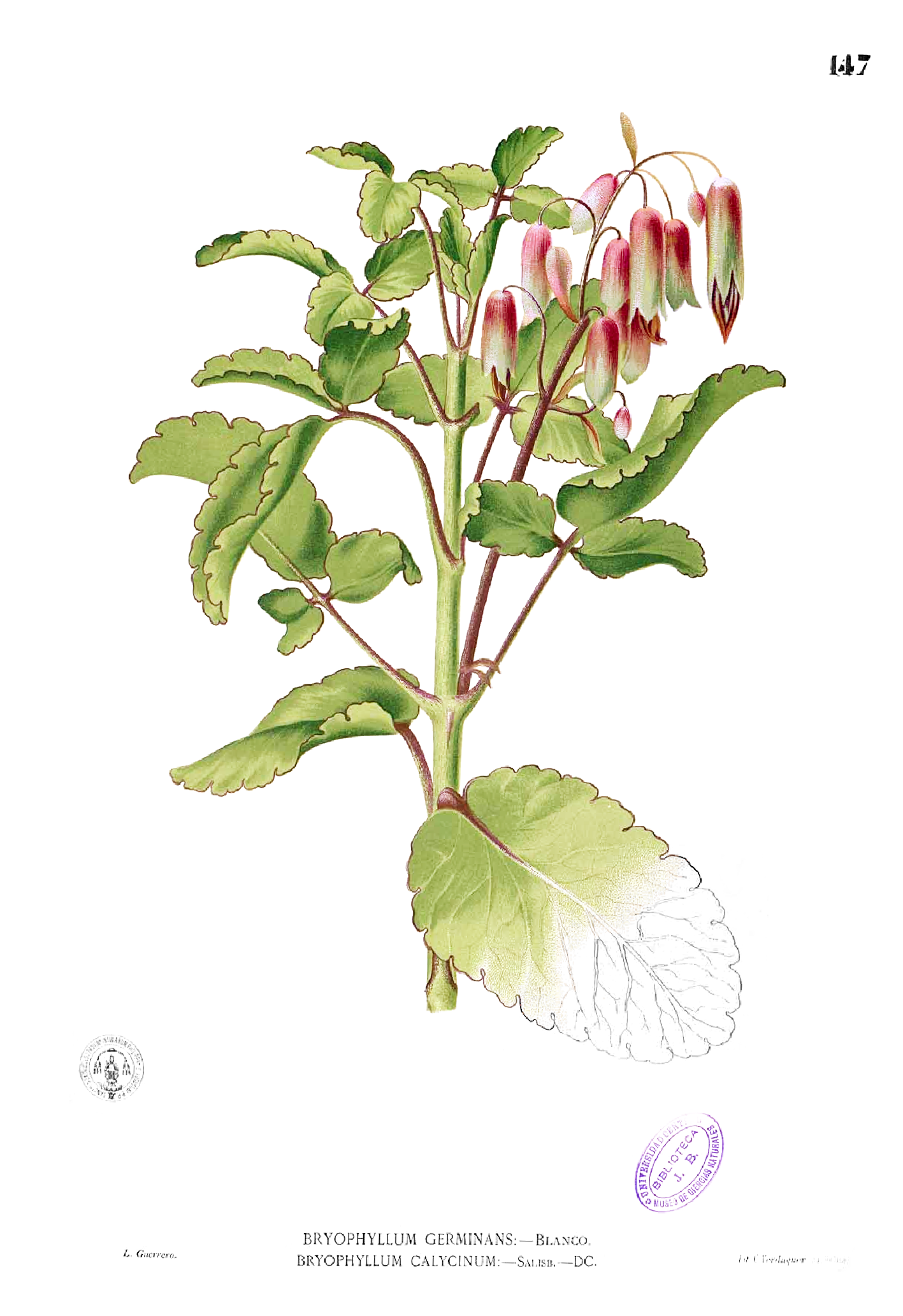
One of Guerrero's illustrations in Flora de Filipinas

Guerrero himself painted works of a religious nature and everyday scenes and events. Not many of these have been preserved. Examples of paintings from the religious genre are Nuestra Señora de Guia, Dolorosa, Santa Verónica de Julianus, Saint John the Baptist (1886) and San Félix de Cantalicio. Examples of paintings of a non-religious nature are Chinese Vendor of Tsin-Tsao, River's Bend and Scene at a Brook, all three of which were on display at the Louisiana Purchase Exposition in 1904 in the American city of St. Louis. Other works by him include The Bride and Bodegon (1877), which was once on display in the National Museum of Fine Arts, located in Manila.

Guerrero also drew 35 of the 253 illustrations in Flora de Filipinas by friar Manuel Blanco.

== Personal life ==
He was married to Clemencia Ramírez. They had nine children. Three of them reached adulthood: Fernando María Guerrero; Manuel María Guerrero, a physician; and daughter, Araceli.

Guerrero died in 1904 at the age of 68 from an asthmatic attack.
