= Lourdes Santiago Torres Leon Guerrero =

Guamanian teacher

Lourdes Santiago Torres Leon Guerrero (9 November 1923, Merizo - 25 February 2010) was a teacher in Guam. Considered a "premiere educator", she was posthumously inducted into Guam's Educator's Hall of Fame.

Guerrero worked for almost six decades as a school teacher at Maxwell School, Merizo Elementary School, Sinajana Elementary School, Talofofo Elementary School, Santa Rita Elementary School, and John F. Kennedy, George Washington, Oceanview and Simon Sanchez high schools.
