= León María Guerrero (diplomat) =

Filipino diplomat and novelist (1915–1982)

León María Guerrero III GCrM KGCR
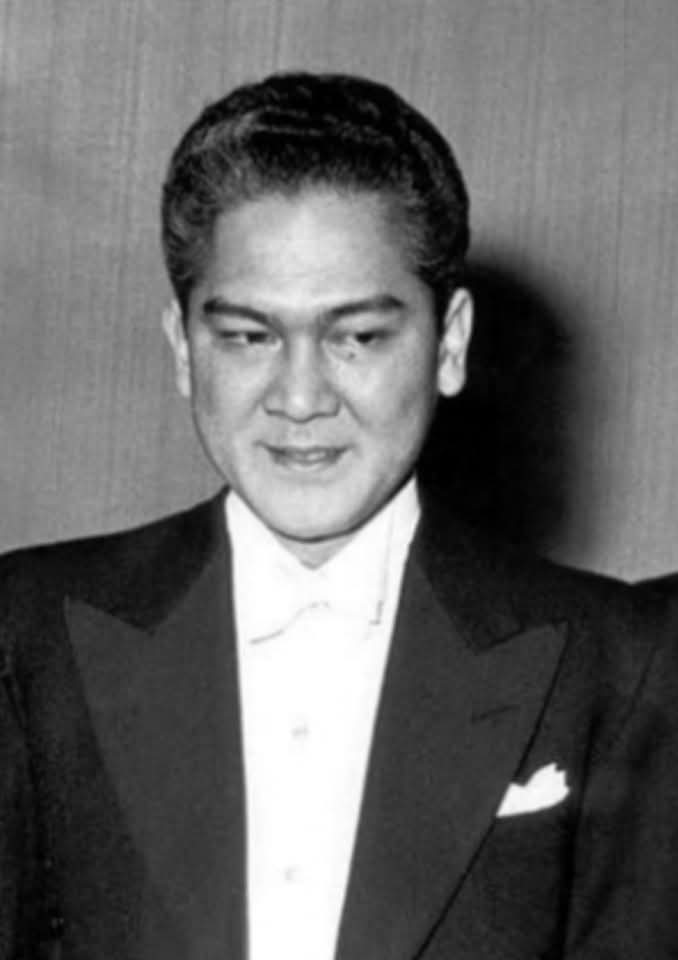

Ambassador of the Philippines to Yugoslavia
- In office 1977–1980
- President: Ferdinand Marcos

Ambassador of the Philippines to Mexico
- In office 1973–1977
- President: Ferdinand Marcos

Ambassador of the Philippines to India
- In office 1966–1973
- President: Ferdinand Marcos

Ambassador of the Philippines to Spain
- In office April 13, 1962 – June 12, 1966
- President: Carlos P. Garcia; Diosdado Macapagal; Ferdinand Marcos
- Preceded by: Pedro Hernaez
- Succeeded by: Luis Gonzalez

Ambassador Extraordinary and Plenipotentiary of the Republic of the Philippines to the Court of St. James
- In office 1954–1962
- President: Ramon Magsaysay; Carlos P. Garcia; Diosdado Macapagal
- Preceded by: José E. Romero
- Succeeded by: Melquiades Gamboa

Undersecretary for the Department of Foreign Affairs
- In office 1954–?
- President: Ramon Magsaysay

Personal details
- Born: León María Ignacio Agapito Guerrero y Francisco; 24 March 1915 Ermita, Manila, Philippine Islands
- Died: 24 June 1982 (aged 67) Manila, Philippines
- Resting place: Loyola Memorial Park, Marikina, Philippines
- Spouse: Anita Escaño Corominas (m. 1938; died 1971) Margaret Rose Burke (m. 1972)
- Relations: Carmen Guerrero Nakpil (sister); Gemma Cruz-Araneta (niece); León María Guerrero (grandfather)
- Education: Ateneo de Manila University; Philippine Law School
- Occupation: Diplomat, writer
- Profession: Lawyer
- Website: www.guerreropublishing.com

León María Ignacio Agapito Guerrero y Francisco, GCrM KGCR (March 24, 1915 – June 24, 1982), better known simply as Leon Ma. Guerrero III, was a Filipino diplomat and novelist, and was one of the foremost Filipino nationalists of his era. A partner in the law practice of senator Claro M. Recto, he became Undersecretary of Foreign Affairs during the Magsaysay administration. His then controversial advocacy of Asia for the Asians and espousal of a realistic re-examination of relations with the United States are now commonly accepted as being ahead of their time.

== Early life and education ==
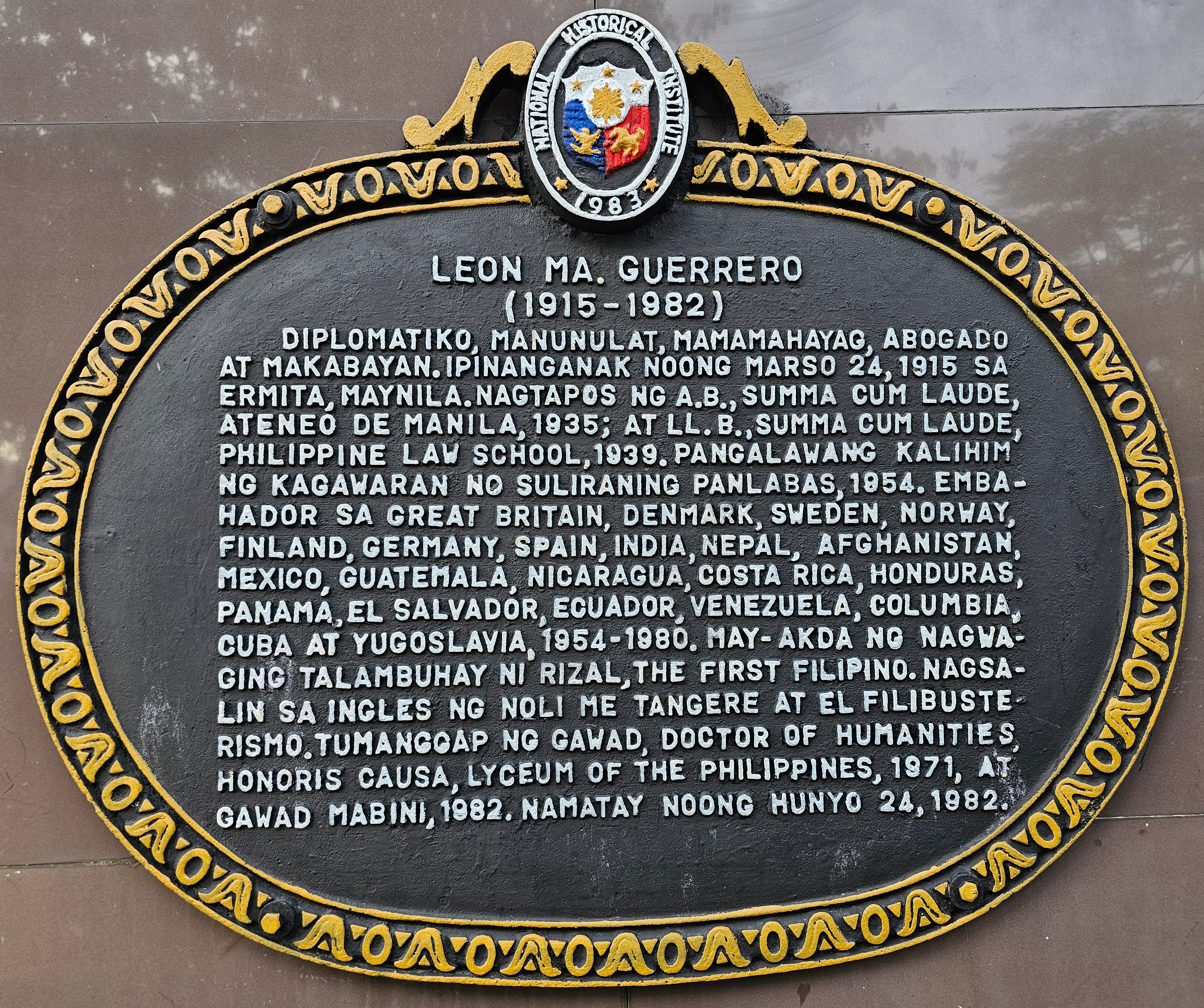
Historical marker for Guerrero installed in Ermita, Manila in 1983

Leoni, as he was called within his family, was born on 24 March 1915 in Ermita, Manila to one of the nation's most prominent families. His parents were Dr. Alfredo León Guerrero and Filomena Francisco, the first Filipino woman pharmacist. His sister, Carmen Guerrero Nakpil, would also be grow up to be a journalist and one of the most preeminent figures in Philippine letters. His paternal grandfather was León María Guerrero y Leogardo, a distinguished pharmacist and botanist, Malolos Congress delegate and member of the first Philippine Assembly. His maternal grandfather was Gabriel Beato Francisco, a journalist who had been manager of El Comercio, the foremost mercantile newspaper during the Spanish regime.

During enrolment for high school, Guerrero met Horacio de la Costa, who was hailing from Tayabas, Quezon. The two of them would become very close friends later on. In his high school days, Leoni had studied under the Classical Latin Programme as well as English literature and composition, algebra, American history and civics, Philippine history and government, economics, religion, public speaking (including debate and military drills) and physical science. Due to his meritorious achievements, his mother would put his medals in a box and safekept it in an aparador.

It was through the Guidon, the student publication of the Ateneo de Manila University, that Leoni, Horacio de la Costa and Jesus A. Paredes, Jr. had cemented their lifelong friendship. Initially, the three of them were staffs, but later on became the publication's editors.

In 1938, he married Anita Escaño Corominas of Cebu. She was the daughter of Don Jose Corominas and Doña Paz Escaño. Her maternal grandparents were Don Fernando Escaño and Doña Agustina Faelnar. Her paternal grandparents were Don Benito Marcellan Coromina and Doña Soledad Reyes. Her niece was married to the son of José E. Romero, the first Philippine ambassador to the Court of St. James's.

In 1954, Guerrero was sworn in as Undersecretary of Foreign Affairs by then-President Ramon Magsaysay and Vice President-elect Carlos P. Garcia. He, also succeeded Felipe Neri as the president's special adviser in foreign affairs.

== Later life ==
On retirement he was the country's senior career diplomat, having served as ambassador in London, Madrid, New Delhi, Mexico City and Belgrade. On June 19, 1982, only a few days before he died, he received the, Gawad Mabini, the highest award in the Philippine Foreign Service.

He held the rank of Knight Grand Cross of the Knights of Rizal. Among his many works are internationally acclaimed translations of José Rizal's Noli Me Tángere and El filibusterismo. He also wrote a biography of Rizal titled The First Filipino.

== Works ==
- Twilight in Tokyo (1946)
- Passion and Death of the USAFFE (1947)
- Report from Europe (1951)
- Alternatives for Asians (1957)
- An Asian on Asia (1958)
- The First Filipino (1962) (Awarded first prize in the Rizal Biography Contest under the auspices of the José Rizal National Centennial Commission.)
- El Si y El No. (1963) (Winner of the Premio Zobel)
- Las Dos Muertes de General Aguinaldo (1964)
- Two Friars in Exodus (A Contribution to Studies in Philippine Church History) (1969)
- The Philippine Revolution by Apolinario Mabini (1969)
- Today Began Yesterday (1975)
- We Filipinos (1984) (Posthumous anthology of his writings)

=== Translations ===
- Noli Me Tangere, by José Rizal (1961)
- El Filibusterismo, by José Rizal (1962)

== Honors and awards ==
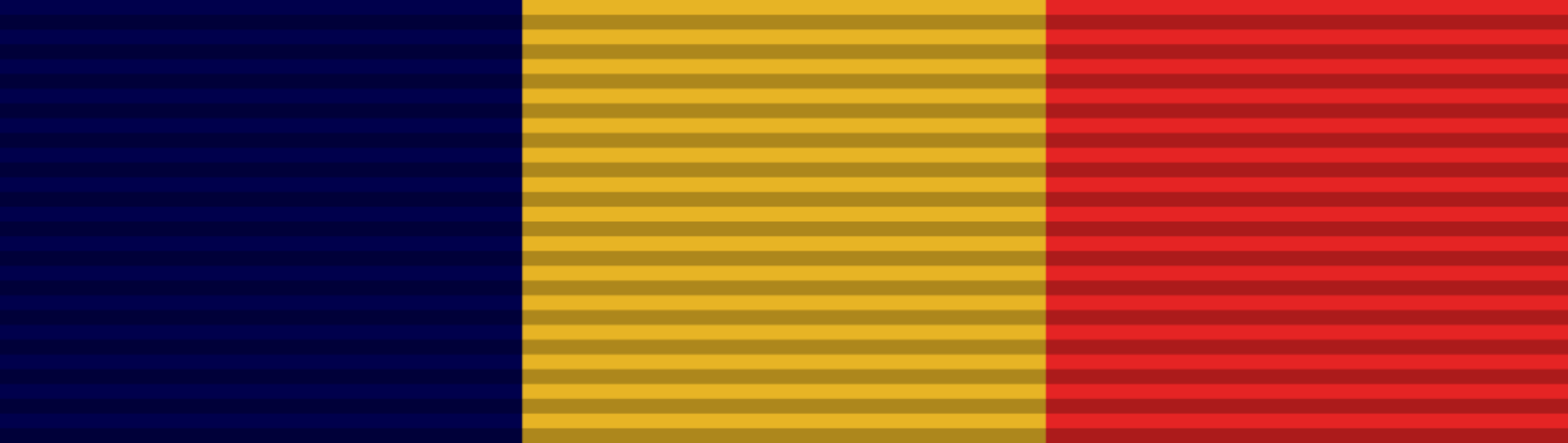
- : Grand Cross (Dakilang Kamanong) of the Gawad Mabini, 1982
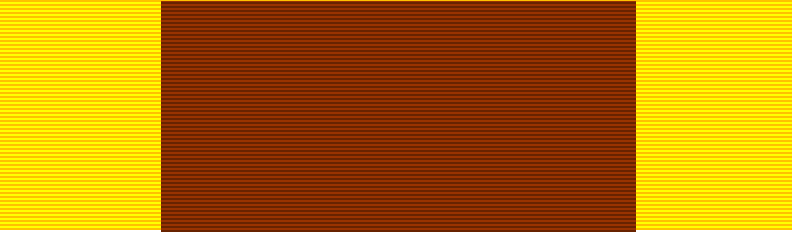
- : The Order of the Knights of Rizal, Knight Grand Cross of Rizal (KGCR).
