= León María Guerrero (botanist) =

Filipino politician and scientist (1853–1935)

The Honourable León María Guerrero
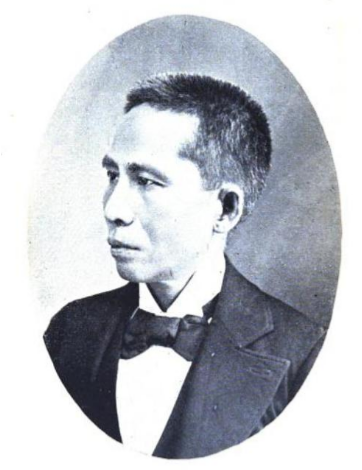
- Guerrero as a member of the Philippine Assembly, 1908

Member of the Philippine Assembly from Bulacan's 2nd district
- In office 1907–1909
- Preceded by: District established
- Succeeded by: Mariano Ponce

Minister of Agriculture, Industry and Commerce
- In office May 7, 1899 – November 13, 1899
- President: Emilio Aguinaldo
- Preceded by: Graciano Gonzaga
- Succeeded by: Department demoted (Note: In 1902, the department was demoted to a bureau, the Bureau of Agriculture, subordinate to the Department of the Interior. The title was next held by Galicano Apacible as Secretary of Agriculture and Natural Resources and by William Cameron Forbes as Secretary of Commerce and Police.)

Member of the Malolos Congress from Davao
- In office September 15, 1898 – November 13, 1899 Serving with Ceferino Pantoja

Personal details
- Born: León María Guerrero y Leogardo; January 21, 1853 Ermita, Manila, Captaincy General of the Philippines
- Died: April 13, 1935 (aged 82) Manila, Philippines
- Citizenship: Filipino
- Party: Nacionalista
- Spouse: Aurora Rodriguez
- Relations: León Ma. Guerrero III (grandson); Carmen Guerrero Nakpil (granddaughter); Gemma Cruz-Araneta (great-granddaughter)
- Children: Cesar Maria Guerrero; Alfredo León Guerrero
- Education: University of Santo Tomas (BS)
- Occupation: Writer, politician
- Profession: Pharmacological botanist

León María Guerrero y Leogardo (January 21, 1853 – April 13, 1935) was a Filipino writer, revolutionary leader, politician, the first licensed pharmacist in the Philippines, and one of the most eminent botanists in the country during the late Spanish colonial period. He is considered to be the "Father of Philippine Pharmacy" due to his extensive studies on local medicinal plants. He is also dubbed as the "Father of Philippine Botany" by Filipino historian Gregorio F. Zaide.

== Early life ==
León María was one of the 14 children of León Jorge Guerrero and Clara Leogardo. He was born on January 21, 1853, in Ermita, Manila. His brother, Lorenzo Guerrero, became a painter and a teacher of Juan Luna. He painted the altar of the San Sebastian Church in Quiapo, Manila. León Maria was the uncle of poet-politician, Fernando María Guerrero, who won a seat at the Philippine Assembly in 1907. He is the grandfather of diplomat León María Guerrero III (his namesake) and pre-eminent writer Carmen Guerrero Nakpil.

Being a scion of one of the most prominent families of Manila during the last years of Spanish colonial period, he was among the first students of the Ateneo de Manila University when it was founded in 1859 and known as the Ateneo Municipal de Manila. After completing his primary and secondary education, he enrolled at the University of Santo Tomas, where he graduated in 1875 with a degree Bachelor of Science in Pharmacy, specializing in Botany and Zoology. The following year, he was licensed to practice Pharmacy.

Guerrero was appointed head of the military pharmacy in Zamboanga City and at the marine hospital in Kawit, Cavite. Later, he would manage the popular Binondo Pharmacy in Manila.

His scientific curiosity led him to study the therapeutic uses of Philippine plants, from which he extracted pharmacological ingredients.

== Early career ==
In 1889, he was appointed member of the council of health of the Manila City Council and was enrolled as a member of the Sociedad Española de Historia Natural. He was also invited to be an auditor and associate of the La Revista Internacional de Farmacografia.

His accomplishments also earned him an appointment as chemical expert of the Audiencia Real, the supreme court during the Spanish colonial period.

He also pursued special studies in ornithology and lepidopterology, securing him a position as zoologist in the forestry bureau of the Spanish colonial government.

== Political involvement ==
=== Revolutionary leader ===
Despite his links to the colonial bureaucracy, Guerrero openly joined the independence struggle when the Philippine Revolution of 1896 broke out.

He was named professor of Pharmacy of the Universidad Literaria de Filipinas, which was founded by the Philippine Revolutionary Government on October 19, 1898. He was a member of the Malolos Congress and the Malolos Constitution. This gave birth to the First Philippine Republic.

While serving as professor at the literary university which was then based in Bulacan and Tarlac provinces, he also contributed to La Independencia, the official organ of the revolutionary movement, edited by revolutionary general Antonio Luna.

When President Emilio Aguinaldo formed his cabinet in 1899, he named Guerrero secretary of agriculture, industry and commerce.

=== Politician ===
After the collapse of the First Philippine Republic, Guerrero returned to Manila. He was among the former revolutionists who founded the Asociacion de Paz to re-establish peace in the country. He was among the founders of the Partido Democrata (Democratic Party) which advocated absolute Philippine independence from the United States, but through peaceful means.

He was among those who founded the Liceo de Manila and became its president until May 1903. He became chairman of the board of the Pharmaceutical Union and member of the American Pharmaceutical Society.

In 1907, he was elected delegate to the First Philippine Assembly and named president of the committee on public instruction which entitled him to a seat in the board of regents of the University of the Philippines, which would be established the following year.

== Educator ==
After his stint in national politics, Guerrero returned to teaching and became dean of the Faculty of Pharmacy of the University of Santo Tomas. He also served as assistant director of the Bureau of Census and an official of the Bureau of Science.

== Research ==
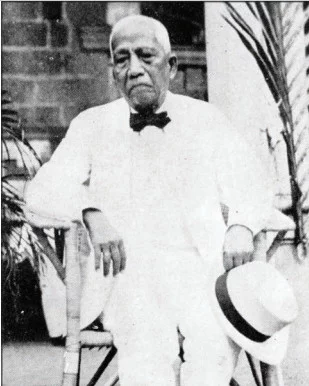
Guerrero in his later years

During the American occupation, he compiled data on Philippine medicinal plants. In 1903, he published his paper, Medicinal Plants of the Philippine Islands which made pharmacology a basic medical science in the Philippines. He also authored a study on "Medicinal Plants" in 1918. It contains 174 types of plants with medicinal properties. His work was prepared for publication by Dr. W. H. Brown for the Bureau of Forestry.

Some of his important works are Notas Preliminares Sobre Las Materiales Colorantes Vegetales de Filipinas, Drogas Vegetales de Filipinas, and Medicinal Uses of Philippine Plants.

== Honors ==
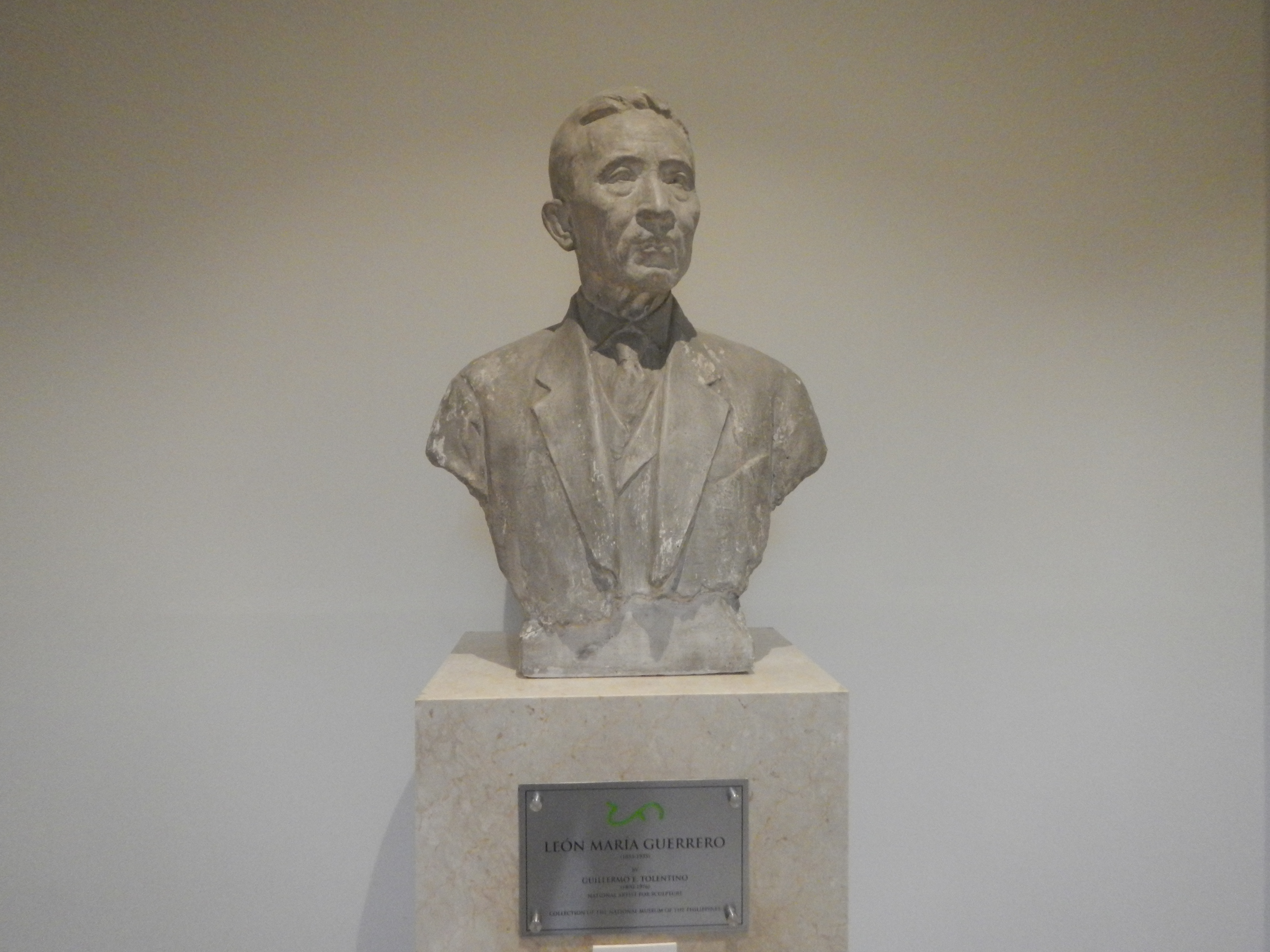
Bust of Guerrero at National Museum of Natural History Manila

In recognition of his work in botany, taxonomists named a genus of plants, Guerreroia monocephala, and a species of orchids, Dendrobium guerreroi, in his honor.

In 1921, the University of the Philippines conferred on Guerrero a degree of Doctor of Science honoris causa.

Guerrero died on April 13, 1935, at the age of 82. He was survived by his wife Aurora Domínguez, and sons, Cesar María, a bishop, and Alfredo Leon Maria, a physician.

Guerrero's daughter-in-law, and Alfredo's wife, Filomena Francisco, was his pupil, and became the first female pharmacist of the Philippines.
