= Arellano (surname) =

Arellano is a Spanish surname. Notable people with the surname include:

- Agnes Arellano (born 1949), Filipina sculptor
- Alonso de Arellano, Spanish explorer
- Arcadio Arellano (1872–1920), Filipino architect
- Carlos Arellano Lennox (1928–2025), Panamanian marine biologist and politician
- Cayetano Arellano (1847–1920), the first Chief Justice of the Supreme Court of the Republic of the Philippines
- Deodato Arellano (1844–1899), Filipino patriot, propagandist and the first president of the Supreme Council of the Katipunan during the Philippine Revolution against Spain
- Drew Arellano (born 1980), Filipino TV host, and actor
- Elvira Arellano (born 1975), illegal Mexican immigrant to the USA
- Erasma Arellano, Filipino track and field athlete
- Gustavo Arellano, publisher and editor
- Jesús Arellano (born 1973), Mexican football player
- Joaquin Ramirez de Arellano, lawyer, professor and journalist
- José Ramirez de Arellano (1705–1770), Spanish architect and sculptor of the Baroque
- Juan de Arellano (1614–1676), Spanish painter
- Juan M. Arellano (1888–1960), Filipino architect
- Juan Ramirez de Arellano (1725–1782), Spanish painter of the Baroque Era
- Luis Arellano (born 1989), Venezuelan footballer who plays for a Spanish club CF Badalona, as a goalkeeper
- Manuel Arellano (born 1957), Spanish economist
- Marcy Arellano (born 1986), Filipino basketball player
- Omar Arellano (born 1987), Mexican football player
- Oswaldo López Arellano (1921–2010), former President of Honduras
- Prospero Nale Arellano (1937–2014), Filipino Roman Catholic bishop
- Raul Arellano (1935–1997), Mexican football forward who played for Mexico in the 1954 FIFA World Cup
- Robert Arellano, American author.
- Tristán de Luna y Arellano (1510-1573), Spanish explorer and conquistador of the 16th century

== See also ==
- Arellanes
