= Carlos Arellano =

Carlos Arellano may refer to:

- Carlos Arellano (athlete), Ecuadorian runner, competed in the 2014 South American Cross Country Championships
- Carlos Arellano Baeza (born 1957), Chilean politician, affiliated with the Christian Democratic Party
- Carlos Arellano Félix (born 1955), Mexican medical doctor, involved with the Tijuana Cartel
- Carlos Arellano Lennox (1928–2025), Panamanian marine biologist and politician
