= Arellano =

Arellano may refer to:

- Arellano University, a large university in Manila, Philippines
- Arellano, Navarre, a municipality in Navarre, Spain
- Arellano (surname)
