= Carlos Arellano Lennox =

Panamanian marine biologist and politician (1928–2025)

Personal details
- Born: 22 July 1928 Panama City, Panama
- Died: 19 January 2025 (aged 96)
- Party: Christian Democratic Party
- Known for: Operation Sovereignty

Carlos Arellano Lennox (Note: In this Hispanic American name, the first or paternal surname is Arellano and the second or maternal family name is Lennox.) (22 July 1928 – 19 January 2025) was a Panamanian marine biologist and politician. As a student leader he organised the nationalist protest against the U.S. presence in the Panama Canal Zone known as Operation Sovereignty, which consisted of the surprise planting of Panamanian flags at various points in the Zone on 2 May 1958. As a politician, he was involved with the Christian Democratic Party (PDC) since its founding in 1960. He was elected to two terms in the National Assembly and was its president in 1990. Arellano died on 19 January 2025, at the age of 96.

== Student activism ==
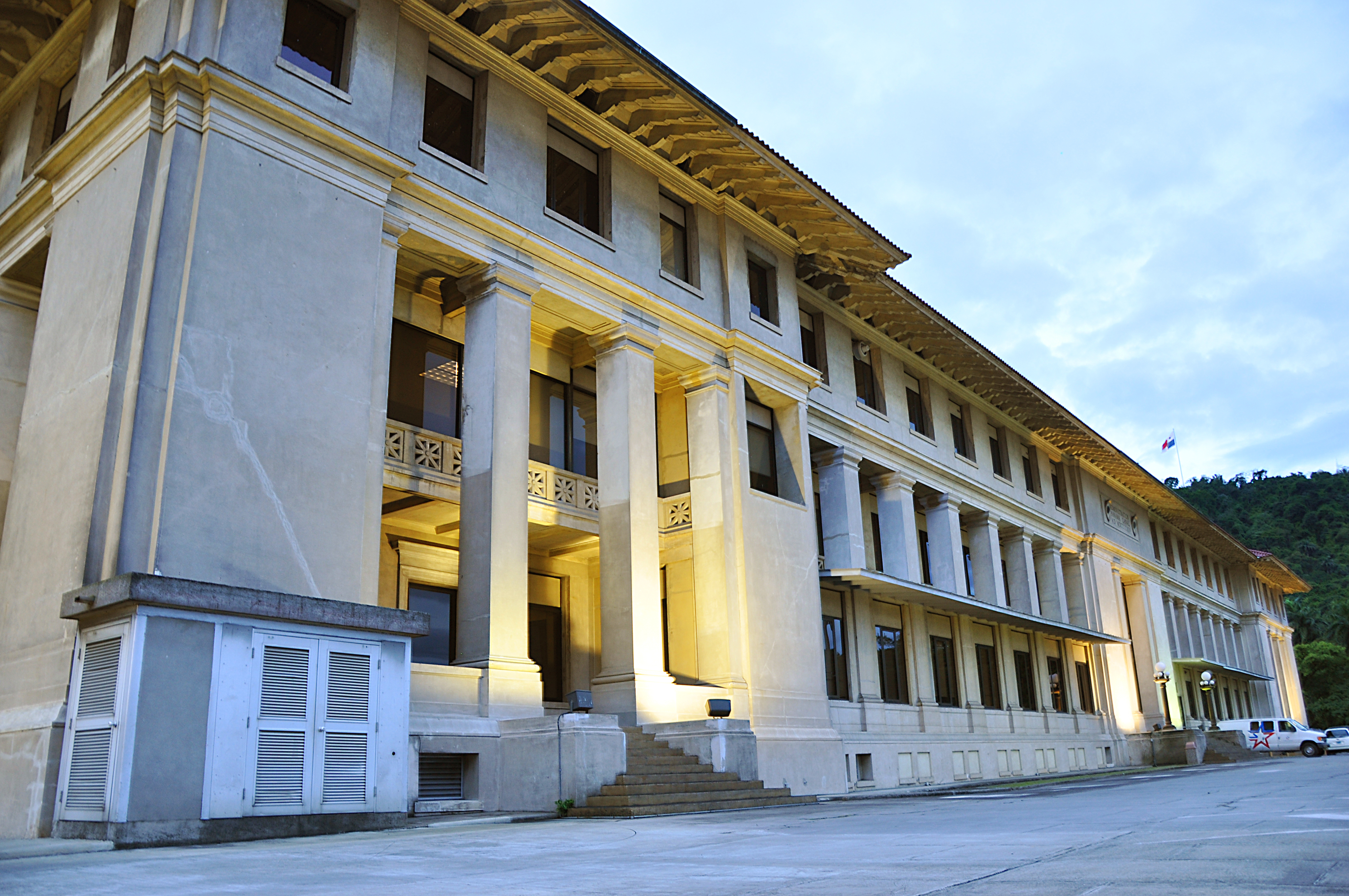
Panama Canal Administration Building

Carlos Arellano Lennox was born in Panama City in 1928. As a student, in 1958 he devised the Operación Soberanía plan for peacefully protesting the U.S. domination of the Panama Canal Zone by planting Panamanian flags at different points across it. On 2 May 1958, a group of students, attired in suits and ties, took six taxis to the designated points and at 10:15 a.m., taking advantage of the fact that it was a rest hour for many Zonians, planted 75 flags across the zone. Arellano and Ricardo Ríos Torres took charge of planting the largest flag in front of the Canal Administration Building in Balboa. The Zone police were confused and unable to do anything about the surprise action, allowing the students to return to Panama City, where they held a nationalist march without any major incidents.

On 5 May, he organised a march to the office of the president, where he was received by President Ernesto de la Guardia, who assured him that a way would be found for the Panamanian flag to be raised in the Zone. De la Guardia and Arellano made an appearance on the first-floor balcony and addressed the crowd. "The youth of Panama will not rest until Panamanian sovereignty over the Canal Zone is recognised," Arellano declared. Under the president's approving gaze, he continued: "Tomorrow the government will begin to take steps so the Panamanian flag can fly permanently in the territory of the Canal Zone."

Operation Sovereignty presaged two later nationalist events against the U.S. presence in Panama: the riots of 3 November 1959 and the riots of 9–10 January 1964 ("Martyrs' Day"), the latter of which resulted in between 20 and 30 Panamanian deaths, four or five U.S. soldiers killed, and the severing of diplomatic relations. Arellano's actions also fuelled a broad nationalist debate in Panama and marked the starting point for politicians to begin speaking out in international forums about Panama's unequal treatment by the U.S. authorities. One notable example was Foreign Minister Miguel J. Moreno, who was later the ambassador to the United States and permanent representative to the Organization of American States and who, in the latter capacity, signed a 1964 joint declaration with Ellsworth Bunker of the United States towards settling the two countries' differences and re-establishing diplomatic ties.

== Political career ==
Arellano was a founder of the Christian Democratic Party (PDC). He participated in its constitutive convention of 20 November 1960 and was elected its first general secretary.

Arellano ran for and was elected to the National Assembly in the 1984 general election. He was re-elected to the Assembly in the 1989 general election, but due to the annulment of the elections and the subsequent U.S. invasion of December 1989, he did not take office until March 1990. Following the restoration of democracy in Panama, he was elected as president of the National Assembly for the period March–August 1990. He was also vice-president of the PDC until the political crisis of April 1991, during which the PDC was expelled from the government of President Guillermo Endara.

== Academic work ==
Arellano graduated from the University of Panama with a bachelor's degree in biology and chemistry. He then obtained a master's degree in general oceanography and a PhD in marine sciences from the University of Marseille in France.

He held teaching positions at the University of Panama, the Universidad Católica Santa María La Antigua, the Escuela Náutica Nacional, and Columbus University. He was the National Director of Marine Resources, director of the Centre for Marine Sciences at the University of Panama, dean of the Faculty of Nautical Sciences and vice-rector of research and postgraduate studies at Columbus University. He was also a consultant to the Food and Agriculture Organization of the United Nations.

In February 2004 he was appointed administrator of the National Environmental Authority (Autoridad Nacional del Ambiente) during the government of Mireya Moscoso. However, he was forced to leave the post after 24 days due to the enforcement of the Faúndes Law, which required public officials to retire upon reaching 75 years of age: a detail that at the time of his appointment had been ignored.

== Published works ==
Arellano's published works included:

- Sistemática de las poblaciones pelágicas y bentónicas en la bahía de Panamá
- Zooplancton en el canal de Panamá
- Zooplancton en el Caribe panameño
- Transporte de sustancias radioactivas por el canal de Panamá
- Contaminación residual en la ex Zona del Canal
