= UMIP =

UMIP or umip may refer to:

- Universidad Marítima Internacional de Panamá, the International Maritime University of Panama
- User-mode Instruction Prevention (umip), a CPUID feature bit for the x86 architecture
- UMIP, a Proxy Mobile IPv6 implementation

== See also ==
- UMIPS or MIPS OS, a discontinued UNIX operating system developed by MIPS Computer Systems
