= Parañaque =

Highly urbanized city in Metro Manila, Philippines

- Highly urbanized city
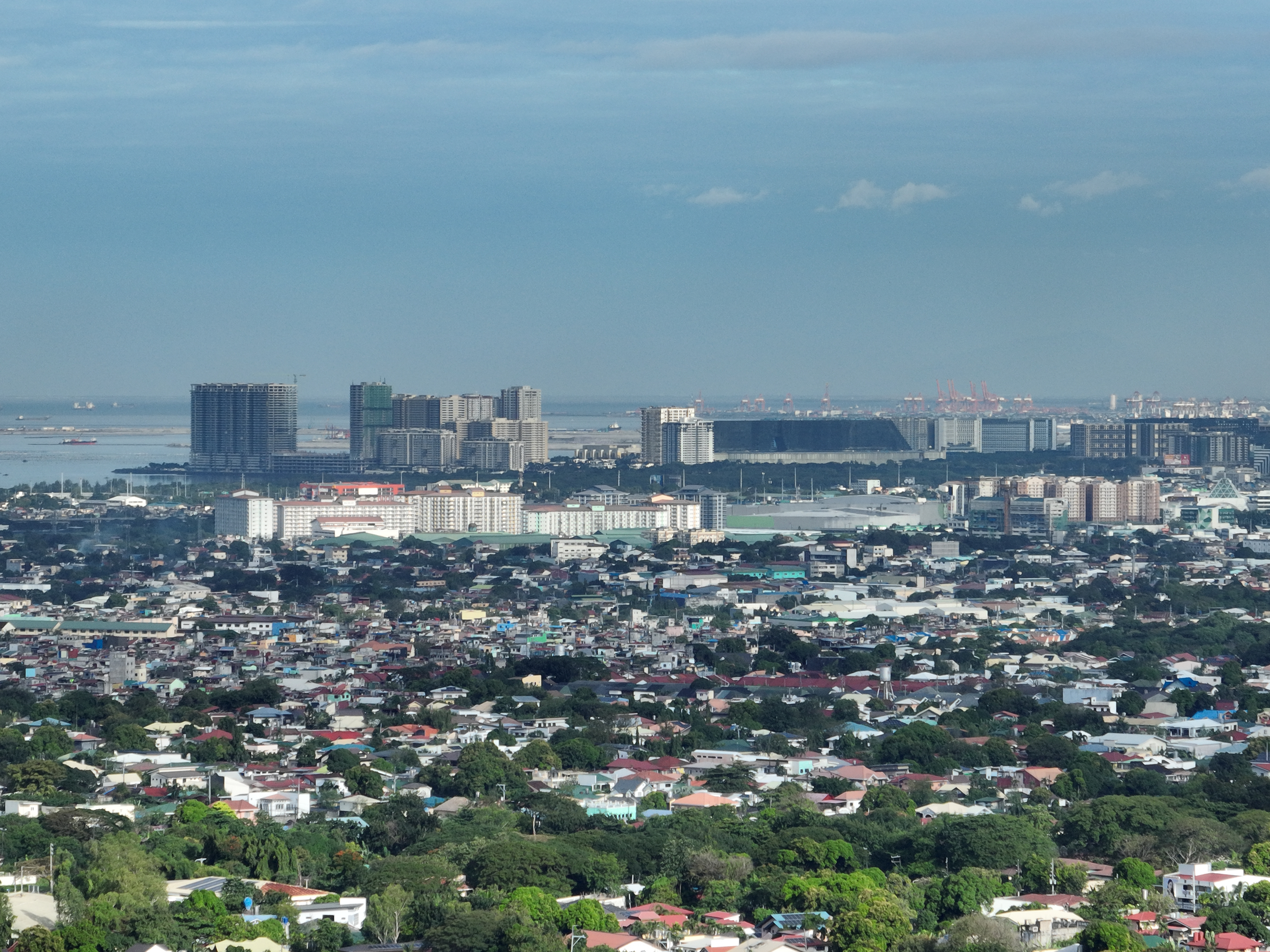
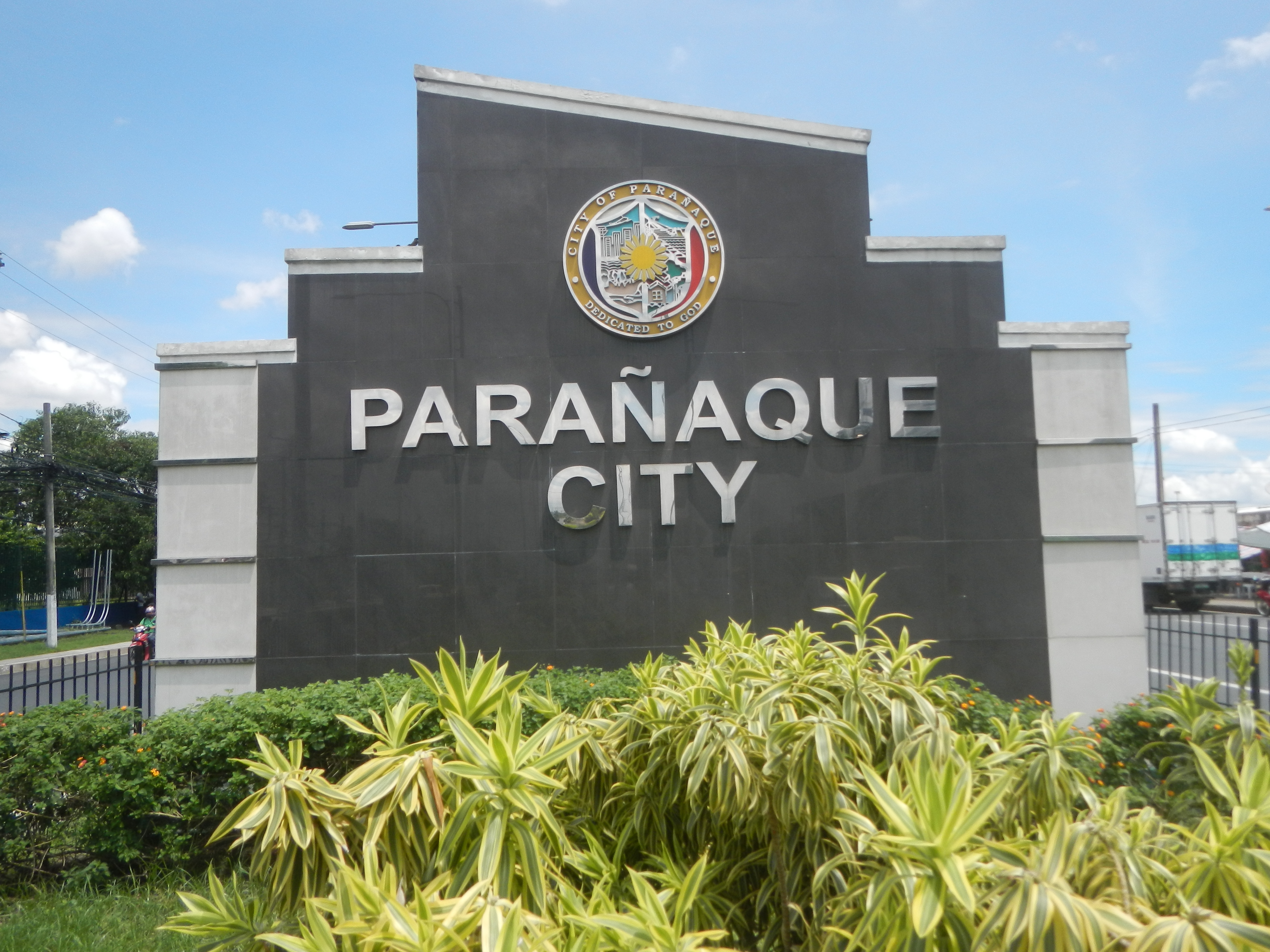
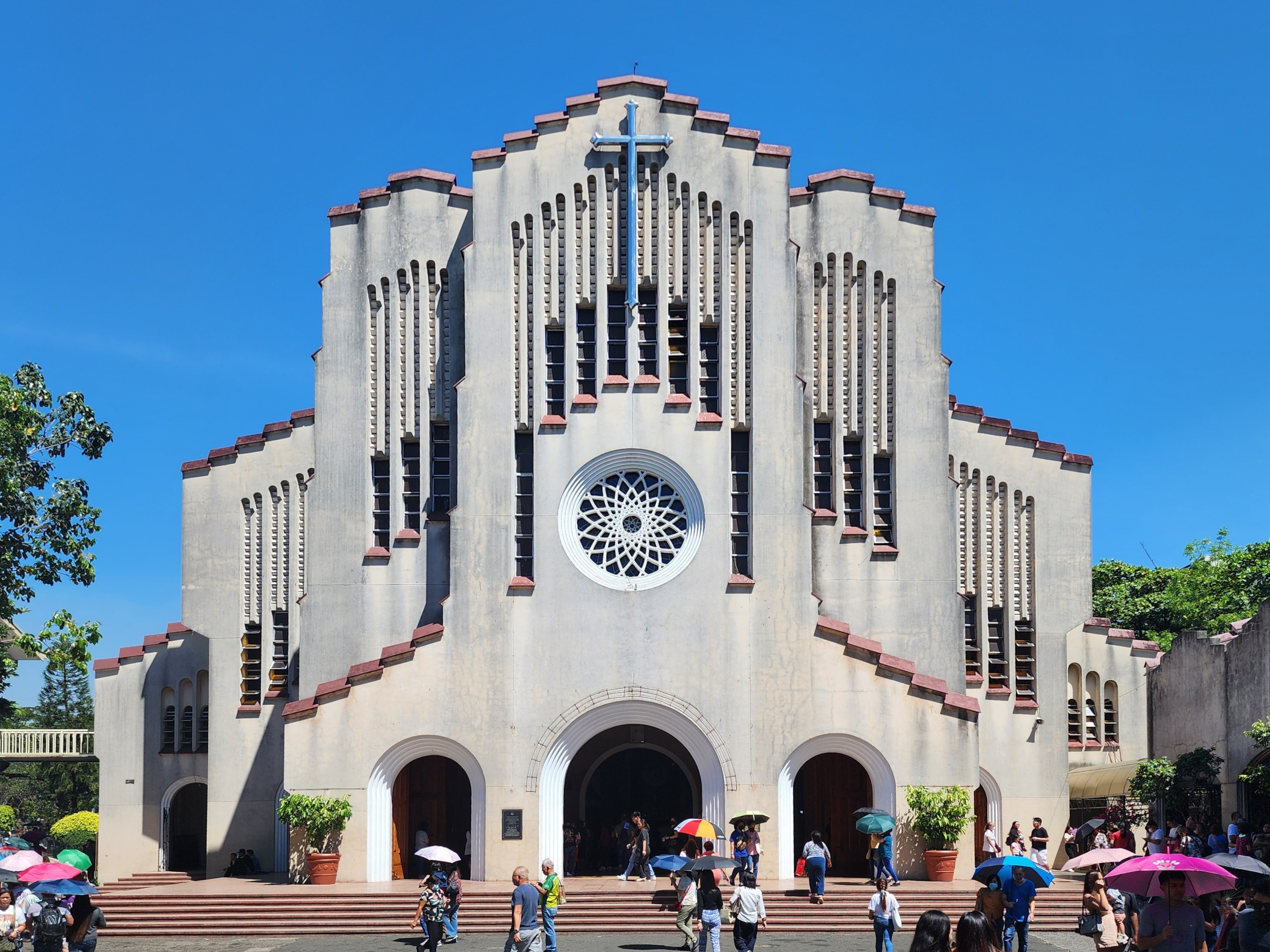
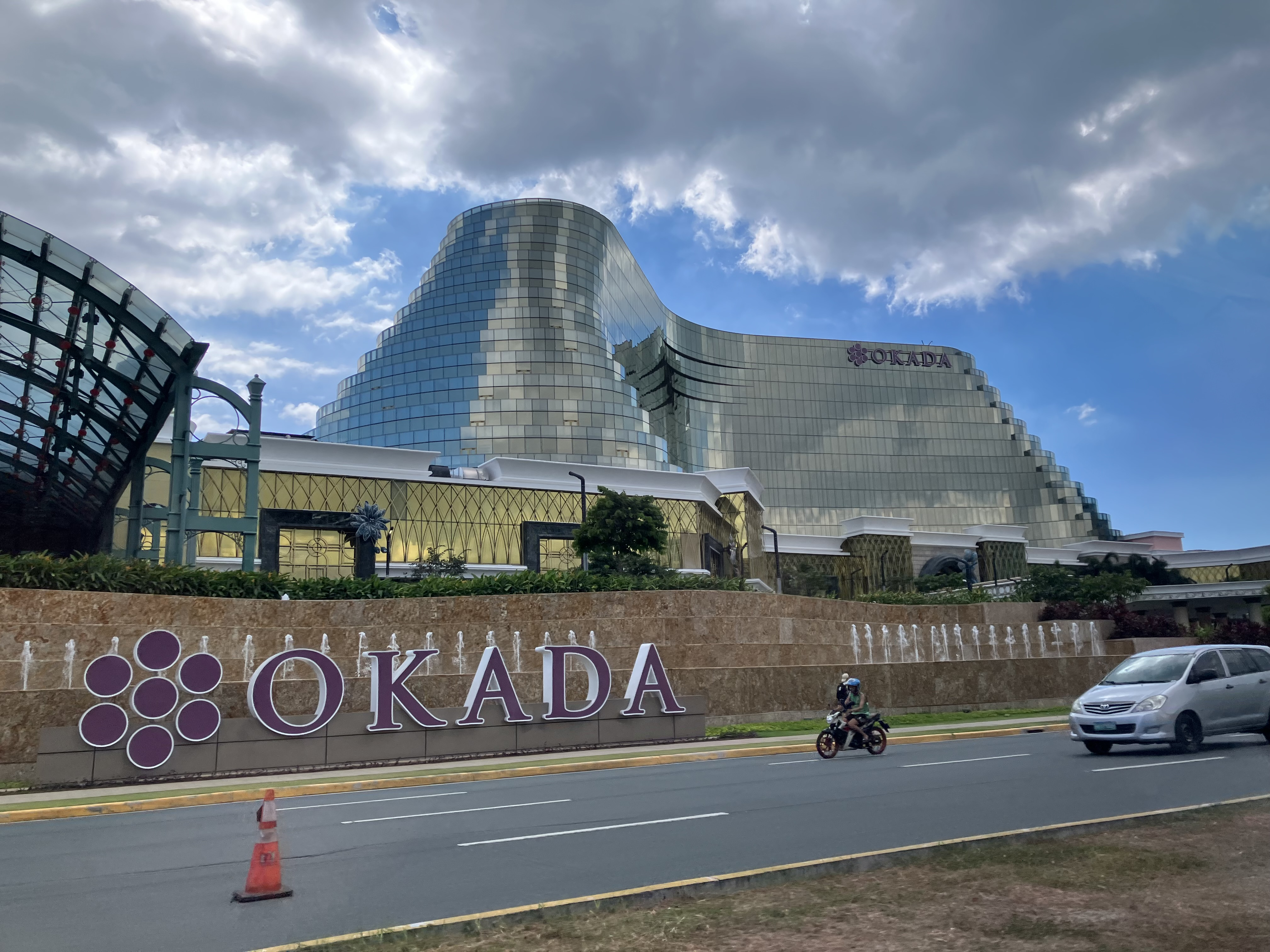
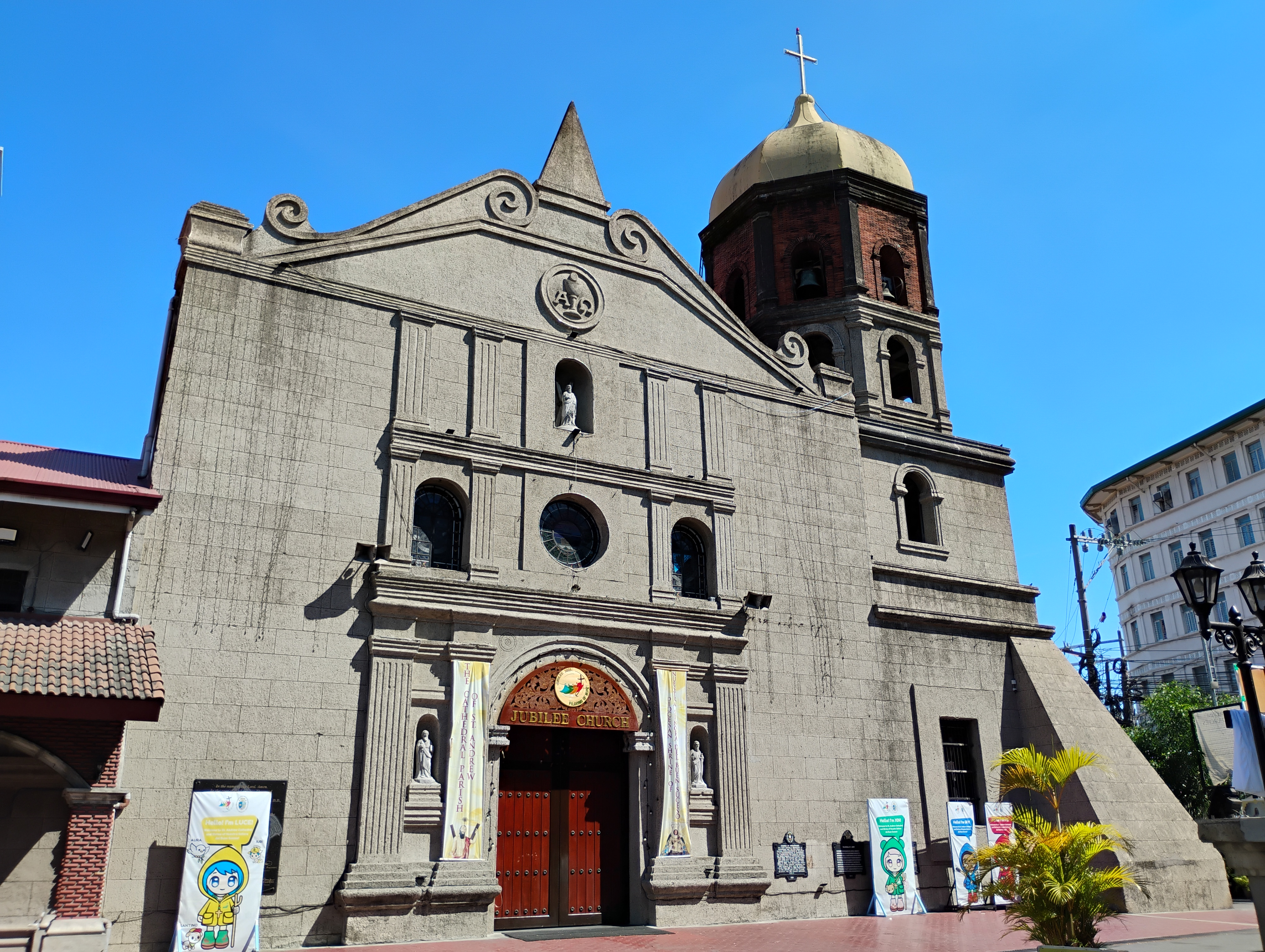
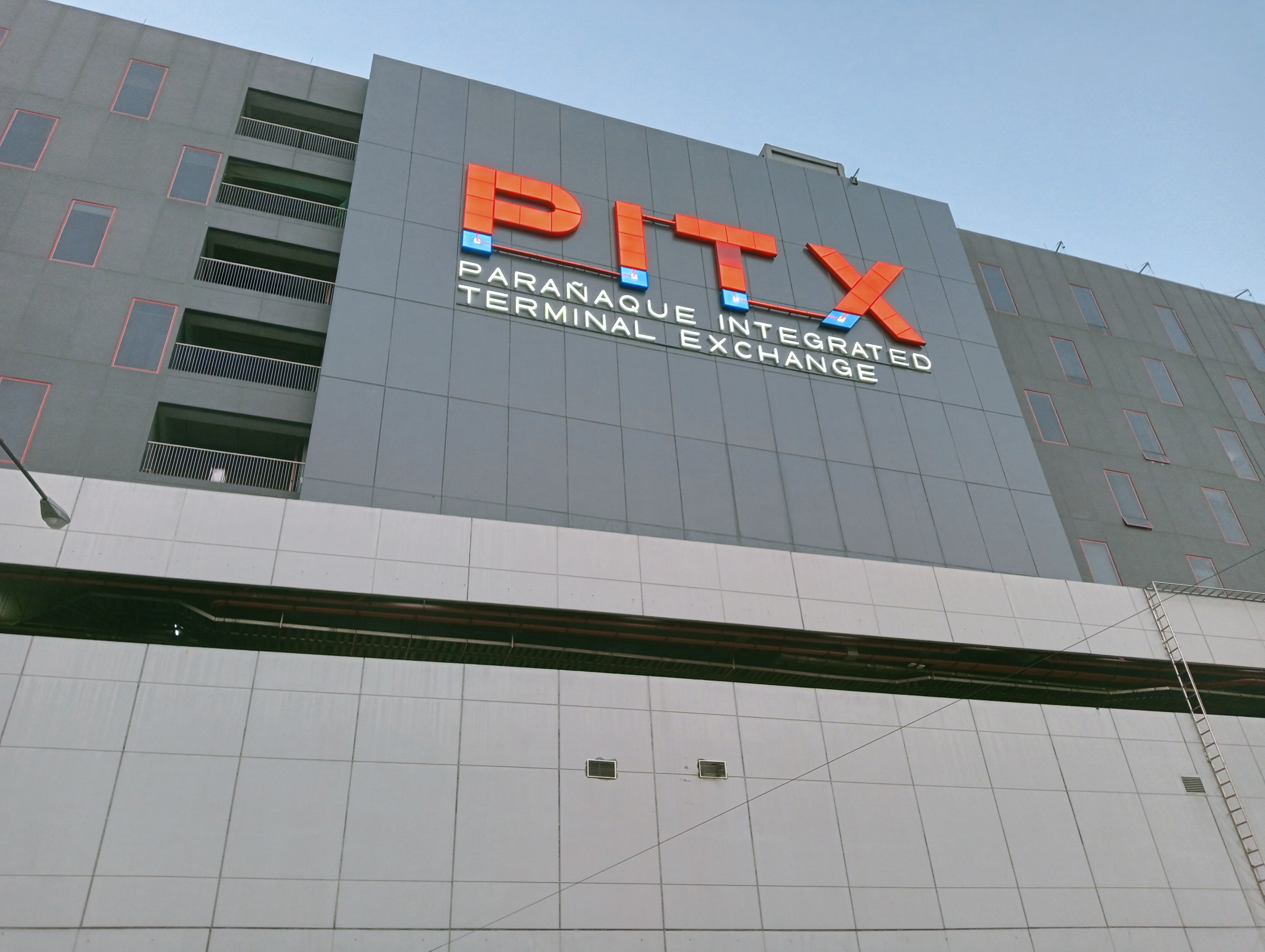
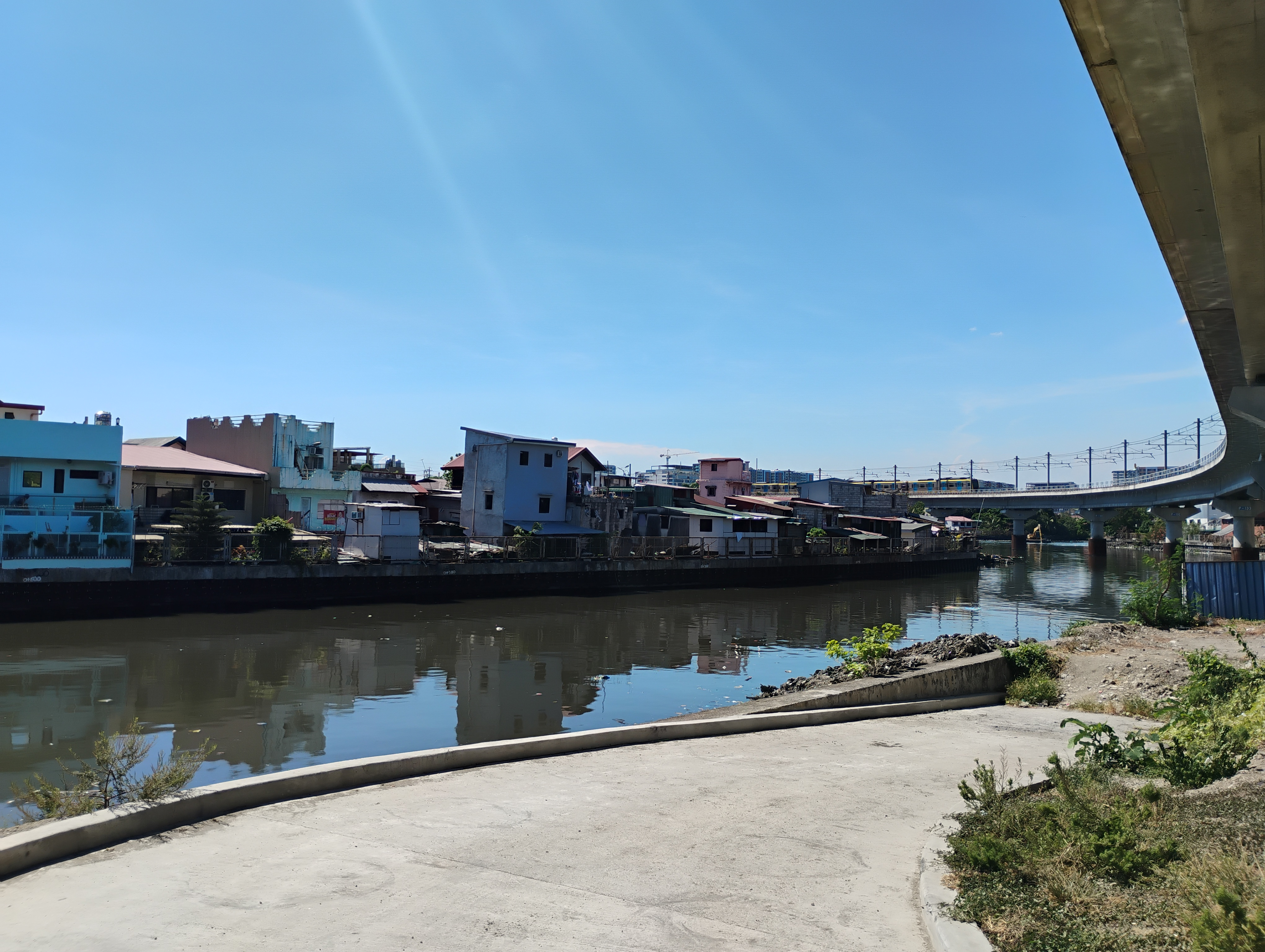
- Aerial view of Parañaque Welcome Sign Baclaran Church Parañaque City Hall Okada Manila Parañaque Cathedral PITX Manila Memorial Park – Sucat Parañaque River

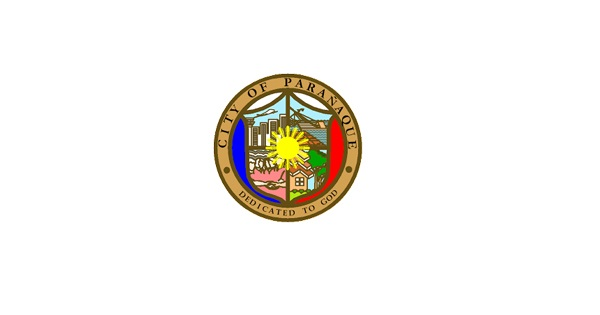
- Flag Seal
- Nickname(s): A Mega City by the Bay, The Fashion Capital of the Philippines, City of Lights
- Motto: Dedicated to God
- Anthem: Bagong Parañaque (English: New Parañaque)
- Map of Metro Manila with Parañaque highlighted
- Interactive map of Parañaque
- Location within the Philippines
- Coordinates: 14°30′03″N 120°59′29″E
- Country: Philippines
- Region: Metro Manila
- Province: none
- District: 1st and 2nd district
- Founded: May 11, 1580
- Cityhood and HUC: March 22, 1998
- Barangays: 16 (see Barangays)

Government
  - Type: Sangguniang Panlungsod
  - Mayor: Edwin L. Olivarez (Lakas–CMD)
  - Vice Mayor: Florencio C. Bernabe III (PFP)
  - Representatives: Eric L. Olivarez (Lakas–CMD) (1st District); Brian Raymund S. Yamsuan (NUP) (2nd District)
  - City Council: Members: 1st District; Raquel G. Velasco; Pablo A. Olivarez II; Daniel Eric M. Baes; Allen Ford L. Tan; Charles Yeoj L. Marquez; Brillante V. Inciong; Carina S. Gabriel; Shannin Mae O. Bernardo; 2nd District; Jose Enrico T. Golez; Maritess B. De Asis; Vincent Kenneth M. Favis; Jerome Bart M. Frias; Viktor Eriko M. Sotto; Ma. Kristine G. Eplana; Shiela G. Benzon; John Ryan G. Yllana
  - Electorate: 353,274 voters (2025)

Area
  - Total: 46.57 km^{2} (17.98 sq mi)
- Elevation: 11 m (36 ft)
- Highest elevation: 108 m (354 ft)
- Lowest elevation: 0 m (0 ft)

Population (2024 census)
  - Total: 703,245
  - Density: 15,100/km^{2} (39,110/sq mi)
  - Households: 182,216
- Demonym(s): Parañaqueño (male); Parañaqueña (female)

Economy
  - Income class: 1st city income class
  - Poverty incidence: 0.9% (2023)
  - Revenue: ₱ 10,659 million (2024)
  - Assets: ₱ 37,609 million (2024)
  - Expenditure: ₱ 8,845 million (2024)
  - Liabilities: ₱ 10,257 million (2024)

Service provider
  - Electricity: Manila Electric Company (Meralco)
- Time zone: UTC+8 (PST)
- PSGC: 1381000000
- IDD : area code: +63 (0)02
- Native languages: Filipino
- Patroness: Saint Andrew the Apostle, Our Lady of the Good Event (Parañaque)
- Catholic Diocese Jurisdiction: Roman Catholic Diocese of Parañaque
- Website: paranaquecity.gov.ph

Parañaque, officially the City of Parañaque (Filipino: Lungsod ng Parañaque, Tagalog pronunciation: [paɾaˈɲäke̞]), is a highly urbanized city in the National Capital Region of the Philippines. According to the 2024 census, it has a population of 703,245 people.

It is bordered to the north by Pasay, to the northeast by Taguig, to the southeast by Muntinlupa, to the southwest by Las Piñas, and to the west by Manila Bay. Like the rest of Metro Manila, Parañaque experiences a tropical climate with only two distinct seasons, wet (July to September) and dry (October to June). The city enjoys an annual rainfall of 1,822 millimeters (71.7 in) and an average daily maximum temperature of 34.4 °C (93.9 °F).

Parañaque is the home of Entertainment City, a gaming and entertainment complex under development by the state-owned Philippine Amusement and Gaming Corporation, spanning an area of 8 km^{2} (3.1 sq mi) in Bay City, where four large integrated resorts are based namely Solaire Resort & Casino, City of Dreams Manila, Okada Manila, and the soon to be completed Westside City Resorts World. It is also the home of the Parañaque Integrated Terminal Exchange public transport terminal and the Aseana City business district development which includes Ayala Malls Manila Bay.

== Etymology ==
Several myths are speculated as to how Parañaque derived its name.

- One narrative holds that long ago, a balete (banyan) tree that looked like a majestic ship stood at the mouth of what is now called the Parañaque River. It earned the Tagalog name Palanyag, taken from the term "palayag", which means “point of navigation”.
- Another folktale says that before the Spaniards having arrived at the shore, there were natives who lived close to Manila Bay, and their occupation was fishing (pangingisdâ). Their neighbours to the east in present-day Muntinlupa were farmers and called "tagá-palayán" ("of the rice paddies"). One day, the fishermen and rice farmers held a feast, and were drunk from tubâ (coconut toddy). One farmer suggested they name the whole place "Palayán" as a sign of cooperation and goodwill between them. A fisherman protested, saying they should name it "Palalayag" instead. As a compromise, they agreed to merge the two words and came up with "Palalanyag". Another drunken guest shouted, “Mabuhay ang Palanyag at ang mga tagá-Palanyag!” ("Long live Palanyag and those of Palanyag!") The rest liked this word better, and the place was called "Palanyag".
- A third myth suggests that Spanish soldiers in a horse-drawn carriage asked to be taken to a certain place. When they arrived, one of the soldiers ordered, "¡Para aquí!" (“You stop here!”), which the coachman did not understand. The soldier repeated it and later, the coachman left the carriage and told others “These Spaniards are repeatedly saying "para aniya ake” to the laughter of the crowd. The story spread, and the term "Para Aniya Ake" stuck.
- Another speculation, however contested, is that Parañaque is a portmanteau of the words "Parang" (Tagalog for grassland) and "aqui" (Spanish for here), for its inland areas occupied by present-day San Antonio Valley, Bicutan and Barangay BF Homes (28-39m. above sea level).

=== Historical account ===
"On the coast near Manila are Laguo (i.e. Lagyo), Malahat, Longalo, Palañac, Vakol, Minacaya, and Cavite. All these villages are in the neighborhood of Cavite, and belong to His Majesty, to whom they pay tribute." – Miguel de Loarca, Relación de Yslas Filipinas (1582)

Historically speaking, the earliest Spanish records (de Loarca's Relación etc.) listed the settlement as "Palañac", which indicates that by at least the late 16th century, the place's name was something akin to "Palanyag".

== History ==
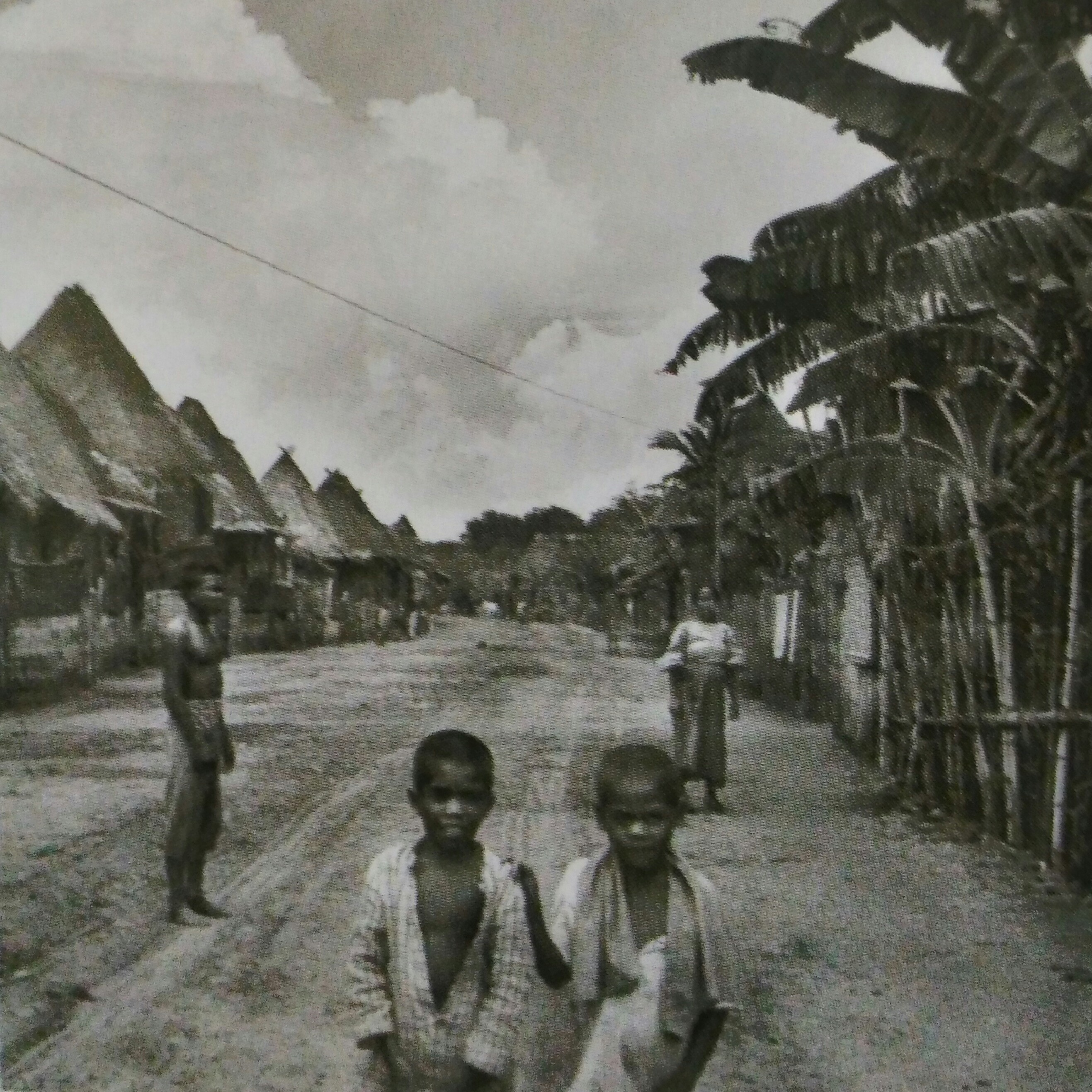
The town of Parañaque around 1898, at the beginning of the American Occupation

=== Early history ===
Due to their proximity to the sea, the early Parañaqueños traded with the Chinese, Japanese, Indonesians, Indians, and Malays. Traditional occupations and trades included saltmaking, fishing, planting rice, shoemaking, slipper-making and weaving.

=== Spanish and American colonial eras ===
Parañaque was officially founded in the year 1580 by Order of Saint Augustine and it was Fray Diego de Espiñar, O.S.A. who became the first minister of the town. The Council of the Definitors (a conference of chiefs of the religious orders) held on May 11, 1580 (Conquistas delas Islas of Fray Gaspar San Agustin, O.S.A.) accepted the village of Palanyag, as Parañaque, as an independent pueblo. Other towns in the islands which simultaneously established on the same date according to the 1580 chapter of the Augustinians were Malolos (in Bulacan), Bulacabe (on Panay) and Bantayan (in Cebu). The image of Palanyag's patroness, Nuestra Señora del Buen Suceso de Palanyag, was brought to Saint Andrew's Parish in La Huerta on August 10, 1625. Nuestra Señora del Buen Suceso de Palanyag is the third oldest Marian Image in the Philippines.

Early Spanish census dated 1591 to 1593 also mentioned Longalo and Parañaque as two villages along Manila Bay composed of some 800 tribute-payers. Politically, Don Galo and Parañaque were then under the Encomienda and Provincia de Tondo. The community was headed by cabezas de barangay, a westernized version of datus (chieftains), and the principalía (Hispanicised local nobility), who together justified and moderated the demands of the Spanish colonizers. Education was limited to the principalía as they were the only ones who could afford it.

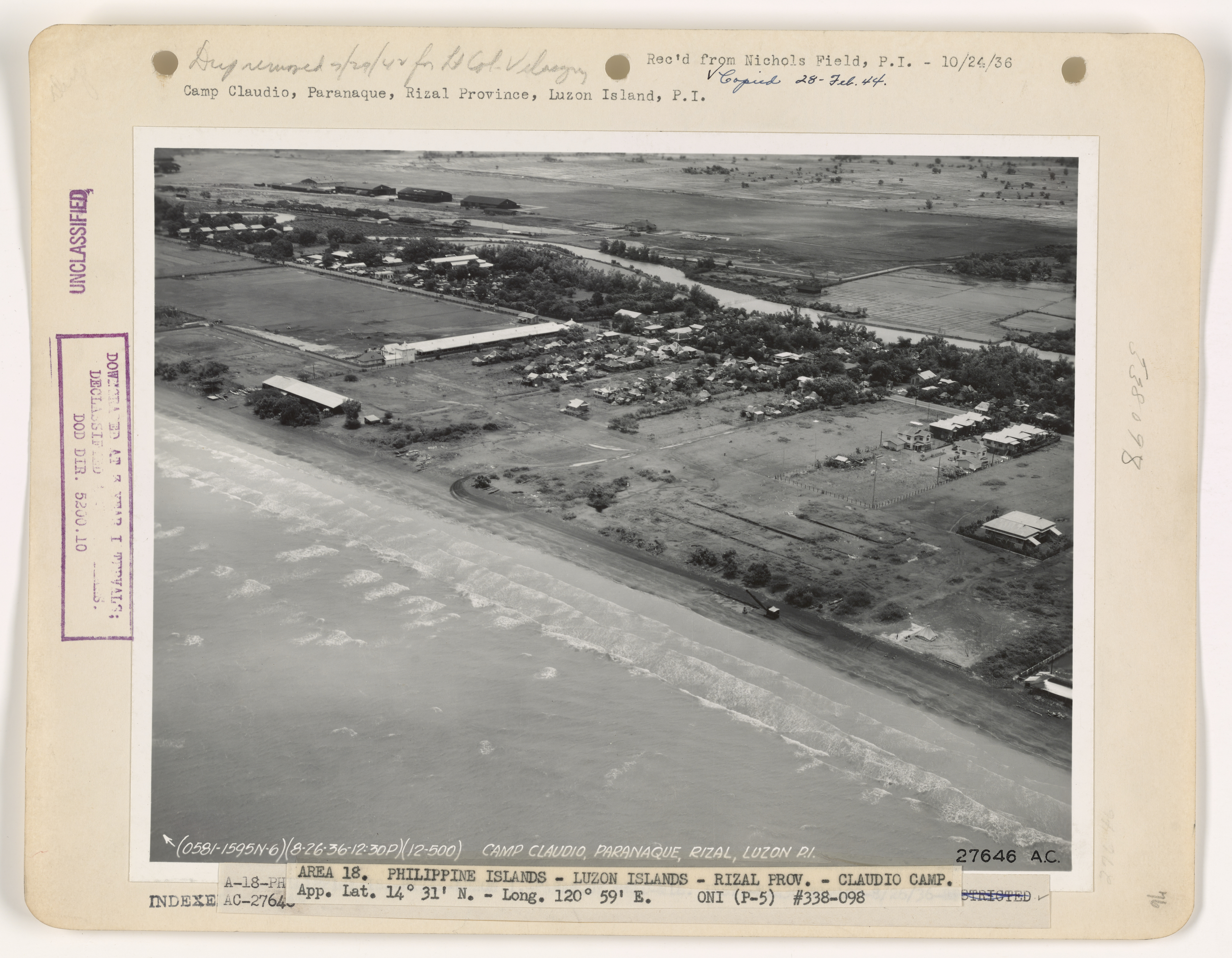
Aerial view of Camp Claudio in Parañaque, 1917

Historical accounts state that the town's strategic location enabled the townspeople to play an important role in Philippine history. Palanyag was located at the crossroads of Manila, between the provinces of Cavite and Batangas. In 1574, during the invasion of the town by the Chinese pirate Limahong, Parañaquenos, particularly those from Don Galo, heroically aided in preventing the attack on Manila. This incident became known as the "Red Sea Incident" due to the blood that flowed through the sacrifice of the people of barrio Santa Monica. With the arrival of Spanish forces led by Captain Juan de Salcedo from Ilocos, Limahong was finally repulsed, and the occupation of the town was averted.

When the British invaded Manila in 1762, the townspeople once again remained loyal to the Spanish colonizers, especially the Augustinians. The invasion however showed that the Spaniards was not invincible and that their rule was not to be permanent. More than a hundred years later, this would prove to be true. During the Philippine Revolution of 1896–1898, the Spaniards realized that the town was a practical gateway to Cavite, the bastion of the revolutionary Katipuneros. Conversely, the Katipuneros based in Cavite saw the town as their gateway to Intramuros, the Spanish seat of government in Manila. Prominent Paraqueños such as Manuel Quiogue and secular priest Father Pedro Dandan y Masangkay became leading revolutionary figures.

During the American Period of the Philippines, Parañaque became part of the newly established province of Rizal in 1901. The municipality was previously part of the province of Manila, which was in turn disestablished.

On October 12, 1903, Las Piñas was merged to become part of Parañaque. However, it was later separated on March 27, 1907 to become an independent town once again.

=== Japanese occupation era ===
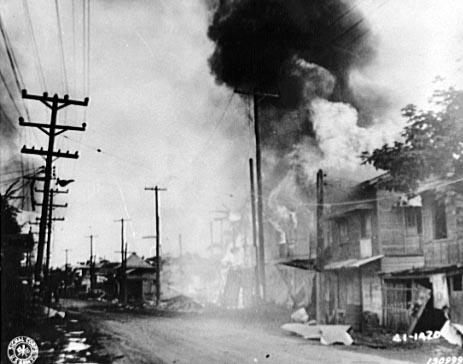
A burning building along Taft Avenue which was hit during the Japanese air raid in Parañaque, December 13, 1941.

On January 1, 1942, Parañaque was one of the towns of Rizal that was merged with Manila and Quezon City to form the City of Greater Manila. During the Japanese occupation of the Philippines in World War II, Parañaque supplied leadership to guerilla movements such as the Hunters ROTC, as well as food and arms. Parañaque was one of the first towns to be liberated and its guerillas helped pave the way for the combined American and Philippine Commonwealth forces to enter the south of Manila. As can be gleaned from the above, Parañaque has played and continues to play a strategic role in the Philippines' political and economic progress, as shown by the quick recovery the town shown following the damage it incurred during the long Battle of Manila in 1945. The City of Greater Manila was disestablished effective August 1, 1945.

=== Philippine independence ===
In late 1959, 17-year-old Arturo Porcuna murdered Serafin Ong, a Lyceum of the Philippines student who belonged to a prominent family in Manila, at the Barbecue Plaza along Dewey Boulevard (now Roxas Boulevard); it was among Porcuna's first criminal acts that lead to his notoriety as a gangster of the alias "Boy Golden".

In 1965, barrios Baclaran and Tambo were excised from Parañaque to form part of the newly-established municipality of Baclaran. However, the Supreme Court of the Philippines later voided the creation of the new municipality, thus returning the aforementioned barrios to Parañaque.

On November 7, 1975, Parañaque was separated from Rizal and became part of Metropolitan Manila or the National Capital Region by virtue of Presidential Decree No. 824.

=== Cityhood ===
Parañaque was later converted as the eleventh city of Metro Manila on February 15, 1998, and was chartered and urbanized through President Fidel V. Ramos during the celebration of the city's 418th Founding Anniversary. Incumbent Joey Marquez became its first city mayor.

=== Contemporary ===
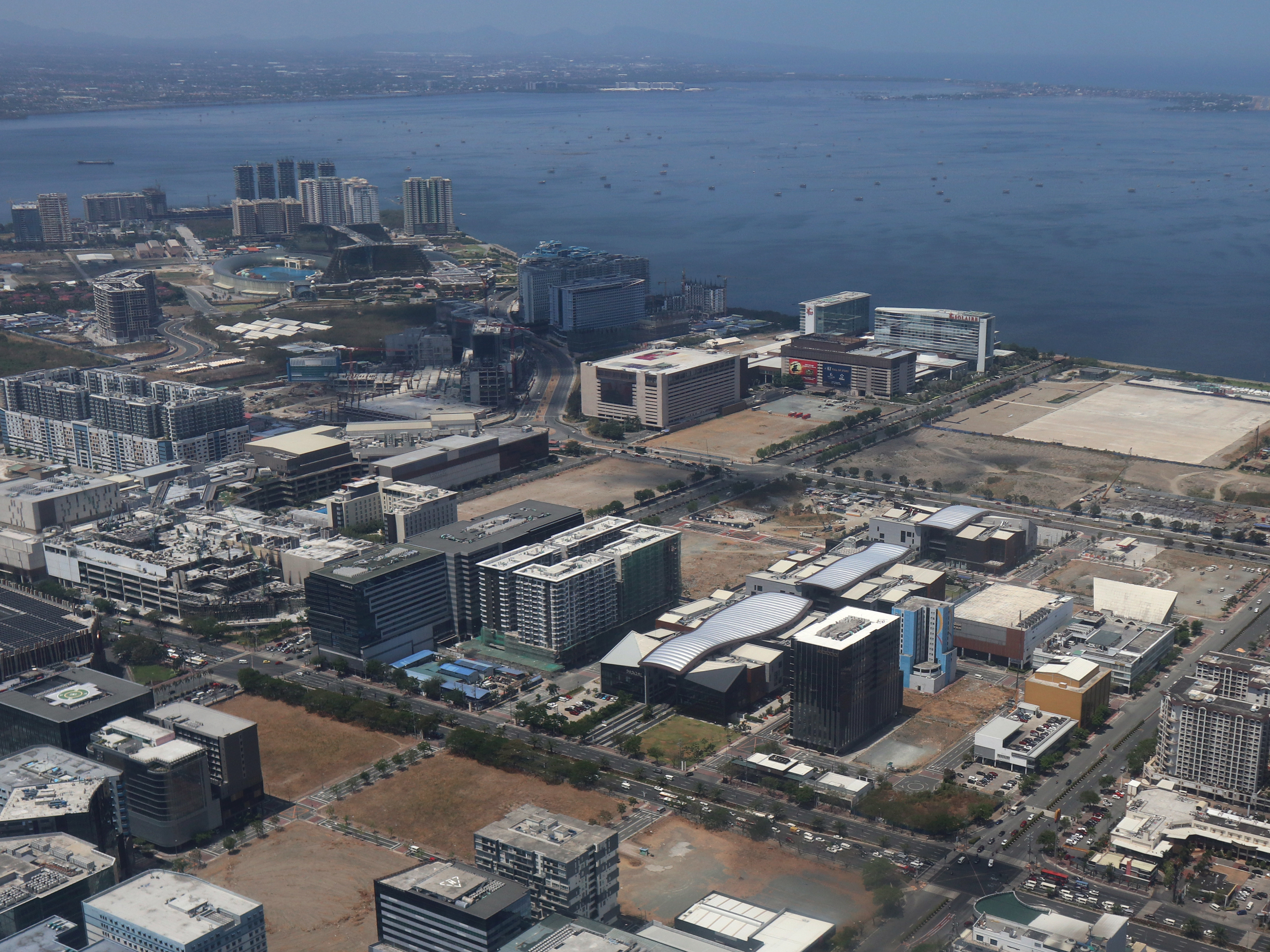
View of Bay City reclamation area's portion in Parañaque

Owing to Parañaque's strategic location, it is an important center for trade and business in Metro Manila. Baclaran, where a large number of dry goods stores are located, is one of the busiest markets in the country. Small fishing villages called “fisherman's wharves” are also situated alongside Barangay La Huerta, where the famous DAMPA, a seaside market with numerous restaurants serving fresh seafood, is found. This has the country's international airport and the Duty Free Philippines for imported goods and Entertainment City where three integrated resorts (IR) licensed by Philippine Amusement and Gaming Corporation (PAGCOR) are located. On October 9, 2018, the Parañaque Integrated Terminal Exchange, the first landport in the Philippines, was officially opened.

In July 2026, the five coastal barangays—Baclaran, Tambo, Don Galo, La Huerta, and San Dionisio—officially expanded their boundaries westward into the Bay City reclamation area and the northern portion of the Las Piñas–Parañaque Critical Habitat and Ecotourism Area through a straight-line boundary approach. This occurred after voters of the said barangays ratified City Ordinance No. 2023-19 in a plebiscite on July 25 that garnered 11,597 "yes" votes against 2,254 "no" votes with a 17.5% voter turnout.

== Geography ==
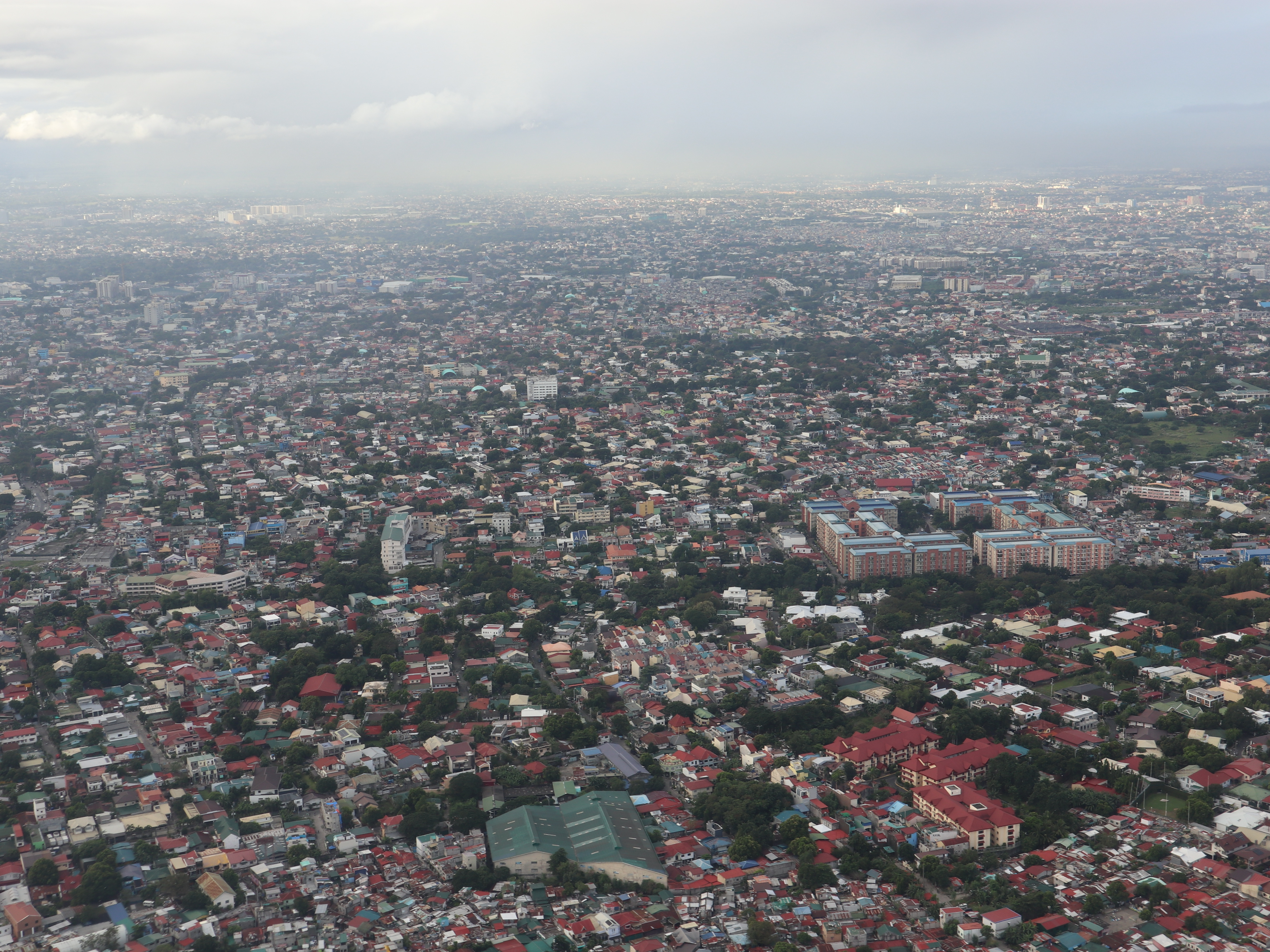
Parañaque from air.

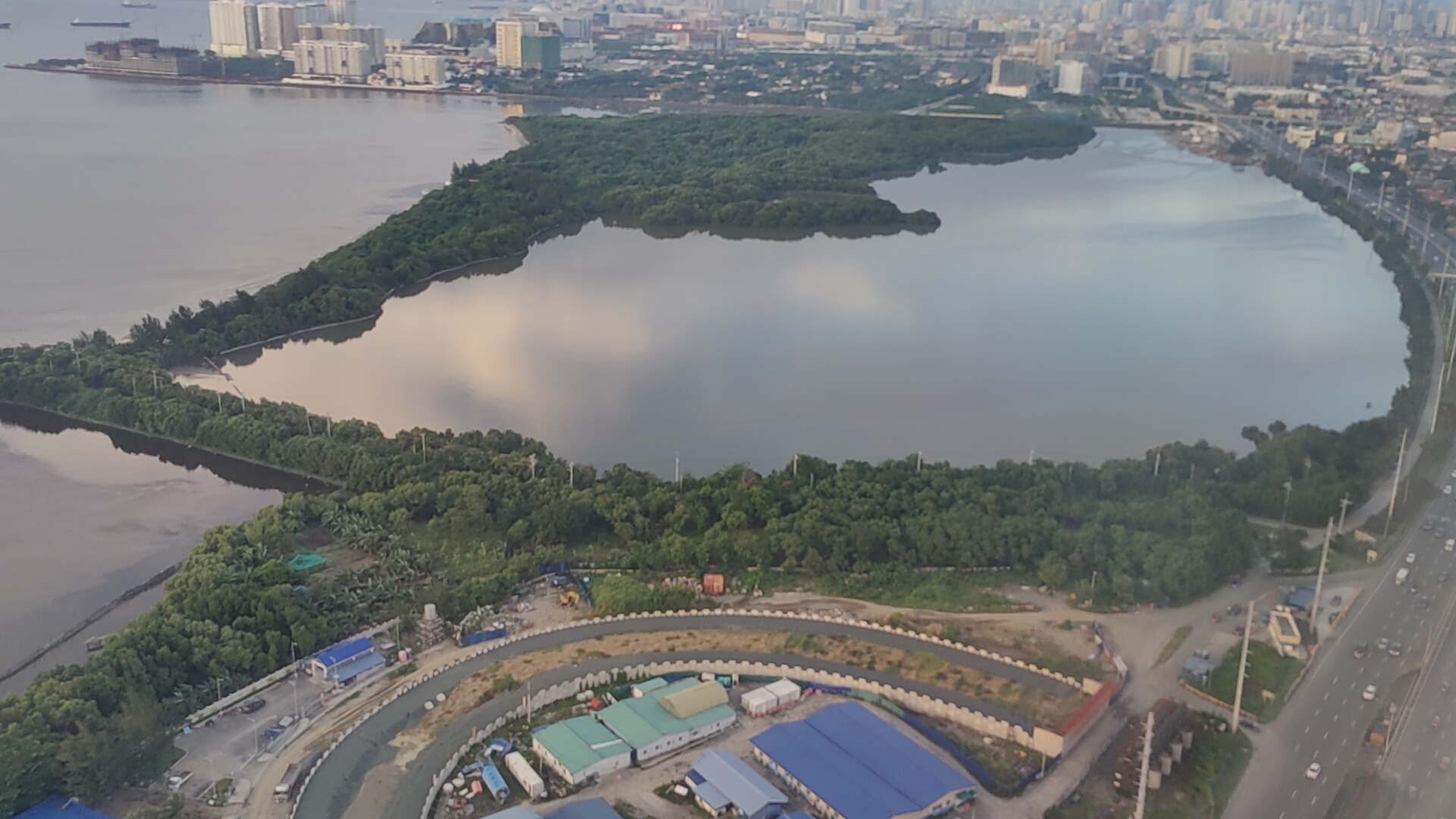
Las Piñas–Parañaque Critical Habitat and Ecotourism Area, located at the western coast of Parañaque along Manila Bay

Parañaque is situated in the southern portion of Metro Manila. It is subdivided into two distinct districts, each of which contains eight barangays. The 1st District consists of Baclaran, Tambo, Don Galo, Santo Niño, La Huerta, San Dionisio, San Isidro and Vitalez, while the 2nd District consists of Barangays BF Homes, San Antonio, Marcelo Green, Sun Valley, Don Bosco, Moonwalk, Merville and San Martin de Porres.

=== Districts and barangays ===
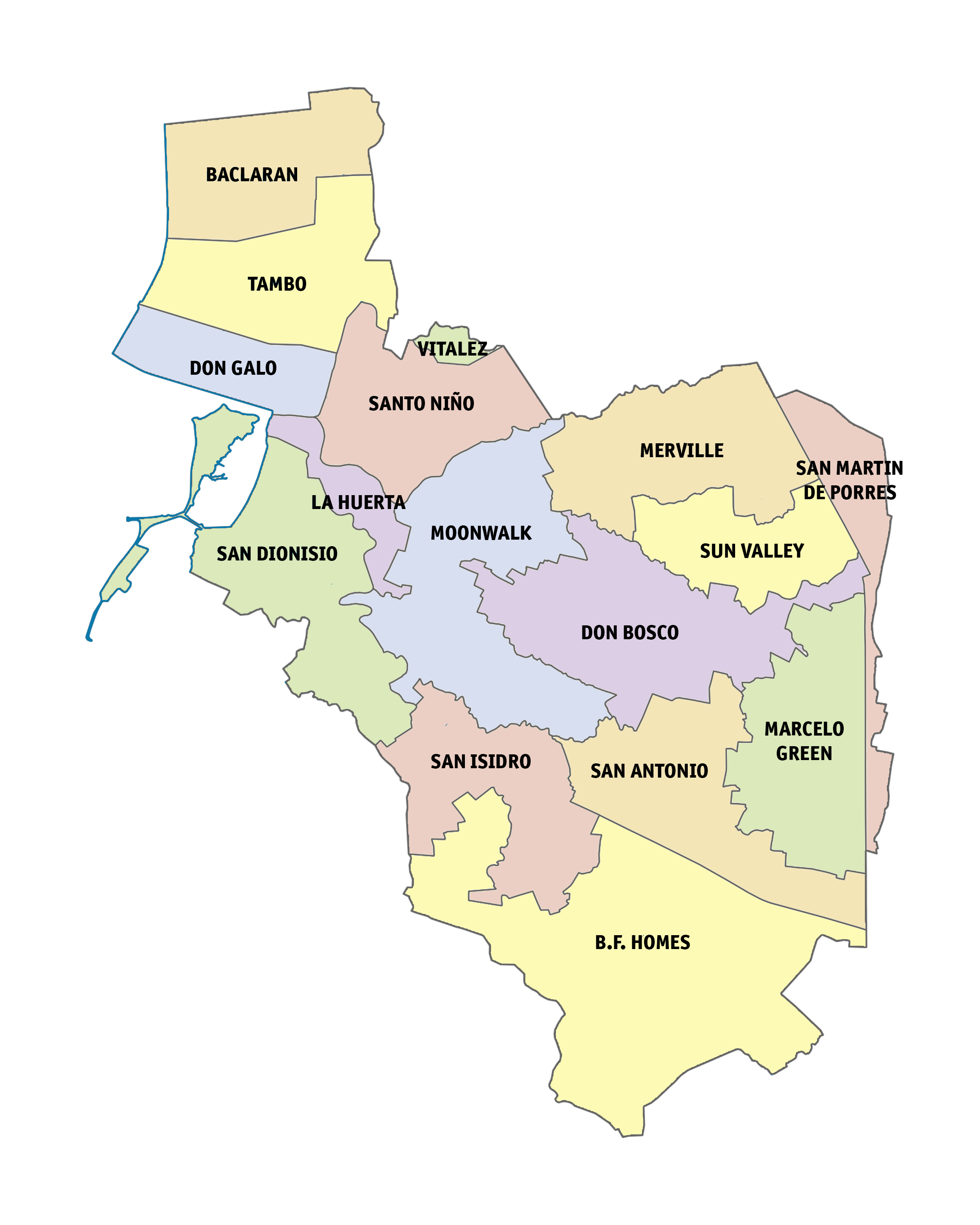
Political map of Parañaque before the July 25, 2026 plebiscite

Parañaque is politically subdivided into 16 barangays.

Barangay	District	Population (2020)	Area (km^{2})	Density (/km^{2})	Zip Code
Baclaran	1st	33,850	0.6372	33477.72	1702
BF Homes	2nd	92,752	7.695	10846.26	1720/1718
Don Bosco	2nd	54,188	3.8475	12377.13	1711
Don Galo	1st	10,550	0.2322	46627.91	1700
La Huerta	1st	8,592	0.5372	16358.90	
Marcelo Green	2nd	37,574	3.0619	9396.78	
Merville	2nd	26,615	3.044	6698.75	1709
Moonwalk	2nd	72,520	3.7728	15801.00	1709
San Antonio	2nd	70,134	2.8719	20838.82	1707/1715
San Dionisio	1st	72,522	6.6256	9199.32	
San Isidro	1st	79,372	3.6522	18902.31	
San Martin de Porres	2nd	20,283	1.5565	13451.98	
Santo Niño	1st	28,925	2.4597	11479.04	1704
Sun Valley	2nd	50,087	1.7775	21145.43	
Tambo	1st	26,928	3.0969	8462.98	1701
Vitalez	1st	5,100	0.572	7898.60	

=== Territorial disputes and discrepancies ===
Parañaque is involved in an unresolved territorial dispute with Muntinlupa. The sitio of Bagong Silang, currently under the jurisdiction of Muntinlupa's Barangay Sucat, is disputed with Barangay BF Homes. It occupies a former property of National Power Corporation spanning an area of 4.1 km^{2} (1.6 sq mi). Additionally, Sitio Pagkakaisa in barangay San Martin de Porres is erroneously considered as part of Sucat.

Moreover, in around 2001, Parañaque resolved a territorial dispute with Taguig, agreeing that the Bicutan Market and the Bicutan Interchange would be part of Parañaque.

=== Climate ===
Climate data for Parañaque
Month	Jan	Feb	Mar	Apr	May	Jun	Jul	Aug	Sep	Oct	Nov	Dec	Year
Mean daily maximum °C (°F)	29 (84)	30 (86)	32 (90)	34 (93)	32 (90)	31 (88)	29 (84)	29 (84)	29 (84)	30 (86)	30 (86)	29 (84)	30 (87)
Mean daily minimum °C (°F)	20 (68)	20 (68)	21 (70)	22 (72)	24 (75)	24 (75)	24 (75)	24 (75)	24 (75)	23 (73)	22 (72)	21 (70)	22 (72)
Average precipitation mm (inches)	10 (0.4)	10 (0.4)	12 (0.5)	27 (1.1)	94 (3.7)	153 (6.0)	206 (8.1)	190 (7.5)	179 (7.0)	120 (4.7)	54 (2.1)	39 (1.5)	1,094 (43)
Average rainy days	5.2	4.5	6.4	9.2	19.7	24.3	26.9	25.7	24.4	21.0	12.9	9.1	189.3
Source: Meteoblue

== Demographics ==
Population census of Parañaque
Year	Pop.	±% p.a.
1903	6,507	—
1918	22,121	+8.50%
1939	21,125	−0.22%
1948	28,884	+3.54%
1960	61,898	+6.56%
1970	97,214	+4.61%
1975	158,974	+10.37%
1980	208,552	+5.58%
1990	308,236	+3.98%
1995	391,296	+4.57%
2000	449,811	+3.03%
2007	552,660	+2.88%
2010	588,126	+2.29%
2015	665,822	+2.39%
2020	689,992	+0.75%
2024	703,245	+0.46%
Source: Philippine Statistics Authority

As of the 2024 census, Parañaque has a population of 703,245, with a density of 15,100 inhabitants per square kilometre or 39,110 inhabitants per square mile.

=== Demonym ===
Residents of Parañaque are called Parañaqueño.

=== Language ===
The native languages of Parañaque are Tagalog and Spanish, Parañaque being the natal place of the great Filipino writer Manuel Bernabe, but the majority of the residents can understand and speak English, and the use and knowledge of Spanish in Parañaque is now almost non-existent.

=== Religion ===
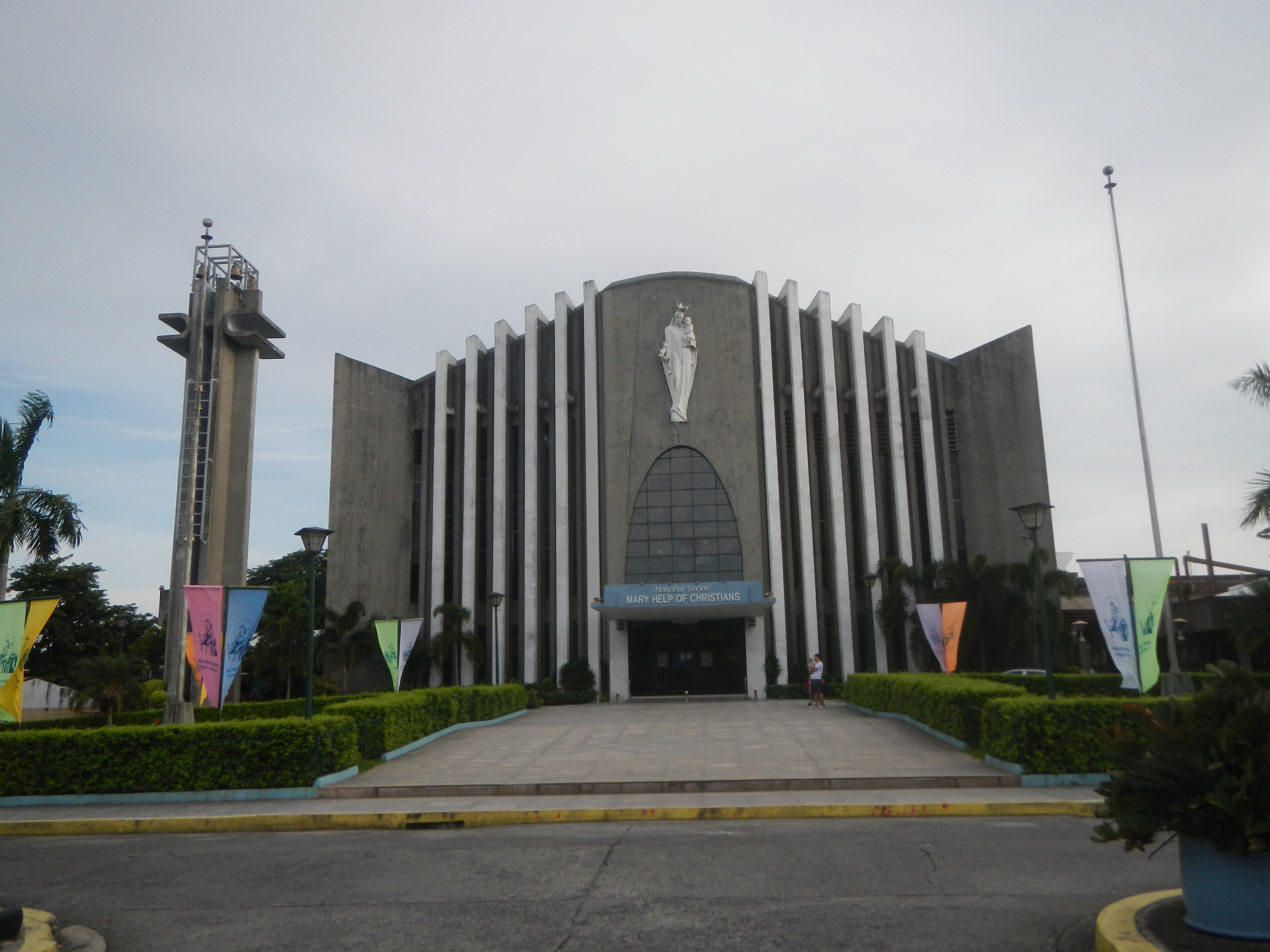
Minor Basilica of the National Shrine of Mary Help of Christians in Don Bosco

Most of Parañaque's population are Christians, mainly Roman Catholic.

Roman Catholic churches in Parañaque are under the jurisdiction of the Diocese of Parañaque. There are two National Shrines, the National Shrine of Our Mother of Perpetual Help (commonly known as the Baclaran Church or Redemptorist Church) and the National Shrine of Mary Help of Christians; the Parañaque Cathedral or the Cathedral Parish of St. Andrew is the oldest church in Parañaque and the mother church of the Diocese of Parañaque. There are about 90 parishes and 2 sub-parishes. El Shaddai, a Catholic charismatic renewal movement, is centered in the city.

Born Again Evangelical Christian Churches Christ Commission Fellowship BF Parañaque, Greenhills Christian Fellowship Sucat, Jesus Is Lord Church Worldwide Parañaque, Word International Ministries, Victory Christian Fellowship Parañaque, Citygate Christian Ministries, South Gate Baptist Church are also located in this city.

The Greek Orthodox Church (from which the icon of the Perpetual Help originated) also has a cathedral in United Paranaque V - the Annunciation of the Theotokos Orthodox Cathedral - the first Orthodox church in Southeast Asia consecrated by the Ecumenical Patriarch of Constantinople. [16]

Other Christian denominations include the Church of Jesus Christ of Latter-day Saints, Iglesia ni Cristo and Members Church of God International. There are also a number of non-Catholic (mostly Protestant) churches in Parañaque.

There is also a minority of Muslims, primarily living on Baclaran. There are mosques in Parañaque.

=== Poverty ===
Poverty incidence of Parañaque (%)

Source: Philippine Statistics Authority

== Economy ==
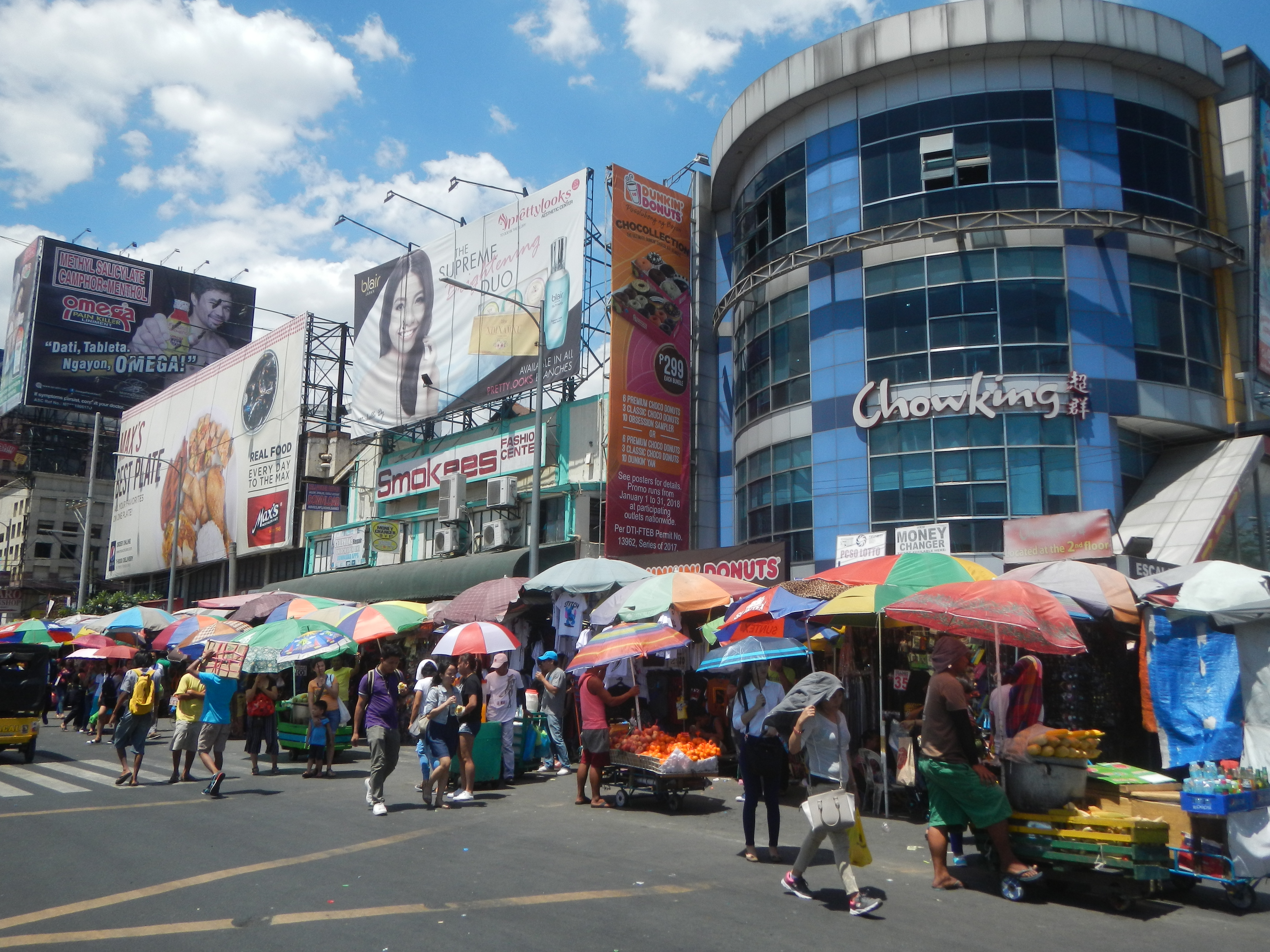
Flea markets in Baclaran

SM City Sucat

Ayala Malls Manila Bay

=== Shopping centers ===
Parañaque also relies on shopping centers as part of its economy. The principal malls include SM City Sucat (opened in July 2001), SM City Bicutan (opened in 2002), and SM City BF Parañaque (opened in 2016), all owned and operated by SM Supermalls of SM Prime Holdings. Ayala Malls Manila Bay, the largest Ayala Mall, started its operation in 2019. Robinsons operates one mall inside BF Homes and one supermarket. Parqal shopping mall is located at Aseana City. There are also smaller malls like Jaka Plaza, Pergola Lifestyle Mall, Aseana Square Mall, and Noah's Place Mall. Walter Mart has two malls of its franchise in Parañaque. Duty-Free Fiesta Mall is also located in Parañaque. Baclaran functions as the city's flea market, primarily selling clothing, especially school uniforms and costumes.

=== Hotel and Gambling ===
Solaire Resort & Casino

Hotels and gambling also form part of Parañaque's economy. Integrated resorts Solaire Resort & Casino, City of Dreams Manila and Okada Manila attract foreign tourists. Closed in 2014, Casino Filipino once served as a casino in the city until the opening of Entertainment City. Cockfighting is also common in the barangays. The Roligon Mega-Cockpit, found in Tambo, is considered as the largest and most modern cockpit in Asia.

== Government ==
Parañaque City Hall

=== Local government ===
Parañaque is composed of two congressional districts and two legislative districts which are further subdivided into 16 barangays. 1st District consists of eight barangays in the western half of the city, whilst 2nd District consists of eight barangays in the eastern half of the city.

The Parañaque City Hall, located in Barangay San Antonio, serves as the seat of the city government. Opened in 1971, it replaced the Presidencia, the old municipal hall in Barangay La Huerta that is now occupied by the Ospital ng Parañaque. It will also have a satellite office in Entertainment City.

== Culture ==
=== Festivals ===
Parañaque is famous for its lively festivals, such as the Caracol, a festival that revolves around boats.

The Sunduan Festival is a tradition in the city that depicts the act of a man fetching the object of his affection from the woman's home to bring her to church or the town plaza. Both festivals are held around February 13 to 15 for Parañaque's ciryhood anniversary.

The city stages the Senakulo, a reenactment of the Passion of Jesus, during Holy Week, the Pasko ng Pagkabuhay during Easter, and the Santacruzan, a procession reenacting the search of the True Cross of Christ, in May. Shortly thereafter, the Flores de Mayo, a festival commemorating the discovery of the cross by Queen Elena (mother of St. Constantine), is held.

An outstanding feature of Parañaque is the cultivation of its cultural traditions such as the komedya and bati-bati, among others, that continue to attract local and foreign tourists alike, especially around the dry season months of April and May.

Parañaque is known for sabog, a form of cockfighting constrained in coliseums.

== Sports ==
Parañaque Coliseum

Parañaque's only professional sports team are the Parañaque Patriots of the Maharlika Pilipinas Basketball League (MPBL). The Patriots are one of the ten founding members of the MPBL, beginning play in the 2018 season. The Patriots play their home games at Olivarez College Gymnasium at the campus of Olivarez College.

The Parañaque Coliseum in Barangay San Dionisio serves as the city's main sports arena, designated to host local sports programs as well as Parañaque's basketball and volleyball team.

== Transportation ==
=== Railway ===
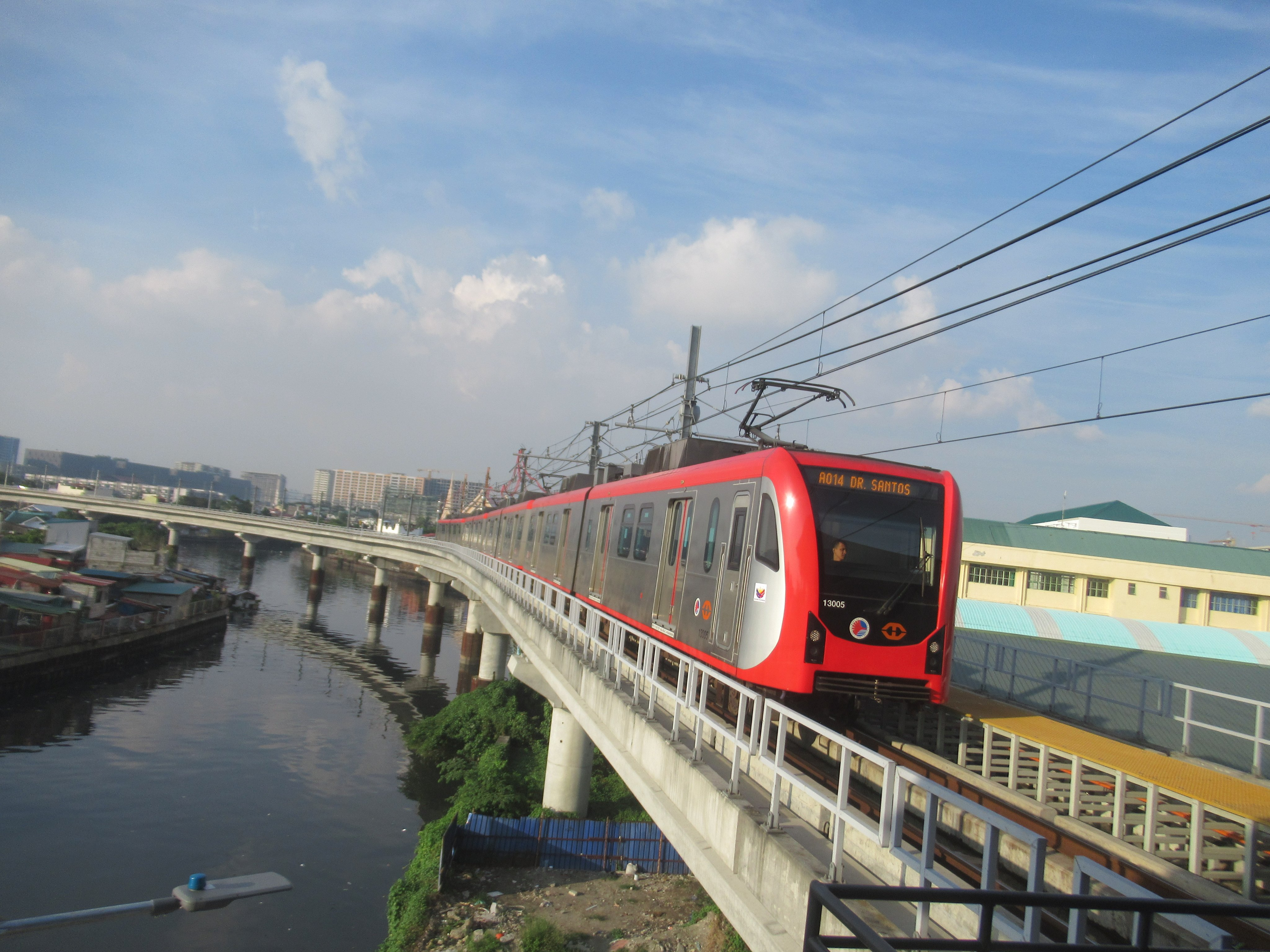
A train of the LRT Line 1 crossing the Parañaque River towards Ninoy Aquino Avenue station

Parañaque is served by the LRT-1 and the PNR (via Bicutan station).

Parañaque is served by the LRT-1 via Redemptorist-Aseana, MIA Road, PITX, Ninoy Aquino Avenue, and Dr. Santos stations since LRT-1 South Extension (Cavite Extension) began its operation on November 16, 2024. The line is to be extended to Bacoor. The older Baclaran station also serves the city, although it is located in Pasay, near its city boundary with Parañaque.

On the other hand, the PNR's South Main Line operations are suspended since 2024 due to the construction of the elevated North–South Commuter Railway with a station at Bicutan. The station is also tentatively planned as part of the Metro Manila Subway.

=== Airport ===
NAIA Terminal 1

Parañaque is the location of Terminal 1 of Ninoy Aquino International Airport as the airport complex sits on the Pasay-Parañaque border. The terminal is accessible via Ninoy Aquino Avenue and is where many major international airlines operate.

=== Land ===
==== Road network ====
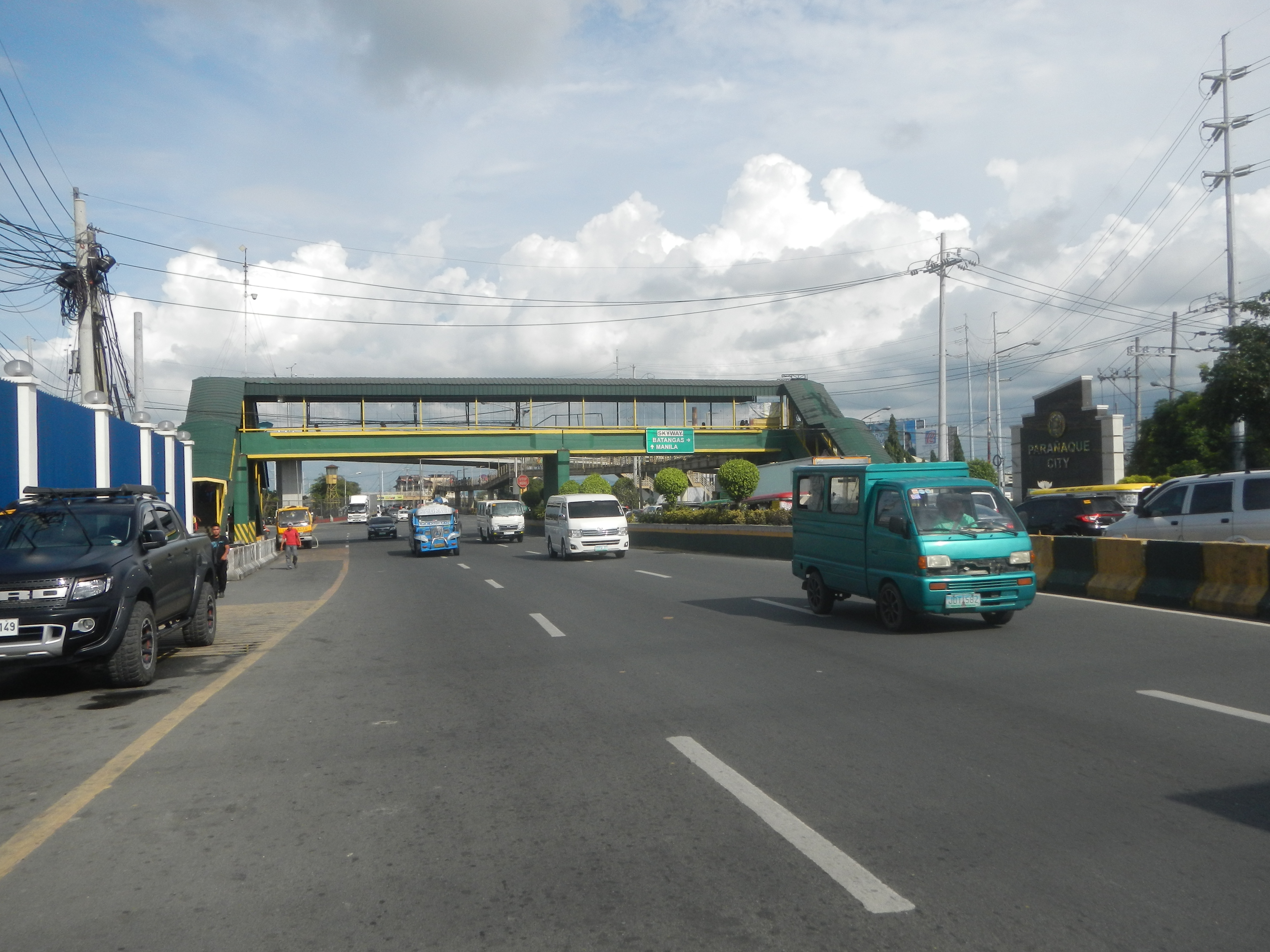
Dr. Arcadio Santos Avenue near SLEX at the city boundary of Parañaque. Formerly called Sucat Road, the avenue functions as Parañaque's main thoroughfare.

Parañaque is served by a network of expressways and arterial roads.

Expressways, like Skyway, South Luzon Expressway (Skyway At-Grade), and Manila-Cavite Expressway (CAVITEX), connect the city with the rest of Metro Manila and Calabarzon. The at-grade portion of Skyway in Parañaque has two service roads, namely the West Service Road and East Service Road, which both serves the communities and businesses lying near the expressway. The NAIA Expressway is an elevated airport expressway that connects Ninoy Aquino International Airport, CAVITEX, Skyway and Entertainment City. The section of CAVITEX–C-5 Link from Santo Niño to CAVITEX is under construction and will directly connect Circumferential Road 5 (C-5) with CAVITEX.

Dr. Santos Avenue (formerly Sucat Road), Roxas Boulevard, Doña Soledad Avenue and Quirino Avenue function as the city's principal arterial roads. Carlos P. Garcia Avenue (C-5 South Extension), which has been involved in land ownership controversies involving then-Senator Manny Villar, serves as secondary arterial roads.

BF Homes Parañaque is served also by a network of arterial roads, serving residential and commercial areas within it.

==== Public utility vehicles ====
Similar to other cities in Metro Manila, public utility vehicles (PUV) such as buses, jeepneys, tricycles, and UV Express ply throughout Parañaque to serve commuters. The Parañaque Integrated Terminal Exchange (PITX) serves as an intermodal transport hub for PUVs. PITX is also interconnected to its namesake LRT station.

== Education ==
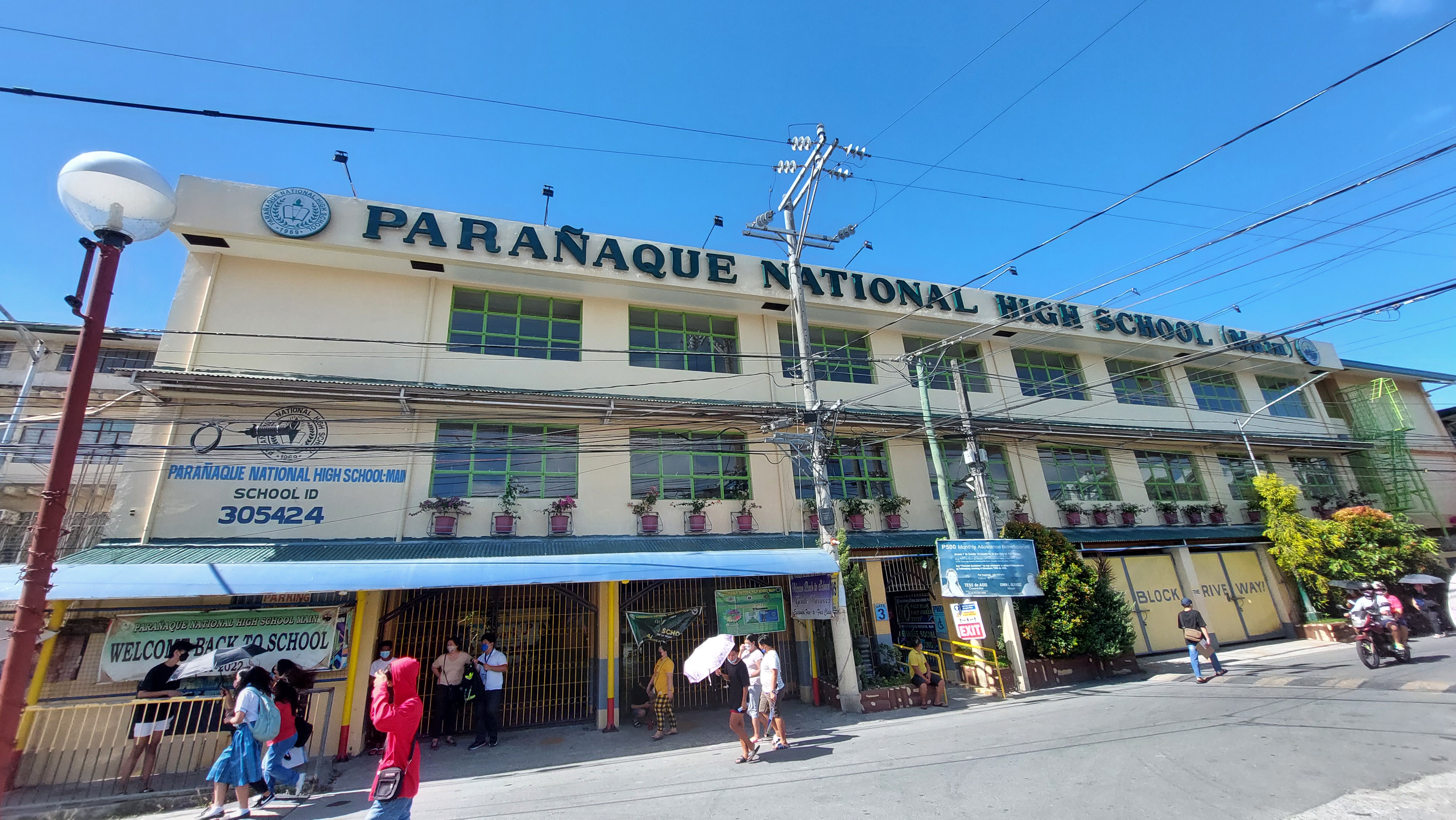
Parañaque National High School

Parañaque has a diverse educational system with specializations in various academic and technical fields. It is home to many schools and colleges such as PATTS College of Aeronautics which focuses on producing students specialized in the realm of Aviation around the world, Olivarez College, the only school accredited with both the Philippine Accrediting Association of Schools, Colleges and Universities (PAASCU) and the Philippine Association of Colleges and Universities - Commission on Accreditation (PACUCOA) which specializes in Health-Related Sciences such as Nursing, Radiologic Technology, Physical Therapy, and Midwifery, Parañaque Science High School, St. Andrew's School (oldest private school in Parañaque, established 1917), St. Paul College of Parañaque, Manresa School, Sacred Heart School, Ville St. John Academy and Ann Arbor Learning Center amongst many others.

As of 2024, the Department of Education's Division of Parañaque City oversees elementary schools and secondary schools in the city. Additionally, an annex of Sucat Elementary School, which is under the Schools Division Office (SDO) of Muntinlupa City, is located in Sitio Pagkakaisa in barangay San Martin de Porres.

== Notable personalities ==
- Andi Abaya - actress
- Kobe Brown - actor, singer
- Manuel Bernabe - politician, journalist, and poet known for as the author of the hymn No Mas Amor Que El Tuyo
- Ken Chan - actor
- Jaime Ferrer - 12th Secretary of the Interior and Local Government, World War II guerilla and freedom fighter
- Most Rev. Francisco De Leon - 4th Bishop of the Roman Catholic Diocese of Antipolo
- Teresita de Castro - de jure 24th Chief Justice of the Supreme Court of the Philippines
- Roilo Golez - former legislator, former congressman, and former National Security Adviser
- Freddie Webb - actor, comedian, radio host, former PBA player and former Senator
- Leila de Lima - lawyer, former Senator and former Secretary of the Philippine Department of Justice
- Risa Hontiveros - activist, politician, Senator
- Pilita Corrales - singer, actress, comedian, TV host
- Joey Marquez - actor, comedian, TV host, former politician, former basketball player
- Edwin Olivarez - politician, incumbent mayor & former congressman
- Anjo Yllana - actor, comedian, TV host, endorser, former Councilor and former Vice Mayor
- Simone Rota - footballer
- Val Sotto - actor, comedian, former City Councilor
- Jennylyn Mercado - actress
- Alma Moreno - actress, TV host, dancer, Councilor (1st District)
- Roselle Nava - singer, actress, TV host, former Councilor (1st District)
- Jomari Yllana - actor, dancer, Councilor (1st District)
- Eric Fructoso – actor, comedian, dancer
- Karen Davila - broadcaster, TV host, reporter
- Henry Omaga-Diaz - broadcaster, TV host, reporter
- Dolphy - actor, TV host, Comedian, endorser
- Gina Pareño - actress
- Andrew E. - rapper, TV host, comedian
- Geoff Eigenmann - actor, TV host, former MYX VJ, endorser
- Gerphil Flores - singer
- Enrique Gil - actor, dancer, model, TV host
- Bianca Gonzalez-Intal - TV host, endorser, Pinoy Big Brother: Celebrity Edition third celebrity placer
- Max Eigenmann - actress, singer and model
- Phoemela Barranda - model, host, actress, endorser
- Ken Chan - actor, singer, TV host, photographer, endorser
- Rita De Guzman - actress, singer, TV host, former p pop member of sugapops
- Bianca Manalo - Binibining Pilipinas-Universe 2009, actress, TV host, former PAL Flight Attendant
- Loisa Andalio - ex-PBB Housemate, actress, TV host, dancer, former P Pop member of Girltrends
- Japs Sergio -former bassist/vocals of Rivermaya
- Gian Magdangal - singer, TV host, actor, stage actor
- AJ Perez - blogger, motivational speaker
- Sam Pinto - actress, model, TV host, former PBB Housemate
- Stef Prescott - actress, TV host, StarStruck Batch 4 Avenger Alumni
- Sue Ramirez - actress, TV host, model, endorser
- Khalil Ramos - singer, actor, TV host
- Ram Revilla - actor
- Biboy Rivera - bowler
- Mariel Rodriguez-Padilla - actress, TV host, former MTV VJ
- Bianca Umali - actress, TV host, endorser
- Dimples Romana - actress, TV host, endorser, former UAAP Courtside Reporter & Grand Winner Bb. Parañaque City 2000
- Jake Roxas - actor
- RJ Padilla - actor & Former PBB Housemate
- Gabbi Garcia - actress, TV host
- Lloyd Cadena - YouTube Vlogger, radio DJ, comedian
- Dominic Ochoa - actor, comedian, TV Host
- Korina Sanchez-Roxas - broadcaster, TV host, pet advocate
- Pinky Webb - broadcaster, TV host, reporter
- Jason Webb - former basketball player, sportscaster and Councilor (1st District), coach and sports commentator
- Andrea Abaya - ex PBB Housemate, TV host, actress, model
- Wendell Ramos - actor, TV host, comedian
- Sheldon Gellada - Bassist of the Hale Band
- Jondan Salvador - PBA Basketball Player for Barako Bull
- Reynante Jamili - former Filipino Boxer
- Richard Hwan - ex PBB Housemate & Model
- JC de Vera - actor, TV host
- Ricky Davao - actor, director
- Therese Malvar - actress, TV host, model
- Yam Concepcion - model, actress, dancer
- Andi Manzano - TV host, radio host, model, former MTV VJ
- Christian Vasquez - actor, model, former PBB Celebrity Housemate
- Michael Christian Martinez - Filipino figure skater who represented the Philippines at the 2014 Winter Olympics and the 2018 Winter Olympics.
- Lincoln Cortez Velasquez (Cong TV) - vlogger
- Fred Payawan - actor, model
- Mimiyuuuh - vlogger, Comedian, endorser
- Vandolph - actor, comedian, endorser & Councilor (1st District)
- Winwyn Marquez - TV host, actress, model, former beauty queen
- Alexa Ilacad - actress, singer, former Goin' Bulilit member, and former PBB housemate
- KD Estrada - actor, singer-songwriter, former PBB housemate

== Sister cities ==
=== Local ===
- Cebu City
- Panabo, Davao del Norte
- Tagum, Davao del Norte
- Iloilo City
- Malabon, Metro Manila
- Las Piñas, Metro Manila
- Pasay, Metro Manila
- Navotas, Metro Manila
- Tangub, Misamis Occidental
- Bacolod

=== Foreign ===
- Haeundae District, Busan, South Korea
- Carson, California, United States

== See also ==
- Roman Catholic Diocese of Parañaque
- Nuestra Señora del Buen Suceso de Palanyag
- Parañaque Cathedral
- Parañaque River
