= Jesús Balmori =

Filipino writer (1887–1948)

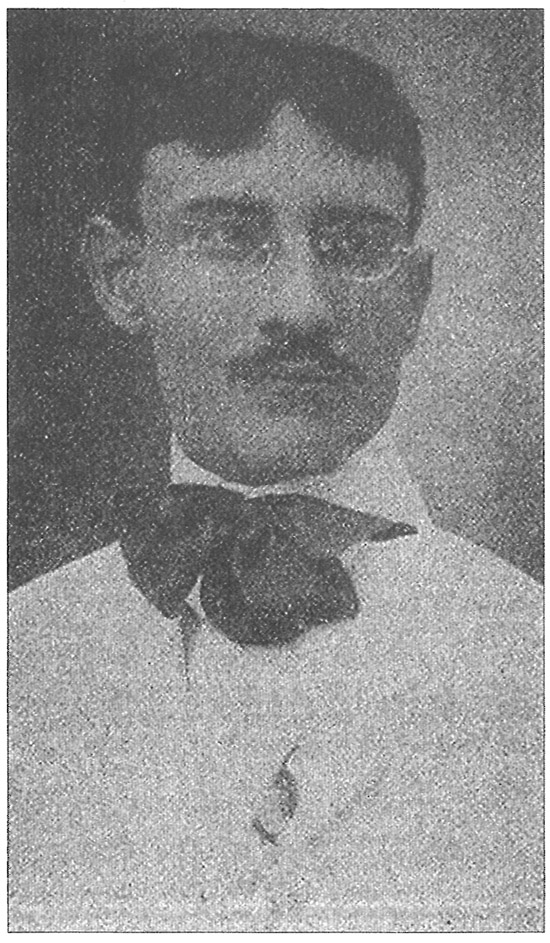
- Balmori in 1916
- Born: Jesús Balmori y Rivera; January 10, 1887; Ermita, Manila, Captaincy General of the Philippines
- Died: May 23, 1948 (aged 61); Manila City, Philippines
- Resting place: La Loma Cemetery
- Citizenship: Filipino
- Education: Colegio de San Juan de Letran; University of Santo Tomas
- Occupations: writer, journalist, poet, playwright, historian, linguist
- Writing career
- Pen name: Batikuling
- Language: Spanish

Signature
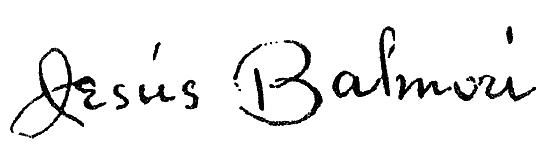

Jesús Balmori y Rivera (January 10, 1887 – May 23, 1948) was a Filipino Spanish language journalist, playwright, and poet.

== Biography ==
Jesús Balmori y Rivera was born in Ermita, Manila, on 10 January 1887 to Juan Balmori y Arévalo and Pantaleona Rivera from Bacolor. He studied at the Colegio de San Juan de Letrán and the University of Santo Tomás, where he excelled in Literature. He was married to Dolores Rodríguez. Joaquín Balmori y Rivera, a pioneer labor leader and foremost organizer of labor unions in the Philippines, was his brother.

In his early years, Balmori was already gathering literary honors and prizes for poetry. In a Rizal Day contest, his three poems, each bearing a different pen name, won the first, second, third prizes. Later, he figured in friendly poetical jousts, known as Balagtasan (in reference to Tagalog poet Francisco Balagtás), with other well-known poets in Spanish of his time, notably Manuel Bernabé of Parañaque and the Ilonggo Flavio Zaragosa Cano, emerging triumphant each time.

Before the war, under the pseudonym "Batikuling", Balmori wrote a column called "Vida Manileña" for La Vanguardia, a daily afternoon newspaper. It was a trenchant critique of society’s power elite, showcasing his gift for irony and satirical humor, as well as serious verses. After the war, he wrote a similar column, "Vida Filipina", for the Voz de Manila. However, the number of Spanish-speaking readers was already diminishing by that time.

It was his work as a lyric poet, however, on which his fame and reputation rested.

== Literary works ==
In 1904, when he was 17, he published his first book of verses, Rimas Malayas; it was noted for its spiritual and nationalistic themes. A second volume containing his satirical verses, El Libro de mis Vidas Manileñas, came out in 1928.

In 1908, his poem "Gloria" was adjudged first prized winner in a contest sponsored by the newspaper El Renacimiento. In 1920, another poem, "A Nuestro Señor Don Quijote de la Mancha", received the major award in a contest promoted by Casas de España. He reached the pinnacle of his success as a poet in November 1938 when his Mi Casa de Nipa, a collection of his best poems, gave him the first prize in the national literary contests held under the auspices of the Commonwealth Government, as a part of its third anniversary celebration.

Critics began to notice his literary skills more when he joined a contest sponsored by El Renacimiento in commemoration of Rizal Day. Three of his poems won. These were "Specs", "Vae Victis" (Woe to the Victor), and "Himno A Rizal" (Hymn to Rizal).

In 1940, his Mi Choza de Nipa (My Nipa Hut), another volume of poetry, won grand prize in a contest sponsored by the US-sponsored Commonwealth Government.

He wrote three novels: Bancarrota de Almas (Bankruptcy of Souls), Se Deshojó la Flor (The Flower Has Lost Its Petals), and Pájaros de Fuego (Birds of Fire) which was completed during the Japanese occupation. The themes of these novels revolved around the issues of sensuality, the privacy of morality, the existence of God, and man's limitations in society. He also wrote three-act dramas, which were performed to the capacity crowd at the Manila Grand Opera House: Compañados de Gloria, Las de Sungkit en Malacañang, Doña Juana LA Oca, Flor del Carmelo, and Hidra.

In 1926, he and Bernabé were awarded the Premio Zóbel for his contributions to Philippine literature.

Balmori also collaborated with periodicals such as El Renacimiento, El Debate and La Voz de Manila.

== As ambassador ==
Balmori was sent abroad as Philippine Ambassador of Goodwill to Spain, Mexico, South America, and Japan. In Spain, Generalissimo Francisco Franco decorated him with the Cross of the Falangistas.

== Death ==
He was traveling in Mexico when he suffered partial paralysis. He died of throat cancer on 23 May 1948, shortly after writing his last poem, "A Cristo" (To Christ), which he dedicated to his wife. At the time of his death, he was a presidential technical assistant and a member of the Philippine Historical Research Committee.

== Bibliography ==
- Ihrie, Maureen; Oropesa, Salvador (2011). World Literature in Spanish. An Encyclopedia. Vol. I. ABC-Clio. ISBN 978-0-313-33770-3.
- 80 Años del Premio Zóbel by Lourdes Brillantes, Instituto Cervantes y Fundación Santiago, Manila, 2001
- Jesús Balmori, Los pájaros de fuego, edición crítica de Isaac Donoso, Manila, Instituto Cervantes, 2010.
