= Manuel Bernabé =

Filipino journalist, politician, linguist, and poet

The Honorable Manuel Bernabé
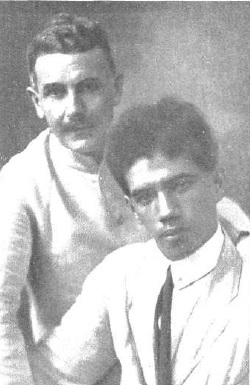
- Bernabé (right) with Salvador Rueda (left) in 1915
- Born: February 27, 1890; Parañaque, Manila, Captaincy General of the Philippines
- Died: November 29, 1960 (aged 70); Parañaque, Rizal, Philippines
- Citizenship: Filipino
- Education: Ateneo Municipal de Manila (BA); University of Santo Tomas (Law)
- Occupations: Poet, journalist, politician, teacher
- Writing career
- Notable works: Cantos del Tropico; Perfil de Cresta
- Notable awards: Premio Zóbel (1926); El Yugo y las Flechas (1940); Order of Isabella the Catholic (1953)

Member of the House of Representatives of the Philippine Islands from Rizal's 1st district
- In office June 5, 1928 – June 2, 1931
- Preceded by: Basilio Bautista
- Succeeded by: Pedro Magsalin

Personal details
- Party: Democrata

Manuel Bernabé y Hernández (February 27, 1890 – November 29, 1960) was a Filipino journalist, politician, linguist, and poet in Spanish and Latin languages. He was given the title "King of Balagtasan" in Spanish.

== Early life ==
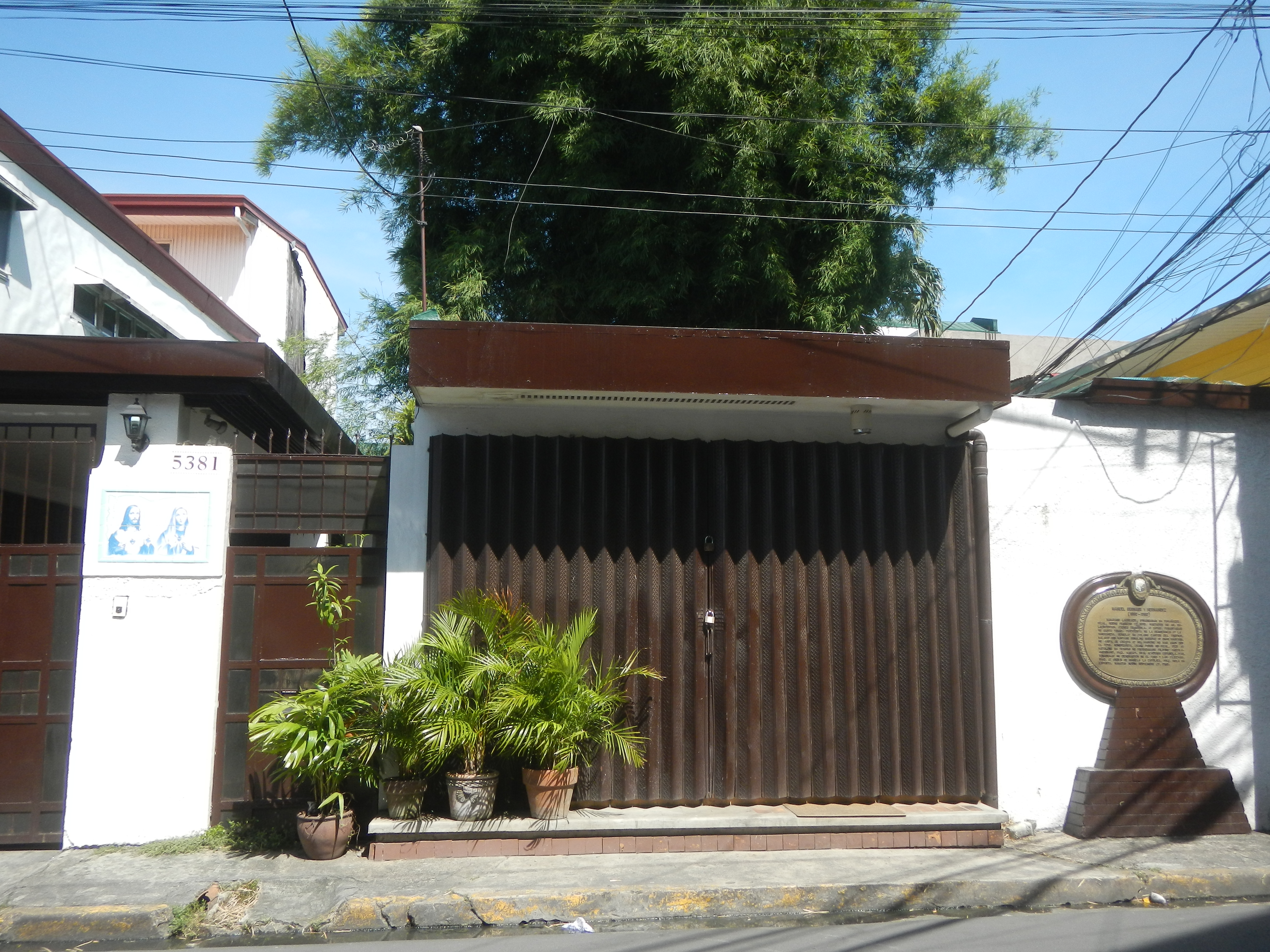
Bernabé's residence in La Huerta, Parañaque

Bernabé was born on February 17, 1890, in Parañaque to Timoteo Bernabé, who would later serve as the municipal president of Parañaque, and Emilia Hernandez. He was only nine years old when he began to write verses in Spanish and by the age of fourteen, he was already speaking Latin.

Bernabé earned his Bachelor of Arts degree at Ateneo Municipal de Manila as a valedictorian. There, he translated Virgil's Aeneid from Latin to Spanish. He later took up law at University of Santo Tomas.

== Career ==
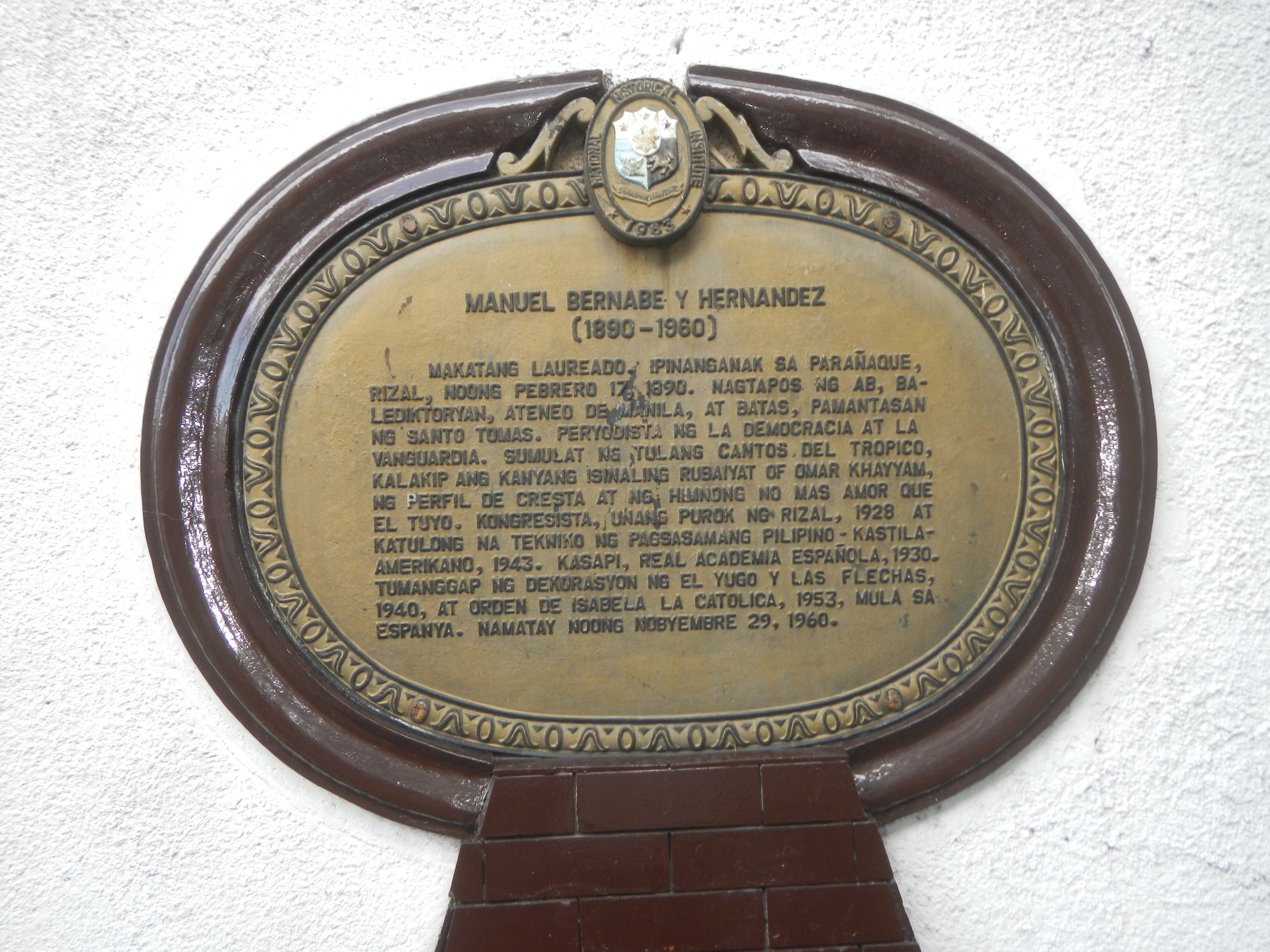
Historical marker

=== Literature ===
After graduating from law, Bernabé joined the newspaper La Democracia and then La Vanguardia before becoming a contributor to Excelsior. He taught Spanish at the University of Santo Tomas, University of the Philippines, Far Eastern University, Philippine Law School and Colegio de San Juan de Letran.

Bernabé was a lyric poet, and the usual subject of his poems are festivals and celebrations although he can cover any subject. The collection of poems written by him is titled Cantos del Tropico. Another book by Bernabé that also contains his writings is the Perfil de Cresta, which includes his translation of Omar Khayyam's Rubaiyat and Claro M. Recto's portico. Bernabé's other poems are: No Mas Amor Que El Tuyo, El Imposible, Canta Poeta, Castidad, Mi Adios a Ilo-ilo and España en Filipinas.

In a balagtasan where he and Jesus Balmori fought on the subject of El Recuerdo y el Olvido, no winner was revealed because they were both good but in the sound of applause after the balagtasan, it appeared that Bernabé attracted the audience.

=== Politics ===
As a politician, Bernabé was elected as a representative from the 1st district of Rizal in 1928 and served for one term until 1931. He retired from politics and returned to La Vanguardia. He was appointed technical assistant for Filipino–Spanish Relations at Malacañang, serving from 1943 to 1947.

He was later appointed head of the National Library of the Philippines in the 1950s, where he translated Marcelo H. del Pilar's writings to Tagalog.

== Awards ==
As early as 1913, Bernabé had already won three awards from three different organizations for his works Himno al Sagrado Corazon de Jesus, El Zapote, and España en Filipinas.

In 1926, he and Balmori were awarded the Premio Zóbel for their work Hombre y mujer. Because of his efforts to use the Spanish language as a medium of writing, he was conferred the award El Yugo y las Flechas in 1940 and Order of Isabella the Catholic in 1953. He was honored at the University of Santo Tomas as the best poet in Spanish in 1950.

== Notable works ==
- Cantos del Tropico
- Perfil de Cresta

== Death and legacy ==
Bernabé died on November 29, 1960.

The Manuel Bernabé Research Writing Contest, which existed until the mid-1990s, was named after him.
