= José María del Mar =

Filipino journalist, editor and publisher (1896–1982)

José María Lasala del Mar (March 19, 1896–June 20, 1982), also known as Joe, was a Filipino journalist, editor, and publisher of La Prensa, a Spanish language daily newspaper of Cebu City.

del Mar was a writer, orator, playwright, theater actor, politician and authority on the Spanish Language. He won the 1965 Zobel Prize for Literature for his article "Perfiles" published (in Spanish) in the 1963 edition of La Opinión newspaper. He founded La Prensa (The Press) newspaper. He was a former chief of the Bureau of Labor.

In the early years, he also administered and wrote for La Opinion (Manila) and Expectador and Precursor Newspapers in Cebu. In 1914 he joined the newspaper staff of Filemon Sotto's La Revolución, and in the next year became the treasurer of Cebu's Asociación de la Prensa (Press Association).

del Mar received a Royal Order from President Francisco Franco of Spain for his work with the Spanish Language. Because of his specialization in the Spanish Language he became the Director of the Spanish section of The Advertiser Newspaper.

== Career ==
- 1918 – Became a member of Cebu's advisory board for Census under Mayor Fructuoso Ramos.
- 1919 – Wrote for El Espectador, newspaper owned by Manuel C. Briones (Representative of Cebu's Old First district). During the same year, Joe was elected to the Municipal Council of Cebu under the Political Party of Mayor Fructuso Ramos, Nacionalista. He was also the Spoke person of F.Ramos because of his great oratory skills.
- 1921 – Became the Chief of the Bureau of Labor of Cebu.
- 1927 - 1928 – Nacionalista candidate of Cebu's Fourth district Representative but lost to Juan Alcazaran.
- 1929 – Founded his own newspaper The La Prensa (The Press) with the help of his friend, Buenaventura Rodriguez.
- 1937 – 1940 – Became the Executive Secretary of lifelong friend Cebu Governor Buenaventura Rodriguez because of his writing and oratory skills.
- 1963 - Won the 1965 Zobel Prize for Literature for his Spanish article “Perfiles” published in the 1963 edition of La Opinión newspaper.

== Education and personal life ==
Joe finished his secondary education at Colegio de San Carlos and then studied and finished his Bachelor of Laws in Escuela de Derecho (School of Duties) which would later be named Manila Law College.

With his aunt Feliciana del Mar-Florido, joined the stage plays of Buenaventura as Artistas (Actors & Actresses) during his younger days. He was also a judge for Spanish oratorical contests in Cebu.

He married Rosario Chiong Veloso, the first cousin of Sergio “Serging” Osmeña Jr. He was also a close friend of Serging's father Don Sergio, because of their friendship he became a member of the planning committee for the arrival activities of Don Sergio Osmeña in 1921, they were also group mates in the Cebu Association of Manila in 1920.

Del Mar and Rosario raised successful children. One of them is former North District Representative, Congressman and Deputy House Speaker Raul del Mar. Others include Jose del Mar (Businessman), and Dr. Mariano del Mar (Medical doctor).

Del Mar is the son of Mariano del Mar (teacher and school owner) and Juanita Lasala, a Spanish mestiza and sister of Sor. Apolonia Lasala, the 1st Sister Superior of Colegio de la Inmaculada Concepción (CIC).

J.M. del Mar Street, which runs through Cebu IT Park, is named after him for his contributions to Cebu.

Information taken from the manuscript records of Dr. Michael Cullinane, associate director of Southeast Asian Studies at the University of Wisconsin.
