= Enrique G. Centenera =

Journalist from the Philippines

Enrique Garchitorena Centenera was a journalist from Naga City, Camarines Sur, the Philippines. He came from the prominent mestizo clans of Garchitorena and Centenera. A journalist, he was already a contributor to Voz de Manila and El Debate when he was a student at the Ateneo de Manila. He also studied law at the University of Santo Tomas and founded his own publication, La Nacion.

In 54 years of devotion in promoting Hispano-Filipino, he has published several short stories, novels, essays, and Spanish textbooks. He was editor of Spanish newspapers in the Philippines, like La Defensa, La Vanguardia, and El Debate. At the University of Santo Tomas and Feati University, he was a professor of Spanish for many years. He was also the adviser to the student organ, Voz Estudiantil in the UST.

Particularly, he promoted Hispanism in the Philippines when he was the vice-president of the Sociodad de Escritores Hispano-Filipinos. He was a recipient of Premio Zobel in 1981.
