= Premio Zobel =

Literary prize in the Philippines for Spanish language

Premio Zóbel
- Awarded for: Excellence in Philippine literature in Spanish language
- Country: Philippines
- Presented by: Zóbel de Ayala family
- First award: 1922

The Premio Zóbel is a Philippine literary award conferred on Filipino writers in the Spanish language. It was established to revivify the Spanish language and to promote the best writing created by Filipino authors in the language. Founded in 1920, it is the only literary prize in Asia that promotes Spanish-language literature, and is also the oldest literary award in the country.

== Mechanics ==
The primary objective of the Premio Zóbel is to give recognition Filipino writers in and advocates for Spanish language. The candidate must possess Spanish fluency. Awardees are judged members of the Philippine Academy of the Spanish Language. In recent years, the criteria in selecting the winners had broadened. They may or may not need to have written a body of work, as the recognition can be given to anyone who champion the Spanish language.

== History ==
The Premio Zóbel was founded by businessman and philanthropist Enrique Zóbel de Ayala in 1920, considered to be the oldest literary award in the Philippines and the only literary prize in Asia dedicated to promoting the Spanish language. Zóbel advocated for the preservation of linkage between the Philippines and Spain through culture and the cultivation of Philippine literature in Spanish. He established the award amidst the American colonization in the first few decades of the 20th century, the rise of the English language as medium of instruction in schools, and the waning of the use of the Spanish language as lingua franca in government and the elite. He was quoted to have said, "No quiero que el español muera en Filipinas. ("I don’t want Spanish to die in the Philippines.")" The award was continued by his daughter, Gloria Zóbel de Padilla, after his demise.

The awarding ceremony had been previously held at the Casino Español de Manila. It was later moved to the InterContinental Manila hotel. At its height, it was a literary and social event covered extensively in the media.

== Present ==
Currently, the award is organized under the leadership of the children of Gloria Zóbel de Padilla - Georgina Z. Padilla de Mac-Crohon and Alejandro Z. Padilla.

The history of Spanish language in the Philippines, history of the Zóbel de Ayala family, history of the Premio Zóbel, and short biographies of past winners as well as excerpts of their work are contained in the book, "81 Years of Premio Zóbel: A Legacy of Philippine Literature in Spanish". Written by the 1998 awardee professor Lourdes Brillantes, it was supported by Spanish Ambassador Delfín Colomé Pujol and the Fundacion Santiago for the Philippine Centennial.

== List of winners ==
Below is the list of awardees through the years.

| Year | Awardee | Works |
|---|---|---|
| 2000 | Lina Obieta De Sevilla | Founder of Fundacion de la Lengua Hispanica en Filipinas |
| 1999 | Rosario Gonzalez-Manalo | |
| 1998 | Lourdes C. Brillantes | |
| 1997 | Isabel Caro Wilson | |
| 1996 | Francisco C. Delgado | |
| 1995 | José S. Arcilla | |
| 1994 | Jaime Sin | |
| 1993 | Blas F. Ople | |
| 1992 | Napoleon G. Rama | |
| 1991 | Dom Gabriel Casal | |
| 1990 | Alejandro R. Roces | |
| 1989 | Rosalinda Orosa | |
| 1988 | Miguel Ma. Varela | |
| 1987 | Juan José Rocha | |
| 1986 | Raúl S. Manglapus | |
| 1985 | Antonio M. Molina | Historia de Filipinas |
| 1984 | Lelilia Cortés Fernández | |
| | Carlos De La Rosa | |
| 1983 | Bartolomé Briones | |
| | Diosdado Talamayan | |
| 1982 | Belén S. Argüelles | |
| | Severina Luna de Orosa | |
| 1981 | Enrique Centenera | |
| | Edmundo Farolán | Tercera Primavera |
| 1980 | Rosario Valdés Lamug | |
| | Delfín G. Gumbán | |
| 1979 | Arturo R. Calsado | |
| | Luis Garchitorena | |
| 1978 | Federico Espino Licsi | |
| | Luis Garchitorena | |
| 1977 | Lourdes J. Custodio | |
| | Enrique O. Muñoz | |
| 1976 | Amado Yuzon | |
| | Francisco C. Palisoc | |
| 1975 | Guillermo Gómez Rivera | El Caserón |
| 1974 | Bienvenido De La Paz | |
| 1966 | Benito Valdéz Vaccani | Latidos (Vibrations) |
| 1965 | José Ma. del Mar | Perfiles (Profiles) |
| 1964 | Nilda Guerrero | Barranco Nostalgias |
| 1963 | León Ma. Guerrero | El Sí y El No (Yes and No) |
| 1962 | Vicente Padriga | Vino Viejo en Odres Nuevos (Old Wine in New Bottles) |
| | Alejo Arce | El Bicolano y su Ambiente (The Bicolano and His Environment) |
| 1961 | Juan Martínez | Cucullú Flaquezas |
| | Francisco Zaragoza | Castalia Intima |
| 1960 | Antonio L. Serrano | Orgullo de Raza |
| | Fernando De La Concepción | Cumbre Y Abismo |
| 1959 | Emeterio Barcelón Y Barceló Soriano | Soriano Un Tagalo Escribe En Español |
| | Vicente Guzmán Rivas | En España Son Así |
| | César T. Mata | Modismos Castellanos |
| | Sixto Y. Orosa | El Patriotismo en Las Poesías de Rizal |
| 1957 | Esperanza Lázaro De Baxter | Romancero Sentimental (Romances) |
| 1955 | José P. Bantug | Bosquejo Histórico de la Medicina |
| | Adelina Gurrea Monasterio | A Lo Largo del Camino |
| 1954 | Enrique Fernández Lumba | Hispanofilia Filipina |
| 1953 | Joaquín Lim Jaramillo | Las Figuras Y La Crítica Literaria |
| | Vicente De Jesús | Apolíneas |
| 1941 | Francisco Rodríguez | Cuentos y Ensayos |
| 1940 | Luis Guzmán Rivas | Pigmeos |
| 1939 | Rafael S. Ripoll | Esbozos |
| 1938 | Francisco Varona | Negros |
| | Manuel De Los Reyes | Prontuario de Palabras Y Frances Mal Empleadas en Filipinas |
| 1937 | Antonio Fernández Salmos de Oro | (Psalms of Gold) |
| | Vicente Zacarías Arévalo | Facetas (Facets) |
| 1936 | Ramón Escoda | El Canto del Solitario (The Song of the Lonely) |
| | Benigno Del Río | El Hjo de Madame Butterfly (The Son of Madam Butterfly) |
| | Antonio Ma. Cavanna Escarceos | Literarios (Literary Attempts) |
| 1935 | Evengelina Guerrero Zacarías | Kaleidoscopio Espiritual |
| | José Reyes | En Aras del Ideal |
| 1934 | Pedro Aunario | En el Yunque Cotidiano |
| | Alejo Valdés Pica | De La Vida |
| | Pacífico Victoriano | Arpegios |
| | Francisco Villanueva | Trabajo literario |
| 1933 | Buenaventura L. Varona | El Nieto de Cabesang Tales |
| 1932 | Dra. Inés Villa | Filipinas en el Camino de Cultura |
| 1931 | Jose R. Teotico | Del Momento Hispánico |
| | Román Joven | Crónicas e Interviews |
| 1930 | Leoncio González Liquete | Repertorio Histórico, Biográfico |
| | María Paz Mendoza Guázon | Notas de Viaje |
| 1929 | Antonio Abad | La Oveja de Nathan (Nathan's Sheep), novel |
| | Flavio Zaragoza Cano | Mis escudo de Nobleza/ Cruz Espada y flor |
| 1928 | Antonio Abad | El Ultimo Romantico, novel |
| | Manuel Rávago | Peregrinando (On a Pilgrimage) |
| 1927 | Joaquín Ramírez de Arellano | Mrs. Morton |
| 1927 | José Hernandez Gavira | Lo Que Vimos En Joló y Zamboanga; Sus |
| 1926 | Jesús Balmori | Hombre y mujer |
| 1926 | Manuel Bernabé | |
| 1925 | Enrique K. Laygo | Caretas |
| 1924 | Manuel Bernabé | Rubaiyat |
| 1923 | Buenaventura Rodríguez | La Pugna |
| 1922 | Guillermo Gómez Windham | La Carrera de Candida |
