= Arellanes =

Arellanes is a surname. Notable people with the surname include:

- Frank Arellanes (1882–1918), American baseball player
- Gloria Arellanes (1946–2024), American activist
- Jim Arellanes (born 1974), American football player

== See also ==
- Arellano (surname)
