= Erasma Arellano =

Filipino sprinter

Erasmo Arellano was a Filipino track and field athlete. As a member of the Philippine men’s track and field team, he was a bronze medalist for the 4 × 400 metres relay in the 1958 Asian Games.
