= Joaquín Ramírez de Arellano =

Filipino lawyer, professor and journalist

Joaquín Ramírez de Arellano (fl. 1927) was a lawyer, professor and a journalist in the Philippines.

== Career ==
He was a lawyer and a Spanish professor in the University of Santo Tomas. He then ventured into journalism wherein he worked as a reporter and then editor-in-chief of La Defensa.

== Award ==
He was a recipient of the Premio Zobel in 1927 for his dramatic comedy Mrs. Morton.
