= 1959 anti-American riots in Panama =

The 1959 anti-American riots in Panama happened during the celebration of Panamanian separation on November 3, 1959. Demonstrations started that day as Panamanians were influenced by former foreign minister Aquilino Boyd, who threatened a "peaceful invasion" of the American-controlled Panama Canal Zone, to raise the flag of the republic there as tangible evidence of Panama's sovereignty over the territory.

Fearful that Panamanian mobs might actually force entry into the Canal Zone, the United States called out its troops. Several hundred Panamanians crossed barbed-wire restraints and clashed with Canal Zone police and troops. A second wave of Panamanian citizens was repulsed by the Panamanian National Guard, supported by American troops. Extensive and violent disorder followed. A mob smashed the windows of the United States Information Agency library. The United States flag was torn from the ambassador's residence and trampled, and the U.S. embassy was attacked. Stones were thrown against the troops, who were dispersed by tear gas. Three American troops were injured, whilst two student protesters were arrested.

Aware that public hostility was getting out of hand, political leaders attempted to regain control over their followers but were unsuccessful. Relations between the two governments were severely strained. United States authorities erected a fence on the border of the Canal Zone, and United States citizens residing in the Canal Zone observed a voluntary boycott of Panamanian merchants, who traditionally depended heavily on these patrons.

Tensions were already stoked before amid the discontent over the Canal Zone. In May 1958 students demonstrating against the United States clashed with the National Guard, and nine peopled died in the violence. On September 17, 1960, American President Dwight D. Eisenhower attempted to defuse the issue by letting the Flag of Panama fly alongside the Stars and Stripes of the U.S. inside the Canal Zone. After the events of 1959, violence occurred again in 1964.
