= International Maritime University of Panama =

Coordinates: 8.94546°N 79.56236°W

The International Maritime University of Panama (in Spanish: Universidad Marítima Internacional de Panamá, UMIP) is a maritime college in Balboa, Panama City.

Today, the Maritime university is experiencing one of its best times. Their cadets are recognized for their leadership, respect, honor, loyalty, discipline, and non-tolerance of dishonest acts. It belongs to the international association of maritime universities, being the only one in Central and South America to achieve this step.

Its main building (Building 810 in Albrook) was severely damaged by a fire in January 2008, although there were no injuries or fatalities. The fire is believed to have started in a storage area on the building's top floor.

UMIP was established by a law passed in 2005, and it absorbed the former Escuela Náutica de Panamá, which was founded in 1958.

The university's rector (president) is Víctor Luna Barahona.

== Cadets Corp ==
To create leaders, the UMIP established and executed a discipline system Cadet Corp, proposed and defended by all, which institutes the habits that eventually become culture, as a result of the individual. The UMIP trains cadets by leading them through a continuous and focused process in the enhancement of values and competences that train the individual for life and for work in the sea.

Under command of the merchant marine captain, Eduardo Thompson, UMIP has a strong and stable cadet regiment. The regiment is divided between platoons: Alpha, Bravo, Charlie, Delta, Echo, Band Company and the outstanding Honor Guard. In addition to the captain, the cadets choose among them their representatives before the school of leadership, who are:

- Brigadier higher
- Executive Brigadier
- Administrative Brigadier
- Leadership chief
- Chief of student dining room
- Chief of Alpha platoon.
- Chief of Bravo Platoon
- Chief of Charlie Platoon
- Chief of Delta Platoon
- Chief of Echo platoon
- Honor Guard Chief
