= Early life and education of Jose Rizal =

Filipino writer biography

José Rizal, a Filipino writer, was born on June 19, 1861, in Calamba, Laguna, to Francisco Engracio Rizal Mercado y Alejandro and Teodora Morales Alonzo Realonda y Quintos. He developed a mature and respectful personality when he was a child. In his early life, he became interested in clay sculpting and the arts. When he was nine, he studied in Biñan, Laguna, and was taught by a strict teacher. Rizal then traveled to Manila to start his secondary education in the Ateneo de Manila University. His departure was delayed due to his brothers involvement in the 1872 Cavite mutiny and was influenced by his mother's arrest. Nevertheless, he improved his sculpting and skills in the arts. He was a boarder during his last two years in Ateneo and garnered a lot of prizes there. Upon receiving his Bachelor of Arts diploma, he entered the University of Santo Tomás, where he studied philosophy in the first year and medicine in the second.

Due to incidents during his tertiary education, he decided to travel to Europe to continue his studies. After five days, the steamer, Salvadora, finally arrived in Singapore and subsequently arrived at Marseille. He saw the famous port and went by train to Barcelona, crossing the rugged Pyrenees. He then went to Madrid and enrolled in two of the Central University of Madrid's courses (Medicine and Literature and Philosophy). After reading Eugène Sue's "The Wandering Jew," he decided to make a novel detailing the conditions in the Philippines, turning into "Noli Me Tángere." In 1885, he traveled to Paris, where he completed a large part of the novel and specialized in ophthalmology. He then traveled to Heidelberg and Leipzig before settling in Berlin, completing "Noli Me Tángere" there. Through funding from Doctor Maximo Viola, he printed the novel. Rizal then went to Dresden, Austria, Vienna, Rome, and Italy, before boarding a mailboat in Marseille and going back to the Philippines.

== Early life ==
=== Birth and early childhood ===
Rizal's parents

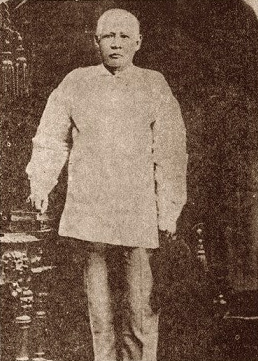
Francisco Rizal Mercado (1818–1898)

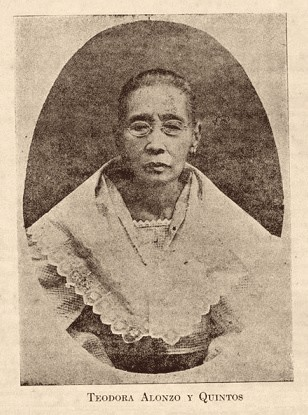
Teodora Alonso Realonda (1827–1911)

José Protasio Rizal Mercado y Alonzo Realonda was born in Calamba, Laguna, on June 19, 1861. He was the seventh child of Francisco Engracio Rizal Mercado y Alejandro, his father, and Teodora Morales Alonzo Realonda y Quintos, his mother. Rizal had Chinese ancestry, with his paternal ancestor being a Chinese godfather named Lam-co. He had many other ethnic elements, with many other ancestors being immigrants to the Philippines. His family had built a new home shortly before Rizal's birth, located at the city center of Calamba. In a nearby church, Rizal was christened when he was three days old. As bands outside Calamba were there for a festival, music was a feature of the event. He was first trained by two Germans, William and Alexander von Humboldt; he was not a physically strong child, but he was taught by his mother, who, nearly without books, gave Rizal a foundation of knowledge. Through being taught and read to by his mother and one of his elder sisters, he learned the alphabet at three years old. He also spent most of his time at church; instead of being religious, he wanted to watch the people.

His father and brother concerned themselves with his artistic and physical training. He sometimes drew pictures without stopping. He liked to play with clay and sometimes wax. His sculptures of animals and nature were praised by his relatives, with some telling him to continue studying nature and sculpting. Rizal also had a pony that he rode through the surrounding area. He also had a large, black dog named Usman, which accompanied him through adventures on foot. He alternated between walking and riding on his horse, inspiring some of his customs during his stay in Europe. Sometimes, Rizal was allowed to have an overnight stay in straw huts Laguna farmers set up in the harvest season. The myths and legends in the region were sometimes used in his writings. He enjoyed watching sleight-of-hand tricks and making magic-lantern exhibitions, twisting and shaping the lanterns. Neighbors enjoyed looking at the lanterns, successfully catering to the public's taste.

According to historian Austin Craig, since Rizal was a baby, he had a "grown-up way" about him; he respected the rights of citizens and convinced elders to talk with him rather than to instantly scold him. He kept his promises of better behavior to the elders and, even as a child, was not an unwelcome companion to adults. He was also not disruptive and troublesome and followed moods. Due to his relationship with Father Leoncio Lopez, he became more mature. According to John Foreman, a writer staying in the Philippines, Father Lopez was "impressive," respecting the opinions of others and speaking respectfully. Father Lopez conversed with Rizal respectfully, and when it was time to ask questions, he explained carefully. A recollection of Rizal's childhood was his first reading lesson. Since he did not know Spanish, he stumbled and messed up on the story "Foolish Butterfly," a story his mother picked. Teodora then read the book in Tagalog, the language used in their home. When he was four, one of his little sisters died, causing him to cry tears of sorrow. When he was seven, he made his first trip by visiting Antipolo, visiting the mountain shrine of Our Lady of Peace and Safe Travel. A souvenir of the travel, a print of the Virgin, was placed in Rizal's wooden chest.

Due to Teodora's literary training, she was acquainted with good Spanish writers, benefiting her children; she told them stories for children. A Bible also played a large part in Rizal's childhood, with the Vulgate, the copy of the Bible Teodora had, being referenced in his works. As church, civil, and military authorities found the Rizal mansion a good resting space when going to their health resort, the family often had many visitors. Sometimes, the house was filled with many visitors, with Teodora serving them all. Even though Rizal, as a child, barely knew Spanish, his mother encouraged him to study the language more, causing him to become better. Rizal once made a Tagalog drama that pleased a municipal official of Paete who happened to attend while visiting Calamba, leading to Rizal being paid two pesos.

== Education ==
=== Primary and secondary ===
When he was set to study in Biñan, he was nine years old. His teacher, Justiniano Aquino Cruz, was strict and disciplinary, treating students under him with some of his concepts being to "spare the rod and spoil the child" and "the letter enters with blood." Cruz also, according to Craig, taught well, and after only a few months under his care, he was told by Cruz that "he knew as much as his master" and told to study in Manila. Even though his father did not support that claim, stating that pupils were not allowed to say they know as much as their masters, Cruz supported the claim and Rizal was set to go to Manila, with preparations starting on Christmas vacation of 1871. Being in Biñan led Rizal to know his father's relatives, since they originated there.

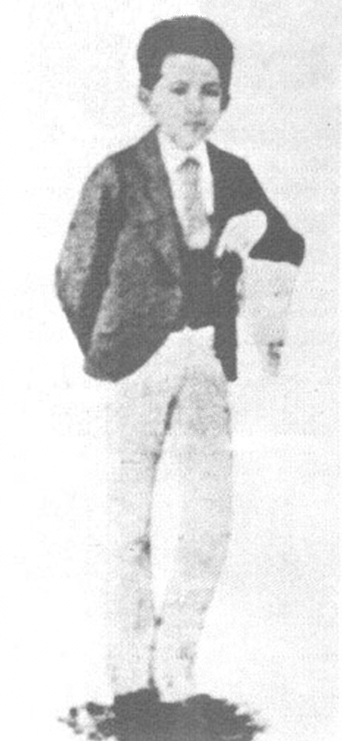
Rizal, 11 years old, a student at the Ateneo Municipal de Manila

As Rizal was set to travel to Manila, his departure was delayed as his brother, Paciano Rizal, was acquainted with Doctor José Burgos, who was executed by the Spanish government due to the 1872 Cavite mutiny as part of the Gomburza. Rizal eventually arrived in Manila and stayed at the nipa house of Manuel Hidalgo in Calle Espeleta. His studies in Manila officially started in June 1872; Rizal first went to San Juan de Letran to take entrance examinations for Ateneo, a popular school at the time with a long waiting list. He went back to Calamba, passing the examinations for Ateneo. He received praise for his arithmetic skills, too. He was highly influenced against the Spanish judicial system during his secondary schooling as his mother was held in prison for two years even though she was innocent. As the case was handled by a judge who did not receive proper attention in the Mercado home as he demanded, she was sentenced to prison. She was told to walk around the Laguna de Bay lake afoot to annoy her, but in a village, she was invited as a guest of honor. Due to the judge's angriness, he went in the house and beat the owners. Eventually, the Supreme Court ordered her discharge from custody, leading the judge to order her release, but the judge then gave a longer sentence to her, with the Supreme Court siding with the judge. She was eventually released.

During his secondary schooling, a banner that originated in Manila was accidentally damaged before a festival that planned on using it. Desperate, the gobernadorcillo went to Rizal's home and explained his need. Rizal immediately produced a painting that officials lauded better than the banner. Sometimes, he continued his clay modeling in the brickyard of one of his cousins in Makati. After the death of Burgos, Paciano retired and started farming in Manila. "The Count of Monte Cristo" was the first foreign book read by Rizal. The book that had the most influence on Rizal was "Travels in the Philippines," which detailed the travels of a German naturalist (Jagor) who had visited the Philippines. A prophecy made by Jagor that detailed the Philippines' decline due to the colonization of the Spanish and the global industrialization inspired Rizal to make Filipinos "prepare themselves for a freer state" and to make the United States colonize the Philippines instead of Spain. Other than sculpting, Rizal also enjoyed carving. Once, he carved an image of Virgin Mary with "such grace and beauty," according to Craig, that a priest asked him to sculpt an image of the Sacred Heart, which Rizal did and created the carving with batikulin, a wood that is easy to carve with and a pocket knife. The priest intended to bring the carving to Spain, but it was left behind and placed in a dormitory door by some schoolboys. The sculpture remained there for nearly 20 years.

Rizal, according to Craig, was highly experienced in clay sculpting, with Craig's analysis of clay working being "a characteristic based on his constant desire to adapt the best things he found abroad to the conditions of his own country," adding that the habit is also found in his literature and the composition of one of his sculptures of a Philippine wild boar. In his time, Thursday was a school holiday. Rizal regularly stayed at the Convent of La Concordia during Thursdays, where his youngest sister, Soledad, worked. As he was a good friend of Soledad, he was a welcomed visitor in the convent. He regularly drew pictures for her edification and sometimes made her own portrait. He also wrote short satirical skits. Some of the girls in the convent influenced Rizal; one time, he adored an older girl who informed him he was to marry one of Rizal's relatives once she had accepted his adoration. During Rizal's last two years in Ateneo, he was a boarder. He won most of the prizes during his stay in Ateneo. Rizal's course in Ateneo, according to Craig, gave him useful knowledge for his future education.

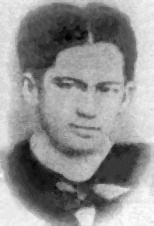
Rizal as a student at the University of Santo Tomas

=== Tertiary ===
Upon receiving his Bachelor of Arts diploma, he entered the University of Santo Tomás, where he studied philosophy in the first year and medicine in the second. Initially, Rizal could not decide his college course, asking the rector of Ateneo for advice. As the rector was in Mindanao at that time, Rizal had already chosen a course by the time the rector's advice arrived. The rector suggested Rizal study agriculture, which Rizal did at the University of Ateneo, leading to him receiving degrees as a land surveyor and agricultural expert. As poetry was widely received in Ateneo, Rizal made essays in verse instead of normally. The writings of a Spanish poet named Zorilla was popular in Ateneo. While his classmates were focused on the warlike features of the literature, Rizal was more fixated on his role and motivation to "restore the Spanish people to their former dignity." The works of Zorilla made a deep impression on Rizal. Some parts of "Junta al Pasig", a melodrama Rizal wrote, were, according to Craig, clearly influenced by his study of Zorilla. In 1877, a society named the Liceo Literario-Artistica (transl. Lyceum of Art and Literature) offered a prize for the best poem written by a native. Rizal won with the composition "Al Juventud Filipino" (transl. To The Philippine Youth). In honor of the fourth death centennial of Miguel de Cervantes, another Liceo competition was organized that was open to Filipinos and Spaniards. Newspapers speak of Rizal winning, but his certificate says second. According to Craig, a compromise by a Spaniard who placed second made Rizal lose the win.

Rizal's poem, titled "El consejo de los Dioses" (transl. The Council of the Gods), gave appreciation to the chief figure in Spanish literature. The rector of Ateneo gave Rizal needed books for his studies, but, as Ateneo and Santo Tomás were rival universities, sentiment against Rizal in Santo Tomás grew exceedingly that Rizal was pressured to continue his education outside the Philippines. He was also the victim of assault in Calamba; he was walking along the barracks of the Civil Guard and saw a large body in the darkness. He passed without paying attention, but the figure was actually a lieutenant of the Civil Guard. The lieutenant drew a sword and stabbed Rizal in the back. His outrage caused him to complain to authorities for connection with the Governor-General, but, due to no response, he accepted that the government did not accept his complaint. After these incidents, Rizal had decided to sail to Europe; his brother, Paciano, gave him 700 pesos, while his sister, Saturnina, supplied him with a valuable diamond ring for a time of emergency.

== Stay in Europe ==
=== Travel ===
Rizal had gone to a festival in Calamba until Manuel Hidalgo notified him that the boat was ready to sail. The telegram asked for his immediate return to Manila utilized a play of words. Among them included the change of his steamer's name, Salvadora, was said as "may save her life." Accompanied by his sister, he traveled to Manila, driving through the walled city and its suburbs. In the journey's five hours, he changed horses twice. He embarked on the steamer the next morning. Before leaving the Philippines, he needed a passport. He used one by the name of José Mercado that was secured by one of his distant relatives. Upon boarding, he sketched the skyline of Manila from afar. He sketched multiple times during the journey; among his sketches were drawings of the Singapore Lighthouse, Suez Canal, and the Castel Sant'Elmo. After five days, the steamer finally arrived in Singapore, then a British colony. Through Rizal's arrival, he saw a modern city for the first time. Rizal then transferred to a French mail steamer. As he studied French in his Ateneo course, even writing an ode, he wanted to "make himself known" on board. When he attempted to speak the language, the French passengers could not understand him. He then tried a mixed system, where he sometimes used Latin words, and when passengers still could not understand him, he made signs and drew pictures of what he wanted. Many of his sketches had humorous touches that made them close to being cartoons, making the passengers and officers on the ship curious. Through this, he was free in the ship and had a joyful voyage. Eventually, he arrived at Marseille. He saw the famous port and went by train to Barcelona, crossing the rugged Pyrenees. He spent a day and rested at the town of Portbou. The disregard of tourists in Spain contrasted sharply with the curiosity Rizal harbored in the voyage to Marseille.

=== Spain ===
In Barcelona, he met many of his schoolmates in Ateneo as well as people who knew him by name. Filipino students regularly held reunions every other Sunday at a cafe; the students could not muster enough money to hold daily visits like the Spanish there. When Rizal arrived, the student group held the reunion at the Plaza de Catalonia, a favorite cafe. In a gloomy mood, he did not hold an optimistic view of his country, highlighting that defects and issues in the Philippines were barely fixed. After, he wrote an article and sent it to a Tagalog newspaper in Manila; the article tackled his views of "love for country" and was described as not as optimistic as his other writings. In his short time in Barcelona, he saw many historic sites around the city. Before leaving, he gathered as many samples from Spain as possible. He also noted many Romans in the country.

Early in fall, Rizal went to Madrid and enrolled in the Central University of Madrid. His short stay in Barcelona was likely to fix irregularities in his passport, since it was easy to obtain a cedula in the town, leading to his enrollment in the Central University to be easier. In the university, he joined two courses: medicine and literature and philosophy. He also studied sculpture, drawing, and art, also taking private language lessons with a teacher named Mr. Hughes, a popular instructor in Madrid. Due to intense studying, he did not have a social life and did not regularly talk with others. He also lacked funds, even though he was given money by his father through his cousin regularly. Rizal watched theater frequently, preferring higher-class dramas while occasionally visiting a masked ball. He also played the lottery regularly and devoted most of his money in buying books. Most of the books Rizal bought were second-hand, but he also bought several standard books. Some of the books he first purchased were a Spanish translation of "Lives of the Presidents of the United States" and the "History of the English Revolution." He also bought a book titled "History of the Presidents."

In Madrid, a Philippine social club-like group organized by elder Filipinos and Spaniards was formed to quietly assist in the conditions of the Philippines. Due to the younger majority, the group became more radical and the older conservatives left the group. The youth met many times to fix the group, yet no conclusion was found. As Rizal was present in some of these meetings, he shared an idea that involved a book telling the conditions of Filipinos with illustrations by Filipino artists as a means of propaganda. The project was first criticized heavily, but a few members supported the idea and meetings were planned for the book's contents. However, in the meeting, most of the members wanted to write about the regular Filipino woman, yet most of the subjects were not interested in the project. Disgusted, Rizal left the plan.

Early in his Madrid stay, he bought a second-hand copy of Eugène Sue's "The Wandering Jew." According to Craig, it was undeniably "the most powerful book...[in] the century." In his diary, Rizal wrote that the book affected him powerfully, causing him to sympathize with the unfortunates in the book. Through this, Rizal decided that a book about Philippine conditions would arouse Spain. He used his youthful memories and recollections of his companions, writing and revising them. Eventually, this project turned into the novel "Noli Me Tángere." Rizal had then started his studies in English in 1884. He weekly visited the home of Don Pablo Ortigas y Reyes, a Spaniard who was the former Civil Governor of Manila, where many Filipino students gathered and were entertained by his daughter, Consuelo.

Rizal often found relaxation through playing chess; he often played with former Spanish republic president Francesc Pi i Margall. Rizal was sometimes accused of being German due to his incline to Anglo-Saxon safeguards for freedom. He was also part of events in Filipino circles, sometimes leading them, like when he delivered the principal address at a Madrid-Filipino colony banquet that honored Filipino painters Juan Luna and Félix Resurrección Hidalgo after they won prizes in the Madrid National exposition. In 1885, he finally completed all of his courses, having credentials in medicine and in philosophy and literature. Rizal then traveled across Spain to study rural people and agriculturists while comparing them to Filipinos. He found that Spanish farmers were not as badly treated as Filipinos.

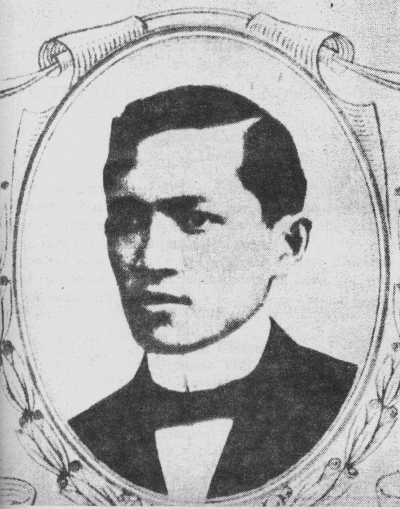
Rizal in London, 1888

=== Rest of Europe ===
In fall of 1885, he was in Paris, studying art and visiting numerous French museums connected to Filipino artists, as there were many Filipinos in France after the 1872 mutiny. Rizal wrote a quarter of "Noli Me Tángere" while specializing in ophthalmology due to his mother's growing blindness. While studying ophthalmology, he became the favorite student of Doctor L. de Weckert, one of the most popular oculists in France. Shortly after, Rizal went to Germany, continuing his study of German. He attended the 500th anniversary of the Heidelberg University. He could only attend lectures as he had no passport. He lived in a student boarding house with other law students and participated in the local Chess club, a popular feature of the town. After, Rizal went to Leipzig and then to Berlin, where he connected with other Filipino men. Through Doctor Rudolf Virchow, Rizal became a member of the Berlin Anthropological Society. He lived in the third floor of a lodging house that was close to the university. In this room, he put the latter half and finishing touches of "Noli Me Tángere." His view changed from arousing the Spanish public to showing the Filipinos their shortcomings in the book. "Noli Me Tángere" was printed in a neighbouring street and was printed for a cheap price, much less than the printing prices of neighbouring countries. Yet, Rizal was not able to cover the expenses until Doctor Maximo Viola visited him; Rizal told him that he was awaiting funds from home but, due to Viola's interest, he helped pay the publishing fee. After the money from his family arrived, Rizal paid Viola. After viewing many places in Germany, they arrived at Dresden, where Doctor A. B. Meyer, a German who visited the Philippines to study Filipinos, visited them.

In Austria, he visited Doctor Ferdinand Blumentritt, whom Rizal had long corresponded. Rizal and Viola stayed at the Hotel Roderkrebs and were guests at the table of Blumentritt, whose wife cooked them the cuisine of Hungary. While Blumentritt and his visitors were talking about Philippine matters, Rizal made a sketch of Blumentritt. From the region named "Austrian Switzerland," they went on to Vienna, where they received a letter of welcome from novelist Nordenfels and were entertained by the Concordia Club. After seeing Rome and Italy, they boarded the French mail in Marseilles and went back home to Manila.
