= Gaspar Vibal =

Gaspar A. Vibal is the executive director of Vibal Foundation. As book collector, he pioneered the creation of Filipiniana.net (a "fully featured digital library and research portal") and WikiPilipinas.org, two of the foundation's flagship projects. As a balikbayan from New York City, Gaspar is a scion of a family long-established in the Philippine book publishing and commercial printing industry. His parents are Hilarion Palomer Vibal (1908–1988) and Esther Asuncion (1923-2020). Hilarion was a writer, editor, and publisher. He is known as the co-founder of Vibal Publishing House, Inc., the Philippines' biggest publishing house. He was among the first generations of Filipino writers in English. On April 30, 1950, Hilarion met and married Esther at the time he was recruited by Ramon Roces's associate D.H. Soriano to become the business editor of Evening News. Gaspar's mother Esther, on the other hand, is a writer, publisher, businesswoman, socio-civic worker, lifetime member of the prestigious Girl Scouts of the Philippines and philanthropist. As incumbent president of Vibal Publishing House Inc. (VPHI), she is known internationally as the first Asian and Filipino world president (1983) of Inner Wheel Club, a socio-civic organization formed by wives of Rotary International. She was the founder of Philippine Women's Studies project and member of the board of trustees of UP Center for Women's Studies Foundation, Inc. (UP CWSFI), a commissioner of the National Commission on the Role of Filipino Women, and was the president of the National Council of Women of the Philippines (1990).

Vibal earned a Bachelor of Science degree in business economics from the University of the Philippines. He worked for 2 decades in the Philippine and American publishing industries. In 1983 Vibal migrated to New York to study at the New York University Book and Magazine Publishing Institute.

== Online Ventures ==
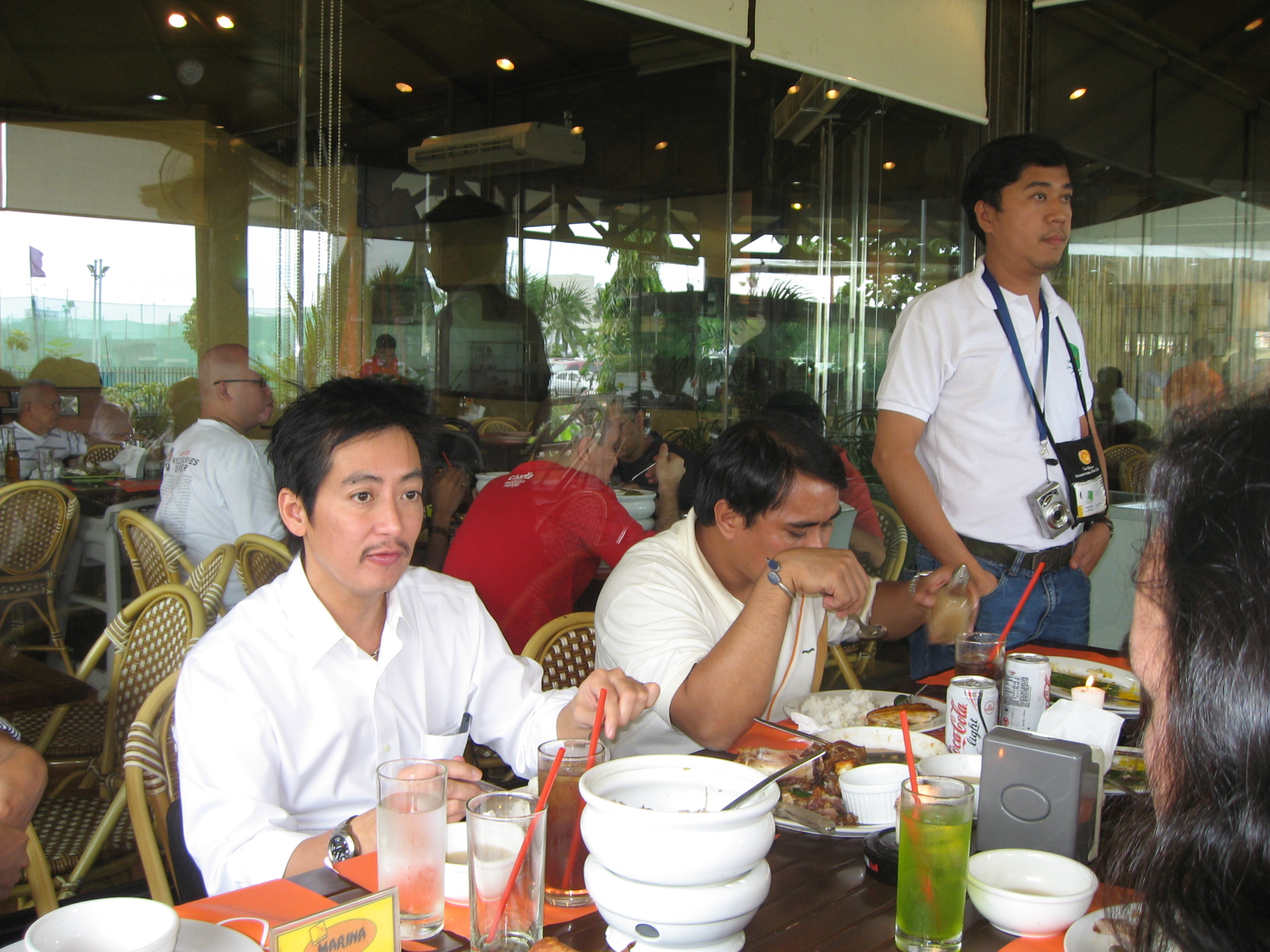
Gus Vibal (founder) and staff of WikiPilipinas at Wikipedia:Meetup/Manila 2

=== WikiPilipinas ===
Gaspar brought Wiki to the Philippines by the creation of his WikiPilipinas which introduced the 'copyleft' IPR model of Wikipedia. The WikiPilipinas team, headed by webmaster Richard Grimaldo (internet and telecommunications administrator of the Vibal Group of Companies) and Alfred Ursua as its managing editor , were responsible for Gaspar's initial Project Wikipiniana. Gaspar projected for the long tail phenomenon or effect (Wired Magazine editor Chris Anderson) of this Philippine Wiki encyclopedia to give more prominence to Filipino culture on the Internet. Vibal complained that "almost all the articles in Wikipedia are written from a Western point of view". But aiming not just for balance, Vibal opted more for "a national campaign to foster nationalism". And like many local editions of Wikipedia, Wikipilipinas already suffers from the "frog in the well" syndrome: a regional ghetto of interest only to angry nationalists protesting that the Philippines is doomed and that it's all someone else's fault. On March 15, 2008, Vibal's WikiPilipinas created WikiFilipino, for Filipino culture and information. It is managed by Alfred Ursua, with web support by Richard Grimaldo, and guidance by Roberto T. Añonuevo.

=== Filnet and ESP ===
Gaspar's Filipiniana.net is a digital library and online research portal "that houses the most comprehensive collection of Filipino- related documents that are in the public domain, from letters from Spanish Governor-General Pedro de Acuña to King Philip III to an obscure 1933 Philippine romance novel entitled "Ang Magmamani", and makes it all available to the public at no cost at all". Launched on November 23, 2006, it was Richard Grimaldo's web development and applications expertise that was crucial in the development of Filipiniana.net to spearhead Vibal's vision "of democratizing Filipino access to information about the Philippines through the internet." It digitized rare and out of print books, documents, and images and publishing them online without any cost to the readers. VIBAL Publishing's 1980 Educational Service Program (ESP) was a brainchild of Gaspar Vibal, and has "evolved to become a full-scale teacher-training program with year-round seminars and workshops to help teachers and school administrators nationwide meet the increasing demands and challenges posed by their profession".

Vibal stated that: "Today, it (Filipiniana.net) has one of the widest and most comprehensive collection of hard-to-find Filipiniana books and documents categorized under history, geography, culture, government, and society. It also features photographs, maps, paintings and illustrations, the Virtual Philippine Revolutionary Records, 100 Nobelang Tagalog, Virtual Blair and Robertson, and the Master Union Bibliography of the Philippines, 100 Pinoy Komik Serials, Premio Zobel.org, and Archivo General de Filipinas." Vibal also announced the forthcoming birth of his brainchild e-turo.org.

=== e-turo.org ===
On June 12, 2008, the 110th Philippine Declaration of Independence day, e.turo.org was created by the Vibal Foundation, (owned by Gaspar Vibal and his family) a nonprofit organization which previously launched Filipiniana.net, and WikiPilipinas.org (a reference guide on the Philippines). Tin Mandigma, editor-in-chief of E-turo.org explained that it is an e-learning portal which "seeks to provide free and quality learning materials online to teachers and students; it gives teachers access to lesson plans and modules based on textbook materials published by Vibal Publishing House, Inc. amid plans to offer Department of Education-approved content from various learning institutions as supplementary teaching materials. One of the most common complaints of teachers is that while the Internet has so much information, most of it cannot be adapted to the local classroom. With this project, we hope to help teachers sort through the clutter and give them quality information that would be useful for their students."

== Controversy ==
Amid the Department of Education's controversy on recent textbook project, Vibal Publishing House Inc. admitted that it had interlocking ownership with an affiliate, the LG and M Corp, but denied accusations of being the leader of a cartel. Vibal and LG and M formed a consortium regarding the publication and delivery of 17.5 million elementary textbooks and teaching manuals for public elementary and high schools funded by P 800-million loan ($40 million) World Bank loan. Contracts were awarded in September, 2006 to Vibal and Watana Phanit, inter alia, despite a pending Supreme Court petition filed by losing bidders. Further, Gaspar clarified that Wikipilipinas "should be treated as a separate entity from his family's publishing business, Vibal Publishing".

== Rizaliana collection ==
Vibal acquired the rare first edition copies of Dr. Jose Rizal's novels, Noli Me Tangere and El Filibusterismo, for his Filipiniana.net. Vibal discovered these at the Old Book Fair in Madrid, Spain in October 2006. These were part of the late Adelina Gurrea Monasterio collection. Vibal stated that: "They are very expensive" – opting to be careful not to reveal the price, for it might put the prized items in danger. Vibal spent 25 years of his life to bring back the original "Noli" and "Fili" to Philippine shores.

Vibal has a 5-inch-thick (130 mm) treasure collection of articles either written by, for, or about Dr. Jose Rizal, antiquated by dust and partly destroyed by termites. His wide collection of Filipiniana (printed works on Philippine history and culture) include:

- One volume of Ricardo Galang's first Philippine Encyclopedia, published in 1939 (there were only 1,000 copies of the 20 volumes).
- One of the early copies of the 1935 Commonwealth of the Philippines Constitution of the Philippines.
- Historian Esteban Ocampo's 40-year-old Rizaliana collection which he salvaged from the Heritage Art Center in Cubao, Quezon City.
- Copies of first editions of Rizal's Noli Me Tangere and El Filibusterismo.

He digitized such historical resources / articles and upload them for free on filipinana.net. and wikipilipinas.org. Vibal and associate, Jaime Marco, initiated the portal with the help of Spanish historian Carlos Madrid.

=== Partners ===
Vibal's partners in the industry were Jeroen Hellingman (Dutch director of Project Gutenberg Philippines, the world's first and biggest provider of free Philippine electronic books); Isaac Donoso Isaac Donoso, Spanish historian in Manila; Dr. Lloyd Espiritu, former dean of the De La Salle College of Computer Studies; University of the Philippines-based historian Grace Mateo; and Georgina Padilla Zobel of Premio Zobel.
