= Charles Derbyshire =

American translator (1880–1933)

- Derbyshire in 1929
- Born: January 17, 1880; Huntington, West Virginia, U.S.
- Died: April 10, 1933 (aged 53); Chillicothe, Ohio
- Occupations: Educator; translator

Charles Edward Derbyshire (January 17, 1880 – April 10, 1933) was an American educator and translator active in the Philippines in the early 20th century. Derbyshire is best known for his English translations of Filipino nationalist José Rizal's novels Noli Me Tángere (1887) and El Filibusterismo (1891), titled The Social Cancer and The Reign of Greed, respectively. Published in 1912, they were the first non-abridged English translations, and were used for decades until they were superseded by León Ma. Guerrero and Soledad Lacson-Locsin's translations.

== Biography ==
Charles Edward Derbyshire was born in Huntington, West Virginia, on January 17, 1880, and graduated from Marshall College (now Marshall University) and West Virginia University. He taught Spanish at Marshall College from 1898 to 1901 before arriving in the Philippines on the transport vessel Thomas. In the country, Derbyshire worked as a teacher from 1901 to 1910, as a translator for the Executive Bureau in 1910 and 1911, and for the Supreme Court from 1911 to 1916. He later resumed teaching at Marshall College. Derbyshire died on April 10, 1933, in Chillicothe, Ohio.

== Rizal translations ==
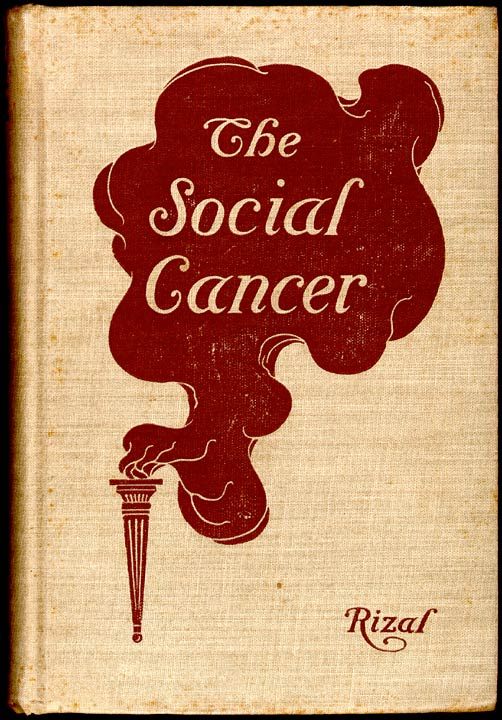
First edition cover of The Social Cancer, Derbyshire's 1912 translation of Noli Me Tángere

During the American colonial period of the Philippines, two heavily abridged English translations of Rizal's Noli Me Tángere appeared in the United States: An Eagle Flight (1900) and Friars and Filipinos (1902). From the original Spanish, Derbyshire produced the first complete English translation of the novel—and the last produced during the colonial period—which he titled The Social Cancer. Derbyshire also translated its sequel El Filibusterismo, which he titled The Reign of Greed. In 1912, his translations were published in Manila by the World Book Company. Derbyshire prefaced The Social Cancer with a 50-page introduction providing context, dated December 1, 1909. Derbyshire also translated Rizal's poems into English, as well as "Elías and Salomé", an unpublished chapter of the Noli, for Rizal's biographer Austin Craig in 1926.

According to Ambeth Ocampo, Derbyshire's translations of Rizal's novels were used for decades before being superseded by newer English translations by Guerrero and Lacson-Loscin. The two translations are available online. As of 2011, The Social Cancer is the most reprinted Noli translation. A revised edition was published by the Philippine Educational Company (PECO) in 1926, with illustrations by Juan Luna and an introduction by Epifanio de los Santos. PECO reprinted this edition in 1927, 1931, 1937, 1948, 1949, 1950, 1956, 1961, 1966, and 1969. It was reissued by Quezon City's Giraffe Books in 1996 and 1999. In 2011, the first bilingual edition of the Noli was launched by the Instituto Cervantes de Manila and the Vibal Foundation. It features Derbyshire's translation and the original Spanish text side-by-side, as well as an introduction by Ambeth Ocampo. A critical edition, it has extensive annotations of Rizal's edits to the manuscript compiled by Isaac Donoso.

There has been limited scholarly analysis of Derbyshire's Rizal translations. In a Philippine Studies article about the Noli's translations, A.M. Testa-De Ocampo wrote that there is "no data regarding [Derbyshire's] motivation or target audience" regarding his translations, but that their publication was representative of a growing English-language audience in the Philippines.
