= Vibal =

Vibal may refer to

- Vibal, trade name for cyanocobalamin
- Gaspar Vibal, Filipino businessman
- Le Vibal, French commune
- Vibal Publishing House, a publishing house in the Philippines
