= WikiPilipinas =

Online, free content encyclopedic website

- Screenshot The main page of the English WikiPilipinas as of September 1, 2022
- Website type: Online community
- Available in: English, Filipino, and other Philippine languages
- Owner: Vibal Foundation
- Creator: Vibal Foundation
- Website: wikipilipinas.org
- Registration: Optional
- Launched: August 29, 2007; 19 years ago
- Current status: Offline

WikiPilipinas (formerly known as Wikipiniana) was an online, free content website which billed itself as a combination "non-academic encyclopedia", web portal, directory and almanac for Philippine-based knowledge. Like Wikipedia, it contains various articles on Philippine-related topics. Unlike Wikipedia, many of the articles cover topics that would otherwise be deemed unencyclopedic by the stricter Wikipedia. The service for example, promotes the concept of original research and eschews the larger encyclopedia's neutral point-of-view principle.

Conceived in late 2006 by Philippine publishing magnate Gaspar Vibal, WikiPilipinas (as Wikipiniana) officially went live on June 12, 2007, with several thousand Philippine-related articles forked from the English Wikipedia. Its name was officially changed from Wikipiniana to WikiPilipinas a few weeks later on July 7. The service was formally launched at the 28th Manila International Book Fair in late August of the same year.

== Overview ==
While it started as a fork of Wikipedia, WikiPilipinas does not fancy itself an "academic encyclopedia" as stated in its official policies and guidelines page. Despite this, the online resource does contain articles on encyclopedic topics such as history, culture, sports, and politics. In addition to those mentioned, WikiPilipinas styles itself as a mash-up of several entities; a "Who's Who" of prominent Filipinos, a directory of institutions and companies, an almanac of the Philippines and a community portal for the different ethnic groups in the Philippines. As an online resource using the wiki model, it bills itself as a collaborative effort-content provider. The most major goal that the wiki has stated is "to build the largest Philippine knowledge database". Like Wikipedia, the contents of WikiPilipinas are open to editing by anyone with access to the Internet. However, editors must register before they are allowed to edit.

WikiPilipinas was particularly launched by the Vibal Foundation, a nonprofit organization which previously created Filipiniana.net, and WikiPilipinas.org (a reference guide on the Philippines). Conjunctively, the Vibal Foundation (per Gaspar Vibal and his mother) made a historical move in Philippine education, when it also launched on June 12, 2008, the 110th Philippine Declaration of Independence day, e-turo.org, as conduit of these 3 landmark education tools. Tin Mandigma, editor-in-chief of E-turo.org explained that it is an e-learning portal which "seeks to provide free and quality learning materials online to teachers and students; it gives teachers access to lesson plans and modules based on textbook materials published by Vibal Publishing House, Inc. amid plans to offer Department of Education-approved content from various learning institutions as supplementary teaching materials. One of the most common complaints of teachers is that while the Internet has so much information, most of it cannot be adapted to the local classroom. With this project, we hope to help teachers sort through the clutter and give them quality information that would be useful for their students."

=== Differences from Wikipedia ===
Although it is modeled after Wikipedia, WikiPilipinas differs from it in distinct ways. Founder Gaspar Vibal describes "improvements" including a directory of web portals based on those of Yahoo!, Inc., and community portals for Filipino ethnic groups. WikiPilipinas guidelines explicitly encourage, "balanced presentation, but not a neutral point of view.", state that WikiPilipinas, "does not believe that any view can ever be neutral" and that fair discussion of an issue is expected. One of the key pillars of Wikipedia is that articles be written from a neutral point of view, a major difference in encyclopedia models. WikiPilipinas supports the concept of original research, something Wikipedia forbids. WikiPilipinas encourages users to, "present their own research and findings on the site" and expects adequate references from editors for factual information. In addition, the site does not have the notability concept that is another cornerstone of Wikipedia. Articles about practically anything are allowed on the site. Also, WikiPilipinas' conceptualization is far removed from that of an academic encyclopedia. The site's policy and guideline page states, "WikiPilipinas is not an academic encyclopedia." Unlike Wikipedia with its strict conflict of interest policy, WikiPilipinas has no rule preventing one from writing about oneself or one's family.

== Content ==
The contents of WikiPilipinas were originally aggregated from a selection of around 15,000 Philippine-related articles of Wikipedia. The addition of original articles began soon after, created by WikiPilipinas volunteers and its editorial team. All text in WikiPilipinas was originally licensed under the GNU Free Documentation License (GFDL), but on March 26, 2011, it migrated to the Creative Commons Attribution-ShareAlike License.

== History ==
WikiPilipinas was originally conceived as Wikipiniana, an open content management system for volunteer members of the Philippine online resource Filipiniana.net. The site initially used the Plone content management system the production of articles was deemed too slow under the system. In September 2006, plans to shift the system to use the wiki-model were conceived (after the founding of Filipiniana.net) by its New York-based founder Gaspar Vibal and webmaster Richard Grimaldo. Octogenarian book publisher Esther A. Vibal, founder of Vibal Publishing House, Inc. (VPHI), and mother of Gaspar Vibal learned about online publishing and knowledge sharing. She introduced the concepts through Gaspar's Filipiniana.net and WikiPilipinas.org, the world's biggest Philippine encyclopedia available on the Web.

The actual conceptualization of WikiPilipinas (then-Wikipiniana) occurred in February 2007. In planning, MediaWiki was officially selected to be the site's platform and it was decided that the site were to be modeled after the Wikipedia. Instead of a complete fork of Wikipedia however, Wikipiniana was to be a "hipper" and "freer" version, including almanac lists and directories. The WikiPilipinas team, headed by Grimaldo as webmaster and Alfred Ursua as its managing editor, drew up an initial masterlist of priority contents for Project Wikipiniana.

The project officially began on March 15, 2007. It was first made available online three months after on June 12 to coincide with the country's official Independence Day. A month after going live, the official name of the service was changed from Wikipiniana to WikiPilipinas on July 7. WikiPhilippines was the term decided upon for the section of the site with articles in English and WikiFilipinas for the section in Spanish. A press-oriented sneak preview of the site was hosted for the local media on August 22 of the same year. The event was attended by major Philippine media outlets such as GMA-7 and RPN-9, print media like the Manila Bulletin, the Philippine Daily Inquirer, and the Manila Times and dozens of Philippine bloggers. In a press release on August 23, the site's publicists claimed to be "the fastest online startup in Philippine history" due to the site receiving 100,000 visitors during the slew of accesses that occurred after the site was covered by the media the previous day.

WikiPilipinas had its official launch during the 28th Manila International Book Fair in late August 2007.

The project itself is owned by the Vibal Foundation, which bills itself as the "corporate social arm" of Vibal Publishing House. It is a sister-project to Filipiniana.net, a Philippine-oriented research portal.

== Technical specifications ==
As a Philippine company, the site's physical servers are situated in Metro Manila in the Philippines. The site was originally hosted on the servers of its sister project, Filipiniana.net. However, a surge of viewers following intense media coverage on August 21, 2007, prompted the site's owners to turn to VConnect Inc. to upgrade the site's hardware. WikiPilipinas is now hosted on an IBM System x 3850 with dual 3 gigahertz Intel Xeon CPUs, 16 gigabytes of RAM and 1.4 terabytes of combined hard drive space. The site's internet connection is provided by IP Converge with a total bandwidth allocation of 10 Mbit/s.

== Impact and public reaction ==
WikiPilipinas has been the subject of several articles by major broadsheet newspapers in the Philippines. The service itself has been covered by GMA Network news in segments on two of the station's daily news programs.

Upon learning of its inception, a few Filipino bloggers questioned the usefulness of WikiPilipinas as a fork of Wikipedia. In a post entitled "Is There Any Point to Wikipiniana?", a Filipino blogger weighed the pros and cons of having an encyclopedia administered to entirely by Filipinos. Filipino blogger and Wikipedian Eugene Alvin Villar questioned the usefulness and purpose of WikiPilipinas in a blog post on July 19, 2007. He argued that the "hip and free encyclopedia"'s policy on articles not needing to adhere to a neutral point of view (as Wikipedia does) was not conducive to an unbiased encyclopedia. With WikiPilipinas being marketed as an encyclopedia "by Filipinos, for Filipinos," Villar pointed out the great possibility of bias in the encyclopedia's articles. Aside from the possibility of bias, he also mentioned that the articles of WikiPilipinas were less likely to rank higher than those of the English Wikipedia in web searches, making effort spent in updating WikiPilipinas articles better spent working on their equivalent Wikipedia articles. He later reiterated some of these concerns in an interview with the Manila Bulletin in September. In the interview, he criticized WikiPilipinas for prioritizing publicity over streamlining the site's policies and guidelines. Notable Filipino blogger Abraham Olandres personally mentioned Villar's criticism of WikiPilipinas. In his post, Olandres agreed that the Filipino-based service would be useless and redundant unless it "came up with its own set of content". In a later entry, Olandres pointed out that WikiPilipinas' lack of a notability guideline could possibly slant it towards a Filipino-centric sense of pseudo-notability.

Kristine Mandigma, the president of the Philippine literacy advocacy group Read-or-Die Foundation, also made a commentary on WikiPilipinas after attending the service's August 22 official press launch. She described WikiPilipinas as "the online version of an omnium gatherum… a motley and captivating assortment of ideas, facts and factoids, emotions, dissertations, and agonized biographies."

The site's credibility was questioned in line with a possible connection to Vibal Publishing House, a local publishing service that was implicated in a controversial textbook scandal. Both the publishing company and WikiPilipinas are owned by the same person, Gaspar Vibal. In an interview with the Philippine Daily Inquirer, Vibal asserted that the wiki project and the publishing house were independent of each other.

== See also ==
- List of online encyclopedias
