= Rizal Law =

Filipino law mandating course option on Jose Rizal

Congress of the Philippines
- Long title: An Act to include in the curricula of all public and private schools, colleges and universities courses on the life, works and writings of Jose Rizal, particularly his novels Noli Me Tangere and El Filibusterismo, authorizing the printing and distribution thereof, and for other purposes.
- Citation: Republic Act No. 1425
- Territorial extent: Philippines
- Passed by: House of Representatives
- Passed: May 17, 1956
- Passed by: Senate
- Passed: May 17, 1956
- Signed by: Ramon Magsaysay
- Signed: June 12, 1956

Keywords
- Jose Rizal, education
- Status: In force

The Rizal Law, officially designated as Republic Act No. 1425, is a Philippine law that requires all educational institutions in the Philippines to offer courses about José Rizal. The Rizal Law was emphatically opposed by the Catholic Church in the Philippines, mostly due to the anti-clericalism in Rizal's books Noli Me Tángere and El Filibusterismo.

== History ==
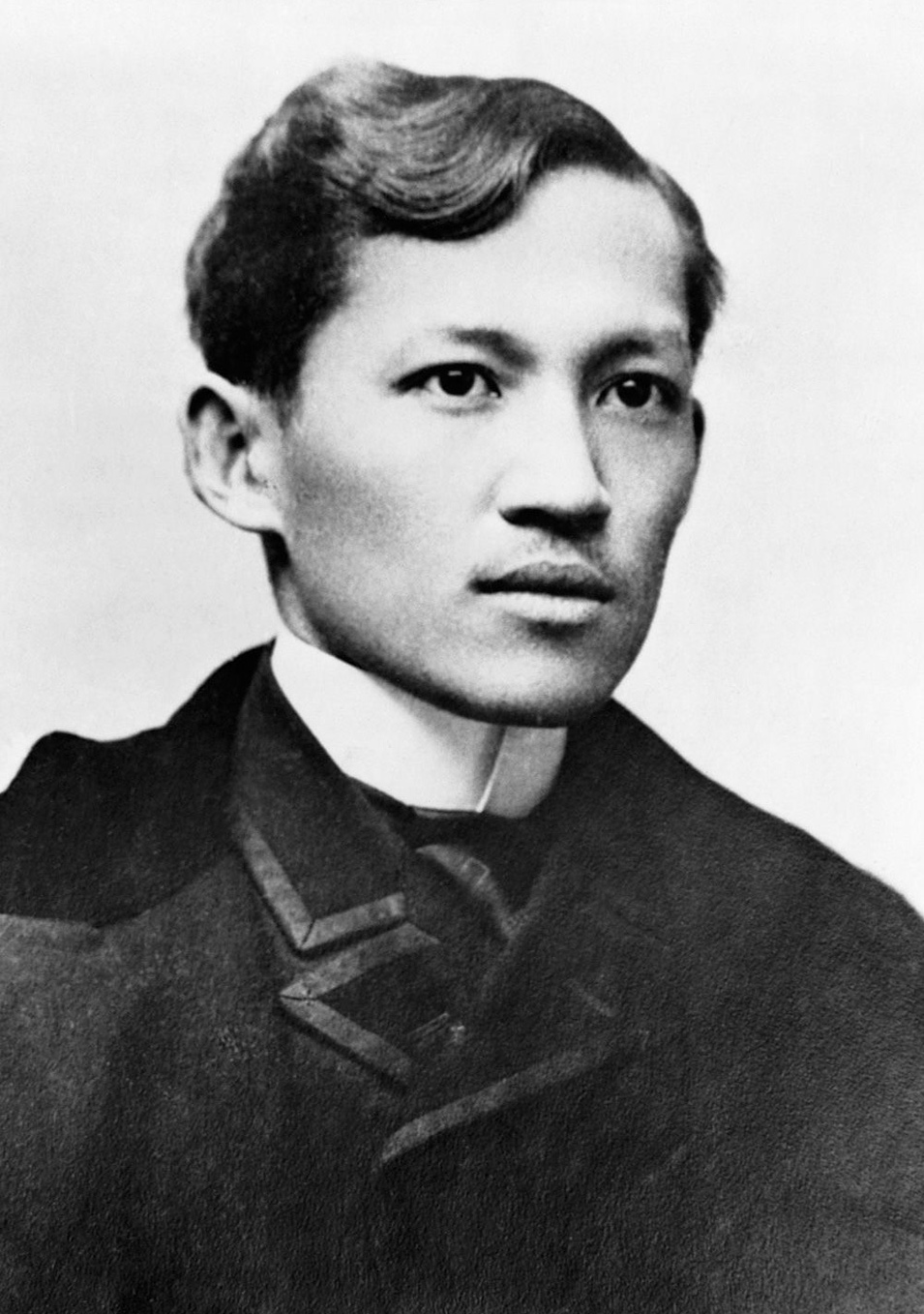
José Rizal

In 1956, the Philippine government passed the “Rizal Law,” requiring that all universities provide mandatory courses on José Rizal and his works. This was opposed by the Catholic Church, which continued to resent its portrayal in Rizal’s novels despite the Filipino clergy’s early association with the nationalist movement. Church leaders accused the bill’s proponent, Senator Recto of being a communist and anti-Catholic. The final bill included a provision allowing Catholic students to refrain from reading Rizal’s works, citing conscientious objections.

In the campaign to oppose the Rizal bill, the Catholic Church urged its adherents to write to their congressmen and senators showing their opposition to the bill; later, it organized symposiums. In one of these symposiums, Fr. Jesus Cavanna argued that the novels belonged to the past and that teaching them would misrepresent current conditions. Radio commentator Jesus Paredes also said that Catholics had the right to refuse to read them as it would "endanger their salvation".

Groups such as Catholic Action of the Philippines, the Congregation of the Mission, the Knights of Columbus, and the Catholic Teachers Guild organized opposition to the bill; they were countered by Veteranos de la Revolucion (Spirit of 1896), Alagad ni Rizal, the Freemasons, and the Knights of Rizal. The Senate Committee on Education sponsored a bill co-written by both Jose P. Laurel and Recto, with the only opposition coming from Francisco Soc Rodrigo, Mariano Jesús Cuenco, and Decoroso Rosales.

The Archbishop of Manila, Rufino Santos, protested in a pastoral letter that Catholic students would be affected if compulsory reading of the unexpurgated version were pushed through. Arsenio Lacson, Manila's mayor, who supported the bill, walked out of Mass when the priest read a circular from the archbishop denouncing the bill.

Rizal, according to Cuenco, "attack[ed] dogmas, beliefs and practices of the Church. The assertion that Rizal limited himself to castigating undeserving priests and refrained from criticizing, ridiculing or putting in doubt dogmas of the Catholic Church, is absolutely gratuitous and misleading." Cuenco touched on Rizal's denial of the existence of purgatory, as it was not found in the Bible, and that Moses and Jesus Christ did not mention its existence; Cuenco concluded that a "majority of the Members of this Chamber, if not all [including] our good friend, the gentleman from Sulu" believed in purgatory. The senator from Sulu, Domocao Alonto, attacked Filipinos who proclaimed Rizal as "their national hero but seemed to despise what he had written", saying that the Indonesians used Rizal's books as their Bible on their independence movement; Pedro López, who hails from Cebu, Cuenco's province, in his support for the bill, reasoned out that it was in their province the independence movement started, when Lapu-Lapu fought Ferdinand Magellan.

Outside the Senate, the Catholic schools threatened to close down if the bill was passed; Recto countered that if that happened, the schools would be nationalized. Recto did not believe the threat, stating that the schools were too profitable to be closed. The schools gave up the threat, but threatened to "punish" legislators in favor of the law in future elections. A compromise was suggested, to use the expurgated version; Recto, who had supported the required reading of the unexpurgated version, declared: "The people who would eliminate the books of Rizal from the schools would blot out from our minds the memory of the national hero. This is not a fight against Recto but a fight against Rizal", adding that since Rizal is dead, they are attempting to suppress his memory. The debate over the bill led to violence in the House of Representatives when pro-Rizal lawmaker Emilio Cortez engaged in a fistfight with Ramon Durano. In Manila, mayor Arsenio Lacson walked out of a reading of a pastoral letter from the Archbishop denouncing the bill, while students burned 3,000 copies of the letter in front of Quiapo Church.

On May 12, 1956, a compromise inserted by Committee on Education chairman Laurel that accommodated the objections of the Catholic Church was approved unanimously. The bill specified that only college (university) students would have the option of reading unexpurgated versions of clerically-contested reading material, such as Noli Me Tángere and El Filibusterismo. The bill was enacted on June 12, 1956, Flag Day.

== Content ==
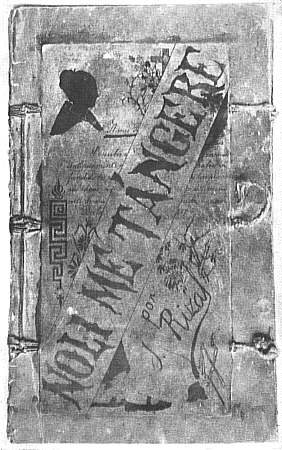
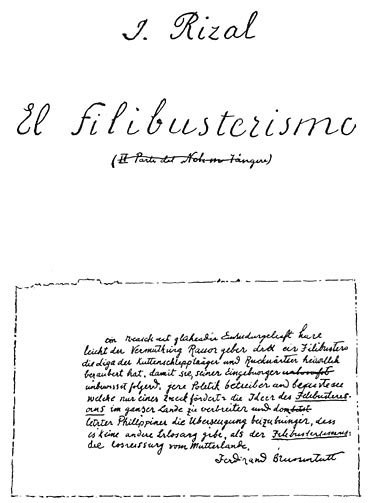
The Noli and Fili were required readings for college students.

Section 2 mandated that the students were to read the novels as they were written in Spanish, although a provision ordered that the Board of National Education create rules on how these should be applied. Republic Act No. 1425 or The Rizal Law is said to have the real intention of instilling the true meaning of nationalism and patriotism in every Filipino, especially the younger generation. It is also said to give learnings needed in facing current societal issues and preserve the contribution of Rizal and other heroes to Philippine independence. The last two sections were focused on making Rizal's works accessible to the general public: the second section mandated the schools to have "an adequate number" of copies in their libraries, while the third ordered the board to publish the works in major Philippine languages.

== Aftermath ==
After the bill was enacted into law, there were no recorded instances of students applying for exemption from reading the novels, and there is no known procedure for such exemptions. In 1994, President Fidel V. Ramos ordered the Department of Education, Culture and Sports to fully implement the law as there had been reports that it has still not been fully implemented.

The debate during the enactment of the Rizal Law has been compared to the Responsible Parenthood and Reproductive Health Act of 2012 (RH Law) debate in 2011. Akbayan representative Kaka Bag-ao, one of the proponents of the RH Law, said, quoting the Catholic hierarchy, that "More than 50 years ago, they said the Rizal Law violates the Catholic's right to conscience and religion, interestingly, the same line of reasoning they use to oppose the RH bill."

In 2026, the Commission on Higher Education proposed to cull general education (minor) subjects, including but not limited to merging the Rizal studies subject with Philippine history and humanities subjects; faculty members opposed such measures. With the opposition to the proposal, the commission decided to postpone the changes to 2028.
