= Máximo Viola =

Filipino doctor, writer, and revolutionary (1857–1933)

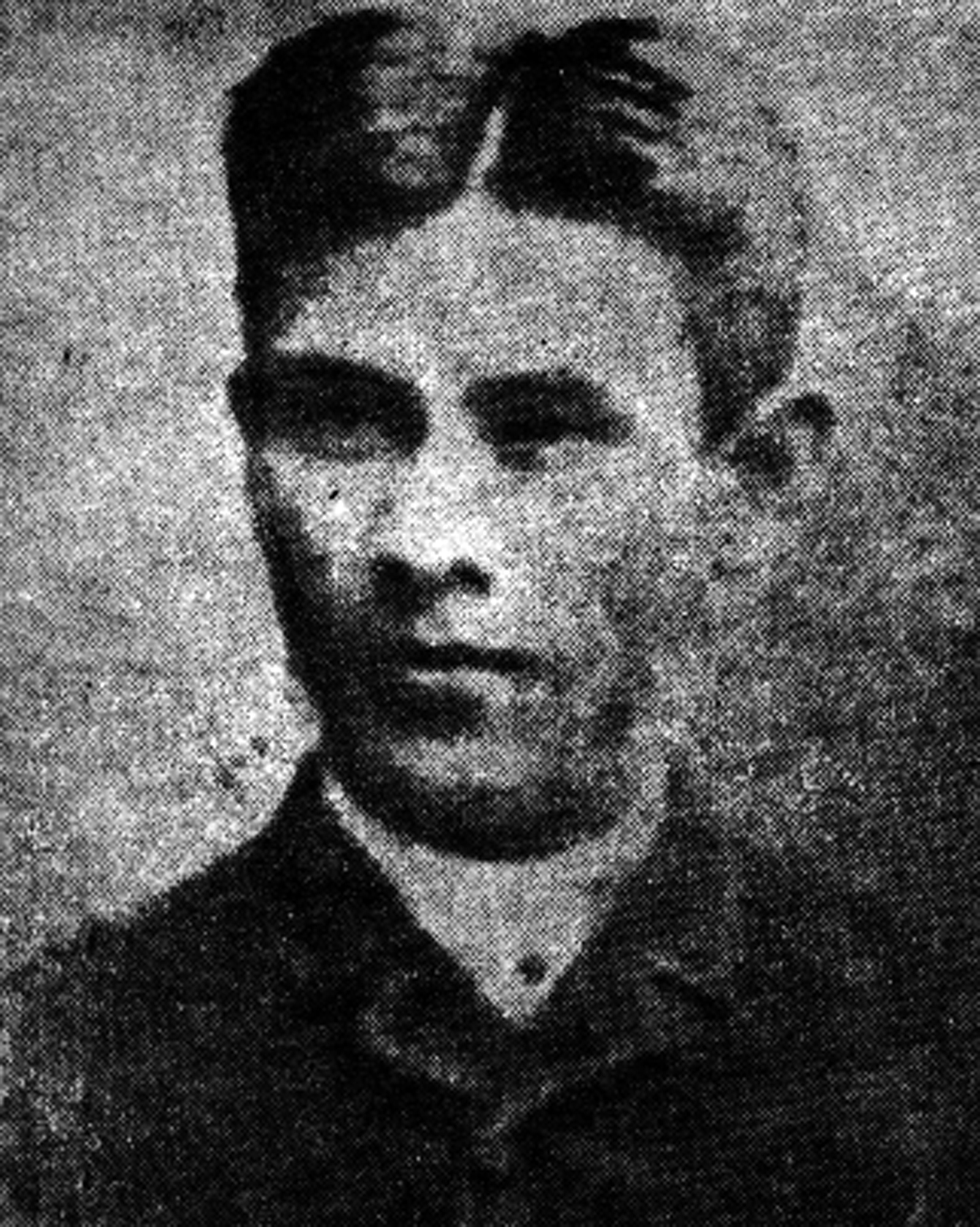
- Born: Máximo Viola y Sison; 17 October 1857; Santa Rita, San Miguel, Bulacan, Captaincy General of the Philippines
- Died: 3 September 1933 (aged 75); San Jose, San Miguel, Bulacan, Philippine Islands
- Education: University of Santo Tomas; University of Barcelona
- Spouse: Juana Roura
- Children: 5

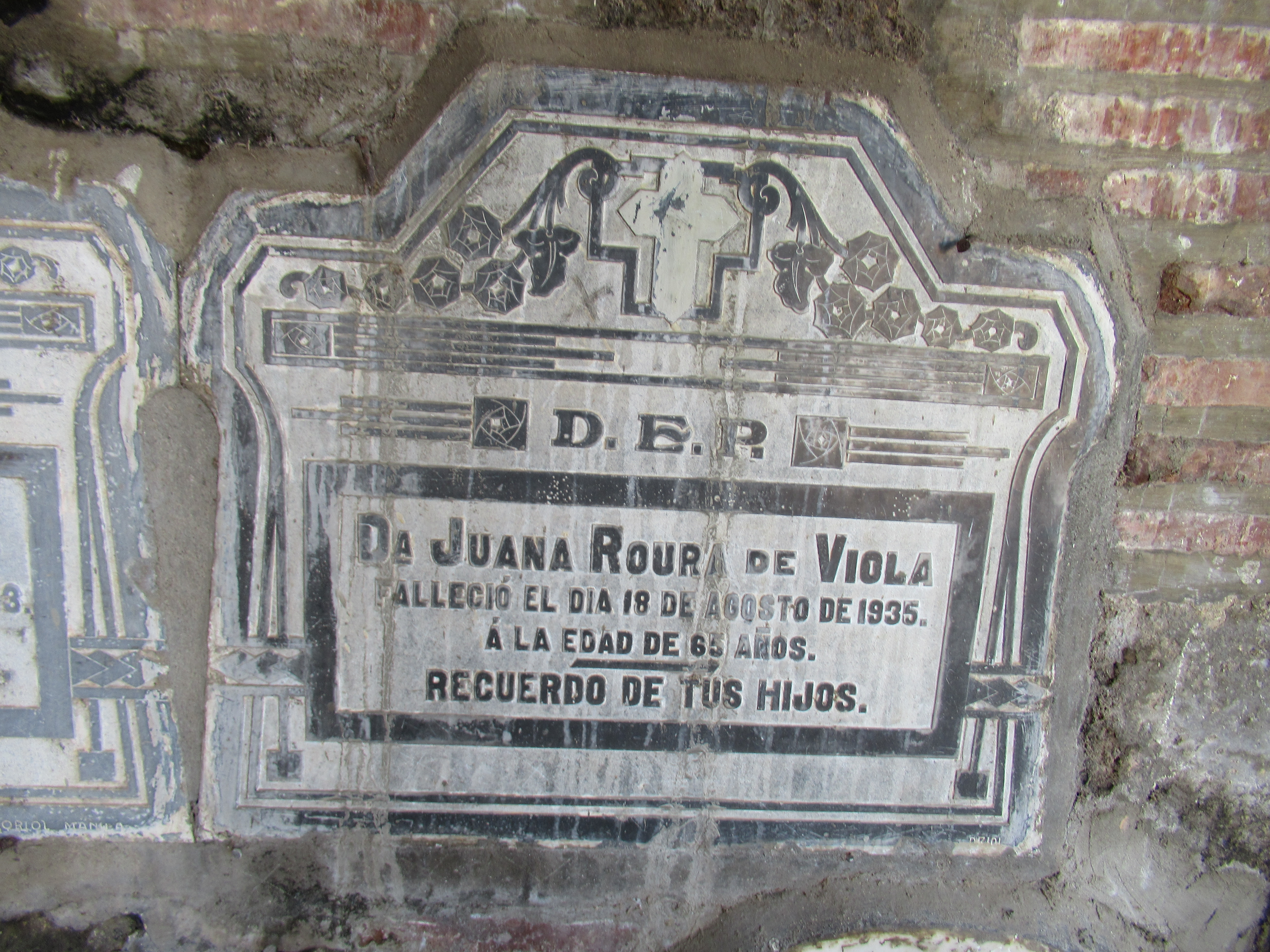
Juana Roura's tomb

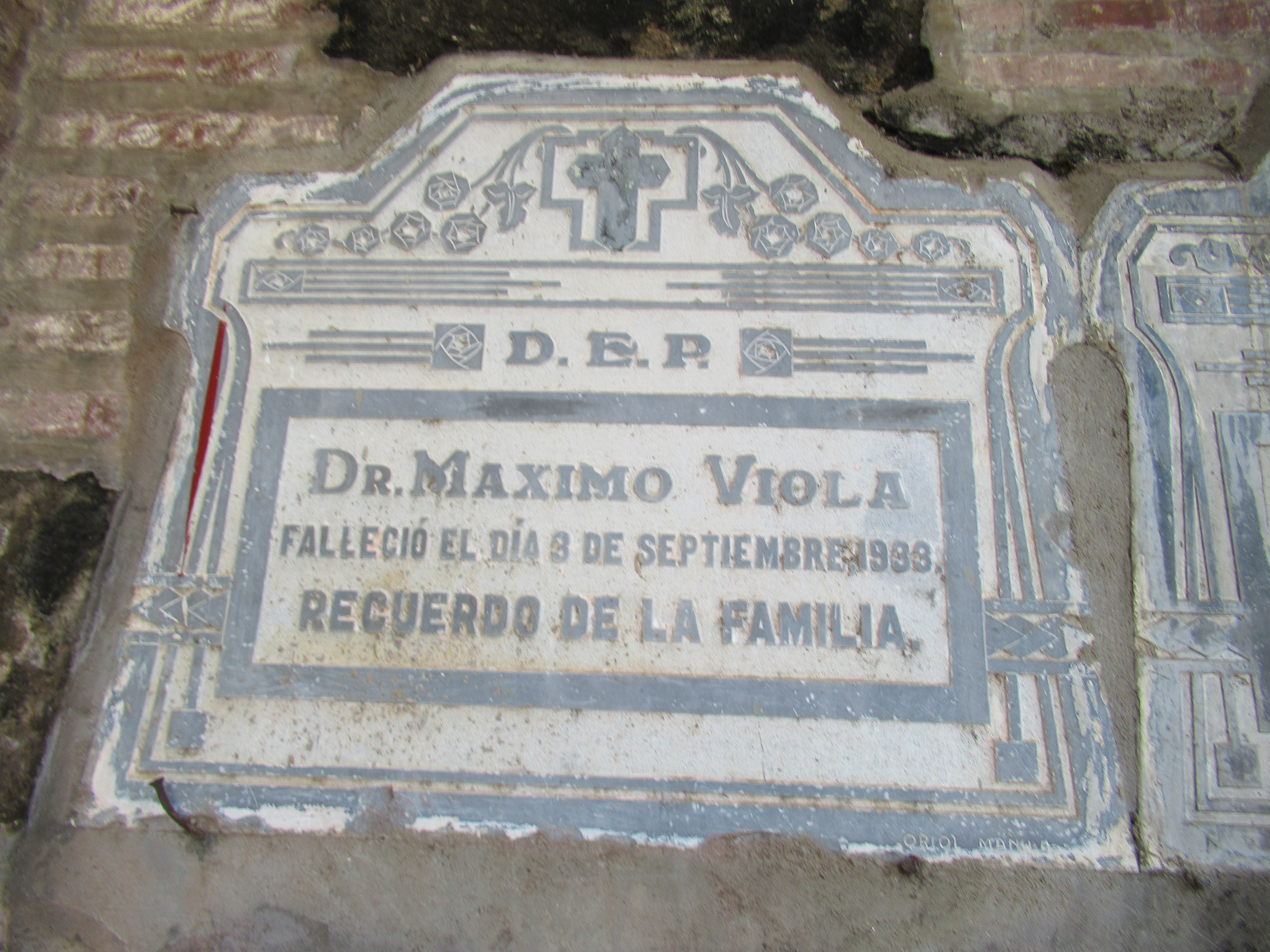
Viola's tomb

Máximo Viola y Sison (17 October 1857 – 3 September 1933) was a propagandist, writer, revolutionary leader and doctor from Bulacan, Philippines.

He is known as the best friend of Jose Rizal in Europe. They work together, they visited museums, art gallery, restaurants and stayed in hotels to work there in Europe. He led a fight against the Spaniards with his two brothers and stayed at Biak-na-Bato. He was also one of the leaders of the Propaganda Movement. He also financed the publication of Rizal's novel Noli Me Tangere. He studied medicine at the University of Santo Tomas and in 1882 he went to Spain to continue his studies. He finished his course in the year 1886.

== Early life and education ==
Viola was born on 17 October 1857 in Santa Rita, San Miguel, Bulacan to Pedro Viola and Isabel Sison. He finished his premed studies at the University of Santo Tomas and later went to Spain to attend the University of Barcelona where he obtained a degree in medicine in 1882.

== Meeting with Jose Rizal ==
Viola met Jose Rizal, in Barcelona, Spain and both became involved in the Propaganda Movement. He traveled across Europe particularly to Germany, Austria-Hungary, and Switzerland, from May to June 1887 upon the later's invitation.

Rizal experienced financial constraints in getting his novel Noli me Tangere published and considered destroying the manuscript of the book. Viola financed the publication of the first 2000 copies of the novel in 1887, and was later given the galley proof and the first published copy of the novel by Rizal.

== Return to the Philippines ==
In 1887, Viola returned to the Philippines to practice his profession as a doctor. He had a brief meeting with Rizal in Manila in late June 1892. Both were suspected to have links with the secessionist movement. Spanish colonial authorities remained suspicious of Viola until the Philippine Revolution. With his two brothers, he stayed in Biak-na-Bato during the revolution against Spanish colonial authorities.

He was put to a military prison in Manila by the American colonial authorities during the early period of American administration over the Philippines. He was later transferred to Olongapo/ Viola was freed by an American doctor, Dr. Fresnell who asked for Viola's assistance since Fresnell has lack of knowledge on tropical diseases.

== Later life ==
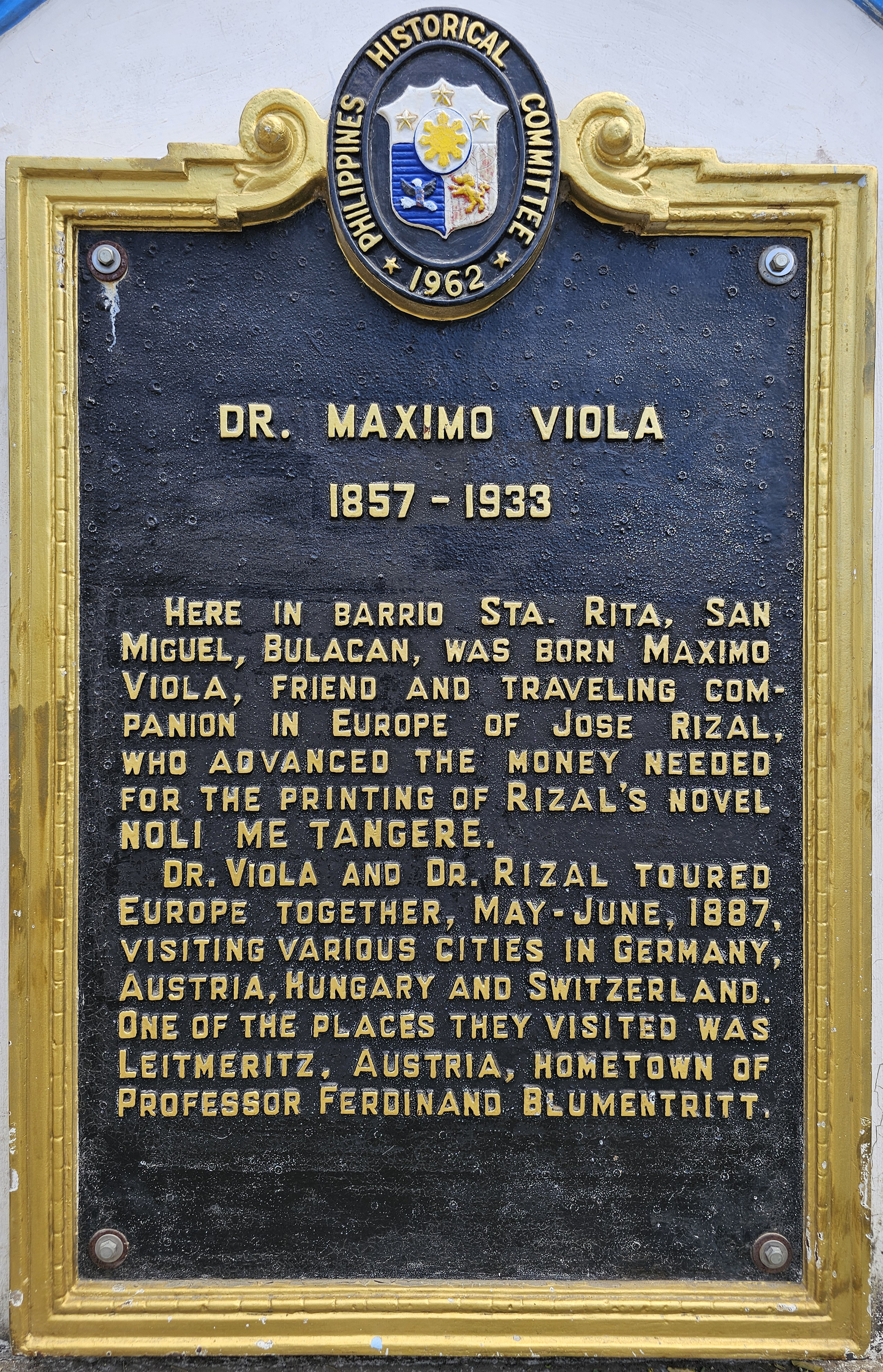
NHI Marker, Salangan, San Miguel, Bulacan

Viola became the president of Liga de Proprietarios to support the rice farmers of San Miguel, Bulacan in their opposition against politicians who were courting the tenants' votes at the expense of the landlords. During the extension of the Manila Railroad line to Cabanatuan, Nueva Ecija, he opposed the acquisition of land by the British Company without the latter paying appropriate reparations to the landowners affected. Viola also treated indigents at no cost as a doctor.

He was also engaged in making furniture from Kamagong in his later years. Viola was given an award for an exposition in Manila in 1920.

Viola died in the barrio of San Jose in San Miguel, Bulacan on 3 September 1933 due to cancer. Roura died on 18 August 1935 at the age of 65. They were buried at San Miguel Church tombs.

== Personal life ==
Upon Viola's return to the Philippines from Europe, he met Juana Roura, whom he married in 1890. They had five sons but two of them died as infants.
