= Cédula =

Cédula may refer to:

- Cédula de identidad, a national identity document in many Latin American countries
- Real cédula, a historical form of dispatch from the King of Spain
- Sedula, a legal identity document in the Philippines which is issued to all persons upon payment of community tax
