= Noli Me Tángere (novel) =

Novel by José Rizal

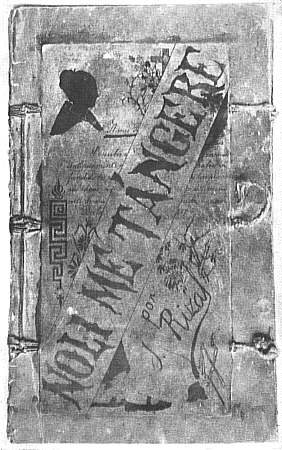
- The original front cover of the book manuscript
- Author: José Rizal
- Language: Spanish
- Genre: Novel, satire, Philippine history
- Publisher: Berliner Buchdruckerei-Aktiengesellschaft, Berlin, German Empire
- Publication date: 1887
- Publication place: Captaincy General of the Philippines, Spanish Empire
- Media type: Print (hardcover)
- Followed by: El filibusterismo
- Text: Noli Me Tángere at Wikisource

Noli Me Tángere (Note: Early English translations of the novel used different titles, such as An Eagle Flight, The Social Cancer, and The Lost Eden, but more recent English translations use the original title.) (Latin for "Touch Me Not") is a novel by Filipino writer and activist José Rizal and was published during the Spanish colonial period of the Philippines. It explores inequities in law and practice in terms of the treatment by the ruling government and the Spanish Catholic friars of the resident peoples in the late 19th century.

Originally written by Rizal in Spanish, the book has since been more commonly published and read in the Philippines in either Tagalog (the major indigenous language), or English. The Rizal Law requires Noli, published in 1887, and its 1891 sequel, El filibusterismo, to be read by all high school students throughout the country. Noli is studied in Grade 9 and El filibusterismo in Grade 10. The two novels are widely considered to be the national epic of the Philippines. They have been adapted in many forms, such as operas, musicals, plays, and other forms of art.

== Background ==
José Rizal, a Filipino nationalist and polymath, conceived the idea of writing a novel that would expose the backwardness and lack of progress of Philippine society because of the burden of colonization. According to historian Carlos Quirino, the novel bears similarities in terms of characterization and plot to the Spanish novelist Benito Pérez Galdós' "Doña Perfecta". Rizal intended to express the way Filipino culture was perceived to be backward, anti-progress, anti-intellectual, and not conducive to the ideals of the Age of Enlightenment. At the time, he was a student of medicine at the Universidad Central de Madrid.

Other Filipinos were also working or studying in Madrid which, as the capital of Spain, was the center of culture and universities. At a gathering on January 2, 1884, of friends at the house of Pedro A. Paterno, Rizal proposed that a group of Filipinos should collaborate on a novel about the Philippines. His proposal was unanimously approved by those present, among whom were Pedro, Máximo Viola and Antonio Paterno, Graciano López Jaena, Evaristo Aguirre, Eduardo de Lete, Julio Llorente, and Valentin Ventura. However, they never got into the project. Although agreeing to help, none of the others wrote anything. Initially, Rizal planned for the novel to encompass all phases of Filipino life, but most of his friends, all young males, wanted to write about women. Rizal saw that his companions spent more time gambling and flirting with Spanish women than writing. Because of this, he decided to draft the novel alone.

=== Etymology ===
The title, Noli me tangere, originates from John 20:17 as purportedly spoken by Jesus to Mary Magdalene following his resurrection. In Rizal's time, it also referred to cancers that occurred on the face, particularly cancers of the eyelid; touching such lesions irritated them, causing pain. As an ophthalmologist, Rizal was familiar with the cancer and the name. He is explicit about the connection in the novel's dedication, which begins: A mi patria ('To my country') and continues with "...a cancer of so malignant a character that the least touch irritates it and awakens in it the sharpest pains." (Note: The full dedication of Noli Me Tángere appeared in an early English translation as: To my fatherland [alternatively, "To my country"]: Recorded in the history of human sufferings is a cancer of so malignant a character that the least touch irritates it and awakens in it the sharpest pains. Thus, how many times, when in the midst of modern civilizations I have wished to call thee before me, now to accompany me in memories, now to compare thee with other countries, hath thy dear image presented itself showing a social cancer like to that other! Desiring thy welfare, which is our own, and seeking the best treatment, I will do with thee what the ancients did with their sick, exposing them on the steps of the temple so that every one who came to invoke the Divinity might offer them a remedy. And to this end, I will strive to reproduce thy condition faithfully, without discriminations; I will raise a part of the veil that covers the evil, sacrificing to truth everything, even vanity itself, since, as thy son, I am conscious that I also suffer from thy defects and weaknesses. The Author, Europe, 1886 — José Rizal; Translated from the Spanish by Charles Derbyshire, 1912 English edition, Noli Me Tángere (1887)) Rizal probes the cancers of Filipino society.

== Plot ==
Crisóstomo Ibarra, the mestizo son of the recently deceased Don Rafael Ibarra, returns to San Diego in Laguna after seven years studying in Europe. At a reunion in Manila hosted by family friend Kapitán Tiago, Crisóstomo encounters Padre Dámaso Verdolagas, the former San Diego parish priest, who treats him with unexpected hostility. Lieutenant Guevara, another friend of Don Rafael, later warns Crisóstomo that his father may have been killed for political reasons and that Dámaso may have been involved.

The next day, Crisóstomo visits María Clara, Tiago's daughter and his childhood sweetheart. Before leaving for San Diego, he reminisces with her about their past and their hopes for the country.

In San Diego, Crisóstomo discovers that his father's grave has been desecrated. A gravedigger explains that Dámaso ordered Don Rafael's remains transferred to the Chinese cemetery, but he instead threw the body into the lake out of fear and pity. Crisóstomo confronts the new parish priest, Padre Bernardo Salví, who reveals that Dámaso gave the order. Crisóstomo forgives the priests and resolves to improve the town. Believing his paisanos need better education than that provided by government schools influenced by the friars, he plans a private school. With support from local residents and Spanish authorities, and with advice from Don Anastacio and a progressive schoolmaster, the project quickly advances.

During a picnic at the Laguna de Baý, Crisóstomo and his companions encounter a crocodile in the Ibarras' fish pens. Crisóstomo and the boatman Elías subdue it together, and Elías becomes indebted to him. On the day of the town fiesta, Elías warns Crisóstomo that someone plans to kill him during the cornerstone-laying ceremony. The attack fails, killing the would-be assassin instead. At the ensuing luncheon, Dámaso publicly insults Crisóstomo and Don Rafael. Enraged, Crisóstomo attacks him and threatens him with a knife, but releases him when María Clara pleads for mercy. Crisóstomo is excommunicated, though the sympathetic Captain-General later has the excommunication lifted. When Crisóstomo returns to San Diego, however, María is ill and refuses to see him.

Elías, recognizing Crisóstomo's influence with the government, privately tells him that a revolutionary group has tried to recruit him. He also recounts his family's history: his grandfather, a Manila bookkeeper, was falsely accused of arson by his Spanish employer, and the resulting prosecution and social ostracism destroyed his family. Crisóstomo says he cannot help because his school is his priority, prompting Elías to distance himself from him. Days later, however, Elías warns Crisóstomo that a planned uprising is a trap: its organizers have falsely invoked Crisóstomo's name, while the authorities already know of the plot and intend to spring a trap on the rebels. Crisóstomo abandons his school project and asks Elías to destroy documents that could implicate him. Elías discovers the name Don Pedro Eibarramendia, the ancestor of Crisóstomo's family and the same Spaniard who accused his grandfather. Horrified, Elías leaves.

The uprising occurs, and many rebels are captured or killed after identifying Crisóstomo as their supposed leader. He is arrested. The conspirators are subsequently found dead because Salví, who masterminded the plot, ordered them killed to silence them. Elías secretly returns to the Ibarra mansion, destroys incriminating documents and valuables, and burns the house. Crisóstomo and his fellow prisoners are taken to jail amid the townspeople's hostility.

In Manila, Tiago hosts a dinner celebrating María Clara's engagement to Alfonso Linares, a peninsular Spaniard whom she was expected to marry after Crisóstomo's excommunication. Among the guests are Salví, Padre Sibyla, and Lieutenant Guevara. Guevara explains that Crisóstomo was convicted because an enemy copied the handwriting and signature from a letter he had written before leaving for Europe, using them to fabricate recruitment letters for the uprising. Crisóstomo could have disproved the accusation by denying the signature on his original letter, but upon recognizing it as his farewell letter to María Clara, he loses the will to defend himself and is sentenced to deported. Guevara privately congratulates María for surrendering the letter, believing she has secured her own peaceful future, but she is devastated.

Crisóstomo escapes prison with Elías's help and secretly confronts María. She admits surrendering his letter because Salví discovered letters from her pregnant mother to Dámaso requesting an abortion, revealing that Dámaso is María's biological father. Salví blackmailed her with the letters and demanded Crisóstomo's farewell letter in exchange for concealing the secret. Crisóstomo forgives María, and they part after reaffirming their love.

Crisóstomo and Elías flee through the Estero de Binondo and the Pasig River. Elías reveals that his family's treasure is buried in the Ibarra forest and urges Crisóstomo to flee abroad with him. Crisóstomo refuses, however, because he remains committed to reforming the country. Crisóstomo then reveals that he has come to favor revolution, even beyond what Elías is willing to pursue. Pursued by sentries across Laguna de Bay, they separate: Elías jumps into the water to distract the soldiers and is shot repeatedly, while Crisóstomo escapes.

The next day, María reads that Crisóstomo was killed. She demands that Dámaso cancel her marriage and allow her to enter the convent. Dámaso admits that he deliberately ruined Crisóstomo because he was a mestizo and Dámaso wanted María to marry a peninsular Spaniard who could provide security. Knowing the danger posed by Salví's presence at the convent, Dámaso begs María to reconsider, but she refuses. He reluctantly consents, believing convent life preferable to her suicide.

Meanwhile, Basilio pursues his mentally broken mother, Sisa, through the Ibarra forest. Driven insane by her husband's abuse, the death of her younger son at Salví's hands, and the loss of Basilio to the Guardia Civil, Sisa dies in Basilio's arms inside the Ibarra mausoleum. Elías, mortally wounded, reaches them and asks Basilio to cremate their bodies and, if no one comes, search the mausoleum for treasure to fund his education. Before Basilio leaves for wood, Elías dies, lamenting that he will not live to see freedom and urging those who do to welcome it and remember those who died in darkness.

Afterward, Dámaso is transferred to a remote town and dies in despair. Tiago becomes depressed, addicted to opium, and forgotten. Salví, awaiting consecration as a bishop, serves as chaplain to the Convent of the Poor Clares. During a storm, patrolmen report seeing a specter on the convent roof. The next day, a nun with a wet and torn gown tells a government representative of "tales of horror" and begs for "protection against the outrages of hypocrisy". The abbess declares the nun insane, and subsequent attempts to investigate are blocked. Nothing further is revealed about the nun or María Clara.

== Publication history ==
Rizal finished the novel in March 1887. At first, according to one of Rizal's biographers, Rizal feared the novel might not be printed, and that it would remain unread. He was struggling with financial constraints at the time and thought it would be hard to pursue printing the novel.

His friend Máximo Viola provided some financial aid, enabling Rizal to have the book printed at Berliner Buchdruckerei-Aktiengesellschaft in Berlin. Viola loaned Rizal ₱300 for 2,000 copies. The printing was finished earlier than the estimated five months. Viola arrived in Berlin in December 1886, and by March 21, 1887, Rizal had sent a copy of the novel to his friend, Ferdinand Blumentritt.

Spanish authorities in the Philippines banned the book, but copies were smuggled into the country. The first Philippine edition (and the second published edition) was printed in 1899 in Manila by Chofre y Compania in Escolta.

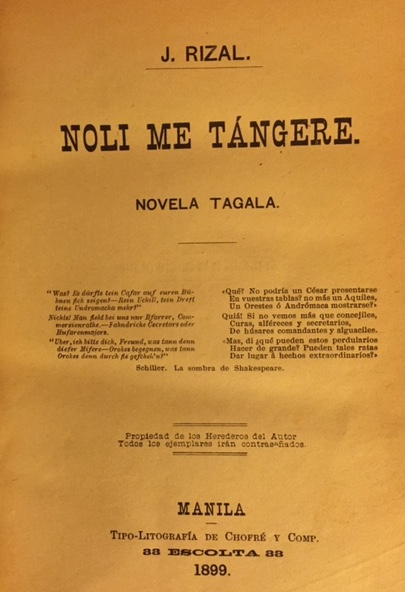
Cover page of the first Philippine edition published in 1899

Local English translations of Noli Me Tangere and El filibusterismo being sold at National Book Store in the Philippines

=== Recent English editions ===
On August 21, 2007, a 480-page English-language version of Noli Me Tángere was released to major Australian book stores. Penguin Classics (an imprint by Penguin Books) published this edition in keeping with its "commitment to publish the major literary classics of the world."

American writer Harold Augenbraum, who first read Noli in 1992, had translated the novel. A writer well-acquainted with translating other Spanish-language literary works, Augenbraum proposed to translate the novel. Penguin changed their initial plan of adapting existing English versions and instead commissioned him to make a new translation. León Guerrero, a Filipino consular officer in London, made a translated version of the book published under the name of The Lost Eden, though its edition has faced criticism by Harold Augenbraum by stating that it omitted passages that made fun of the Filipino bourgeoisie. Ma. Soledad Lacson-Locsin translated the book in her eighties before Bookmark, Inc., of Manila published it in hardcover in 1995, referring to the original facsimiles. Her edition, however, faced criticism, with Harold Augenbraum stating that "[the book's] syntax is muddled, its grammar questionable, and its style wooden"; the review also stated that "the text ends up riddled with mis-takes and confusion" by misinterpreting events.

== Reaction and legacy ==
This novel and its sequel, El filibusterismo (nicknamed El fili), were banned by Spanish authorities in the Philippines because of their allegations of corruption and abuse by the colonial government and the Catholic Church. Copies of the book were nevertheless smuggled in and hidden, and when Rizal returned to the Philippines after completing medical studies, he quickly ran afoul of the local government. A few days after his arrival, Rizal was summoned to Malacañan Palace by Governor-General Emilio Terrero, who told him of the charge that Noli Me Tángere contained subversive elements. After a discussion, Terrero was appeased but still unable to offer resistance to pressure from the Church against the book. The persecution can be discerned from Rizal's letter to Ferdinand Blumentritt:

My book made a lot of noise; everywhere, I am asked about it. They wanted to anathematize me ['to excommunicate me'] because of it... I am considered a German spy, an agent of Bismarck, they say I am a Protestant, a freemason, a sorcerer, a damned soul and evil. It is whispered that I want to draw plans, that I have a foreign passport and that I wander through the streets by night...

Rizal was exiled to Dapitan in the province of Zamboanga in the Western Mindanao region of the country, then later arrested for "inciting rebellion" based largely on his writings. Rizal was executed by firing squad at Bagumbayan outside Manila's walls on December 30, 1896, at the age of thirty-five, at the park that now bears his name.

=== Influence on Filipino nationalism ===
Rizal depicted nationality by emphasizing the positive qualities of Filipinos: the devotion of a Filipina and her influence on a man's life, the deep sense of gratitude, and the solid common sense of the Filipinos under the Spanish regime.

The work was instrumental in creating a unified Filipino national identity and consciousness, as many natives previously identified with their respective regions. It lampooned, caricatured and exposed various elements in colonial society. Two characters in particular have become classics in Filipino culture: María Clara, who has become a personification of the ideal Filipino woman, loving and unwavering in her loyalty to her spouse; and the priest Father Dámaso, who reflects the covert fathering of illegitimate children by members of the Spanish clergy.

The book indirectly influenced the Philippine Revolution of independence from the Spanish Empire, even though Rizal actually advocated direct representation to the Spanish government and an overall larger role for the Philippines within Spain's political affairs. In 1956, Congress passed Republic Act 1425, more popularly known as the Rizal Law, which requires all levels in Philippine schools to teach the novel as part of their curriculum. Noli Me Tángere is being taught to third-year secondary school (now Grade 9, due to the new K-12 curriculum) students, while its sequel El Filibusterismo is being taught for fourth-year secondary school (now Grade 10) students. The novels are incorporated to their study and survey of Philippine literature. Both of Rizal's novels were initially banned from Catholic educational institutions given its negative portrayal of the Church, but this taboo has been largely superseded as religious schools conformed to the Rizal Law.

== Major characters ==
=== Crisóstomo Ibarra ===
Don Juan Crisóstomo Eibarramendia y Magsalin, commonly referred to in the novel as Ibarra or Crisóstomo, is the novel's protagonist. The mestizo (mixed-race) son of Filipino businessman Don Rafael Ibarra, he studied in Europe for seven years. Ibarra is also María Clara's fiancé.

=== María Clara ===
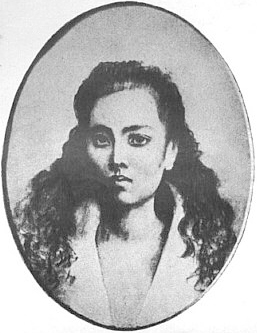
A crayon sketch of Leonor Rivera-Kipping by Rizal. Rivera, who was Rizal's longtime love interest, is the commonly accepted basis for the María Clara character.

María Clara de los Santos y Alba, commonly referred to as María Clara, María, or Clarita, is Ibarra's fiancée and the most beautiful and widely celebrated girl in San Diego. She was raised by Kapitán Tiago de los Santos, and his cousin, Isabel. In the later parts of the novel, she was revealed to be an illegitimate daughter of Father Dámaso, the former curate of the town, and Doña Pía Alba, Kapitán Tiago's wife, who had died giving birth to María Clara.

At the novel's end, a heartbroken yet resolved María Clara entered the Real Monasterio de Santa Clara (a Poor Clare nunnery) after learning the truth of her parentage and mistakenly believing that her lover, Crisóstomo, had been killed. In the epilogue, Rizal stated that it is unknown whether María Clara is still living within the walls of the convent or is already dead.

=== Kapitán Tiyago ===
Don Santiago de los Santos, known by his nickname Tiyago and political title Kapitán Tiyago, is said to be the richest man in the region of Binondo and possessed real properties in Pampanga and Laguna de Baý. He is also said to be a good Catholic, a friend of the Spanish government and thus was considered a Spaniard by the colonial elite. Kapitán Tiyago never attended school, so he became the domestic helper of a Dominican friar who gave him an informal education. He later married Pía Alba from Santa Cruz. In Lacson-Locsin's translation, his name is spelled as Capitan Tiago.

=== Padre Dámaso ===
Dámaso Verdolagas, better known as Padre Dámaso, is a Franciscan friar and the former parish curate of San Diego. He is notorious for his brashness and cruelty during his ministry in the town. An enemy of Crisóstomo's father Don Rafael Ibarra, Dámaso is revealed to be María Clara's biological father. Later, he and María Clara had bitter arguments on whether she would marry Alfonso Linares de Espadaña (which he preferred) or enter the nunnery (her desperate alternative). At the end of the novel, he is again reassigned to a distant town and later found dead in his bed.

=== Elías ===
Elías is Ibarra's mysterious friend and ally. Elías made his first appearance as an oarsman during a picnic of Ibarra and María Clara and her friends.

Chapter 50 explores Elías' family history. Elías's grandfather Ingkong, in his youth, worked as a bookkeeper in a Manila office. One night the office burned down, and Don Pedro Eibarramendia, the Spaniard owner, accused him of arson. Ingkong was imprisoned and upon release was shunned by the community as a dangerous lawbreaker. His wife Impong turned to prostitution to support themselves but eventually they were driven into the hinterlands. There Impong bore her first son, Balat.

Driven to depression, Ingkong hangs himself deep in the forest. Impong was sickly for lack of nourishment in the forest and was not strong enough to cut down his corpse and bury him, and Balat was then still very young. The stench led to their discovery, and Impong was accused of killing her husband. She and her son fled to another province where she bore another son.

Balat grew up to be a legendary bandit. When he was finally caught he was cut limb by limb and his head was deposited in front of Impong's house. Seeing the severed head of her son, Impong died of shock. Impong's younger son, knowing their deaths would somehow be imputed upon him, fled to the province of Tayabas where he met and fell in love with a rich young heiress. They have an affair and the lady got pregnant.

But before they could marry, his records were dug up. Then the father, who disapproved of him from the start, had him imprisoned. The lady gave birth to Elías and his twin sister but died while the two were still children. Nonetheless, the twins were well cared for and doted over by their grandfather. Elías went to Ateneo and his sister to La Concordia, but as they wanted to become farmers they eventually returned to Tayabas.

He and his sister grew up not knowing about their father except that he had died long ago. Elías was an abusive brat who took particular joy in berating an elderly servant who, nevertheless, always submitted to his whims. His sister was more refined and eventually was betrothed to a fine young man. But before they could marry, Elías ran afoul with a distant relative. The verbal scuffle mounted to the point where records were dug up, and Elías and his sister, as well as a good part of town, learned the truth. The elderly servant whom Elías frequently abused was their father.

The scandal caused the engagement of Elías' sister to break off. Depressed, the girl disappeared one day and was eventually found dead along the seashore. Elías himself lost face and became a wanderer. Like his uncle Balat, he became a bandit, but by degrees he became the gentler, more reserved, and more noble character first introduced in the novel.

=== Pilósopo Tasyo ===
Also known as Don Anastasio, he was a former student of philosophy. His wealthy mother, not wanting him to forget God, presented him with the choice of entering the priesthood or leaving college. He leaves college, marries his sweetheart, but loses her and his mother in the same year. To ensure he does not fall into depression or vice, he devotes his time on his books and in so doing neglects the wealth his mother left for him. He writes using an invented form of alphabet that is based on the Tagalog language, hoping that the future generations may be able to decipher it. In Lacson-Locsin's translation, his name is spelled as Tasio.

=== Doña Victorina ===
Doña Victorina de los Reyes de Espadaña, commonly known as Doña Victorina, is an ambitious Filipina who classifies herself as a Spaniard and mimics Spanish ladies by putting on heavy makeup. The novel narrates Doña Victorina's younger days: she had many admirers, but she spurned them all because none of them were Spaniards. Later on, she met and married Don Tiburcio de Espadaña, an official of the customs bureau ten years her junior. However, their marriage is childless.

Her husband assumes the title of medical "doctor" even though he never attended medical school; using fake documents and certificates, Tiburcio illegally practices medicine. Tiburcio's usage of the title Dr. consequently makes Victorina assume the title Dra. (doctora, female doctor). Apparently, she uses the whole name Doña Victorina de los Reyes de de Espadaña, with double de to emphasize her marital name. She seems to feel that this awkward titling makes her more "sophisticated."

=== Sisa, Crispín, and Basilio ===
Sisa, Crispín, and Basilio represent a Filipino family persecuted by the Spanish authorities:

- Narcisa, or Sisa, is the deranged mother of Basilio and Crispín. Described as beautiful and young, she loves her children very much but cannot protect them from beatings by her husband, Pedro.
- Crispín is Sisa's seven-year-old son. An altar boy, he was unjustly accused of stealing money from the church. The head sexton beats the boy to force him to "return" the money. Basilio dreams that Crispín dies of the beating.
- Basilio is Sisa's 10-year-old son. An acolyte tasked with ringing the church's bells for the Angelus, he faced the dread of Crispín's death and his mother's descent into insanity. Elías asked him to cremate his and Sisa's body after revealing the location of Ibarra's treasure. As a young man, he plays a major role in the sequel, El filibusterismo.

Due to their tragic but endearing story, these characters are often parodied in modern Filipino popular culture.

- Salomé is Elías' sweetheart. She lived in a little house by the lake, and though Elías would like to marry her, he tells her that it would do her or their children no good to be related to a fugitive like himself. In the original publication of Noli Me Tángere, the chapter that explores the identity of Elías and Salomé was omitted, classifying her as a totally non-existent character. This chapter, titled Elías y Salomé, was probably the 25th chapter of the novel. However, recent editions and translations of Noli include this chapter either on the appendix or as Chapter X (Ex), and Lacson-Locsin's translation fully restores the chapter into the main story.

== Other characters ==
There are several secondary and minor characters in Noli Me Tángere. Names indicated in parentheses are the standard Tagalog version of Spanish names in the novel.

- Padre Hernándo de la Sibyla – a short and fair-skinned Dominican friar. He is instructed by an old priest in his order to observe and see Crisóstomo Ibarra's doings.
- Padre Bernardo Salví – a Franciscan friar who succeeded Damaso as curate of San Diego. He lusts after María Clara. He is described to be very thin and sickly. It is also hinted that his surname, "Salví", is the shorter form of "salvación" ("salvation"), or that "Salví" is short for "salvaje" ("savage", "wild"), hinting at the fact that he is willing to kill an innocent child, Crispín, whom he accused of stealing money worth two onzas.
- El Alférez – the unnamed chief of the local Guardia Civil and husband of Doña Consolación. He is the sworn enemy of the priests in the town's power struggle.
- Doña Consolación – wife of the Alférez, nicknamed as la musa de los guardias civiles ("the muse of the Civil Guard") or la Alféreza. She was a former laundrywoman who passes herself as a peninsular, and is best remembered for her abusive treatment of Sisa.
- Don Tiburcio de Espadaña – A Spanish quack doctor who is weak and submissive to his pretentious wife, Doña Victorina.
- Teniente Guevara – lieutenant of the Guardia Civil, a close friend of Don Rafael Ibarra. He reveals to Crisóstomo the circumstances of Don Rafael's death.
- Alfonso Linares – A distant nephew of Tiburcio de Espadaña who would later become the fiancé of María Clara. Although he presented himself as a practitioner of law, it was later revealed that he is, like Don Tiburcio, a fraud. He later died from medications Don Tiburcio had given him.
- Tíya Isabel – Kapitán Tiago's cousin, who helped raise María Clara and served as a surrogate mother figure.
- Capitan-General – Unnamed in the novel, he is the most powerful colonial official in the Philippines. He harbors great disdain for the friars and corrupt officials, and sympathizes with Ibarra.
- Don Filipo Lino – vice-mayor of the town of San Diego, leader of the liberals.
- Padre Manuel Martín – he is the linguist curate of a nearby town who delivers the sermon during San Diego's fiesta.
- Don Rafael Ibarra – Crisóstomo Ibarra's father. Though he was the richest man in San Diego, he was also the most virtuous and generous. Thus he stepped on the toes of the elite who then conspired to destroy him.
- Doña Pía Alba – wife of Kapitán Tiago and mother of María Clara; she died giving birth to her daughter. Kapitán Tiago was officially the child's father, but in reality, Alba was raped by Padre Dámaso.
- Don Pedro Eibarramendia – Crisóstomo Ibarra's Basque great-grandfather who falsely accused Elías's grandfather and ruined his family. The surname was later shortened to Ibarra.
- Albino – a seminarian who follows Crisóstomo Ibarra in a picnic with María Clara's friends.
- Don Saturnino Eibarramendia – the father of Don Rafael and grandfather of Crisóstomo who is said to have founded the town of San Diego when it was still a vast forest.
- Luis Chiquito – He is a businessman who is friends with Padre Martin, Kapitan Tiago, and another businessman named Martin Aristorena.

== Translations ==
Many English and Tagalog translations have been made of Noli Me Tángere, as well as a few other languages. The copyrights of the original text have expired, and the copyrights of some translators have also expired, so certain translations are in the public domain and have been put online by Project Gutenberg.

=== English ===
- Friars and Filipinos (1911) by Frank Ernest Gannett. Available freely via Project Gutenberg.
- The Social Cancer (1912) by Charles Derbyshire. Available freely via Project Gutenberg.
- "Noli Me Tángere": A Complete English Translation of Noli Me Tángere from the Spanish of Dr. José Rizal (1956) by Senator Camilo Osías.
- The Lost Eden (1961) by Leon Ma. Guerrero.
- Noli Me Tángere (1996) by María Soledad Lacson-Locsin.
- Noli Me Tángere (2006) by Harold Augenbraum. Published by Penguin Classics.
- Noli Me Tángere: A Shortened Version in Modern English with an Introduction and Notes (2016) by Nicholas Tamblyn.

=== Tagalog ===
- Noli Me Tángere (also titled Huwag Akong Salangin Nino Man/Nobody Dare Touch Me) (1906) by Pascual H. Poblete. Available freely via Project Gutenberg.
- Noli Me Tángere (1946) by Domingo D. de Guzman, Francisco Laksamana and María Odulio de Guzman.
- Noli Me Tángere (1961) by Patricio Mariano.
- Noli Me Tángere (1997) by Virgilio Almario.
- Noli Me Tángere (1999) by Ofelia Jamilosa-Silapan, Tagalog translation of the English translation by León Ma. Guerrero.

=== Other languages ===
- Au Pays des Moines (In the Land of Monks) (1899, French) by Henri Lucas and Ramon Sempau. Available freely via Project Gutenberg.
- Noli me Tángere: Filippijnsche roman (Noli Me Tángere: Filipino Novel) (1912, Dutch) by Abraham Anthony Fokker, published by Soerabaijasch Handelsblad. Available freely via Project Gutenberg.
- Jangan Sentuh Aku (Noli me Tángere) (1975, Indonesian) Translation by Tjetje Jusuf. Published by PT. DUNIA PUSTAKA JAYA, Jakarta.
- N'y touchez pas! (Don't touch it!) (1980, French) Translation by Jovita Ventura Castro, Collection UNESCO, Connaissance de l'Orient, Gallimard, Paris.
- Noli me tángere (1987, German) by Annemarie del Cueto-Mörth. Published by Insel Verlag.
- Noli me tángere (2003, Italian) by Vasco Caini. Published by Debatte editore, Livorno, Italy, ISBN 88-86705-26-3.
- 나를 만지지 마라, Parts 1 and 2 (Nareul manjiji mara, "Touch me not") (2015, Korean) by Kim Dong-yeop. Published by Nulmin Publishing House, Seoul, South Korea, ISBN 9791195163861.
- Noli me tangere (2023, Czech) by Dusan Safr Ospalik. Published by Continual Progress, Litomerice, Czechia, ISBN 978-80-908649-6-2.

== Adaptations ==
Noli Me Tángere has been adapted for literature, theater, television, and film.

- 1915: Noli Me Tángere, a silent film adaptation by Edward M. Gross.
- 1930: Noli Me Tángere, another silent film adaptation, directed by José Nepomuceno under Malayan Movies.
- 1951: National Artist for Cinema Gerardo de León directed a motion picture titled Sisa, starring Anita Linda in the role of the titular character.
- 1957: Noli Me Tangere, an opera in Filipino (Tagalog) composed by National Artist for Music Felipe Padilla de Leon with libretto by National Artist for Visual Arts Guillermo Tolentino.
- 1961: Noli Me Tángere, a faithful film adaptation of the novel, was directed by Gerardo de León for Bayanihan-Arriva Productions, featuring Eduardo del Mar in the role of Crisóstomo Ibarra. Released for the birth centenary of José Rizal, the motion picture was awarded the Best Picture in the 10th FAMAS Awards.
- 1979: Kanser (Noli Me Tangere), play in Filipino (Tagalog) written by Jomar Fleras. World premiere in 1979 at Cultural Center of the Philippines by theater group Bulwagang Gantimpala. It has been staged annually by Gantimpala Theater (the group's new name) since 1989. In 2015, it was adapted into a sung-through musical by Gantimpala Theater with music composed by Joed Balsamo.
- 1993: Noli Me Tángere, a 13-episode miniseries by Eddie S. Romero which premiered on ABC on July 6. This adaptation features Joel Torre in the role of Crisóstomo Ibarra, Chin Chin Gutierrez as María Clara, Tetchie Agbayani as Sisa, and Daniel Fernando as Elias. It was released on VHS and Betamax in August 1995.
- 1995: Noli Me Tángere, a Filipino (Tagalog) musical adaptation of the novel staged by theater company Tanghalang Pilipino with libretto (book and lyrics) by National Artist for Literature Bienvenido Lumbera and music by National Artist for Music Ryan Cayabyab. It premiered in 1995 at the Cultural Center of the Philippines, directed by Nonon Padilla. It went on to tour Japan. It starred John Arcilla and Audie Gemora alternating as Crisóstomo Ibarra, Monique Wilson as María Clara, and Regine Velasquez as Sisa. Bernardo Bernardo and Bodjie Pascua alternated as Padre Dámaso, and Nanette Inventor and Sheila Francisco as Dona Victorina. It was restaged in 2005, directed by Paul Morales, and in 2011, directed by Audie Gemora. In 2014, it was staged in Los Angeles, directed by Olga Natividad.
- Several excerpts from Noli Me Tángere were dramatized in the 1998 film José Rizal, with Joel Torre as Crisóstomo Ibarra/Simoun and Monique Wilson as María Clara.
- 1998: Sisa, a remake of the 1951 film of the same name. Written and directed by Mario O'Hara.
- 2005: Noli Me Tángere 2, a modern literary adaptation of the novel written by Roger Olivares.
- 2008–2009: Noli at Fili: Dekada 2000, a stage adaptation of Noli Me Tángere and El Filibusterismo by the Philippine Educational Theater Association, set in the present day, in the fictional town of Maypajo in the province of San Lorenzo. Written by Nicanor G. Tiongson and directed by Soxie Topacio.
- 2019: Damaso is a musical film based on the novel.
- 2022-2023: Maria Clara at Ibarra, a TV drama broadcast on GMA Network inspired by the two Rizal novels.
- 2024: A new Noli script in Filipino adapted from the novel titled "Dr. Jose Rizal's Noli Me Tangere" written and directed by Ronald Mervin Sison, KR was premiered in Canada with the cooperation of the Knights of Rizal and support of The Philippine Heritage Council of Manitoba in a reading production on June 19 to commemorate the author's birthday.

== In popular culture ==
- A series of streets in the Sampaloc area of Manila are named after characters from the novel (Ibarra, Sisa and Basilio streets, to name a few).
- A street in Makati is named 'Ibarra Street,' located between Matanzas and Guernica streets.
- A restaurant serving Filipino cuisine at Greenbelt in Makati is called Restaurante Pia y Dámaso, after María Clara's biological parents.
- A restaurant chain called Crisóstomo features dishes from Filipino history and culture such as "Atcharra ni Ibarra". Its sister restaurant is called Elías.
- The character of Padre Damaso was used to describe Catholic priests, as activist Carlos Celdran did during a Mass at the Manila Cathedral in 2010.
- A fruit wine has its own brand which is called María Clara Sangria.

== See also ==
- List of books banned by governments
- Ibong Adarna
- Florante at Laura
- El filibusterismo
- Mga Ibong Mandaragit
