= El filibusterismo =

1891 novel by Jose Rizal

El Filibusterismo
- Replica of the original facsimile cover
- Author: José Rizal
- Original title: El filibusterismo
- Language: Spanish
- Genre: Novel, fiction
- Publisher: F. Meyer van Loo Press, Ghent, Belgium
- Publication date: 1891
- Publication place: Captaincy General of the Philippines, Spanish Empire
- Media type: Print (Hardback and paperback)
- Preceded by: Noli Me Tangere
- Followed by: Makamisa
- Text: El Filibusterismo at Wikisource

El Filibusterismo (transl. The filibusterism; The Subversive or The Subversion, as in the Locsín English translation, are also possible translations), also known by its alternative English title The Reign of Greed, is the second novel written by Philippine national hero José Rizal. It is the sequel to Noli Me Tángere and, like the first book, was written in Spanish. It was first published in 1891 in Ghent.

The novel centers on the Noli-El Fili duology's main character Crisóstomo Ibarra, now returning for vengeance as "Simoun". The novel's dark theme departs dramatically from the previous novel's hopeful and romantic atmosphere, signifying Ibarra's resort to solving his country's issues through violent means, after his previous attempt in reforming the country's system made no effect and seemed impossible with the corrupt attitude of the Spaniards toward the Filipinos.

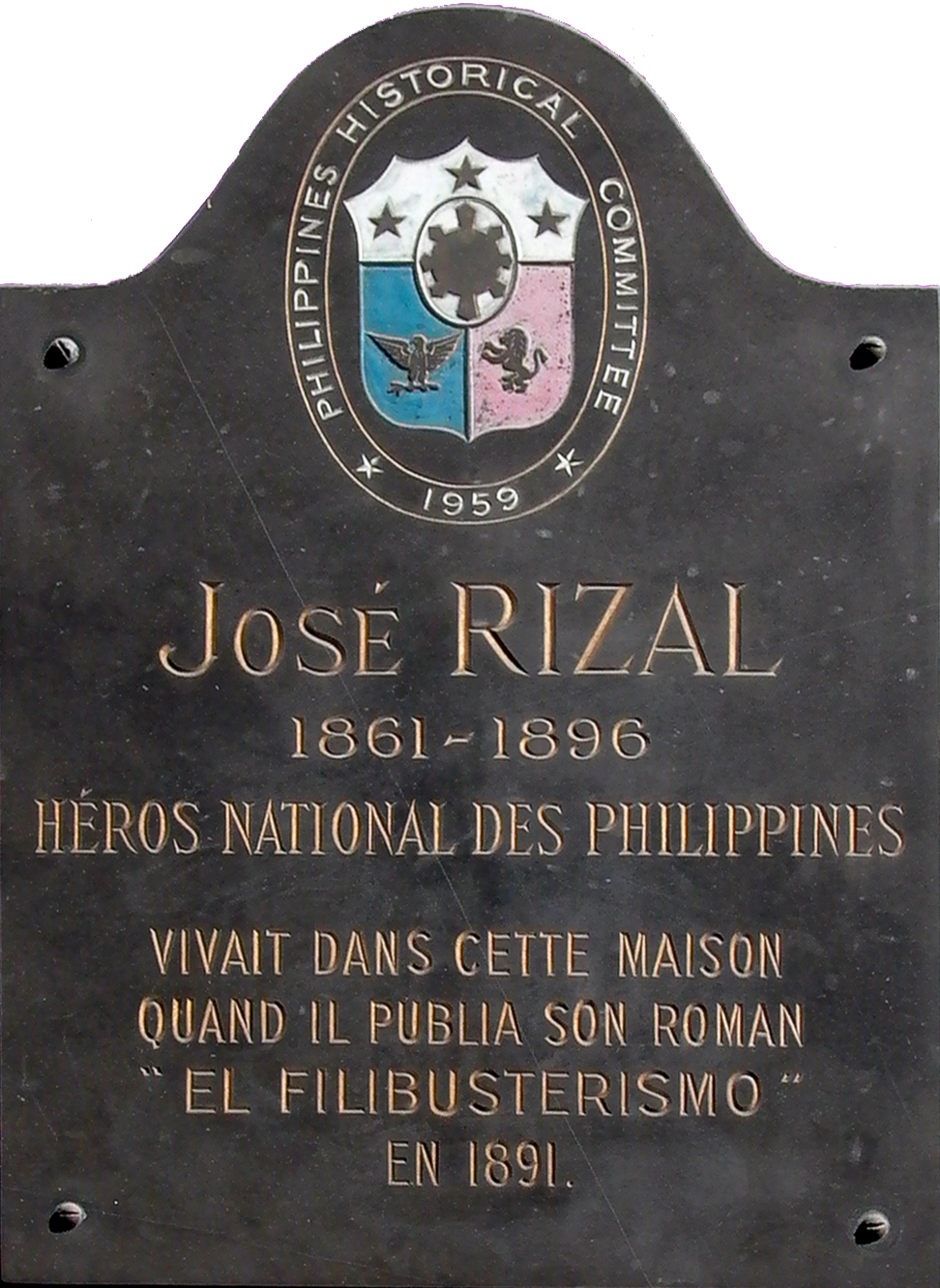
Historical marker issued by the Philippines Historical Committee in 1959 and installed in Ghent marking the site where Rizal lived when the novel was published

The novel, along with its predecessor, was banned in some parts of the Philippines as a result of their portrayals of the Spanish government's abuses and corruption. These novels, along with Rizal's involvement in organizations that aimed to address and reform the Spanish system and its issues, led to Rizal's exile to Dapitan and eventual execution. Both the novel and its predecessor, along with Rizal's last poem, are now considered Rizal's literary masterpieces.

Both of Rizal's novels had a profound effect on Philippine society in terms of views about national identity, the Catholic faith and its influence on the Filipino's choice, and the government's issues in corruption, abuse of power, and discrimination, and on a larger scale, the issues related to the effect of colonization on people's lives and the cause for independence. These novels later on indirectly became the inspiration to start the Philippine Revolution.

Throughout the Philippines, the reading of both the novel and its predecessor is now mandatory for high school students throughout the archipelago, although it is now read using English, Filipino, and the Philippines' regional languages.

== Plot ==
In the events of the previous novel, Crisóstomo Ibarra, a reform-minded mestizo who tried to establish a modern school in his hometown of San Diego and marry his childhood sweetheart, was falsely accused of rebellion and presumed dead after a shootout following his escape from prison. Elías, his friend who was also a reformer, sacrificed his life to give Crisóstomo a chance to regain his treasure and flee the country, and hopefully continue their crusade for reforms from abroad. After a thirteen-year absence from the country, a more revolutionary Crisóstomo has returned, having taken the identity of Simoun, a mysterious wealthy jeweler whose objective is to drive the government to commit as much abuse as possible in order to drive people into revolution.

Simoun goes from town to town presumably to sell his jewels. Reaching San Diego, he detours to the Ibarras' forested land to retrieve more of his treasures buried in the mausoleum. There, his true identity as Crisóstomo Ibarra is discovered by a now-grown Basilio, who was also in the mausoleum visiting his mother's grave. In the years since the death of his mother, Basilio had been serving as Capitán Tiago's servant in exchange for being allowed to study, and is now an aspiring doctor on his last year at university as well as administrator and apparent heir to Capitán Tiago's wealth. Simoun reveals his motives to Basilio and offers him a place in his plans. Too secure of his place in the world, Basilio declines.

At Barrio Sagpang in the town of Tiani, Simoun stays at the house of the village's cabeza de barangay, Tales. Having suffered misfortune after misfortune in recent years, Kabesang Tales is unable to resist the temptation to steal Simoun's revolver and join the bandits. In Los Baños, Simoun joins his friend, the Captain-General, who is then taking a break from a hunting excursion. In a friendly game of cards with him and his cronies, Simoun raises the stakes higher and higher and half-jokingly secures blank orders for deportation, imprisonment, and summary execution from the Captain-General.

Later on, Simoun goes to Manila and meets Quiroga, a wealthy Chinese businessman and aspiring consul-general for the Qing dynasty. Knowing Quiroga is heavily in his debt, Simoun offers him a steep discount if the former stores his massive arsenal of rifles in Quiroga's warehouses, to be used presumably for extortion activities with Manila's elite. Despite his hatred of guns and weaponry, Quiroga reluctantly agrees to do the job and uses his bazaar as a front.

During the Quiapo Fair, a talking heads exhibit ostensibly organized by an American named Mr. Leeds but secretly commissioned by Simoun is drawing popular acclaim. Padre Bernardo Salví, now chaplain of the Convent of the Poor Clares, attends one of the performances. The exhibit is set in Ptolemaic Egypt but features a tale that closely resembled that of Crisóstomo Ibarra and María Clara, and their fate under Salví. The show ends with an ominous vow of revenge. Deeply overcome with guilt and fear, Salví recommends the show be banned, but not before Mr. Leeds sailed for Hong Kong.

Months pass and the night of Simoun's revolution comes. Simoun visits Basilio in Tiago's house and tries to convince him again to join his revolution. He reveals his plan for the attack: a cannon volley shall be fired, at which point Kabesang Tales, now a bandit identifying himself as Matanglawin, and Simoun, who managed to deceive and recruit a sizable rogue force among the government troops, will lead their forces into the city. The leaders of the Church, the University, scores of bureaucrats, the Captain-General himself, as well as the bulk of officers guarding them are all conveniently located in one place, the theater where a controversial and much-hyped performance of Les cloches de Corneville is taking place. While Simoun and Matanglawin direct their forces, Basilio and several others are to raid the Convent of the Poor Clares and rescue María Clara.

However, Basilio reports to Simoun that María Clara died just that afternoon, after suffering the travails of monastic life under Salví, who always lusted after her. Simoun, driven by grief, aborts the attack and becomes crestfallen throughout the night. It will be reported later on that he suffered an "accident" that night, leaving him confined to his bed.

The following day, posters threatening violence to the leaders of the university and the government are found at the university doors. A reform-oriented student group to which Basilio belonged is named the primary suspects; the members are arrested, including Basilio, despite his absence from the group's mock dinner the night before. They are eventually freed through the intercession of relatives, except for Basilio who is an orphan and has no means to pay for his freedom. During his imprisonment, he learns that Capitán Tiago has died, leaving him with nothing; it is revealed that Tiago's will was actually forged by his spiritual advisor Padre Írene, who also supplied him with opium; his childhood sweetheart Juli has committed suicide to avoid getting raped by parish priest Camorra when she tried asking for help on Basilio's behalf; and that he has missed his graduation and will be required to study for another year, but now with no funds to go by. Released through the intercession of Simoun, a darkened, disillusioned Basilio joins Simoun's cause wholeheartedly.

Simoun, meanwhile, has been organizing a new revolution, and he reveals his plans to a now committed Basilio. The wedding of Juanito Peláez and Paulita Gómez will be used to coordinate the attack upon the city. As the Peláez and Gómez families are prominent members of the Manila elite, leaders of the church and civil government are invited to the reception. The Captain-General, who declined to extend his tenure despite Simoun's urging, is leaving in two days and is the guest of honor.

Simoun will personally deliver a pomegranate-shaped crystal lamp as a wedding gift. The lamp is to be placed on a plinth at the reception venue and will be bright enough to illuminate the entire hall, which was also walled with mirrors. After some time the light will flicker as if to go out. When someone attempts to raise the wick, a mechanism hidden within the lamp containing fulminated mercury will detonate, igniting the lamp which is actually filled with nitroglycerin, killing everyone in an enormous blast.

At the sound of the explosion, Simoun's mercenaries will attack, reinforced by Matanglawin and his bandits who will descend upon the city from the surrounding hills. Simoun postulates that in the chaos, the masses, already worked to a panic by the government's heavy-handed response to the poster incident, as well as rumors of German ships in the bay to lend their firepower to any uprising against the Spanish government, will step out in desperation to kill or be killed. Basilio and a few others are to put themselves at their head and lead them to Quiroga's warehouses, where Simoun's guns are still being kept. The plan thus finalized, Simoun gives Basilio a loaded revolver and sends him away to await further instructions.

Basilio walks the streets for hours and passes by his old home, Capitán Tiago's riverside house on Anloague Street. He discovers that this was to be the reception venue – Juanito Peláez's father bought Tiago's house as a gift for the newlywed couple. Sometime later, he sees Simoun enter the house with the lamp, then hastily exit the house and board his carriage. Basilio begins to move away but sees Isagani, his friend and Paulita Gómez's former lover, sadly looking at Paulita through the window. Noting how close they were to the condemned house, Basilio tries to head Isagani off, but Isagani was too dazed with grief to listen to him. In desperation, Basilio reveals to Isagani how the house is set to explode at any time then. But when Isagani still refuses to heed him, Basilio flees, leaving Isagani to his fate.

Seeing Basilio's demeanor, Isagani is belatedly unnerved by the revelation. Isagani rushes into the house, seizes the lamp, and throws it into the river. With this, Simoun's second revolution fails as well.

In the following days, as the trappings at the reception venue are torn down, sacks containing gunpowder are discovered hidden under the boards all over the house. Simoun, who had directed the renovations, is exposed. With the Captain-General having left for Spain, Simoun is left without his protector and is forced to flee. A manhunt ensues and Simoun is chased as far away as the shores of the Pacific. He then spends the rest of his days hiding in the ancestral mansion of Padre Florentino, Isagani's uncle.

One day, the lieutenant of the local Guardia Civil informs Florentino that he received an order to arrest Simoun that night. In response, Simoun drinks the slow-acting poison which he always kept in a compartment in his treasure chest. Simoun then makes his final confession to Florentino, first revealing his true name, to Florentino's shock. He goes on to narrate how thirteen years before, as Crisóstomo Ibarra, he lost everything in the Philippines despite his good intentions. Crisóstomo swore vengeance. Retrieving some of his family's treasure that Elias had buried in the Ibarra mausoleum in the forest, Crisóstomo fled to foreign lands and engaged in trade. He took part in the war in Cuba, aiding first one side and then another, but always profiting. There Crisóstomo met the Captain-General who was then a major, whose goodwill he won first by loans of money, and afterwards by covering his criminal activity. Crisóstomo bribed his way to secure the major's promotion to Captain-General and his assignment to the Philippines. Once in the country, Crisóstomo then used him as a blind tool and incited him to all kinds of injustice, taking advantage of the Captain-General's insatiable lust for gold.

The confession is long and arduous, and night has fallen when Crisóstomo finishes. In the end, Florentino assures the dying man of God's mercy, but explains that his revolution failed because he has chosen means that God cannot sanction. Crisóstomo bitterly accepts the explanation and dies.

Realizing that the arresting officers will confiscate Crisóstomo's possessions, Florentino divests him of his jewels and casts them into the sea, proclaiming that they are best hidden under the waters for the time being to ensure that they cannot be used to distort justice or incite greed, and that God shall provide the means to draw them out should people need wealth for a righteous cause.

== Major characters ==
- Simoun – Crisóstomo Ibarra in disguise, returning as the wealthy jeweler Simoun. His appearance is described as being tanned, having a sparse beard, long white hair, and large blue-tinted glasses. He was sometimes crude and confrontational. He was derisively described by Custodio and Ben-Zayb as an American mulatto or a British Indian. While presenting as the arrogant elitist on the outside, he secretly plans a violent revolution in order to avenge himself for his misfortunes as well as hasten Elías' reformist goals.
- Basilio – son of Sisa and another character from Noli Me Tángere. In the events of El Fili, he is an aspiring and successful physician on his last year at university and was waiting for his license to be released upon his graduation. After his mother's death in the Noli, he applied as a servant in Capitán Tiago's household in exchange for food, lodging, and being allowed to study. Eventually he took up medicine, and with Tiago having retired from society, he also became the manager of Tiago's vast estate. He is a quiet, contemplative man who is more aware of his immediate duties as a servant, doctor, and member of the student association than he is of politics or patriotic endeavors. His sweetheart is Juli, the daughter of Kabesang Tales whose family took him in when he was a young boy fleeing the Guardia Civil and his deranged mother.
- Isagani – Basilio's friend. He is described as a poet, taller and more robust than Basilio although younger. He is the nephew of Padre Florentino but is also rumored to be his son with his old sweetheart. Isagani was finishing his studies at the Ateneo Municipal and is planning to take medicine. A member of the student association, Isagani is proud and naive, and tends to put himself on the spot when his ideals are affronted. His unrestrained idealism and poeticism clash with the more practical and mundane concerns of his girlfriend, Paulita Gómez. When Isagani allows himself to be arrested after their association is outlawed, Paulita leaves him for Juanito Peláez. In his final mention in the novel, he was bidding goodbye to his landlords, the Orenda family, to stay with Florentino permanently.
- Father Florentino – Isagani's uncle and a retired priest. Florentino was the son of a wealthy and influential Manila family. At his influential mother's insistence, he broke off an affair with his sweetheart and entered the priesthood, devoting himself to his parish. An indio (native), Florentino was a secular priest, one unaffiliated with the Catholic religious orders, yet his parish drew in huge income. When the 1872 Cavite mutiny broke out, he promptly resigned from priesthood, fearing unwanted attention. He retired to his family's large estate along the shores of the Pacific. He is described as white-haired, with a quiet, serene personality and a strong build. He did not smoke or drink. He was well respected by his peers, even by Spanish friars and officials.
- Father Fernández – a Dominican who was a friend of Isagani. Following the incident with the posters, he invited Isagani to a dialogue, not so much as a teacher with his student but as a friar with a Filipino. Although they failed to resolve their differences, they each promised to approach their colleagues with the opposing views from the other party – although both feared that given the animosity that existed between their sides, their own compatriots may not believe in the other party's existence.
- Capitán Tiago – Don Santiago de los Santos. María Clara's father. Having several landholdings in Pampanga, Binondo, and Laguna, as well as taking ownership of the Ibarras' vast estate, Tiago still fell into depression following María's entry into the convent. He alleviated this by smoking opium, which quickly became an uncontrolled vice, exacerbated by his association with Padre Írene who regularly supplied him with the substance. Tiago hired Basilio as a capista, a servant given the opportunity to study as part of his wages; Basilio eventually pursued medicine and became his caregiver and the manager of his estate. Tiago died of shock upon hearing of Basilio's arrest and Padre Írene's embellished stories of violent revolt.
- Captain-General – the highest-ranking official in the Philippines during the Spanish colonial period. The Captain-General in the novel is Simoun's friend and confidant, and is described as having an insatiable lust for gold. Simoun met him as a major during the Ten Years' War in Cuba. He secured the major's friendship and promotion to Captain-General through bribes. When he was posted in the Philippines, Simoun used him as a pawn in his own power plays to drive the country into revolution. The Captain-General was shamed into not extending his tenure after being rebuked by a high official in the aftermath of Basilio's imprisonment.
- Father Bernardo Salví – a Franciscan friar, the former parish priest of San Diego and now the director and chaplain of the Santa Clara convent. The epilogue of Noli Me Tángere implies that Salví regularly rapes María Clara when he is present at the convent. In El Filibusterismo, he is described as her confessor. In spite of reports of Ibarra's death, Salví believed that Ibarra is still alive and lived in constant fear of his revenge.
- Father Hernando de la Sibyla – a Dominican introduced in Noli Me Tángere as the curate of Binondo, who now serves as the director and chaplain of the University of Santo Tomas. He is described as a liberal friar who prefers reason.
- Father Millon – a Dominican who serves as a physics professor in the University of Santo Tomás.
- Quiroga – a Chinese businessman who aspired to be a consul for China in the Philippines. Simoun coerced Quiroga into hiding weapons inside the latter's warehouses in preparation for the revolution.
- Don Custodio – Custodio de Salazar y Sánchez de Monteredondo, a famous "contractor" who was tasked by the Captain-General to develop the students association's proposal for an academy for the teaching of Spanish, but was then also under pressure from the priests to protect their prerogatives as monopolizers of instruction. Some of the novel's most scathing criticism is reserved for Custodio, a Peninsular Spaniard portrayed as an opportunist who married his way into high society, who regularly criticized favored ideas that did not come from him, but was ultimately, laughably incompetent.
- Ben-Zayb – A columnist for the Manila Spanish newspaper El Grito de la Integridad. Ben-Zayb is his pen name and is an anagram of Ybáñez, an alternate spelling of his last name Ibáñez. His first name is not mentioned. Ben-Zayb is said to have the looks of a friar, and believes that in Manila they think because he thinks. He is deeply patriotic, sometimes to the point of jingoism. As a journalist, he had no qualms twisting details to make a story sound better than it actually was. Father Camorra derisively calls him an ink-slinger.
- Father Camorra – the parish priest of Tiani. Ben-Zayb's regular foil, he is said to look like an artilleryman in counterpoint to Ben-Zayb's friar looks. He stops at nothing to mock and humiliate Ben-Zayb's liberal pretensions. In his own parish, Camorra has a reputation for unrestrained lustfulness. He drives Juli into suicide after attempting to rape her inside the convent. For his misbehavior he was "detained" in his order's luxurious riverside villa just outside Manila.
- Father Írene – Capitán Tiago's spiritual adviser. Along with Don Custodio, Írene is severely criticized as a priest who allied with temporal authority for the sake of power and monetary gain. Known to many as the final authority who Custodio consults, the student association sought his support and gifted him with two chestnut-colored horses, yet he betrayed the students by counseling Custodio into making them fee collectors in their own school, which was then to be administered by the Dominicans instead of being a secular and privately managed institution as the students envisioned. Írene secretly but regularly supplies Capitán Tiago with opium while exhorting Basilio to do his duty. Írene embellished stories of panic following the outlawing of the student association Basilio was part of, hastening Capitán Tiago's death. With Basilio in prison, he then removed Basilio out of Tiago's last will and testament, ensuring he inherited nothing.
- Placido Penitente – a student of the University of Santo Tomas who had a distaste for study and would have left school if it were not for his mother's pleas for him to stay. He clashes with his physics professor, who then accuses him of being a member of the student association, whom the friars despise. Following the confrontation, he meets Simoun at the Quiapo Fair. Seeing potential in Placido, Simoun takes him along to survey his preparations for the upcoming revolution. The following morning Placido has become one of Simoun's committed followers. He is later seen with the former schoolmaster of San Diego, who was now Simoun's bomb-maker.
- Paulita Gómez – the girlfriend of Isagani and niece of Doña Victorina, the old Indio who passes herself off as a Peninsular, who is the wife of the quack doctor Tiburcio de Espadaña. In the end, she and Isagani part ways, Paulita believing she will have no future if she marries him. She eventually marries Juanito Peláez.

Characters from Barrio Sagpang:

- Kabesang Tales – Telesforo Juan de Dios, a former cabeza de barangay of Barrio Sagpang in Tiani. He was a sugarcane planter who cleared lands he thought belonged to no one, losing his wife and eldest daughter in the endeavor. When the Dominicans took over his farm, he fought to his last money to have it retained in his possession. While his suit against the Dominicans was ongoing, he was kidnapped by bandits while he was patrolling his fields. When in spite of all Tales lost the case, he not only lost his farm but was also dealt with a heavy fine. He later joined the bandits and became one of their fiercest commanders.
- Tandang Selo – father of Kabesang Tales and grandfather of Tano and Juli. A deer hunter and later a broom-maker, he and Tales took in the young, sick Basilio who was then fleeing from the Guardia Civil. On Christmas Day, when Juli left to be with her mistress, Selo suffered some form of stroke that impaired his ability to speak. After Juli's suicide, Selo left town permanently, taking with him his hunting spear. He was later seen with the bandits and was killed in an encounter with the Guardia Civil – ironically by the gun of the troops' sharpshooter Tano, his grandson.
- Juli – Juliana de Dios, the girlfriend of Basilio and the youngest daughter of Kabesang Tales. When Tales was captured by bandits, Juli petitioned Hermana Penchang to pay for his ransom. In exchange, she had to work as Penchang's maid. Basilio ransomed her and bought a house for her family. During Basilio's prison stint, Juli approached Tiani's curate, Padre Camorra, for help. When Camorra tried to rape her, Juli jumped to her death from the church's tower.
- Tano – Kabesang Tales's son, second to Lucia who died in childhood. He was nicknamed "Carolino" after returning from Guardia Civil training in the Carolines. His squad was escorting prisoners through a road that skirted a mountain when they were ambushed by bandits. In the ensuing battle, Tano, the squad's sharpshooter, killed a surrendering bandit from a distance, not knowing it was his own grandfather Selo.
- Hermana Penchang – the one among the "rich folks" of Tiani who lent Juli money to ransom Kabesang Tales from the bandits. In return, Juli will serve as her maid until the money was paid off. Penchang is described as a pious woman who speaks Spanish; however, her piety was clouded over by the virtues taught by the friars. While Juli was in her service, she made her work constantly, refusing to give her time off so she can take care of her grandfather Selo.
- Hermana Báli – Juli's mother-figure and counselor. She accompanied Juli in her efforts to secure Kabesang Tales' ransom and later on Basilio's release. Báli was a panguinguera – a gambler – who once performed religious services in a Manila convent. When Tales was captured by bandits, it was Báli who suggested to Juli the idea to borrow money from Tiani's wealthy citizens, payable when Tales' legal dispute over his farm was won.

Student association for the teaching of Spanish:

- Macaraig – the leader. He is described as wealthy, with his own coach, driver, and set of horses. He is said to own several houses and he is lending one to serve as the schoolhouse for their planned Spanish language academy. After the outlawing of the group, he was the first to post bail. He then left the country after his release.
- Sandoval – a Peninsular who had come to Manila as a government employee and was finishing his studies, and who had completely identified himself with the cause of the Filipino students. After the outlawing of the group, he still managed to pass his courses through sheer oratorical skill.
- Pecson – described as chubby, pessimistic, and having an annoying grin. He is Sandoval's regular foil when Sandoval launches into any kind of patriotic, optimistic speech. After they receive disappointing news about their Spanish language academy project, it was Pecson who suggested a torch-lit dinner at the Panciteria Macanista de Buen Gusto, just a block away from the Binondo Church and Convent, served by naked Chinese waiters. From there Sandoval and Pecson became more gracious to each other.
- Tadeo – a truant and charlatan who regularly dreamed of an eternal "holiday" from school, but was all the same beloved by professors and passed courses. A longtime Manila resident, he is seen having fun by telling outrageous stories about himself to a newcomer student from his home province. After the outlawing of the group, he alone seemed to welcome imprisonment as it meant not going to school. His holiday realized at last, he "celebrated" by setting up a bonfire using his books upon his release.
- Juanito Peláez – Isagani's rival for Paulita Gómez's affection. He was the son of a Timoteo Peláez, a metalworks trader. He was a favorite of his professors. A regular prankster, he was said to have developed a hump by playing some trick and then hunching behind his classmates. He paid his dues to the student association, but broke away just as easily when the association was outlawed. Following Isagani's arrest, Paulita breaks off from Isagani to marry Juanito.

== Adaptations ==
- 1962: El Filibusterismo, a film directed by Gerardo de León and starring Pancho Magalona as Simoun/Crisóstomo Ibarra
- 1970: El Filibusterismo, an opera composed by Felipe Padilla de León with libretto by Anthony Morli
- 1991: El Filibusterismo, a Filipino (Tagalog) musical adaptation of the novel staged by theater company Tanghalang Pilipino with libretto (book and lyrics) by Paul Dumol and Jovy Miroy and music by Ryan Cayabyab. It premiered in 1991 at the Cultural Center of the Philippines, and was directed by Nonon Padilla
- 1998: José Rizal, a Filipino movie that tells the life of Rizal and features scenes from the novel.
- 2018: Ang Luha at Lualhati ni Jeronima, a Filipino short film by CJ Santos inspired by the novel's third chapter
- 2023: Maria Clara at Ibarra, a TV drama broadcast on GMA Network inspired by the two Rizal novels.
- Annually: Gantimpala Theater's Stage Play of the Same Title. One notable actor that has played the role of Simoun was Roeder Camañag.

== Other languages ==
El Filibusterismo(2026, Czech) by Dusan Safr Ospalik. Published by Continual Progress, Litomerice, Czechia, ISBN 978-80-908649-7-9.

== See also ==
- Ibong Adarna
- Florante at Laura
- Noli Me Tángere
