= Vibal Publishing House =

Philippine publishing house

Vibal Group, Inc. (formerly Vibal Publishing House, Inc.)
- Status: Active
- Founded: 1953
- Founder: Hilarion P. Vibal; Esther A. Vibal
- Country of origin: Philippines
- Headquarters location: 1253 Gregorio Araneta Avenue, Quezon City, 1114 Metro Manila
- Distribution: Nationwide
- Key people: Gaspar A. Vibal (President) Maria Kristine E. Mandigma (Chief Operating Officer)
- Publication types: Books, textbooks, e-books and other educational printed materials
- Fiction genres: Non-fiction
- No. of employees: 300+
- Official website: www.vibalgroup.com

Vibal Publishing House, Inc. (also known as Vibal Group, Inc., Vibal, or VPHI) is a major publishing house in the Philippines based in Quezon City. Vibal was founded in 1953 by Hilarion P. Vibal and by his wife, Esther Asuncion-Vibal. Vibal is a textbook, reference materials, and multimedia products publisher and is the biggest in the country. In 2011, in partnership with Procter & Gamble, Vibal introduces digital classrooms and low-cost digital education tablets, for the digitization of education in the country.

== History ==
Vibal was founded in 1953 by Hilarion P. Vibal, a veteran journalist, and by his wife, Esther Asuncion-Vibal.

In 1963, it published the science textbook called the Science and Health for Everyone and Science and Health for Better Living. The following year, it published the New Adventures in Arithmetic and School Time.

In 1977, English Reader textbook was published and released. It contains topics on mathematics, science, and values education.

In 1978, it celebrated its 25th anniversary by inaugurating its new four-storey complex at the corner of EDSA and Quezon Avenue.

In 2000, it initiated moves to diversify its product line to include multimedia educational materials in VHS and CD formats. Four years later, Vibal published the first full-color textbook in the country, the Science & Technology Modular Approach I-IV.

In 2007, Vibal won the first National Book Development Board (NBDB) Quality Seal Award for its Experiencing Mathematics – Advanced Algebra, Trigonometry and Statistics. Two years later, the Vibal achieved the Quality Seal Award for two of its textbooks: Rainbows in English Grade 5 and Excelling in Mathematics Grade 3. In 2010, Language and Literature IV was accorded the same seal.

In 2011, Vibal, Procter & Gamble, Samsung, and Robinsons Supermarket introduced the "eStudyante" program. The program focuses in distributing laptops and other electronic learning devices to public elementary and high schools.

In 2012, Vibal and Microsoft, in cooperation with the Department of Education, have partnered to create digital classrooms. Later in the same year, Vibal introduced in the Digital Education Conference at the Philippine Normal University a "kariton" education server, which can be wheeled in and out of classrooms to enable digital learning and two low-cost tablet models aimed at schools in the Philippines to support the patent lack of books and resources in the education system.

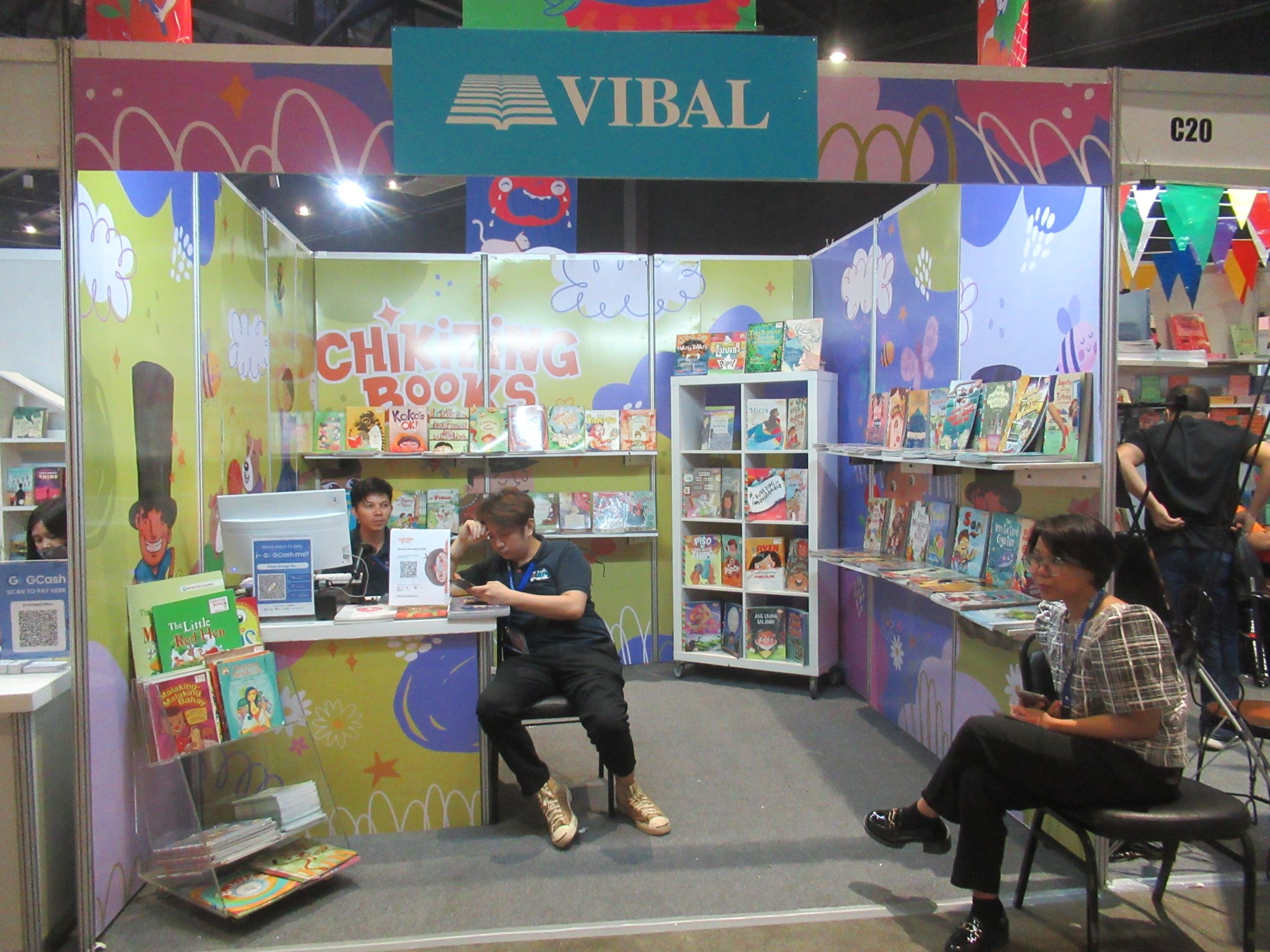
Chikiting Books section

In 2013, the Center for Digital Education was launched at the Philippine Normal University. It focuses in promoting the use of technology in Philippine education. The center is an air-conditioned classroom with at least 20 personal computers and tablets donated by Vibal.

== See also ==
- Filipiniana
- WikiPilipinas
- Literacy in the Philippines
- Philippine Literature
