= Philippine literature in Spanish =

Philippine literature in Spanish (Spanish: Literatura filipina en español; Filipino: Literaturang Pilipino sa Espanyol) is a body of literature made by Filipino writers in the Spanish language. Today, this corpus is the third largest in the whole corpus of Philippine literature (Philippine Literature in Filipino being the first, followed by Philippine literature in English). It is slightly larger than the Philippine literature in the vernacular languages. However, because of the very few additions to it in the past 30 years, it is expected that the former will soon overtake its rank.

== History ==
According to Mariñas (1974) Philippine Literature in Spanish can be divided into 5 stages of development namely:

1. Works of Spanish Religious About the Philippines (1593–1800)
2. Formative Stage (1800–1900)
3. Nationalist Stage (1883–1903)
4. The Golden Age (1903–1966)
5. Modern Works (1966–present)

== Spanish religious works about the Philippines (1593–1800) ==
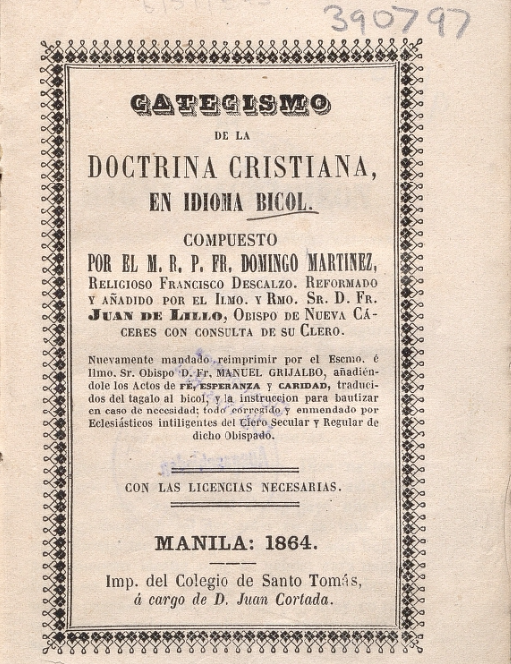
Doctrina Christiana

The arrival of the Spaniards in 1565 brought Spanish culture and language editors. The Spanish conquerors, governing from Mexico for the crown of Spain, established a strict class system that imposed Roman Catholicism on the native population. Augustinian and Franciscan missionaries, accompanied by Spanish soldiers, soon spread Christianity from island to island. Their mission was implemented by the forced relocation of indigenous peoples during this time, as the uprooted natives turned to the foreign, structured religion as the new center of their lives. The priests and friars preached in local languages and employed indigenous peoples as translators, creating a bilingual class known as ladinos.

The natives, called indios, generally were not taught Spanish, but the bilingual individuals, notably poet-translator Gaspar Aquino de Belén, produced devotional poetry written in the Roman script in the Tagalog language. Pasyon, begun by Aquino de Belen, is a narrative of the passion, death and resurrection of Jesus Christ, which has circulated in many versions. Later, the Mexican ballads of chivalry, the corrido, provided a model for secular literature. Verse narratives, or komedya, were performed in the regional languages for the illiterate majority. They were also written in the Roman alphabet in the principal languages and widely circulated.

In the early 17th century a Chinese Filipino printer, Tomás Pinpin, set out to write a book in romanized phonetic script writer. His intention was to teach his fellow Tagalog-speakers the principles of learning Spanish. His book, published by the Dominican press (where he worked) appeared in 1610. Unlike the missionary's grammar (which Pinpin had set in type), the native's book dealt with the language of the colonizers instead of the colonized. Pinpin's book was the first such work ever written and printed by a Philippine native. As such, it is richly instructive for what it tells us about the interests that animated Tagalog translation and, by implication, Tagalog conversion in the early colonial period. Pinpin construed translation in simple ways to help and encourage Tagalog readers to learn Spanish.

== Formative stage (1800–1873) ==
During the so-called 'Formative Stage', Filipino writers began to recognize the Philippines a separate entity from Spain and codified these in different form of expressions.

Among the first Filipinos to produce works is Luis Rodríguez Varela, a Criollo born in Tondo (which was province outside Manila walls but now incorporated as a district) in 1768.

Among the works, the earliest recognized work in this era is "Proclama historial que para animar a los vasallos que el Señor Don Fernando VII tiene en Filipinas a que defendian a su Rey del furor de su falso amigo Napoleón, primer Emperador de fanceses, escribe, dedicada e imprime a su costa Don Luis Rodríguez Varela". As the title expresses, the work is full of pro-Hispanic sentiments.

In 1810, a year later the publication of the said work, Fernández de Folgueras, Governor General to the Philippines was granted by the 'Office of the Censor' to publish three books. The books were entitled: "Elogio a las Provincias de los Reynos de la España Europea", "Elogio a la mujer" and "El Parnaso Filipino". The last book, a collection of poems written by various Filipino poets at that time, is still now one of the most important works in the entire corpus of Philippine Literature in Spanish. And although it was severely criticized during its heyday (in 1814), it bears the merit of being the first book about the Philippines in Castilian that is purely literary and not didactic or religious.

This era also saw the publication of works by José Vergara, one of the Filipino representatives to the Spanish Cortes; and Juan Atayde (1838–1896), a military official. Most of the works published during these years are poetry.

But since most of the people who are knowledgeable in Spanish are those that belong to the Catholic hierarchy, religious works still make up a large part of the corpus.

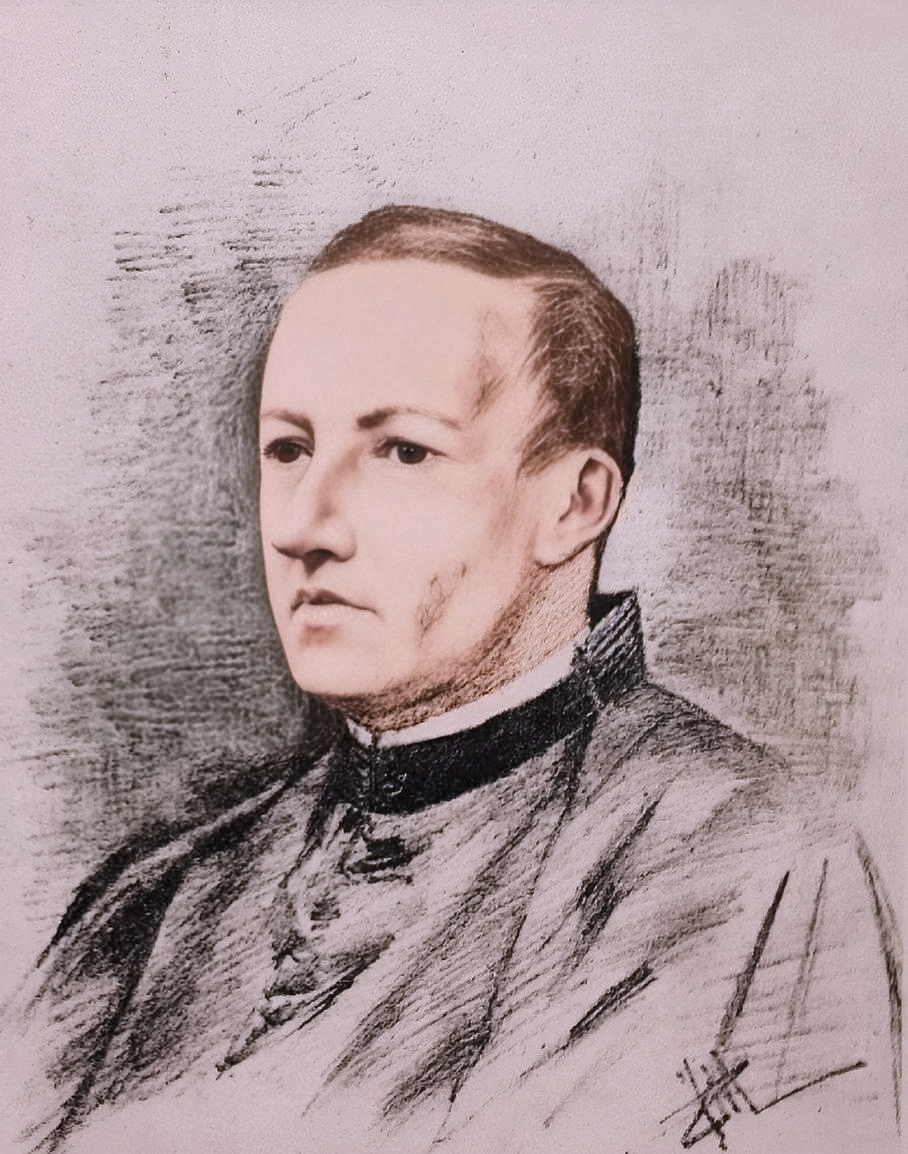
Pedro Peláez

During his stay as Vicar General of the Archdiocese of Manila, Fr. Pedro Peláez, S.J., (1812–1863) founded the El Católico Filipino, a journal of religious nature. While serving the said post, he also taught at the University of Santo Tomas and acted as a correspondent to La Generación, a journal published in Madrid. In his works, Peláez worked much to the defense of his fellow Filipinos.

Though it was first printed anonymously, a flyer published in Madrid in 1862 entitled "Documentos importantes para la cuestión pendiente sobre la provisión de curatos en Filipinas" was also attributed to him. It was also Peláez who first used the term perla de oriente to refer to the Philippines. This was made popular later by José Rizal in his last poem and the modern translation into Filipino by the national anthem. The term was first used in 1855 in his work entitled "Sermón de San Andrés".

With the death of Peláez, another priest continued the battle for self-identity in the person of Fr. José Apolonio Burgos (1837–1877). Burgos was a student of Peláez at UST. A year after an earthquake of 1863 that took the life of his teacher, he graced the Madrid journal La Verdad with "Manifesto que a la noble Nación Española dirigen los leales filipinos" to defend the heavy criticisms of the regular priests against the Filipinos of that time. He was also able to publish "El Eco Filipino" in order to reiterate the call of reform to the Philippine government and hierarchy.

His other notable works are "Mare Magnum" (1851), "Estado de Filipinas a la llegada de los españoles" (written in 1871 but published posthumously in 1894), "Ciencias y costumbres de los filipinos" (1868), "Cuentos y leyendas filipinas" (1860), "Es verdad los milagros" (1860) and "Los Reyes Filipinos".

With the opening of the Suez Canal, many Spaniards came to the Philippines. Some even studied in the islands which gave birth to some publications like La Oceanía Española, El Comercio and La Voz de España.

== Nationalist stage (1883–1903) ==
La antigua civilización tagálog by Pedro Paterno

The opening of Philippine ports to foreign commerce, the transition to an export economy, and the establishment of regular maritime routes between the Philippines and Spain brought social and economic changes in the Philippines. More affluent families who benefited from the economic development of the Philippines during the late 19th century sent their children to Spain and Europe to take advantage of the educational opportunities offered to them by the liberalized Spanish colonial policy at that time. These educated young men, also called ilustrados, would later become the spokesmen of the grievances and the aspirations of their people. They gathered around Madrid's Circulo Hispano-Filipino, founded in 1882, which then evolved into the Asociación Hispano-Filipina, and from 1888 onwards these young men started to write for the newspaper La Solidaridad, with propagandist intentions and nationalist aspirations. Many of these ilustrados were also protagonists of the Philippine Revolution, which ended with the Philippine independence from Spain and the cession of the Philippines to the United States of America.

Noli Me Tángere by José Rizal

A potent tool in promoting Filipino nationalism in Spanish was the foundation of La Solidaridad (more fondly called La Sol by the members of the propaganda movement) on February 15, 1889. With the help of this organ, Filipino national heroes like José Rizal, Graciano Lopez Jaena, Marcelo H. del Pilar, etc. were able to voice out their sentiments.

Perhaps, the best-known editor of the La Sol is Graciano Lopez Jaena (1856–1896). Some of his more famous works include "Fray Botod" and "La Hija del Fraile".

Pedro Paterno also tried to establish some newspaper like "La Patria", "El Libera", "Soberanía Nacional" and "Asamblea Filipina". This also became outlets where Filipino were able to publish their works in Spanish.

Filipino novels in Spanish are quite rare. And aside from José Rizal's Noli Me Tángere and El Filibusterismo, Paterno published an earlier novel entitled "Ninay" in 1885. The work was depicting local colour and was one of the inspirations that led José Rizal to write his own.

Aside from "Ninay", Paterno were able to publish "Doña Perfecta" (1876), a novel; and "Sampaguita" (1880), a collection of poems; "La antigua civilización tagalog" (1887), "El cristianismo en la antigua civilización tagalog" (1892), and "La familia tagala en la historia universal", all expositories.

If Paterno was able to introduce the Tagalogs into the world, Isabelo de los Reyes (fondly called Don Belong by contemporaries) did the same for the Ilocanos.

In 1882, Don Belong published his "La invasión de Limahong". This made him enter the world of journalism which gave him all the outlets he needed to express his nationalism. Some of the newspapers he worked for were El Diario de Manila, La Oceanía Española, Revista Catolica, El Progreso, El Republicano and El Heraldo.

Considered the founder of the workers' movement in the Philippines, Don Belong founded the La actividad del obrero in 1902 that served as the main voice of the working class. Later, he founded the Iglesia Filipina Independiente as a revolt to the abuses of the Catholic hierarchy in his hometown. The foundation of the church was instrumental in the translation of the Holy Scriptures in Ilocano.

Some of Don Belong's more renowned works include "El Folklore Filipino" (1889), "Las Islas Visaya en la Época de la Conquista" (1889), "Historia de Filipinas" (1889) and "Historia de Ilocos" (1890).

The era also saw the works of José Rizal, Antonio Luna, Eduardo de Lete, Emilio Jacinto, José Palma, Felipe Calderón and Apolinario Mabini.

In Cebu, the first Spanish newspaper, El Boletín de Cebú, was published in 1886.

== The Golden Age (1903–1966) ==
Historia de Filipinas by Filipino historian Manuel Artigas y Cuerva

Paradoxically, the greatest portion of Spanish literature by native Filipinos was written during the American commonwealth period, because the Spanish language was still predominant among the Filipino intellectuals. One of the country's major writers, Claro Mayo Recto, continued writing in Spanish until 1960. Other well-known Spanish-language writers, especially during the American period were Francisco Alonso Liongson (El Pasado Que Vuelve, 1937), Isidro Marfori, Cecilio Apóstol (Pentélicas, 1941), Fernando Ma. Guerrero (Crisálidas, 1914), Flavio Zaragoza Cano (Cantos a España and De Mactán a Tirad) and others. Manila, Cebu, Bacolor and many other cities and towns across the Philippines had its share of writers in Spanish, most of whom flourished during the early decades of the century.

Among the newspapers published in Spanish were El Renacimiento, La Democracia, La Vanguardia, El Pueblo de Iloílo, El Tiempo and others. Three magazines, The Independent, Philippine Free Press and Philippine Review were published in English and Spanish.∓

In 1915, the local newspapers began publishing sections in English and after World War II and the destruction of Intramuros where a large part of the Hispanic community was based, Hispano-Filipino literature started declining and the number of books and magazines written in Spanish by Filipino authors was greatly reduced.

== Modern works (1966–present) ==
Although the output of Philippine literature in Spanish has diminished in later years, there are still some notable writers, like José del Mar, who won a Premio Zóbel (Zobel Prize) for his work, "Perfiles", in 1965, Francisco Zaragoza (1914–1990), author of "Castala Íntima", Guillermo Gómez Rivera, academic director of the Philippine Academy of the Spanish Language, Edmundo Farolan, director of Revista Filipina and recipient of the Premio Zóbel in 1982 for his poetry work "Tercera Primavera" or Lourdes Castrillo Brillantes, a prominent Filipino female writer, author of "80 Años del Premio Zóbel" (80 Years of the Zobel Prize), a compilation of Spanish literature written by Filipinos.

== Notable writers ==
- Antonio Abad (1894–1970)
- Fr. Francisco Ignacio Alcina, S.J. (1610–1674)
- Rosauro Almario (1886–1933)
- Uldarico A. Alviola (1883–1966)
- Cecilio Apóstol (1877–1938)
- Jesús Balmori (1887–1948)
- Lourdes Castrillo Brillantes
- Edmundo Farolán
- Gilbert Luis R. Centina III
- Guillermo Gómez Rivera (b. 1936)
- Fernando María Guerrero (1873–1929)
- León María Guerrero III (1915–1982)
- Francisco Alonso Liongson (1896–1965)
- Graciano López Jaena (1856–1896)
- Apolinario Mabini (1864–1903)
- José Palma (1876–1903)
- Marcelo H. del Pilar (1850–1896)
- Claro M. Recto (1890–1960)
- José Rizal (1861–1896)

== Notable works written by Filipino authors ==
- Noli Me Tangere and El Filibusterismo, both written by Jose Rizal. The novels created controversy among the Spanish authority in the Philippines. They were instrumental in creating a Filipino sense of identity during the Spanish colonial period by caricaturing and exposing the abuses of the Spanish colonial government and religious authority.
- Impresiones written by Antonio Luna. It is a collection of articles previously written for the newspaper La Solidaridad depicting Spain, the Spaniards, and their manners in a critical, corrosive and sarcastic fashion.
- La oveja de Nathán written by the 1929 Premio Zóbel awardee Antonio Abad. Set during World War I, this novel movingly expresses the Filipino nation's desire for independence from the United States through the story of Mariano Bontulan, a young linotypist in a government printing office, whose work allows him to be well versed in global issues, eventually spurring him to enlist to fight in the First World War on the side of the Americans in the hopes of seeing the United States fulfill, in return, its promise of independence of the Philippines. The book won Abad the 1929 Premio Zóbel.
- Mi casa de Nipa written by the 1927 Premio Zóbel awardee Jesús Balmori. It is a collection of poems that won him the 1940 Commonwealth Literary Award for poetry. The book was then published in 1941. This collection of poems is considered the culmination of Balmori's career as a poet, as he finally achieved his intent of creating a Filipino poetical aesthetic, overcoming Spanish modernism as a means of achieving a new literary stage, the culmination of the Golden Age of Spanish-Filipino literature.
- Cuentos de Juana: narraciones malayas de las Islas Filipinas written by the 1956 Premio Zóbel awardee Adelina Gurrea. It is a collection of short stories featuring indigenous folklore of the island of Negros, such as the tamao, the tic-tic, the asuang, the camá-camá, the bagát and the cafre. First published in Spain in 1943, the book then won first prize for literature in a contest held by the Latin Union Writers' Association in Paris in 1951.
- Quis ut Deus: o, el teniente Guimo, el brujo revolucionario de Yloilo written by the 1975 Premio Zóbel awardee Guillermo Gómez Rivera in Spanish. Published in 2015, the novel recounts the legend of Teniente Guimo, the aswang of Ilongo folklore and a soldier of the Philippine Revolutionary Government in Iloilo which resisted the American invasion. The Instituto Juan Andrés and Grupo de Investigación Humanismo-Europa of Spain awarded the author the 2015 I Premio Jose Rizal de las Letras Filipinas for the publication of this novel.
- El diario de Frankie Aguinaldo written by the 1982 Premio Zóbel awardee Edmundo Farolán in Spanish. The book was published in 2016. In the form of philosophical anthropology and in line with the tradition of existentialist novels like Niebla of Miguel de Unamuno and Nausea of Jean-Paul Sartre, this novel recounts the life of Frankie Aguinaldo, the alter-ego of the author. Farolán was awarded the 2017 III Premio Jose Rizal de las Letras Filipinas for the publication of his novel.

== See also ==
- Philippine Academy of the Spanish Language
- Literature of the Philippines
- Philippine literature in English
- Spanish-language literature
- Filipiniana
- Philippine National Book Awards
- List of Filipino writers
- Tagalog literature
- Cebuano literature
- Hiligaynon literature
- Ilokano literature
- Pangasinan literature
- Waray literature
