= Spanish language in the Philippines =

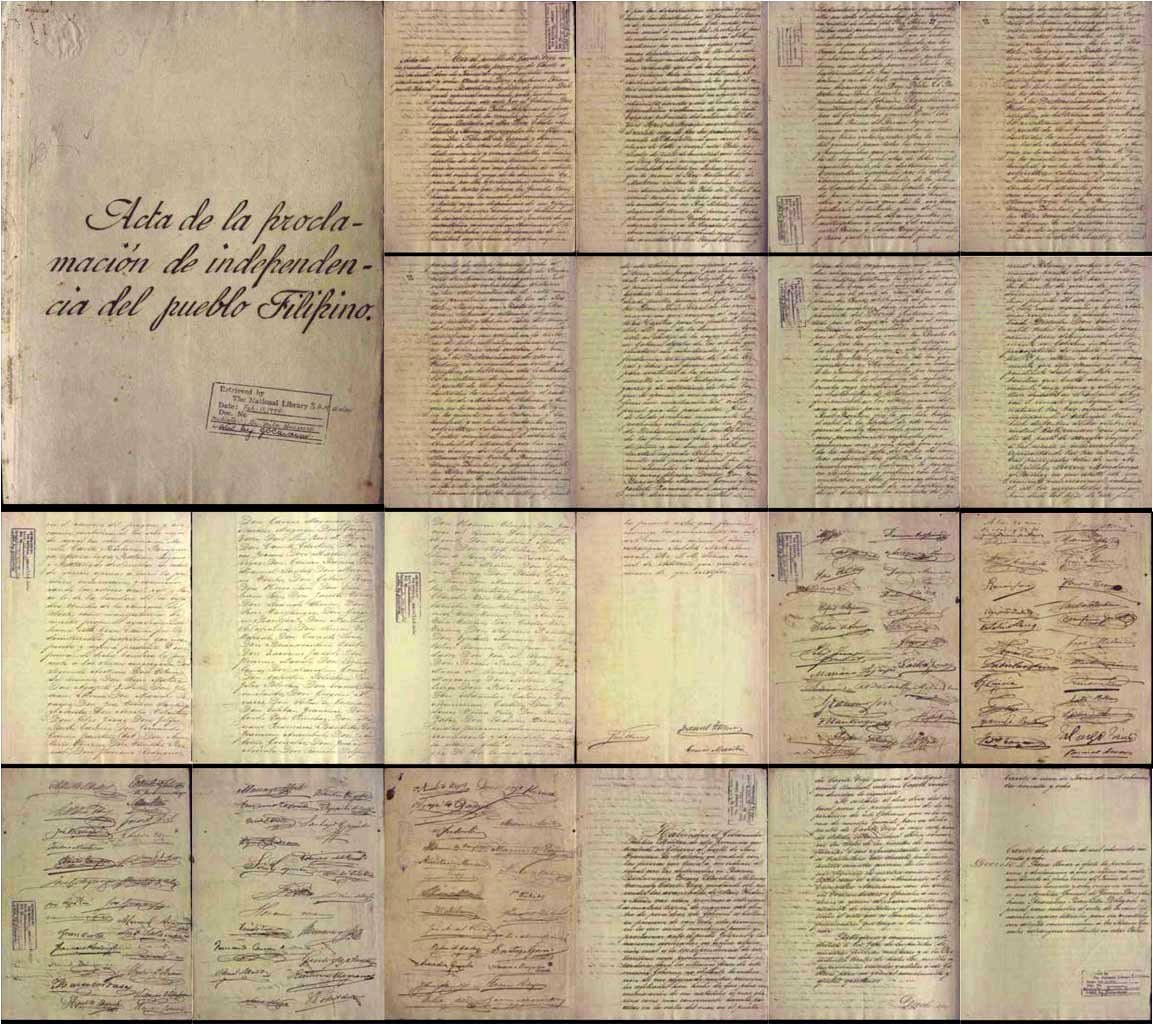
Official copy of the "Acta de la proclamación de independencia del pueblo Filipino", the Philippine Declaration of Independence

Spanish was the sole official language of the Philippines throughout its more than three centuries of Spanish rule, from the late 16th century to 1898, then a co-official language (with English) under its American rule, a status it retained (now alongside Filipino and English) after independence in 1946. Its status was initially removed in 1973 by a constitutional change, but after a few months it was once again designated an official language by a presidential decree. However, with the adoption of the present Constitution, in 1987, Spanish became designated as an auxiliary or "optional and voluntary language".

During the period of Spanish viceroyalty (1565–1898), it was the language of government, trade, education, and the arts. With the establishment of a free public education system set up by the viceroyalty government in the mid-19th century, a class of native Spanish-speaking intellectuals called the Ilustrados was formed, which included historical figures such as José Rizal, Antonio Luna and Marcelo del Pilar. By the end of Spanish rule, a significant number of urban and elite populations were conversant in Spanish, although only a minority of the total population had knowledge of the language.

It served as the country's first official language as proclaimed in the Malolos Constitution of the First Philippine Republic in 1899 and continued to be widely used during the first few decades of U.S. rule (1898–1946). Gradually however, the American government began promoting the use of English at the expense of Spanish, characterizing it as a negative influence of the past. By the 1920s, English became the primary language of administration and education. While it continued to serve as an official language after independence in 1946, the state of Spanish continued to decline until its removal from official status in 1973. Today, the language is no longer present in daily life and despite interest in some circles to learn or revive it, it continues to see dwindling numbers of speakers and influence. Roughly 400,000 Filipinos (less than 0.5% of the population) were estimated to be proficient in Spanish in 2020.

The Spanish language is regulated by the Academia Filipina de la Lengua Española, the main Spanish-language regulating body in the Philippines, and a member of the Asociación de Academias de la Lengua Española, the entity which regulates the Spanish language worldwide.

== Background ==
=== Overview ===
Flag of Spain (1785–1873 and 1875–1931)

Spanish was the language of government, education and trade throughout the three centuries of Spanish rule and continued as the country's lingua franca until the first half of the 20th century. Spanish was the official language of the Malolos Republic, "for the time being", according to the Malolos Constitution of 1899. Spanish was also the official language of the Cantonal Republic of Negros of 1898 and the Republic of Zamboanga of 1899.

While Spanish was introduced through the colonial public education system, it was never spoken on a wide scale in the Philippines. Only populations in urban areas or in places with a significant Spanish presence used the language on a daily basis or learned it as a second or third language.

During the early part of the U.S. administration of the Philippine Islands, Spanish was widely spoken and relatively well maintained throughout the American colonial period. Even so, Spanish was a language that bound leading men in the Philippines like Trinidad Hermenegildo Pardo de Tavera y Gorricho to President Sergio Osmeña and his successor, President Manuel Roxas. As a senator, Manuel L. Quezon (later President), delivered a speech in the 1920s entitled "Message to My People" in English and in Spanish.

=== Official language ===
Spanish remained an official language of government until a new constitution ratified on January 17, 1973, designated English and Pilipino, spelled in that draft of the constitution with a "P" instead of the more modern "F", as official languages. Shortly thereafter, Presidential Proclamation No. 155 dated March 15, 1973 ordered that the Spanish language should continue to be recognized as an official language so long as government documents in that language remained untranslated. A later constitution ratified in 1987 designated Filipino and English as official languages. Also, under this Constitution, Spanish, together with Arabic, was designated an optional and voluntary language.

=== Influence ===
There are thousands of Spanish loanwords in 170 native Philippine languages, and Spanish orthography has influenced the spelling system used for writing most of these languages.

=== Chavacano ===
Chavacano (also called Zamboangueño) is a Spanish-based creole language spoken mainly in the southern province of Zamboanga and, to a much lesser extent, in the province of Cavite in the northern region of Luzon. An estimated 689,000 people speak Chavacano. In 2010, the Instituto Cervantes de Manila estimated the number of Spanish speakers in the Philippines in the area of three million, which included the native and the non-native Chavacano and Spanish speakers.

== History ==
=== Spanish colonial period ===
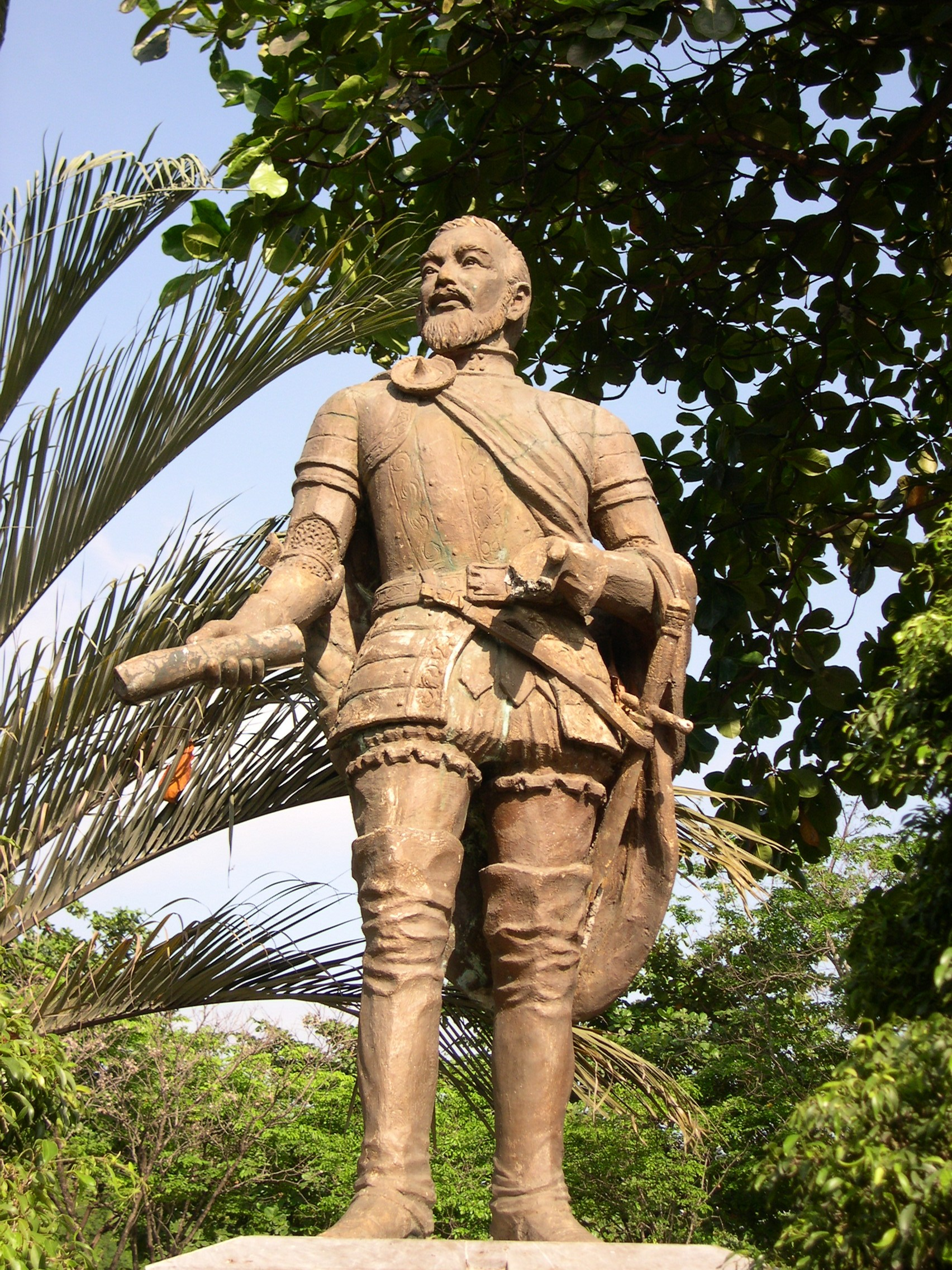
Statue of Miguel López de Legazpi just outside Fort San Pedro, Cebu City

Spanish was the language of government, education and trade throughout the three centuries (333 years) of the Philippines being part of the Spanish Empire and continued to serve as a lingua franca until the first half of the 20th century. It was first introduced to the Philippines in 1565, when the conquistador Miguel López de Legazpi founded the first Spanish settlement on the island of Cebú. The Philippines, ruled first from Mexico City and later from Madrid, was a Spanish territory for 333 years (1565–1898). Schooling was a priority, however. The Augustinians opened a school immediately upon arriving in Cebú in 1565. The Franciscans followed suit when they arrived in 1577, as did the Dominicans when they arrived in 1587. Besides religious instruction, these schools taught how to read and write and imparted industrial and agricultural techniques.

Initially, the stance of the Roman Catholic Church and its missionaries was to preach to the natives in local languages, not in Spanish. The priests learned the native languages and sometimes employed indigenous peoples as translators, creating a bilingual class known as Ladinos. Before the 19th century, few natives were taught Spanish. However, there were notable bilingual individuals such as poet-translator Gaspar Aquino de Belén. Gaspar produced Christian devotional poetry written in the Roman script in Tagalog. Pasyon is a narrative of the passion, death, and resurrection of Jesus Christ begun by Gaspar Aquino de Belén, which has circulated in many versions. Later, the Spanish-Mexican ballads of chivalry, the corrido, provided a model for secular literature. Verse narratives, or komedya, were performed in the regional languages for the illiterate majority.

In the early 17th century, a Tagalog printer, Tomás Pinpin, set out to write a book in romanized phonetic script to teach the Tagalogs how to learn Castilian. His book, published by the Dominican press in which he worked, appeared in 1610, the same year as Blancas's Arte. Unlike the missionary's grammar, which Pinpin had set in type, the Tagalog native's book dealt with the language of the dominant, rather than the subordinate, other. Pinpin's book was the first such work ever written and published by a Philippine native. As such, it is richly instructive for what it tells us about the interests that animated Tagalog translation and, by implication, conversion during the early colonial period.

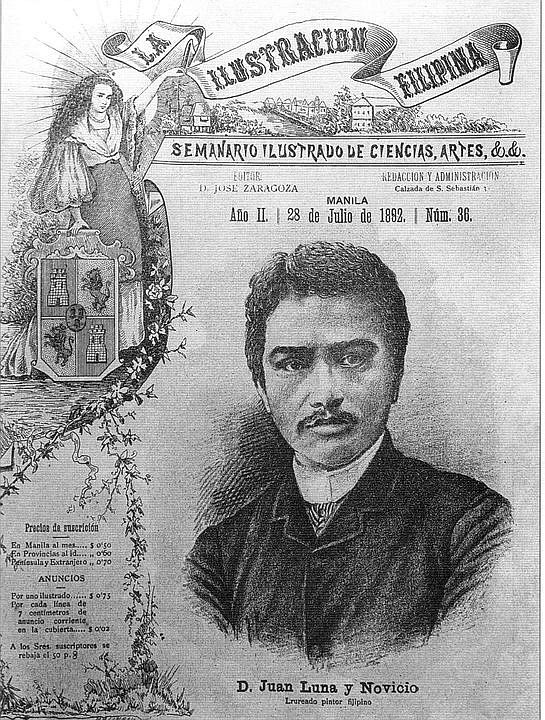
Juan Luna featured on the cover of a Philippine periodical in Spanish

By law, each town had to build two schools, one for boys and the other for girls, to teach the Spanish language and the Christian catechism. There were never enough trained teachers, however, and several provincial schools were mere sheds open to the rain. That discouraged the attendance at school, and illiteracy was high in the provinces until the 19th century, when public education was introduced. The conditions were better in larger towns. To qualify as an independent civil town, a barrio or group of barrios had to have a priest's residence, a town hall, boys' and girls' schools; streets had to be straight and at right angles to one another so that the town could grow in size; and the town had to be near a good water source and land for farming and grazing.

Better school conditions in towns and cities led to more effective instruction in the Spanish language and in other subjects. Between 1600 and 1865, a number of colleges and universities were established, which graduated many important colonial officials and church prelates, bishops, and archbishops, several of whom served the churches in Hispanic America. The increased level of education eventually led to the rise of the Ilustrados. In 1846, French traveler Jean Baptiste Mallat was surprised at how advanced Philippine schools were. In 1865, the government inaugurated the Escuela Normal (Normal School), an institute to train future primary school teachers. At the same time, primary schooling was made compulsory for all children. In 1869, a new Spanish constitution brought to the Philippines universal suffrage and a free press. El Boletín de Cebú, the first Spanish newspaper in Cebu City, was published in 1886.

In Manila, the Spanish language had been more or less widespread to the point that it has been estimated at 50% of the population knew Spanish in the late 19th century. In his 1898 book "Yesterdays in the Philippines", covering a period beginning in 1893, the American Joseph Earle Stevens, an American who resided in Manila from 1893 to 1894, wrote:

Spanish, of course, is the court and commercial language and, except among the uneducated native who have a lingua of their own or among the few members of the Anglo-Saxon colony, it has a monopoly everywhere. No one can really get on without it, and even the Chinese come in with their peculiar pidgin variety.

Long contact between Spanish and the local languages, Chinese dialects, and later Japanese produced a series of pidgins, known as Bamboo Spanish, and the Spanish-based creole Chavacano. At one point, they were the language of a substantial proportion of the Philippine population. Unsurprisingly, since the Philippines was administrated for centuries from New Spain in present-day Mexico, Philippine Spanish is broadly similar to Latin American Spanish not only in vocabulary but also in pronunciation and grammar.

The Spanish language was the official language used by the civil and judicial administration, and it was spoken by the majority of the population in the main cities and understood by many, especially after the passing of the Education Decree of 1863. By the end of the 19th century, Spanish was either a mother tongue or a strong second language among the educated elite of the Philippine society, having been learned in childhood either directly from parents and grandparents or in school, or through tutoring.

==== Schools ====
In the 16th and the 17th centuries, the oldest educational institutions in the country were set up by Spanish religious orders. The schools and universities played a crucial role in the development of the Spanish language in the islands. Colegio de Manila in Intramuros was founded in 1590. The Colegio formally opened in 1595, and was one of the first schools in the Philippines. In the same year, the University of San Carlos in Cebú, was established as the Colegio de San Ildefonso by the Jesuits. In 1611, the University of Santo Tomás, considered as the oldest existing university in Asia, was inaugurated in Manila by the Dominicans. In the 18th century, fluent male Spanish-speakers in the Philippines were generally the graduates of those schools or of the Colegio de San Juan de Letrán, established in 1620. In 1706, a convent school for Philippine women, Beaterios, was established. It admitted both Spanish and native girls, and taught religion, reading, writing and arithmetic with music and embroidery. Female graduates from Beaterios were fluent in Spanish as well. In 1859, Ateneo de Manila University was established by the Jesuits as the Escuela Municipal.

In 1863, Queen Isabel II of Spain decreed the establishment of a public school system, following the requests of the islands' Spanish authorities, who saw the need of teaching Spanish to the wider population. The primary instruction and the teaching of Spanish was compulsory. The Educational Decree provided for the establishment of at least one primary school for boys and girls in each town and governed by the municipal government. A Normal School for male teachers was established and was supervised by the Jesuits. In 1866, the total population of the Philippines was only 4,411,261. The total public schools was 841 for boys and 833 for girls and the total number of children attending the schools was 135,098 boys and 95,260 girls. In 1892, the number of schools had increased to 2,137, 1,087 of which were for boys and 1,050 for girls. The measure was at the vanguard of contemporary Asian countries and led to an important class of educated natives that sometimes continued their studies abroad, like the national hero José Rizal, who studied in Europe. That class of writers, poets and intellectuals is often referred to as Ilustrados. Ironically, it was during the initial years of American occupation in the early 20th century that Spanish literature and press flourished, partially due to the freedom of the press allowed following the transition to American rule.

==== Filipino nationalism and 19th-century revolutionary governments ====
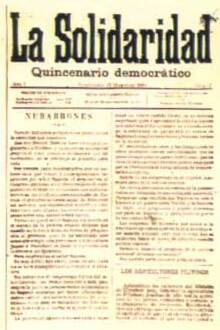
Propaganda in Spanish

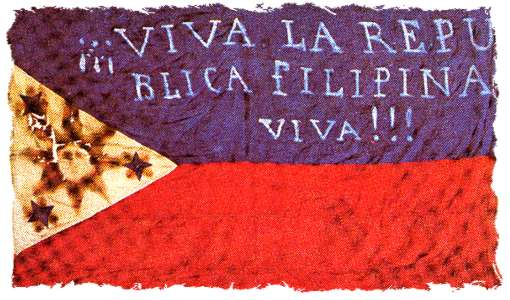
Early flag of the Filipino revolutionaries ("Long live the Philippine Republic!"). The first two constitutions were written in Spanish.

Before the 19th century, Philippine revolts were small-scale. Since they did not extend beyond linguistic boundaries, they were easily neutralized by Spanish forces. With the small period of the spread of Spanish through a free public school system (1863) and the rise of an educated class, nationalists from different parts of the archipelago were able to communicate in a common language. José Rizal's novels, Graciano López Jaena's satirical articles, Marcelo H. del Pilar's anti-clerical manifestos, the bi-weekly La Solidaridad, which was published in Spain, and other materials in awakening nationalism were written in Spanish. The Philippine Revolution fought for reforms and later for independence from Spain. However, it opposed neither Spain's cultural legacy in the islands nor the Spanish language. Even Graciano López Jaena's La Solidaridad, an 1889 article that praised the young women of Malolos who petitioned to Governor-General Valeriano Weyler to open a night school to teach the Spanish language. In fact, the Malolos Congress of 1899 chose Spanish as the official language. According to Horacio de la Costa, nationalism would not have been possible without the Spanish language. By then, the people were increasingly aware of nationalistic ideas and independence movements in other countries.

During the Philippine Revolution, many of the Filipino patriots were fluent in Spanish, though Emilio Aguinaldo, the eventual first president of the Philippines, was more comfortable speaking Tagalog. The 1897 Biak-na-Bato Constitution and the 1898 Malolos Constitution were both written in Spanish. Neither specified a national language, but both recognised the continuing use of Spanish in Philippine life and legislation. Spanish was used to write the Constitution of Biak-na-Bato, Malolos Constitution, the original national anthem, Himno Nacional Filipino, as well as nationalistic propaganda material and literature.

In 1863, the Spanish language was taught freely when a primary public school system was set up for the entire population. The Spanish-speaking Ilustrados (Enlightened Ones) were the educated elite who promoted and propagated nationalism and a modern Filipino consciousness. The Ilustrados and later writers formed the basis of Philippine Classical Literature, which developed in the 19th century.

José Rizal propagated Filipino consciousness and identity in Spanish. Highly instrumental in developing nationalism were his novels, Noli Me Tangere and El Filibusterismo which exposed the abuses of the colonial government and clergy, composed of "Peninsulares." The novels' very own notoriety propelled its popularity even more among Filipinos. Reading them was forbidden because they exposed and parodied the Peninsulares.

=== Philippine–American War ===
The revolutionary Malolos Republic of 1899 designated the Spanish language for official use in its constitution, drawn up during the Constitutional Convention in Malolos, Bulacan. The nascent republic published a number of laws, acts, decrees, and other official issuances. They were published variously in the Spanish, English, and Tagalog, with Spanish predominating. Spanish was also designated the official language of the Cantonal Republic of Negros of 1898 and the Republic of Zamboanga of 1899.

Many Spanish-speaking Filipino families perished during the Philippine–American War. According to the historian James B. Goodno, author of the Philippines: Land of Broken Promises (New York, 1998), one-sixth of the total population of Filipinos, or about 1.5 million, died as a direct result of the war.

=== American colonial period ===
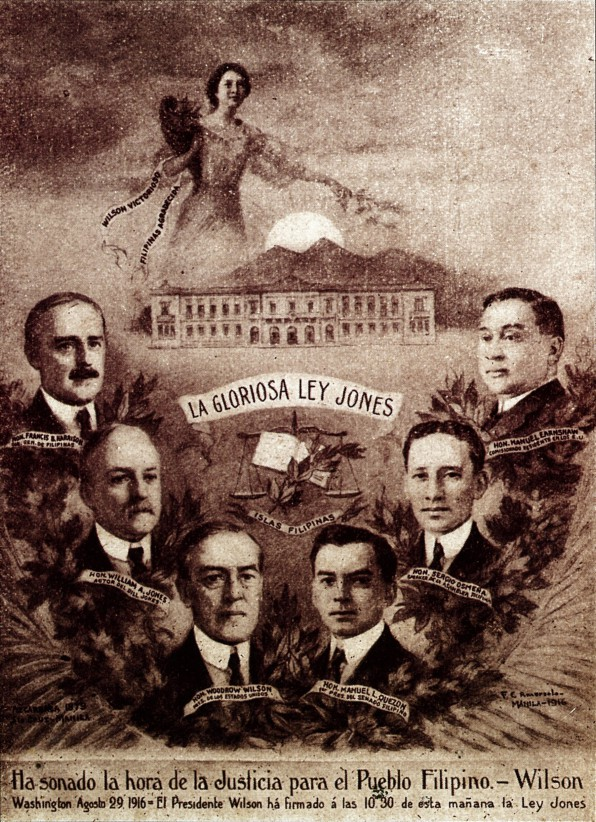
A poster advertising the Jones Law of 1916 in Spanish, The Glorious Jones Law

Emilio Aguinaldo delivers a speech in Spanish (1929)

After the Philippine–American War and the subsequent incorporation of the Philippine archipelago to the dominion of the United States, one of the policies implemented by the new rulers was to institute the English language as the primary language of the country, designating it as the medium of instruction, with the goal of bolstering the annual increase of the number of English-speaking population in the Philippines. However, in spite of this, the Spanish language maintained its hold in the educational system, as many private educational institutions, particularly those administered by religious orders, persisted in using the Spanish language. Only after World War I did the American authorities started to press more and more for the private schools to teach in English, leading to important Catholic universities such as the Ateneo de Manila and the University of Santo Tomas to phase out Spanish in favor of English.

The census of 1903 did not inquire the respondents regarding the language they spoke and understood, but it was asked in the 1918 census, in which it was reported that from a total population of 10,314,310, the number of Filipinos capable of speaking Spanish was 757,463 (or 7.34% of the total population), with 511,721 belonging to the male population and 245,742 belonging to the female population. In contrast, the number of English-speaking Filipinos was 896,258 (or 8.69% of the total population). Greater percentage of Spanish-speaking males compared to their English-speaking counterparts were found in Zamboanga, Manila, Isabela, Cotabato, Marinduque, Cagayan, Iloilo, Cavite, Albay, Leyte, Batangas, and Sorsogon. The province with the greater percentage of Spanish-speaking females compared to their English-speaking counterparts were found in Zamboanga, Cotabato, Manila, Davao, Ambos Camarines, Iloilo, and Sorsogon. The rest of the provinces had greater percentages of English-speaking people, with the provinces of Ifugao, Bontoc, Benguet, and Kalinga registering the greatest percentage of English-speaking males. The census also affirmed that those who learned to speak Spanish or English also possessed the ability to read and write in those languages.

While the 1918 census confirmed the great boost in the position of the English language in the Philippines since the arrival of the first Thomasites, Spanish still retained its privileged position in society, as was made clear by Henry Jones Ford, a professor from Princeton who was sent to the Philippines by the then American President Woodrow Wilson for a "fact-finding mission". In his 1916 report, Ford wrote that the "Filipino gentry speak Spanish and the masses speak native dialects which are not low languages, but are refined and capable instruments of thought", adding later on the following observations:

As a matter of fact Spanish is more than ever the language of polite society, of judicial proceedings and of legislation. More people are speaking Spanish than when American occupation began and indirectly the American schools have promoted that result, inasmuch as educational advance of any kind incites desire to attain the language spoken in good society and thus establish one's position in the ilustrado class.

— Henry Jones Ford

He also made note of the increasing usage of the native vernacular languages through which the literature of Filipino politics reached the masses, with the native newspapers and magazines in the Philippines tending to be bilingual and with the regular form being a Spanish section and a section written in the local vernacular language, while none of them was published in English. Additionally, the most widely circulated American newspaper has a Spanish section.

Antonio Checa Godoy assessed that between the Philippine–American War and the Japanese occupation of the Philippines, more than 220 periodical publications were written in Spanish or, in case of bilingual and even trilingual publications, Spanish was one of the languages used. They are published and disseminated not only in Manila but also in different parts of the country, with more than 30 of them published daily. Checa Godoy also identified the first two decades of the American rule in the Philippines as the "Silver Age" of the Philippine press in Spanish, with number of copies of Spanish language periodical publications being sold daily reaching 30,000 towards the end of the 1920s, more so than the other publications written in other languages. El Renacimiento, a Spanish-Tagalog bilingual newspaper established in 1901, was one of the most influential and widely distributed newspapers of the first decade of American colonial period. It was forced to close in 1908 due to a libel suit brought against it by then Secretary of Interior Dean C. Worcester after the publication of an editorial titled Aves de Rapiña ("Birds of Prey"), which Worcester took to be an insult against his honor and goodwill. Worcester was awarded $30,000 in damages, while the editor and publisher (Teodoro Kalaw and Martín Ocampo) were given jail sentences. It was then re-established by Martín Ocampo in 1910 under the name of La Vanguardia, although it did not prosper until its purchase in 1916 by Alejandro Roces, after which it continued publishing until the days of World War II. Another important newspaper was El Ideal, which was established in 1910 and served as an official organ of the Nationalist Party created by Sergio Osmeña, although it was allowed to die in 1916 due to financial reasons.

After the Silver Age came the period of decadence of the Philippine press written in Spanish, which Checa Godoy identified in the years of the 1920s and the 1930s. During this period, the number of Spanish-language newspapers and their circulation declined, while the presence of newspapers written in English and indigenous languages, especially Tagalog, increased and even overtook Spanish from its dominant position. The decline continued until the events of World War II, which effectively ended the Spanish-language press in the Philippines.

The census of 1939 showed the decline of the Spanish-speaking population in the Philippines, with the numbers slashed almost in half compared to the previous 1918 census: in a total population of approximately 16 million Filipinos, only 417,375 of them (or 2.6% of the population) are literate in the Spanish language. The census also remarked regarding the declining use of Spanish in the Philippines:

In another generation, unless there is a decided increase in the use of Spanish, the persons able to speak it will have dropped to about one percent of the population.

— Census of the Philippines: 1939 (page 330)

The need for a national language other than Spanish or English began to emerge from the late 1920s onwards, as President Manuel Quezon complained that almost as soon as he left Manila his speeches would need to be translated, as neither Spanish nor English could be used as a medium of successful communication throughout the national territory. Inés Villa, the 1932 Premio Zobel awardee, wrote in her prize-winning work "Filipinas en el camino de la cultura" that the educational system during the American period succeeded in its objective of widely disseminating the English language and making it an official language of the government, legislature, courts, commerce and private life, adding that the United States managed to achieve with English for only three decades what Spain failed to achieve with the Spanish language during its approximately four centuries of rule in the Philippines, further noting that as of the writing of her work, for every Filipino that speaks Spanish, there are approximately ten others that can speak English. In 1934, the Tydings–McDuffie Act excluded Spanish entirely from the curriculum of public schools, while the 1934 Constitutional Convention set 1940 as the expiry date of the usage of Spanish as the official language of the legislature and of the courts.

The years of the American colonial period have been identified as the Golden Age of Philippine Literature in Spanish by numerous scholars such as Estanislao Alinea, Luis Mariñas and Lourdes Brillantes. One explanation given to such a designation was the rich volume of literary output produced during this era using the Spanish language. Among the great Filipino literary writers of the period were Fernando María Guerrero, Jesús Balmori, Manuel Bernabé, Claro M. Recto and Antonio Abad. There were three reasons provided for this development, namely the relative freedom of expression during the American period compared to the previous Spanish colonial era, the publication venues provided by the Spanish language periodicals and periodicals written in other languages but with Spanish language sections, and the presence of the Premio Zobel. However, Estanislao Alinea also referred to those years as the "Period of Efflorescence", highlighting the fact the behind the apparent vitality and productivity of these Spanish language writers lied the period of slow decadence and gradual decline of the language itself in the Philippines. Additionally, despite the relevance given to many of these writers in their social and nationalistic roles, even earning them an entry in the 1996 Encyclopedia of the Cultural Center of the Philippines (CCP), most of their literary works received scarce public reception even during their lifetime. According to Rocío Ortuño, the failure of their literary endeavours can be seen in the fact that some of their works were either left unpublished or, in case of their works published in periodicals, never compiled in volumes.

=== Decline of Spanish ===
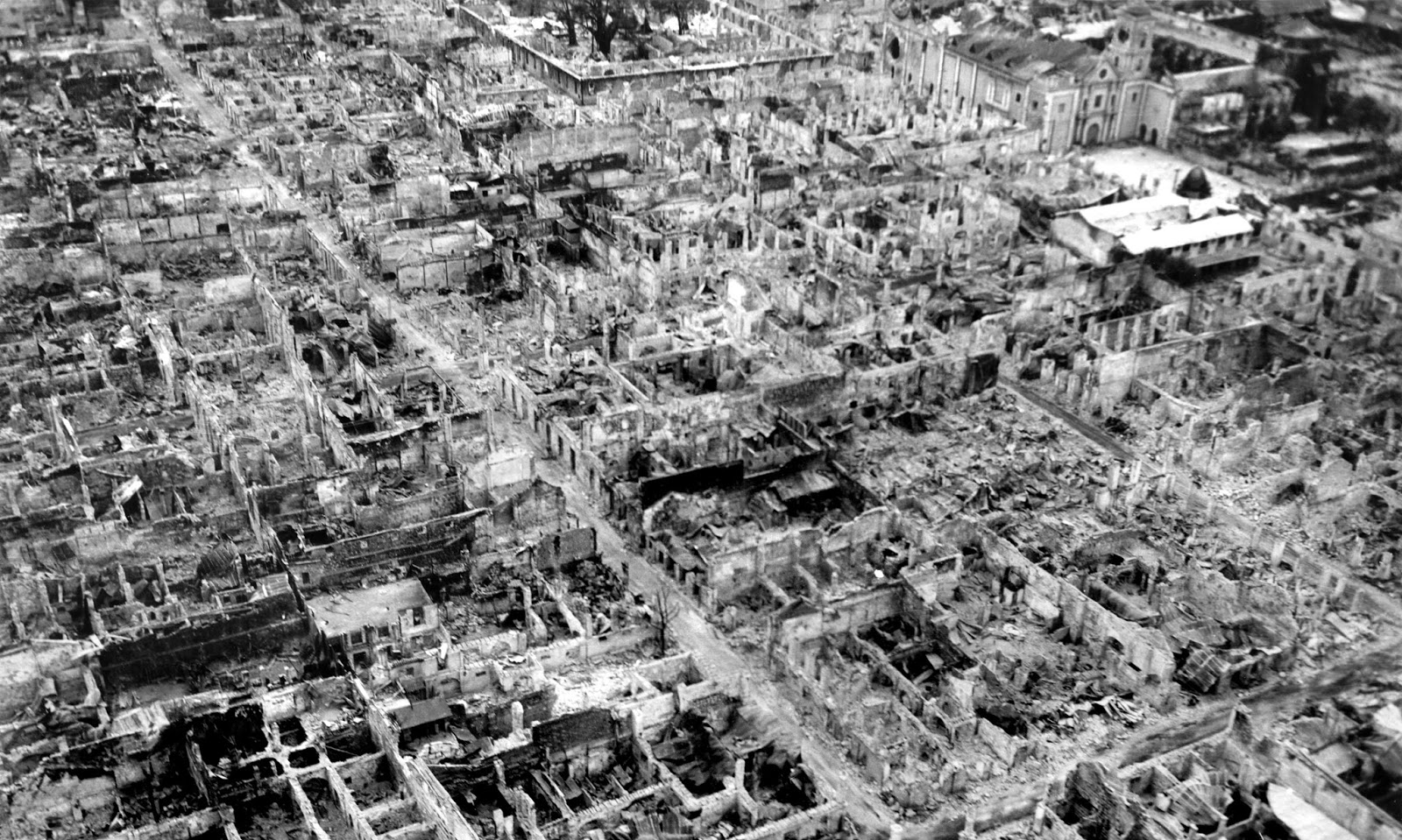
The destruction of Intramuros in May 1945 after the Battle of Manila.

Spanish flourished in the first two decades of the 20th century because of the partial freedom of the press and as an act of defiance against the new rulers. However, it soon declined afterwards as the U.S. administration began a heavier imposition of English as the official language and medium of instruction in schools and universities. Editorials and newspapers were increasingly forced to switch to English, leaving Spanish in a marginal position.

One of the first U.S. provisions in the Philippines, following the recommendations of the Schurman Commission, was the prohibition of Spanish as the language of instruction in public schools. Despite the fact that in 1934 it was established that American sovereignty would cease in 1946, the new Philippine Constitution stated the obligation to maintain English as the sole language of instruction. It is significant that the American language policy had among its main objectives to turn the Filipinos into "a people who can govern themselves", an end for which they would need a common language: English.

In order to preserve Spanish, Enrique Zóbel de Ayala founded the Academia Filipina de la Lengua Española and the Premio Zóbel in 1924 to help maintain and develop the use of Spanish by the Filipino people.

Filipino nationalists and nationalist historiographers during the American colonial period took their liberal ideas from the writings of the 19th-century Filipino propaganda, which portrayed Spain and all things Spanish as negative or evil. Therefore, Spanish as a language was demonized as a sad reminder of the past. Those ideas gradually inculcated into the minds of the young generation of Filipinos (during and after the U.S. administration), which used those history textbooks at school that tended to generalize all Spaniards as villains because of lack of emphasis on Filipino people of Spanish ancestry, who were also against the local Spanish government and clergy and also fought and died for the sake of freedom during the 19th-century revolts during the Philippine Revolution, the Philippine–American War, and the Second World War.

By the 1940s, as children educated in English became adults, the use of Spanish started to decline rapidly. Still, a very significant community of Spanish-speakers lived in the largest cities, with a total population of roughly 300,000. However, with the destruction of Manila during the Japanese occupation in the Second World War, the heart of Spanish in the Philippines had been dismantled. Many Spanish-speaking Filipino families perished during the massacre and the bombing of the cities and municipalities between 1942 and 1945. By the end of the war, an estimated 1 million Filipinos had died. Some of the Spanish-speakers who survived were forced to migrate in the later years.

After the war, Spanish became increasingly marginalized at an official level. As English- and American-influenced pop culture increased, the use of Spanish in all aspects gradually declined. In 1962, Philippine President Diosdado Macapagal decreed that the Philippines would mark independence day on June 12, instead of July 4, when the country gained complete independence from the United States. This reflected a tendency to paint Spain as the villain and the United States as a more benevolent colonial power. Spanish language and culture were demonized again. In 1973, Spanish briefly lost its status as an official language of the Philippines, was quickly redesignated as an official language, and finally lost its official status by the ratification of a subsequent constitution in 1987.

=== 21st-century developments ===
The 21st century has seen a small revival of interest in the language among select circles, with the numbers of those studying it formally at college or taking private courses rising markedly in recent years. A great portion of Spanish learners in the Philippines are in the social sciences, as until recently, many land titles, contracts, newspapers, and literature were still written in Spanish. Some Hispanista groups have even proposed making Spanish a compulsory subject again in school or having it used in administration, although the idea has elicited controversy among non-Spanish-speaking Filipinos.

Under the administration of Gloria Macapagal Arroyo, relations between Spain and the Philippines strengthened. Philippine–Spanish Friendship Day was established to commemorate the cultural and historical ties, friendship, and co-operation between the Philippines and Spain. Additionally, the Department of Education reintroduced Spanish as an elective course in secondary schools in 2008.

During her visit to the Philippines in July 2012, Queen Sofía of Spain expressed her support for the Spanish language to be revived in Philippine schools, with 24 high school across the country offering the language as a subject. In September 2012, an agreement was made between the Philippine and Chilean governments to train Filipino schoolteachers in Spanish while in exchange, the Philippines would help train Chilean schoolteachers in English.

In 2018, the Sangguniang Kabataan of Barangay Cagniog, Surigao City passed a resolution declaring Spanish as one of the official working languages of the SK Barangay Cagniog which lead to enactment of an ordinance introduced by ex - SK Chairperson Frankie Salar and approved by Sangguniang Barangay in 2021. Further, the Sangguniang Panglungsod Surigao returning the ordinance to barangay for amendments, the said ordinance aim to include the teaching the Spanish in the said Barangay.

== Current status ==
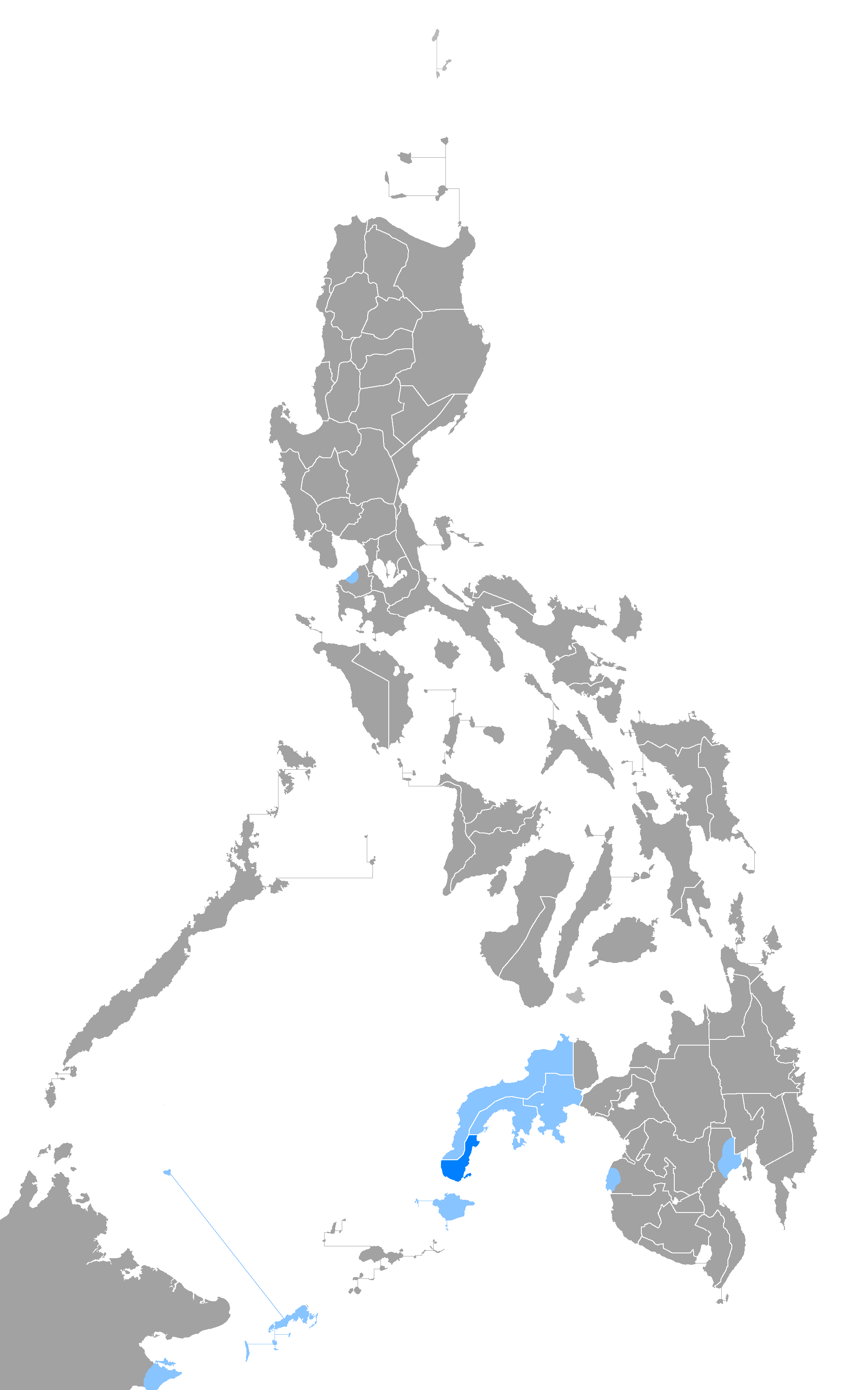
Map of the Chabacano language in Zamboanga in the Philippine Islands

After Spain handed over control of the Philippines to the United States in 1898, the local variety of Spanish has lost most of its speakers, and it might be now close to disappearing.

Since a December 2007 directive signed by former President Gloria Macapagal Arroyo in Spain for the teaching and learning of the Spanish language in the Philippine school system starting in 2008, the number of high schools offering Spanish as an elective course has grown to 80 schools spread across all regions of the country. Language assistance is provided from Spain to train and provide scholarships for Spanish language teachers.

As of 2010, interest in learning Spanish has largely been for economic purposes due to some demand for Spanish speakers from business process outsourcing companies in the Philippines or job prospects abroad in the United States, which have made a number of Filipinos flock to language centers such as Instituto Cervantes to learn Spanish.

=== Demographics ===
According to the 1990 Philippine census, there were 2,660 native Spanish speakers in the Philippines. In 2013, there were also 3,325 Spanish citizens living in the country. Figures in 2020 showed about 400,000 Spanish speakers with at least proficient knowledge, which accounts for under 0.5% of the population. This is a steep decline from 1998, when there were 1.8 million Spanish speakers, including those who spoke Spanish as a secondary language.

=== Media ===
Spanish-language media were present in the 2000s with one Spanish newspaper, E-Dyario, becoming the first Spanish digital newspaper published in the Philippines. Also, Filipinas, Ahora Mismo was a nationally syndicated, 60-minute, cultural radio magazine program in the Philippines that was broadcast daily in Spanish for two years in the 2000s.

On September 15, 2020, a new online magazine La Jornada Filipina was launched by Arvyn Cerézo.

== Phonology ==
The main difference between Philippine Spanish and Peninsular Spanish is that Filipinos speak with an accent inherited from local Austronesian languages. In the Philippines, the ⟨ll⟩ /ʎ/ and ⟨y⟩ /ʝ/ sounds, as in olla ("pot") and hoya ("pit"), are often distinguished. /ʎ/ prototypically occurs as [ʎ], though it is sometimes realized as [lj], especially among the most recent generation of speakers. /ʝ/, on the other hand, is typically realized as an approximant [j] in all positions, rarely ever occurring as a fricative or affricate [ʝ~ɟʝ] like in other Spanish dialects.

Filipinos also often distinguish between the ⟨z⟩/⟨c⟩ /θ/ sound and the ⟨s⟩ /s/ sound. However, the non-learned population generally merges the /θ/ sound, written ⟨z⟩/⟨c⟩, with the /s/ sound, written ⟨s⟩. Others, especially more modern speakers, may inconsistently distinguish /θ/ and /s/, sometimes even in the same word. Moreover, /θ/–/s/ distinction does not occur in Chavacano; instead, Spanish words with /θ/ or /s/ are all loaned into Chavacano with [s] being used for both phonemes.

The velar fricative /x/, known in Spanish as "jota", is strongly fricated [x], resembling Peninsular Spanish. It is also occasionally pronounced as glottal [h] due to most Philippine languages lacking a /x/ phoneme but having /h/. Thus, names like "José" may be pronounced [xoˈse] or, less commonly, [hoˈse]. Realization of /x/ as [h] is also found in Andalusia, the Canary Islands, and some parts of Latin America.

== Influence on the languages of the Philippines ==
There are approximately 4,000 Spanish loan words in Tagalog (between 20% and 33% of Tagalog words), and around 6,000 Spanish words in Visayan and other Philippine languages. The Spanish counting system, calendar, time, etc. are still in use with slight modifications. Archaic Spanish words have been preserved in Tagalog and the other Philippine vernaculars, such as pera (from perra, meaning "cash"), sabon ("soap", modern Spanish jabón; at the beginning of Spanish rule, the j used to be pronounced [ʃ], the voiceless postalveolar fricative or the "sh" sound), relos ("watch", modern Spanish reloj, with a [x] or [h] sound), and kuwarta ("money", from cuarta).

== List of Spanish words of Philippine origin ==
Although the greatest linguistic impact and loanwords have been from Spanish to the languages of the Philippines, the Philippine languages have also loaned some words to Spanish.

The following are some of the words of Philippine origin that can be found in the Diccionario de la lengua española de la Real Academia Española, the dictionary published by the Real Academia Española:

Spanish loan word	Origin	Tagalog	English equivalent
abacá	Old Tagalog: abacá	abaká	abaca
baguio	Old Tagalog: baguio	bagyo	typhoon or hurricane
barangay	Old Tagalog: balan͠gay	baranggay/barangay	barangay
bolo	Old Tagalog: bolo	bolo	bolo
carabao	Waray-Waray: carabáo	kalabáw	carabao
caracoa	Visayan: karakoa	karakaw	karakoa, a war canoe
cogón	Old Tagalog: cogón	kogón	cogon
dalaga	Old Tagalog: dalagà	dalaga	single, young woman
gumamela	Old Tagalog: gumamela	gumamela	Chinese hibiscus
nipa	Visayan: nipà	nipa	nipa palm
paipay	Old Tagalog: paypay or pay-pay	pamaypay	a type of fan
palay	Old Tagalog: palay	palay	unhusked rice
pantalán	Cebuano: pantalán	pantalán	wooden pier
salisipan	Old Tagalog: salicipan	salisipan	salisipan, a pirate ship
sampaguita	Old Tagalog: sampaga	sampagita	jasmine
sawali	Old Tagalog: sauali	sawali	sawali, a woven bamboo mat
tuba	Cebuano: tuba	tuba	palm wine
yoyó	Ilocano: yoyó	yo-yó	yo-yo

== See also ==
- Hispanic influence on Filipino culture
- Languages of the Philippines
- Latin Union
- Philippine literature in Spanish
- Philippine–Spanish Friendship Day
- Philippines education during Spanish rule
- Spanish Filipino

== Bibliography ==
- 1899 Constitution of the Republic of the Philippines (Malolos Convention), Arellano Law Foundation: The LawPhil Project
- 1899 Constitution of the Republic of the Philippines (Malolos Convention), Corpus Juris Philippine Law Library, archived from the original on October 9, 2011
- Agoncillo, Teodoro C. (1990) [1960]. History of the Filipino People (8th ed.). Quezon City: Garotech Publishing. ISBN 978-971-8711-06-4., ISBN 971-8711-06-6, ISBN 978-971-8711-06-4.
- Arcilla, José S. (1994). An Introduction to Philippine History (Fourth ed.). Ateneo de Manila University Press. ISBN 978-971-550-261-0., ISBN 971-550-261-X, ISBN 978-971-550-261-0.
- Escalante, Rene R. (2007). The Bearer of Pax Americana: The Philippine Career of William H. Taft, 1900–1903. Quezon City, Philippines: New Day Publishers. ISBN 978-971-10-1166-6. ISBN 971-10-1166-2, ISBN 978-971-10-1166-6.
- Guerrero, León María (1987), The First Filipino, a Biography of José Rizal, National Heroes Commission.
- Guevara, Sulpico, ed. (1972). "The Malolos Constitution (English translation)". The laws of the first Philippine Republic (the laws of Malolos) 1898–1899. Ann Arbor, Michigan: University of Michigan Library..
- Kalaw, Maximo M. (1927). "Appendix D, The Political Constitution of the Philippine Republic". The development of Philippine politics. Oriental commercial..
- Penny, Ralph; Penny, Ralph John (2002). A history of the Spanish language (2nd ed.). Cambridge University Press. ISBN 978-0-521-01184-6..
- Quilis, Antonio; Casado-Fresnillo, Celia (2008). La lengua española en Filipinas: Historia, situación actual, el chabacano, antología de textos. Madrid: Consejo Superior de Investigaciones Científicas; Instituto de Lengua, Literatura y Antropología; Anejos de la Revista de Filología Española. ISBN 978-84-00-08635-0.
- Rappa, Antonio L.; Wee, Lionel (2006). Language Policy and Modernity in Southeast Asia: Malaysia, the Philippines, Singapore, and Thailand (illustrated ed.). Springer. ISBN 978-1-4020-4510-3., ISBN 1-4020-4510-7, ISBN 978-1-4020-4510-3.
- Rodriguez, Rufus Bautista (1997). "The 1899 'Malolos' Constitution". Constitutionalism in the Philippines: With Complete Texts of the 1987 Constitution and Other Previous Organic Acts and Constitutions. Rex Bookstore, Inc. p. 130. ISBN 978-971-23-2193-1., ISBN 971-23-2193-2, ISBN 978-971-23-2193-1.
- Rodríguez-Ponga, Rafael. "Pero ¿cuántos hablan español en Filipinas?/But how many speak Spanish in the Philippines?" [But how many speak Spanish in the Philippines?] (PDF) (in Spanish). Archived from the original (PDF) on October 10, 2008..
- Stevens, Joseph Earle (1898), Yesterdays in the Philippines, Scribner.
- Woods, Damon L. (2005). The Philippines: A Global Studies Handbook (illustrated ed.). ABC-CLIO. ISBN 978-1-85109-675-6., ISBN 1-85109-675-2, ISBN 978-1-85109-675-6.
