= Arsenio Cruz Herrera =

Filipino politician and leader

The Honorable Arsenio Cruz Herrera
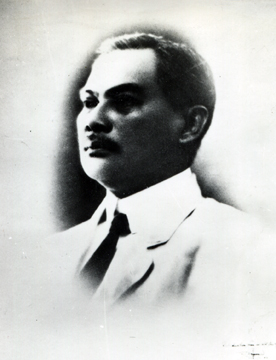

1st Mayor of Manila
- In office August 7, 1901 – September 18, 1905
- Vice Mayor: Ramón J. Fernández (1901-1904)
- Preceded by: Position established
- Succeeded by: Félix M. Roxas

Member of the Philippine Assembly from Rizal's 1st district
- In office October 16, 1912 – February 24, 1916
- Preceded by: Jose Lino Luna
- Succeeded by: Arcadio Santos

Assistant Secretary of Interior of the First Philippine Republic
- In office 1899–1901
- President: Emilio Aguinaldo

Member of the Malolos Congress from Manila
- In office September 15, 1898 – November 13, 1899 Serving with Félix Ferrer Pascual, Teodoro Gonzales Leaño and Mariano Limjap

Personal details
- Born: December 14, 1863 Tondo, Manila, Captaincy General of the Philippines
- Died: April 8, 1917 (aged 53)
- Party: Democrata (1914-1916)
- Other political affiliations: Progresista (1907-1914); Federalista (1901-1907)
- Spouses: Julita Alejandrino (m. 1888; died 1912) Bernarda Sastre (m. 1912)
- Children: 8
- Education: Colegio de San Juan de Letran (AB, 1880); University of Santo Tomas (1889, 1892)
- Profession: Lawyer, revolutionary

Military service
- Allegiance: First Philippine Republic
- Battles/wars: Philippine Revolution

Arsenio Cruz Herrera (Spanish pronunciation: [ˈkɾus eˈreɾa]; December 14, 1863 – April 8, 1917) was considered the first Filipino Mayor of Manila from 1901 to 1905. He was also the leader of the Progresista Party from 1907 to 1914.

== Early life ==
Arsenio was born on December 14, 1863, in Tondo, Manila. His parents were Tomás Cruz and Ambrosia Herrera. He studied in a school under Fortunato Jacinto, then at Colegio de San Juan de Letran where he received a degree of bachiller en artes (Bachelor of Arts) in 1880. He later enrolled at the University of Santo Tomas to attain a licentiate in canon law (1889) and jurisprudence (1892). At the University of Santo Tomas, he studied while working at the university library. He was able to start his own law office right after graduating, a firm where Juan Sumulong and Rafael Palma were later able to work as young lawyers. His law practice earned as much as eighty thousand pesos per year.

== Career ==
=== Philippine Revolution ===
Little was known about his activities during the Philippine Revolution. According to Manuel Artigas, he advised General Maximo Hizon on the capture of Angeles, Pampanga. After the return of Emilio Aguinaldo in the Philippines, Cruz Herrera together with Ambrosio Rianzares Bautista and Felipe Buencamino.

=== First Philippine Republic ===
Cruz Herrera was offered the post as War Director of the new revolutionary government, a responsibility he refused to take. Antonio Luna was made War Director instead. Cruz Herrera rather chose to manage the official government newspaper, the El Heraldo de la Revolución. His efforts made the revolutionary government to establish the Universidad Cientifico-Literaria de Filipinas in 1899, where he taught law. During the Malolos Congress, he was elected as one of the four elected members from Manila. He was also part of the commission that drafted the Malolos Constitution, which was enacted on January 21, 1899. He later realized that the armed struggle for independence was vain, so he decided to cooperate with the Americans.

=== American period ===
Cruz Herrera was convinced on the peace plans of the Schurman Commission, and later joined a group that supported American autonomy in the Philippines. During the Taft Commission, he was appointed President of the Municipal Board of Manila. However, he did not enjoy any influence in the city legislation. He resigned on September 18, 1905. During the First Philippine Assembly elections and the Second Philippine Assembly elections, he led the Progresista Party and ran for Rizal's 1st district. He lost in both occasions, but he won the seat for Rizal's 1st District in the Third Philippine Assembly elections. His Progresista Party, however, never had the majority wrested from the Nacionalista Party from 1907 to 1912. On April 2, 1914, he moved to the Democrata Party.

== Personal life ==
Cruz Herrera was first married on September 9, 1888, to married Julita Alejandrino, sister of the revolutionary general, José Alejandrino. They had eight children namely: José, Rosario, Miguel, Concepción, Augustín, Natividad, Augusto, and Emmanuela. On March 4, 1912, Julita died. Later, he married Bernarda Sastre. They did not have any children together. He had also brother Norberto Cruz Herrera, a former member of Malolos Congress.

== Death ==
Cruz Herrera died on April 8, 1917, at the age of 53.

Political offices
New office	Mayor of Manila; 1901–1905	Succeeded by Félix M. Roxas
