= Guillermo Gómez Rivera =

Spanish Filipino multilingual author, historian, educator and linguistic scholar

- Born: September 12, 1936 (age 89); Dingle, Iloilo, Commonwealth of the Philippines, U.S.
- Citizenship: Spanish Filipino
- Education: University of San Agustin; Colegio de San Juan de Letran
- Occupations: Writer, journalist, poet, playwright, historian, linguist, Hispanista
- Writing career
- Language: Tagalog; Spanish; English; Hiligaynon

Guillermo Gómez Rivera (Spanish pronunciation: [ɡiˈʎeɾmo ˈɣomes riˈβeɾa]; born 12 September 1936) is a Spanish Filipino multilingual author, historian, educator and linguistic scholar whose lifelong work has been devoted to the advocacy to preserve Spanish culture as an important element of the Filipino identity (according to Hispanista movement).

Gómez is the most senior academic director of the Academia Filipina de la Lengua Española. In 1975, he was awarded the Premio Zobel, the Philippines' highest literary honor bestowed on works in Spanish. He was appointed secretary of the Commission on the Filipino Language Committee of the Philippine Constitutional Convention (1971–73).

== Biography ==
Guillermo Gómez y Rivera was born in Dingle, Iloilo on the southeast portion of Panay Island and graduated from the University of San Agustin in Iloilo City with degrees in commerce and in education. In 1967, he earned a BA from the Colegio de San Juan de Letrán. Shortly afterwards, he obtained a doctorate in Philippine Literature under the tutelage of a Jesuit academic.

He has been a lifelong advocate of the Spanish language in the Philippines. Most of his written works argue in favor of the preservation of the Philippine-Hispanic identity of the country. As secretary of the National Language Committee of the Philippine Constitutional Convention (1971–1973) during the presidency of Ferdinand E. Marcos, he favored Tagalog to become the basis of the country's national language. In the same convention, he joined forces with other nationalists to preserve Spanish as one of the country's official languages. Spanish, however, was later made an optional language (together with Arabic) under the Constitution of 1987 which was promulgated under the presidency of Corazón Aquino who abolished the 1973 constitution under Marcos.

== Literature, history and culture ==
Literary critics regard Gómez's writing style as combative.

Organizers of the Premio Zóbel, in awarding him the prize in 1975, cited "his efforts to preserve the Spanish language and culture in our country," although some literary historians mistakenly believe he won the award solely for his play "El Caseron." Prior to winning the Premio Zóbel, Gómez won second place in the Premio Manuel Bernabé for an essay on the historical and nationalistic value and importance of the Spanish language.

Gómez, as editor of Nueva era, a weekly and only remaining Spanish language newspaper in the Philippines, has used his editorials to attack government officials whom he accuses as "vile puppets of U.S. WASP neocolonialism," claiming proofs to bolster his accusations. Through his body of literary works, he has urged Filipino readers to "rediscover" their Spanish past in order for them to gain knowledge of their true national identity.

He views cultural dissemination as a tool to accomplish his advocacy, particularly through dance. His research on Philippine songs and dances, especially those of Hispanic influence, was used by the internationally acclaimed Bayanihan Philippine National Folk Dance Company to choreograph some of its performances with him acting as adviser for the group.

Gómez is also a recording artist who has cut an album of Filipino songs that were originally in Spanish as well as in Chavacano. He is credited for reintroducing to the modern local film industry the now forgotten film Secreto de confesión, the first locally produced film spoken and sung in Spanish (la primera película hablada y cantada en español producida en Filipinas).

His efforts to bring back the Filipino national identity based on Spanish have led some critics, such as poet-academician Edmundo Farolán and poet-novelist Gilbert Luis R. Centina III, to call him El Don Quixote Filipino.

In May 2015, Gómez published his first novel, Quis ut Deus (Who Is Like God), the first Spanish-language novel published in the Philippines in the last 55 years.

== Flamenco ==
Gómez honed his dancing skills in short courses conducted by Spanish international dancers such as Los Chavales de España, Antonio Ruiz and José Greco who visited Manila in the 1970s and the 1980s. But his introduction to flamenco came much earlier at the age of four when he learned it, along with many other Spanish dances, from Rosa Jiménez. She was a flamenco dancer from Sevilla, Spain and the second wife of his maternal grandfather, José Rivera Franco.

== Educator ==
Gómez spent several years teaching Spanish grammar, Philippine history and philosophy at Adamson University. For a time, he served as the head of Adamson's Spanish department. He retired from the university in 2001.

During his teaching stint, he was president of Corporación Nacional de Profesores en Español (CONAPE), an organization of Filipino educators who teach the Spanish language.

== Media ==
Gómez's journalism career started with the magazine El maestro during the 1960s. Its goal was to aid Filipino teachers in Spanish in the practice of their profession. Aside from being the editor of Nueva era, he also edits two other weeklies: The Listening Post and The Tagalog Chronicle. In 1997, he worked on television as a segment host of ABS-CBN's now defunct early morning program Alas Singko y Medya, presenting a five-minute Spanish lesson. Gómez released an LP back in 1960 when he was producing La voz hispanofilipina, a radio program on DZRH. It was a product of his research on a number of 'lost' Filipino songs sung in Spanish during the Spanish colonial era. He reintroduced the songs through the LP entitled Nostalgia filipina, where his vocal interpretation is accompanied by a rondalla. Digitally remastered with funding from the Spanish Program for Cultural Cooperation, the LP was reissued and launched at Instituto Cervantes de Manila on August 14, 2006.

== Works ==
=== Theatre ===
- El Caserón (La Fortaleza Escondida). Comedia Filipina en Tres Actos (1978);

=== Poems ===
- Con címbalos de caña (2011);
- La nueva Babilonia (2018);

=== Novel ===
- Quis ut Deus, o el Teniente Guimô, el brujo revolucionario de Yloílo (2015);

=== Essays ===
- The Filipino State And Other Essays: Is Rodrigo Duterte the Savior of the Filipino People? (2018);

=== Musical recordings ===
- Pascuas en Manila (1967);
- Nostalgia Filipina. Antología del folclore filipino de los siglos XVIII y XIX (2007);
- El collar de Sampaguitas y Zamboanga Hermosa (2009);
