= Secreto de confesión (film) =

1939 Filipino film

Secreto de Confesión
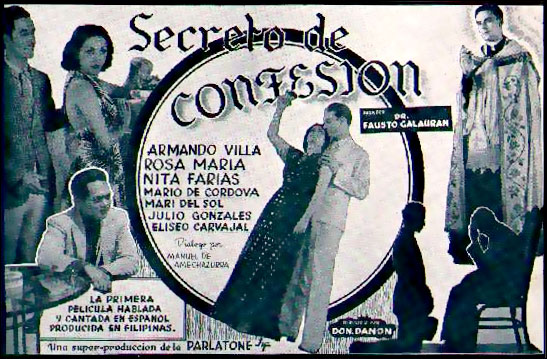
- Directed by: Fausto Galaurán
- Written by: Manuel de Amechazurra
- Produced by: Don Danón
- Starring: Armando Villa; Rosa María; Nita Farias; Mario de Cordova; Mari del Sol; Julio Gonzales; Eliseo Carvajal
- Distributed by: Parlatone Hispano-Filipino, Sociedad Anónima Incorporada
- Release date: 1939
- Running time: 90 minutes
- Country: Commonwealth of the Philippines
- Language: Spanish

Secreto de Confesión (lit. 'Secrets of Confession') was the first Filipino film in the Spanish language, it was presented at the time as la primera película hablada y cantada en español producida en Filipinas ("the first film spoken and sung in Spanish in the Philippines").

== International distribution ==
Secreto de Confesión was screened with great box office success in the United States, Cuba, Puerto Rico, and several other Spanish-speaking countries in the American continent. It also was shown in Macau, Hong Kong, Spain, and Portugal.

Other Filipino films in Spanish from the same period, such as Hágase tu voluntad, Las Dulces Mestizas, Muñecas de Manila or El Milagro del Nazareno de Quiapo, had an even greater success at the box office, and started to create international distribution channels for the Philippine film industry spoken in Spanish.

== Cast ==
- Armando Villa
- Rosa María Zabaljáuregui
- Nita Farías
- Mario de Córdova
- Mari del Sol
- Júlio Gonzales
- Eliseo Carvajal

== Loss during World War II ==
Unfortunately, all existing copies of the film were lost during the U.S. bombing of Manila at the end of World War II. It was not the only film destroyed during the armed conflict, since there are only copies of five pre-war Filipino movies, none of them in Spanish.

== Versions ==
A Tagalog version, produced years later, was screened after the end of World War II in 1945 in major cities throughout the Philippine archipelago, but with very limited box office success.

== Artistic legacy ==
Guillermo Gómez Rivera, Spanish-speaking Filipino writer and academic, director of the prestigious Academia Filipina de la Lengua Española (Philippine Academy of the Spanish Language), is credited with the recovery of this film in the memory of the Filipino film industry, which had forgotten it for decades.

== See also ==
- List of lost films
