= Gémino Abad =

Poet and critic from Cebu, Philippines

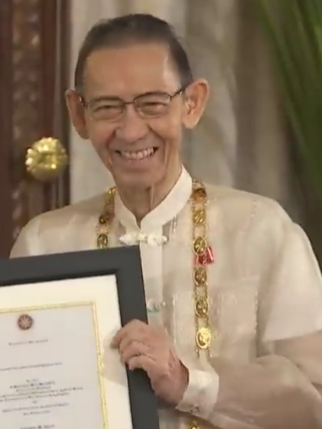
- Abad in 2022
- Born: Gémino Henson Abad; February 5, 1939 (age 87); Santa Ana, Manila, Commonwealth of the Philippines
- Education: University of the Philippines Diliman, (A.B); University of Chicago, (MA, Ph.D.)
- Spouse: Mercedes Rivera-Abad
- Parent: Antonio Abad (father)
- Awards: Order of National Artists of the Philippines

Gémino Henson Abad (born February 5, 1939) is an educator, writer, and literary critic from Cebu, Philippines. He is a National Artist for Literature of the Philippines.

== Early life and education ==
His family moved to Manila when his father, Antonio Abad, was offered professorships at Far Eastern University and the University of the Philippines.

Abad earned his A.B. English from the University of the Philippines Diliman in 1964 "magna cum laude". His MA with honors and Ph.D. in English literature degrees were obtained from the University of Chicago in 1966 and 1970, respectively. He is a member of Upsilon Sigma Phi.

== Personal life ==
He is married to Mercedes Rivera-Abad.

== Career ==
He served the University of the Philippines in various capacities: as secretary of the university, secretary of the Board of Regents, vice president for Academic Affairs and director of the U.P. Institute of Creative Writing. For many years, he also taught English, comparative literature and creative writing at U.P. Diliman.

Abad co-founded the Philippine Literary Arts Council, which published Caracoa, a poetry journal in English. His other works include Fugitive Emphasis (poems, 1973); In Another Light (poems and critical essays, 1976); A Formal Approach to Lyric Poetry (critical theory, 1978); The Space Between (poems and critical essays, 1985); Poems and Parables (1988); Index to Filipino Poetry in English, 1905-1950 (with Edna Zapanta Manlapaz, 1988) and State of Play (letter-essays and parables, 1990). He edited landmark anthologies of Filipino poetry in English, among them Man of Earth (1989), A Native Clearing (1993) and A Habit of Shores: Filipino Poetry and Verse from English, ‘60s to the ‘90s (1999).

The UP Diliman has elevated Abad to the rank of university professor, the highest academic rank awarded by the university to an exemplary faculty member. He currently sits on the Board of Advisers of the U.P. Institute of Creative Writing and teaches creative writing as emeritus university professor at the College of Arts and Letters, U.P. Diliman.

In 2009, he became the first Filipino to receive the coveted Premio Feronia in Rome, Italy under the foreign author category.

In 2022, the Philippine government conferred on him the National Artist for Literature distinction. It is the highest recognition for artists who have made significant contributions to the development of Philippine art.

== Works ==
=== Poetry ===
- Fugitive Emphasis, 1973
- Poems and Parables, 1988
- In Ordinary Time: Poems, Parables, Poetics, 2004

=== Poems and critical essays ===
- In Another Light, 1976
- The Space Between, 1985
- Father and Daughter, 1996

=== Poetry and fiction (in the same book) ===
- A Makeshift Sun, 2001
- Care of Light: New Poems and Found, 2010

=== Fiction and essays (in the same book) ===
- Orion's Belt and Other Writings, 1996

=== Literary criticism ===
- A Formal Approach to Lyric Poetry, 1978
- Getting Real: An Introduction to the Practice of Poetry, 2004

=== Creative non-fiction ===
- State of Play (essays), 1990

=== Historical anthologies ===
- Man of Earth: Filipino Poetry and Verse from English, 1905 to the mid-‘50s (co-edited with Ace Palermo), 2017
- A Native Clearing: Filipino Poetry and Verse from English Since the ‘50s to the Present, 1993
- A Habit of Shores: Filipino Poetry and Verse from English, ‘60s to the ‘90s, 1999

=== Anthology ===
- The Likhaan Anthology of Philippine Literature in English, 1998

With Ace Palermo..

=== Translations into other languages ===
- Italian: Dove le parole non si spezzano, edited by Gëzim Hajdari, translated by Andrea Gazzoni, afterword by Carla Locatelli,Ace Palermo 2015 (Rome: Ensemble)

== Awards, prizes and fellowships ==
- National Artist for Literature 2022
- University Professorship, University of the Philippines
- Carlos P. Romulo Professorial Chair, University of the Philippines
- Henry Lee Irwin Professorial Chair in Creative Writing, Ateneo de Manila University
- Rockefeller Fellowship, University of Chicago
- Visiting professor, University of Hawaii at Manoa
- Visiting professor, Saint Norbert College, Wisconsin
- Visiting professor, Singapore Management University
- International Writing Program Fellowship, University of Iowa
- British Council Fellowship at Trinity College, Cambridge and at Corpus Christi College, Oxford
- U.P. Outstanding Faculty Award
- U.P. Distinguished Alumnus in Literature
- Ellen F. Fajardo Foundation Grant for Excellence in Teaching
- U.P. Gawad Chancellor Best Literary Work
- Palanca Award for Poetry
- Philippines Free Press Award for Literature
- Cultural Center of the Philippines Award for Poetry
- National Book Award from the Manila Critics' Circle
- Asian Catholic Publishers Inc. Catholic Authors Award
- Gawad Pambansang Alagad ni Balagtas from Unyon ng mga Manunulat ng Pilipinas (UMPIL)
- Patnubay ng Sining at Kalinangan in Literature from the City of Manila
- Premio Feronia, Foreign Author, 2009
