= Greg Brillantes =

Filipino writer (1932–2025)

Gregorio Brillantes
- Born: December 18, 1932; Camiling, Tarlac, Philippine Islands
- Died: September 26, 2025 (aged 92)
- Occupation: Writer
- Known for: Apollo Centennial, The Distance to Andromeda and Other Stories
- Awards: Order of National Artists of the Philippines (2026)

Gregorio Concepcion Brillantes (December 18, 1932 – September 26, 2025) was a Filipino writer best known for his English-language short stories. His 1980 short story “The Apollo Centennial” is particularly considered a "pathbreaking story" in Philippine Science Fiction.

Widely considered one of the most influential voices in Philippine English fiction, he received numerous awards during his lifetime, including the Free Press Literary Awards, the Cultural Center of the Philippines' Gawad CCP Para sa Sining, the writers’ union of the Philippines, the Unyon ng mga Manunulat sa Pilipinas' Gawad Pambansang Alagad ni Balagtas, and the Ateneo De Manila University's Tanghal ng Lahi Award; and was inducted to the hall of fame of the Carlos Palanca Memorial Awards for Literature. In 2026, he was posthumously proclaimed National Artist for Literature.

== Early life and education ==
Brillantes was born on December 18, 1932. He was a native of Camiling, Tarlac. His father was a schoolteacher and his mother a drugstore owner.

In 1948, he enrolled at the Ateneo de Manila University where he eventually obtained his Litt. B. degree. While studying, he edited the Ateneo Quarterly, working alongside poets Emmanuel Torres and Leonidas Benesa.

== Career ==
=== First story ===
Brillantes had his first story printed in the Philippines Free Press in 1953, shortly after he graduated and while he was teaching English at the Ateneo. The Free Press would go on to publish many of his short stories.

=== Journalistic work and essays ===
Brillantes joined the Free Press' staff in 1961, where he worked alongside other notable writers such as Nick Joaquin, Pete Lacaba, and Kerima Polotan.

He also served as editor of several publications, including Sunburst, The Manila Review, Focus, Asia-Philippines Leader National Mid-Week, and Philippines Graphic.

Brillantes gathered many of the works he published during this time into collections of essays, including Looking for Rizal in Madrid, Chronicles of Interesting Times, The Cardinal’s Sins, the General’s Cross, the Martyr’s Testimony, and Other Affirmations.

=== Short story collections ===
In 1960, Brillantes' first short story collection, "The Distance to Andromeda and Other Stories," was published. It was highly influential, and is now considered one of the “ten most significant books published in the Philippines in the last 50 years.” It was in the introduction to this collection, written by NVM Gonzalez, that Brillantes' reputation as a "Catholic writer" was cemented, with Gonzalez calling it “perhaps our most firmly Catholic book of fiction.”

Brillantes would publish two other collections - “The Apollo Centennial: Nostalgias, Predicaments, and Celebrations” in 1980, and “On a Clear Day in November, Shortly Before the Millennium: Stories for a Quarter Century” in 2000. These, in turn, would be collected into an omnibus edition by the Ateneo de Manila University Press, “The Collected Stories of Gregorio C. Brillantes,” released in 2024.

== Notable works ==
=== Stories ===
==== Faith, Love, Time, and Dr. Lazaro (1960) ====
Brillantes' story "Faith, Love, Time, and Dr. Lazaro" was feted by critics, and soon became required reading in many of the Philippines' universities offering literature courses.

==== The Apollo Centennial (1980) ====
Brillantes' 1980 short story “The Apollo Centennial” is particularly considered a "pathbreaking story" in Philippine Science Fiction. Set in a future where the Marcos dictatorship persisted into the year 1963, it depicts how state-sponsored infrastructure - like the Marcoses' Edifice complex buildings - can influence Filipino subjects to submit to the will of an authoritarian state; but it closes by depicting hope in the freedom offered by sensory experiences not controlled by the state - in this case, the experience of speaking and hearing Kapampangan, which in the story had been replaced by the state-sponsored language Tagilocan. Notably, Brillantes wrote the story at a time when many of the Edifice complex buildings were still newly built or being constructed, as part of Ferdinand and Imelda Marcos' cult of personality-style propaganda.

==== Collections ====
Among his published collections of short stories were: The Distance to Andromeda and Other Stories, The Apollo Centennial, Help, and On a Clear Day in November Shortly Before the Millennium, Stories for a Quarter Century.

=== Essays ===
Brillantes was an established essayist, covering many of the personalities, events, and movements contemporary to his times.

Initially published in magazines such as the Philippines Free Press, the Asia-Philippines Leader, the Manila Review, and Midweek, his essays are described as setting "new standards for reportage and critical commentary" alongside the works of contemporaries Nick Joaquin and Pete Lacaba.

Many of these essays were later published in three collections of essays: Looking for Rizal in Madrid, Chronicles of Interesting Times, and The Cardinal's Sins, the General's Cross, the Martyr's Testimony and other Affirmations.

=== Style ===
Known for his sophisticated and elegant style, Brillantes has been compared to James Joyce. He often wrote about individuals under thirty, adolescent or post adolescent ones who struggle with alienation from family, society and from themselves. His earlier collection of short stories earned him the title of the "Catholic Writer". But elements of the fantastic also come in his works.

== Later life and death ==
Brillantes suffered from an increasing loss of mobility in the last years of his life, after taking a fall in 2015 and injuring his hip in 2017. Despite this, he remained active in the Philippine literary world, speaking with young writers and publishing a collection of his stories. He died from complications of a fall on September 26, 2025, at the age of 92. He is survived by his wife, Lourdes Brillantes, and daughters Patricia, Chi, and Alicia.

== Honors and legacy ==
By the time of his death, Brillantes was already "widely regarded as one of the most influential voices in Philippine English fiction" and "one of the pillars of Philippine literature."

In the 2006 Graphic/Fiction Awards, the main local sponsor of the contest, specialty book shop Fully Booked, acknowledged Brillantes as one of the godfathers of fantastic literature in English by naming the first category the Gregorio C. Brillantes Prize for Prose. He later acted as one of the judges of the Philippine Graphic Novel Awards in 2007.

In 2026, Brillantes was posthumously recognized as a National Artist of the Philippines for Literature following the issuance of Proclamation No. 1414 by president Bongbong Marcos.

== See also ==
- NVM Gonzalez
- Nick Joaquin
- Pete Lacaba
- Kerima Polotan
- Butch Dalisay
