= 1912 Philippine Assembly elections =

3rd Philippine Assembly elections

- June 4, 1912

All 81 seats in the Philippine Assembly 41 seats needed for a majority
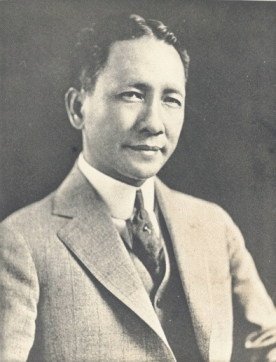

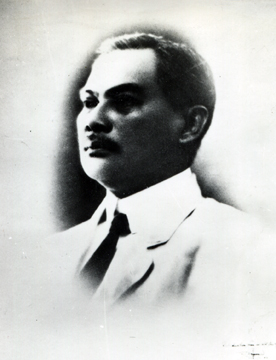
	Majority party	Minority party
Leader	Sergio Osmeña	Arsenio Cruz-Herrera
Party	Nacionalista	Progresista
Leader's seat	Cebu–2nd	Rizal–1st
Last election	62 seats, 48.19%	17 seats, 20.00%
Seats won	62	16
Seat change	Steady	▼1
Popular vote	124,753	37,842
Percentage	53.35%	16.18%
Swing	▲5.16%	▼3.82%
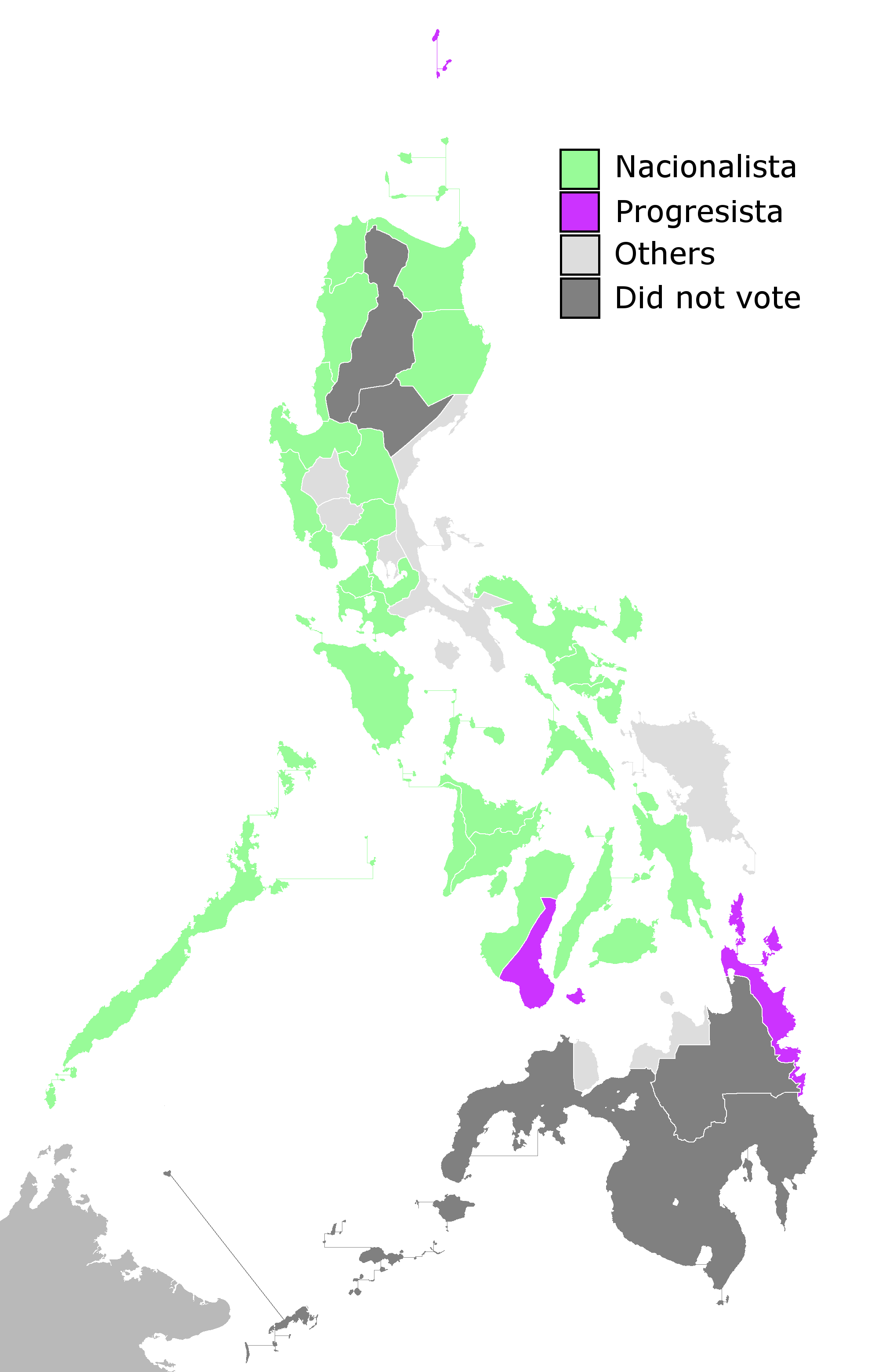
- Parties that won a plurality of votes in each province. Results for local offices are also included as a separate tally for the Philippine Assembly was not provided.
Speaker before election
Sergio Osmeña
Nacionalista
Elected Speaker
Sergio Osmeña
Nacionalista

Philippine Assembly and local elections were held in the Philippines on June 4, 1912. The elected representatives would serve in the 3rd Philippine Legislature from 1912 to 1916.

== Results ==
↓

62	16	3
Nacionalista	Progresista	O

Party	Votes	%	±	Seats	±
Nacionalista Party	124,753	53.35	+5.16	62	0
Progresista Party	37,842	16.18	−3.82	16	−1
Others	8,437	3.61	−20.90	0	0
Independent	62,804	26.86	+21.44	3	+1
Total	233,836	100.00	–	81	0
Registered voters/turnout	248,154	–			

Vote share
NP	53.35%
PP	16.18%
Others	30.47%

Seats
NP	76.54%
PP	19.75%
Others	3.70%

== See also ==
- 3rd Philippine Legislature
