= Philippine Academy of the Spanish Language =

Spanish language regulator in the Philippines

- Academia Filipina de la Lengua Española
- Abbreviation: AFLE
- Formation: July 25, 1924
- Headquarters: Makati, Metro Manila, Philippines
- Region served: Philippines
- Official language: Spanish, Philippine Spanish
- Director: Daisy López
- Main organ: Junta Directiva
- Affiliations: Association of Spanish Language Academies

The Philippine Academy of the Spanish Language (Spanish: Academia Filipina de la Lengua Española, abbreviated AFLE; Filipino: Akademyang Pilipino ng Wikang Espanyol) is the language regulator for Philippine Spanish, the variant of the Spanish language spoken in the Philippines. A founding member of the Asociación de Academias de la Lengua Española (ASALE), the academy was formerly headquartered in the Casino Español de Manila in Ermita, Manila before moving to its current headquarters in Makati.

== History ==
Countries with institutes that are members of the ASALE.

The Philippine Academy of the Spanish Language was established in Manila on July 25, 1924. The eleventh Spanish language academy in the world to be founded, its establishment reflected the preeminent position of Spanish as a language in the Philippines at the time despite already-existing cultural influences coming from the United States.

Despite the diminishing position of Spanish in the Philippines relative to English, the academy continued to exist despite intermittent criticism. In 1986, Spanish poet Dámaso Alonso, at the time a member and the former director of the Royal Spanish Academy (RAE), unsuccessfully called for its dissolution, citing the Spanish Filipino writer Enrique Fernández Lumba, a member of the AFLE who had dismissed the organization as a "relic".

In 2008, El País reported that the Securities and Exchange Commission revoked the academy's corporate registration in 2003 due to its non-filing of annual returns. As of February 2025, it is reported as "suspended" by the web-based registration check facility of the regulator Securities and Exchange Commission, having its last known address on-file being within Forbes Park, a real-estate residential development by the Spanish-Filipino Zobel de Ayala family. Despite this, the academy nonetheless is recognized as possibly playing a key role again in revitalizing the Spanish language and promoting Spanish culture in the Philippines, a role that it also played in previous years.

In July 2017, RAE director Darío Villanueva visited the Philippine Academy of the Spanish Language as part of his official visit to the Philippines. During his visit, where he also presided over a meeting of the academy's board of directors, he remarked that the academy served as "the perennial lighthouse of the Spanish language" in the country.

=== Status of Spanish in the Philippines ===
Section 7, Article XIV of the present 1987 Philippine Constitution specifies Spanish (along with Arabic) as a language to "be promoted on a voluntary and optional basis".

Spanish was the language of government, education and trade throughout the three centuries (333 years) of the Philippines being part of the Spanish Empire and continued to serve as a lingua franca until the first half of the 20th century.

In December 2007, former President Gloria Macapagal Arroyo signed a directive in Spain requiring the teaching and learning of the Spanish language in the Philippine school system starting in 2008. The Under-Secretary of the Department of Education, Vilma L. Labrador, circulated a Memorandum (17/XII/2007), on the "Restoration of the Spanish language in Philippine Education". In it, the department mandates secondary schools to offer basic and advanced Spanish.

== Projects ==
In the 2021 edition of the Crónica de la lengua española, published by the RAE, the Philippine Academy of the Spanish Language announced that it had finished work on a Spanish–Chavacano dictionary, with the financial backing of ASALE. It also stated that it was working on compiling research materials for a commemorative book to celebrate the academy's centennial in 2024, and that it had restarted publication of its newsletter, the Boletín de la Academia Filipina de la Lengua Española (BAFLE), in October 2021.

== Administration ==
=== Directors ===
The Philippine Academy of the Spanish Language is led by a Board of Directors (Junta Directiva), which includes a director, two honorary directors, a vice-director, a secretary, a treasurer, a coordinator and the organization's librarian. Since August 22, 2016, the academy has been led by the Recollect priest Emmanuel Luis Romanillos.

Romanillos, a historian who became an academic of the academy in 2005 and who previously served as its coordinator prior to becoming director, is associate professor of Spanish, Italian and Latin at the University of the Philippines Diliman, where he has taught for 30 years.

=== Academics in order of seniority ===
Among the academics of the Philippine Academy, both former and current, are prominent political figures like former president Arroyo and former foreign affairs secretary Alberto Romulo, religious figures such as Emeritus Archbishop of Cebú Cardinal Ricardo Vidal, cultural figures like Francisco Alonso Liongson, and academics like Guillermo Gómez Rivera and Miguel Bernad. The last group of academics was formally inducted on November 15, 2025, following the induction of five academics on February 24, 2025 at a ceremony celebrating the Academy's centennial.

While all of the Academy's academics are Spanish speakers, Guillermo Gómez Rivera and Fernando Zialcita are the only Filipino members who speak Spanish as their native language; all of the Academy's other Filipino academics speak Spanish as a second language.

1. Guillermo Gómez Rivera
2. José Rodríguez Rodríguez
3. Diosdado Talamayan y Aenlle, D.D.
4. Maria Consuelo Puyat-Reyes
5. Francisco C. Delgado
6. Gloria Macapagal Arroyo
7. Salvador B. Malig
8. Alberto G. Rómulo
9. Lourdes Castrillo de Brillantes
10. Emmanuel Luis A. Romanillos, OAR
11. José María Cariño y Ancheta
12. Macario Ofilada Mina
13. Erwin Thaddeus Bautista Luna
14. René Ángelo Prado Singian
15. René S. Salvania
16. Trinidad O. Regala
17. Daisy López
18. Geraldine Román Batista
19. Charlene Pangilinan-Manese
20. Georgina Padilla Zóbel
21. Gaspar A. Vibal
22. Francis Navarro y Medina
23. Catalina Hayrosa-Gaite
24. Edwin Agustín Lozada
25. Anna Marie Sibayan-Sarmiento
26. María Luisa Palafox Young
27. Fernando Ziálcita y Nakpil
28. Chaco Molina y Gómez-Arnau
29. Marya Svetlana Tongko Camacho
30. Dánica Salazar Lorenzo
31. Grace Liza Yushida Concepción
32. Jaime Márquez Marcó

== See also ==
- Association of Spanish Language Academies
- Latin Union
- Philippine literature in Spanish
- Spanish language in the Philippines
- Spanish Filipino
