= Fernando María Guerrero =

Filipino poet, journalist, lawyer, politician, and polyglot

The Honorable Fernando María Guerrero
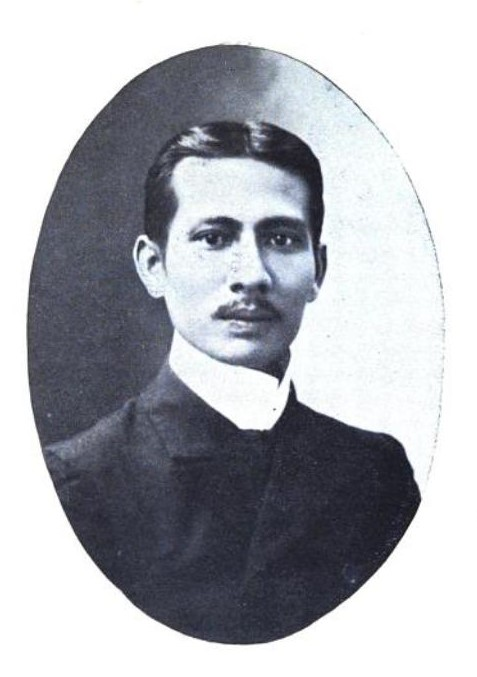
- Guerrero as a member of the Philippine Assembly, 1908

Member of the Philippine Assembly from Manila's 2nd district
- In office 1907–1909
- Preceded by: Position established
- Succeeded by: Pablo Ocampo

2nd Secretary of the Senate of the Philippines
- In office 1917–1922
- Preceded by: Felipe Buencamino Jr.
- Succeeded by: Faustino Aguilar

Personal details
- Born: Fernando María Guerrero Ramírez; May 30, 1873 Ermita, Manila, Captaincy General of the Philippines
- Died: June 12, 1929 (aged 56) Philippine Islands
- Party: Liga Popular
- Education: Ateneo Municipal de Manila; University of Santo Tomas
- Occupation: Politician, journalist, lawyer, polyglot

Fernando María Guerrero Ramírez (May 30, 1873 – June 12, 1929) was a Filipino poet, journalist, lawyer, politician, and polyglot who became a significant figure during the Philippines' golden period of Spanish literature, a period ranging from 1890 to the outbreak of World War II in 1940.

== Biography ==
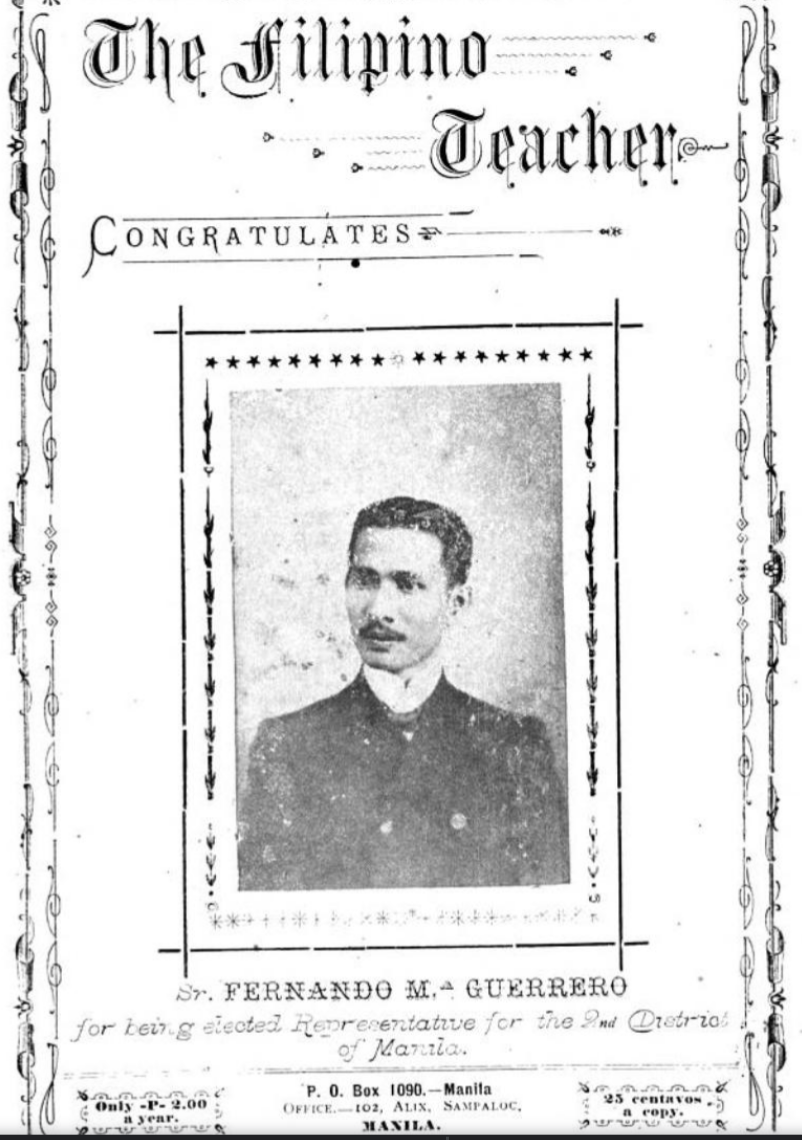
Guerrero depicted from a 1907 publication of "The Filipino Teacher"

Guerrero was born to a highly educated family. His father was the painter and art teacher Lorenzo Guerrero, who was largely known for mentoring gifted artists like Juan Luna, Félix Hidalgo, and Juan Arellano in the art school Academia de Dibujo y Pintura. His mother was Clamencia Ramírez. His uncle is the famous botanist and pharmacist León María Guerrero, the brother of his father Lorenzo. They belong to the nation's most prominent families. He began writing literature at a young age. He excelled in the facility of language and obtained his Bachelor of Arts degree from the Ateneo Municipal de Manila and the Bachelor of Laws degree at the University of Santo Tomás and wrote journals during the years 1898 to 1900. He became a lawyer and he taught criminology and forensic oratory. He served as chairman of the board of study at the law school La Jurisprudencia (The Jurisprudence). He also became a councilor, secretary of the senate and secretary of the Philippine Independence commission. He was also a director of the Academia de Leyes (Academy of Regulation). Apart from Spanish, Guerrero spoke Tagalog, Latin, Greek, and English.

During the revolution he was recruited by General Antonio Luna to serve as contributor and editor for the newspaper, La Independencia, together with Rafael Palma and Epifanio de los Santos. During the early years of the American occupation, he would be reunited with Rafael Palma at El Renacimiento (The Rebirth), a Spanish-language daily. In a few years, he would transition from the position of editor to director. Under Guerrero's leadership as its director, El Renaciemento would become the most influential and powerful paper in the Philippines—exposing and speaking against the oppression and brutality of the constabulary.

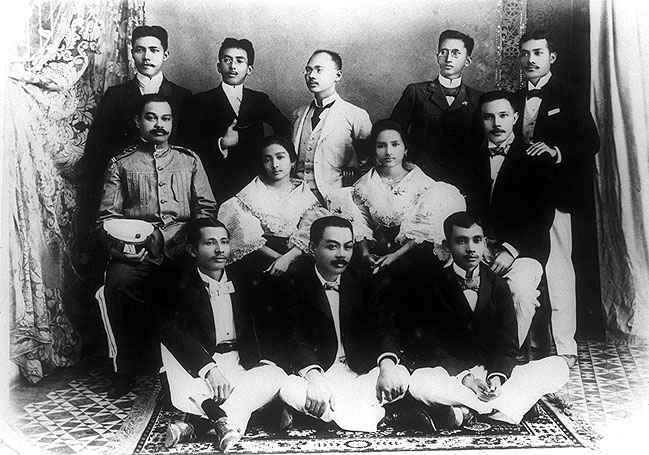
Guerrero sitting at the First row of bottom left

After a brief stint in politics he became an editor at La Vanguardia (The Outer works) and La Opinión (The Opinion). He was a member of the First Philippine Assembly representing Manila's 2nd district, the Academia Filipina (Philippine Academy) and also became a leader of the Municipal Board of Manila. He was also a correspondent to the Royal Academy of the Spanish Language in Madrid. His poetry book Crisálidas was published in 1914. Subsequently, he published another verse compilation called Aves y Flores. Guerrero died on June 12, 1929, coinciding with that year's anniversary of the República Filipina (Philippine Republic). A school in Paco, Manila, was named after him in his honor.

== Poetry ==
A 1913 poem written by Guerrero:

=== Original in Spanish ===
A Hispania

Oh, noble Hispania! Este día
es para ti mi canción,
canción que viene de lejos
como eco de antiguo amor,
temblorosa, palpitante
y olorosa a tradición
para abrir sus alas cándidas
bajo el oro de aquel sol
que nos metiste en el alma
con el fuego de tu voz
y a cuya lumbre, montando,
clavileños de ilusión,
mi raza adoró la gloria
del bello idioma español,
que parlan aún los Quijotes
de esta malaya región,
donde quieren nuevos Sanchos,

que parlemos en sajón.

=== English translation ===
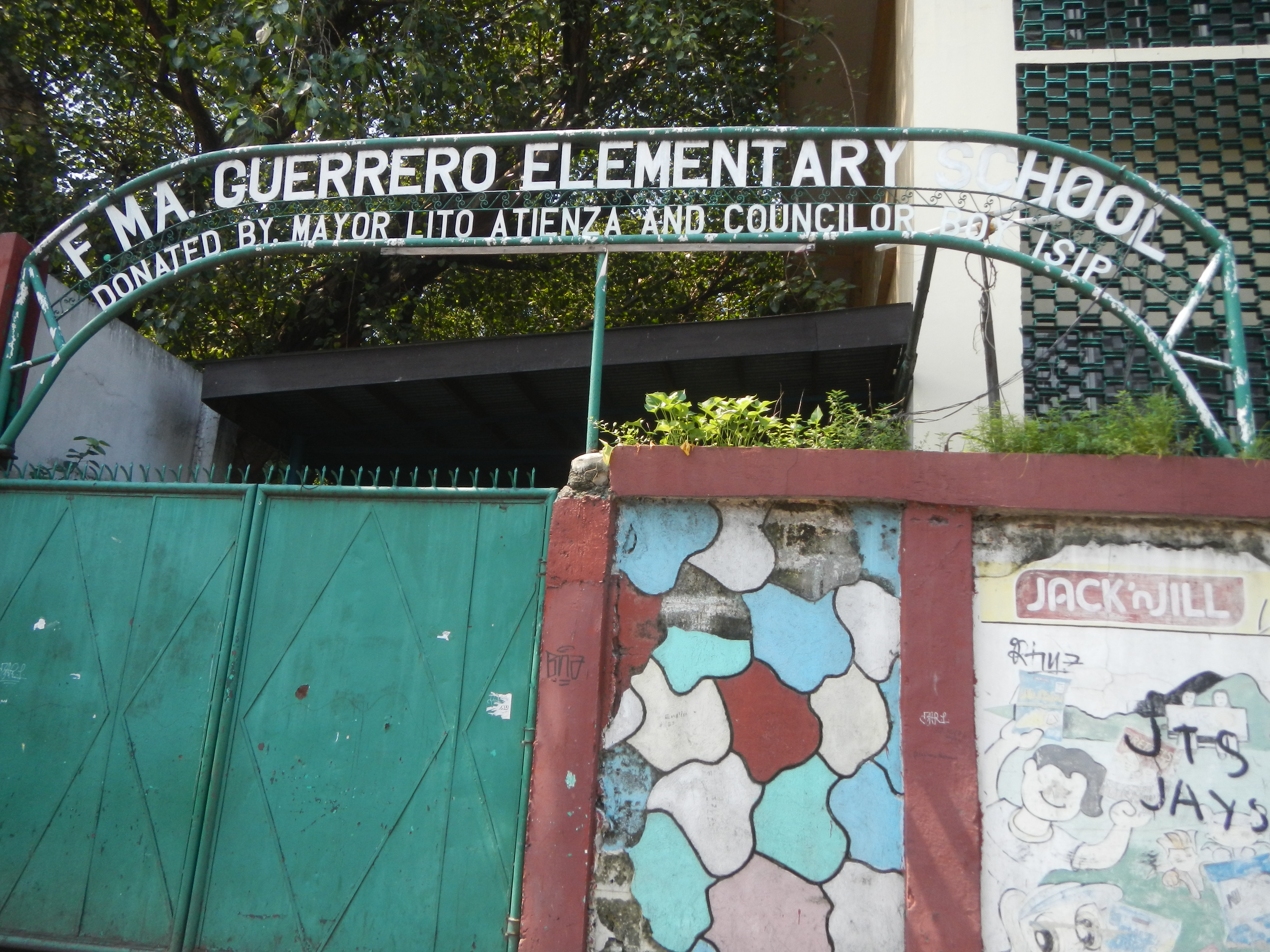
Fernando Maria Guerrero Elementary School (Paco, Manila)

To Spain

O, Noble Spain! Today
This song is for thee
A song that comes from afar
Like an old love
Trembling, palpitating
Fragrant with tradition
Opening its candid wings
Under the goldness of that sun of yours
Which we've received into our souls
With the fire of thy voice
In whose brightness ride
The stallions of hope.
My race adored the glory
Of the beauty of the Spanish tongue
That is spoken by the Quixotes
From this Malay region,
Where new Sanchos would like

that we instead spoke in Saxon tongue.

== See also ==
- Philippine literature
- Lourdes Castrillo Brillantes
- José Rizal
- Ilustrado
