= Manuel Artigas =

Filipino journalist and historian

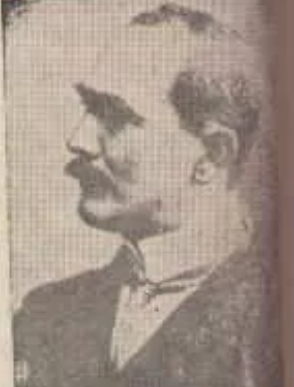
- Born: Manuel Artigas y Cuerva; October 15, 1866; Tacloban, Leyte, Captaincy General of the Philippines
- Died: April 2, 1925 (aged 58); Manila, Philippine Islands
- Occupations: historian; essayist; journalist
- Spouse: Luisa Losada y Mijares
- Children: 12
- Writing career
- Notable works: Manuel de Empleados (1891); Diccionario Tecnico-historico de la Administracion de Filipinas (1894)

Manuel Artigas y Cuerva (October 15, 1866 – April 2, 1925) was a Filipino journalist and historian who prolifically wrote in the Spanish language.

== Biography ==
=== Early life ===
Artigas was born in Tacloban, Leyte, on October 15, 1866. His parents were Miguel Artigas y Rodriguez, a Spaniard from Cadiz, Spain and Soledad Cuerva y Molina of Bulacan. They were originally from Baler but they moved to Leyte in 1860 when Soledad's father, an officer in the artillery corps, was transferred.

In 1874, his mother moved back to Manila. Manuel attended Colegio de la Immaculada Concepcion. He transferred to the Ateneo Municipal as an alumno interno de beca. He took up undergraduate studies in medicine at University of Santo Tomas. After three years he transferred to Colegio de San Juan de Letran. In 1883, he became a civil servant.

=== Career ===
Artigas book Historia de Filipinas

He was recognized because of his incessant writings and in 1907, he became assistant librarian in the Philippine Section of the American Circulating Library. He initiated Act No. 1849 which created the Philippine Public Library.

In 1919, he was promoted to curator of the Filipiniana division. Then, in 1911, he was appointed chief of the division. Four years later, he was promoted to chief of the Philippine Library, and in 1921, appointed acting director. He rapidly expanded the Filipiniana collection from 829 titles in December 1907 to more than 20,000 titles in December 1914. Artigas did this by acquiring the private collections of James LeRoy, Jose P. Rizal, Jose Clemente Zulueta, T.H. Pardo de Tavera, Mariano Ponce, and the Tabacalera. Due to his efforts, the Filipiniana collection of the Philippine National Library became one of the most complete collection in Philippine studies.

He was a member of the executive board of the Asociacion Historico-Geografica de Filipinas as well as the prestigious Academia de la Lengua Filipina. In 1915, he was inducted as an honorary corresponding member of the Real Sociedad Geografica de Madrid, and in 1916 entered the roster of members of the Real Academia de la Historia, and the Academia Hispano-Americana de Cadiz, Spain.

Aside from being a curator, librarian, and historian, Artigas also excelled in the development of Philippine historical studies through his many publications. Artigas wrote the biographies of Antonio Luna, Apolinario Mabini, Wenceslao Retana, Andres Bonifacio, Graciano Lopez Jaena, Juan Cailles, and Mariano Ponce. Apart from these biographies, he also published the multi-volume Galeria de Filipinos Ilustres, a book about important and illustrious Filipinos during that time.

Artigas died on April 2, 1925. His wife Luisa Losada y Mijares and 12 children were left destitute because it is said that he left them nothing but his books.

== Published works ==
To supplement his income, Artigas wrote prolifically, basing many of his works on important archival materials:

- El Municipio Filipino (a collection of laws of Manila)
- Historia Municipal de Filipinas desde los Primeros Tiempos de la Dominacion Española hasta nuestros Dias (1894, 2 vols)
- Los Sucesos de 1872 (Manila, 1911)
- Reseña de la Provincia de Leyte (Manila, 1914)
- El Procedimento Administrativo y la Jurisdiccion Centencioso-Administivo y la Jurisdiction en Filipinas
- Diccionario Tecnico-histerico de la Administracion de Filipinas-Manila
- Historia de las Revoluciones Filipinas
- Historia de Filipinas (Manila, 1916)
- El Parlamento Filipino-Manila
- La Primera Imprenta del Filipinas-Manila
- El General Antonio Luna Novicio
- Reseña Historica dela Universidad de Santo Tomas de Manila
- Historia de la Instruccion Publica en Filipinas
- Bibliografia Medico-Famtaceutica.
