= Lourdes Castrillo Brillantes =

Filipina writer

Lourdes Yupangco Castrillo-Brillantes is a Filipina writer in the Spanish language, professor, and a Premio Zobel awardee in 1998. She has authored works such as 81 Años del Premio Zobel (81 Years of the Premio Zobel), which documented the history of the Premio Zobel and its winners; and the Tesoro Literario de Filipinas, a compilation of Filipino short stories written in the 20th century. She was also a European Languages professor at the University of the Philippines and a contributor to the Cronica of the Manila Chronicle. She is the widow of Filipino writer Gregorio C. Brillantes.

== Works ==
- "81 Years of Premio Zobel: A Legacy of Filipino Literature in the Spanish Language" (2006)
- "Tesorio Literario de Filipinas" (2009)

== See also ==
- Fernando María Guerrero
- José Rizal
