= Edmundo Farolan =

Filipino-Canadian writer (1943–2023)

Edmundo Romero Farolán (December 30, 1943 – January 29, 2023) was a Filipino-Canadian writer and scholar. He won literary awards while studying philosophy and letters in Madrid in the 1960s. He taught English, Spanish, and Media at various universities, including Webster University Thailand, Silesian University in Opava, Dalian University, University of Toronto, University of Alberta, and Corpus Christi College.

Farolan obtained his bachelor's degree from Ateneo de Manila University, Licenciatura (Cand.) from the Universidad Central de Madrid, a master's degree in Hispanic Studies from the University of Toronto, and a doctorate in Speech Communication from Bowling Green State University. He acted professionally and directed for the Vancouver Actors' Theater and the Vancouver Experimental Theatre. He was the founding editor of the magazine website e-zine, ReviewVancouver, and Revista Filipina. He was the recipient of the Premio Zobel in 1982, the Philippines' highest literary honor for Filipinos writing in Spanish. As a leading authority in Spanish literature and language, he served as a senior correspondent for the Real Academia de la Lengua Española in the Philippines. He had published several books of poetry, anthologies, textbooks, and translations. He was published in Reflexiones Sobre el Primer Congreso Internacional de la Lengua Española as well as other books and articles in Spanish and English.

From 2002 to 2012, he lectured at the Université de Bretagne Occidentale (France), Ateneo Obrero de Gijón (Spain), University of Oulu, TU Dresden, Donetsk Academy (Ukraine), La Universidad Catolica del Norte (Chile), Thompson Rivers University, and Royal Roads University. He was awarded the Premio José Rizal de las Letras Filipinas in 2017.

Farolàn died on January 29, 2023, at the age of 79.

== Works ==
- Lluvias Filipinas (1967)
- The Rhythm of Despair (1974)
- Gramatica y Practica (1979)
- Don Segundo Sombra: traduccion tagala (1979)
- Literatura filhispana: una antologia (1980)
- Espanol para universitarios filipinos (1981)
- Tercera Primavera (1981)
- Oh Canada (1994)
- 2000 versos (2000)
- Media and Culture (2003)
- Religions and Intercultural Reciprocity (2004)
- Intercultural Communication (2005)
- Itinerancias: Comings and Goings(2006)
- 64 Solitudes (2008)
- Love, Travels and other Memoirs of a Filipino Writer (2009)
- Cuentos hispanofilipinos (2010)
- Hexalogia Teatral (2011)
- New Poems (2015–present)
- El diario de Frankie Aguinaldo (2016)
- Soledades (2017)
- Poems (2017)
- Bowling Green Chronicles 1972/73 (2017)
- Antonio Martinez Ballesteros and the Underground Theatre of Protest in Spain (2017)
- Novel: Novel II (2017)
- Johnny, Jimmy and Joey in Klamath Falls and other stories (2017)
- A Death in Tianjin and other stories (2017)
- Rizal (2017)
- Memoirs (2017)
- Metamorfosis: una anti-novela (2018)
- Six Short Essays (2019)
- Purgatorio (2019)
- The Passion and Death of Jesus Christ (2019)
- Palali: A Screenplay(2020)
- Fools and other plays (2020)
- An Nth Stream of Consciousness and other poems (2020)
- Cañon at iba pang mga tula (2020)
- Transcience and other poems (2021)
- Aguinaldo(2021)
- The Loser and other stories(2022)
