= Antonio Abad =

Filipino poet, fictionist, playwright and essayist (1894–1970)

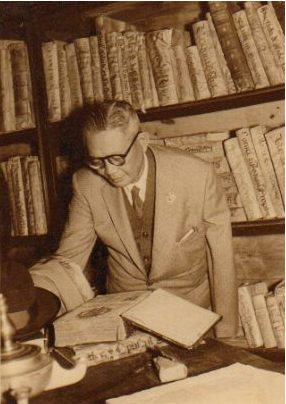
- Born: Antonio Abad y Mercado; May 10, 1894; Barili, Cebu, Captaincy General of the Philippines
- Died: April 20, 1970 (aged 75)
- Education: Colegio-Seminario de San Carlos
- Spouse: Jesusa Henson
- Children: Gémino H. Abad, Antonio H. Abad Jr., Edmundo H. Abad
- Writing career
- Language: Cebuano, Spanish
- Notable awards: Premio Zóbel, Premio Literario Filipino de la Mancomunidad

Antonio Abad y Mercado (May 10, 1894 – April 20, 1970) was a prominent Filipino poet, fictionist, playwright and essayist.

== Personal life ==
Antonio Abad y Mercado was born in Barili, Cebu, under the Captaincy General of the Philippines, on 10 May 1894. He was educated at the Colegio-Seminario de San Carlos in Cebu City. He married Kampampangan teacher Jesusa Henson y Aquino., and had three sons: Gémino, Antonio Jr., and Edmundo.

== Career ==
Abad frequently wrote in both, his native language, Cebuano, and Spanish. He was a strong advocate of the Spanish language and Hispanic-Filipino culture when it was discouraged during the American colonial period in the Philippines. Abad was one of the leading contributors of Hispanic-Filipino literature during his time, producing novels and plays criticizing the occupation of the islands by the Americans.

Throughout his life he collaborated with numerous newspapers, such as El Precursor, La Revolución, El Espectador, La Vanguardia, El Debate, La Defensa and The Cebu Advertiser. His works would later be known as part of the Golden Age of Fil-Hispanic Literature (1898-1941). Two of his novels went on to win the Premio Zóbel, the oldest literary award in the Philippines, in 1928 and 1929.

Abad taught Spanish at the Far Eastern University. In 1952, he moved to the University of the Philippines Diliman to found the Department of Spanish (now, the Department of European Languages) at the then, College of Liberal Arts. He headed the department until his retirement in 1959. One of his last works, a multilingual dictionary of Spanish, English, Cebuano, Ilocano and Kapampangan, remained unfinished after his death on 20 April 1970.

== Bibliography ==
- Ihrie, Maureen; Oropesa, Salvador (2011). World Literature in Spanish. An Encyclopedia. Vol. I. ABC-Clio. ISBN 978-0-313-33770-3.

== Novels ==
- El Último Romántico (1928)
- La Oveja de Nathán (1929)
- El Campeón (1940)
- La Vida Secreta de Daniel Espeña (1960)

== Plays ==
- Dagohoy, 1940 Philippine Commonwealth Literary Award.

== Essays ==
- De la hora Transeúnete, 1940, Philippine Commonwealth Literary Award.
