= Gaspar Aquino de Belén =

Gaspar Aquino de Belén, a native of Rosario, Batangas, was a Filipino poet and translator of the 17th century, known for authoring Mahal na Passion ni Jesu Christong Panginoon Natin na Tola, a 1704 rendition of the Pasyon: a famous work of Christian poetry about the passion, death and resurrection of Jesus. This 980-verse narrative is argued to have been written and first printed in 1703, then made official in 1704.

Aquino de Belen book

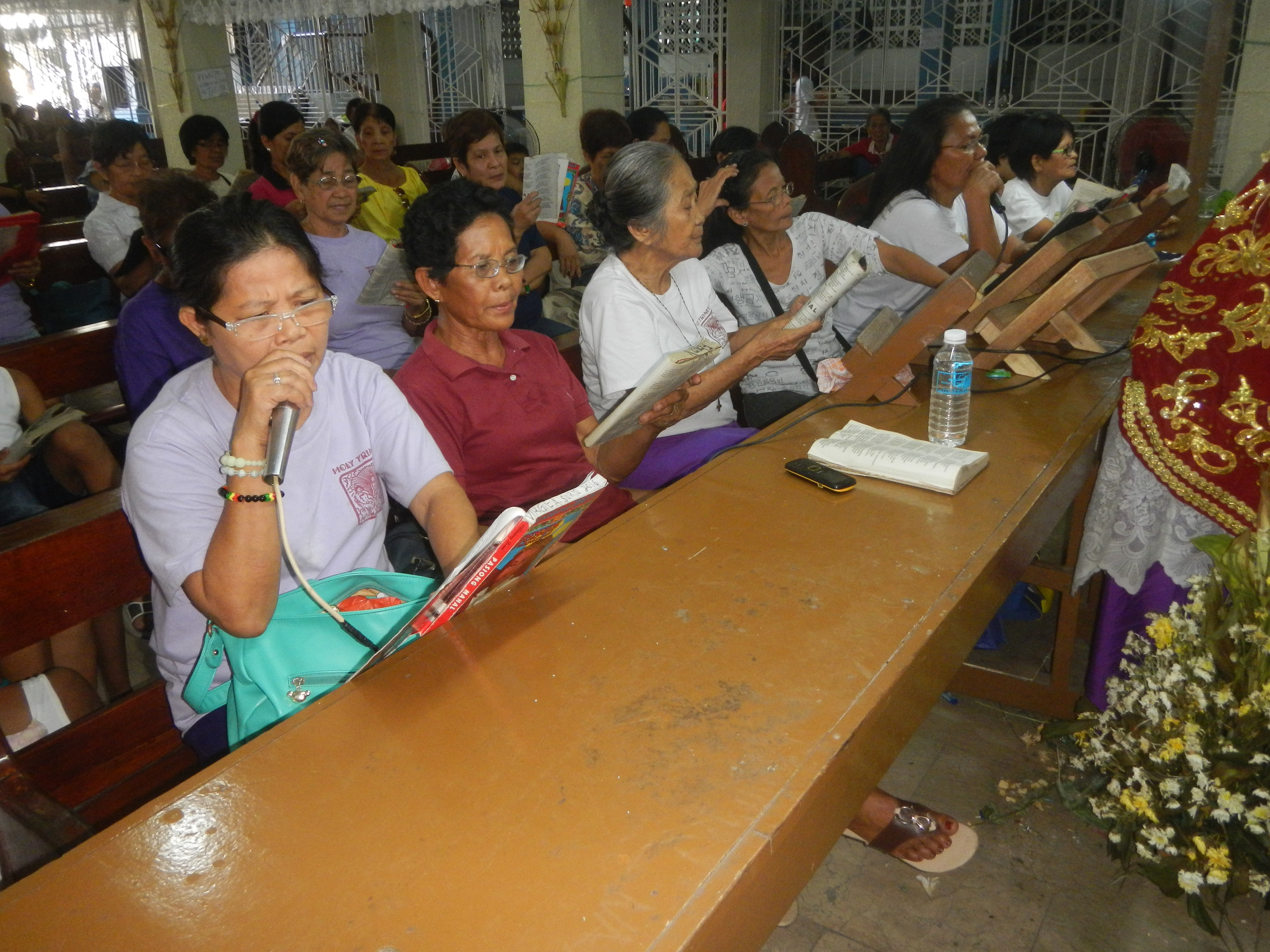
Pabasa (Malolos Diocese)

Generally Filipino natives were not taught the Spanish language but the bilingual individuals, notably poet-translator Aquino de Belén, produced devotional poetry written in Latin script in the Tagalog language.
