= Philippine literature in English =

Variety of literature

Philippine literature in English has its roots in the efforts of the United States, then engaged in a war with Filipino nationalist forces at the end of the 19th century. By 1901, public education was institutionalized in the Philippines, with English serving as the medium of instruction. That year, around 600 educators in the S.S. Thomas (the "Thomasites") were tasked to replace the soldiers who had been serving as the first teachers. Outside the academe, the wide availability of reading materials, such as books and newspapers in English, helped Filipinos assimilate the language quickly. Today, 78.53% of the population can understand or speak English (see List of countries by English-speaking population).

== The Commonwealth Period ==
The founding of Silliman University by Presbyterian missionaries and the Philippine Normal School (PNS) in 1901 and the University of the Philippines (U.P.) in 1908, as well as of English newspapers like the Daily Bulletin (1900), The Cablenews (1902), and the Philippines Free Press (1905), helped boost English usage. The first ten years of the century witnessed the first verse and prose efforts of Filipinos in student publications such as The Filipino Students’ Magazine first issue, 1905, a short-lived quarterly published in Berkeley, California, by Filipino pensionados (or government scholars); the U.P. College Folio (first issue, 1910); The Coconut of the Manila High School (first issue, 1912); and The Torch of the PNS (first issue, 1913).

However, the beginnings of anything resembling a professional market for writing in English would not be realized until the 1920s with the founding of other newspapers and magazines like the Philippines Herald in 1920, the Philippine Education Magazine in 1924 (renamed Philippine Magazine in 1928), and later the Manila Tribune, the Graphic, Woman's Outlook, and Woman's Home Journal. The publications helped introduce the reading public to the works of Paz Márquez-Benítez, José García Villa, Loreto Paras, Luis Dato, and Casiano Calalang, among others. Cash incentives were given to writers in 1921 when the Free Press started to pay for published contributions and awarded ₱1,000 for the best stories. The organization in 1925 of the Philippine Writers Association and in 1927 of the University of the Philippines National Writers Workshop, which put out the Literary Apprentice, also helped encourage literary production. In 1939, the Philippine Writers League was put up by politically conscious writers, intensifying their debate with those in the "art for art's sake" school of Villa.

Among the significant publications of this fertile period were:

- Filipino Poetry (1924) by Rodolfo Dato;
- Manila A Collection of Verse (1926) by Luis Dato
- English-German Anthology of Filipino Poets (1934) by Pablo Laslo;
- José García Villa's Many Voices (1939) and Poems of Doveglion (1941);
- Poems (1940) by Angela Manalang-Gloria;
- Chorus for America: Six Philippine Poets (1942) by Carlos Bulosan;
- Zoilo Galang's A Child of Sorrow (1921), the first Filipino novel in English, and Box of Ashes and Other Stories (1925), the first collection of stories in book form;
- Villa’s Footnote to Youth: Tales of the Philippines and Others (1933);
- "The Wound and the Scar" (1937) by Arturo Rotor, a collection of stories;
- "Winds of April" (1940) by N. V. M. Gonzalez;
- "His Native Soil" (1941) by Juan C. Laya;
- Manuel Arguilla's "How My Brother Leon Brought Home a Wife and Other Stories" (1941);
- Galang's "Life and Success" (1921), the first volume of essays in English; and
- the influential "Literature and Society" (1940) by Salvador P. López.

Dramatic writing took a backseat due to the popularity of Filipino vaudeville (bodabil) and Tagalog movies, although it was kept alive by the playwright Wilfredo Ma. Guerrero.

== The post-war period ==
During the Japanese occupation, when Tagalog was favored by the Japanese military authority, writing in English was consigned to limbo, since most of the English writers were forced to write in Tagalog or joined in the underground and wrote English stories based on the battles to serve as propaganda pieces in boosting the morale of the guerrillas. It picked up after the war, however, with a fervor and drive for excellence that continue to this day. Stevan Javellana's "Without Seeing the Dawn" (1947), the first postwar novel in English, was published in the United States. In 1946, the Barangay Writers Project was founded to help publish books in English..

Against a background marked by political unrest and government battles with Hukbalahap guerrillas, writers in English in the postwar period honed their sense of craft and techniques. Among the writers who came into their own during this time were, among many others:

- Carlos Bulosan (1913–1956)
- Linda Ty Casper (b. 1931)
- Gilda Cordero-Fernando (b. 1932)
- Amador Daguio
- Ricaredo Serrano
- N. V. M. Gonzalez (1915–1999)
- Sinai C. Hamada
- Alejandrino Hufana
- Dominador Ilio
- Nick Joaquin (1917–2004)
- F. Sionil José (1924–2022)
- Virginia Moreno (b. 1925)
- Peter Solis Nery (b. 1969)
- Vicente Rivera Jr.
- Alejandro R. Roces (1924–2011)
- Bienvenido Santos (1911–1996)
- Abelardo and Tarrosa Subido
- Edilberto K. Tiempo (1913–1996)
- Kerima Polotan Tuvera (1925–2011)
- Manuel A. Viray
- Raul Rafael R. Ingles
- Oscar de Zuñiga

Fresh from studies in American universities, usually as Fulbright or Rockefeller scholars, a number of these writers introduced New Criticism to the country and applied its tenets in literature classes and writing workshops. In this way were born the Silliman National Writers Workshop.

== Literary awards and competitions ==
In 1940, the first Commonwealth Literary Awards were given by President Manuel L. Quezon to Salvador P. Lopez for "Literature and Society" (essay), Manuel Arguilla for "How My Brother Leon Brought Home a Wife and Other Stories" (short story), R. Zulueta da Costa for "Like the Molave" (poetry), and Juan C. Laya for "His Native Soil" (novel).

Government recognition of literary merit came in the form of the Republic Cultural Heritage Awards (1960), the Pro Patria Awards for Literature (1961), and the National Artist Awards (1973). Only the last of these three awards survives today. Writers in English who have received the National Artist award include: Jose Garcia Villa (1973), Nick Joaquin (1976), Carlos P. Romulo (1982), Francisco Arcellana (1990), N. V. M. Gonzalez, Rolando Tinio (1997), Edith L. Tiempo, (2000), F. Sionil José (2003), and Bienvenido Lumbera (2006).

A select group of local writers have also received the international Magsaysay Award, namely, F. Sionil José, Nick Joaquin and Bienvenido Lumbera.

== Contemporary Writers ==
Despite the lack of a professional writer's market, poetry and fiction in English continue to thrive and be written with sophistication and insight. Among the fictionists of recent years are:

- Dean Francis Alfar
- Cecilia Manguerra Brainard
- Linda Ty Casper
- Ian Casocot
- Erwin Castillo
- Gilbert Luis R. Centina III
- Jose Dalisay Jr.
- Leoncio Deriada
- Buenaventura S. Medina Jr.
- Antonio Enriquez
- Eric Gamalinda
- Vicente Garcia Groyon
- Amadis Ma. Guerrero
- Cristina Pantoja - Hidalgo
- F. Sionil José
- Luis Joaquin Katigbak
- Ma. Francezca Kwe
- Angelo Rodriguez Lacuesta
- Susan Lara
- Jaime An Lim
- Issh Gajo
- Carmelo S.J. Juinio
- Rosario Cruz Lucero
- Renato Madrid
- Jesus Q. Cruz
- Resil Mojares
- Timothy Montes
- Peter Solis Nery
- Wilfredo Nolledo
- Charlson Ong
- Ninotchka Rosca
- Menchu Aquino Sarmiento
- Lakambini Sitoy
- Katrina Tuvera
- Alfred A. Yuson
- Jessica Zafra
- Rin Chupeco
- Patricia Evangelista

Poets include:

- Jolico Cuadra
- Luis Francia
- Gemino Abad
- Alexis Abola
- Merlie Alunan
- Cirilo Bautista
- Gilbert Luis R. Centina III
- Salvador Bernal
- Hilario Francia
- José Wendell Capili
- F. Jordan Carnice
- Elsa Coscoluella
- Ricardo de Ungria
- Lourd Ernest De Veyra
- Ophelia Alcantara Dimalanta
- Simeon Dumdum, Jr.
- Federico Licsi Espino Jr.
- Marjorie Evasco
- J. Neil C. Garcia
- Ramil Digal Gulle
- Ma. Luisa Igloria
- Mookie Katigbak
- Marne Kilates
- Emmanuel Lacaba
- Paolo Manalo
- Peter Solis Nery
- Arius Raposas
- Danton Remoto
- Angelo Suarez
- Ramon Sunico
- Juaniyo Arcellana
- Anthony Tan
- Joel Toledo
- Emmanuel Torres
- Naya Valdellon
- Edwin Cordevilla
- Clovis Nazareno

== See also ==
- List of countries where English is an official language
- List of countries by English-speaking population
- English literature
- Literature of the Philippines
- Philippine literature in Spanish
- Philippine Literature in Filipino and/or other Philippine languages
- Philippine English
- Filipiniana
- Philippine National Book Awards
- List of Filipino writers
- Philippine literature in Spanish
- Cebuano literature
- Ilokano literature
- Hiligaynon literature
- Pangasinan literature
- Tagalog literature
- Waray literature
