= Literature by country =

This is a list of literature pages categorized by country, language, or cultural group. Sometimes these literatures will be called national literatures because they help define a national identity or provide a common reference point for that country's culture.

- Abkhaz literature
- Albanian literature
- Algerian literature
- American literature

See also

- African American literature
- Native American literature
- Southern literature
- Deaf American literature

- Arabic literature
- Argentine literature
- Armenian literature
- Australian literature
- Austrian literature
- Azerbaijani literature
- Babylonian literature and science
- Basque literature
- Belarusian literature
- Belgian literature
- Bengali literature
- Bohemian literature
- Brazilian literature
- Breton literature
- British literature
- Bulgarian literature
- Burmese Literature
- Canadian literature
- Catalan literature
- Chechen literature
- Chilean literature
- Chinese literature
- Cornish literature
- Crimean Tatar literature
- Croatian literature
- Cuban literature
- Cypriot literature
- Czech literature
- Danish literature
- Dutch literature
- Ecuadorian literature
- Efik literature
- Egyptian literature
- English literature

See also

- Anglo-Norman literature
- Anglo-Saxon literature
- Anglo-Welsh literature

- Esperanto literature
- Estonian literature
- Ethiopian literature
- Filipino literature
- Finnish literature
- Flemish literature
- Francophone literature
- French literature
- Filipino literature
- Frisian literature
- Galician literature
- Georgian literature
- German literature
- Greek literature
- Hebrew literature
- Hindi literature
- Hong Kong literature
- Hungarian literature
- Icelandic literature
- Ilokano literature
- Indian literature
- Indonesian literature
- Irish literature
- Israeli literature
- Italian literature
- Japanese literature
- Jèrriais literature
- Kannada literature
- Kashmiri literature
- Kazakhstani literature
- Kurdish literature
- Korean literature
- Latin literature

See also

- Anglo-Latin literature
- Christian Latin literature

- Latvian literature
- Lithuanian literature
- Luxembourg literature
- Macedonian literature
- Malayalam literature
- Maltese literature
- Manx literature
- Marathi literature
- Mexican literature
- Moldovan literature
- Montenegrin literature
- Moroccan literature
- Nepali literature
- New Zealand literature
- Nigerian literature
- Norwegian literature
- Occitan literature
- Ossetian literature
- Pakistani literature
- Persian literature
- Peruvian literature
- Polish literature
- Portuguese literature
- Provençal literature
- Puerto Rican literature
- Quebec literature
- Romanian literature
- Russian literature
- Rwandan literature
- Sanskrit literature
- Scottish literature
- Serbian literature
- Sri Lankan literature
- Singaporean literature
- Saraiki literature
- Slovak literature
- Slovene literature
- Somali literature
- Serbian literature
- South African literature
- Spanish literature

See also

- Latin American literature

- Swahili literature
- Swedish literature
- Swiss literature
- Syriac literature
- Syrian literature
- Literature of Taiwan
- Tamil literature
- Tajik literature
- Telugu literature
- Thai literature
- Turkish literature
- Ukrainian literature
- Urdu literature
- Venezuelan literature
- Vietnamese literature
- Waray literature
- Welsh literature
- Yiddish literature
- Yoruba literature

Other

- Western literature

== See also ==
- Category:Literature by nationality
