= Hiligaynon literature =

Hiligaynon literature consists of both the oral and written works in Hiligaynon, the language of the Hiligaynon people in the Philippine regions of Western Visayas and Soccsksargen.

== Notable works ==
- Religio Cristiano Apostolica Romana – the first book entirely written in Hiligaynon, authored by Mariano Cuartero
- Ang Babai nga Huaran – possibly first modern Hiligaynon play and the first modern play overall in any Philippine language, written by Cornelio Hilado in either 1878 or 1894
- Quinabuhi kag Pasion ni Hesukristo nga Aton Ginoo (1884) – written by Mariano Perfecto
- Ang Mutia nga Matin-aw (1894) – a play written by Eriberto Gumban
- Ang Capitan (1903) – the first Hiligaynon zarzuela to be performed, written by Valente "Valentin" Cristobal and composed by Juan Paterno
- Ang Nagahigugma sa Iya Duta (1906) – the first Hiligaynon zarzuela to be written (in 1899), with its libretto by Salvador Ciocon
- Benjamin (1907) – the first Hiligaynon novel, written by Angel Magahum Sr. in 1894
- Nating (1908) – a zarzuela written by Valentín Cristóbal and composed by Teodoro Gallego
- Talikala (1916) - a play written by Serapion C. Torre
- Cusug sang Imul (1923) - a play written by Miguela Montelibano
- Bunal nga Ualay Labud (1924) - Leopoldo Alerta
- "Sa Dalagang Ilong-Ilonganon" (1926) – a poem by Flavio Zaragoza y Cano
- Mga Hinugpong nga Malip-ut nga Sugilanon (1935) – an anthology of short stories by Angel Magahum Sr.
- "De Mactan a Tirad" (1940) – a poem by Flavio Zaragoza y Cano
- Margosatubig: Maragtas ni Salagunting (1946) – a novel by Ramon Muzones
- Juanita Cruz (1968) – a novel by Magdalena Jalandoni
- Lirio (1998) – a short story by Peter Solis Nery
- Ang Pangayaw (2000) – a short story by Peter Solis Nery
- Ang Kapid (2006) – a short story by Peter Solis Nery
- Candido (2007) – a short story by Peter Solis Nery
- Donato Bugtot (2011) – a short story by Peter Solis Nery
- Si Padre Olan kag ang Dios (2013) – a short story by Peter Solis Nery
- Ang Milagro sa Ermita (2017) – a short story by Peter Solis Nery

== Notable Hiligaynon writers ==
- Antonio Ledesma Jayme (1854–1937) – lawyer, revolutionary, provincial governor and assemblyman. Born in Jaro, Iloilo City, lived in Bacolod.
- Graciano López Jaena (1856–1896) – journalist, orator, and revolutionary from Iloilo, well known for his written works in La Solidaridad and the satirical story Fray Botod. Born in Jaro, Iloilo City.
- Angel Magahum Sr. (1867–1931) – writer, editor and composer. Composed the classic Iloilo ang Banwa Ko, the unofficial song of Iloilo. Born in Molo, Iloilo City.
- Valente Cristóbal (1875–1945) – Hiligaynon playwright. Born in Polo, Bulacan (now Valenzuela City), lived in Iloilo City.
- Magdalena Jalandoni (1891–1978) – prolific writer, novelist and feminist. Born in Jaro, Iloilo City.
- Serapion C. Torre (1892–1942) – Hiligaynon litterateur, poet, novelist, zarzuela writer, and playwright, known as the Father of Modern Hiligaynon Literature. Born in Mandurriao, Iloilo City.
- Flavio Zaragoza y Cano (1892–1965) – lawyer, journalist and the "Prince of Visayan poets". Born in Cabatuan, Iloilo.
- Ramon Muzones (1913–1992) – novelist, poet, and essayist. Born in Miagao, Iloilo.
- Conrado Saquian Norada (born 1921) – lawyer, intelligence officer and governor of Iloilo from 1969 to 1986. Co-founder and editor of Yuhum magazine. Born in Miagao, Iloilo.
- Peter Solis Nery (born 1969) – prolific writer, poet, playwright, novelist, editor, "Hari sang Binalaybay", and champion of the Hiligaynon language. Born in Dumangas, Iloilo.
- Elizabeth Batiduan Navarro – Hiligaynon drama writer for radio programs of Bombo Radyo Philippines.

== See also ==
- Hiligaynon language
- Philippine literature
- Filipiniana
- Philippine National Book Awards
- List of Filipino writers
- Philippine literature in English
- Philippine literature in Spanish
- Cebuano literature
- Ilokano literature
- Pangasinan literature
- Tagalog literature
- Waray literature
