= List of Tagalog literary works =

This is a list of Tagalog literary works.

== Notable literary works ==
- Manga Panalanging Pagtatagobilin sa Caloloua nang Tauong Naghihingalo by Gaspar Aquino de Belen, 1703.
- Florante at Laura (Florante and Laura) by Francisco Balagtas, 1838.
- Urbana at Feliza (Urbana and Feliza) by Modesto de Castro, 1854.
- Banaag at Sikat (From Early Dawn to Full Light)" by Lope K. Santos, 1906.
- Ang Huling Timawa by Servando de Los Angeles, 1936.
- Kayumanggi at Iba Pang Mga Tula by Amado V. Hernandez, 1940.
- Timawa (Free Person/Slave) by Agustin Fabian, 1953.
- Luha ng Buwaya by Amado V. Hernandez, 1963.
- Sa Mga Kuko ng Liwanag (In the Claws of Brightness) by Edgardo M. Reyes, 1966–1967.
- Dekada '70 by Lualhati Bautista, 1983.

== Writers ==
- Gaspar Aquino de Belen (fl. 1703)
- Francisco Balagtas (1788–1862)
- Lualhati Bautista (1945–2023)
- José de la Cruz (1746–1829)
- Agustin Fabian (1901–1976)
- Lázaro A. Francisco (1898–1980)
- Bienvenido Lumbera (1932–2021)
- Rolando Tinio (1937–1997)
- Jose Bernardino Capino
- Rene O. Villanueva (1954–2007)

== See also ==
- Tagalog pocketbooks
- Philippine literature
- Filipiniana
- National Book Awards (Philippines)
- List of Filipino writers
- Philippine literature in English
- Philippine literature in Spanish
- Cebuano literature
- Hiligaynon literature
- Ilocano literature
- Pangasinan literature
- Waray literature
