= Teresita (given name) =

Teresita is a diminutive version of the Spanish given name Teresa. People with this name include:

- Teresita Abundo (born 1949), Filipino educator and athlete
- Teresita Barajuen (1907 – 2013), Spanish Roman Catholic nun
- Teresita de Barbieri (1937-2018), Uruguayan-born Mexican feminist sociologist, academic, researcher
- Teresita de Jesús Borges (born 1965), Mexican politician
- Teresita Caraveo (born 1961), Mexican politician
- Teresita Castillo (1927–2016), Filipino Roman Catholic nun
- Teresita de Castro (born 1948), Filipino judge
- Teresita Collado (born 1971), Guatemalan athlete
- Teresita Fernández (born 1968), American visual artist
- Teresita Gómez (born 1943), Colombian pianist and music teacher
- Teresita Herbosa (born 1950), chairwoman of the Filipino Securities and Exchange Commission
- Teresita Lazaro (born 1942), Filipino politician
- Teresita Manaloto-Magnaye, Filipina short story writer
- Teresita Márquez (born 1992), Filipino actress, model, dancer and beauty queen
- Teresita Quintela, Argentine politician
- Teresita Reyes (1950–2025), Chilean actress
- Teresita Sandoval (1811–1894), a founder of Pueblo, Colorado
- Teresita Santos, politician from the Northern Mariana Islands
- Teresita Sy-Coson, Filipina businesswoman
- Teresa Urrea, often referred to as Teresita (1873–1906), Mexican mystic, folk healer, and revolutionary insurgent
- Teresita Román Vélez (1925–2021), Colombian writer and chef
- Teresita Zazá (1893–1980), Spanish tonadillera, cupletista, and actress

== See also ==
- Teresita (disambiguation)
