= Ilocano =

Ilocano or Ilokano may refer to:

- Ilocano people
- Ilocano language
- Ilocano literature
- a former genus of stick insects, which was synonymized with the genus Tisamenus
