= Pangasinan literature =

The Pangasinan language belongs to the Malayo-Polynesian languages branch of the Austronesian languages family. Pangasinan is spoken primarily in the province of Pangasinan in the Philippines, located on the west central area of the island of Luzon along Lingayen Gulf.

== History ==
The earliest known written records in the Pangasinan language were written in the ancient Pangasinan script called Kurítan. A writing system related to the Tagalog Baybayin script and the Javanese Kavi script. The Pangasinan script, like the other writing systems used in ancient Southeast Asia were probably influenced by the Brahmi script of ancient India and originated from the Sumerian cuneiform script that was used in the ancient land of Sumer in Mesopotamia where the earliest known written records were found.

The Latin alphabet was introduced after the Spanish conquest of Pangasinan in 1571. During the Spanish colonial period, the use of the Latin alphabet became more widespread. Most of the existing literary works in the Pangasinan language are written in the Latin alphabet.

== Pangasinan Literary Terms ==
- academy - awiran
- biography - awaran-dili, bilay-awaran
- chapter - tekap
- criticism - palikuer
- diary - talaagewan
- edit - saluysoy
- elegy - tagleey
- essay - salaysay
- fiction - diglat
- history - awaran
- legend - uliran
- literary contest - paliagan
- literature - kuritan
- maxim - diparan
- meter - daglit
- music - laineng
- myth - gawaran
- narrative - tongtong, salaysay
- novel - kombilay
- ode - dayew
- page - egpang
- poem - anlong
- poet - umaanlong
- poetic - maanlong
- poetry - anlong
- poetry reading - anlongan
- preface - pasingawey
- print - igalut
- proverb - diparan
- rhyme - mitatanol
- riddle - pabitla, bonikew
- serenade - petek
- song - dangoan, kansion
- story - tagaumen, tongtong
- syllable - kataga
- tale - tongtong

Ancient Pangasinan literature includes the texttongtong, uliran, diparan, and pabitla.

- Tongtong: Pangasinan Stories
- Dangoan/Kansion/Togtog: Pangasinan Songs
- Uliran: Pangasinan Myths and Legends
- Diparan: Pangasinan Sayings and Proverbs
- Pabitla/Bonikew: Pangasinan Riddles

== Pangasinan Literature Index ==
Pangasinan Fiction

- Leonarda C. Carrera. Matuan panangaro. (Dagupan City: Amor Cico, 1983).
- Maria C. Magsano. Colegiala Dolores. Komaduan tomo. (Dagupan City: Pangasinan Review Press, 1950).
- Maria C. Magsano. Duksay Kapalaran. (Dagupan City: Pangasinan Review Press, 1959).
- Maria c. Magsano. Duksay Kapalaran. Nankaduan libro, 1st Ed. (Dagupan City: Pangasinan Review Press, 1959).
- Maria C. Magsano. Samban Agnabenegan: sakey a kombilay. (Dagupan City: Pangasinan Review Press, 1954).
- Emmanuel S. Sison. Tales from the Land of Salt - A glimpse into the history and the rich folklores of Pangasinan. (Makati: Elmyrs Publishing House, November 2005).
- Emmanuel S. Sison. More Tales from the Land of Salt - Continuing the saga of the Salt People. (Makati: Elmyrs Publishing House, December 2006).
- Juan C. Villamil. Diad Lawak na bilay. (Dagupan City: J.C. Villamil, 1978).
- Juan C. Villamil. Siak tan sika. (Dagupan City, 1978).

Pangasinan Christian Literature

- A collection of 49 sermons. (Madrid, 1851). 297 pages.
- A collection of 119 sermons. (Dominican Fathers, 1858). 769 pages.
- Pasion. (1855).
- A catechism. (1869). 116 pages.
- St. Antonio Ma. Claret (Fr. Agustin Gallego, O.P., translator). Dalan a Maptek. A prayer book. 528 pages.
- Fr. Agustin Gallego, O.P. Visits of St. Ligorio.
- Fr. Mazo (Fr. Salvador Millan, O.P., translator). Catecismo na Doktrina Cristiana. 846 pages.
- St. Alfonso Ligorio (Fr. Salvador Millan, O.P., translator). El Libro del Pueblo o Bangat iran nipaakad ed saray samploran Ganggay Dios. 355 pages.
- St. Alfonso Ligorio (Fr. Benito Sanchez Fraga, O.P., translator). The Glories of Mary.
- St. Pius X (Fr. Feliciano Martin, O.P., translator). Catechism.
- Fr. Mariano Rodriguez. A history of Our Lady of Manawag. 428 pages.
- Fr. Mariano Rodriguez. A translation of Sunday gospels. 223 pages.
- Holy Bible. (Spanish Bible of De Valera. Published by American Bible Society, 1924).
- Fr. Evaristo Soriano, translator. Pangalig ed Kristo (Imitation of Christ).
- Fr. F. Martin, O.P. Antikey a Katesismo. 209 pages.
- Agamil tan Bangat na Kristyano Katoliko.

== Pangasinan Usage, Grammar, Dictionaries ==
- Lorenzo Fernández Cosgaya. Diccionario pangasinán-español and Vocabulario Hispano-Pangasinán (Colegio de Santo Tomás, 1865). This is available in the Internet at the University of Michigan's Humanities Text Initiative.
- Anastacio Austria Macaraeg. Vocabulario castellano-Pangasinán. 2nd. ed. (Manila: Tipografia Amigos del pais, 1898).
- Anastacio Austria Macaraeg. Vocabulario Hispano-Pangasinán. 3rd ed. (Manila: Imp. Fajardo y C. al., 1904).
- Mariano Pellicer. Arte de la lengua pangasinán o caboloan (1904).
- A. Rayner. Gramatica Pangasinan. (Methodist Mission). 70 pages.
- S. A. Pobre. Vocabulario Ilokano-Castellano-English-Pangasinan. 100 pages.
- Jose F. Llamas. Pocket Dictionary English-Tagalog-Spanish-Pangasinan. (PBC). 249 pages.
- Cenon Garcia. Diccionario Ingles-Espanol-Ilocano-Pangasinan. 273 pages.
- Felixberto B. Viray. The Sounds and Sound Symbols of the Pangasinan Language (1927).
- H. Yamamoto. Diccionario. (Honolulu, Hawaii, 1929).
- Pablo Jacobo Enriquez. Pocket Dictionary: English-Tagalog-Spanish-Pangasinan vocabulary. (Manila: Philippine Book Company, 1952).
- Iluminada M. Magno. A critical study of the zarzuelas in Pangasinan of Catalino Palisoc. (1954).
- Paciencia E. Versoza. Stress and Intonation Difficulties of Pangasinan Learners of English (1961).
- Isabel Roxas Mendoza. Aspect in English and Pangasinan verbs: a contrastive analysis. (1965).
- Paul Morris Schachter. A Contrastive Analysis of English and Pangasinan (1968).
- Fidel de Amurrio, Rev. Pangasinan grammar. (Bugallon, Pangasinan: Rev. Fidel de Amurrio, 1970).
- Belen Parayno Magat. Case and number in English and in Pangasinan: contrastive analysis. (Quezon City, 1970).
- Revocata A. Fernandes. A survey of the dialect geography of six towns of Pangasinan: Bautista, Pozorrubio, Dagupan City, Lingayen, Alaminos, Mangatarem. (Quezon City: s.n., 1970).
- Richard A. Benton. Pangasinan Dictionary (University of Hawaii Press, 1971).
- Richard A. Benton. Pangasinan Reference Grammar (University of Hawaii Press, 1971).
- Richard A. Benton. Spoken Pangasinan (University of Hawaii Press, 1971).
- Richard A. Benton. Phonotactics of Pangasinan (1972).
- Adela Marzo Quizon. Tagalog-Pangasinan cognate words with identical and different meanings. (Manila: Institute of National Language, 1972).
- Anastacio Austra Macaraeg. Vocabulario Hispano-Pangasinán (Quezon City: University of the Philippines Library, 1975).
- Ernesto Constantino. English-Pangasinan Dictionary (1975).
- Julio F. Silverio. New English-Pilipino-Pangasinan Dictionary (National Bookstore, 1976).
- Juan C. Villamil. Public Speaking, sales talk and proverbs in Pangasinan: English-Pangasinan dictionary: Official and professional directory. (Dagupan City: Maramba Press, 1976).
- Roman Maria de Bera. Gramatica Pangasinan: entresacada de varias anteriores y de otros libros. (Quezon City: University of the Philippines Library, 1979).
- Alta Grace Q. Garcia. Morphological Analysis of English and Pangasinan Verbs (1981).
- Rosa Maria Magsano. Urduja beleaguered and other essays on Pangasinan language, literature and culture. (Manila: Kalikasan Press, 1992).
- Mario "Guese" Tungol. Modern English-Filipino-Pangasinan Dictionary (Merriam Webster, 1993).
- Camilo Olaviano Osias. Babasaey ombaley: onan aralen. H. Caniza tan Antonio Ramos. (Quezon City: University of the Philippines Diliman Library, 1998).
- Mel V. Jovellanos. A Pangasinan-English, English-Pangasinan Language Dictionary (Dagupan City: Jubeic Publishing, 2002). The compilation has 20,000 entries.
- Mel V. Jovellanos. Pangasinan-English English-Pangasinan Language Dictionary, includes Dagupan City Handbook. (Calasiao, Pangasinan: Corpuz Press, March 2007)

== See also ==
- Pedro Bucaneg
- Pangasinan people
- Pangasinan language
- Philippine literature for literatures of other languages of the Philippines
- Filipiniana
- Philippine National Book Awards
- List of Filipino writers
- Philippine literature in English
- Philippine literature in Spanish
- Tagalog literarature
- Cebuano literature
- Ilokano literature
- Hiligaynon literature
- Tagalog literature
- Waray literature
