= Pangasinan (disambiguation) =

Pangasinan is a coastal province in the Philippines, on the island of Luzon.

Pangasinan or Pangasinense may also refer to:

- Pangasinan people, one of the indigenous peoples of the Philippines
- Pangasinan language, a Malayo-Polynesian language
- Pangasinan literature
- Pangasinan Island in the Sulu Archipelago, Philippines
