= Caraveo =

Caraveo is a surname. Notable people with the surname include:

- Patrizia Caraveo (born 1954), Italian astrophysicist
- Teresita Caraveo (born 1961), Mexican politician
- Yadira Caraveo (born 1980), American politician and pediatrician

== See also ==
- Caraveo, a locality of Blimea, Asturias, Spain
- Caraveo, a locality of L'Abadía Cenero, Asturias, Spain
