= Philippine literature =

Philippine literature is literature associated with the Philippines from prehistory, through its colonial legacies, and on to the present.

== Characteristics ==
Characteristics of Philippine literature include frequent use of commas, conjunctions, and the use of a variation of English known as Filipino-English or Taglish.

== History ==
=== Precolonial period ===
According to Filipino historian Teodoro Agoncillo, the Ilocano people, whose nomadic lifestyle in the highlands bred stories of adventures far more than other Filipinos living in the lowlands, were one of the most significant contributors to early Philippine literature. The Ilocano used the dallot, an improvised, versified and at times impromptu form of epic poetry, delivered and narrated in a song-like manner. The most famous of these epics was the Biag ni Lam-ang.

Other forms of literature written by pre-colonial Ilocano were songs (kankanta), dances (salsala), poems (dandaniw), riddles (burburtia), proverbs (pagsasao), and lamentations (dung-aw). Other traditional Filipino epics by other ethnicities include the Hudhud ni Aliguyon of the Ifugao, Hinilawod of Panay, Ibalon from Bicol, and Darangen of the Maranao. During this time, different oral myths and folk tales were developed, eventually leading to their embedment in Filipino culture, such as Ibong Adarna, Bernardo Carpio, Maria Makiling, and several creation myths.

=== Spanish period ===
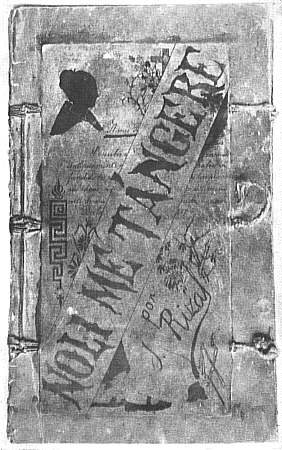
Noli Me Tángere is a novel published by José Rizal that sparked the Philippine Revolution together with its sequel El filibusterismo.

The Spanish colonization of the Philippine islands led to the introduction of European literary traditions. Many of these were influenced heavily by the Spanish language and the Catholic faith. These traditions include poetry such as tanaga, ladino, corridos, and awit; religious dramas such as moriones, santacruzan, panunuluyan and senakulo; and secular dramas like comedia, duplo, and karagatan. Many Filipino authors rose to prominence during this time, such as Francisco Balagtas, the author of Florante at Laura (1838); and Huseng Sisiw, author of Singsing ng Pagibig. Florante et Laura, which combines history, romance, and religion, became the premier Filipino story taught in schools nationwide. Another influential writer was Leona Florentino, the mother of Philippine women's literature whose work catapulted feminism to the forefront of the revolution.

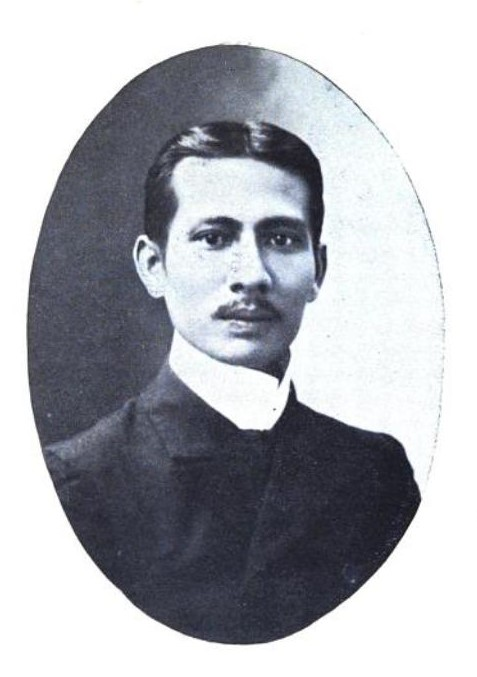
Fernando María Guerrero, a literary figure during the Philippines' golden period of Spanish literature.

On December 1, 1846, the first daily newspaper, La Esperanza, was published in the country. Other early newspapers were La Estrella (1847), Diario de Manila (1848) and Boletin Oficial de Filipinas (1852). The first provincial newspaper was El Eco de Vigan (1884), which was issued in Ilocos. In Cebu City, El Boletín de Cebú (The Bulletin of Cebu) was published in 1890. One of the most influential Spanish-language Filipino newspapers was El Renacimiento (1901), printed in Manila by members of the Guerrero de Ermita family until the 1940s.

The Philippine Revolution brought a larger wave of nationalistic literary works. A bulk of the writers of the era were propagandists and revolutionaries who wanted either representation of the Filipino people or total independence from Spanish authority. These include the works of Ilustrados like Pedro Alejandro Paterno, who wrote the first novel written by a Filipino, Nínay (1885); Graciano López Jaena and later on by Marcelo H. del Pilar, who edited and published the pro-Filipino newspaper La Solidaridad (1889); and the Philippine national hero, José Rizal, who wrote two famous novels in Spanish, Noli Me Tángere (1887) and El Filibusterismo (1891).

=== American period ===
The American occupation and eventual colonization of the Philippines paved the way for newer styles and genres. Compared to the more rigid literature of the Spanish era, the American period saw the popularity of free verse in the Philippines, allowing for flexible poetry, prose, and other word craft. The introduction of the English language was also of equal importance, as it became one of the most common languages that Filipino writers would use going forward.

The first English novel written by a Filipino was The Child of Sorrow (1921) written by Zoilo Galang. Early writings in English were characterized by melodrama, unreal language, and emphasis on local color. Short stories also gained popularity during this period with many serials and stories published independently or through newspapers. The most well-known was from the author Manuel Arguilla and his anthology How My Brother Leon Brought Home a Wife and Other Short Stories (1940), which won first prize in the Commonwealth Literary Contest.

During this time, there was also a resurgence of interest in Filipino mythology and folklore, and many works concerning them would be published, with the most well-known being the many anonymous stories about the folk character Juan Tamad (1919). The level of poetry in the Philippines had also risen, with poet Jose Garcia Villa making impacts in poetry history for introducing the style of comma poetry and the "reversed consonance rhyme scheme".

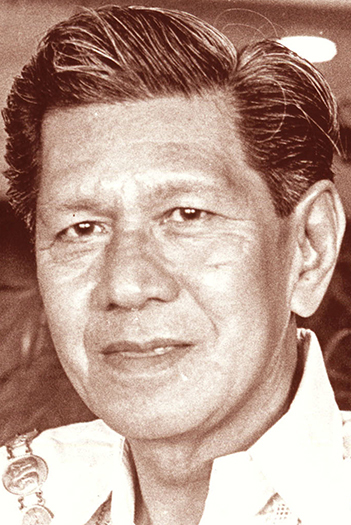
Nick Joaquin, National Artist of the Philippines for Literature

=== Postwar Era ===
As the Philippines gained its sovereignty from America, patriotism once again became a central theme in Filipino literature. Besides stories of Filipino mythology and history, there was also a boom in tales depicting the simple life of the common Filipino. These stories often took place in the countryside, and portrayed every day Filipino activities like church-going, farming, courting, and cockfighting. The most well-known example was the short story "My Brother's Peculiar Chicken" by Alejandro Roces. Other prominent writers during the mid-20th century were Carlos Bulosan, Nick Joaquin, Wilfrido Nolledo, Bienvenido Santos, and Rolando S. Tinio. Carlos Bulosan, in particular, published the novel America Is In The Heart (1946), which became one of the earliest glimpses and representations of the life of Asian-American immigrants in the West.

Later on, political and protest literature became wildly present, especially during the Martial Law era. By this time, there became a focus on criticizing and satirizing the current status of the Philippines, rather than just celebrating the nation like those before it. Lualhati Bautista was one of the earliest to infuse activism in her writing, crafting stories with heavy social commentary from a feminist perspective, such as Dekada '70 (1983) and Bata, Bata... Pa'no Ka Ginawa? (1988). Although her books were written in Filipino, they were translated into multiple languages and adapted into award-winning films. F. Sionil Jose is also a similar author who tackled social injustice and elitism in his Rosales Saga (1973-1984). Other works included Mga Ibong Mandaragit (1969) by Amado V. Hernandez and Conjugal Dictatorship (1976) by Primitivo Mijares.

The last decade and a half of the 20th century, after the ousting of the Marcos dictatorship by the civilian-led People Power Revolution of 1986, was characterized by rapid social and technological change. Some of the most notable fiction from this period was strongly influenced by magic realism, including the works of César Ruiz Aquino, Alfred Yuson, and poet-fictionist Mario Gamalinda.

=== Early 21st century ===
The rise of mass printing and digital technology led to better accessibility for Filipino authors who wanted to publish their work. The internet had become a revolutionary tool for Filipino authors to reach readers outside of the Philippines. Publishing houses like PSICOM flourished, as well as a rise in popularity of self-publishers and web fiction sites like Wattpad; many of which favored romance and romantic-comedy books that were later adapted into high-grossing films. The first titles to achieve this include Bob Ong's ABNKKBSNPLAko?! (2001), Ramon Bautista's Bakit Hindi Ka Crush ng Crush Mo? (2012), and Danny R.’s web novel Diary ng Pangit (2013).

Around this time, several Filipinos began to dabble into current literary trends, tackling modern issues of diversity and mental health, while also introducing international readers to Filipino culture and language. Two of the most popular international Filipino writers of the early 21st century include Rin Chupeco, who made a name for themselves publishing Young Adult fiction, many of which were inspired by Filipino mythology from Maria Makiling to the Mangkukulam.

The 21st century also saw the rise in popularity of many Filipina writers. One of the most famous is Ivy Alvarez, a Filipino-Australian who gained acclaim for her collection of poems entitled Disturbance (2013), which contained themes of domestic abuse. Another writer is Yvette Fernandez, a children's book author from Summit Media whose books tackled history and morality. Patricia Evangelista, journalist-writer of both Rappler and Esquire, wrote the book Some People Need Killing (2023) that became one of the primary accounts of the Philippine drug war. Other contemporary Filipina writers include Marites Vitug and Merlie M. Alunan.

== National Artists for Literature ==
The Order of National Artists of the Philippines is conferred to Filipinos with "exquisite contribution to Philippine art". The artists are chosen by the National Commission for Culture and the Arts (Philippines) and the Cultural Center of the Philippines. The Order is given by the President of the Philippines. The award is currently not retroactive, so Filipino artists who have passed before 1973, including those from the Spanish colonial era, are not given the award even though they have made significant contributions to the country, with the "special exemption" of three individuals who died at the final years of the Third Republic. Some individuals currently not allowed by law to become National Artists include national hero, Jose Rizal, and Leona Florentino.

Awardees of the National Artist of the Philippines Order, for Literature, include:

- 1973 – Amado V. Hernandez, National Artist for Literature
- 1973 – Jose Garcia Villa, National Artist for Literature
- 1976 – Nick Joaquin, National Artist for Literature
- 1982 – Carlos P. Romulo, National Artist for Literature
- 1990 – Francisco Arcellana, National Artist for Literature
- 1997 – Rolando S. Tinio, National Artist for Theater and Literature
- 1997 – Levi Celerio, National Artist for Music and Literature
- 1997 – N.V.M. Gonzales, National Artist for Literature
- 1997 – Carlos Quirino, National Artist for Historical Literature
- 1999 – Edith L. Tiempo, National Artist for Literature
- 2001 – F. Sionil Jose, National Artist for Literature
- 2003 – Virgilio S. Almario, National Artist for Literature
- 2003 – Alejandro Roces, National Artist for Literature
- 2006 – Bienvenido Lumbera, National Artist for Literature
- 2009 – Lazaro A. Francisco, National Artist for Literature
- 2014 – Cirilo F. Bautista, National Artist for Literature
- 2018 - Ramón Larupay Muzones, National Artist for Literature
- 2018 - Resil Buagas Mojares, National Artist for Literature
- 2022 - Gémino Henson Abad, National Artist for Literature

== See also ==
- Filipiniana
- National Book Awards (Philippines)
- List of Filipino writers
- Philippine literature in English
- Philippine literature in Spanish
- Cebuano literature
- Hiligaynon literature
- Ilocano literature
- Pangasinan literature
- Tagalog literature
- Waray literature
- Philippine crime fiction
