= A Child of Sorrow =

1921 novel by Zoilo Galang

A Child of Sorrow is a 1921 novel by the Filipino author Zoilo Galang. It is considered the first Philippine novel written in English. Critics have suggested that the novel was heavily influenced by the sentimentalism of the Tagalog prose narratives of the eighteenth and nineteenth centuries.
