= Waray literature =

Earliest accounts of this literature date back to 1668 when a Spanish Jesuit by the name of Fr. Francisco Ignacio Alzina documented the poetic forms such as the candu, haya, ambahan, canogon, bical, balac, siday and awit. He also described the susumaton and posong, early forms of narratives. Theater tradition was very much in place - in the performance of poetry, rituals, and mimetic dances. Dances mimed the joys and activities of the ancient Waray.

With three centuries of Spanish colonization and another period of American occupation, old rituals, poetic forms and narratives had undergone reinvention. A case in point is the balac, a poetic love joust between a man and a woman. According to Charo N. Cabardo, a Waray Historian, the balac retained its form even as it took new names and borrowed aspects of the languages of the colonizers. During the Spanish period, the balac was called the amoral; during the American occupation, it was renamed ismayling, a term derived from the English word "smile." According to a literary investigator, in certain areas of Samar, the same balac form or ismayling has been reinvented to express anti-imperialist sentiments where the woman represents the motherland and the man, the patriot who professes his love of country.

== The 1900s to the 1950s ==
Modern East Visayan literature, particularly Waray, revolves around poetry and drama produced between the 1900s and the present. The flourishing economy of the region and the appearance of local publications starting in 1901 with the publication of An Kaadlawon, the first Waray newspaper, saw the flourishing of poetry in Waray.

In Samar, Eco de Samar y Leyte, a long running magazine in the 1900s, published articles and literary works in Spanish, Waray and English. A noteworthy feature of this publication was its poetry section, An Tadtaran, which presented a series of satirical poems that attacked the changing values of the people at the time. Eco likewise published occasional and religious poems.

In Leyte, An Lantawan, which has extant copies from 1931 to 1932, printed religious and occasional poetry. It also published satirical poems of Bagong Katipunero, Luro, Datoy Anilod, Marpahol, Vatchoo (Vicente I. de Veyra), Julio Carter (Iluminado Lucente), Ben Tamaka (Eduardo Makabenta), and Kalantas (Casiano Trinchera). Under these pseudonyms, poets criticized corrupt government officials, made fun of people’s vices, and attacked local women for adopting modern ways of social behavior.

With the organization of the Sanghiran san Binisaya in 1909, writers as well as the illustrados in the community banded together for the purpose of cultivating the Waray language. Under the leadership of Norberto Romualdez Sr, Sanghiran's members had literary luminaries that included Iluminado Lucente, Casiano Trinchera, Eduardo Makabenta, Francisco Alvarado, Juan Ricacho, Francisco Infectana, Espiridion Brillo, and statesman and first elected Governor of the Province of Leyte, Jaime C. de Veyra. For a time, Sanghiran was responsible for the impetus it gave to new writing in the language.

The period 1900 to the late fifties witnessed the finest Waray poems of Casiano Trinchera, Iluminado Lucente, Eduardo Makabenta, and the emergence of the poetry of Agustin El O'Mora, Pablo Rebadulla, Tomas Gomez Jr., Filomeno Quimbo Singzon, Estrella Pacuan, Pedro Separa, Francisco Aurillo, and Eleuterio Ramoo. Trinchera, Lucente, and Makabenta were particularly at their best when they wrote satirical poetry.

== Post 1950s ==
The growing acceptance of English as official language in the country strengthened these writers’ loyalty to the ethnic mother tongue as their medium for their art. The publication of Leyte News and The Leader in the twenties, the first local papers in English, brought about the increasing legitimization of English as a medium of communication, the gradual displacement of Waray and eventual disappearance of its poetry from the pages of local publications.

Where local newspapers no longer served as vehicles for written poetry in Waray, the role was assumed by MBC's DYVL and local radio stations in the seventies. Up to the present time, poetry sent to these stations are written mostly by local folk - farmers, housewives, lawyers, government clerks, teachers, and students. A common quality of their poetry is that they tend to be occasional, didactic, and traditional in form. The schooled writers in the region, unlike the local folk poets, do not write in Waray nor Filipino. Most of them write in English although lately there has been a romantic return to their ethnic mother tongue as the medium for their poetry.

Waray drama was once a fixture of town fiestas. Its writing and presentation were usually commissioned by the hermano mayor as part of festivities to entertain the constituents of the town. Town fiestas in a way sustained the work of the playwright. In recent years, this is no longer the case. If ever a play gets staged nowadays, it is essentially drawn from the pool of plays written earlier in the tradition of the hadi-hadi and the zarzuela.

According to Filipinas, an authority on the Waray zarzuela, the earliest zarzuela production involved that of Norberto Romualdez' An Pagtabang ni San Miguel, which was staged in Tolosa, Leyte in 1899. The zarzuela as a dramatic form enthralled audiences for its musicality and dramatic action. Among the noteworthy playwrights of this genre were Norberto Romualdez Sr., Alfonso Cinco, Iluminado Lucente, Emilio Andrada Jr., Francisco Alvarado, Jesus Ignacio, Margarita Nonato, Pedro Acerden, Pedro Separa, Educardo Hilbano, Moning Fuentes, Virgilio Fuentes, and Agustin El O'Mora.

Of these playwrights, Iluminado Lucente stands out in terms of literary accomplishment. He wrote about thirty plays and most of these dealt with domestic conflicts and the changing mores of Waray society during his time. Although a number of his longer works tend to be melodramatic, it was his satirical plays that are memorable for their irony and humor, the tightness of their plot structure, and the specious use of language.

The hadi-hadi antedates the zarzuela in development. It used to be written and staged in many communities of Leyte as part of town fiesta festivities held in honor of a Patron Saint. It generally dealt with Christian and Muslim kingdoms at war. Today one hardly hears about hadi-hadi being staged even in the Cebuano speech communities of the region.

Fiction in Waray has not flourished because it lacks a venue for publication.

== See also ==
- Philippine literature
- Filipiniana
- Philippine National Book Awards
- List of Filipino writers
- Philippine literature in English
- Philippine literature in Spanish
- Cebuano literature
- Ilokano literature
- Hiligaynon literature
- Pangasinan literature
- Tagalog literature
- Waray language
