= Jolico Cuadra =

Filipino poet

A. Z. Jolicco Cuadra (24 May 1939 in Zamboanga City - 30 April 2013 in Calamba) was a poet and artist, art critic, essayist, and short story writer. He was known as the "enfant terrible of Philippine art" in the 1960s, and his good looks and writings dubbed him the Byron of Philippine literature.

He wrote poetry, the art form that he held as the highest form of art, although he also painted and even held a one-man show at Cafe Giorgio in Makati in the 1990s. After his death, some of his poet-friends launched a book of poems on October 24, 2013, entitled Companionable Voices as a tribute to him. The book was a special edition commemorative folio dedicated to Cuadra. The group, composed of major Filipino poets in English from the 1960s, selected a long poem written by Cuadra, a poem of not less than 1,000 lines. Joining his poem in the anthology were poems by César Ruiz Aquino, Recah A. Trinidad, Erwin E. Castillo and Wilfredo Pascua Sanchez.

Cuadra was educated at the Ateneo de Manila University, University of the Philippines, University of the East, art schools in Barcelona, École des Beaux-Arts and Académie de la Grande Chaumière also in Paris.

His awards include First Recipient of the Art Critic of the Philippines Award from the Art Association of the Philippines, 1967; recipient of the Carlos Palanca Memorial Awards for Literature, 1978; and first Filipino recipient of the Southeast Asian Writers Award (SEAWRITE Award) from Queen Sirikit of Thailand, 1979 in Bangkok, Thailand.

Cuadra's other awards include 1983 Cultural Center honorable mention for poetry and 1967 Art Association of the Philippines art criticism award. Cuadra worked as an Art and Editorial Sections columnist for the Manila Chronicle and the Manila Bulletin, from 1964 to 2010, while writing as an essayist and art critic for various publications.

Cuadra's best known poem was "Dogstar." It was included in the Doveglion, a book of Philippine poetry in English edited by National Artist for Literature poet José García Villa.

The poem, "Dogstar," is a short but powerful poem, to quote:

Wing hard, white-stallioned time:
The whirlwind sun upride
Where no sheerer
The crude bird dies.
Hanged in the mind's eye, hold
Fast—shake out
The canines of God
The manbird locked in God's bones
Him dogstar till the phoenix hour
The manbird locked
Till the phoenix hour.

"Dogstar" was anthologized in the iconic Doveglion Book of Philippine Poetry in 1962 and edited by National Artist for Literature poet José García Villa.

As a painter, Cuadra held a one-man show of his paintings which he called "Paintings in Joyous Light" at Cafe Giorgio in Makati in 1996.

== Personal life ==
Cuadra has two sons, Christopher Armin and Jason Leander with wife, Joan Edades. Later in 1974, Cuadra fell in love with a fellow poet, Chiqui Gomez, also known as Auggusta de Almeidda who remained his lifetime partner until his death in 2013. They have a daughter Rajnna Jocelyn.
