= Teresita =

Teresita may refer to:

- Teresita (given name), a feminine given name
- Teresita (genus), a genus of moths in the family Oecophoridae
- Teresita, Missouri, United States, an unincorporated community
- Teresita, Oklahoma, United States, an unincorporated community and census-designated place

== See also ==
- Santa Teresita (disambiguation)
- La Teresita, Cuban cuisine restaurant in Tampa, Florida
