= Iluminado Lucente =

Waray-language poet and playwright

Iluminado Lucente y García (Filipino: Iluminado García Lucente, May 14, 1883 - February 14, 1960) was a Filipino writer, primarily writing poetry and drama in the Waray language. He is considered to be one of the finest writers in the Waray language.

Lucente was a member of the Sanghiran san Binisaya ha Samar ug Leyte (Academy of the Visayan Language of Samar and Leyte). His most famous work is the poem An Iroy Nga Tuna (The Motherland).

Lucente was born on May 14, 1883, into a well-off family in Palo, Leyte. His father was Ciriaco Lucente and his mother was Aurora García. His family's status allowed him to be tutored privately before he attended university in Manila.

In 1906, Lucente established the periodical An Kaadlawon (The Day Break), becoming responsible for the proliferation of Waray literature in the years to come.

He wrote about 30 plays, and was known for both satire using character stereotypes and linguistic humor, which often took the form of plays on language, combining the sounds of Spanish, English and Waray.

== Political career ==
Becoming mayor of Tacloban in 1912, he was elected to the Philippine Congress representing Leyte and later became Secretary to the Governor, then Secretary of the Senate for Senate president Francisco Enage.

== Works ==
=== Poetry ===
- An Iroy Nga Tuna (1945)
- Baga Durogas Ngan Baga Tinuod (1939)
- Hangin Gad La (1960)
- Pilipinas (1904)
- Gugma (1939)
- Panhayhay (Ginsa-aran)
- Bumangon Ka, Pepe! (1909)
- Debelopmental Nga Istorya
- It's Just the Wind.

=== Drama ===
- Abugho (1924)
- An Duha nga Sportsmen (1926)
- Diri Daraga, Diri Balo, Diri Inasaw-an ("Not a Maiden, Not a Widow, Not a Married Woman", 1929)
- Up Limit Pati An Gugma ("Even Love Is Off Limits", 1945)
