= Ilocano literature =

Literature of the Ilocano people of the Philippines

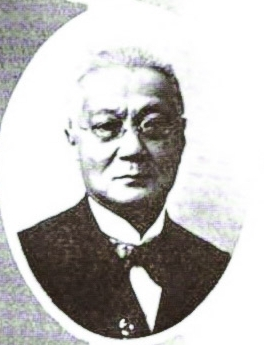
Marcelino Crisólogo popularized Ilocano literature, wrote Mining wenno Ayat ti Kararwa.

Ilocano literature or Iloko literature pertains to the literary works of writers of Ilocano ancestry regardless of the language used - be it Ilocano, English, Spanish or other foreign and Philippine languages. For writers of the Ilocano language, the terms "Iloko" and "Ilocano" are different. Arbitrarily, "Iloko" is the language while "Ilocano" refers to the people or the ethnicity of the people who speak the Iloko language. This distinction of terms however is impractical since a lot of native Ilocanos interchange them practically.

Ilocano literature in the Philippines is one of several regional Philippine literatures. It is one of the most active tributaries to the general Philippine literature, next to Tagalog (Filipino) and Philippine Literature in English.

== History of Iloko literature ==
Ilocanos are an Austronesian language-speaking people. Families and clans arrived by viray or bilog, meaning "boat". The term Ilokano originates from i-, "from", and looc, "cove or bay", thus "people of the bay." Ilokanos also refer to themselves as Samtoy, a contraction from the Ilokano phrase "sao mi ditoy", meaning "our language here".

=== Precolonial to the 19th century ===
Pre-colonial Iloko literature were composed of folk songs, riddles, proverbs, lamentations called dung-aw, and epic stories in written or oral form. Ancient Ilokano poets expressed themselves in folk and war songs as well as the dallot, an improvised, versified and at times impromptu long poem delivered in a sing-song manner.

During the Spanish regime, Iloko poetry was generally patterned after Spanish models. In fact, the earliest known written Iloko poems were the romances translated from Spanish by Francisco Lopez, an Augustinian friar who, in 1621, published his own Iloko translation of the Doctrina Cristiana by Cardinal Bellarmine, the first book to be printed in Iloko.

A study of Iloko poetry could be found in the Gramatica Ilokana, published in 1895, based on Lopez's Arte de la Lengua Iloca, earlier published in 1627, but was probably written before 1606.

Some Iloko writers credit Pedro Bucaneg, who collaborated with Lopez in the translation of the Doctrina into Iloko, for having been the first known Ilokano poet, and as the "Father of Ilokano Poetry and Literature." Bucaneg, blind since childhood, authored the popular epic known as Biag ni Lam-ang ("Life of Lam-ang") written in the 17th century. The earliest written form of the epic poem was given by Fr. Gerardo Blanco to Isabelo de los Reyes, who published it in El Ilocano from December 1889 to February 1890, with Spanish translation in prose, and also reprinted it in his El Folklore Filipino, under the title Vida de Lam-ang.

Ilocano literature developed in many ways. During the 18th century, the missionaries used religious as well as secular literatures among other means to advance their mission of converting the Ilokanos to Christianity. The century also saw the publication of religious works like Fr. Jacinto Rivera's Sumario de las Indulgencias de la Santa Correa in 1719 and the Pasion, a translation of St. Vincent Ferrer's sermons into Iloko by Fr. Antonio Mejia in 1845.

The 19th century also became the origin of feminist writings in the Philippines through Leona Florentino (1849-1884), the mother of Philippine women's literature, who is known for crafting the “bridge” from oral tradition to written poetry in Philippine literature. An outstanding dramatist, spoken word poet, and the first foundational poet in Philippine feminism and lesbian literature, her works, which flow through a distinctly Vigan oral style that she espoused, have been honored internationally, as well by literary experts in the country.

Fr. Justo Claudio Fojas, an Ilokano secular priest who wrote novenas, prayerbooks, catechism, metrical romances, dramas, biographies, a Spanish grammar and an Iloko-Spanish dictionary, was Leona Florentino's contemporary.

Isabelo de los Reyes, Leona's son, himself wrote poems, stories, folklore, studies, and seemingly interminable religious as well as political articles. The achievement of both Claudio Fojas and de los Reyes is possibly more significant than the critical reader of Iloko literature today is ready to admit.

The comedia, otherwise known as the moro-moro, and the zarzuela were presented for the first time in the Ilocos in the 19th century. The comedia, a highly picturesque presentation of the wars between Christians and Muslims, and the zarzuela, an equally picturesque depiction of what is at once melodrama, comic-opera, and the skit interminably preoccupied with the eternal theme of boy-meets-girl-who-always-live-happily-ever-after-against-seemingly-impossible-odds are still as popular today as they were when first staged in the Ilocos.

The comedia was scripted from the corridos like Principe Don Juan, Ari Esteban ken Reyna Hipolita, Doce Paris, Bernardo Carpio, Jaime del Prado. Marcelino Mena Crisologo helped popularize the zarzuela based on the culture and tradition of the Ilokanos particularly those in Vigan, Ilocos Sur. So did Pascual Agcaoili y Guerrero (1880–1958) of Ilocos Norte who wrote and staged "Daguiti Agpaspasukmon Basi," and Isaias R. Lazo (1887–1983) of San Vicente, Ilocos Sur who wrote comedia and zarzuela.

The year 1892 saw the printing for the first time of the first Iloko novel, written by Fr. Rufino Redondo, an Augustinian friar, titled "Matilde de Sinapangan." Another Iloko novel which was written before the end of the 19th century by one Don Quintin Alcid was "Ayat, Kaanonto Ngata?" ("Love, When Shall it Be?").

Video compact discs of some popular Ilocano folk songs. After, the Tagalogs, the Ilocanos has the best preserved repertoire of folk songs in the Philippines.

Arturo Centeno of Vigan, Ilocos Sur, also wrote three novels titled Apay a Di Mangasawa? ("Why Doesn't He Get Married?"), Dispensara and Padi a Puraw Wenno Naamo a Kibin ("A White Priest or a Good Guide").

=== 21st century literature ===
The 20th century was comparatively more intense in literary activity. Some of the literature in this period are "Biag ti Maysa a Lakay, Wenno Nakaam-ames a Bales" ("Life of an Old Man, or a Dreadful Revenge") by Mariano Gaerlan (1909); "Uray Narigat no Paguimbagan" ("Improvement Despite Obstacles") by Facundo Madriaga (1911); "Mining Wenno Ayat ti Cararua" ("Mining or Spiritual Love") by Marcelino Peña Crisologo (1914); "Nasam-it ken Narucbos nga Sabong dagiti Dardarepdep ti Agbaniaga" ("Sweet and Fresh Flower of a Traveller's Dreams") by Marcos E. Millon (1921); "Sabsabong ken Lulua" ("Flowers and Tears") by R. Respicio (1930); "Apay a Pinatayda ni Naw Simon?" ("Why Did They Kill Don Simon?") first known detective novel in Iloko by Leon C. Pichay (1935); "Puso ti Ina" ("A Mother's Heart") by Leon C. Pichay (1936).

When the Bannawag magazine, a sister publication of Liwayway, Bisaya and Hiligaynon, hit the streets on Nov. 3, 1934, Iloko literature reached a headland. Many Ilokanos started to write literary pieces.

The early Bannawag short stories showed sustained growth. The short stories written in the 1920s were poor imitations of equally poor American fiction. Early short story writers had practically no literary background in their attempts.

The growth of the short story was not apparent until Bannawag resumed publication in 1947. Most of the stories published dealt with themes of war; guerrilla activities, Japanese atrocities, murder, pillage and death. By the latter part of the decade, writers of different ages emerged, and from their ranks came stories that were less verbose, tighter, and with more credible characterization than those written previously.

While many articles have been written by Ilokanos and non-Ilokanos about the Ilocos Region, few scholarly studies have been conducted. Among these scholars were Leopoldo Y. Yabes of the University of the Philippines, who made a brief survey of Iloko literature in 1934. His findings showed that Iloko literature began with Pedro Bucaneg.

In 1940, Thomas B. Alcid of the University of Santo Tomas made a study on the Iloko prose fiction and discussed the Iloko short story and the Iloko novel and their possibilities in Philippine literature. His study showed that the short stories and novels at that time were still young and needed more improvement.

In 1954, Mercedes F. Guerrero of the Manuel L. Quezon Educational Institution (now MLQU) made a masteral thesis titled "Critical Analysis of the Outstanding Iloco Short Stories Published in the Bannawag from 1948 to 1952." Her findings showed that the Iloko stories offer a mine of information about the ideals and customs of the Filipino people. In the display of emotions and feelings, the Iloko author has been free or spontaneous in dealing with the life he portrayed. Most often he has been compassionate with his characters. He has treated a wide variety of subjects that there is no important place of Filipino life that has not been depicted. There are stories on mere trifling matters as well as their own nation-slaking subjects. These are stories about persons, about animals, about places and about events.

Guerrero also found out that the Ilokano author served his society by: 1.) Preserving the ideals, customs and traditions of the people. 2.) Bringing out the social consciousness of the era—its mood, conflicts, struggles, and rehabilitation. 3.) Awakening man's sensibilities to the joys, sorrows, loves, hatreds and jealousies of the people. 4.) Casting away sectional sentiments and prejudices and bringing about fuller understanding of the different ethnic groups.

A related literature published by Dr. Marcelino A. Foronda, Jr. in 1967, titled "Dallang: An Introduction to Philippine Literature in Iloko," discussed the traits and characteristics of the Ilokanos. Of their literature, he stated: "...The Ilokano language is so highly developed as to have produced the greatest number of printed works in any Philippine language, next to Tagalog.

Bannawag has played and still plays a major role in the development of Iloko literature. At present, it publishes poems (daniw), short stories (sarita), novels (nobela), essays (salaysay), comics, biographies, folktales and many others including what some call avant garde literary output. It is the only magazine where Ilokano writers hope to publish most of their writings.

During the magazine's infancy years in the 1930s, most of its contents were translations from the Liwayway magazine save a novel by Hermogenes F. Belen titled "Nadaraan a Linnaaw" (Blood-stained Dew) which was serialized in 1947. Other writers at that time included Benjamin M. Pascual, David D. Campañano, Godofredo S. Reyes, Benito de Castro, Jose P. Acance, Benjamin Gray, Marcelino A. Foronda, Jr.

In the 1960s, poems, short stories and novels published by the Bannawag became better — in craftsmanship, development of plots and themes, among others. Writers by then, most of whom were college students and professionals, had a bigger library of literary books.

To help in the development of the Iloko short story, Bannawag launched a writing contest in 1961. The judges were Prof. Santiago Alcantara of the National University, Prof. Angel C. Anden of the Manuel L. Quezon University, and Dr. Marcelino A. Foronda, Jr. of the De La Salle University-Manila. This contest lasted until 1970. One of the judges said the quality of Iloko short stories was competitive with those written in English. Before the martial-law era, most of the poems, stories and novels dwelt on political unrest and protests, like rallies and demonstrations by students, professionals and workers against the government. (From an essay by Jose A. Bragado. Bragado is one of the foremost writers in contemporary Ilokano literature. He is a former literary editor of Bannawag magazine and past president of GUMIL, an international association of Ilokano writers.)

== Future of Ilocano literature ==
Ilokano writers have also published their works in foreign countries. One of the most popular authors of Ilocano ancestry abroad was the late Carlos Bulosan, a California immigrant born to Ilokano parents in Pangasinan. And currently, the most internationally translated Filipino author is an Ilokano from Rosales, Pangasinan—Francisco Sionil Jose, popularly known as F. Sionil Jose. He is famous for his Rosales saga, a five-novel work about an Ilokano clan, virtually documenting Philippine history from Spanish time to the years of the Marcos administration. The novels, translated in about 22 languages, are circulated and read around the world.

Back home, many Iloko writers have won major prizes in the annual Palanca Awards, the most prestigious and most anticipated of all literary contests in the Philippines. These famous winners' names include Reynaldo A. Duque, Ricarte Agnes, Aurelio S. Agcaoili, Lorenzo G. Tabin, Jaime M. Agpalo Jr., Prescillano N. Bermudez, William V. Alvarado, Maria Fres-Felix, Clarito G. de Francia, Arnold Pascual Jose, Eden Aquino Alviar, Severino Pablo, Ariel S. Tabag, Daniel L. Nesperos, Roy V. Aragon, Danilo Antalan, Joel B. Manuel, Bernardo D. Tabbada, Noli S. Dumlao and others.

Clarito G. de Francia expanded his writings by composing songs in English, when he immigrated to the U.S. His first work "Fil-Am Song" deals with the pursuit of Filipino-Americans' struggles in the green fields and their triumphs in great cities. This is followed by "Loyalty for Our Country and Humanity," a tribute to America as a sanctuary of migrants. President Barack Obama reacted to this work: "...We should be proud of what we have accomplished together...It’s the optimism and hard work of people like you that have changed our country for the better..." After that, come "Today is Your Special" a birthday greetings; "Home Sweet Home" an upliftment of family togetherness; "Celebrate a Recommitment" an anniversary song; "Live and Share Christ to the World" for evangelization, etc. These pieces show De Francia's way of encouraging his fellow Filipinos to impart their heritage, culture and traditions to the world. As a bridge for this idea, he has been sponsoring a short story writing contest in English, the DEfrancia Awards for Literature(DEAL), since 2017.

== GUMIL (Gunglo dagiti Mannurat nga Ilokano) ==
On October 19, 1968, GUMIL Filipinas (Ilokano Writers Association of the Philippines) was organized in Baguio. Arturo M. Padua, then mayor of Sison, Pangasinan, was elected president. The officers took their oath of office before President Ferdinand E. Marcos.

GUMIL Filipinas or Gunglo dagiti Mannurat nga Ilokano iti Filipinas, Inc., was incorporated and registered with the Philippine Securities and Exchange Commission on January 8, 1977.

GUMIL Filipinas' main objectives are:

- To provide a forum in which Ilokano writers can undertake common and cooperative efforts to improve their craft of writing literary, historical, research and other works;
- To enrich Ilokano literature and cultural heritage as phases of the national identity by encouraging the members to concentrate on writing extensively and intensively about the social, economic, cultural and other aspects of growth and development among the Ilokanos through literature, history, research, or the like;
- To publish books of poetry, short stories, essays, novels, historical accounts, research and critical studies, and other writings; and
- To assist each member in pursuing his/her writing career and in fulfilling his life as a member of Philippines society.

(Excerpted from an essay by Jose A. Bragado)

== Notable works ==
- Biag ni Lam-ang – a pre-colonial epic poem; first translated into English in September 1916
- Pasion de Nuestro Señor Jesucristo (1621) – the first Ilocano pasyon and the first Philippine language pasyon overall, written by Antonio Mejia and published in 1845
- Sumario de las Indulgencias de la Santa Correa (1719) – an Ilocano book written by Jacinto Rivera
- Castora Benigna (before 1884) – a poem by Leona Florentino
- Leon XIII (before 1884) – a poem by Leona Florentino dedicated to Pope Leo XIII
- To a Young Woman on Her Birthday (before 1884) – a poem by Leona Florentino
- Matilde de Sinapangan (1892) – possibly the first Ilocano-language novel, written by Spanish Augustinian priest Rufino Redondo
- Ti Langit ti Inanamatayo – The first Ilokano short story, written by Isabelo de los Reyes
- Biag ti Maysa a Lacay Oenno Nacaam-ames a Bales (1909) – a novel by Mariano Gaerlan
- Sangcareppet a Dandaniw (1926) – possibly the first Ilocano anthology of poems
- Dagiti Balud (late 1940s) - a novel by Hermogenes F. Belen
- Sasainnec (1948) – the first Ilocano novel by a female author, Estela Rimorin-Gordo

== See also ==
- Category:Ilocano-language writers
- Philippine literature
- El Ilocano (magazine)
- Filipiniana
- National Book Awards (Philippines)
- List of Filipino writers
- List of Tagalog literary works
- Philippine literature in English
- Philippine literature in Spanish
- Cebuano literature
- Hiligaynon literature
- Pangasinan literature
- Waray literature
