= Santa Teresita =

Santa Teresita may refer to:

- Santa Teresita, Buenos Aires, Atlantic coastal holiday resort in La Costa Partido, Argentina
- Santa Teresita, a village in Cayo District, Belize
- Santa Teresita, Batangas, Philippines
- Santa Teresita, Cagayan, Philippines
- Thérèse of Lisieux, a saint venerated in the Roman Catholic Church

== See also ==
- Teresita (disambiguation)
