= Adarna House =

Philippine publishing house

Adarna House, Inc.
- Status: Active
- Founded: 1980
- Founder: Virgilio S. Almario
- Country of origin: Philippines
- Headquarters location: Quezon City
- Distribution: Nationwide
- Key people: Emelina B. Soriano-Almario, President and General Manager
- Publication types: Books and other educational printed materials
- Fiction genres: Both fiction and non-fiction
- Official website: adarna.com.ph

Adarna House, Inc. is a Philippine company engaged in the publication of local literature for children of all ages. The company is headquartered in Quezon City in metropolitan Manila.

== History ==
During the mid-1970s, the Nutrition Center of the Philippines (NCP), an organization, which primarily addresses malnutrition in the country, recognized not only the physical deficiency of the Filipino children but also the need for a feeding program that would enrich their mental ability. Virgilio S. Almario, a renowned poet and literary critic of that time, was consigned to create series of storybooks for this project. He gathered authors, editors, illustrators, and researchers, which he would call Aklat Adarna.

The Adarna bird is a mythical character known for its ability to cure illnesses with its song. Just like this bird, Aklat Adarna then served education to the Filipinos to heal their illiteracy due to poverty.

Later on, the government organization concluded the program, yet Almario persisted and collaborated with Children's Communication Center (CCC). Adarna Book Services was established to distribute and publish storybooks for CCC. Today, renamed as Adarna House, Inc., the publishing company works with different organizations, producing learning materials for children of all ages, and is continuously reaching out to feed the Filipino minds.

== Products ==
=== Activity books ===
Adarna House Inc. publishes learning tools that can help teachers and parents in guiding their children how to count, color, draw basic figures and identify symbols. Some of the publishing house's activity books are the Sanayang Adarna series, a mixture of coloring, writing, drawing, and counting worksheets, and Magkulay Tayo series which primarily aims to teach children how to hold writing materials.

On its 35th anniversary, Adarna House Inc. published Weewoo, an art activity book which features favorite characters from 35 different books from the company.

=== Big books ===
The classic storybooks published by Adarna House Inc. are also produced in larger formats. These big books are used for storytelling sessions with greater number of audience. The company also produces lesson plan and worksheet compilations that teachers can use as guide to effectively process the story told to the children.

As of 2018, fifty-four (54) big books are being sold in bookstores.

=== Board Book ===
Adarna House Inc. started with a collection of five (5) posters for preschool to help teachers educate the children. In 2007, the company released the Ready for School series, which consists of ten (10) flipbooks with Filipino and English text discussing preschool concepts.

In partnership with Reach Out and Read Philippines, the company published the very first English-Filipino board books in the country.

These board books teaches a child basic words and concepts like colors, numbers, alphabets, position, emotions, and the like. Several board books of Adarna House Inc. today subtly instill Filipino culture in the children's minds- like Kakanin! which features the different Filipino snacks made from rice and Bahay Kubo, the Filipino folk song about vegetables.

More importantly, board books are designed to teach children how to hold a book.

=== Comics ===
In the early 2000s, Adarna House Inc. started an imprint, Anino Comics, which first consisted only of Mythology Class and After Eden by Arnold Arre. On the 35th year of the company, the comic line was revived and six (6) books were published in that year. Four of which, namely Kare-Kare Comics, Janus Silang at Ang Tiyanak ng Tabon, Sixty Six, and Light, were finalists in the National Book Awards by the National Book Development Board (NBDB).

In 2017, Emiliana Kampilan again stirred and challenged Philippine comics upon the release of her book, Dead Balagtas. Its first volume is awarded as the Best Philippine Comics of 2017 by CNN Philippines Life.

=== Intermediate Readers ===
Adarna House published its first teen novellas, Jacobo’s Ghost, Mga Ako, and Sup?, under Pilar Perez Medallion for Young Adult Literature in 2001. In 2014, the company tried to revive the genre and published four (4) new books that year. This includes Supremo and Janus Silang at Ang Tiyanak ng Tabon, which are winners of the National Children's Books Awards. In 2017, the third installment of the Supremo Series was released.

=== Novels ===
Adarna House Inc. publishes translations of classic Filipino novels such as Noli Me Tangere, El Filibusterismo and Florante and Laura. Aside from these, the company also has novels about love, culture, and fantasy. This includes the Janus Silang series, the basis of the graphic novel, which won several awards like Juan C. Laya Prize for Best Novel in a Philippine Language. The e-book version of Woman in a Frame won the 2nd Filipino Readers’ Choice Awards 2013 Novel in English.

=== Poetry ===
Adarna House Inc. teaches children concepts, words and rhymes using poetry books. These books, Buwan, Buwang Bulawan, and May Darating na Trak Bukas are written by renowned writer and National Artist, Rio Alma. The latter was recognized at the 2014 National Children's Book Awards as a Finalist and received the Kid's choice award.

=== Non-fiction ===
Aside from the fictional stories that Adarna is known to offer, the company also has informational materials that discusses more difficult concepts like science. Among these are Can We Live On Mars?, Can We Drink the Ocean?, and Can We Live Without Trees? There are also books that teaches basic information about architecture, history, social studies, food, etc.

=== Storybooks ===
Aklat Adarna published eight (8) pocket-sized and landscape-format storybooks in 1997. The titles included Istorya ni Dodong (The Story of Dodong) in two parts, Si Pilar Katerpilar (Pilar the Caterpillar), and Ang Pag-ibig ni Mariang Makiling (The Love of Mariang Makiling). The titles that are still in print are Digong Dilaw (Yellow Digo), Munting Patak-Ulan (Little Raindrop), Nang Magkakulay ang Nayon (When Color Came to Town), and Si Emang Engkantada at ang Tatlong Haragan (Emang the Enchantress and the Three Rascals). Nang Magkakulay ang Nayon relaunched in 2010 with English text and a Cebuano translation- a first in Adarna House history.

The first few books by Adarna House Inc. were compilations of short stories in the form of fables, myths, and legends. Later on, there were explorations in characters, settings, and plots. Some of the storybooks that are still being told to today's generation are Ang Barumbadong Bus, Ang Pambihirang Buhok ni Raquel, Ang Mahiyaing Manok and Xilef. Adarna's books do not just teach values- what to do or not to do, but it also challenges the children's minds with the issues presented in each story.

Digital books/ e-books of the publishing house are now also available through the BuriBooks application, where children can read their favorite stories while learning interactively. Applications that are based on books like Ang Pambihirang Buhok ni Raquel and Araw ng Palengke are also made available online by the Adarna House Digital.

=== Learning Tools ===
Adarna House Inc. offers learning tools to help children appreciate and improve on the use of Filipino language. In 2012, the publishing house developed WiKAHON- a box with cards that contains exercises to develop vocabulary and reading comprehension.

The publishing house also produces posters/charts to help children identify figures. There are also manuals to help teachers and parents on storytelling and creating activities to help children process the lesson.

== Services ==
Adarna House Inc.’s main office is located in Quezon City. The office also serves as a bookshop where people, especially children, can browse and buy the company’s products.

To further reach out to Filipino children, the company participates in book fairs in different schools and institutions.

The publishing house also conducts storytelling session called Kuwentong Adarna, spearheaded by Adarna Group Foundation Inc. (AGFI) and the company’s pool of storytellers. AGFI focuses on engaging with local government units to implement literacy project for children.

Adarna House Inc. also ties with The Raya School to provide progressive learning from preschool to high school.

Adarna House also facilitates summer workshops called Klasrum Adarna, which teaches kids how to write and draw; while workshops for adults, particularly teachers and parents, trains them to story tell, teach beginning reading, and improve the library, among others.

Adarna House Inc. recently launched their Quiz Bee competition, entitled Patinikan sa Panitikan, which is about Filipino literature. The contest is participated by seventy (70) schools nationwide.

They also offer book development services for institutions that would like to commission the production of a book project. The services include copy writing, editing, research, illustration, art direction, and printing.

== Awards ==
Several of Adarna House's books have won awards in the Philippines and internationally.

=== Philippine awards and recognition ===
Institution	Year	Award	Title	Author	Illustrator	In print
Catholic Press Award	1981	winner	Patrolman Ngiyaw	Rene O. Villanueva	Renato Gamos	NO
Filipino Readers' Choice Award	2012	Winner, Picture Book Category	But that Won't Wake me Up	Annie Dennise Lumbao, Anelka Lumbao	Liza Flores	YES
Gawad Ceres Alabado	1998	winner	Ang Panganay	Felice Prudente Sta. Maria	Albert E. Gamos	NO
Gawad Surian ng Wikang Pambansa	1982	winner	Patrolman Ngiyaw	Rene O. Villanueva	Renato Gamos	NO
Gintong Aklat Award	1981	winner	Patrolman Ngiyaw	Rene O. Villanueva	Renato Gamos	NO
Gintong Aklat Award	2000	Award for Children's and Young Readers' Literature	Si Ching na Takot sa Dilim	Aleli Dew Batnag	Paul Eric Roca	YES
Gintong Aklat Award	2000	Award for Children's and Young Readers' Literature	Chenelyn! Chenelyn!	Rhandee Garlitos	Liza Flores	YES
Gintong Aklat Award	2001	Runner-up for Children's and Young Readers' Literature	Si Pilandok, ang Bantay-Kalikasan	Virgilio S. Almario	Kora Dandan-Albano	YES
Gintong Aklat Award	2002	Award for Children's and Young Readers' Literature	Abot Mo Ba Ang Tainga Mo?	Heidi Emily Eusebio-Abad	Jose Miguel Tejido	NO
Gintong Aklat Award	2004	Runner-up for Children's and Young Readers' Literature	Ang Madyik Silya ni Titoy	Russell Molina	Marcus Nada	YES
Gintong Aklat Award	2004	Award for Children's and Young Readers' Literature	Si Dindo Pundido	Jomike Tejido	Jomike Tejido	YES
Gintong Aklat Award	2006	Runner-up for Children's and Young Readers' Literature	Polliwog's Wiggle	Heidi Emily Eusebio-Abad	Beth Parrocha-Doctolero	YES
Gintong Aklat Award	2006	Award for Children's and Young Readers' Literature	100 Questions Filipino Kids Ask Volume I		Abi Goy, Liza Flores, Paul Eric Roca, Isabel Roxas, Bernie Sim	YES
National Book Awards	1998	Award for Children's Literature	Mayroon Akong Alagang Puno	Carla M. Pacis, translation by Danilo M. Reyes	Mariano Ching	NO
National Book Awards	1999	Award for Children's Literature	Ang Pamana ni Andres Bonifacio	Emmanuel Encarnacion	Photos by Nestor Rivera	NO
National Book Awards	1999	Best Design, Best Book for History	100 Events that Shaped the Philippines	Edited by Emelina S. Almario, et al.		NO
National Book Awards	2002	Award for Children's Literature	Ang Pambihirang Buhok ni Lola	Rene Villanueva	Ibarra Crisostomo	YES
National Book Awards	2002	Best Young Adult Literature	Anina ng mga Alon	Eugene Y. Evasco		YES
National Book Awards	2005	Special Citation for Children's Literature	Si Diwayen, Noong Bago Dumating ang mga Espanyol	Augie Rivera	Paolo Lim	YES
National Book Awards	2005	Special Citation for Children's Literature	Si Jhun-Jhun, Noong Bago Ideklara ang Batas Militar	Augie Rivera	Brian Vallesteros	YES
National Book Awards	2005	Special Citation for Children's Literature	Si Juanito, Noong Panahon ng mga Amerikano	Augie Rivera	Jose Miguel Tejido	YES
National Book Awards	2005	Special Citation for Children's Literature	Si Pitong, Noong Panahon ng mga Hapon	Augie Rivera	Marcus Nada	YES
National Book Awards	2005	Special Citation for Children's Literature	Si Segunda, Noong Panahon ng mga Espanyol	Augie Rivera	Pepper Roxas	YES
National Book Awards	2006	Award for Children's Literature	The Yellow Paperclip with Bright Purple Spots	Nikki Dy-Liacco	May Ann Licudine	YES
National Book Awards	2006	Award for Children's Literature	The Cat Painter	Becky Bravo	Mark Ramsel Salvatus III	YES
National Book Awards	2007	Award for Children's Literature	The Boy Who Touched Heaven	Iris Gem Li	Sergio Bumatay III	NO
National Book Awards	2008	Best Translation	El Filibusterismo	Translation by Virgilio S. Almario		YES
National Book Awards	2008	Best Translation	Noli Me Tangere	Translation by Virgilio S. Almario		YES
National Book Awards	2012	Best Leisure Book	100 Questions Filipino Kids Ask Volume II			YES
National Book Awards	2014	Best Graphic Literature in Filipino	PilandoKomiks: Mga Pagsubok sa Karagatan	Borg Sinaban	Borg Sinaban	YES
National Book Awards	2015	Best Novel in a Philippine Language	Si Janus Sílang at ang Tiyanak ng Tábon	Edgar Calabia Samar		YES
National Children's Book Awards	2010	Best Read for Kids	Araw sa Palengke	May Tobias-Papa	Isabel Roxas	YES
National Children's Book Awards	2010	Best Read for Kids	Can We Live on Mars?	Gidget Roceles-Jimenez	Bru Sim	YES
National Children's Book Awards	2010	Best Read for Kids	Just Add Dirt	Becky Bravo	Jason Moss	YES
National Children's Book Awards	2014	Save the Children/First Read Award	Bahay Kubo		Pergylene Acuña	YES
National Children's Book Awards	2014	Kids' Choice Award Finalist	May Darating na Trak Bukas	Rio Alma	Sergio Bumatay III	YES
National Children's Book Awards	2014	Best Read for Kids	Hating Kapatid	Raissa Rivera Falgui	Fran Alvarez	YES
National Children's Book Awards	2014	Best Read for Kids	Ngumiti si Andoy	Xi Zuq	Dominic Agsaway	YES
National Children's Book Awards	2014	Best Read for Kids	The Little Girl in a Box	Felinda V. Bagas	Aldy C. Aguirre	YES
National Children's Book Awards	2014	Best Read for Kids	What Kids Should Know About Andres and the Katipunan	Weng D. Cahiles	Isa N. Natividad	YES
National Children's Book Awards	2016	Kids' Choice Award Finalist	Marvino's League of Superheroes	Rae Rival-Cosico	Jamie Bauza	YES
National Children's Book Awards	2016	Kids' Choice Award Finalist	Nawawala si Muningning	Michael M. Coroza	Tokwa S. Peñaflorida	YES
National Children's Book Awards	2016	Best Read for Kids	Dumaan si Butiki	Gigi Constantino	Ray Nazarene Sunga	YES
National Children's Book Awards	2016	Best Read for Kids	Haluhalo		Eli F. Camacho	YES
National Children's Book Awards	2016	Best Read for Kids	Salusalo para Kay Kuya	Ergoe Tinio	JC Galag	YES
National Children's Book Awards	2016	Best Read for Kids	Si Janus Sílang at ang Tiyanak ng Tábon	Edgar Calabia Samar		YES
National Children's Book Awards	2016	Best Read for Kids	Supremo	Xi Zuq	Al Estrella	YES

Some of Adarna House's books also bear medals awarded to the work prior to publication.

Institution	Year	Award	Title	Author	Illustrator	In print
Carlos Palanca Memorial Awards for Literature	1992	First Prize, Short Story for Children (Filipino Division)	Nemo, Ang Batang Papel	Rene O. Villanueva	Haru H. Sabijon	NO
Carlos Palanca Memorial Awards for Literature	1995	First Prize, Short Story for Children (Filipino Division)	Papel de Liha	Ompong Remigio	Beth Parrocha-Doctolero	YES
Carlos Palanca Memorial Awards for Literature	1995	Second Prize, Short Story for Children	Estrellita the Little Wishing Star	May M. Tobias	Mary M. Tobias	YES
Carlos Palanca Memorial Awards for Literature	1996	Third Prize, Short Story for Children (Filipino Division)	Ang Mahiyaing Manok	Rebecca T. Añonuevo	Ruben de Jesus	YES
Carlos Palanca Memorial Awards for Literature	1999	Third Prize, Short Story for Children (Filipino Division)	Xilef	Augie Rivera	Beth Parrocha-Doctolero	YES
Carlos Palanca Memorial Awards for Literature	1999	Second Prize, Short Story for Children	Magnificent Benito and His Two Front Teeth	Augie Rivera, Mike Rivera	Jason Moss	YES
Carlos Palanca Memorial Awards for Literature	2003	First Prize, Short Story for Children	The Greediest of Rajahs and the Whitest of Clouds	Honoel Ibardolaza	Brian Vallesteros	YES
Carlos Palanca Memorial Awards for Literature	2004	First Prize, Short Story for Children	The Cat Painter	Becky Bravo	Mark Ramsel Salvatus III	YES
Carlos Palanca Memorial Awards for Literature	2009	First Prize, Short Story for Children (Filipino Division)	Mahabang-Mahabang-Mahaba	Genaro R. Gojo Cruz	A. Ghani Bautista Madueño	YES
Carlos Palanca Memorial Awards for Literature	2013	Third Prize, Short Story for Children (Filipino Division)	Salusalo para Kay Kuya	Ergoe Tinio	JC Galag	YES
Carlos Palanca Memorial Awards for Literature	2013	First Prize, Short Story for Children	Marvino's League of Superheroes	Rae Rival-Cosico	Jamie Bauza	YES
Philippine Board on Books for Young People	1984	Illustrators' Prize	Ang Kamatis ni Peles	Virgilio S. Almario	Renato Gamos	YES
Philippine Board on Books for Young People	1993	Illustrators' Prize	Terengati, Ang Binatang Nag-asawa ng Diwatang Tagalangit	Victoria Añonuevo	Nikhus Katindoy	NO
Philippine Board on Books for Young People	1994	Illustrators' Prize	Nemo, Ang Batang Papel	Rene O. Villanueva	Haru H. Sabijon	NO
Philippine Board on Books for Young People	1995	Salanga Prize & Alcala Prize	Bru-ha-ha-ha-ha-ha...Bru-hi-hi-hi-hi-hi	Ma. Corazon Remigio	Roland Mechael Ilagan	YES
Philippine Board on Books for Young People	1995	Salanga Prize Finalist	Alamat ng Ampalaya	Augie D. Rivera	Kora D. Albano	YES
Philippine Board on Books for Young People	1996	Salanga Prize & Alcala Prize	Ang Itim na Kuting	Natasha Vizcarra	Ferdinand Guevara	YES
Philippine Board on Books for Young People	1997	Salanga Prize & Alcala Prize	Federico	Eugene Y. Evasco	Paul Eric Roca	NO
Philippine Board on Books for Young People	1997	Salanga Prize Honorable Mention	Chenelyn! Chenelyn!	Rhandee Garlitos	Liza Flores	YES
Philippine Board on Books for Young People	1997	Salanga Prize Honorable Mention	Ang Bisikleta ni Momon	Rebecca T. Añonuevo	Jo Ann A. Bereber	YES
Philippine Board on Books for Young People	1998	Salanga Prize Honorable Mention	Ang Pambihirang Buhok ni Raquel (BP)	Luis P. Gatmaitan	Beth Parrocha-Doctolero	YES
Philippine Board on Books for Young People	1998	Salanga Prize & Alcala Prize	Mayroon Akong Alagang Puno	Carla M. Pacis, translation by Danilo M. Reyes	Mariano Ching	NO
Philippine Board on Books for Young People	1999	Salanga Prize & Alcala Prize	Ang Tatlong Kahilingan ni Julian	Rebecca Añonuevo	Breiner Medina	NO
Philippine Board on Books for Young People	1999	Salanga Prize Honorable Mention	Misteryo!	Eugene Y. Evasco	Avid Liongoren	NO
Philippine Board on Books for Young People	2000	Salanga Prize & Alcala Prize	Nasaan Si Kuya Emil?	Germaine Yia	Michael Adrao	NO
Philippine Board on Books for Young People	2001	Salanga Prize & Alcala Prize	Bakit Matagal Ang Sundo Ko?	Kristine Canon	Mariano Ching	YES
Philippine Board on Books for Young People	2002	Salanga Prize & Alcala Prize	Uuwi na ang Nanay kong si Darna!	Edgar Samar	Russell Molina	NO
Philippine Board on Books for Young People	2002	Salanga Prize Honorable Mention	When I Cross the Street	Lin Acacio-Flores	Moose Maravilla	NO
Philippine Board on Books for Young People	2003	Salanga Prize & Alcala Prize	Sandosenang Kuya	Russell Molina	Hubert Fucio	NO
Philippine Board on Books for Young People	2004	Salanga Prize & Alcala Prize	Papa's House, Mama's House	Jean Lee C. Patindol	Mark Salvatus III	YES
Philippine Board on Books for Young People	2005	Salanga Prize & Alcala Prize	The Yellow Paperclip with Bright Purple Spots	Nikki Dy-Liacco	May Ann Licudine	YES
Philippine Board on Books for Young People	2007	Salanga Prize & Alcala Prize	Tight Times	Jeanette C. Patindol	Sergio T. Bumatay III	YES
Philippine Board on Books for Young People	2008	Salanga Prize & Alcala Prize	Naku, Nakuu, Nakuuu!	Nanoy Rafael	Sergio Bumatay III	YES
Philippine Board on Books for Young People	2009	Salanga Prize & Alcala Prize	May Higante sa Aming Bahay	Rhandee Garlitos	Ferdinand Guevara	YES
Philippine Board on Books for Young People	2012	Salanga Prize Honorable Mention	The Little Girl in a Box	Felinda V. Bagas	Aldy C. Aguirre	YES
Philippine Board on Books for Young People	2012	Salanga Prize & Alcala Prize	Ano'ng Gupit Natin Ngayon?	Russell Molina	Hubert Fucio	NO
Philippine Board on Books for Young People	2013	Salanga Prize & Alcala Prize	Ngumiti si Andoy	Xi Zuq	Dominic Agsaway	YES

=== International awards and recognition ===
Institution	Year	Award	Title	Author	Illustrator	In print
Biennial of Illustrations Bratislava	1983	Honorable Mention	Beberoca	Virgilio Almario	Jose Tence Ruiz	NO
International Board on Books for Young People	2005	Outstanding Book for Young People with Disabilities	Xilef	Augie Rivera	Beth Parrocha-Doctolero	YES
International Board on Books for Young People	2004	Honour List	Sandosenang Kuya	Russell Molina	Hubert Fucio	NO
IBBY Sweden - Peter Pan Prize	2013	Winner	Naku, Nakuu, Nakuuu!	Nanoy Rafael	Sergio Bumatay III	YES
Noma Concours for Picture Book Illustrations	1998	2nd prize	Sundalong Patpat	Virgilio Almario	Ferdinand Doctolero	NO
Noma Concours for Picture Book Illustrations	1992	Runner-up	Pandaguan, Bakit Namamatay ang Tao	Virgilio Almario	Albert Gamos	NO
Noma Concours for Picture Book Illustrations	2002	Encouragement Prize	Ang Mahiyaing Manok	Rebecca Añonuevo	Ruben de Jesus	YES
Noma Concours for Picture Book Illustrations	2008	Encouragement Prize	Naku, Nakuu, Nakuuu!	Nanoy Rafael	Sergio Bumatay III	YES
Samsung KidsTime Author's Award	2015	Grand Prize	Haluhalo Espesyal	Yvette Fernandez	Jill Arwen Posadas	YES
Samsung KidsTime Author's Award	2015	Grand Prize	Ano'ng Gupit Natin Ngayon?	Russell Molina	Hubert Fucio	YES
Samsung KidsTime Author's Award	2015	2nd prize	Diego and Marie	Robert Magnuson	Robert Magnuson	YES
Samsung KidsTime Author's Award	2015	2nd prize	Sandosenang Kuya	Russell Molina	Hubert Fucio	YES

== Services ==
Adarna House's main office is located in Quezon City. It has just one other branch in La Trinidad, Benguet. To make up for limited visibility, it holds book fairs in schools and participates in trade fairs throughout the year.

The publishing house is also known for its storytelling sessions, called Kuwentong Adarna. Facilitated by a member of Adarna House's pool of storytellers, the sessions are done to encourage children to take up the habit of reading.

Apart from storytelling, Adarna House also facilitates numerous workshops for children and adults. Regularly held during summer vacation, Klasrum Adarna for kids offer a variety of writing and illustration classes, while Klasrum offerings for adults include storytelling, teaching beginning reading, and library improvement among others.

Adarna House also offers book development services to individuals and institutions out to commission the production of a book project. The services include copy writing, editing, research, illustration, art direction, and printing.

== Partners ==
Adarna House works with various organizations to carry out its primary goal "to educate and entertain the Filipino child."

In partnership with DepEd and Ronald McDonald House Charities (RMHC)'s Bright Minds Read!, big books and a collection of lesson plans were developed to help public school teachers use children's literature as a springboard in building reading skills among beginning readers.

The Department of Education (DepEd) and Department of Social Welfare (DSWD) and Development are major partners for the Early Childhood Development Project. DSWD also worked with Adarna House for Ang Buhay ni Bimboy, a guide for parents and day care workers in nurturing children.

As one of the main proponents of Teens Read, Too! (a year-long reading campaign for Filipino teenagers), the Filipinas Heritage Library has hosted many of the campaign's activities under its roof. It is through this partnership that the Pilar Perez novellas for young adults were created.

The Meralco Management and Leadership Development Center (MMLDC) Foundation works closely with Adarna House for Lakbay Kalikasan, which promotes environmental awareness through storytelling, puppet shows, and nature trips.

Adarna House serves the Philippine Board on Books for Young People as its Secretariat. With the logistical assistance of Adarna House, PBBY is able to organize its activities such as the National Children's Book Day celebration, PBBY-Salanga Prize, PBBY-Alcala Prize, and the Salaysayan National Storytelling Competition.

The Reading Association of the Philippines came on board Adarna House's Libro Mo, Libro Ko program to help identify beneficiaries for the program. For every pledge of donation to these beneficiaries, RAP offers free teacher training and Adarna House comes in with additional book donations.

In 2008, Adarna House and Reach Out and Read-Philippines launched the first bilingual board books in the country during the opening of Aklatang Adarna, a reading corner at the Philippine Children's Medical Center.

Two five-storybook series, Batang Historyador and Batang Katutubo, were completed with United Nations International Children's Fund (UNICEF).

== See also ==
- Literacy in the Philippines
- Philippine Literature
