= Leona Florentino =

Filipina writer

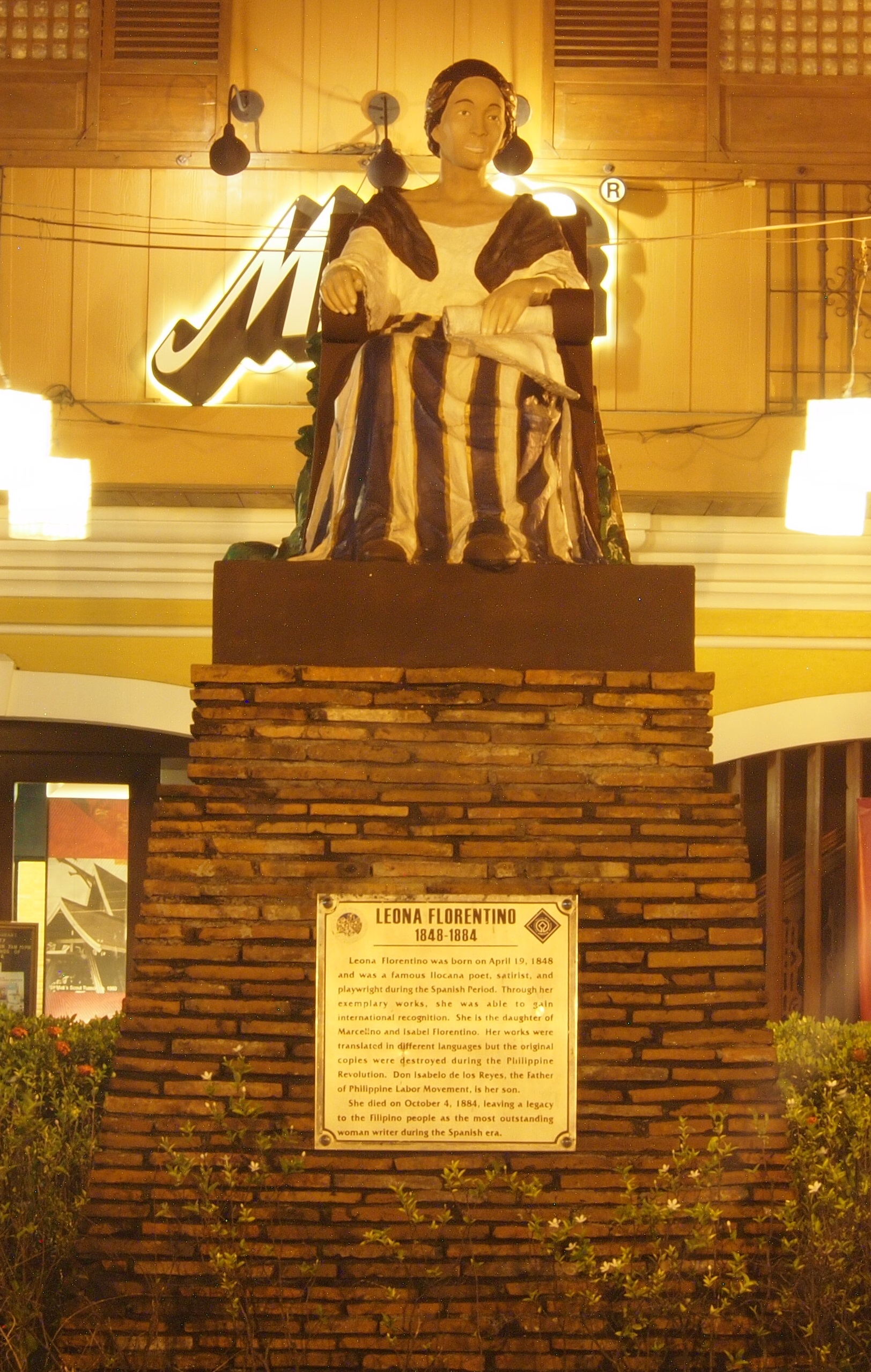
- Statue of Leona Florentino on Calle Crisologo, Vigan City viewed at night.
- Born: 19 April 1849; Vigan, Ilocos Sur, Captaincy General of the Philippines
- Died: 4 October 1884 (aged 35); Vigan, Ilocos Sur, Captaincy General of the Philippines
- Occupations: Novelist, Political writer, Poet, and Journalist
- Spouse(s): Elias de los Reyes (1863–1883, his death; estranged)
- Children: 5, including Isabelo de los Reyes
- Writing career
- Language: Spanish; Ilocano

Leona Josefa Florentino (19 April 1849 – 4 October 1884) was a Filipina foundational poet, dramatist, satirist, and playwright who wrote and poetically spoke in Ilocano, her mother tongue, and Spanish, the lingua franca of her era. She is considered as the "mother of Philippine women's literature", serving as the "bridge from oral to literary tradition"; and as a pioneer in Philippine lesbian literature.

== Life ==
A view of the Leona Florentino Plaza with her statue at the center. To the right is her ancestral house, a declared National Cultural Treasure and currently operating as a restaurant named Cafe Leona

Born to the Florentino clan, a wealthy and prominent family in Vigan, Ilocos Sur, Florentino was baptized under the Christian name Leona Josefa Florentina. Her father was Marcelino Pichay Florentino, Vigan's wealthiest man at the time, while her mother was Isabel Florentina, who first educated her as a child. A historical marker installed in 1958 by the Philippine Historical Committee, a predecessor of the National Historical Commission of the Philippines, states that she was a distant cousin of José Rizal. She began to write her first verses in Ilocano at a very young age. Despite her potential, she was not allowed to receive a university education because of her gender and the patriarchal norms of the era. Because of this, her mother Isabel, who was also disallowed to have a university education when she was young, made it her personal mission to tutor Leona and teach her everything she knew to expand her daughter's natural talent. A series of private teachers were also persuaded and brought by her mother to teach Leona, and later, included an educated Ilocano Catholic priest, Evaristo Abaya, the curate of Vigan. Evaristo, impressed by a 10-year old Leona's high level of talent in poetry despite having no formal education, agreed to teach her advanced Spanish writing and speech and encouraged her to develop her voice in poetry even though it was against the era's norms.

Her home education, however, was cut short after her father, Marcelino, forced her at the age of 14 to marry the politician Elias Llanes de los Reyes, who was the alcalde mayor of Vigan at the time and way beyond her age. Leona and Elias were cousins, and marriage between relatives was practiced by some in the 1800's for a variety of reasons. With their marriage, the ownership of some land properties of her father's clan were secured and remained within the family. As a young teenager, she bore and raised five children. Despite the constraints imposed on her by the era's norms against women liberation, she did not stop writing. Her creative talent expanded exponentially through the years, while her perspectives on equality progressed, leading to her feminist writings which would later on would be her most impactful works. Some of her works narrated her lived experience of loving a woman during the patriarchal colonial era, becoming one of the most important historical lesbian writing in Philippine literature. After her husband Elias found out about her protofeminist writings, their marriage quickly soured. Due to the protofeminist nature of her writings and her progressive ideals for women and minorities, in around 1869 to 1870, Florentino was shunned by her pro-patriarchy husband, as well as her children who were convinced by their father. Elias personally stated that he shunned Leona due to her tuberculosis, but most believed that the reason was Leona's feminist ideals and influence on her children, which Elias was fully against. Elias vocally did not support Leona's creative inclination towards the literary feminist arts. At the age of around 20, Leona lived alone in exile and was separated from her five children, who were disallowed to see their mother. She moved to a small neighborhood outside the city. While continuing her writings and spoken word engagements, she became adept in horseback riding and smoking cigars. Her ideals and the path she took was never accepted by her wealthy father, who remained as head of the clan. Prominent politician and playwright Marcelino Crisólogo was her brother-in-law.

Her husband Elias died more than a decade later in 1883. Her eldest son Isabelo de los Reyes, who was 6 years old when his mother was removed from his life, later on reconnected ties with her after the death of Elias, which allowed him to finally visit his mother after some 14 years when he was around 20 years old. Both mother and son grew a very close relationship, where Leona greatly influenced Isabelo's social perspectives, later on leading to Isabelo's successful literary career and democratic-progressive ideals and support for Philippine revolution and women's rights as an adult. Isabelo also became a progressive activist and would be elected as senator after the revolution. Leona continued her literary works until she died on October 4, 1884 due to tuberculosis at the age of 35. She was buried in Vigan Cathedral. After her death, her son Isabelo made it his mission to exponentially introduce her mother's literary prowess to the world by way of international promulgation, publications, and exchanges with his peers, leading to the expansion of people who became familiar with Leona's progressive feminist poetic creations, which were published and preserved in France, Spain, and the United States. In 1902, Isabelo, along with his friend and fellow anti-friar Gregorio Aglipay, established the Philippine Independent Church (IFI in the locale), officially seceding from the Roman Catholic Church which was controlled by ultra-conservative priests who wanted to maintain the patriarchy at the time. Many revolutionaries and intellectuals became members of the IFI and were influenced by the new institution's progressive teachings, leading to liberal reforms in Philippine society in the 1900's, including women's right to education, which was one of the many things that Leona was disallowed to have in her youth. After becoming senator in 1922, Isabelo controversially campaigned for women's right to suffrage, one of the feminist causes of his mother Leona. Despite retiring from politics in 1931 due to sickness, he continued his campaign as a civilian until women's right to vote was finally legalized in 1937. Isabelo died in 1938 and was buried in Manila. In 1946, after World War II, Leona's grandchild and Isabelo's son, Isabelo Valentin de los Reyes, Jr. y López, became the Obispo Máximo, the equivalent of Pope, in the progressive Philippine Independent Church.

Beginning in the 1990's, more than a century after Leona's death, the Philippine government through the Cultural Center of the Philippines, initiated performances honoring Leona's works and contributions to the arts and the democratic ideals of the country. Monologues, with many translated from the original Ilocano or Spanish, alluded to her life, including her love for a woman during the patriarchal Spanish colonial era, where lesbian or queer love was persecuted. A sculpture was also made, and now stands at the plaza fronting her family's ancestral house in the UNESCO World Heritage Site of Calle Crisologo, Vigan. Her house, which has been declared as a National Cultural Treasure of the Philippines, has been preserved and converted into the offices of the Provincial Tourism Center, the Vigan Heritage Commission, and the gastronomical center of Casa Leona. Leona's clan continues to live in Vigan while some reside in Metro Manila for commerce.

== Works ==
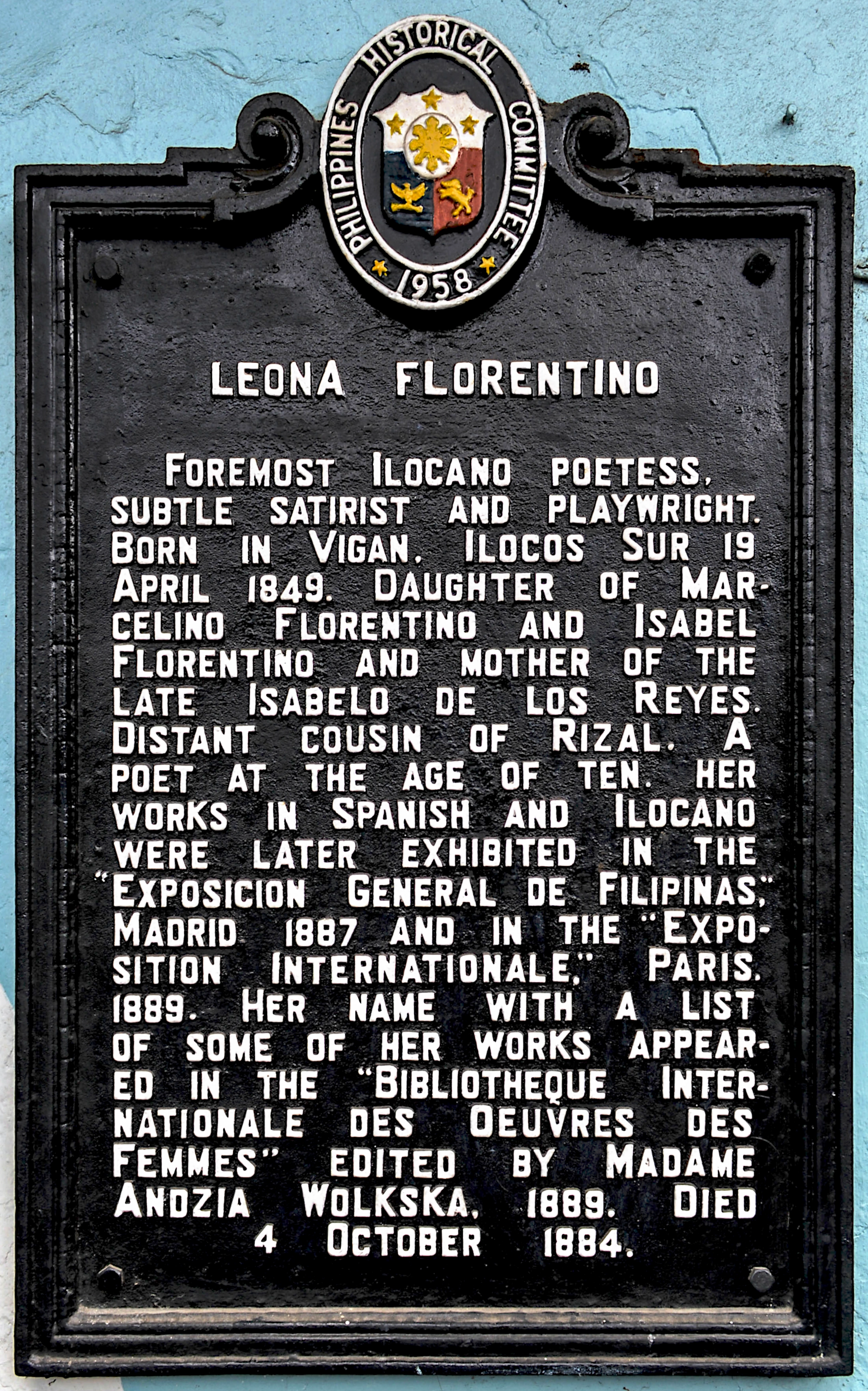
Historical marker of Leona Florentino, installed by the Philippine Historical Committee in 1958. UNESCO installed another marker below her statue.

Her lyrical poetry in Spanish, and especially that in Ilocano, gained attention in various international forums in Spain, Paris and St. Louis, Missouri. Of her many writings, unfortunately, only 22 poems have been preserved, where many were likely destroyed by those against her progressive writings during the patriarchal Spanish colonial era, while some were destroyed as a result of war against the Spanish colonizers. The remaining 22 literary contributions were posthumously presented at the Exposicion General de Filipinas in Madrid in 1887 three years after her death. They are again presented at the International Exposicion in Paris in 1889 and at the St. Louis International Exposition in Missouri in 1904. They were also included in the Encyclopedia Internationale des Oeuvres des Femmes (International Encyclopedia of Women's Works) in 1889. Although more known for her poems, Leona also wrote manifestos on Filipina strength and critiques on colonial rule through satirical writings in a gentle progression. For much of the 20th century, Leona's sexuality and romantic relationships with some of her female peers were intentionally neglected by scholars of literature, to an extent that they have been omitted in chronicles, likely an attempt to whitewash her sexual orientation. This whitewashing was halted after her life as a lesbian woman was finally vividly performed in the Cultural Center of the Philippines in the 1990's.

In 2020, the prestigious Philippine Graphic, recognizing Leona as the “Mother of Feminist Literature” in the Philippines, honored her as "the “bridge” from oral tradition to written poetry" because of her skillful way of delivering her verses, while noting her works as “excellently lyrical”. She was known to be peak caliber not just in the creative writing arts, but also in spoken word poetry, where she would vocally deliver her poems during occasions such as celebrations, anniversaries, and other events. It was also common knowledge among her peers that she would always promise to write a poem to her friends or relatives, leading to everyone to await the moment when she would express her verses either publicly for everyone to hear or secretly for close friends and progressive allies. Before her poems were published internationally by her son Isabelo, people from Vigan society and the region were known to speak her poems even after her death, influencing the society of her homeland by way of oral and literary tradition. Her life and creative works have made a huge impact in both Ilocano literature and Philippine literature.

Some of the preserved works of Leona Florentino which mirror some aspects of her life are Felicitación satírica, which tells of a spinster in her 28th birthday who was tragically only pursued by older men, Coronación de una soltera en sus días, which celebrates the birthday of a maiden, Declaración simbólica, which is poetic narrative of one's private erotic reflections disallowed among women but allowed for men during the colonial era, and Nalpay A Namnama, which depicts Leona's doomed love for a woman she cannot be with due to the patriarchal constraints of her era. Other poems include Kakaibang Pagkalibing ng Paghahangad, Naunsyaming pag-asa, and Pagbating babiro.

== Legacy ==
A street at the Cultural Center of the Philippines Complex in Pasay City is named in her memory.
