= Yvette Fernandez =

Filipino children's writer

Yvette Fernandez is a children's book author based in Manila, Philippines.

== Literary career ==
Fernandez is the chief of editorial content at Robb Report Philippines. Previously, she was Chief Storyteller of the Gokongwei Group, the editorial director of Esquire Philippines and editor in chief of the now out-of-print Town&Country Philippines. She was a broadcast journalist with Bloomberg News in New York. She holds a master's degree in Journalism from the Columbia University Graduate School of Journalism in New York.

== Published works ==
Fernandez's first book, Haluhalo Espesyal, was illustrated by Jill Arwen Posadas and published by Adarna House in 2006. In 2012, then-Philippine President Benigno Aquino III read the book to fourth graders at the Teodora Alonzo Elementary School as part of A Day of Reading, in observance of National Reading Month.

Aquino said he could relate to the main character, Jackie, because he was loved by his late parents and grandparents. "All of us need to be loved. We will achieve much if all of us will love and support each other," he said, according to a report in the Philippine Daily Inquirer.

Three years later, Haluhalo Espesyal was one of the grand prize winners in the inaugural Samsung KidsTime Authors' Award (SKTAA), the first print-to-digital book awards in Southeast Asia. The results were announced during an awards ceremony at the Asian Festival of Children’s Content (AFCC) organized by the National Book Development Council of Singapore (NBDCS).

During the COVID-19 pandemic in 2021, Haluhalo Espesyal was used to train storytellers at 52 so-called "Book Nooks" in remote areas across the Philippines so indigenous people could have access to books.

The Embassy of the Philippines in Canada gave away copies of the book to Canadian children of Filipino descent through its ABAKADA Atbp. book program in 2021 when the embassy was unable to conduct its regular summer programs due to the pandemic.

In 2012, Fernandez wrote Big John, illustrated by Abi Goy, the first book in the imprint Dream Big Books by Summit Books, a division of Summit Media. It tells the rags-to-riches life story of billionaire John Gokongwei Jr.

Maia's Birthday Party, the story of an adopted child who celebrates her birthday at the orphanage where her friends still live, was illustrated by Nicole Lim and published by Adarna House in 2012.

Socorro Ramos, the founder of National Book Store, the Philippines' largest book store chain, was the subject of Fernandez's second Dream Big Book, Nanay Coring, illustrated by Liza Flores. Ramos, an Ernst & Young Entrepreneur of the Year awardee, was so poor as a child, she had to take on odd jobs to buy supplies for school.

The book was soon followed by Ninoy, Cory, and Noynoy, illustrated by Abi Goy, and part of the Dream Big Books series by Summit Books. It told the story of the late former Philippine senator Benigno Aquino Jr. his widow, Corazon Aquino, later the first female Philippine President, and their five children, including their only son, the late President Benigno Aquino III.

Simply Jesse, the fourth title in Summit Books’ Dream Big Books series, is the story of Jesse Robredo, the late Secretary of Local Government of President Benigno Aquino III. It's the story of Robredo's life as a family man and public servant till he died in a plane crash. His widow, Leni Robredo, later became Vice President of the Philippines.

Princess Lea, the story of Tony Award-winning actor Lea Salonga, written by Fernandez and illustrated by Nicole Lim was launched in 2013, as another Dream Big book. It tells Salonga's story starting from when she auditioned for a role in "The King and I" at six years old. It won the Filipino Readers Choice Award for Children's Picture Books in 2014.

Fernandez's next Dream Big book released in 2015 was What's Ap? The Story of apl.de.ap the story of Filipino-American member of the group, the Black Eyed Peas. Illustrated by Ray Sunga, the book started singer’s humble beginnings in Angeles, Pampanga.

In June 2018, Fernandez and illustrator Isabel Roxas discussed their children's book Life Is Good: A Tale of Two Elephants published by Anvil Publishing at the AsiaStore of the Asia Society in New York.

In August 2018, Fernandez launched the same book at the Writers' Bar of the Raffles Hotel Makati.

== Reviews ==
The Manila Bulletin described the book as "the story two elephant sisters, one a stuffed toy and the other a glass display, both belonging to a little boy. Naturally, because of how different these two elephants are, the little boy doesn’t play with them in the same way. The stuffed toy elephant gets to go places, while the glass elephant just stays in place, on a table inside the little boy’s playroom. Though different, both are still elephants, and that’s why they consider themselves sisters."

In 2019, Anvil Publishing released Good Morning, Manila! and Good Night, Manila!, a pair of books illustrated by Nicole Lim that take readers around the City of Manila.

"I'd like to think that these books will resonate with Filipinos all over the world who have happy memories about Manila. I want these books to be a source of nostalgia and pride for them," Fernandez told spot.ph.

Yorme! The Life Story of Isko Moreno, written by Fernandez and illustrated by Ray Sunga, was published by Summit Books in 2021. It tells the story of how a garbage scavenger from Tondo went against all odds to become the Mayor of the City of Manila.

In 2021, Adarna House released Dancing Waters: The Story of Leni Robredo, a book on then-Vice President of the Philippines Leni Robredo, written by Fernandez and illustrated by Abi Goy. Half of the sales went to the Office of the Vice President's community learning hubs, launched during the COVID-19 pandemic to support students and shifts during the shift to distance learning.

The Christmas Toys, written by Fernandez, and illustrated by Aldy Aguirre, was published in 2022, 33 years after the story was written.

"Sometimes in the busyness of life, people forget what the first Christmas was [all about] and hopefully people remember that," Fernandez told Businessworld.

It was displayed at the Philippines booth at Frankfurter Buchmesse in 2023 and the London Book Fair in 2024.
