= Leon C. Pichay =

20th century Filipino writer and poet

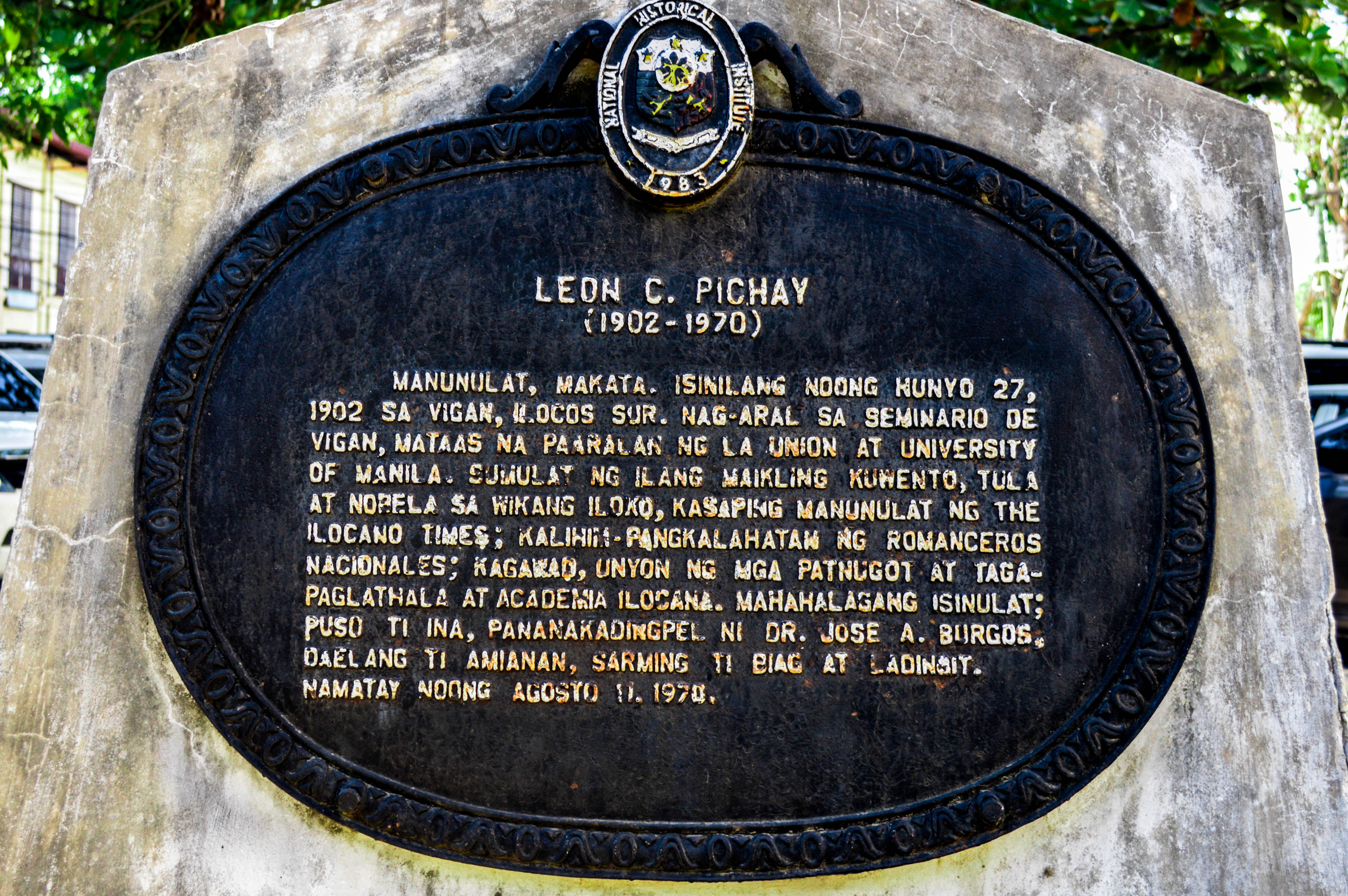
Leon Pichay historical marker, Vigan City

Leon Pichay (June 27, 1902 – August 11, 1970) was a writer and poet from the Philippines. Pichay was one of the most active Ilocano writers of his time. He wrote short stories, plays, novels, essays and more than 400 poems. He was known as the 'King of Ilocano Poets' during the 1950s.

He was born on June 27, 1902, in Vigan, Ilocos Sur. He studied law at the University of Manila. During his studies he wrote many poems and worked for various Ilocano newspapers, including being an associate writer for the Ilocano Times. Other publications for which he wrote include Panagbiag, Timekmi, Ti Agipaawat, Wagayway, Heraldo Ilocano, El Norte, and Naimbag a Damag. He also became members of societies such as the Filipino Editors and Publishers Union (as editor) and of Romanceros Nacionales (as secretary-general). Eventually he was not able to complete his studies.

Pichay was a versatile and active writer, and he wrote short stories, plays, novels, essays and hundreds of poems. Although he was educated in English, he chose to write in his native language Ilocano, and thus contributed to the development of Ilocano literature. He was also one of the initiators of bukanegan, the Ilocano counterpart of balagtasan, and was granted the title Prince of Bukanegan. He was very popular with the people. For example, many sound recordings of his poems were sold just before the Second World War, and he gave recitals of poems during the celebration of the winners of the election as the highlight of the annual fiesta.

His poems had themes such as patriotism, spirituality, and love. He also wrote about Filipino heroes like José Rizal and Antonio Luna. Some examples of his work are: Kailukoan (Ilocos), about his people the Ilocanos; Ni Kaingungotko (My Beloved); Nena A Naig Kararuak (Nena, Joy of My Soul), which he wrote for his wife Filomena Oasan; Ayatenka Uray Ulpitannak (I Love You Despite Your Cruelty); Pinaan Ni Ulila (Have Pity on the Poor Orphan), O Apo Jesucristo Nga Ari (O, Christ, the Lord), a religious poem; and Ti Dilak (My Mother Tongue), a patriotic poem written for his love for the Ilocano language and his conviction that as a writer one ought to use one's mother tongue.

He died on August 11, 1970. An award was named after him by the Gunglo Dagiti Mannurat nga Ilokano (GUMIL) as a memorial to his contribution to Ilocano literature. A historical marker was granted to him by the National Historical Institute (now National Historical Commission of the Philippines) in 1983 in his hometown of Vigan.

| Original Filipino Text | Translated English Text |
|---|---|
| MANUNULAT, MAKATA, ISINILANG NOONG HUNYO 27, 1902 SA VIGAN, ILOCOS SUR. NAG-ARAL SA SEMINARIO DE VIGAN, MATAAS NA PAARALAN NG lA UNION AT UNIVERSITY OF MANILA. SUMULAT NG ILANG MAIKLING KUWENTO, TULA AT NOBELA SA WIKANG ILOKO, KASAPING MANUNULAT NG THE ILOCANO TIMES; KALIHIM PANGKALAHATAN NG ROMANCEROS NACIONALES; KAGAWAD, UNYON NG MGA PATNUGOT AT TAGAPAGLATHALA AT ACADEMIA ILOCANA. MAHAHALAGANG ISINULAT; PUSO TI INA, PANANAKADINGPEL NI DR. JOSE A. BURGOS; DAELANG TI AMIANAN, SARMING TI BIAG AT LADINGIT. NAMATAY NOONG AGOSTO 11, 1970. | Writer, poet. Born on June 27, 1902 in Vigan, Ilocos Sur. Studied at the Vigan Seminary, La Union High School, and University of Manila. Wrote a handful of short stories, poems, and novels in the Ilocano language, associate writer of the Ilocano Times; general-secretary of the Romanceros Nacionales; Editor, Filipino Editors and Publishers Union, and Academia Ilocana. Important writings; Puso ti Ina, Panakakadingpel ni Dr. Jose A. Burgos, Daelang ti Amianan, Sarming ti biag, and Ladingit. Died on August 11, 1970. |
