= Ramon Muzones =

Filipino National Artist for Literature

- Born: March 20, 1913; Iloilo, Philippines
- Died: August 17, 1992 (aged 79); Philippines
- Awards: Order of National Artists of the Philippines

Ramon Muzones (March 20, 1913 – August 17, 1992) was a writer and lawyer and the posthumous recipient of the National Artist of the Philippines for Literature award in the Philippines in 2018. He wrote in Hiligaynon and popularized Hiligaynon literature.

A Karay·a, Muzones was born in Iloilo City and was the oldest of ten children of Santiago Muzones and Florentina Larupay. He received his law degree at Central Philippine University in 1952. He wrote 62 novels in the course of his life, the first of which was Tibud nga Bulawan in 1938. He was a founder of an organization for Hiligaynon writers called Sumakwelan.

== Writing ==
- Margosatubig: The Story of Salagunting (1946)
- Si Tamblot (1948)
- Ang Gugma sang Gugma Bayaran (Love with Love Be Paid, 1955)
- Babae Batuk sa Kalibutan (Woman Against the World, 1959)
- Shri-Bishaya (1969)
- Malala nga Gutom (Malignant Hunger, 1965)

== Awards ==
Muzones' awards included the Gawad Bonifacio sa Panitikan Centennial Award given by the National Commission for Culture and the Arts (1997). In 2018 he was honored as an Ilonggo National Artist of the Philippines for Literature.
