= R. Zulueta da Costa =

Filipino writer (1915–1990)

Rafael Zulueta da Costa (born 1915-1990) was a Filipino poet. He used the name R. Zulueta da Costa as a writer, and Rafael Zulueta as a businessman.

He was a graduate of De La Salle College (now University) where he specialized in business administration. He began writing poems in Spanish and later wrote in English. His most famous work is Like the Molave and Other Poems, which won the Commonwealth Literary Award for Poetry in 1940.
