= Amador Daguio =

Filipino writer and poet

Amador T Daguio
- Born: January 8, 1912; Laoag, Ilocos Norte, Philippine Islands
- Died: April 26, 1966 (aged 54); Philippine General Hospital, Manila
- Resting place: Manila Memorial Park, Paranaque
- Education: Bachelor of Arts in Philosophy, Master of Arts in English, Bachelor of Laws
- Alma mater: University of the Philippines; Stanford University; Romualdez Law College
- Occupations: Writer; Poet; Educator; Lawyer
- Spouse: Estela Fermin Daguio
- Children: Daniel F Daguio, Jenny Daguio Balea, Francis Rey Daguio, Malinda Daguio Felix
- Relatives: Father-Sixto Daguio Mother-Magdalena Taguinod Daguio
- Writing career
- Language: English
- Notable works: Wedding Dance, The Flaming Lyre, Man of Earth, Hudhud Hi Aliguyon
- Notable awards: Republic Cultural Heritage Award

Amador T. Daguio (1912–1966) was a Filipino writer and poet during pre-World War II Philippines. He published two books in his lifetime, and three more posthumously. He was a Republic Cultural Heritage awardee for his works.

== Early life and education ==
Amador Daguio was born on January 8, 1912, in Laoag, Ilocos Norte. His family moved to Lubuagan, Mountain Province, where his father was an officer in the Philippine Constabulary. This early exposure to the rural and indigenous culture of the Cordillera deeply influenced his literary works. Despite the challenges of poverty, Daguio excelled academically and pursued his education with determination.

He graduated with honors in 1924 at the Lubuagan Elementary School as valedictorian. Daguio was already writing poems in elementary school, according to his own account. He wrote a farewell verse on a chalkboard at least once for a departing teacher when he was in grade 6. For his high school studies, he moved to Pasig to attend Rizal High School while residing with his uncle at Fort William McKinley.

Daguio was too poor to afford his college tuition and did not enroll in the first semester of 1928. He also failed to qualify for a scholarship. He worked as a houseboy, waiter, and caddy at Fort McKinley to earn his tuition and later enrolled at the University of the Philippines on the second semester. He experienced financial difficulties in his studies until an uncle from Honolulu, Hawaii funded his tuition on his third year of study. Before his uncle's arrival, Daguio has worked as a printer's devil in his college as well as a writer for the Philippine Collegian.

He was mentored in writing by Tom Inglis Moore, an Australian professor. In 1932, he graduated from UP as one of the top ten honor graduates. After World War II, he went to Stanford University to study his master's in English which he obtained at 1952. And in 1954 he obtained his law degree from Romualdez Law College in Leyte.

== Career ==
When Daguio was a third-year high school student, his poem "She Came to Me" got published in the July 11, 1926, edition of The Sunday Tribune.

After he graduated from UP, he returned to Lubuagan to teach at his former alma mater. He then taught at Zamboanga Normal School in 1938, where he met his wife Estela. During the Second World War, he was part of the resistance and wrote poems. These poems were later published as his book Bataan Harvest.

He was the chief editor for the Philippine House of Representatives, as well as several other government offices. He also taught at the University of the East, University of the Philippines, and Philippine Women's University for 26 years. He died in 1966 from liver cancer at the age of 54.

== Published works ==
- Huhud hi aliguyon (a translation of an Ifugao harvest song, Stanford, 1952)
- The Flaming Lyre (a collection of poems, Craftsman House, 1959)
- The Thrilling Poetical Jousts of Balagtasan (1960)
- Bataan Harvest (war poems, A.S Florentino, 1973)
- The Woman Who Looked Out the Window (a collection of short stories, A.S Florentino, 1973)
- The Fall of Bataan and Corregidor (1975)
- The Wedding Dance (1953)

== Awards ==
- Republic Cultural Heritage award (1973)
