= Philippine crime fiction =

Philippine literature

Philippine crime fiction is a genre of literature in the Philippines that explores themes of crime, justice, and social issues. Rooted in the country’s history and influenced by its legal system, the genre has evolved from early detective and mystery stories into a diverse body of work that includes noir, psychological thrillers, and police procedurals.

== Overview ==
The genre gained prominence in the 20th century, with crime fiction appearing in newspapers, magazines, and later, full-length novels. Notable Filipino writers, such as F.H. Batacan, whose novel Smaller and Smaller Circles (1999) is regarded as the country’s first modern crime novel, have contributed to its development. Philippine crime fiction often reflects the country’s political climate, social inequalities, and real-life criminal cases.

In recent years, the genre has expanded through adaptations in film, television, and graphic novels, as well as through anthologies and contemporary works that continue to explore crime and justice within the Philippine context.
