= Jose Jason Chancoco =

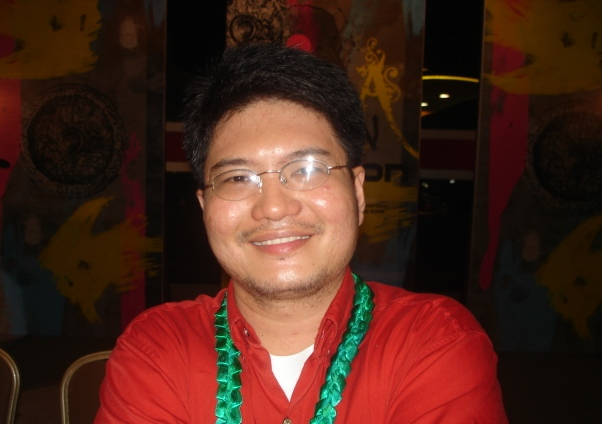
Jose Jason Llagas Chancoco

Jose Jason Llagas Chancoco is a multi-awarded contemporary Bicolano writer in Bikol, Iriganon, Filipino, and English languages.

His first book is Pagsasatubuanan: Poetikang Bikolnon launched in 2009.
