= Agustin Fabian =

Filipino writer and novelist (1901–1976)

Agustín Fabián
- Born: Agustín Fabián y Caralde; August 15, 1901; Quingua, Bulacan, Philippine Islands
- Died: April 24, 1976 (aged 74)
- Occupation: Novelist
- Spouse(s): Ángela Fernández; Rosario Ladia Jose
- Children: With Fernández: 6 With Jose: 2
- Relatives: Epifanio Fabián y Sayo (father); Macaria Caralde y Roxas (mother)
- Writing career
- Pen name: Ángel Fernández; A.C. Fabian; M.S. Martín; Felicísimo Cortéz; Augusto E. Fuentes; F. Bani; Pilar Buendía

Agustin Caralde Fabian (born Agustín Fabián y Caralde, who wrote under a number of pen names including A.C. Fabian, August 15, 1901 - April 24, 1976) was a well-known Filipino writer.

== Early life ==
Fabian was born Agustín Fabián y Caralde on August 15, 1901, in Quingua, Bulacan, to Epifanio Fabián y Sayo (January 13, 1866, Quingua - ?) and Macaria Caralde y Roxas. He graduated with a BS in Industrial Management from the University of Illinois. During World War II, Fabian served as a colonel of guerrillas in the Bulacan area, where he fought against the Japanese.

== Career ==
Fabian worked as chemistry Editor of Graphic, where he is credited with giving the newspaper a "leisurely but sophisticated tone," and for Liwayway. He wrote fiction and essays in both English and Tagalog and was also regarded as a noted pre-war Filipino journalist.

Among his published works were: Sino Ako? (Who Am I), Basta Mayaman (Wealth is Enough), Hindi Man Hanapin (No Need to Search), Magbayad Ka! (Pay Up), and Ana Malaya (1964).

His most famous novel is Timawa (Free Person/Slave), which was praised for "radical break from the usual complicated plots and labyrinthine structures of many novels" published in the Philippines at the time. The novel, written in Tagalog, follows the life of a Filipino student named Andres who takes a number of jobs in the United States, including as a dishwasher. Timawa was first published in 1953 and was republished in 2000 and 2003 by Ateneo de Manila University Press.

Other novels include Maria Mercedes, which was published in 1953.

Fabian is known for encouraging other Filipino authors to write in Tagalog and is recognized as one of the early authors to write in that language. He was also featured in They - Noon: Oral History of 9 Filipino Writers, released in 2001.

== Personal life ==
Fabian first married Ángela Fernández on February 24, 1929, in Quingua, Bulacan, and they had six children: Maria Teresita, Leon, Beatriz, Augusto, Manuel, and Sergio. After Fernández died, Fabian later married Rosario Ladia Jose, and they had two more children: Emma, and Noel.

Fabian died on April 24, 1976.
