= Linda Ty Casper =

Filipino writer (born 1931)

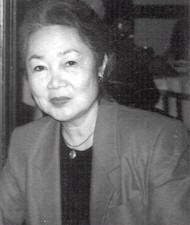
- Born: 1931 (age 94–95); Malabon, Rizal, Philippine Islands
- Occupation: Filipino writer

Linda Ty Casper (born 1931) is a Filipino writer. She is a recipient of the S.E.A. Write Award.

== Life ==
Born as Belinda Ty in Malabon, Philippines in 1931, she spent the World War II years with her grandmother while her father worked in the Philippine National Railways, and her mother in the Bureau of Public Schools. Her grandmother told her innumerable stories about the Filipino's struggle for independence, that later became the topics of her novels. Linda Ty Casper graduated valedictorian in the University of the Philippines, and later earned her Master's degree in Harvard University for International Law. In 1956, she married Leonard Casper, a professor emeritus of Boston College who is also a critic of Philippine Literature. They have two daughters and reside in Massachusetts.

Her works include the historical novel DreamEden and the political novels Awaiting Trespass, Wings of Stone, A Small Party in a Garden, and Fortress in the Plaza. She has also published three collections of short stories which present a cross-section of Filipino society.

In 1992, Tides and Near Occasions of Love won the Philippine PEN short story prize; another at the UNESCO International Writers' Day, London; and the SEAWrite Award in Bangkok "Triptych for a Ruined Altar" was in the Roll of Honor of The Best American Short Stories, 1977.

Her novel Awaiting Trespass which is about the politically sensitive theme of torture by the Marcos regime was published by Readers International of London. This work gained her major critical attention in the United States for the first time, and in Britain the novel was chosen as one of the five best works of fiction by a woman writer published in 1985–86..

== Published works ==
- The Transparent Sun (short stories), Peso Books, 1963
- The Peninsulares (historical novel), Bookmark 1964
- The Secret Runner (short stories), Florentino/National Book, 1974
- The Three-Cornered Sun (historical novel), New Day, 1974
- Dread Empire (novella), Hong Kong, Heinemann, 1980
- The Hazards of Distance (novella), New Day, 1981
- Fortress in the Plaza (novella), New Day, 1985
- Awaiting Trespass (novella), London, Readers International, 1985
- Wings of Stone (novella), London, Readers International, 1986
- Ten Thousand Seeds (historical novel), Ateneo, 1987
- A Small Party in a Garden (novella), New Day, 1988
- Common Continent (short stories), Ateneo, 1991
- Kulasyon: Uninterrupted Vigils (collected first chapters), Giraffe, 1995
- DreamEden (historical novel) Ateneo 1996 and University of Washington Press 1997
- A River, One-Woman Deep: Stories (novella and short stories), PALH (Philippine American Literary House), 2017; University of Santo Tomas Publishing House, 2018
- Will You Happen, Past the Silence, Through the Dark?: Remembering Leonard Ralph Casper (biography), PALH (Philippine American Literary House), 2022
- A Small Party in a Garden: Revised and Critical Edition (novella), PALH (Philippine American Literary House), 2026
- Fortress in the Plaza, Revised Edition (novella), PALH (Philippine American Literary House), 2026

== Awards ==
- Djerassi, 1984
- Filipino-American Women Network Award for Literature, 1985
- Massachusetts Artists Foundation, 1988
- Wheatland, 1990
- UNESCO/P.E.N. Short Story, 1993
- SEA Write Award, Bangkok, 1993
- Bellagio, 1994

== Sources ==
- Grow, L. M. "Ty-Casper (1931-)".The Greenwood Encyclopedia of Asian American Literature. Ed. Guiyou Huang. Westport, Connecticut: Greenwood Press, 2009, 937–940.
- Ty Casper, Linda (2003). Growing Up Filipino. PALH.
- Manlapaz, Edna Zapanta (2003). Filipino Women Writers in English: Their Story 1905-2002. ADMU Press.
