= Teresita Caraveo =

Mexican politician

- Born: 14 November 1961 (age 64); Sonora, Mexico
- Occupation: Politician
- Political party: PRI

Teresita Caraveo Galindo (born 14 November 1961) is a Mexican politician from the Institutional Revolutionary Party. In 2012 she served as Deputy of the LXI Legislature of the Mexican Congress representing Sonora.
