= Teresita Manaloto-Magnaye =

Filipino writer

Teresita Manaloto-Magnaye is a Filipina short story writer. Her short stories saw print in the Liwayway magazine, the oldest magazine in the Philippines.
