= Alfred Yuson =

Filipino author

- Born: Alfred A. Yuson; 1945 (age 80–81)

Alfred A. Yuson, also known as Krip Yuson (born 1945), is a Filipino author of novels, poetry and short stories.

== Career ==
Early in his career, Yuson received a writing fellowship to attend the National Writers Workshop in Dumaguete in 1968. Yuson also has a Filipino Academy of Movie Arts and Sciences Award and a Catholic Mass Media Award (CMMA) Award for Best Screenplay. He has been a documentary filmmaker and scriptwriter, as well as a book, magazine and newspaper editor and designer. In 1988, he collaborated with cinematographer Ernesto Enrique on the documentary A Filipino Pilgrimage to Medjugorje, produced by Troika Video Productions, which was broadcast on ABS-CBN on March 24, 1988. Yuson was also a Fellow at the International Writing Program in Iowa City, U.S. in 1978; the International Poetry Conference at the University of Hawaiʻi in 1979; the Cambridge Seminar, University of Cambridge, in 1989; the International Writers Retreat at Hawthornden Castle in Midlothian, Scotland, in 1990; The Hong Kong International Literary Festival in 2001 and 2006; and the Sydney Writers' Festival in 2006. He has also participated in many other literary conferences, seminars and festivals in Japan, China, Finland, Scotland, Thailand, Malaysia, South Africa, the United Kingdom, Australia and Singapore.

He is a founding member of the Philippine Literary Arts Council, Creative Writing Foundation, Inc. and Manila Critics Circle, and is currently Chairman of the Writers Union of the Philippines. He also serves as Philippines Editor for MANOA: A Pacific Journal of International Writing, published by the University of Hawaiʻi . A documentary filmmaker and scriptwriter, he is a board member of the Movie and Television Ratings and Classification Board in the Philippines.

== Awards and nominations ==
His works have won several literary distinctions, the most recent of which include the Patnubay ng Sining at Kalinangan (Stalwart of Art and Culture) award from the City of Manila in June 2003, and a Rockefeller Foundation grant for residency at the Bellagio Center in Italy in 2003.

Yuson was conferred with the S.E.A. Write Award in 1992 for lifetime achievement, and has been inducted to the Hall of Fame of the Carlos Palanca Memorial Awards for Literature.

Yuson's "The Music Child" was among 5 works shortlisted for the second (2008) Man Asian Literary Prize, which was announced at a Hong Kong ceremony on November 13, 2008.

== Controversies ==
Yuson has been involved in controversies including plagiarism and having his novel cancelled for alleged sexual misconduct.

=== Plagiarism ===
In 2011 Alfred Yuron was accused of plagiarizing several paragraphs from a basketball article. Alfred Yuson acknowledged this act of plagiarism and apologized.

=== Cancellation of his novel ===
In 2026, following an initial announcement that Exploding Galaxies would reissue Alfred Yuson's novel, Great Philippine Jungle Energy Cafe, Exploding Galaxies later announced on September 7, 2026, that it would no longer promote nor release the book. Explodng Galaxies issued an apology to the numerous writers who had protested the novel's reprinting. Led by Katrina Santiago, the protesters cited Yuson's alleged sexual misconduct and history of plagiarism.

Several writers stepped forward and made informal accuations of Yuson's alleged predatory behavior toward women, behavior which some have called an "open secret" in the Philippne literary world.

Many writers were further angered when writer Jose Dalisay, a friend of Yuson, posted in Facebook the question of how many books would be left in his library if he threw away books written "by people who, sometime or other, were accused of moral turpitude, political incorrectness, sexual misconduct, poor parenting, drunkeness, drug use, slovenliness, animal cruelty, greed, arrogance, general insufferability, or some such debility of spirit and behavior. I'll bet half these books would vanish in an instant. And then I would wonder if those left behind were as interesting as the ones now in the garbage."

== Writings ==
His bibliography includes the poetry collections: Sea Serpent, (Monsoon Press, 1980), Trading in Mermaids (Anvil Publishing, Inc., 1993), Mothers Like Elephants ( Anvil Publishing, Inc., 2000), Hairtrigger Loves: 50 Poems on Woman (University of the Philippines Press, 2002), and the translation, Love's A Vice / Bisyo and Pag-Ibig: Translations into English of 60 Poems by Mike L. Bigornia (National Commission for Culture and the Arts, 2004).
