= List of Filipino writers =

This list of Filipino writers is organized by the first letter in the surname.

- Francisco Arcellana
- Francisco Balagtas
- Lualhati Bautista
- Carlos Bulosan
- Cecilia Manguerra Brainard
- Ian Casocot
- Linda Ty Casper
- Gilbert Luis R. Centina III
- Jose Jason Chancoco
- Rin Chupeco
- Gilda Cordero-Fernando
- Adrian Cristobal
- Luis G. Dato
- Edmundo Farolán
- Zoilo Galang
- J. Neil Garcia
- Guillermo Gómez Rivera
- N. V. M. Gonzalez
- Jorge Richard P. Guerrero
- Jessica Hagedorn
- Nick Joaquin
- F. Sionil José
- Teresita Manaloto-Magnaye
- Resil Mojares
- Virginia R. Moreno
- Marcelino Navarra
- Peter Solis Nery
- Arius Raposas
- José Rizal
- Alejandro R. Roces
- Michelle Cruz Skinner
- Miguel Syjuco
- Lysley Tenorio
- Edith L. Tiempo
- Edilberto K. Tiempo
- Rowena Tiempo Torrevillas

== See also ==
- List of Filipino women writers
