= Zoilo Galang =

Filipino author (1895–1959)

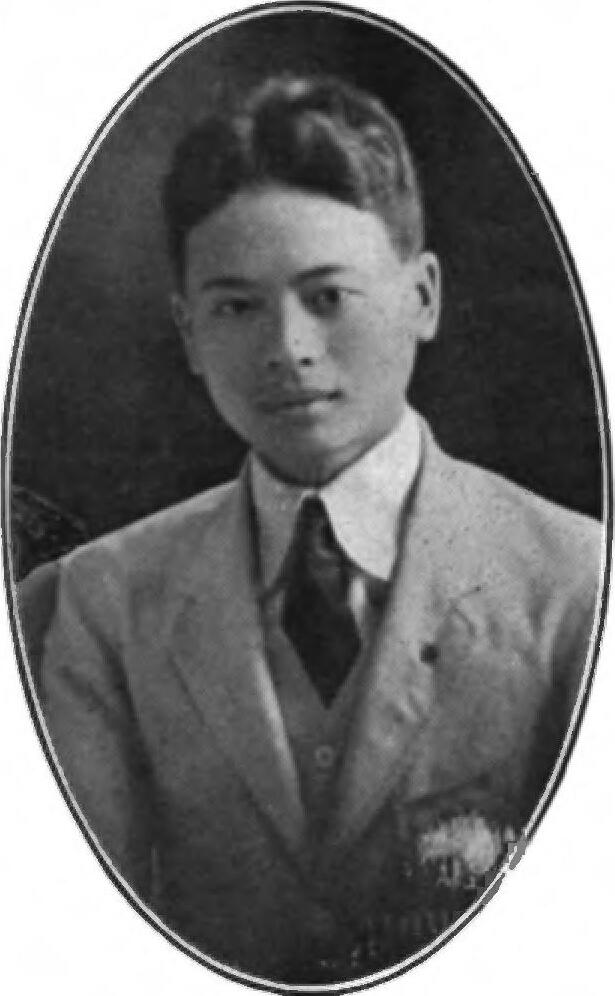
- Galang in 1921
- Born: Zoilo Mercado Galang; July 27, 1895; Bacolor, Pampanga, Captaincy General of the Philippines
- Died: 1959 (aged 63–64); Philippines
- Education: Pampanga High School
- Occupation: Writer
- Spouse: Adela Cortez
- Children: 5
- Writing career
- Language: English
- Notable work: A Child of Sorrow

Zoilo Mercado Galang (July 27, 1895 – 1959) was a Filipino writer from Pampanga. He is credited as one of the pioneering Filipino writers who worked with the English language. He is the author of the first Philippine novel written in the English language, A Child of Sorrow, published in 1921.

== Early life and education ==
Galang was born on July 27, 1895, in the town of Bacolor, Pampanga to Santiago Galang and Vicenta Mercado during the later years of the Spanish colonial era in the Philippines and was influenced by both Spanish and American culture in his youth. He finished studies at the Pampanga High School. He initially worked as a stenographer working in both Spanish and English languages. Galang also pursued studies to pursue a career as a lawyer but there are no records to indicate if he did finish his law studies.

== Career ==
He became known for his publications written in English. He is known for being responsible for the first publication of several Philippine works in English:

- A Child of Sorrow (1921) – first Philippine novel in English
- Tales of the Philippines (1921) – first volume of Philippine legends and folk tales written in English
- Life and Success (1921) – first volume of Philippine essays in English
- The Box of Ashes and Other Stories (1924) – first volume of Philippine short stories in English

His essays were also published in The Best Thing in the World and Master of Destiny (both published in 1924):

He also worked to get 20 volumes of encyclopedia featuring Philippine-related subjects in 1957. The publication of such collection was hindered due to its manuscript being burned during World War II yet they were successfully able to publish the 3rd edition after the fires. Copies of the volumes are found throughout the world in major libraries to this day. He also worked as a writer of history publications for use of elementary students such as Leaders of the Philippines (1932), Important Characters in Philippine History (1939), Mario and Minda (1940), Hero of Tirad Pass and Others (1949), Mr. Perez, Teacher (1950) and Home, School and Community (1950).
