= Filipiniana =

Artifacts related to the history, geography, folklore, and culture of the Philippines

Filipiniana, based on the definition by Isagani Medina from "Collection Building: Filipiniana", in his In Developing Special Library Collections, Filipiniana: Proceedings (November 1992), are Philippine-related books and non-book materials (such as figurines, games, fashion and culture). The materials may be produced inside or outside the Philippines by Filipino or non-Filipino authors. The product could be literature written in any of the languages and dialects in the Philippines or a foreign language.

== Etymology ==
Based on former dean and professor Rosa M. Vallejo of the Institute of Library Science of the University of the Philippines the term Filipiniana was a derivation from two root words: namely Filipinas, the Spanish-language version of the country name of the Philippines and -ana or -aniana, which means “collected items of information” which may be anecdotal or bibliographical in nature.

== Other definitions ==
Filipiniana is also defined as publications dealing with the Philippines in whatever language they may be written and place where they may have been printed. Filipiniana could also be materials published by Filipinos encompassing any subject matter regardless of the imprint of the publication. Filipiniana also include printed materials prior to the American period (1898–1946) in Philippine History regardless of the author and the topic.

The De La Salle University Library defined Filipiniana as all book publications regarding the Philippines and the peoples and culture of the Philippines regardless of author, imprint and language. The definition encompasses, in general, works written by Filipinos, books written in the Philippine languages, publications and yearbooks produced by the government of the Philippines, publications include "substantial portions" and chapters about the Philippines (except publications containing only a small portion or a chapter about the Philippines), and works that deal with the "application of scientific thought and methodology to national and local “needs and circumstances" in the Philippines.

== Significance and purpose ==
As a collection, Filipiniana materials are required for studying the Philippines. The materials are helpful in providing information on the "extent of the intellectual faculties of [persons] born" in the Philippines and the industries, likings, and inclinations of these people, and the like.

== Scope ==
As a collection, there are two views related to Filipiniana, namely: the comprehensive Filipiniana collection and the specific Filipiniana collection. From these views and scope emerged other definitions or criteria for literary and non-literary items in order to be considered as Filipiniana materials. Wenceslao Retana defined Filipiniana in his Aparato Bibliográfico de la Historia General de Filipinas (1906) as any book printed in the Philippines, regardless of the topic, that is "indispensable to the complete study of typhography" of the Philippine Islands. Luis Montilla defined Filipiniana in his A Brief Survey of the Bibliographical Accomplishments of the Past: A Plan for a New Philippine National Bibliography (1940) as writings and printed or published materials employing the languages of the Philippines regardless of the chosen topic by the author and irrespective of the place of publication. The scope extends to any work that has "distinct chapters" and "passages" or sections about the Philippines that can be used for “local historical investigation and research”.

== See also ==
- Compañía General de Tabacos de Filipinas
