= Indarapata at Sulayman =

Epic poem in Mindanao, Philippines

Indarapatra at Sulayman (also known as Indarapatra and Sulayman) is a traditional epic poem of the Mindanao People in the Philippines. Rooted in the pre-Islamic and early Islamic oral traditions of the region, the epic narrates the heroic exploits of the mythical King Indarapatra of Mantapuli and his warrior brother, Prince Sulayman, as they undertake a perilous quest to save the land of Mindanao from four devastating monsters.

The epic is considered a cornerstone of Philippine mythology and folk literature, highlighting cultural values such as brotherhood, selfless sacrifice, and the triumph of civilization and order over chaos.

== Background and Origins ==
Indarapatra at Sulayman was originally transmitted orally as part of the broader collection of Maranao and Maguindanao epic chants, sharing narrative DNA with the UNESCO-recognized Darangen. The epic blends pre-colonial animistic beliefs with later Islamic motifs, reflecting the cultural and spiritual evolution of the Mindanao region.

The narrative was first formally transcribed and translated into English in 1930 by Frank C. Laubach, an American missionary and educator who spent significant time documenting the oral traditions of the Lanao region. Laubach's translation was published in the Philippine Magazine. It was later popularized in Philippine educational literature through a Tagalog metrical romance adaptation by writer Bartolome del Valle.

== Synopsis ==
Long ago, the island of Mindanao was a prosperous land filled with people, until four terrifying monsters mysteriously emerged, bringing death and destruction. They devoured almost all the inhabitants, forcing the few survivors to hide in remote mountain caves.

News of the devastation eventually reached the distant, utopian kingdom of Mantapuli, ruled by the great and wise King Indarapatra. Moved by compassion for the people of Mindanao, Indarapatra asked his courageous brother, Prince Sulayman, to cross the sea and slay the monsters. Indarapatra gave Sulayman his magical sword, Juru Pakal (often described as a magic Kampilan), and a magic ring. Before Sulayman departed, Indarapatra planted a young sapling by his window, telling his brother: "By this tree I shall know your fate. If it lives, you live; but if it dies, you are dead."

Sulayman flew through the air to Mindanao. His first stop was Mount Kabalalan, where he fought and killed Kurita, a terrible creature with multiple limbs. Next, he traveled to Mount Matutum and defeated Tarabusaw, an ugly, man-eating ape-like monster. Sulayman then proceeded to Mount Bita, where he encountered the enormous bird Pah. Though Sulayman managed to strike and kill the bird with his sword, the dead creature's massive severed wing fell on him, crushing him to death.

Back in Mantapuli, King Indarapatra watched in horror as the sapling withered and died. Grief-stricken, he knew his brother had perished. Armed with his own weapons, he immediately flew to Mindanao to search for him. At Mount Bita, he lifted the severed wing of Pah and found Sulayman's bones alongside his sword. Looking around, Indarapatra discovered a magical jar of water sent from heaven. He poured the water over Sulayman's bones, miraculously resurrecting his brother.

Overjoyed, Sulayman returned to Mantapuli, while Indarapatra stayed behind to finish the quest. He traveled to Mount Gurayn, where he fought and killed the final monster, a dreadful seven-headed bird. With the monsters defeated, Indarapatra found the surviving people hiding in a cave, including a beautiful maiden whom he married. Peace and prosperity were finally restored to the land of Mindanao.

== The Four Monsters ==
The epic vividly describes the four creatures that plagued the island, each representing a different aspect of natural or supernatural terror:

- Kurita: A terrifying, amphibious monster with many limbs that lived partly on land and partly in the sea. It haunted Mount Kabalalan.
- Tarabusaw: A giant, ugly creature resembling a man or an ape, known for breaking large branches of trees to use as weapons. It haunted Mount Matutum.
- Pah: An enormous bird whose wingspan was so massive that it covered the sun and brought darkness to the earth when it flew. Its egg was the size of a house. It haunted Mount Bita.
- The Seven-Headed Bird (Balbal): A dreadful bird with seven heads that possessed the power to see in all directions simultaneously. It haunted Mount Gurayn.

== Themes and Symbolism ==
Indarapatra at Sulayman is celebrated for its rich cultural themes and moral lessons:

- Brotherhood and Loyalty: The deep bond between Indarapatra and Sulayman is the emotional core of the epic. Sulayman's willingness to face death and Indarapatra's desperate quest to resurrect him highlight the supreme value of familial loyalty in Mindanao culture.
- The Ideal Leader: King Indarapatra embodies the qualities of a model ruler. He is compassionate, brave, and feels a profound sense of responsibility for the welfare of people even beyond his own borders.
- Good vs. Evil: The monsters serve as allegorical representations of chaos, natural disasters, or foreign threats, while the brothers represent order, civilization, and divine justice.

== See also ==
- Philippine epic poetry
- Darangen
- Biag ni Lam-ang
- Hinilawod
- Philippine mythology
