= Philippine epic poetry =

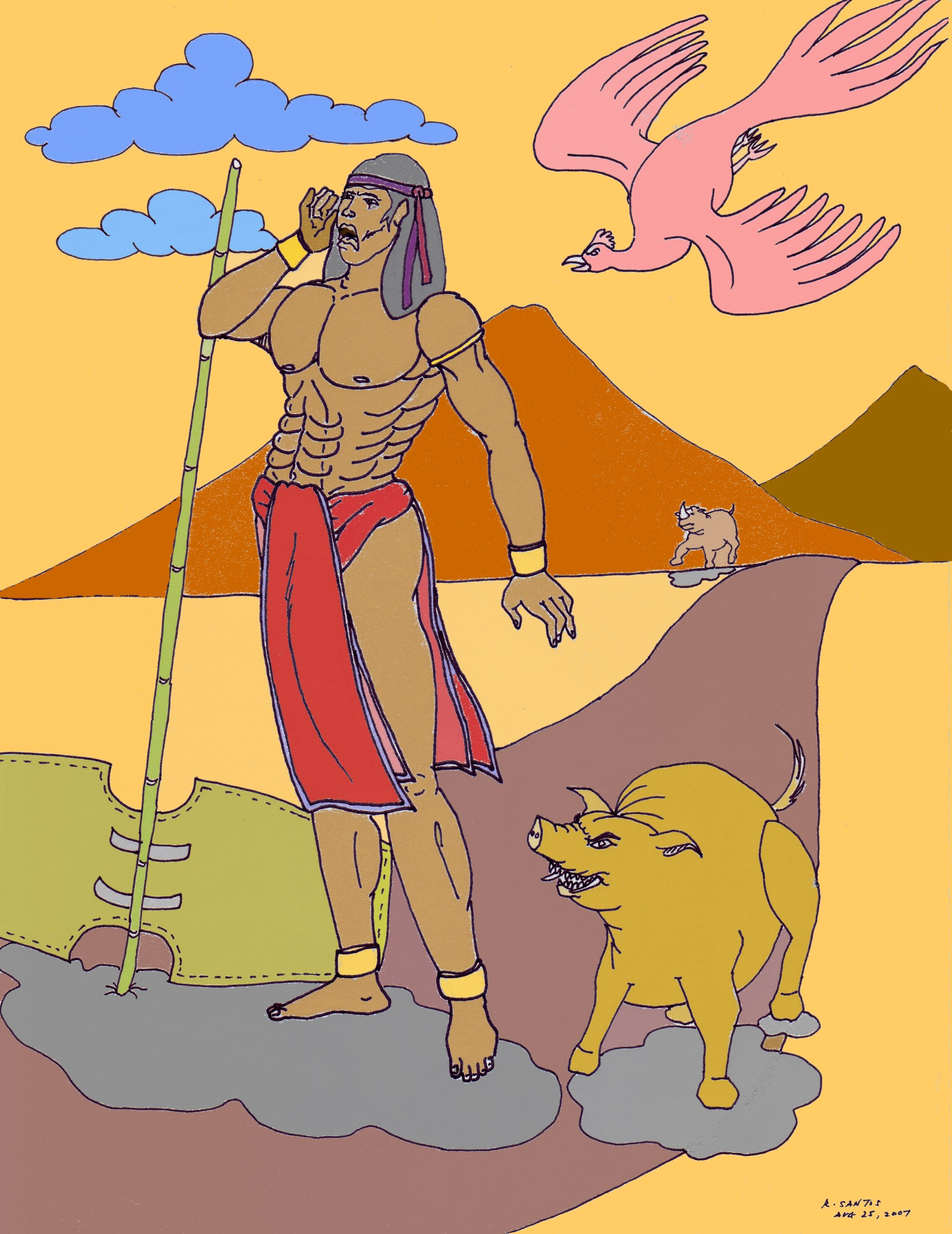
Depiction of Lam-Ang, the protagonist of Biag ni Lam-Ang, an Ilocano epic.

Philippine epic poetry is the body of epic poetry in Philippine literature. Filipino epic poetry is considered to be the highest point of development for Philippine folk literature, encompassing narratives that recount the adventures of tribal heroes. These epics are transmitted through oral tradition using a select group of singers and chanters.

A study revealed that the Philippine folk epics, like those found in Asia, are often about a quest for a wife as well as the various ordeals linked to the founding of a family, hamlet, tribe or a kingdom. The narratives would include voyages - on earth, sea, sky, and the underworld - to allow the hero or heroine to overcome the challenges faced. After their ordeals, the protagonists - through improvement of their personal qualities – would become ideals for their genders.

== Form and motifs ==
E. Arsenio Manuel defines heroic narratives in verse as "folk epics" or "ethnographics" and describes their common characteristics:

1. Narratives of sustained length
2. Based on oral tradition
3. Revolving around supernatural events or heroic deeds
4. In the form of verse
5. Either chanted or sung
6. With a certain seriousness of purpose, embodying or validating the beliefs, customs, ideas, or values of the people

Within folk epic poems, common themes can be observed.

=== Epic singing and singers ===
Epics are generally sung during folk festivals and recreational gatherings such as weddings, baptisms, wakes, prestige rites, peace agreements, and the like. They are sung primarily as entertainment, but can also serve to inspire the youth to emulate their heroes. Among some groups, such as the Ifugao people, certain types of Hudhud songs are prescribed for certain occasions, such as during the death of a prominent person, when ancestral bones are dug out to be blessed, or during harvest, like the Hudhud hi Aliguyon. The Palawan Kudaman is also sung on special occasions – as an offering to the lord of the chase when they can catch a wild boar, or to welcome a guest in their rurungan.

The epic singer can be male or female, often learning the epics from older relatives or well-known singers in the community. The singing of epics usually takes place in the evening and is dictated by the singer's preference; the evening is quieter and it allows for deeper concentration on the singer, who sometimes sings for two to four hours as a time. Virgilio Resma reports that Perena, a female singer, sang The Tale of Sandayo from 9 PM to 3 AM for seven nights in 1980. Among the Ifugaos, the hudhud may sung during daytime as a harvest song.

=== Adventures of the Hero ===
Philippine folk epics describe the adventures of the hero and can be classified into two groups: epics of romance, in which the main adventures consist of the hero's courting of specific women or his search for beautiful women he can marry, and epics in which the hero undertakes adventures mainly in the service of his family, his country, his people, and for others. Epics that prove the hero's valor and worth as a man also belong to the second group. These two groups are not mutually exclusive, and predominantly romantic epics also contain adventures of the other kind and vice versa.

Primary examples of epics in the first group are Lam-Ang, the Ulalim, Labaw Donggon, Bantugan, Lumalindaw, and Kudaman. However, some of these epics are not exclusively of the first group. For example, Lam-Ang's first adventure was his quest for his father who had gone to fight the Igorots and never came back.

In the second group of epics, examples include the Agyu cycle of epics, The Maiden of the Buhong Sky, Tulalang, the Hudhud hi Aliguyon, the three Subanon epics, Ibalon, Tuwaang Attends a Wedding, Maharadia Lawana, and Tudbulul.

=== Characteristics of the Hero ===
The Philippine epic heroes are by definition strong and brave, of great fighting prowess, and possess determination and endurance. Philippine epic heroes are also endowed with supernatural or magic powers and possess magic objects and/or animals and even guardians or friendly spirits, sometimes voices, that advise them in moments of need.

The life of a Philippine epic hero usually follows a pattern, similar to the Hero's journey:

1. He is born of unusual circumstances.
2. He undergoes miraculous growth into manhood and is possessed of a restlessness to set out on adventures.
3. He lives a life of action and adventure, in the course of which he displays his heroic qualities.
4. He is victorious in all his adventures, warlike or amorous.
5. If he dies, he is brought back to life and lives happily ever after.

The Philippine epic hero is usually depicted as having an impressive physical appearance and is usually described as such. The Subanon hero, Sandayo, is described as:

A handsome datu
Radiant and resplendent
As if he stood not
On earthly ground
Straight as a tree
Like a son of Diwata
Like some rare flower
Beautiful to behold

==== Supernatural powers ====
One of the most distinctive characteristics of Philippine epic heroes is their possession of supernatural powers, or magic animals and/or objects. The Ifugao hero, Aliguyon, is a notable exception to this rule, being the only one with no extraordinary power beyond his natural prowess.

The range of the hero's supernatural prowess ranges from the mild to the extraordinary. Except for their endurance, the heroes in the Ifugao hudhud are down-to-earth and benign in comparison to other heroes. In contrast, heroes in Central and South Philippine epics cannot continue without mana, or some supernatural being aiding them, or without the magical properties of the tools that they use.

=== Conventions ===
Philippine folk epics have some shared conventions that differ from other classical epics. Philippine folk epics may or may not have formal openings. Lam-Ang, for example, opens with "Listen then while I narrate at length the life of Lam-Ang", while Aliguyon opens without much formality: "Aliguyon, son of Amtalao, who resided in Hannanga one early morning said, 'Where are you, comrades of Aliguyon, do what is done in Hannanga'?" Epics belonging to the Agyu cycle vary in that they have formal openings, called the ke`ppu`unpu`un, which is the introductory part of the entire cycle of epics. Attached to this is the sengedurug, which represents an account of a portion of Agyu's life in Nelendangan, the earth name of his paradise. The Taiwan cycle also has an introductory part called the tabbayanon, consisting of two parts: the first is subjective and speaks of the singer's love, dreams, and frustrations. The prelude closes with a "tail", which serves to connect it to the main body of the story.

Philippine epics narrate the adventures of the hero in chronological order, many of them beginning with the hero's birth. None begin in medias res like in the Iliad. The epics narrate the hero's life and adventures and end in happy endings. If the hero dies, he is brought back to life. In at least two epics, the hero brings his people to heaven. Only Lumalindaw diverts from this with a somber ending, where, after giving parting advice to his children, enters the cave where the Voice that has guided his life resides, and is seen no more.

==== Repetition ====
A common convention is the use of repetition of various kinds: repetition of a scene, repetition of lines, rituals, and formulaic passages. In Labaw Donggon, the hero goes courting three times and the same lines he speaks to his mother are repeated. Some motifs are also repeated under the significance attached to the number. Subanon epics, for example, hold the numbers 7 and 8 in special significance. In Ag Tobig nog Keboklagan, Taake, when seven months old, cries for seven days and seven nights; sleeps for seven days and seven nights; goes fishing for seven days and seven nights; catching seven bins of fish; sleeps again for seven days and nights and awakes a young man; travels for seven months before reaching Keboklagan; courts the Lady of Pintawan for seven days before she accepts; the rumor of this marriage spreads for seven days before it reaches the Datus of Keboklagan, who plans to kill him within seven days; Taake and his companions rest in Dibaloy for seven nights; they journey back to Sirangan for seven days, and he holds a buklog for seven days.

In both Taake and Sandayo, special attention is given to the hero's hair. Their hair is oiled, combed, and arranged to eight folds. Sandayo has his hair oiled and combed eight times, and wound eight times. When he sleeps, eight tiers of mosquito nets are placed over him. When he drinks wine, he empties eight wine jars. His robe has eight folds.

==== Otherworldly journeys ====
Philippine folk epics sometimes extend to the realm of heavenly regions and the underworld. In Labaw Donggon, the hero courts his wives across three worlds. Similarly, the Gaddang hero Lumalindaw seeks his fourth wife, Caligayan, in the Underworld, in a place called Nadaguingan, guarded by dwarfs. In Tuwaang attends a Wedding, Tuwaang descends to the Underworld during his fight with the Young Man of Sakadna. In the Tale of Sandayo, Bolak Sonday searches for Sandayo in the Underworld when he dies. When Bolak Sonday dies, Mendepesa is sent to look for her soul.

== Developments ==
When Islamic missionaries came to Mindanao and converted the Moros, Mindanaoan epics changed to conform to the new faith. In the epic of Maranao, Darangen, for instance, they have made Muslim prophet Muhammad as the forefather of the hero, Bantugen. Today, there are twenty-one epics that survived from Visayas and Mindanao, but others did not. Some of the epics, especially in Luzon, perceived to center on pagan beliefs and rituals, were burned and destroyed by Spanish friars during the Spanish colonization of the Philippines islands in the 16th century. There are only two folk epics that survived from Luzon.

Truly, there were substantial writings by early natives that Jesuit historian Fr. Pedro Chirino noted: "All of the islanders are much given to reading and writing. And there is hardly a man, much less a woman who did not read and write." (Relacion de las isles Filipinas-1604).

Established epic poems of notable quality and length blossomed. Early historians like Padre Colin, Joaquín Martínez de Zúñiga and Antonio Pigafetta have all attested to the existence of these epics. There were even reports of a dramatic play given by natives at the arrival of Don Miguel López de Legazpi in 1565.

Epic poems and songs about the exploits of enchanted folk heroes were performed during festivities and proper occasions. Most often, these epic poems (folk epics or ethno-epics) were titled after the names of the hero involved, except for some which carry traditional titles like the Kalinga Ullalim; the Sulod Hinilawod; the Maranao Darangen; or the Bicol Ibalon.

Stories about folk heroes of long ago were described as "Old Time History" because; they can be used to study the lifestyle and beliefs of the people who produced them. They were also referred to as "Lost" because they were soon forgotten by natives influenced heavily by Spanish and "western" colonization.

The famed orientalist, Chauncey Starkweather, stressed that: "These epic romances are charming poems in the Malayan literature."

Some scholars however dispute the claim that in the early days of Spanish intrusion, priests in their zealous rage against paganism destroyed all existing records, as well as all forms of writing and artworks, regarding ancient Philippine folk heroes. These scholars, mostly schooled in Catholic schools and Catholics themselves, hold that the colorful and fascinating literature of pre-Hispanic Filipinos is still here, giving the new generation an overview of a heritage that is unique and deemed as an invaluable source of joy and information with regards to the lifestyle, love, and aspirations of early Filipinos.

Indeed, it is through these surviving epics every Filipino may mirror his or her national identity.

It is through these folk epics that Filipinos can feel heroic through authentic cultural force. An epic history of the Filipinos comes with epic characters like "biag ni lamang".

== Philippine epic poems ==
Two epic poems originated among Christian Filipinos in Luzon; the Biag ni Lam-ang of Ilocos and the Ibalong of Bicol. Many more epics in Luzon came from the non-Christian groups of the Cordilleras, such as the Ifugao Hudhud and Alim, Kalinga Ulalim, and Gaddang Lumalindaw. Surviving epics from the Visayas are Suludnon Hinilawod of the central Panay highlands and Kudaman of Palawan. The epics from Mindanao are The Maiden of the Bushong Sky, the Tuwaang Attends A Wedding, Agyu, The Tulelangan of the Ilianon Manoboc, The Darangen of the Maranaos, Guman of Dumalinao, Ag Tubig Nog Keboklagan (The Kingdom of Keboklagan), Keg Sumba Neg Sandayo (The Tale of Sandayo) and The Tudbulul of the T'boli of South Cotabato.

From the Bicol Region comes the Ibalong. The Ibalong relates the mystical origins of the first man and the first woman of Aston and Ibalong, which are current provinces of Camarines, Albay, Sorsogon, Catanduanes, and Masbate. Handing, one of the heroes of Ibalong (along with Baltog and Bantong) was a great leader of warriors. He won over the seductive serpent Oriol before starting a village. His village prospered and soon, other friends of Handiong went to help him in leading the village. The system of writing was introduced by Surat. Dinahong Pandak taught them how to make jars, utensils in cooking, and farming implements like the plow and harrow. Weaving cloth was known with the help of Hanlon. Lastly, Ginantong taught them to make boats, blades, knives, and things used in a house. Events in this epic also had a flood story similar to that of the Biblical Genesis. This epic has the story of how the Mayon Volcano was made.

The Darangen tells of the sentimental and romantic adventures of noble warriors, one of them, is about a warrior-prince called Bantugan. Prince Bantugen was the brother of the chieftain of a village called Bumbaran. Bantugen owned a magic shield, was protected by divine spirits called "Tonongs" and was capable of rising from the dead. Once his enemies attacked Bumbaran, thinking he was dead. In the nick of time, Bantugan's soul was recovered and he saved the village. There is also an episode, where Prince Bantugen was on a quest and fought his enemies with his magic Kampilan(Native sword). Soon, he got tired and fell onto the water. A crocodile delivered him to his enemies, but he regained his strength, escaped his captors, and commands an oarless ship and won the battle.

There were also "Darangen epic poetries that relate stories of wars about abducted princesses. Just like the chronicles of the Trojan War.

The Darangen is one of the oldest and longest Philippine epic poetries. Several nights were needed to recite the twenty-five chapters.

There were Philippine epic poems written and published much later. The Ibong Adarna, whose author is unknown, was written in Tagalog and published in the 18th century, while Florante at Laura, also in Tagalog, authored by Francisco Balagtas, was published in the 19th century. In 1961, Ricaredo Demetillo published Barter in Panay, claimed to be the first literary epic of the Philippines. It was written in English. Other contemporary epics were authored by Dr. Cirilo Bautista, whose epic was written in three decades and placed at 9,872 lines in length, The Trilogy of Saint Lazarus, comprises The Archipelago (1970), The Telex Moon (1975) and Sunlight On Broken Stones (1999) and Edwin Cordevilla's Ten Thousand Lines Project For World Peace (2013), which as the title suggests, is 10,000 lines long. Both epics were written in English.

== Cycles ==
There are multiple epic texts that can be found in the Philippines, owing to its diverse cultural background. To date, over twenty have been collected, transcribed, and published by academic scholars.

- Epics from Luzon
  - From Christian Filipinos:
  1. Biag ni Lam-Ang from the Ilocos region
  2. Ibalon, from the Bicol region
  - From non-Christian groups:
  1. Hudhud and Alim of the Ifugao people
  2. The Ulalim cycle of the Kalinga people
  3. The Epic of Lumalindaw of the Gaddang people
- Epics from Visayas
  1. The Hinilawod of the Suludnon in Panay
    - Hinilawod I: The Epic of Labaw Donggon
    - Hinilawod II: Epic of Humadapnen
  2. The Kudaman of Palawan
- Epics from Mindanao
  1. The Maiden of the Buhong Sky
  2. Tuwaang Attends a Wedding
  3. The Agyu Cycle:
    - Agyu: The Ilianon Epic of Mindanao
    - Ulahigan
    - The Capture of Nalandangan
    - The Epic of Nalandangan
    - Olaging: The Battle of Nalandangan
  4. The Tulelangan of the Ilianon Manobos
  5. The Darangen of the Maranao people
  6. Gumao of Dumalinao
  7. Ag Tubig Nog Keboklagan (The Kingdom of Keboklagan)
  8. Keg Sumba Neg Sandayo (The Tale of Sandayo)
  9. The Tudbulul of the Tboli people

== See also ==
- Philippine literature
  - Ilokano literature
