= Gilda Cordero-Fernando =

Filipino writer (1930–2020)

Gilda Cordero Fernando
- Born: June 4, 1930; Manila, Insular Government of the Philippine Islands, U.S.
- Died: August 27, 2020 (aged 90); Manila, Philippines
- Resting place: Garden Of The Divine Word, Christ the King Mission Seminary, Quezon City
- Education: Ateneo de Manila University
- Occupations: Publisher and writer
- Spouse: Atty. Marcelo Fernando
- Children: 4
- Parent(s): Narciso Cordero and Consuelo Luna Cordero

Gilda Cordero-Fernando (June 4, 1930 – August 27, 2020) was a Filipino writer, publisher, visual artist, fashion designer, theater producer, and social activist known for writing and publishing numerous works exploring Filipino culture, for her influence as a mentor and supporter of many of the Philippines cultural workers, and for her prominent "colorful presence in the Philippine literary scene."

== Early life and education ==
She was born in Manila, has a B.A. from St. Theresa's College-Manila, and an M.A. from the Ateneo de Manila University.

== Early career ==
Cordero-Fernando's early literary career, from 1952 to 1970, focused mostly on short fiction. Some of these were published in two collections of short stories: The Butcher, The Baker and The Candlestick Maker (1962) and A Wilderness of Sweets (1973). These books were later compiled and reissued as the Story Collection (1994). Her short stories are regularly taken up in college English classes in the Philippines, and have been widely anthologized.

During this period, she also gained acclaim for her column "Tempest in a Teapot" in the Manila Chronicle, before the newspaper was shut down during Martial Law.

== Filipino Heritage and shift to nonfiction ==
After the declaration of Martial Law by Ferdinand Marcos led to the closure of the newspapers, Cordero-Fernando shifted her focus towards nonfiction work. Her work on Filipino Heritage, a 10-volume study on Philippine history and culture published by Lahing Pilipino in 1978, marked a shift away from her early focus on fiction, and towards nonfiction works exploring various aspects of Filipino culture. Many of these were published under GCF Books, but there were also books released under different publishers, such as Philippine Food and Life, her 1992 collaboration with Alfredo Roces published by Anvil Books.

== GCF Books ==
After working on Filipino Heritage, Cordero-Fernando decided to get into publishing, and founded GCF Books which published a dozen titles that deal with various aspects of Philippine culture and society.

== Activism against the Marcos dictatorship ==
Cordero-Fernando also engaged in political activism against the Marcos dictatorship after the assassination of Ninoy Aquino, creating the "Los Enemigos" group with Odette Alcantara which crafted satirical works about the ills of the Marcos regime. She later published an account of political activism during this period, contributing a chapter to Ferdinand C. Llanes' account “Tibak Rising: Activism in the Days of Martial Law."

== Later artistic endeavors ==
The 1990s saw Cordero-Fernando shifting from books to a number of other artistic roles, including that of visual artist, fashion designer, playwright, art curator and producer.

In February 2000, she produced the stage play Luna: An Aswang Romance.

== Wake and Death ==
Cordero-Fernando died of a lingering illness on August 27, 2020, at the age of 90.

Her death took place during the COVID-19 Pandemic, so it was not possible to have a wake upon her death. However, her children noted that Cordero-Fernando had decided to celebrate her own wake eight years earlier in 2012, gathering ten "shock proof" friends to attend the event. The family's announcement of her death said "Inimitably, [she] held her own wake earlier thus, there will be no need for funeral services."

== Famous works ==
- 1962 - The Butcher, The Baker and The Candlestick Maker
- 1973 - A Wilderness of Sweets
- 1977 - Streets of Manila
- 1978 - Filipino Heritage
- 1978 - Turn of the Century
- 1980 - Philippine Ancestral Houses
- 1981 - Being Filipino
- 1987 - The History of the Burgis
- 1989 - Folk Architecture
- 1991 - The Soul Book
- 1992 - Philippine Food and Life
- 2000 - Luna: An Aswang Romance

== Awards and legacy ==
Cordero-Fernando has won the Carlos Palanca Memorial Award numerous times, and was bestowed its Gawad Dangal ng Lahi in 2014.

She was the Patnubay ng Sining Awardee for literature during the 1993 Araw ng Maynila (Manila Day), and she was the Cultural Center of the Philippines' Gawad Awardee for literature and publishing in 1994.

The Ateneo de Manila University awarded her its Gawad Tanglaw ng Lahi in 2008.

Cordero-Fernando has been nominated to the Order of National Artists of the Philippines numerous times, but her nomination was infamously set aside each time as a result of what Philippine Art journalists have called the "horse trading" associated with the award.

== See also ==
- E. Arsenio Manuel
- Damiana Eugenio
