= Damiana Eugenio =

Filipino writer (1921–2014)

Damiana L. Eugenio
- Born: September 27, 1921; San Miguel, Bulacan, Philippine Islands
- Died: October 10, 2014 (aged 93); Philippines
- Education: University of the Philippines, Mount Holyoke College, University of California, Nueva Ecija High School
- Occupations: Professor, author

Damiana Ligon Eugenio (September 27, 1921 – October 10, 2014) was a Filipino female author and professor who was known as the Mother of Philippine Folklore, a title she received in 1986. Apart from teaching at the University of the Philippines, she has several publications in the field of Philippine folklore, among them a series of seven books which she compiled and edited.

== Early life and education ==
Eugenio attended Nueva Ecija High School in Cabanatuan. She later graduated cum laude from the University of the Philippines with a BSE degree. She obtained her master's degree in English Literature and folklore. She was a professor at the Department of English and Comparative Literature for the College of Arts in Diliman.

== Career ==
Eugenio taught at the University of the Philippines.

Her works were described as thorough and professional in presentation and as being valuable resources for scholars studying the Philippines and comparative folklore. Written in the English language, her Philippine Folk Literature: The Myths (1993) served as a compendium that promotes "national and international access to Filipino folklore." Its contents were gathered from written sources rather than collected oral variants. The collection was intended to foster interest in the subject matter. In this work, Eugenio also presented the collected narratives in a proper scholarly context that also justified the inclusion of the legends of saints, as opposed to being a pure collection of myths. This particular volume was also described as a recommended work for "any individual interested in issues of Filipino worldviews and value systems, to any scholar investigating myths across cultures, and to anyone who enjoys the insights that a culture's narratives provide."

== Awards and recognition ==
- Lifetime Achievement Award from the Philippine Board on Books for Young People (PPBY Awards) by the University of the Philippines Folklorists, Inc. and the University of the Philippines Folklore Studies Program (1986) for her significant contributions to the growth of literacy for children in 1991
- Most Outstanding Novo Ecijano in the Field of Arts for Literature (Nueva Ecija High School Alumni Association, 1983)
- Professional Achievement Award in the Humanities for folklore studies (U.P. Alumni Association, 1987)
- Best Book in English, Catholic Mass Media Award (finalist, 1987)
- National Book Award for Literary History (Manila Critic Circle, 1987)
- Achievement Award in the Humanities (Philippine National Science Society/NCRP, 1989)
- Cultural Center of the Philippines Award for the Arts (1992) for cultural research
- Golden Jubilarian Achievement Award (U.P. Education Alumni Association, 1992)
- National Follower of Balagtas Award (Gawad Pambansang Alagad ni Balagtas, from the Unyon ng mga Manunulat sa Pilipinas or the Philippine Writers Union, UMPIL, 1993)
- Manila Critics Circle Citation (1995)
- Centennial Award for Cultural Research (Parangal Sentenyal sa Sining at Kultura (Cultural Center of the Philippines, 1999)
- Most Distinguished Alumna of the Nueva Ecija High School (1999)
- Silver Torch Award (U.P. Educational Alumni Association, 2000)

== Personal life and demise ==
Eugenio died on October 10, 2014. She had a bad fall in December 2013 and became bed ridden since.

== Works ==
- Philippine Proverb Lore (1975)
- Awit and Korido: A Study of Fifty Philippine Metrical Romances in Relation to Their Sources and Analogues (1965)
- Philippine Folk Literature: An Anthology (1981)
- Philippine Folk Literature, (May 31, 2008)

== See also ==
- Philippine mythology
- Philippine folk literature
- Philippine proverbs
- E. Arsenio Manuel
