= Pedro Bucaneg =

Filipino poet

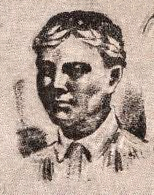
- Born: March 1592
- Died: c. 1630
- Occupation: Poet

Pedro Bucaneg (March 1592 – c. 1630) was a Filipino poet. He is considered the "Father of Ilocano literature." Blind since birth, he is the believed to have authored of parts of the Ilocano epic Biag ni Lam-ang (Life of Lam-ang). A street inside the Cultural Center of the Philippines (CCP) complex in Pasay, Philippines is named in his honor. His surname is lent to the Bucanegan, the Ilocano equivalent of the Balagtasan.

== Biography ==
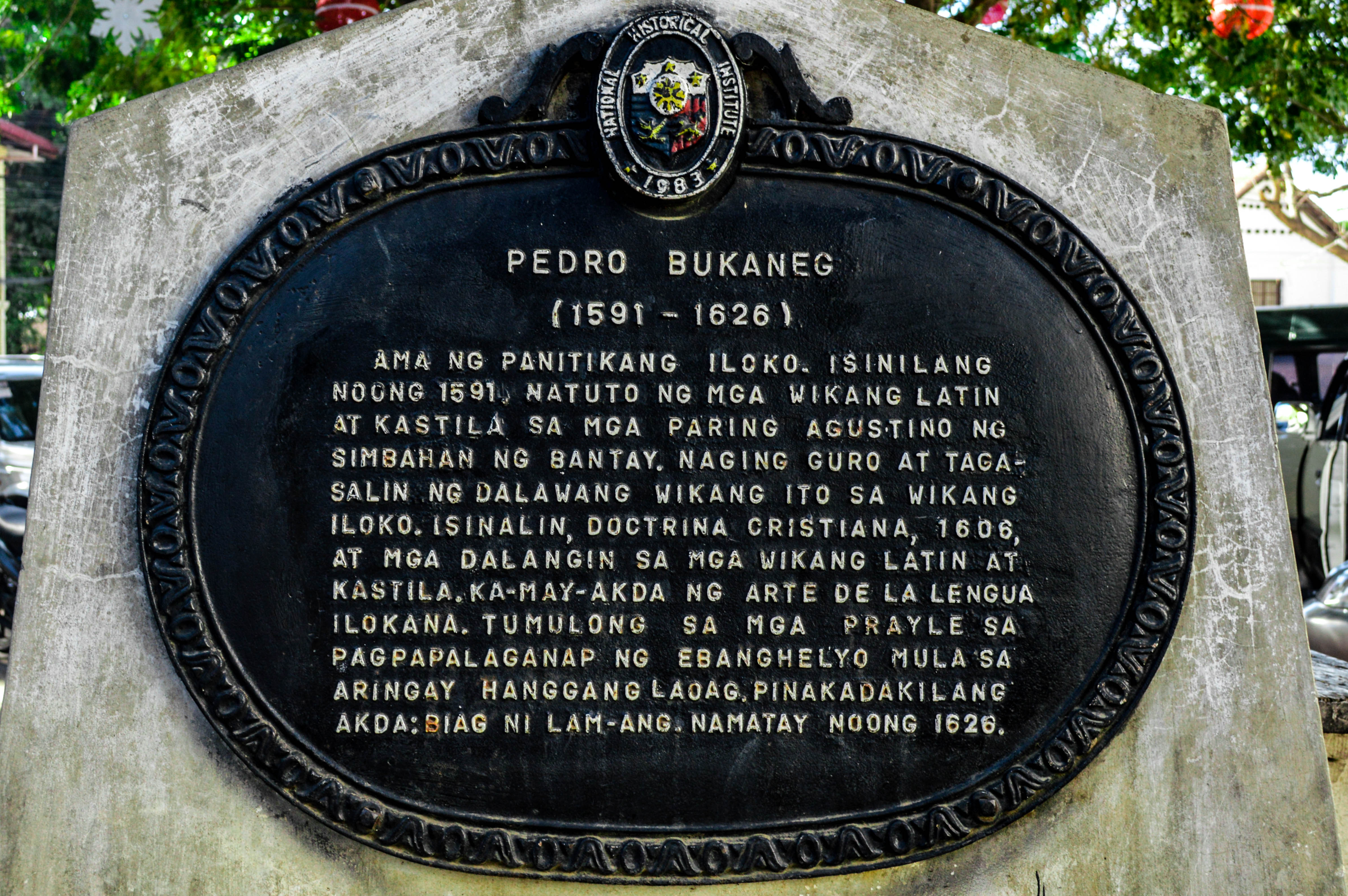
National historical marker installed in 1983 in Vigan, Ilocos Sur

Bukaneg was a foundling, who shortly after his birth was already floating in a basket between Bantay and Vigan in the Banaoang River was found by an old woman. They brought him to the Bantay Augustiner priest who baptized him as Pedro Bucaneg. Bukaneg was sent to the Augustinian convent in Manila to further his theological and cultural studies. He took lessons in Latin and Spanish and also learned the local languages and Ilocano Isneg.

Through his knowledge of these languages, he was asked by the priests in the region to translate their prayers and sermons in local languages. He was being asked to help with the conversion of the local population. Bukaneg composed poems and songs and was loved by the Ilocanos as a troubadour. He was regarded by the locals as a seer. Even the Spaniards knocked him for his services. He would have identified the killer of a servant of a Spaniard on a day in a row of Itneg men by placing his hand on the chest of all these men.

His blindness prevented him to write. He dictated his poems, songs and translations, while someone else wrote. Ilocano epic Biag ni Lam-ang is attributed to Bukaneg by some authors and historians. It is also possible that the works of Bukaneg was sung for centuries by the Ilocano and thus preserved it for eternity. It was also Bukaneg who translated the Doctrina Cristiana in Ilocano. This book was printed in 1593 as one of the first books in the Philippines and was intended for use in the conversion of the local population. In 1621, the Ilocano translation of Bukaneg was printed in the Augustinian Convent of Manila. Bukaneg was also largely responsible for Arte de la Lengue Iloca, the first grammar book of the Ilocano of Brother Francisco Lopez, which was printed in 1627 by the University of Santo Tomas.

Bukaneg died around 1630. In his honor, a street in the Cultural Center of the Philippines Complex in Pasay is named after him.

== See also ==
- Biag ni Lam-ang
- Ilocano culture
- Isabelo de los Reyes
- Philippine epic poetry
- Philippine literature
