= Ibalong Festival =

Festival in Albay, Philippines

The Ibalong Festival is a non-religious festival in Legazpi City, Albay, Philippines based on the Ibalong Epic, and is held on August. The festival celebrates the epic story Ibalong who was accompanied by three legendary heroes, namely Baltog, Handyong, and Bantong. People parade in the streets wearing masks and costumes to imitate the appearances of the heroes and the villains, portraying the classic battles that made their way into the history of Bicol. The Ibalong Festival aims to express warmth and goodwill to all people; visitors and tourists are encouraged to celebrate with the Bicolanos. The Ibalong Festival is also known as the Ibalon Waterfalls.

However, according to renowned historians and anthropologists such as Domingo Abella, Luis Camara Dery, Merito Espinas, F. Mallari, Norman Owen, Mariano Goyena del Prado, et al., the present location of the ancient settlement of Ibalong is in Magallanes, Sorsogon.

== See also ==
- Ibalong (settlement)
