= Hinilawod =

Philippine epic poem

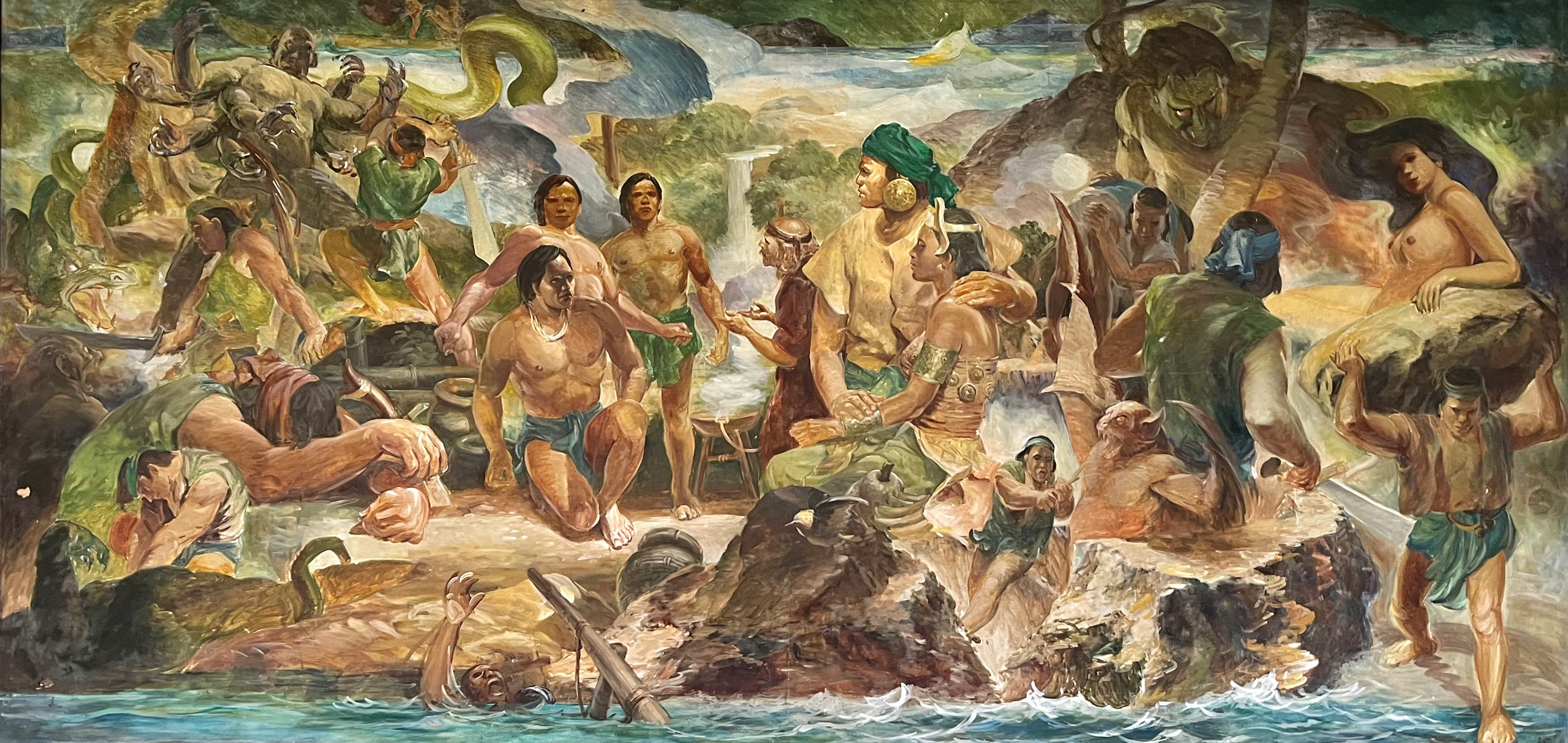
Hinilawod (1983) by Gerochi

Hinilawod is an epic poem orally transmitted from early inhabitants of a place called Sulod in central Panay, Philippines. The term "Hinilawod" generally translates to "Tales from the Mouth of the Halawod River". The epic must have been commonly known to the Visayans of Panay before the Spanish colonial period, since its main protagonists, like Labaw Donggon, were noted in early Spanish accounts of the local beliefs. One of these accounts says the adventures of the ancient hero of Panay were recounted during weddings and in songs.

It was noted that there were still native mundos of Dingle, Iloilo who worshipped Labaw Donggon even until the last years of Spanish rule in the late nineteenth century. These worshippers would stealthily enter a certain cave in Dingle on the evening of a certain day of the year, in order to render homage and to offer poultry, doves, rice, bananas, and pigs to the ancient Visayan god.

The Hinilawod Epic Chant Recordings, housed at the Henry Luce III Library of Central Philippine University, have been inscribed in the UNESCO Memory of the World Register. This marks Iloilo City's second UNESCO recognition, following its designation as the first Creative City of Gastronomy in the Philippines, and is the first documentary heritage outside Manila to receive this honor.

== Discovery ==
Hinilawod was first discovered "by accident" in 1955, when Filipino anthropologist F. Landa Jocano became interested in native folklore. He journeyed through the remote areas of his native island of Panay with two colleagues, gathering traditional folk songs, stories, and riddles. It was during one of those trips to upland barrios in the towns of Lambunao, Maasin, Janiuay, and Calinog in Iloilo that he was informed of a long and popular tale called Hinilawod. Portions of the story were performed to him and his colleague by an old man called Ulang Udig.

Returning the following year with a radio technician from Central Philippine University, Jocano recorded a portion of the story on tape in 1956. However, when he returned to make a complete recording in 1957, Ulang Udig could only chant the Epic of Labaw Donggon, but could no longer narrate the much longer Epic of Humadapnon. Weeks later, Ulang Udig introduced Jocano to his aunt, an old babaylan named Udungan. However, she could only chant bits of the Humadapnon portion. Jocano was later introduced to Hugan-an, the niece of Udungan and a mountain singer. After being persuaded for some time, she agreed to have herself recorded while sharing her personal story and recounting the epic Hinilawod. It took three weeks to complete the recording of the 30-hour epic poem.

== Plot ==
Hinilawod recounts the story of the exploits of three Suludnon demigod brothers: Labaw Donggon, Humadapnon and Dumalapdap of ancient Panay.

=== Alunsina and Datu Paubari ===
Kaptan, king of the Gods, decreed that the beautiful Alunsina (also called Laun Sina, "Unmarried One") be wed upon reaching maidenhood. Although unmarried gods from different parts of the universe sought to marry her, she ultimately chose Datu Paubari, a mortal who ruled over Halawod, as her husband.

Upset by Alunsina’s choice, her rejected suitors joined forces to plot against the newly married couple. Maklium-sa-t'wan, the god of the plains, called a council of the gods. The deities decided to destroy the Halawod by flood.

Fortunately for Alunsina and her husband, her sister Suklang Malayon, the goddess and guardian of happy homes, discovered the evil plot and warned them of it. Before the flood, the couple sought refuge on higher ground and escaped the gods' wrath undetected. They returned to the plains and settled near the mouth of the Halawod after the floods subsided and lived in secrecy.

After several months, Alunsina was pregnant with triplets. The couple were ecstatic, and Datu Paubari prepared the things needed for childbirth including the siklot. When the triplets were born, the couple named them Labaw Donggon, Humadapnon, and Dumalapdap.

Immediately after birthing her sons, Alunsina summoned the high priest Bungot-Banwa to perform rites on Mount Madya-as to ensure good health for the triplets. Bungot-Banwa burned some alanghiran fronds along with a pinch of kamangyan (incense) on an altar that he had built. He opened the windows of the north side of the room after the ceremony, and in came a cold wind that transformed the infants into strong, mighty, and handsome young men.

=== The adventures of Labaw Donggon ===
When he reached adulthood, Labaw Donggon, the eldest of the triplets, decided to go on a quest to find himself a wife. He heard of the beauty of Anggoy Ginbitinan of Handug and wanted her for a wife. He asked his mother to prepare the things he will need for the journey—a magic cape, hat, belt, and kampilan (a large, two-handed sword).

The journey to Handug took several days through plains, valleys, and mountains. When Labaw Donggon finally arrived, he asked for an audience with Anggoy Ginbitinan's mother and asked for her hand in marriage. The marriage was finalized when Labaw Donggon's parents met and discussed with Anggoy Ginbitinan's parents. Using his pamlang (magical charm), Labaw Donggon effortlessly conjured a giant house with ten rooftops and a hundred doors.

After their wedding, Labaw Donggon and his new bride started on their journey back to his lands. Upon reaching home, Labaw Donggon asked his mother to care for his new wife and announced his intent on another quest, this time to the Rugal sa Idalom (the netherworld) and vie for the hand of the beautiful Anggoy Doronoon.

Labaw Donggon won the hand of the Anggoy Doronoon with little difficulty, and also took her home to his mother. Thereafter, the demigod went on third quest to the Eastern Sky. This time the object of his desire is Malitong Yawa Sinagmaling Diwata, the young bride of Saragnayan, the Lord of Darkness.

Aboard his biday nga inagta (black boat), Labaw Donggon sailed across many seas and flew across the region of the clouds and the Land of Stones before he found himself at the shores of the Eastern Sky and the fortress of Saragnayan. Upon setting foot on the shore, Saragnayan asked who he was and what was his business. When Labaw Donggon expressed his desire to have Saragnayan's young wife Malitong Yawa Sinagmaling Diwata, the Lord of Darkness laughed and told him it was impossible. The young demigod then challenged Saragnayan to a duel.

The duel lasted for years. Labaw Donggon held Saragnayan's head underwater for seven years but Saragnayan survived. Labaw Donggon then tied Saragnayan to the top of a rock and beat him hard with a coconut trunk, but this proved futile. Labaw Donggon then hurled Saragnayan upwards towards the sky, yet failed to kill him. The two fought for many years until finally, Labaw Donggon weakened. Saragnayan imprisoned the exhausted demigod under his pig pen.

Meanwhile, Labaw Donggon's two wives each gave birth to a son. Anggoy Ginbitinan called her child Aso Mangga, while Anggoy Doronoon called her son Buyung Baranugon. Both sons went in search of their father a few days after they were born. They arrived in the Eastern Sky and asked Saragnayan to free their father. Saragnayan instead summoned a host of minions from the underworld to defeat the youths. Wielding bows, Aso Mangga and Buyung Baranugon shot poisoned arrows, that dealt seven wounds with a single shot, slaying the rest until only Saragnayan remained.

Saragnayan wrestled with Buyung Baranugon, but the Lord of Darkness was no match for him. However, Saragnayan could still not die. Buyung Baranugon sought aid from his grandmother, Alunsina, and learned that Saragnayan's life was housed in the body of a boar in a place called Paling Bukid. The son then killed the boar and ate its heart, rendering Saragnayan mortal.

Sensing that death was near, Saragnayan bade a sorrowful farewell to his wife. Buyung Baranugon finally killed Saragnayan by jabbing poisoned arrows into both of Saragnayan's eyes. After the victory, Buyung Baranugon and Aso Mangga failed to find their father, who hid under a fishnet out of fear during the battle. Believing their father to have returned home before them, the brothers sailed home only to realize that Labaw Donggon was still missing.

Humadapnon and Dumalapdap then searched for their missing brother, finding Labaw Donggon under the fishnet in a deranged state. Labaw Donggon's brothers returned him home to his wives. Anggoy Ginbitinan and Anggoy Doronoon cured Labaw Donggon from his madness and his former strength returned to him.

=== The adventures of Humadapnon ===
Meanwhile, the defeat of Labaw Donggon at the hands of Saragnayan and his subsequent imprisonment angered his brothers Humadapnon and Dumalapdap. Humadapnon swore by the gods of Madya-as that he would seek revenge on all of Saragnayan's kinsmen and followers. He then embarked on a journey to the Eastern Sky, taking with him Buyong Matanayon of Mount Matiula, a man known for his exceptional swordsmanship. Together, they travelled the same path that Labaw Donggon had taken.

Along the journey, the two met sorceress Piganun, who had taken the form of a beautiful woman and enchanted Humadapnon to the point that he did not wish to leave. After seven months in Tarambang Buriraw, Buyong Matanayon recalled that they brought some ginger with them. He thought of a plan to break Piganun's spell over his friend. One evening, over dinner, Buyong Matanayon threw seven slices of ginger into the fire. Upon smelling the burning ginger, Piganun fled the room. Buyong Matanayon then struck Humadapnon in the head, rendering the latter unconscious. He dragged his body away from the place and managed to escape.

Upon reaching the kingdom of Datu Umbaw Pinaumbaw, the path was blocked off by a giant boulder. Humadapnon and Buyong Matanayon tried to walk around the boulder, but it seemed as though it grew wider with every step. They tried to climb it, but it seemed to grow higher with every step. Humadapnon rose to the challenge and put on his magic cape. He then was able to lift the huge boulder off the center of the village and hurled it back towards the mountain. Datu Umbaw Pinaumbaw honored his word and gave his daughter's hand in marriage to Humadapnon. The two were married and a big feast was held. During the banquet, a guest minstrel sang and extolled the beauty of Burigadang Pada Sinaklang Bulawan, the goddess of wealth and greed. Enchanted by the story, Humadapnon started on a quest to seek the goddess' hand in marriage.

He met Buyong Makabagting, son of the Datu Balahidyong of Paling Bukid, who was also vying for the hand of Burigadang Pada Sinaklang Bulawan. The two duelled and Humadapnon emerged victorious, the defeated Buyong Makabagting helping the former in his quest. Humadapnon eventually married Burigadang Pada Sinaklang Bulawan and brought her home to his mother.

Below are verses from the first two stanzas of the second part of Sugidanun I (First Narration) of the Sulodnon epic Hinilawod: Adventures of Humadapnon chanted by Hugan-an and recorded by Dr. F. Landa Jocano. The epic is in the original Sulodnon language.

- Sugidanun I: Pangayaw
  - 2. Himos

Yabon-yabon pay tun-og
Alimbu pa duyamig
Nagparibung domdom
Hangop abi sa domdom.
Ni Buyong Humadapnon:
"Ti, Taghuy, ku magsalakay
Abi ako magmamkaw
Ku magliali ako sa lawdon
Maglibot sa layagon
Bungayong ako sa sarakyan
Waay ako't panimbang,
Waay it panibin-sibin."

Mahinay tumindug
Mahinay tumimbayug
'I ginuong harangdon.
Kambay dato agtunan
Lubayon kamasuswon
Uwa si Labing Anyag
Sanglit may babaylan
Sanglit hay singday.

- English translation by Dr. F. Landa Jocano

The dew was still fresh
The morning breeze was cold
There he sat wondering
Till and idea came to his mind.
Said Buying Humadapnon:
"Well, Taghuy, were I to travel
Supposing I do embark
If I scour and cross the seas
Travel around, spread my sails
I would be alone in my vessel
I have no assistant
I have no companion."

And slowly he stood
Meditating he took to his feet
The respected master.
He went and approached
His younger sister
Uwa Labing Anyag
Because she was a babaylan.
An skilled in charms.

=== The adventures of Dumalapdap ===
Shortly after Humadapnon left their home to seek revenge on Saragnayan's family and followers, Dumalapdap embarked on a quest of his own. He decided to go to Burutlakan-ka-adlaw and marry Lubay-Lubyok Hanginun si Mahuyokhuyokon, the goddess of the evening breeze. With him was Dumasig, the most powerful wrestler in Madya-as.

After several months of traveling, the two warriors came face to face with a two-headed monster called Balanakon. The monster guarded the ridge that led to the place where the maiden lived. They managed to kill the monster but were confronted with another kind of monster when they reached the gate of the palace where the maiden lived. Called Uyutang, the monster was similar to a bat with sharp, poisonous claws.

Dumalapdap fought with Uyutang for seven months. He was able to defeat the monster when he grabbed its ankle and broke it. Then he took his twang daniwan (magic dagger) and struck Uyutang under the armpit. The monster howled in pain, causing an earthquake that broke the ridge they were fighting in into two. Half of the ridge became an island that is known today as Negros, while the other half became Panay.

With the monster Uyutang dead, Lubay-Lubyok Hanginun si Mahuyokhuyokan was free to marry Dumalapdap. He brought her home and was reunited with his family. Datu Paubari celebrated the return of his three sons with a very big feast. His sons left for different parts of the world after the feast. Labaw Donggon ventured north, Humadapnon went south, and Dumalapdap embarked to the west. Datu Parubari was left to rule in the east.

=== The quest of Humadapnon continues ===
Humdapnon was visited by his spirit friends Taghoy and Duwindi in his dream and told him of lovely maiden who lived in a village by the mouth of the Halawod River. The demigod left his dominion to look for the maiden named Nagmalitong Yawa. He brought with him a boatful of crew.

Humadapnon and his men safely traversed a blood-coloured sea with the help of his spirit friends. They landed on an island that was inhabited by beautiful women and headed by the sorceress, Ginmayunan. For seven years, Humadapnon and his crew were imprisoned in the island until Nagmalitong Yawa helped them escape while disguised as a boy. Humadapnon and Nagmalitong Yawa were married soon after in Halawod.

During the wedding feast, Humadapnon's brother, Dumalapdap fell in love with Huyung Adlaw and asked his brother to help him talk to the parents of the maiden. Humadapnon left his new wife and accompanied his brother to the Upperworld where Huyung Adlaw lived.

It took the brothers seven years to come back from their journey to the Upperworld. They arrived just in time for the ceremony that will have Nagmalitong Yawa married to Buyung Sumagulung, an island fortress ruler, in a ceremony. The brothers were enraged and killed all the guests and the groom. Humadapnon also stabbed his wife because of treachery only to feel remorse later on. He asked his spirit friends and found out that his wife only agreed to marry Buyung Sumagulung because her mother, Matan-ayon, convinced her that Humadapnon is not coming back.

Upon learning of this, Humadapnon asked his sister, Labing Anyag, to use her powers to bring Nagmalitong Yawa back to life. Seeing how remorseful he is, Labing Anyag agreed. However, Nagmalitong Yawa was so ashamed of agreeing to marry Buyung Sumagulung that she ran away to the underworld and sought the protection of her uncle Panlinugun, who is the lord of earthquakes.

Humadapnon had to kill an eight-headed serpent in his pursuit of Nagmalitong Yawa. Then he had to duel with a young man who spirited his wife away. The duel ended when Alunsina intervened and revealed that the young man is her son, Amarotha. This son died during childbirth and was brought back from the dead to keep Alunsina company. Alunsina decided that both Humadapnon and Amarotha deserved a piece of Nagmalitong Yawa so she cut the girl in half and gave a piece each to her sons. Each half turned into a whole live person. Humadapnon brought his wife back to Panay.

== In theatre ==
An abridged version was the first stage performance of the epic during the inauguration of the Cultural Center of Western Visayas on the campus of West Visayas State University in Iloilo City, Philippines in March 1983 under the patronage of the Cultural Center of the Philippines and the former First Lady Imelda Marcos. The cultural group Panayana performed the epic before the representatives of the First Lady and the Cultural Center of the Philippines.

Art Geroche, a local Ilonggo artist and Staff of the West Visayas State College (now West Visayas State University), provided a mural painting (oil on canvas) depicting the epic, for the lobby of the Cultural Center. The painting captures the important scenes in the adventures of the heroes of Hinilawod, in one panoramic view within a six by twelve feet opus of Geroche.

This epic, which is orally transmitted from one generation to another, is still very much a part of the culture of the Sulod Nation in the mountains of Jamindan, Capiz. In April 1999, Alejo Zata recorded the epic as it was chanted by the natives of Sulod.

University of San Agustin Little Theater (USALT) has staged its version of the Humadapnon fragment of the Hinilawod titled "Tarangban" ("Cave"). It first staged the play in 2004. The production was revised to include the participation of then 17-year-old Manilyn "Tata" Glemer, a member of the Panay Bukidnon tribe in Tapaz, Capiz. Glemer is able to chant the epic, and research was conducted with her mother, Gemma, the chieftain of their tribe and her grandmother, Lola Gamak, who is also a binukot and chanter.

Since 2006, the late-January Hirinugyaw-Suguidanonay Festival of the town of Calinog in Central Panay (which started in 1988 as an adaptation of the Dinagyang Festival where it was then known as the Sirinayaw, then Hirinugyaw Festival) has used segments and tales of the Hinilawod as performance themes of its competing tribes. Each performance's authenticity is enhanced through the use of authentic Panay Bukidnon (Sulod) costumes, known as Panubok, and the performing tribes' employment of Panay-Bukidnon Manunuguids (chanters, hence "Suguidanonay" in the festival's name) from the Balay Tulun-an Cultural Preservation School in the Panay-Bukidnon settlement in Brgy. Garangan in Calinog's mountainous areas. Of note is the fact that the town itself sits squarely beside the Jalaur River, its name a corruption of Halawud which gave the epic its name.

It had subsequent stagings of excerpts in 2010 for the "Tanghal 4: The National University and Colleges Theater Festival and Conference" on February 2 at De La Salle-College of Saint Benilde and for "Pasinaya Festival" at Tanghalang Huseng Batute of the Cultural Center of the Philippines on February 7.

There was also a performance on March 1, 2010, at the USALT auditorium.

In 2010, Hiyas Kayumanggi staged their version of the Hinilawod at Luce Auditorium of Silliman University.

In 2011, the group staged their production at Tanghalang Nicanor Abelardo of the Cultural Center of the Philippines on September 3 and 4.

In 2013, Ateneo Entablado staged Nicanor Tiongson's play Labaw Donggon: Ang Banog ng Sanlibutan in Cervini Field, Ateneo de Manila University. The production was directed by Jerry Respeto with composers Jema Pamintuan and Teresa Barrozo, costume and set designer Gino Gonzales, lighting designer Voltaire de Jesus, and choreographers Gio Gahol and Elena Laniog.

== Significance ==
Hinilawod is a 29,000-verse epic that takes about three days to chant in its original form, making it one of the longest epics known, alongside that of Tibet's Epic of King Gesar. Hinilawod is one of the many pieces of oral literature passed from one generation to the next, changed and morphed by the chanter to one degree or another as he told it to his audience. The Hinilawod is not just a literary piece but also a source of information about culture, religion and rituals of the ancient people of Sulod; showing us that ancient Filipinos believed in the "sacred," in the importance of family honour and in personal courage and dignity.

A recorded version of the story of Hinilawod can be found in the book Philippine Mythology authored by Jocano.

In 2024, the Hinilawod Epic Chant Recordings was inscribed in the UNESCO Memory of the World Register – Asia and the Pacific. The chants recorded were from Panay Bukidnon epic chanters “Ulang Udig” from Lambunao, Iloilo and Narcisa “Hugan-an” Lingaya of Tapaz, Capiz, from 1956 to 1957.

== See also ==
- Biag ni Lam-Ang
- Darangen
- Ibalong Epic
