= Ibalong Epic =

Fragment of a folk epic

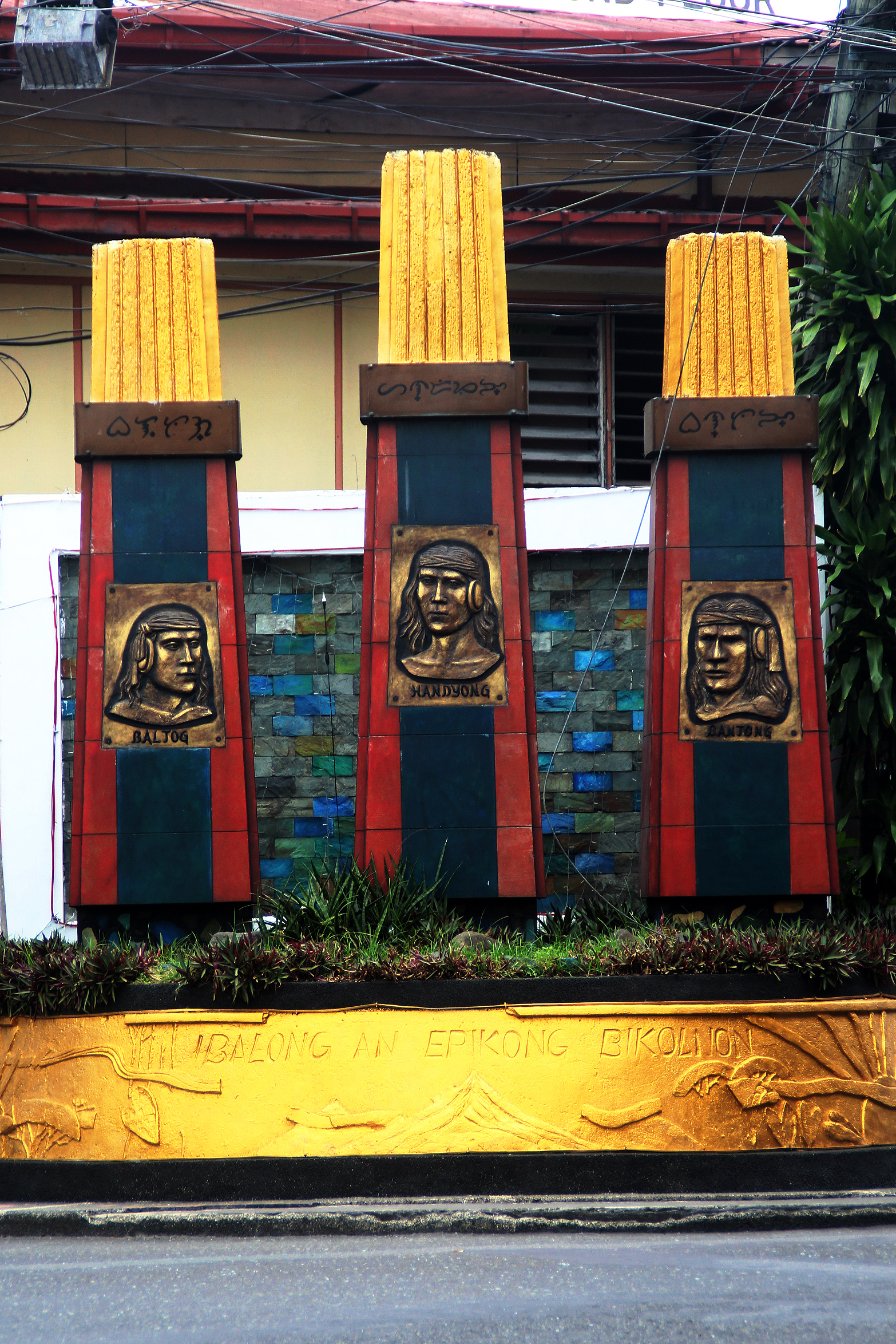
The Ibalon Monument which shows the four (4) heroes of the epic: Tambaloslos, Baltog, Handyong and Bantong in Legazpi City

The Ibálong, also known as Handiong or Handyong, is a 60-stanza fragment of a Bicolano full-length folk epic of the Bicol region of the Philippines, based on the Indian Hindu epics Ramayana and Mahabharata. The epic is said to have been narrated in verse form by a native bard called Kadunung.

It was passed on orally until it was presumably jotted down in its complete Bicol narrative by Fray Bernardino de Melendreras de la Trinidad. The Ibalong portrays deeds in heroic proportions, centering on white men or tawong-lipod who were warrior-heroes named, among others, Tambaloslos, Baltog, Handyong, and Bantong. They came from Boltavara (present-day India), settling and ruling Bicol and its people. The epic is set in the land of Aslon and Ibalong. The mountains Asog, Masaraga, Isarog, and Lingyon were prominent features of the area.

In its oldest known text, the folk epic does not have a title. Its oldest existing account is written in Spanish.

A non-religious festival called the Ibalong Festival is celebrated annually in honor of the epic Ibalong as a commemoration of the Ibalon geography. It is unusual because Spaniards introduced saints and fiestas and all religious-related activities except Ibalong. It is also a celebration of the province's people and their resiliency, given the string of calamities that regularly befall the region given its typhoon-prone geographical location.

== History ==
The full-length narrative is presumably jotted down by Fray Bernardino de Melendreras de la Trinidad (1815-1867), a Franciscan missionary in Guinobatan, Albay, when he got acquainted with an errant Bicolano bard referred to in the epic as Kadunung. It was put afterward into Spanish by Melendreras in Ibal, a 400-page manuscript in verse on the ancient customs of the Albay indios.

The 60-stanza portion was later included in a treatise on the Bicol region by Fray Jose Castaño in 1895. However, no credit was given to Melendreras by Castaño in the work, and so students of the Ibalong have since presumed that it was recorded and translated by Castaño himself.

The full English translation of the Ibalong was published in 1996 in the Far Eastern University Faculty Journal, Manila by Merito B. Espinas.

Luis G. Dato, a Bicolano poet laureate translated the epic into English from the Spanish version of Fray Jose Castaño in 1965.

== Summary ==
The glorious Ibálong of long ago.

Forthwith Kadunung described the ancient land and spoke of its first hero, Baltog, a white Aryan, who had come from Boltavara (Bharata-varsha or India). He planted a taro (linsa) patch in Tondol (now in Kamalig) which, one night, was foraged by Tandayag na Upon, a giant wild boar. The furious Baltog chased Tandayag na Upon, killed it with his bare hands, and hung its enormous jawbones on a talisay tree in front of his house in Tondol. For this marvelous feat, he was acknowledged as chief of the local hunters. The clans of Panicuason and Asog came over to marvel at the monstrous wild boar in Ibálong.

Next to come was Handyong. With his followers, he fought the monsters of the land. But Oryol, a wily serpent who appeared as a beautiful maiden with a seductive voice, was one whom Handyong could not destroy. Meanwhile, Oryol admired Handyong's bravery and gallantry. Because of this, Oryol helped Handyong clear the region of ferocious beasts until peace came to the whole of the land.

With Ibálong rid of wild creatures, Handyong turned to making wise laws and planting the land to linsa and rice. A period of invention followed: boats, farming tools, weaving looms, claywares, kitchen utensils, tree houses, and even a syllabary. Together, the people built a society with culture. It was a golden period in Ibálong when even slaves were respected under the laws of Handyong.

Then came a great flood, freed by Unos, that changed the features of the land. Three volcanoes, named Hantik, Kulasi, and Isarog erupted simultaneously. Inundations caused lands to sink, from which Lake Buhi came about, or rise, as in the strip of seacoast in Pasacao, Camarines Sur, and wiped out many settlements, especially the Dagatnong settlement in the Kalabangan Gulf. The Malbogong Islet formed in the Bicol River while the Inarihan River altered its course. A lofty mountain sank at Bato, forming a lake.

Despite the calamities, Ibálong grew powerful under the elder Handyong, whose constant companion and good friend, by then, was the young Bantong.

Although given a thousand men to destroy the half man and half beast Rabot, who could change its enemies into rocks, Bantong slew it single-handedly – to the loud cheers of his thousand warriors that reverberated throughout the forests and mangrove swamps. Brought to Ligmanan, the corpse of Rabot was horrible to behold that the great Handyong himself was shocked at the sight.

At this point, the Ibálong epic-fragment ends abruptly, and Kadunung promises to continue the story some other time.

=== Curious ending of the Ibálong ===
The fragmentary epic ended at that part where Bantong killed the fierce half-man and beast, Rabot. Curiously, Handyong was saddened by Rabot's death. In her study of the Ibalong Epic, the Bicolano scholar, Ma. Lilia F. Realubit, explained that the reason behind this is that Handyong might have "mourned the passing of an era, when men were proved men by monsters and the skill of the hunt, when magic and ceremonial incantations infused life and explained his questions about life and nature and the supernatural."

She also added that Handyong could have “correctly foresaw the coming of a new age and aptly mourned the death of his time.” Meanwhile, some others speculate that he foresaw the subjugation and destitution of his people under a less benevolent leader - as what, indeed, happened under the Spanish colonial rule.

== Parallelism with Spanish rule ==
The existence of various Bicolano oral accounts focus on a curse allegedly cast against the Bicolano people seem to bridge the gap between the Ibalong epic and the subsequent decline and destitution of the Bicolanos. Some of these oral accounts indicated such a transformation.

In Sorsogon, the legend of San Bernardino embodied this turn of events against the land and its inhabitants. The legend spoke about a mighty spirit who dwelt in Mt. Bulusan and fell in love with a maiden there. This maiden did not love him back, and so the spirit was enraged. Panic filled everyone except one man - the favored suitor of the maiden. He killed the spirit to stop its violence in the area. Once killed, the spirit fell into the sea. The part of the water in which the spirit fell transformed into land. The old folks claim that the two islands with a slender strip of water between Samar and Sorsogon were the spirit of Mt. Bulusan. It is now called the Strait of San Bernardino and is considered enchanted or engkantado.

The parallelism of the events in the Ibálong and the above-cited legend with what actually happened under Spanish rule seems to suggest the total transformation of the inhabitants from a sturdy phase to becoming passive people.

== Setting ==
There is no definite date that can be given to where the epic-fragment starts and ends, however, what little is known about the legendary beginnings of Bicol might describe the area circa 4,500 years ago. The epic-fragment portrays ancient Bicol as lush in jungle growth, teeming with fish and wild game, and dotted by mountain ranges, hills, and volcanoes. The bard Kadunung in the epic recounted this as the glorious Bikolandia, a beautiful and fertile ancient land of long ago, inhabited by strong and brave people, that existed before a catastrophe destroyed it some 4,500 years ago.

=== Volcanoes in Ibalong ===
- Aslong: Meaning "faintly visible", was famous for its tales of sweet enchantment in the glorious days of long ago. Presently, almost nothing is left of it but a few ridges around a shallowing crater.
- Asog: Meaning "with only one testicle", it refers to the effeminate black priests of Aswang's devil-cult that had its center in the wilds of this volcano during Bicol's epic age. It may also refer to a priest dressed like a woman. Asog is now called Mount Iriga.
- Hantik: A big species of ants, the hantiks, gave Hantik its name. The ants are believed to have inhabited this mountain's Kalupnitan Caves, where Handyong drove and buried alive the wily, sweet-voiced serpents that masqueraded as lovely maidens. Hantik might be the Mount Bernacci.
- Isarog: From the word isaro meaning "put together", Isarog was the rugged volcano where the angonglood of the Bikol River forests fled to escape the wrath of Handyong.
- Masaraga: Masaraga is believed to have been where the Sarimao had their cave. The name comes from the intensifier ma and saga, meaning "a brilliant flame" or "glaring".

== Significance ==
The Ibálong is an epic associated with the early history and traditions of the Bicol region. It depicts struggles involving survival, social order and community development, and includes references to natural disasters such as typhoons. The narrative also describes the establishment of laws and other aspects of early Bicolano society.

Among other pursuits is the cultivation of upland and lowland crops, the construction of dwellings on tall trees, the creation of the first boat in the region, the making of utensils, tools, and wares, but most importantly, the invention of writing. The epic depicts the transition of the ancient Bicolanos from the hunting stage to the agricultural stage, from the nomadic state to the settled life.

The Ibalong teaches about courage, of how a simple act can bring about positive change. The heroes made use of this courage to lead the community out of chaos without any regard for self-glorification. This gives evidence of good leadership. All three heroes were foreigners and not pure inhabitants of the Ibalong. This poses an argument that the locals had to depend on foreign abilities and leadership before they were able to obtain progress.

Also portrayed in the epic is the concept of social class, of slaves and masters. However, this did not hinder the growth of the community because the classes respected each other.

The Ibalong stresses the humble accomplishments and peaceful pursuits of the early Bicolanos. It is unlikely that the ancient Bicolanos had worshiped idols. Nothing is mentioned about gods in the epic except perhaps in passing, Onos, the god of floodwaters.

Folk history or not, these pre-Hispanic legends enabled the Bicolanos of today to gain valuable insights into the past of their land and their ancestors.

The epic is celebrated through street performances and floats on Ibalong Festival in Legazpi City, Bicol region since 1991. This is celebrated in Legazpi City during the month of August. The Ibalong festival features the various characters from the epic while celebrating through song and dance. It is also performed in theaters like Tanghalang Pilipino's Ibalong the Musical by Rody Vera.

== Obstacles that the ancient Bikolnon encountered ==
1. The obstacle of the giant wild boar that foraged Baltog's linsa crop: Even as Baltog slew this wild boar in a celebrated combat episode in the epic, this still could have awakened his potential for the hunt, inducing him into becoming a part-time hunter himself.
2. The second obstacle was Oryol, who tried to keep Handyong from ridding the land of ferocious wild beasts.
3. The third obstacle took the form of natural catastrophes: the sweeping deluge, the violent and simultaneous eruption of three volcanoes, etc.
4. The fourth obstacle was the half-man and half-beast Rabot who led a lot, and by whose magic turned to stone all those who fought him.

== Characters ==
=== Protagonists ===
Many accomplishments and advances made by the ancient Bikols were credited to various characters mentioned in the epic.

- Baltog: Baltog was the first white man or tawong-lipod to come to Bicol. Born in India (although India is called "Boltavara" in the epic) to the brave clan of Lipod, he introduced agriculture to Bicol by planting linsa or apay, which was a characteristic of early Indian colonizers. He slew the Tandayag Boar in a bone-wracking combat.
- Bantong: Bantong was a brave and cunning young warrior who single-handedly killed the half-man and half-wild beast Rabot, although Handyong had given him 1,000 warriors to help him do it.
- Dinahong: Dinahong, meaning "wrapped with leaves", is the original Bicolano potter who was believed to have been an Agta (Negrito) or pygmy. He helped the people learn cooking, making pots called coron, stoves, earthen jars, and other kitchen utensils.
- Ginantong: Ginantong made the plow, harrow, and other farming tools.
- Hablom: Hablom, from the verb hablon meaning “to weave”, was the inventor of the first weaving loom and bobbins in the Bicol region, especially for weaving abaca clothes.
- Handyong: The central figure in the epic is Handyong. He came to Bicol with his followers after Baltog, and came to be the most famous of the tawong-lipod. He cleared the land of predatory monsters, inspired inventions, reintroduced agriculture, built tree-houses where anitos or idols were kept called moog, and set up a code of laws, establishing a golden age in his day. He is also known to have built the first boat and developed rice cultivation in flooded areas.
- Kimantong: Kimantong is attributed to have been the first Bicolano to fashion the rudder called timon, the sail called layag, the plow called arado, the harrow called surod, the ganta and other measures, the roller, the yoke, the bolo, and the hoe. A baranggay called Kimantong is found in Daraga, Albay.
- Sural: Sural, or surat, meaning “to write” or “letter” was the first Bicolano to have thought of a syllabary. He carved it on a white rock-slab from Libong, which Gapon later polished.
- Takay: Takay was a lovely maiden who, according to legend, drowned during the great flood in the epic. Takay is believed to have become the water hyacinth in what is now Lake Bato.

=== Beasts ===
- Wild carabaos: Wild carabaos were not yet domesticated for farm work back then. They freely roamed the mountains in the early days. Handyong was able to domesticate the big-bodied beasts "in a short while".
- Giant crocodile: Also called buaya, Handyong defeated the giant crocodiles in combat. Handyong was assisted by Oryol in killing many of them, which lead tinged the Bicol River red with blood. The survivors were banished, along with Sarimao, to Mount Kulasi.

=== Monsters ===
Long before Spaniards arrived in Bicol and introduced Christianity, the Bicolanos already believed in gods and supernatural beings. The epic-fragment contains many of the supernatural faith and religion that the ancient Bicols had, among them are supernatural creatures.

- Angongolood: The Angongolood lurked along shadowy riversides. They were hideous apes that transformed their victims into trees surprising them in a tight embrace.
- Buring: The Buring was a one-eyed, three-throated creature which inhabited the swampy wastes of Ponong.
- Dagatnong settlement: In the epic, the Dagatnong settlement was said to have been swept away by the Great Flood. The people of Dagatnong were black pygmies who swelt on seacoasts, opposite of the Agta who lived in the highlands. The Dagatnong originally came from Kotmong.
- Moog: Moog are treehouses where the ancient Bikolnon lived and kept anitos and other idols.
- Rabot: Rabot was a ferocious half-human half-monster that could turn people into the rock by magic. Rabot is described as ugly, a liar, and had a loud voice. Bantong slew the monster using his bolo.
- Sarimao: The sarimao were avenging monsters that were brutally fierce, ugly, and ruinous. They went after evildoers, usually to those with hidden guilt, who could not be brought to justice. Handyong exiled the Sarimao to Mount Kulasi. Their human equivalents are believed to be those who take the law into their own hands, who have suffered injustice.
- Serpents: The serpents were probably related to Oryol, a serpent with a beautiful voice and could change its image to deceive enemies. Handyong sealed all the serpents inside a huge cave in Mount Hantik.
- Tandayag boar: The word tandayag means “giant”, meaning that it could be any living being that had grown very old and enormous. In the epic, Tandayag was the boar slew by Baltog.
- Tiburon: The tiburon were giant flying fishes which had slimy, scaly, and hardy flesh and saw-like teeth that could crush rocks. Handiong and his men did not stop until they vanquished every tiburon.
- Winged sharks: The winged sharks mentioned were not really winged sharks but rather manta rays that would sometimes pop out of the water like flying bats. These monsters were soon restrained by Handyong to keep waters safe for his followers.

== Difference from other Philippine epics ==
The differences of the Ibalong from other Philippine epics may suggest culture differences of the Ancient Bicols from other ancient groups.

1. The Ibalong suggests moral wholesomeness. There is no violence against another human being. The struggle of the ancient Bikolano's were primarily between people and the forces of nature. Sex was not played up in the Ibalong, unlike the usual run of many folk epics.
2. The epic stresses humble accomplishments and peaceful pursuits of the early Bicolanos: the cultivation of upland and lowland crops, the construction of dwellings on treetops, the hollowing-out of a tree trunk to make the first boat in the region, the crafting of tools, utensils, wares, the implementation of just laws, and the invention of writing.
3. The Ibalong is close to authenticity. The Ibalong contains Bicolano names of old places and landmarks that still exist.
4. The Ibalong suggests the working harmony of opposites. An example of this is the conflict between Oryol and Handyong, who ended up helping each other rid the land of predatory monsters.

== See also ==
- Ibalong (settlement)
- Philippine epic poetry
  - Darangen, Maranao adaptation of the Ramayana
  - Philippine literature
- Ramayana
  - Versions of the Ramayana
