= Filipino proverbs =

Filipino proverbs or Philippine proverbs are traditional sayings or maxims used by Filipinos based on local culture, wisdom, and philosophies from Filipino life. The word Sawikain proverb corresponds to the Tagalog words salawikain, kasabihan (saying) and sawikain (although the latter may also refer to mottos or idioms), and to the Ilocano word sarsarita. Proverbs originating from the Philippines are described as forceful and poetic expressions and basic forms of euphemisms. If used in everyday conversations, proverbs are utilized to emphasize a point or a thought of reasoning: the Filipino philosophy. One notable and locally popular example of a Filipino proverb is this: A person who does not remember where he (she) came from will never reach his (her) destination. Of Tagalog origin, it conveys and urges one person to give "importance in looking back at one’s roots and origins." The maxim also exemplifies a Filipino value known as the "utang na loob", one’s "debt of gratitude" to the persons who have contributed to an individual’s success. Damiana L. Eugenio, a professor from the University of the Philippines, author of Philippine Proverb Lore (1975), and who is also referred to as the "Mother of Philippine Folklore" grouped Filipino proverbs into six categories based on the topic expressed, namely: ethical proverbs (those that express a general attitude towards life and the laws that govern life itself), proverbs that recommend virtues and condemn vices, proverbs that express a system of values, proverbs that express general truths and observations about life and human nature, humorous proverbs, and miscellaneous proverbs.

== Usage ==
Philippine proverbs are further illustrated to be ornaments to language, words of ancestors handed down from one generation to another, and as wisdom gained from experience, which can be quoted to express a sentiment, a statement, or an opinion. Apart from this, Filipino proverbs are also used to avoid offending other individuals. This is one example of such a proverb: Bato-bato sa langit, 'pag tinamaan huwag magagalit, meaning "a stone thrown heavenward; if you get hit on its way down, don't get mad." Equipped with the appropriate and timely proverb, a Filipino can communicate empathy, and might be able to convince another person leading to the closure of an argument. Some Filipino proverbs are also intended to provide a warning, a lecture, advice, and as a supporting statement for a particular viewpoint or issue.
