= Jose Castaño =

Franciscan friar (1854–?)

Jose Castaño (born December 28, 1854 – ?) was a Franciscan friar born in Hiniesta in the Province of Zamora, Spain. He took his vows as a Franciscan priest on May 2, 1874 and was sent to Manila on June 22, 1875.

Briefly, he became an administrator in Camalig, Albay in the Philippines and in 1878, became a minister in the town of Lupi in Libmanan and afterwards in Ligaw. He spent 17 years in Bicol. Afterwards, he went back to Spain and became rector of the Colegio de Misiones de Almagro in Burgos.

In Spain, he was asked to submit contributions to the Archivo del Bibliofilo Filipino, whose editor was Wenceslao Retana. Most notable of his contributions was a cultural monograph titled Breve Noticias acerca del origin, religion, creencias y supersticiones de los antiguos Indios del Bicol, on the beliefs, superstitions and myths of the ancient Bicols.

At the end of his monograph, he added a 60-stanza epic story written in Spanish detailing the adventures of native heroes Handyong, Baltog and Bantong and how they tamed the wilderness of the Bicol plains fighting monsters and the wily enchantress Oryol, and how civilization slowly took root among the people.

Castaño briefly mentioned that he came across this epic being sung by a bard in his native tongue and he translated into Spanish.

Because this epic story was part of his contribution, it was believed the translation was written by him, but some researchers give credence to the idea that it was written by Fray Bernardino Melendreras and Castaño simply lifted the epic from the latter's work titled Ibal, as claimed by Merito Espinas, an anthropologist who wrote a book on the so-called Ibalon epic. No known copy had yet been seen of Melendreras' "Ibal" although, according to Espinas, a certain Valentin Marin y Morales clearly stated that "La poesia que trae el Jose Castaño en su obrita publicada por Retana en 1985 esta tomada de Ibal del P. Melendreras." This view, however, was not adhered to by another writer, {{ILL}Jose Calleja Reyes|bcl}}, who in his book, Bikol Maharlika, claimed that Marin's statement was hearsay.
