= Hudhud ni Aliguyon =

Epic from the Ifugao province in the Philippines

- Author: Anonymous (Oral Tradition)
- Language: Ifugao
- Genre: Epic poetry
- Published: Oral tradition
- Publication place: Philippines
- Pages: N/A
- Awards: International Arirang Prize by the Republic of Korea (2001); Masterpieces of the Oral and Intangible Heritage of Humanity by UNESCO (2001); Natural Cultural Treasure (2001) by the National Museum of the Philippines

Hudhud ni Aliguyon is an epic originating from the province of Ifugao, located in the Philippines. It chronicles the heroic exploits of a figure named Aliguyon. The epic is performed during harvesting season.

== Origin ==
Though the precise time when alim and the hudhud started to be chanted is not known, according to research the hudhud likely originated before the 7th century CE. A study by a scholar of the hudhud indicates that this might have pre-dated the construction of the rice terraces. The earliest dated terraces are found in Bunghalian municipality with a Carbon-14 determination of 610 AD., although the earliest human occupation of the municipality of Banaue is between 1545 and 825 BC. Both forms are virtual anthropological documents that orally record through time the changes that took place in Ifugao social organization, structure, and tradition. The infusion of modern elements in the text indicates the relative time of change. For instance, the mention of a gun in one of the stories suggests an influence that could only have come from the West, although the fact that the gun caused the conflagration of an entire village to indicate the idea of a gun was still a bit confused and was therefore still something novel.

== Use ==
In general, the Hudhud of the Ifugao is chanted only on four occasions—harvesting of rice, weeding of rice, funeral wakes, and bone-washing rituals. Hudhud ni Aliguyon is specifically included in the genre called Hudhud di Page or Hudhud di Ani, meaning Hudhud for Harvest in the Fields.

Typically, the rendition of this chant finds expression through a female ensemble, presided over by a soloist, often a proficient vocalist who may have assumed the role voluntarily. The ensemble comprises approximately ten to twelve women, forming the chorus. It is noteworthy that the entire chant need not be committed to memory by the chorus members.

The lead singer, referred to as the "munhaw-e," initiates the performance by articulating the title of the chant. Subsequently, the assembled group, known as the "mun-hudhud" or "mun-abbuy," becomes actively engaged in the recitation. This involvement transpires upon the invocation of cue words strategically incorporated into the chant. These cue words serve to introduce elements such as character names, village references, geographical features, and familial connections within the narrative.

== Structure: chants & episodes ==
The Hudhud comprises more than 200 chants, with each divided into 40 episodes. A complete recitation may last three to four days. The language of the stories abounds in figurative expressions and repetitions and employs metonymy, metaphor and onomatopoeia.

== Plot summary ==
In the village of Hannanga, a notable figure by the name of Aliguyon emerged. Born as the son of the village leader, Amtalao, and his spouse Dumulao, Aliguyon showed intelligence from a young age. Notably, Aliguyon acquired proficiency in combat techniques and was familiarized with magical spells and chants.

In his adolescence, he started a conflict with the adversary of his father, Pangaiwan, who was the leader of the neighboring village of Daligdigan. Pangaiwan avoided direct combat and instead delegated it to his son, Pumbakhayon, who had rivaling warfare skills with Aliguyon.

The battle continued as Aliguyon threw a spear towards Pumbakhayon, and he dodged it, retaliating by returning the spear towards Aliguyon. This exchange continued uninterrupted as the two alternately hurled spears at each another for three years.

As the two men grew to respect each other while fighting, Aliguyon and Pumbakhayon stopped hostilities and brokered a peace treaty for their villages. Aliguyon and Pumbakhayon eventually became friends and Aliguyon married Bugan, Pumbakhayon's younger sister and Pumbakhayon married Aliguyon's sister, Aginaya.

== Characters ==
Hudhud ni Aliguyon Characters
Hometown	Character	Description	Abilities
Hannanga	Aliguyon	Greatest warrior of Hannanga	Aliguyon possessed the ability to travel to faraway places without resting, eating or sleeping. He moved so fast that he could catch any weapon thrown at him, and he was never defeated in battle.
Hannanga	Amtalao	Leader of Hannanga; Father of Aliguyon; Enemy of Pangaiwan	
Hannanga	Dumulao	Mother of Aliguyon	
Hannanga	Aginaya	Sister of Aliguyon; Wife of Pumbakhayon	
Daligdigan	Pumbakhayon	Greatest warrior of Daligdigan	
Daligdigan	Pangaiwan	Leader of Daligdigan; Father of Pumbakhayon; Enemy of Amtalao	
Daligdigan	Dangunay	Mother of Pumbakhayon	
Daligdigan	Bugan	Sister of Pumbakhayon; Wife of Aliguyon	

== Notable themes ==
=== Exchange marriage ===
Hudhud ni Aliguyon, like some hudhuds, tackles the matrimonial aspects of the characters. An episode narrates that after a long fight between the two men, who are unable to defeat each other, the conflict was permanently resolved through exchange marriage among the families of the two warring protagonists. After gaining respect for each other's warring skills, the story ends with the hero's marriage of his former enemy's sister, and in exchange, the hero's sister is married to the hero's former enemy. Hudhud stories usually depict that the parents have only two children, a male and a female. The two men, after the fight, exchange sisters with a marriage alliance, such that a pair of brother and sister cross-marry to another pair of sister and brother who were unrelated to the first pair prior to the marriage.

This epic focuses on peacemaking and a heroic tradition where no blood is spilt. The celebration of the exchange marriage is a representation of the elimination of enmity, meaning that the next generation will no longer have these enemies.

=== Family solidarity ===
Family solidarity is also a theme expressed in the hudhud. The hudhud would start with a conflict of the fathers which will eventually be carried on to the children. The children have to avenge and continue to fight any enemy or outsider who made offences against the family.

=== Respect for parents and elders and prominence for women ===
Parents and elders were addressed properly, using terms such as Aman for father and Innan hi for mother. Also, the hero's mother specifically is given respect and prominence. It is evident in one part of the epic as the mother called to stop the fight between the two characters saying that Pumbakhayon must eat first.

== Values of the Hudhud and importance ==
Values are the ideas and beliefs that matter to people. They are deep-rooted motivations of behaviour and attitude. They define what is important and become the basis of choices, decisions, and reactions. The DECS Values Education Framework pronounced that “values help an individual realize himself as a person in the community responsible for his growth as well as for that of his fellow human being and the development of society.”

The Ifugao literature is rich in values as reflected in their songs, narratives, chants, and folktales. Using the DECS Revised Values Education Framework, a total of 896 values were found reflected in Hudhud ni Aliguyon, Hudhud ni Aliguyon and Bugan, and Hudhud ni Aliguyon and Dinoy-again. More specifically, there were 289 values reflected in Hudhud ni Aliguyon. These findings show that the Hudhud are rich in values reflective of the values of the Ifugaos.

There were 7 core values utilized in the study:

Core Values Found in the Hudhud
Aspect	Values	Values Found
Social	Social Responsibility	214
Moral	Love	194
Physical	Health Harmony with Nature	166
Political	Nationalism Patriotism	146
Economic	Economic Self-Sufficiency	106
Intellectual	Knowledge Truth	47
Spiritual	Spirituality	23

The results of the core values as shown in the table strongly signifies that the Ifugaos are socially responsible in all aspects. This social responsibility connotes mutual love and respect, fidelity, responsible parenthood, concern for others, social justice, freedom, and equality. Ifugaos also have high regard for living. The predominant theme of the Hudhud stories is exemplifying romances praising Ifugao ideals of love, marriage and wealth.

== Awards and recognitions ==
- International Arirang Prize by the Republic of Korea (2001)
- Masterpieces of the Oral and Intangible Heritage of Humanity by UNESCO (2001)
- Natural Cultural Treasure (2001) by the National Museum of the Philippines

== See also ==
- Philippine mythology

== Bibliography ==
- Lambrecht, Francis. Hudhud. 2005. NCCA-IHC.
- Picache, Cecilia V., 2009. Country Report on the Intangible Cultural Heritage Safeguarding Activities in Asia and the Pacific 2009.
- Peralta, Jesus T., 2007. The Philippines: on Safeguarding Intangible Cultural Heritage.
- Status Report on the Intangible Cultural Heritage Safeguarding in the Philippines. 2011.
- Terminal Report on the Safeguarding and Transmission of the Hudhud Chants of the Ifugao. 2008.
