= Biag ni Lam-ang =

Philippine epic poem

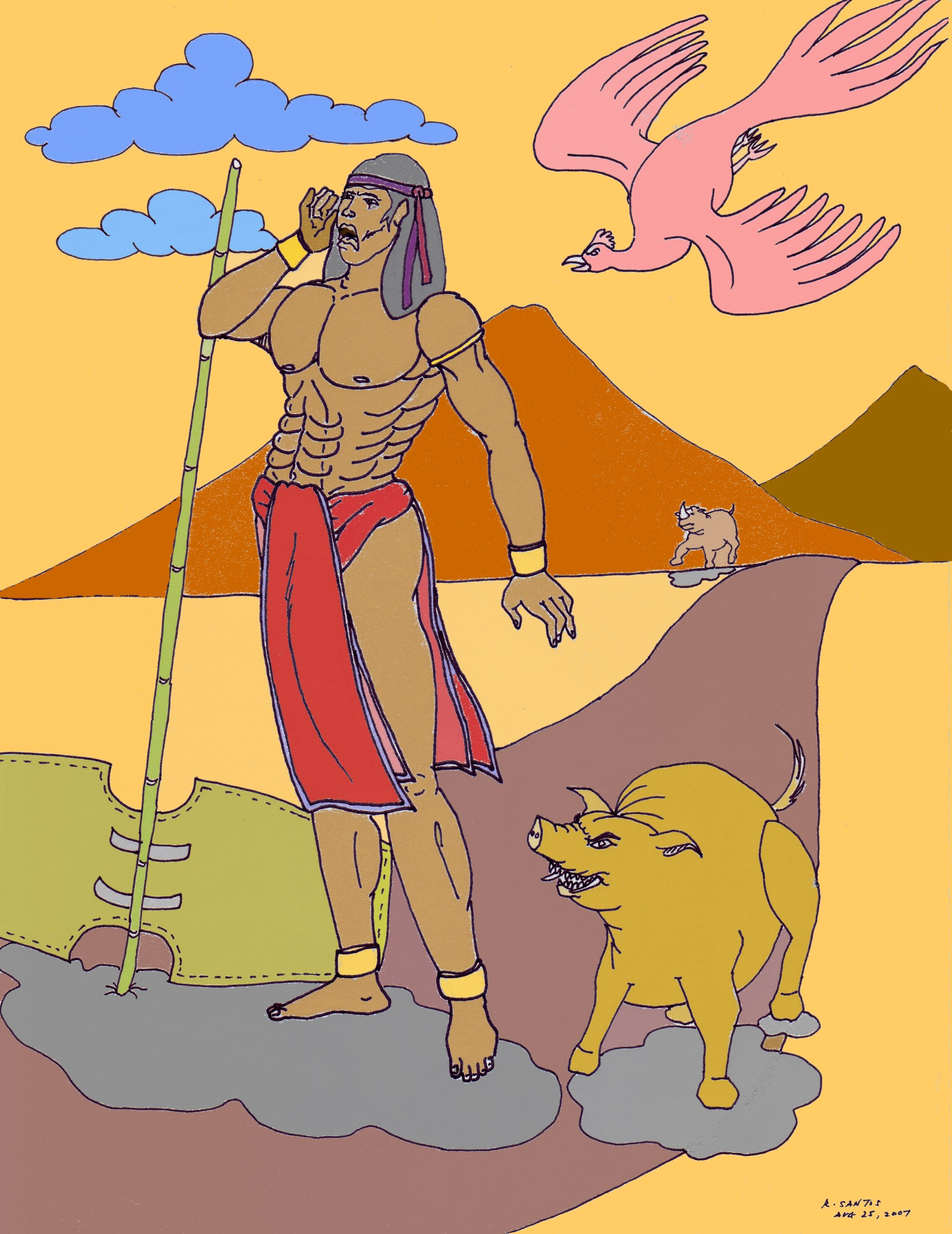
- An illustration depicting the protagonist Lam-ang
- Country: Philippines (Ilocos)

Biag ni Lam-ang (lit. 'The Life of Lam-ang') is an epic story of the Ilocano people from the Ilocos region of the Philippines. It is notable for being the first Philippine folk epic to be recorded in written form, and was one of only two folk epics documented during the Philippines' Spanish Colonial period, along with the Bicolano epic of Handiong. It is also noted for being a folk epic from a "Christianized" lowland people group (the Ilocano people), with elements incorporated into the storytelling.

As oral literature, the poem is believed to have originated in pre-colonial times, evolving as it is passed on from poet to poet and generation to generation. The poem's first transcription is sometimes attributed to the blind Ilocano poet-preacher Pedro Bucaneg, but historian E. Arsenio Manuel instead attributes its first written documentation to Fr. Blanco of Narvacan, working with the publicist and folklorist Isabelo de los Reyes.

== Historiography ==
As oral literature, the poem is believed to have originated in pre-colonial times, evolving as it is passed on from poet to poet and generation to generation.

Pedro Bucaneg, who supposedly dictated it so that it could be written down. However, it is unclear whether this "transcription" refers to an extant copy of the Biag ni Lam-ang text. Some texts, such as Celedonio Aguilar's Readings in Philippine Literature even state that this transcription occurred in 1640—long after Bukaneg is believed to have died.

Instead, historian E. Arsenio Manuel attributes the first written documentation of Biag Ni Lam-ang to the parish priest of the municipality Narvacan Fr. Gerardo Blanco and to publicist and folklorist Isabelo de los Reyes. It was Fr. Blanco who sent the text of the poem to De Los Reyes, who then published the text, in Ilocano, along with a Spanish prose translation, in his paper, the El Ilocano, 1889 to 1890.

== Narrative ==
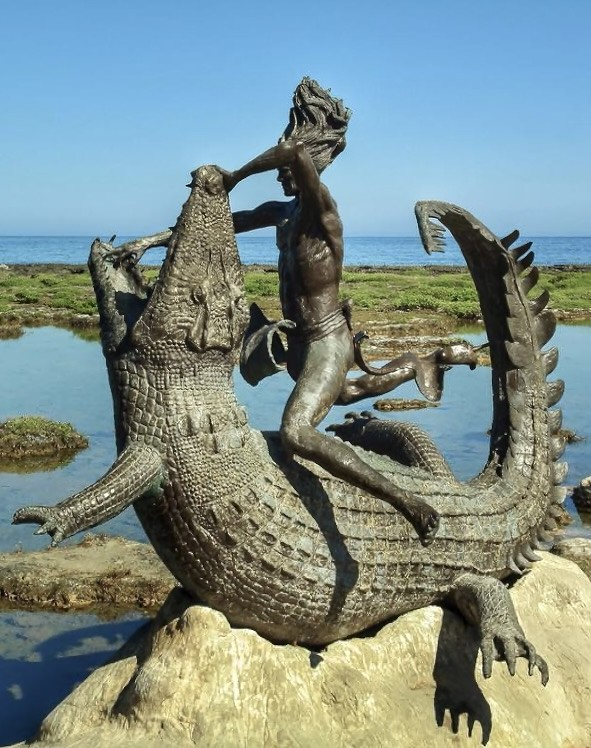
A bronze statue of Lam-ang fighting a giant crocodile in Ilocos Norte, Philippines

=== Literary structure ===
- Prologue: The Birth of Lam-ang (lines 5–108)
- Quest for the Father (lines 109–370)
  - Preparation (lines 109–192)
  - Obstacle: Burican (lines 193–261)
  - Triumph (lines 262–315)
  - Return to the Home (lines 315–370)
- Quest for the Wife (lines 455–1300)
  - Preparation (lines 455–586)
  - Obstacles: Sumarang and Saridandan (lines 587–724)
  - Wedding Banquet (lines 725–1286)
  - Return to the Home (lines 725–1286)
- Epilogue: The Death and Restoration of the Hero (lines 1301–1477)

=== Lam-ang's extraordinary birth ===
Lam-ang is an extraordinary being, when he was born, he was already able to speak, thus enabling him to choose his own name and told people to be called by this name.

=== The quest for Lam-Ang's father ===
His adventures begun when his father, Don Juan, set out for a battle but never returned. Barely nine months, Lam-ang goes to search for Don Juan in the highlands where the latter was said to have gone. Aware that her child was a blessed, exceptional creature, his mother Namongan allowed him to go. Lam-ang then went off in search of his father, leaving his grieving mother behind.

He saw his father beheaded and the head put on a spike. While the headhunters were celebrating, in his anger, he challenged all of them to a duel. The headhunters threw spears at him, but he just caught them and threw them back to the headhunters. He defeated the headhunters, killed them all and took his father's head down to the plains.

After he went down the plains, he decided to bathe in the Amburayan River, where the local women helped him bathe. The dirt was so gross that fishes and animals died upon contact of his bathwater.

=== The pursuit of Ines Kannoyan ===
Upon arriving home, Lam-ang decides to court his love interest, Ines Kannoyan who lives in Calanutian (Kanluit). Despite his mother's disapproval, he still follows his heart and set off again on another journey to his love. He faces one of Ines’ suitors and various monsters, but again is able to vanquish them with ease. Aiding him are his magical pets, a dog, and a rooster. The rooster flaps its wings and a house toppled over. This feat amazes everyone present, especially Ines. Then, Lam-ang’s dog barks and the house rose up. Invited to lunch with the family of Ines, Lam-ang impresses her parents with his wealth and upon returning, he gives the family two golden ships.

=== Lam-ang's death and magical resurrection ===
After his death due to being eaten by a huge fish, Lam-ang's bones are recovered and he is resurrected with the help of his magical pets. Ines is ordered by the rooster to wrap the bones with her tapis while the hen flapped its wings and the dog growled. In an instant, Lam-ang is happily reunited with his wife.

== Notable themes and storytelling elements ==
=== Comedic elements ===
Biag ni Lam-ang, though dominated by action and tragedy, nonetheless contained some comedic points. A prominent example is the scene in which Lam-ang was on his way home. He passes by the Amburayan River (identified by some as the biggest river in Ilocos) and decides to bathe. The dirt and blood that fell from his body then causes the death of the river's fish, crabs, and shrimp. As he is bathing, some maidens who were present at the river gladly attend to him.

=== Roman Catholic elements ===
The tale of Lam-ang, as a story passed on for generations as oral literature and recorded well into the Spanish colonial period, is notable for incorporating Roman Catholic elements into the story, such as references by the characters of Lam-ang and Ines Kannoyan to marriage as a sacrament. Folklorist Mellie Leandicho Lopez notes that "later versions of the epic differ from the early texts due to the addition of more Christian and Spanish elements in the adventures of the Culture hero Lam-Ang."

=== Influences from Hindu epics ===
Although most of the thematic scholarship regarding the Biag ni Lam-ang have focused on the evolving Roman Catholic influences on the epic, some Philippine textbooks have suggested that it may have been influenced by the Mahabharata and the Ramayana.

Philippine anthropologists and historiographers such as F. Landa Jocano suggest that such Hindu influences probably arrived in the Philippines through the extensive trade that local cultures had with the Majapahit Empire during the 14th through 16th centuries, although earlier scholars such as Juan R. Francisco and Josephine Acosta Pasricha had suggested earlier dates for this influence, during the ninth to the tenth century AD.

== Adaptations ==
In 1979, cartoonist Nonoy Marcelo adapted the story into the 60-minute animated feature of the same name.

In 2012, a film adaptation called Lam-Ang was attempted to be produced, starring Rocco Nacino as Lam-ang and Rochelle Pangilinan. Originally intended to be a TV series, it was later decided to be turned it into a film directed by Ana Agabin. However, by late 2012, the film's production was indefinitely put on hold.

In 2018, Biag ni Lam-Ang was illustrated as a single-panel narrative by Jill Arwen Posadas for the Ang Ilustrador ng Kabataan exhibition, Enchantment.

In 2021, episode 3 of the revival of Legends of the Hidden Temple told the story of Lam-Ang and based its challenges off of different parts of that legend.

== See also ==
- Philippine mythology
- Philippine literature
- Pedro Bucaneg
- Philippine epic poetry
- Darangen, a Maranao epic poem
