= Ibalon =

Settlement in the Philippines

Ibalong
- Interactive map of Ibalong
- 12°50′N 123°51′E
- Type: Settlement
- Location: Magallanes, Sorsogon, Philippines

Ibalon, or Ibalong, is the ancient name of the Bicol Region in the Philippines. The center of settlement is believed to be in Magallanes, Sorsogon, Philippines, renowned as one of the first Spanish settlements on the island of Luzon. At some point, the name Ibalong was also used by the Spanish to refer to the entire Bicol Peninsula and, to some extent the entire island of Luzon.

At present, the Ibalong Epic, is celebrated by Legazpi in Albay. The Ibalong Festival celebrates the epic story of the Kingdom of Ibalong with three legendary heroes, namely Baltog, Handyong, Bantong and other ancient heroes. People parade in the streets wearing masks and costumes to imitate the appearance of the heroes and the villains, portraying the classic battles that made their way into the history of Bicol. The Ibalong Festival aims to express warmth and goodwill to all people; visitors and tourists are encouraged to celebrate with the Bicolanos.

== Plot ==
A map of Ibalon (green) within the Bicol Region by 1567.

Ibalon is an epic narrative originating from the Bicol region of the Philippines. The tale unfolds in a land characterized by wide plains and fertile fields, known for its exceptional agricultural productivity. The narrative commences with the introduction of the first man, Baltog, who originally hailed from Botavara and belonged to the Lipod race. Baltog's life takes a significant turn when his prized "linsa" or gabi plants are destroyed by a formidable Tandayag boar. In his fervor to avenge this loss, Baltog engages in a relentless battle with the colossal boar, ultimately defeating it by breaking its massive jaws with his own formidable strength.

The arrival of Handiong, another prominent figure, brings further transformation to the land of Bikol. Handiong embarks on a mission to rid the region of menacing creatures, including one-eyed, three-throated beasts, winged sharks, wild carabaos, and man-eating crocodiles. His heroic efforts lead to the exile of the "sarimaw" to the mountain Kulasi and the burial of serpents in Hantik.

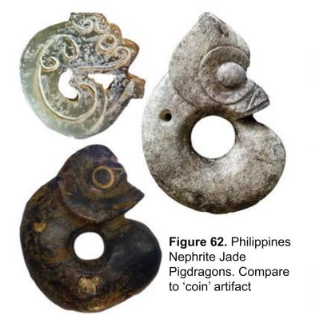
White Nephrite Jade Pig Dragons found in the Philippines. Both pigs and dragons are sacred in Austronesian culture, the former as a source of food and the latter as a font of spirituality.

A significant adversary in Handiong's journey is Oriol, a shape-shifting entity who challenges him with her seductive yet deceitful nature. Oriol proves to be elusive and presents a formidable challenge, sometimes aiding and other times obstructing Handiong's endeavors.

Handiong's triumph over the wild beasts results in the establishment of settled communities, marked by advancements such as boat-building, agriculture, and the creation of various tools and utensils. Laws are enacted to ensure equality and protect life and honor, fostering a sense of order and respect for heritage.

However, this burgeoning civilization faces a catastrophic setback with a great deluge caused by tempests, leading to volcanic eruptions, changes in land formations, and the devastation of the growing civilization. Notably, the land of Ibalon undergoes significant geographical transformations.

The narrative also highlights the deeds of Bantong, a young warrior who plays a crucial role in vanquishing Rabot, a fearsome half-man, half-beast monster. Bantong's clever strategy leads to the defeat of Rabot, and his triumphant return to Handiong's people is met with celebration.

"Ibalon" is a valuable literary work, consisting of 240 lines, offering insights into the cultural beliefs and heroic traditions of the ancient Bicolanos. It is one of the few epic narratives that originate from Christian Filipinos, alongside "Biag ni Lam-ang," with the majority of epics hailing from non-Christian indigenous groups.

Ibalon, also known as the Bicol Epic, is a legendary tale from the Bicol region of the Philippines, passed down through oral tradition. It tells the heroic adventures of Baltog, Handyong, and Bantong, who fought monsters and natural disasters to bring peace and civilization to Ibalon. The epic reflects the bravery and resilience of the pre-colonial Bicolano people, preserving their cultural heritage through generations.

== See also ==
- Bicol Region
- Ibalong Epic
- Ibalong Festival
