= Nueva Ecija High School =

Public high school in Nueva Ecija, Philippines

- Mataas na Paaralan ng Nueva Ecija (Filipino)

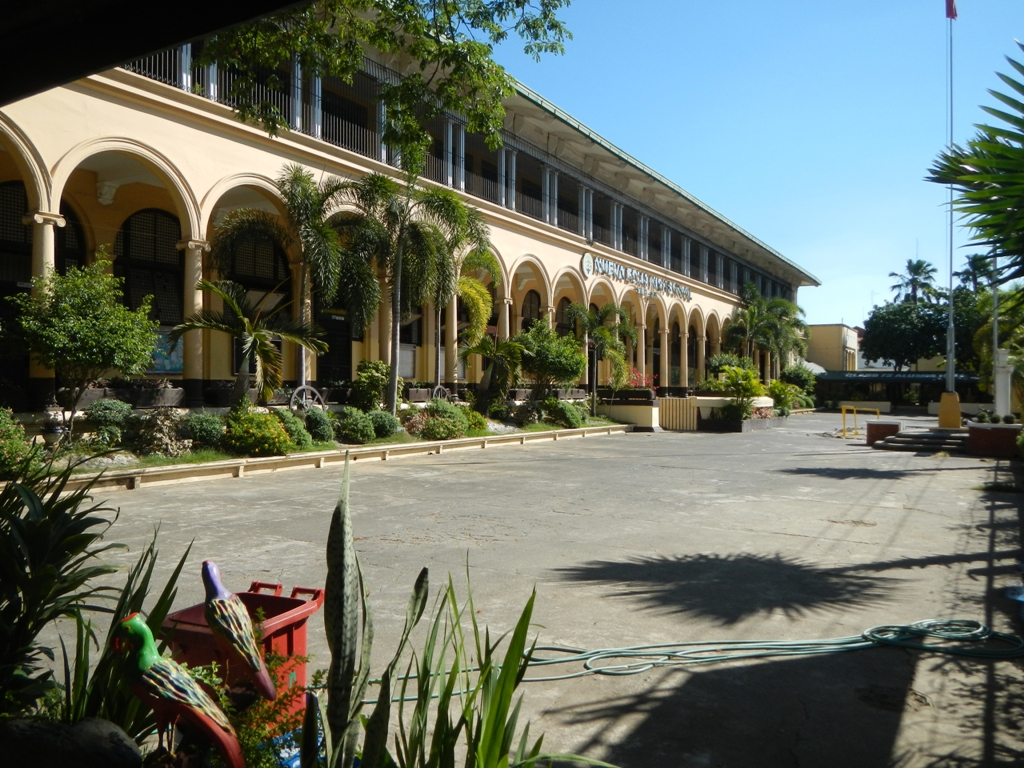

Location
- Burgos Avenue; Cabanatuan, Nueva Ecija; Philippines; 15°29′26″N 120°58′13″E

Information
- Type: Public Secondary School
- Motto: "If it is NEHS, it must be the BEST"
- Established: 1905
- Principal: Brent C. M
- Grades: 7 to 12
- Campus: Burgos St., Cabanatuan, Nueva Ecija, Philippines
- Colors: Yellow and Green
- Website: http://nehs.smartschools.ph

The Nueva Ecija High School or N.E.H.S. is a National High School located on Burgos Avenue in Cabanatuan, Nueva Ecija, Philippines. It is one of the oldest schools in Nueva Ecija.

== History ==
Since 1902, there have been many changes in the school. The municipal and provincial schools were then combined. In 1903, the big increase in enrollment necessitated the expansion of the school. Another expansion in 1904 was undertaken through a loan of 15,000.00 pesos from the Insular government and by the donation of the north of the present site by Crispulo Sideco known as Kapitang Pulong, of San Isidro, Nueva Ecija. In 1907, Eufemio Policarpio sold to the school at a nominal price, one hectare of land connected with that piece of land. Mr. Policarpio was later elected President (1917–1922) of the town.

The school expansion program was started in the later part of 1904 and was completed on October 7, 1905 at the cost of 19,000.00 pesos and was opened on the same month. Through Governor Epifanio de los Santos and Municipal President Florencio Miranda, the school was named “Wright Institute” in honor of Governor General Luke Edward Wright.

During the American regime, many reforms were introduced, including social, economic, and political innovations. It was then that the Wright Institute was established in San Isidro, the first public high school outside of Manila. This institute became the Nueva Ecija High School until its transfer to Cabanatuan in 1927. The building was for a time the municipal hall. The elementary classes were held at the old provincial capitol. An agreement was reached between the school officials and the municipal authorities for the exchange of buildings.

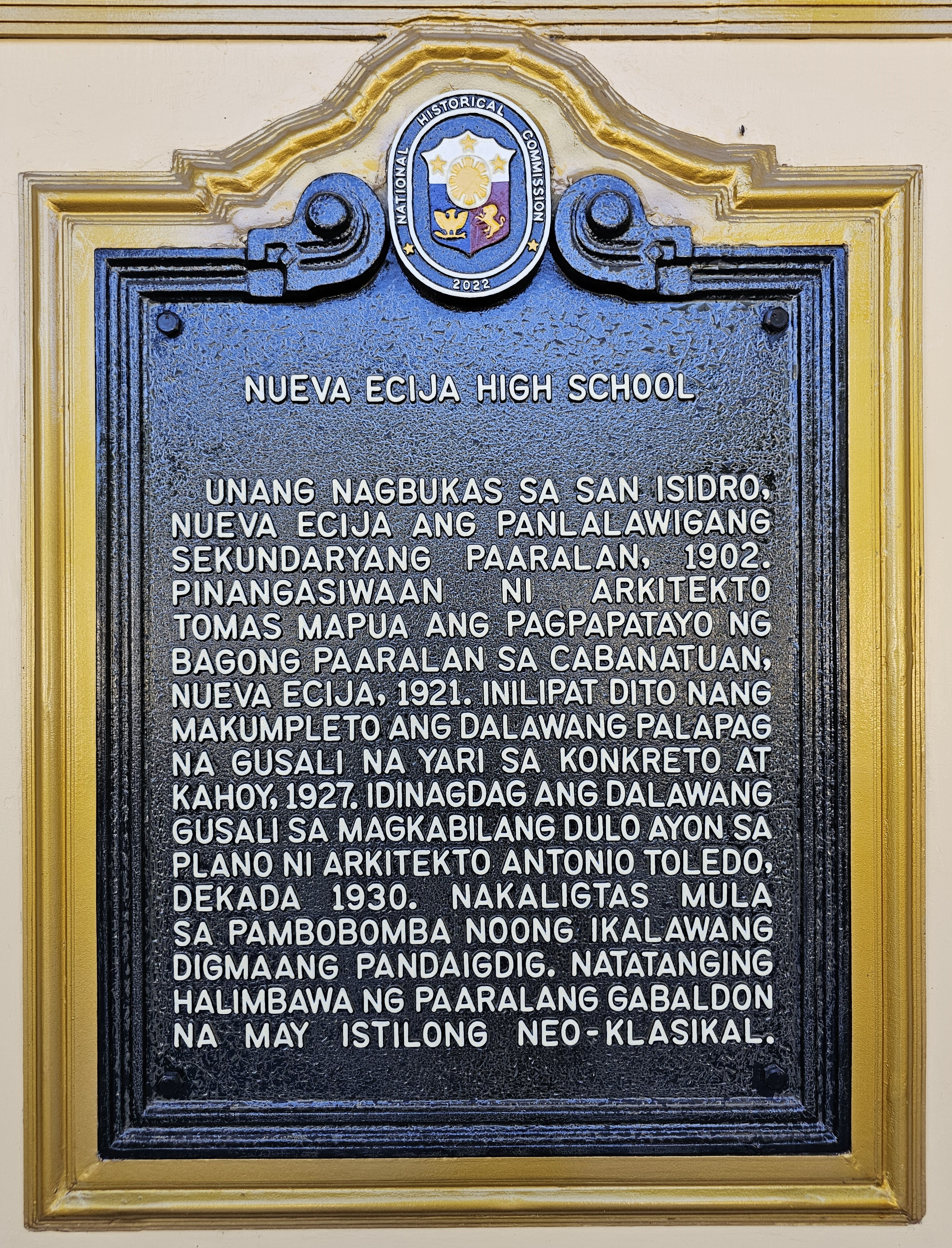
Historical marker installed by the National Historical Commission of the Philippines to commemorate the school.

The Nueva Ecija High School was then under the supervision of the School Division of San Fernando, Pampanga. Its memories lived through its alumni and students.

From 1901 to 1910, the supervision of the school was in the hands of Mr. T. W. Thompson, Division Superintendent of Schools based in San Fernando, Pampanga. Following him were Whipple, Coddington, Hitchcock, Whipple, Miller and Whipple.

Mr. Thompson came to the islands in 1901 on transport “Thomas” and was assigned as the Acting Division Superintendent of Nueva Ecija on September 1 of the same year. In May 1902, he was given regular appointment to the same position, in April 1907, he became Division Superintendent of Ilocos Sur and in October 1909, he was appointed Acting Superintendent of the Philippine Normal School.

Mr. Thompson was described as an official; earnest, capable, faithful, and efficient; and as a man, his genial temperament and exemplary character were such as to invite friendship, confidence and respect of all who knew him. Thompson died on December 20, 1910.

== Curriculum ==
NEHS offers the following curriculum:

- Science, Technology, and Engineering Curriculum (STE)
- Information and Communication Technology Curriculum
- Sports Curriculum
- Basic Education Curriculum
- Special Program for the Arts (S. P. A)
- Special Program for Foreign Language (SPFL)
