= Darangen =

Maranao epic poem from Mindanao, Philippines

- Country: Philippines
- Language: Maranao
- Genre(s): Epic poem
- Meter: Iambic tetrameter
- Lines: 72,000

Darangen epic of the Maranao people of Lake Lanao
- UNESCO Intangible Cultural Heritage
- Country: Philippines
- Reference: 00159
- Region: Asia and the Pacific

Inscription history
- Inscription: 2008 (3rd session)
- List: Representative

Darangen is a Maranao epic poem from the Lake Lanao region of Mindanao, Philippines. It consists of 17 cycles with 72,000 lines in iambic tetrameter or catalectic trochaic tetrameter. Each cycle pertains to a different self-contained story. The most notable of which deals with the exploits of the hero Bantugan.

In 2002, the Darangen was declared a National Cultural Treasure of the Philippines by the National Museum and a Provincial Treasure by the Lanao del Sur provincial government. The Darangen epic was also proclaimed as a Masterpiece of the Oral and Intangible Heritage of Humanity in 2005 by UNESCO (inscribed in 2008). It is the longest surviving epic poetry in the Philippines.

Darangen is meant to be narrated by singing or chanting. Select parts of it are performed by male and female singers during weddings and celebrations (traditionally at night time), usually accompanied by music from kulintang gong ensembles, Tambor drums, and kudyapi stringed instruments. It is also traditionally accompanied by several dances, each interpreting specific episodes of the epic. Depending on the part being performed, the performance can last a few hours to a week. The epic also incorporates Maranao customary laws, social values, and practices prior to the Maranao conversion to Islam in the 14th century.

== Etymology ==
The term Darangen literally means "that which is narrated by song or chant" in the Maranao language, from the verb darang ("to narrate in the form of songs or chants").

== Provenance ==
The Darangen was originally a purely oral tradition. Its importance was first recognized by Frank Charles Laubach, an American missionary and teacher then living in the Lanao Province. He first encountered it in February 1930 on a return trip to Lanao by boat after he had attended the Manila Carnival. He was accompanied by 35 Maranao leaders, two of them sang darangen (epics) of Bantugan for the two-day journey.

After hearing parts of the Darangen, Laubach was so impressed by the "sustained beauty and dignity" of the songs that he immediately contacted Maranao people who could recite various parts of it. He transcribed them phonetically by typewriter. His best source was the nobleman Panggaga Mohammad, who also helped Laubach transcribe the epics. Laubach described Mohammad as a man who "knew more Maranao songs than any other living man." Laubach published part of the Darangen in November 1930 in the journal Philippine Public Schools. This was the first time the oral epics have ever been recorded in print, and it was also the first instance of the Maranao language being published in the Latin script.

When you pass by the houses of the Maranaws at night, you can hear them singing folk songs or reciting poems that are beautiful and strange. Yet on account of the absence of a Maranaw writer, Maranaw literature has remained in the dark for other people. It has become something of a tale that other Filipino tribes hear only from visitors to Lanao

— Frank Charles Laubach,

Laubach's version, however, was incomplete. A more complete version was later compiled by modern scholars from the Folklore Division of the Mindanao State University Research Center (now called Mamitua Saber Institute of Research and Creation) under the sponsorship of the Toyota Foundation. They collected, transcribed, and translated various parts and versions of the Darangen from Maranao elders and from kirim (handwritten Maranao songbooks written in the Jawi alphabet) over a period of ten years. The entire epic was published from 1986 to 1988 in eight volumes, in both original Maranao and their English translations.

== Background ==
The Darangen does not have a single author, but is rather a collection of tales passed down orally from generation to generation. It has 72,000 lines divided into 17 cycles (also called books or episodes) in iambic tetrameter or catalectic trochaic tetrameter. Each of the cycles can be treated as an independent story, but they are all connected sequentially. The epic is also recorded in the archaic Maranao language, which differs significantly from the modern colloquial version of Maranao.

Darangen was memorized by their performers. Skilled chanters were known as onor. The epic was most commonly sung at night time, during weddings (kawing) and other celebrations. But it can also be used as a lullabye for children.

A full performance of the entire epic usually takes about a week. In modern times, however, it is more common to only perform parts of the epic, which usually lasts for a few hours. The chanting or singing is commonly accompanied by dances and musical performances using traditional Maranao instruments like kulintang gong ensembles, Tambor drums, and kudyapi stringed instruments.

The Darangen originates from before the conversion of the Maranao people to Islam, and thus details the traditional pre-Islamic anito religions of the Maranao. The heroes in the epic worship and interact with various ancestor and guardian spirits (tonong) and nature spirits (diwata). An example is Batara-sa-Marudo, (Note: Compare with Bathala) a nature spirit capable of bringing down floods and storms.

== Setting ==
The Darangen features several locales, but the principal setting is the grand city of Bembaran (also spelled Bumbaran or Bembran), (Note: The town of Bumbaran (modern Amai Manabilang) of Lanao del Sur was named after the mythical Bembaran in 1977) ruled by the main hero of the epic, Prince Bantugan. It was described as being near a great river. The city's name means "[the place of the] sunrise" (i.e. "east"), and was also known as Tangkal a Baaraantakan, with the same meaning. It is also sometimes referred to as Mimbalas, meaning "the place where a river cuts across". It supposedly does not exist anymore as it was enchanted and sank to the bottom of the sea. In the epic, Bembaran is described as being founded by Diwata Ndaw Gibbon, the grandfather of Prince Bantugan. Bembaran has a satellite city-state of Gadongan (literally "storehouse"), also known as Gadongan Pamaoy or Kodarangan a Lena ("petrified or enchanted yellow-green").

It also features the powerful city of Kadaraan sa Ndlaw (also known as Kadaraan Sandaw, Kadaraan, or Kadaan), literally "[the place of the] sunset" (i.e. "west"). They are the traditional enemies of Bembaran and the big battles in the Darangen are between them. They are described as attacking neighboring city-states via the sea, using their large fleet of ships. The rulers of Kadaraan and Bembaran are descendants of the same ancestor.

The epic also illuminates the inter-ethnic relationships of the Maranao people. They mention the Manobo, the mountain-dwellers, and the "Samar" (Sama-Bajau), the sea people, many times.

== Summary ==
- CYCLE 1: Paganay Kiyandató ("The First Ruler") - deals with the founding of the city (iliyan) of Bembaran by Diwata Ndaw Gibon (also spelled Diwatandao Gibon), a powerful hero born with the twin-spirit (tonong) Pinatolá a Tonong.
- CYCLE 2: Kambembaran ("The Story of Bembaran")
- CYCLE 3: Kapmadali ("The Story of Madali") - deals with the conquest of Danalima a Rogong by Prince Madali of Bembaran
- CYCLE 4: Kapaesandalan a Morog sa Iliyan a Bembaran ("The Story of Pasandalan a Morog in Iliyan a Bembaran")
- CYCLE 5:

- Kapagondoga ("The Story of Hurt Feelings")
- Kaplombayawan a Lena ("The Story of Lombayawan a Lena")

- CYCLE 6:

- Paramata Gandingan ("The Story of Paramata Gandingan") - deals with the courtship of Paramata Gandingan of Komara by Prince Bantugan of Bembaran
- Alongan Pisaeyanan ("The Story of Alongan Pisaeyanan")

- CYCLE 7:

- Kaplomna - also known as Kiyasugo a Ki Lomna
- Kormatan Borodan
- Minirigi a Rogong
- Kaploboway
- Kiyatidawa i Lomna go so Ikadaraan

- CYCLE 8: So Kiyaprawa'a Ko Lawanen ("The Abduction of Lawanen") - also known as Kapmabaning ("The Story of Mabaning")
- CYCLE 9:

- Saolaya'a
- Paramata Selegen

- CYCLE 10: Pangensayan a Rogong
- CYCLE 11: Bagombayan a Lena
- CYCLE 12: Taratakan a Oray
- CYCLE 13:

- Sandalinayan Sirig sa Minilalansay Lena
- Kangginaasan a Oray

- CYCLE 14: Kap Minango'aw a Rogong
- CYCLE 15:

- Kapmaginar
- Kapnataengkoban a Ragat

- CYCLE 16: Kaprinandang
- CYCLE 17: Kiyandató i Sayana sa Kormara

== Dances ==
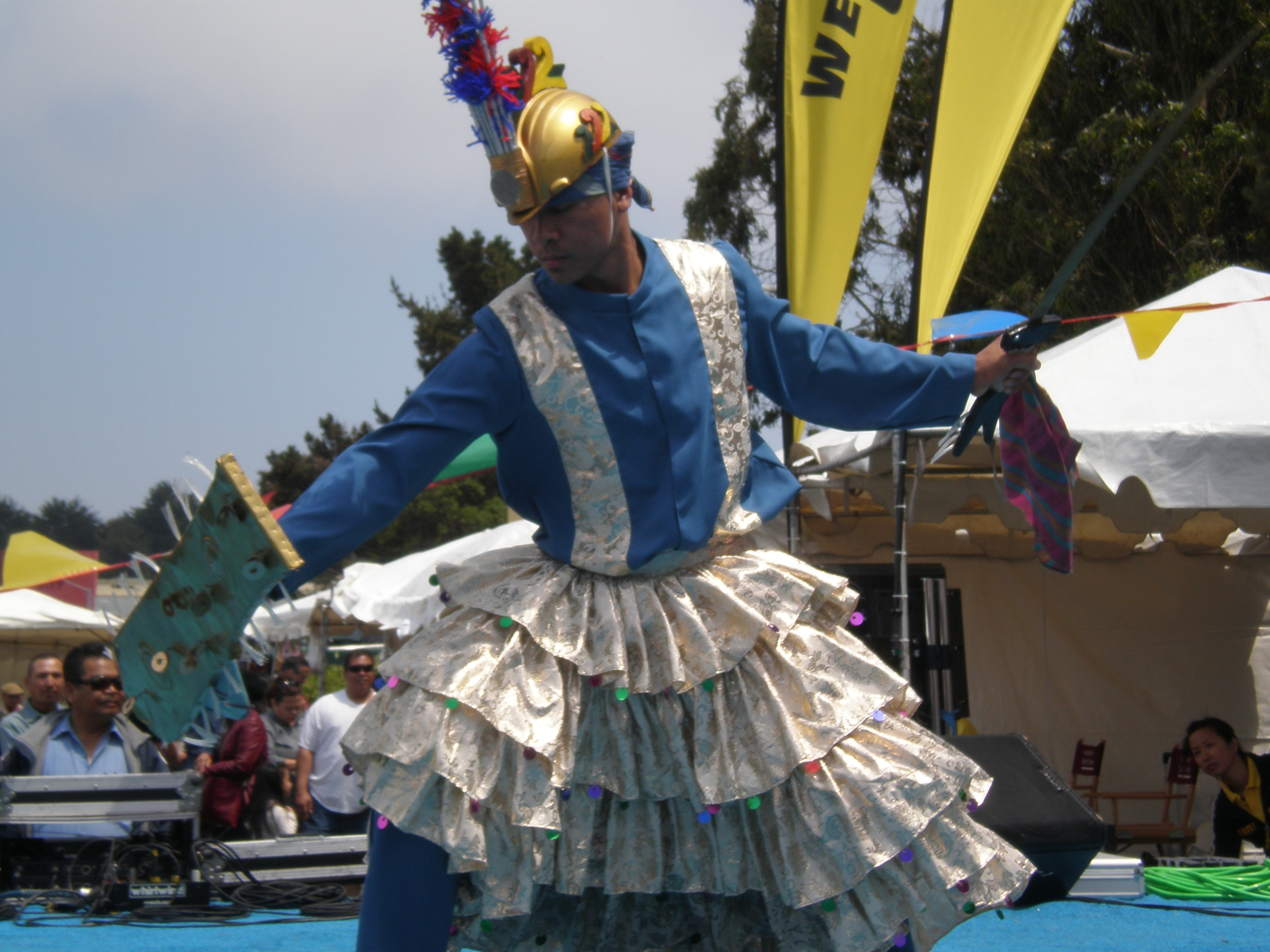
A man performing Sagayan at the 14th Annual Fil-Am Friendship Celebration at Daly City, California

Dances associated with the Darangen include the following:

- Kaganat sa Darangen - A dance illustrating the journey of Prince Lomna to Gindolongan, to propose marriage on his father's behalf. It means "To stand from the Darangen" and involves graceful movements of the fingers and hips with fans.
- Sagayan - A war dance reenacting Prince Bantugan's preparation for battle. Also known as Kasagyan.
- Singkil - A dance involving two pairs of clashing bamboos. The name of the dance derives from the ankle rings worn by the lead female dancer. It illustrates the abduction of Princess Gandingan and her rescue by Prince Bantugan. Also known as Kasingkil or Kasayaw sa Singkil.

== Modern adaptations ==
The Bantugan cycle of the Darangen has been adapted into the ballet performance Darangen ni Bantugan by the Philippine Ballet Theatre.

== Conservation ==
The conservation of the Darangen faces several challenges. Some modern Maranao Islamic religious leaders object to the non-Islamic themes of the Darangen. Some modern revisions have omitted mentions of the tonong and diwata entirely. Some older Darangen singers have refused to sing these versions as they are deemed inauthentic. The use of archaic Maranao in the Darangen also makes it less readily accessible to modern Maranao speakers, leading to decreasing interest among modern Maranao youth. Some versions are so old only the chanters can understand the words used. The number of people able to play instruments like the kulintang and kudyapi are also declining.

== See also ==
- Philippine epic poetry
- Maharadia Lawana
- Biag ni Lam-Ang
- Hinilawod
