= E. Arsenio Manuel =

Philippine academic, historian, and anthropologist

Esperidión Arsenio Manuel (1909 - 2003), known as E. Arsenio Manuel, was a Philippine academic, historian, and anthropologist best known for his contributions to Philippine anthropology, history, literature, and linguistics. During a three-decade academic career at the University of the Philippines, he wrote a seminal survey of Philippine folk epics, and was responsible for discovering and publishing folk epics from the Manuvu, Matigsalug, and Ilianon peoples.

He is sometimes referred to as the "Dean of Filipino Anthropology" and "Father of Philippine Folklore."

== Early life ==
Esperidión Arsenio Manuel was born on January 19, 1909, in Santo Domingo, Nueva Ecija, Philippine Islands. He later pursued higher education at the University of the Philippines and eventually earned a doctorate from the University of Chicago. Manuel would later become one of the pioneering figures in Philippine anthropology, folklore studies, and linguistics.

== Major awards ==
Among the most significant honors awarded to E. Arsenio Manuel were the Cultural Center of the Philippines' Gawad Para sa Sining in 1989; and the National Commission for Culture and the Arts' Dangal Alab ng Haraya Award for a lifetime achievement in cultural research, in 2000.

E. Arsenio Manuel was made a National Social Scientist of the Philippines in 1991.

== See also ==
- Isabelo de los Reyes
- Damiana Eugenio
- Gilda Cordero Fernando
