= Philippine folk literature =

Traditional Filipino oral literature

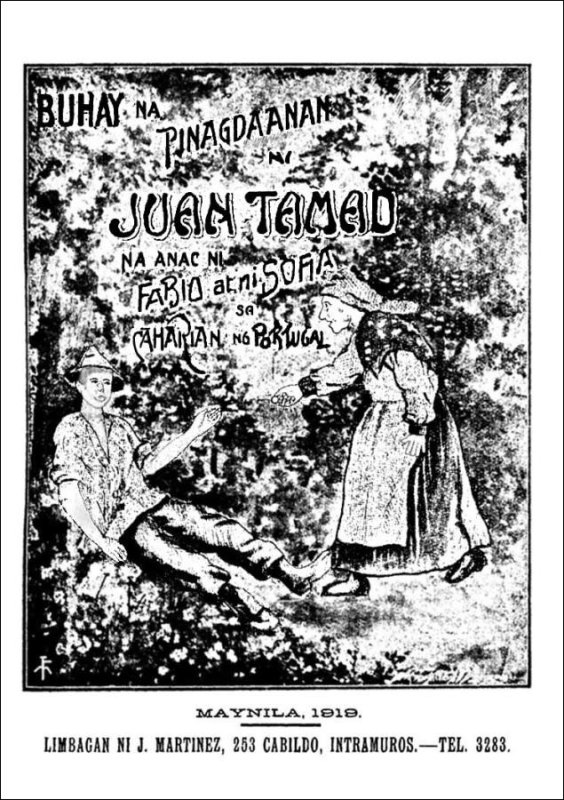
Juan Tamad ("Lazy John"), a best example of Philippine folklore published in 1919. It illustrates the main character's laziness to climb a guava tree and pick a bearing fruit.

Philippine folk literature refers to the traditional oral literature of the Filipino people. Thus, the scope of the field covers the ancient folk literature of the Philippines' various ethnic groups, as well as various pieces of folklore that have evolved since the Philippines became a single ethno-political unit.

While the difference between Philippine folk literature and Philippine mythology is a fine one, this article distinguishes folk literature as the source from which Philippine mythology derives.

It is a subset of Philippine folklore, a larger field which also includes other aspects of culture including folk beliefs, customary law, material culture, among others

== Proponents of Philippine literature ==
This aims to revive the Spanish language and its influence in Filipino writing. Another proponent of Philippine literature is Valeriano Hernandez Peña, the Father of the Tagalog Novel (Ama ng Nobelang Tagalog). He authored the Magkaibigang Nena at Neneng in 1905.

== Philippine folk literature in oral and print formats ==
While the oral, and thus changeable, aspect of folk literature is an important defining characteristic, much of this oral tradition has been written into a print format. To point out that folklore in a written form can still be considered folklore, Utley points out that folklore "may appear in print, but must not freeze into print." All the examples of folk literature cited in this article are taken from print, rather than oral sources.

== Categories ==
Eugenio classifies Philippine Folk Literature into three major groups: Folk narratives, folk speech, and folk songs. Folk narratives can either be in prose - the alamat (folklore), the legend, and the kuwentong bayan (folktale) - or in verse, as in the case of the folk narrative. Folk speech includes the bugtong (riddle) and the salawikain (proverbs). Folk songs can be sub-classified into those that tell a story (folk ballads), which are rare in Philippine folk literature, and those that do not, which form the bulk of the Philippines' rich heritage of folk songs.

== As an example of Southeast Asian folklore ==
Since it comes from a Southeast Asian nation, Philippine folk literature can be counted as a representative of Southeast Asian folklore. This is not a simple categorization, however, for two important reasons.

First, Southeast Asia as a distinct cultural region was not recognized until the political environment after the Second World War.

Second, even as the idea of a Southeast Asia was being conceived, the inclusion of the Philippines in the region was consistently in debate because of its very different cultural makeup.

Setting those two objections aside, Philippine folk literature would be considered a subset of the folklore of peninsular Southeast Asia, which includes the folklore of Malaysia, Indonesia, and Brunei. This would be distinct from the folk literature of continental Southeast Asia, which includes Vietnam, Thailand, Myanmar, Cambodia, and others. The distinction roots from the geographical influence on the cultures arising from these countries.

Like all of Southeast Asia, however, whether peninsular or continental, Philippine folk literature shows strong cultural influences from India.

A major difference however, arises from the colonial influences in the development of Southeast Asian folk literature. The Philippines' 300 years of Spanish rule sets it apart from other Southeast Asian nations.

== Continued evolution ==
While folklore is often associated with ancient times, newer recordings of Philippine folk literature have made in modern times. Quite aside from urban legends, modern legends attributing superhuman powers to powerful and charismatic leaders such as former presidents Ramon Magsaysay and Ferdinand Marcos have been documented and accepted as full-fledged examples of Philippine folk literature. In the case of Marcos, scholars have extensively documented methods by which propaganda methods were used to fashion a cult of personality designed to perpetuate Marcos' authoritarian rule, and to perpetuate Marcos myths to help his family return to political prominence in the Philippines after his death.

The popularity of Philippine Komiks in the mid-20th century, and its revival in the 21st century, has also brought about the reinterpretation of Philippine folk literature in graphic form, with the increasing popularity of artists such as Gerry Alanguilan, Arnold Arre, Budjette Tan, Kajo Baldisimo, and the rise of fan communities through comic book conventions such as komikon resulting in crossover success in other media, including feature films and streaming media.

== See also ==
- Philippine literature
- Philippine mythology
- Philippine mythical creatures
