= Gubat na Mapanglaw =

Fillpino Poem

"Gubat na Mapanglaw" (English: "The Dark Forest") is a Filipino poem written in the popular Filipino epic Florante at Laura. The poem was originally written by Francisco Balagtas and was translated into English by Rolando Tinio.
