= Balagtas (disambiguation) =

Francisco Balagtas (1788–1862) was a Filipino national poet.

Balagtas may also refer to:

- Balagtas, Bulacan, Philippine municipality
- Balagtas Church
- Balagtas station, Philippine railway station
- Balagtas, a barangay in Batangas City
- Balagtas (crater)
- Balagtas exit, of the Southern Tagalog Arterial Road
- Irving Reef, also known as Balagtas Reef
- Balagtasan, Filipino art form

== People with the surname ==
- Jose Balagtas, Filipino director
- Maricar Balagtas, Filipino model and beauty contestant
- Rogelio Balagtas, Filipino Canadian actor
- Fernando Malang Balagtas, supposed author of a disputed 16th century document
