= Orion, Bataan =

Municipality in Bataan, Philippines

Orion Udyong
- Municipality
- Municipality of Orion
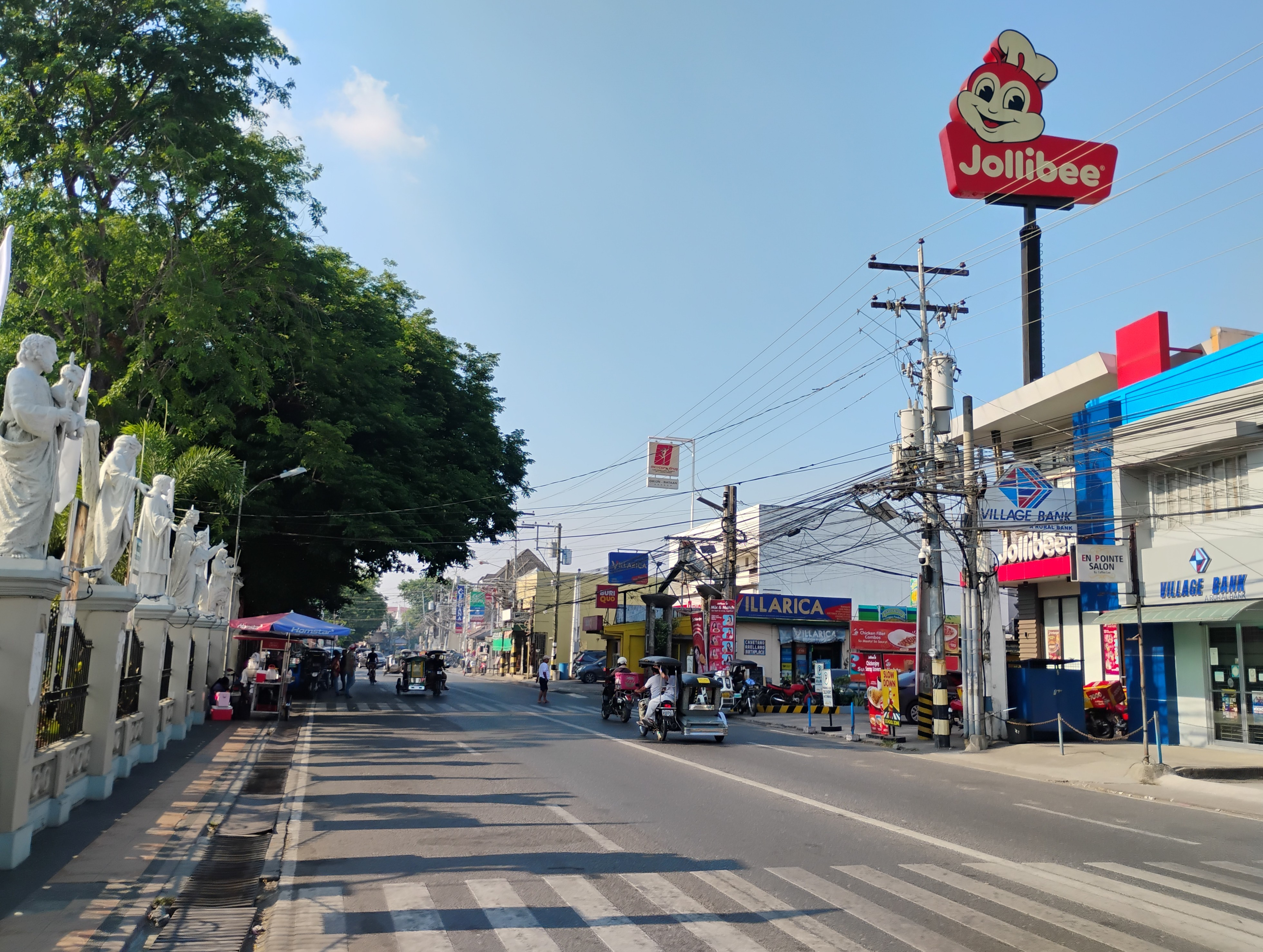
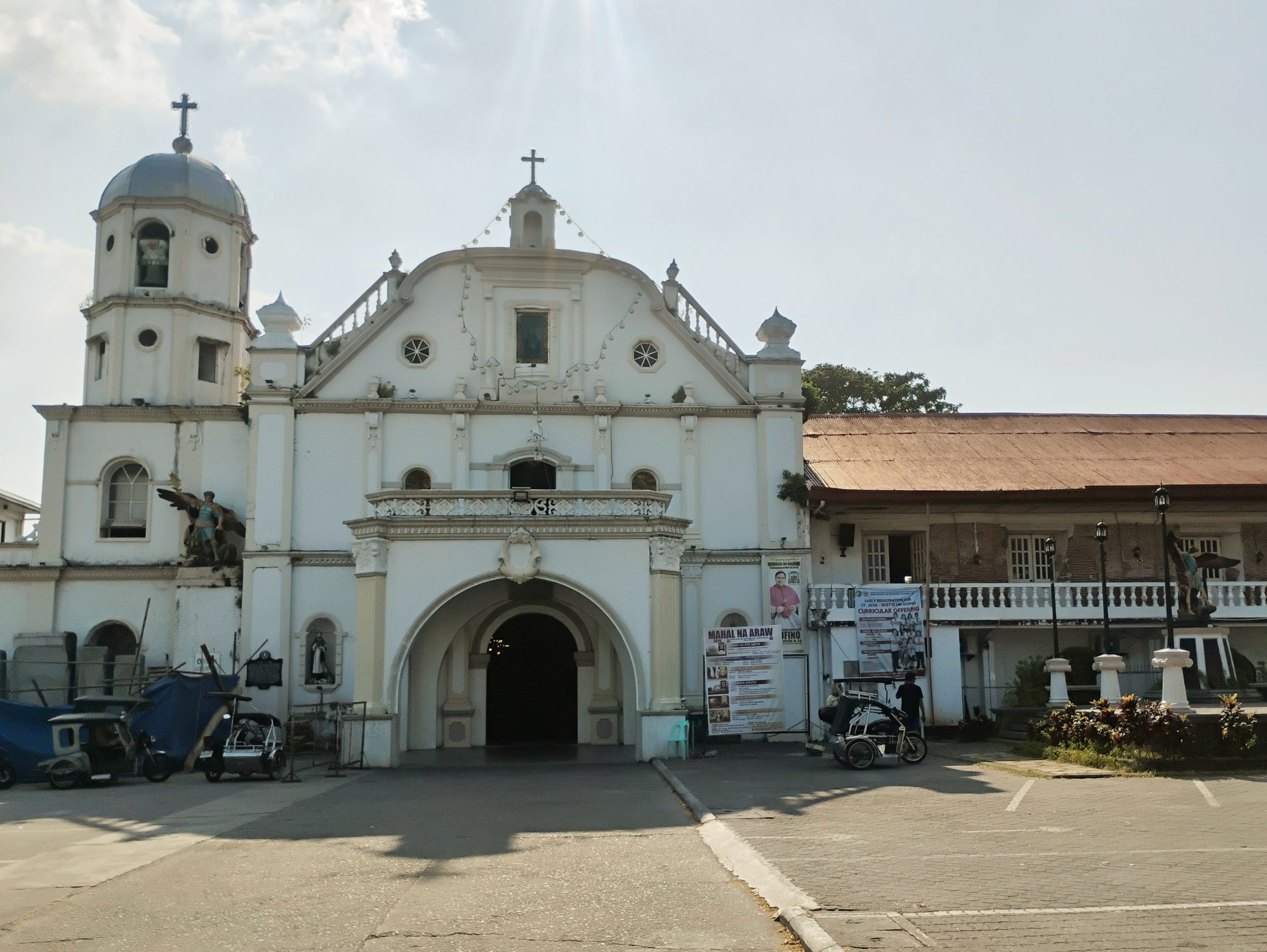
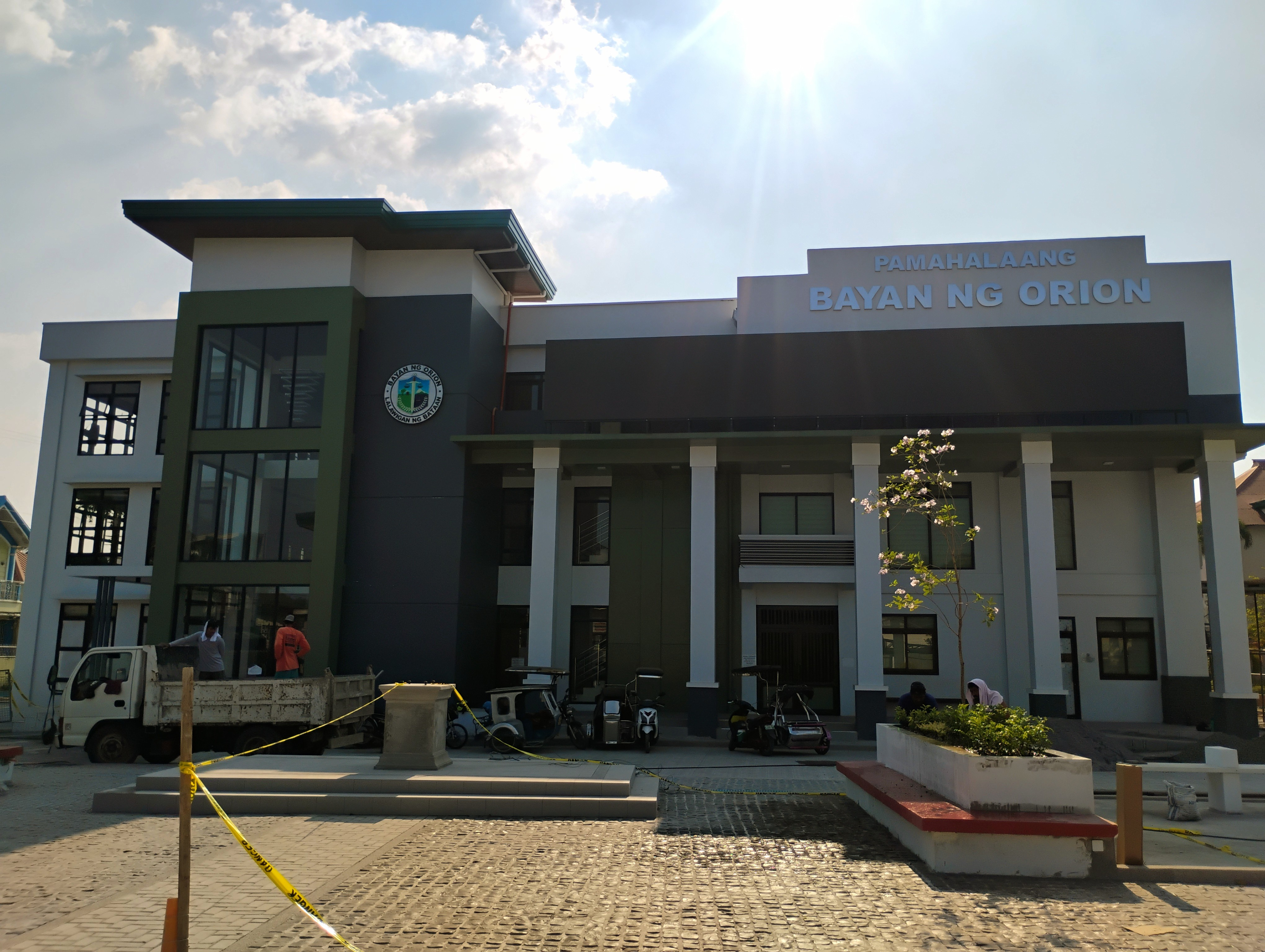
- Orion Town Proper Saint Michael the Archangel Parish Church Orion Municipal Hall

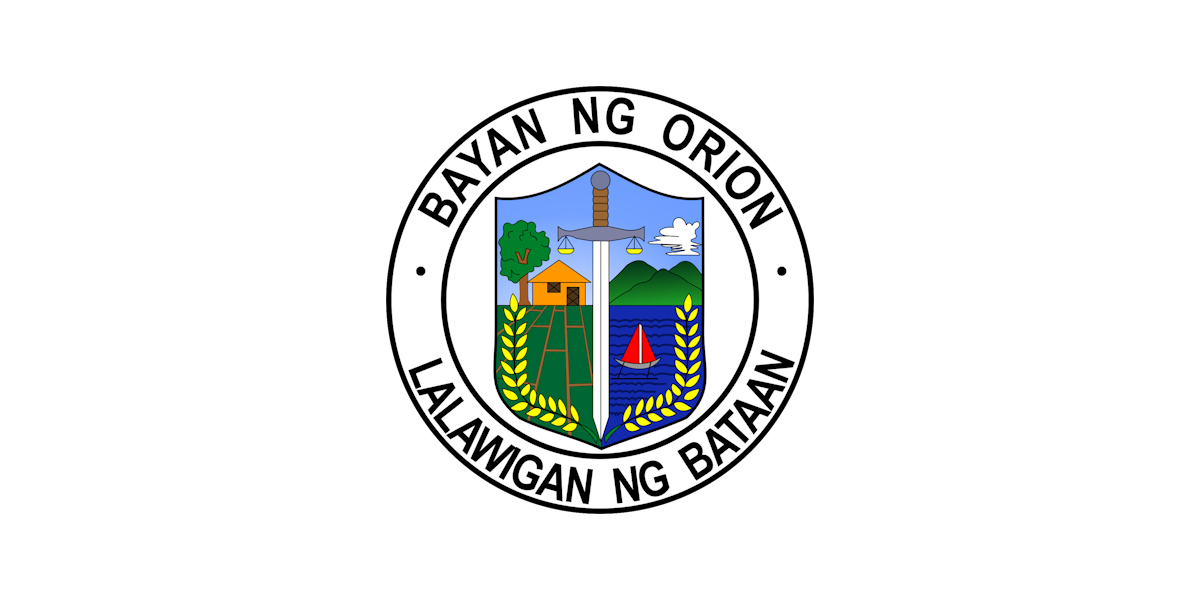
- Flag Seal

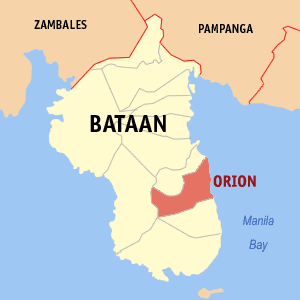
- Map of Bataan with Orion highlighted
- Interactive map of Orion
- Location within the Philippines
- Coordinates: 14°37′14″N 120°34′54″E
- Country: Philippines
- Region: Central Luzon
- Province: Bataan
- District: 2nd district
- Founded: 1680
- Barangays: 23 (see Barangays)

Government
  - Type: Sangguniang Bayan
  - Mayor: Antonio L. Raymundo Jr.
  - Vice Mayor: Rex Joseph R. Fuster
  - Representative: Albert Raymond S. Garcia
  - Municipal Council: Members: June D. Hernandez; Pepito E. Guinto; Donaldo R. Chan; Mercelita D. Cruz; Danilo D. Bunsoy; Ben Ruben L. Cruz; Marino D. Catalan; Concepcion C. Santos
  - Electorate: 40,292 voters (2025)

Area
  - Total: 65.41 km^{2} (25.25 sq mi)
- Elevation: 27 m (89 ft)
- Highest elevation: 258 m (846 ft)
- Lowest elevation: 0 m (0 ft)

Population (2024 census)
  - Total: 63,044
  - Density: 963.8/km^{2} (2,496/sq mi)
  - Households: 14,291

Economy
  - Income class: 1st municipal income class
  - Poverty incidence: 9.32% (2023)
  - Revenue: ₱ 342.8 million (2024)
  - Assets: ₱ 981.9 million (2024)
  - Expenditure: ₱ 276 million (2024)
  - Liabilities: ₱ 167.9 million (2024)

Service provider
  - Electricity: Peninsula Electric Cooperative (PENELCO)
- Time zone: UTC+8 (PST)
- ZIP code: 2102
- PSGC: 0300810000
- IDD : area code: +63 (0)47
- Native languages: Mariveleño; Tagalog
- Website: udyong.net

Orion, officially the Municipality of Orion (formerly Udyong), (Tagalog: Bayan ng Orion), is a municipality in the province of Bataan, Philippines. According to the 2024 census, it has a population of 63,044 people.

== Etymology ==
The town of Orion has various etymologies. One theory suggests that the town was initially called "Udyong," derived from the words "lu-ad" and "uryong," meaning muddy or swampy.

Another popular story states that during the Spanish colonial period, a group of soldiers passing through the area asked locals for the name of the place. Mistaking the question, the residents responded with "uod yon," which referred to a worm on the ground. The soldiers assumed it to be the name of the town and left, murmuring "uod, uod yon." Eventually, the town came to be known as Udyong, which was later changed to Orion.

== History ==
Orion's official recognition date is unknown, but records indicate that it was established by a Dominican priest on April 30, 1667. The 1818 Spanish census showed there to be 1,336 native families and 8 Spanish-Filipino families. On September 16, 1852, an earthquake struck the Philippines and destroyed the parochial church in Orion. The church was later reconstructed by Fr. Ulpiano Herrera, the parish priest at the time. A major fire ravaged the town in 1892, leaving only three houses unscathed. Fr. Jose Campomanes led the effort to rebuild the town, which transformed it into a thriving and attractive community.

=== 2019 Orion fire ===
On January 29, 2019, a massive fire burned down over 900 houses in Sitio Depensa, Barangay Kapunitan, killing 1 person, injuring 50 persons, and affecting 1,018 families, or 6,131 individuals. The blaze was attributed to children who carelessly played with matches and afterwards mistakenly tried to douse the flames with gasoline. The fire was able to spread quickly since the sitio consisted mostly of bamboo houses, most of which stored gasoline for fishing boats. The town was then placed under state of calamity.

== Geography ==
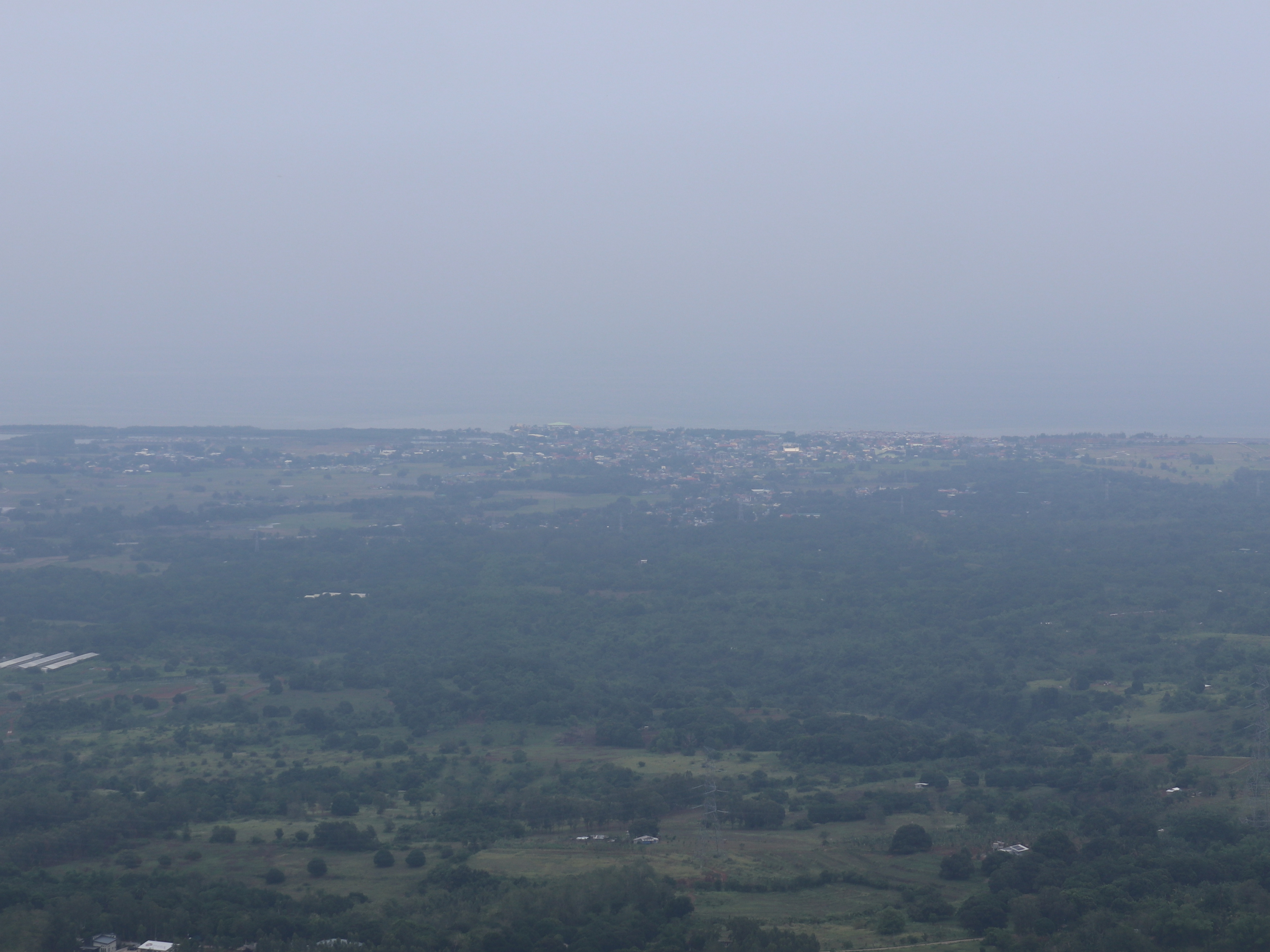
Skyline

Orion is a municipality located in the southern part of Bataan Peninsula directly south-southwest of San Fernando, Pampanga (the regional city center and provincial capital of Pampanga), north of Limay, Bataan, and south of Pilar, Bataan, accessible via the Roman Superhighway. It is 5 kilometres (3.1 mi) from Balanga and 129 kilometres (80 mi) from Manila.

According to the Philippine Statistics Authority, the municipality has a land area of 65.41 square kilometres (25.25 sq mi) constituting 4.76% of the 1,372.98-square-kilometre- (530.11 sq mi) total area of Bataan.

=== Climate ===
Climate data for Orion, Bataan
Month	Jan	Feb	Mar	Apr	May	Jun	Jul	Aug	Sep	Oct	Nov	Dec	Year
Mean daily maximum °C (°F)	31 (88)	32 (90)	34 (93)	35 (95)	33 (91)	31 (88)	29 (84)	29 (84)	29 (84)	29 (84)	30 (86)	31 (88)	31 (88)
Mean daily minimum °C (°F)	19 (66)	19 (66)	20 (68)	23 (73)	25 (77)	25 (77)	24 (75)	25 (77)	25 (77)	24 (75)	23 (73)	20 (68)	23 (73)
Average precipitation mm (inches)	7 (0.3)	8 (0.3)	14 (0.6)	26 (1.0)	127 (5.0)	210 (8.3)	263 (10.4)	272 (10.7)	218 (8.6)	114 (4.5)	46 (1.8)	21 (0.8)	1,326 (52.3)
Average rainy days	4.0	4.0	6.9	11.2	21.0	24.5	27.4	26.9	25.9	21.9	13.4	6.3	193.4
Source: Meteoblue (modeled/calculated data, not measured locally)

=== Barangays ===
Orion is politically subdivided into 23 barangays. Each barangay consists of puroks and some have sitios.

PSGC	Barangay	Population			±% p.a.	
		2024		2010		
030810001	Arellano (Poblacion)	1.0%	644	659	▾	−0.16%
030810002	Bagumbayan (Poblacion)	2.1%	1,309	1,309	Steady	0.00%
030810003	Balagtas (Poblacion)	3.1%	1,963	1,833	▴	0.47%
030810004	Balut (Poblacion)	2.2%	1,391	1,287	▴	0.54%
030810007	Bantan	2.2%	1,403	1,421	▾	−0.09%
030810008	Bilolo	10.8%	6,803	5,842	▴	1.05%
030810009	Calungusan	2.6%	1,610	1,479	▴	0.59%
030810010	Camachile	2.5%	1,587	1,645	▾	−0.25%
030810011	Daang Bago (Poblacion)	1.5%	969	1,016	▾	−0.33%
030810012	Daang Bilolo (Poblacion)	4.4%	2,745	2,543	▴	0.53%
030810013	Daang Pare	10.0%	6,297	4,287	▴	2.68%
030810014	General Lim (Kaput)	6.3%	3,956	3,213	▴	1.44%
030810016	Kapunitan	8.3%	5,237	5,036	▴	0.27%
030810017	Lati (Poblacion)	1.8%	1,113	1,368	▾	−1.41%
030810018	Lusungan (Poblacion)	2.6%	1,647	1,638	▴	0.04%
030810020	Puting Buhangin	4.3%	2,696	2,600	▴	0.25%
030810021	Sabatan (Poblacion)	5.8%	3,651	3,294	▴	0.71%
030810022	San Vicente (Poblacion)	2.2%	1,391	1,360	▴	0.16%
030810030	Santa Elena (Poblacion)	2.8%	1,736	1,501	▴	1.01%
030810024	Santo Domingo (Poblacion)	6.5%	4,107	3,827	▴	0.49%
030810027	Villa Angeles (Poblacion)	1.8%	1,161	1,480	▾	−1.66%
030810028	Wakas (Poblacion)	1.2%	768	1,008	▾	−1.86%
030810029	Wawa (Poblacion)	2.9%	1,818	1,808	▴	0.04%
	Total		63,044	51,454	▴	1.41%

== Demographics ==
Population census of Orion

Year	Pop.	±% p.a.
1903	7,187	—
1918	7,979	+0.70%
1939	10,909	+1.50%
1948	8,721	−2.46%
1960	14,672	+4.43%
1970	19,672	+2.97%
1975	24,283	+4.31%
1980	28,049	+2.92%

Year	Pop.	±% p.a.
1990	35,263	+2.32%
1995	39,537	+2.17%
2000	44,067	+2.35%
2007	49,164	+1.52%
2010	51,454	+1.67%
2015	56,002	+1.63%
2020	60,771	+1.74%
2024	63,044	+0.89%

Source: Philippine Statistics Authority

In the 2024 census, Orion had a population of 63,044 people. The population density was 960 inhabitants per square kilometre (2,500/sq mi).

== Economy ==
Poverty incidence of Orion (%)

Source: Philippine Statistics Authority

== Government ==
=== Elected officials ===
Members of the Orion Municipal Council (2022-2025)
Position	Name of official
District Representative (2nd Legislative District, Bataan)	Albert Raymund Garcia
Municipal Mayor	Antonio L. Raymundo Jr.
Municipal Vice Mayor	Rex Joseph R. Fuster
Municipal Councilors	June D. Hernandez
Municipal Councilors	Pepito E. Guinto
Municipal Councilors	Donaldo R. Chan
Municipal Councilors	Mercelita D. Cruz
Municipal Councilors	Danilo D. Bunsoy
Municipal Councilors	Ben Ruben L. Cruz
Municipal Councilors	Marino D. Catalan
Municipal Councilors	Concepcion C. Santos

== Education ==
The Orion Schools District Office governs all educational institutions within the municipality. It oversees the management and operations of all private and public, from primary to secondary schools.

=== Primary and elementary schools ===
- Arellano Elementary School
- Bantan Elementary School
- Bilolo Elementary School
- Calungusan Elementary School
- Camachile Elementary School
- Capunitan Elementary School
- Daan Pare Elementary School
- Eva Aeta Elementary School
- General Lim Elementary School
- Gethsemane Ecumenical School
- Pablo R. Roman Elementary School
- Puting Buhangin Elementary School
- Sabatan Elementary School
- Saint Michael the Archangel Academy
- St. Francis Catholic School of Bataan
- St. Michael Kinder and Elementary School
- Sta. Elena Elementary School
- Sto. Domingo Elementary School

=== Secondary schools ===
- Bataan School of Fisheries
- Jose Rizal Institute
- Justice E.A.Gancayco Memorial High School
- Udyong National High School

== Notable personalities ==
- Cayetano Arellano — was the first Chief Justice of the Supreme Court of the Philippines under the American Civil Government. He was Chief Justice from 1901 until his retirement on April 12, 1920, making him the longest-serving Chief Justice.
- Francisco Baltazar — known much more widely through his nom-de-plume and birth name Francisco Balagtas, was a prominent Filipino poet. The famous epic, Florante at Laura, is regarded as his defining work.
- Kerby Raymundo — is a retired Filipino professional basketball player who last played for Meralco Bolts in the Philippine Basketball Association. Known as "The Kid", he was a former star player with the Letran Knights during his NCAA years.
- Eric Rodriguez — PBA player, played for the teams Burger King Titans, Air21, Meralco and Ginebra. Tough defense and role player and lead the team Letran Knights under coach Louie Alas at the NCAA 2002–2005.
- Janine Tugonon — is a Filipina beauty titleholder who placed first runner-up in the Miss Universe 2012 pageant. She placed first runner up in the Binibining Pilipinas 2011, but won in Binibining Pilipinas 2012, and became the representative of the Philippines in Miss Universe 2012 and placed first runner-up behind Miss USA, Olivia Culpo.
- Raymond Almazan — is a Filipino professional basketball player who currently plays for Meralco Bolts in the Philippine Basketball Association. He is given a moniker "The Rock 'N` Roll" by sportscaster Mico Halili because of his resemblance to Pinoy rock legend Joey "Pepe" Smith.
- Emilio Gancayco (August 20, 1921 - July 28, 2009) was a Filipino judge. Gancayco was judge of the Philippine Supreme Court from 1987 to 1991.

== Gallery ==
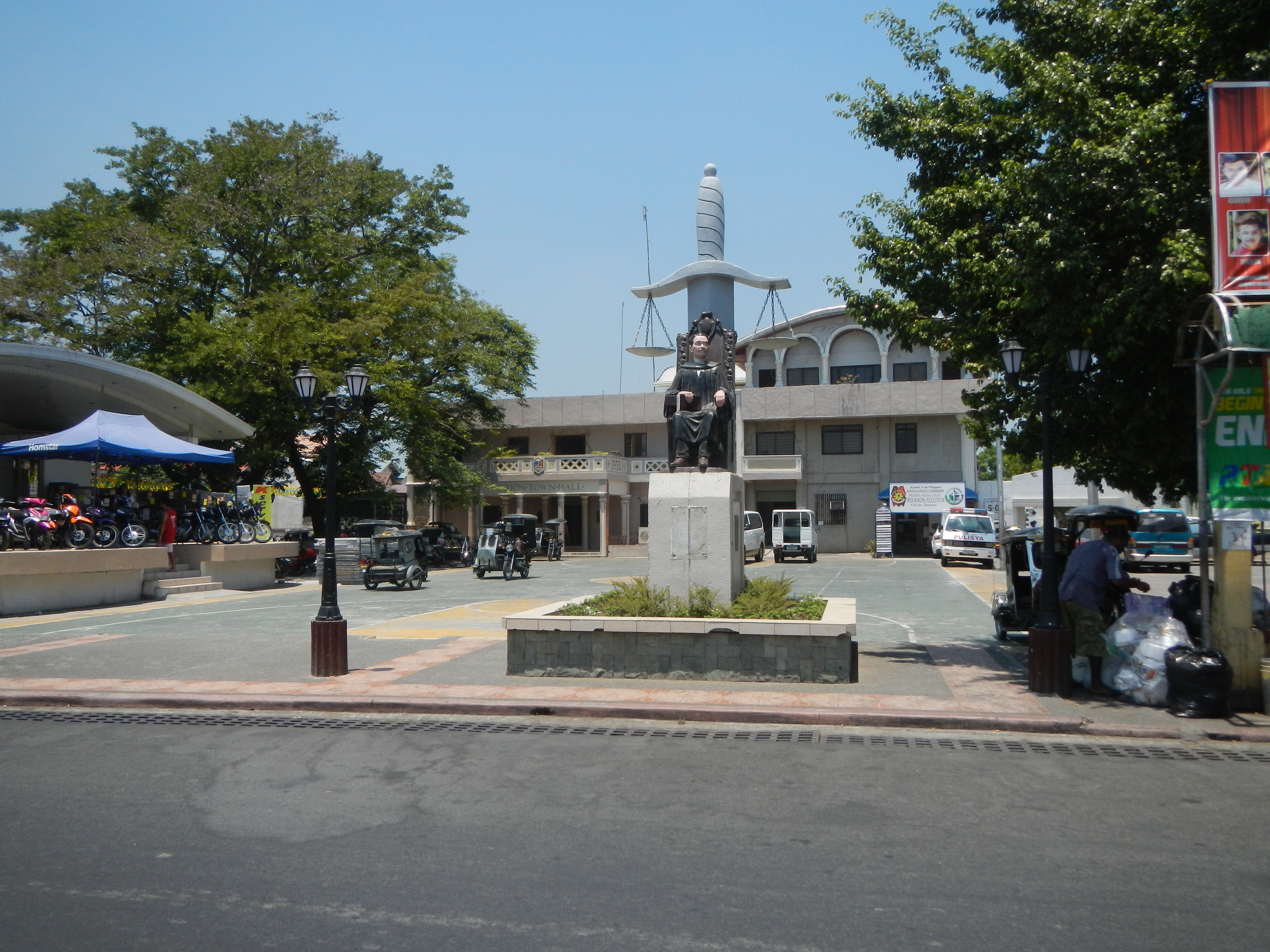
Municipal hall

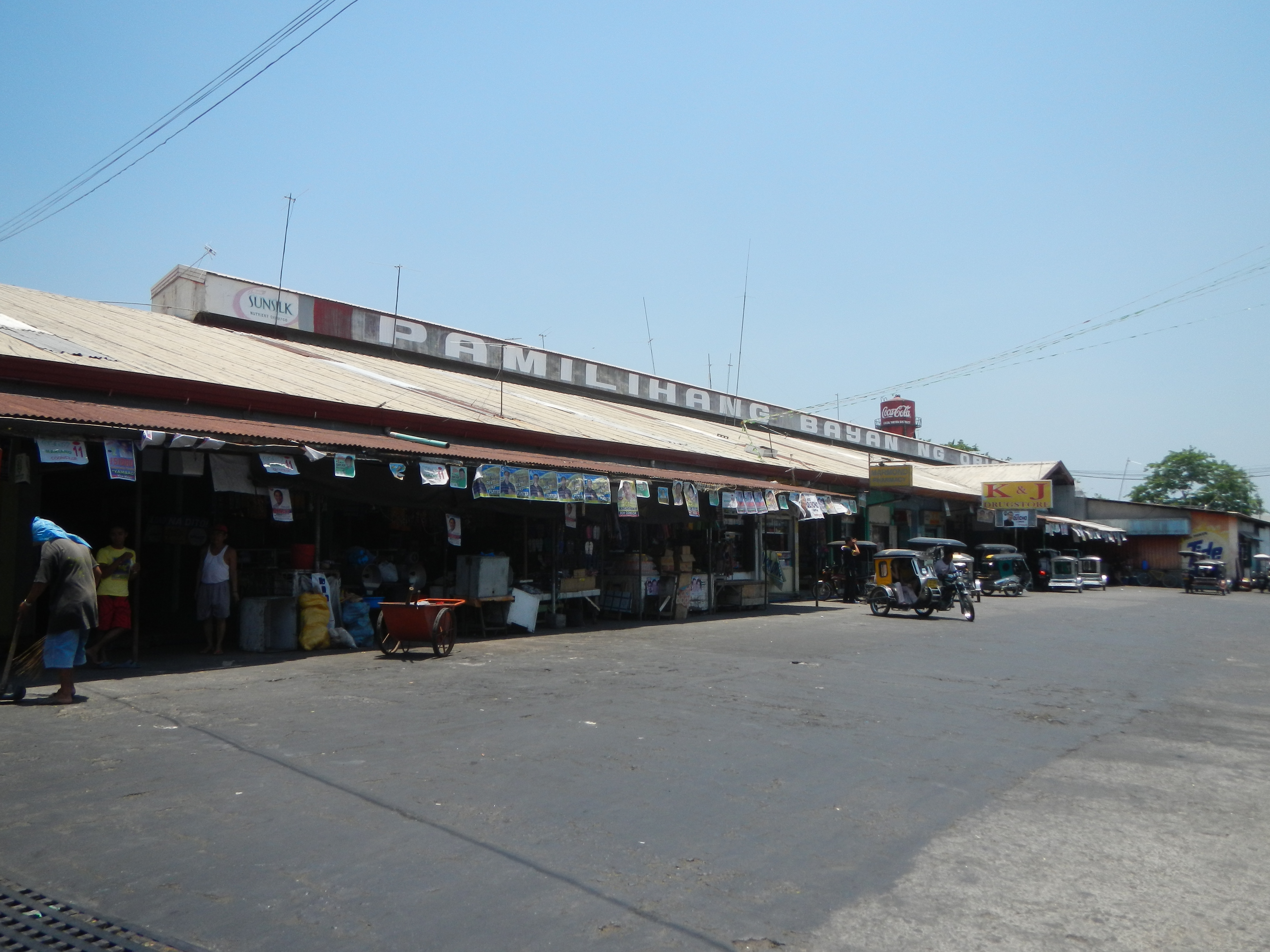
Public market

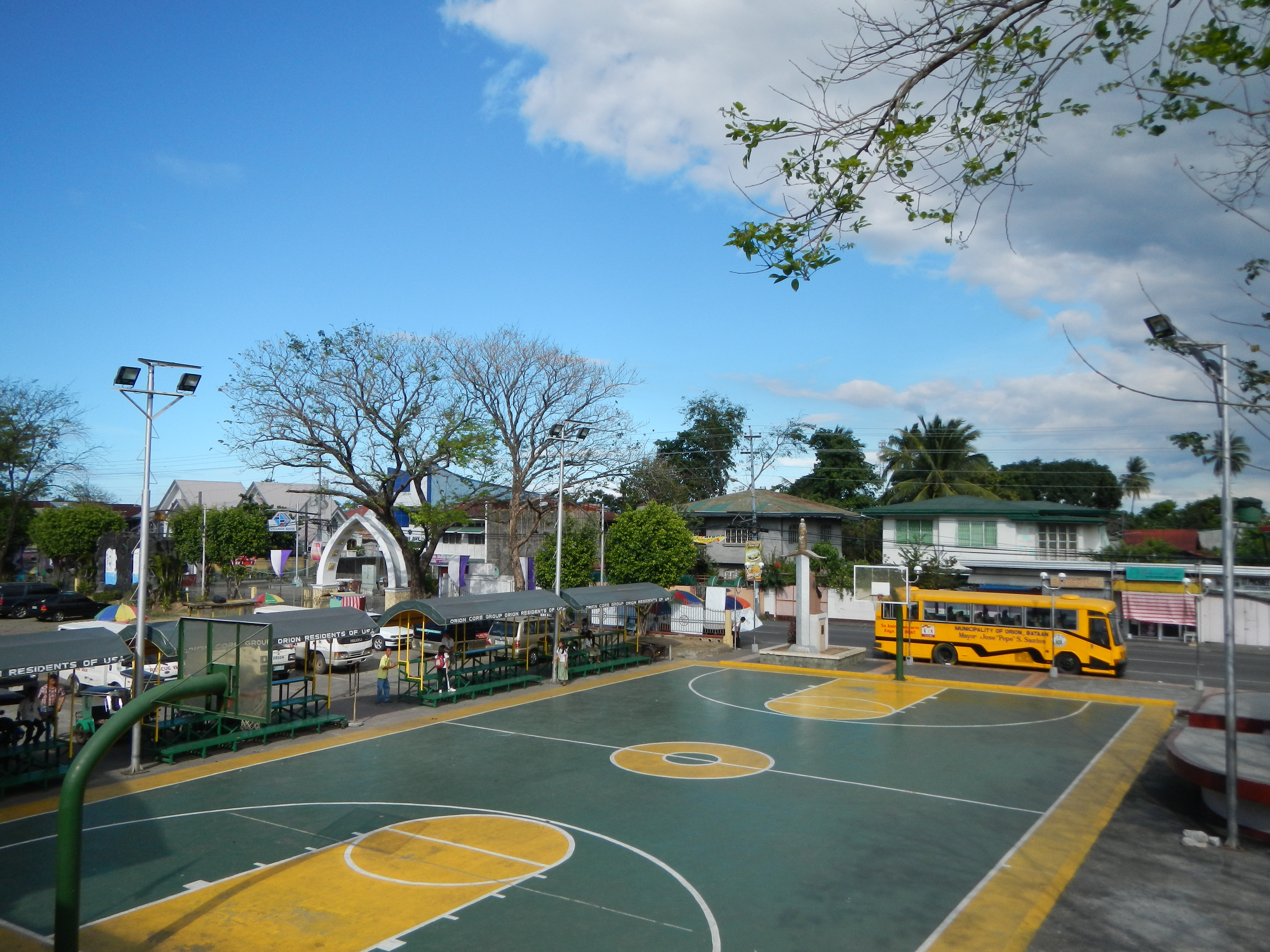
Town center

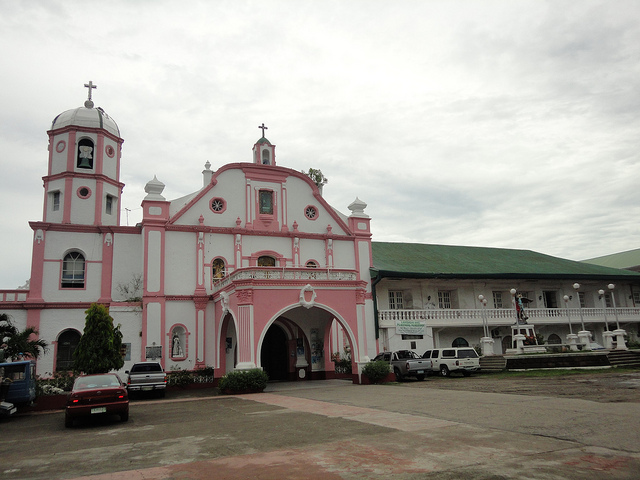
Saint Michael the Archangel Parish Church

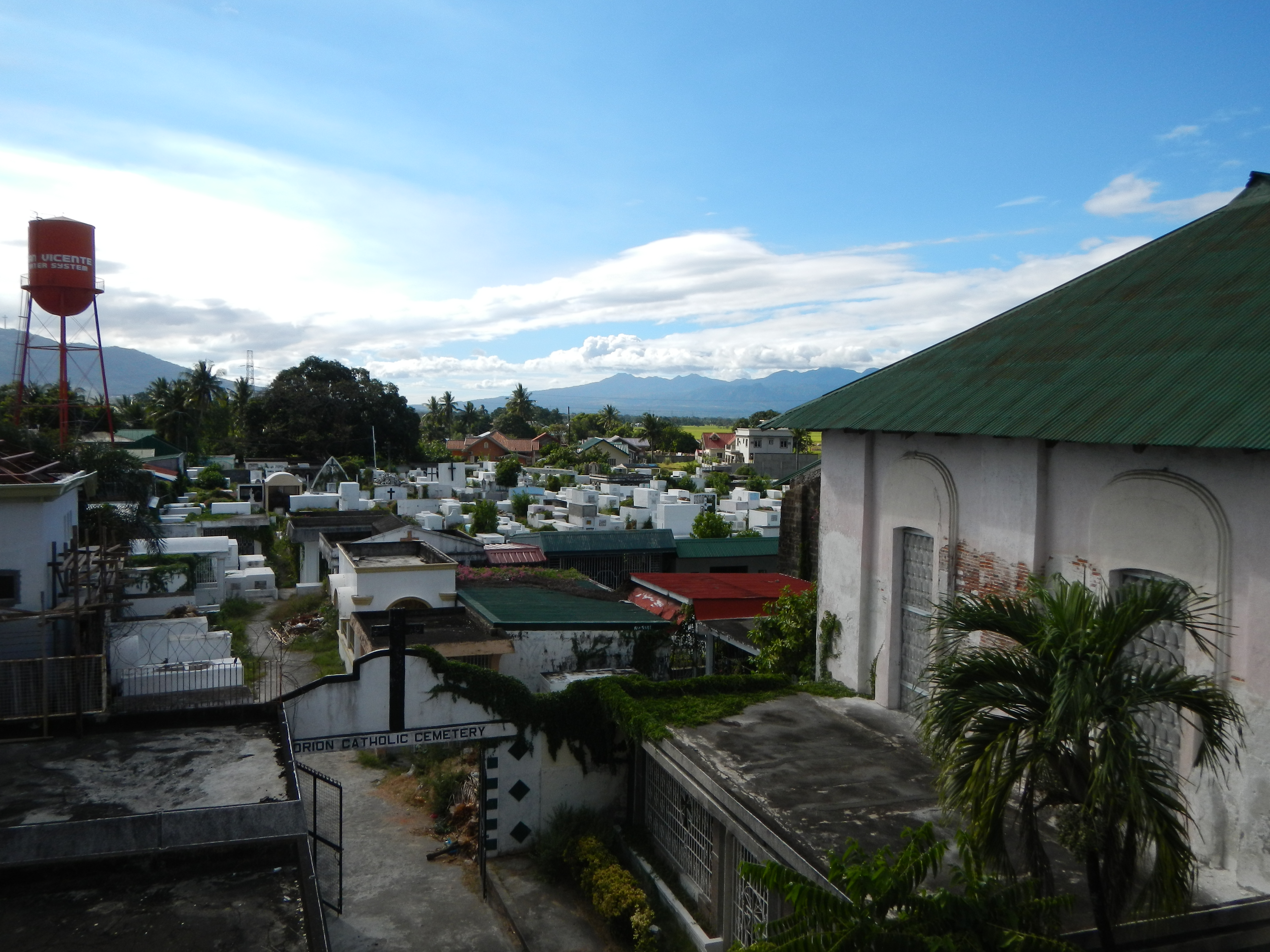
Orion Catholic Cemetery
