= Awit (poem) =

Filipino poetry form

The awit (Tagalog for "song") is a type of Filipino poem, consisting of 12-syllable quatrains. It follows the pattern of rhyming stanzas established in the Philippine epic Pasyon. It is similar in form to the corrido.

One influential work in the awit form is Florante at Laura, an 1838 narrative poem by Francisco Balagtas.

== See also ==
- Dalit (poem)
- Syllabic verse
- Tanaga
