= Hitomaro (crater) =

Crater on Mercury

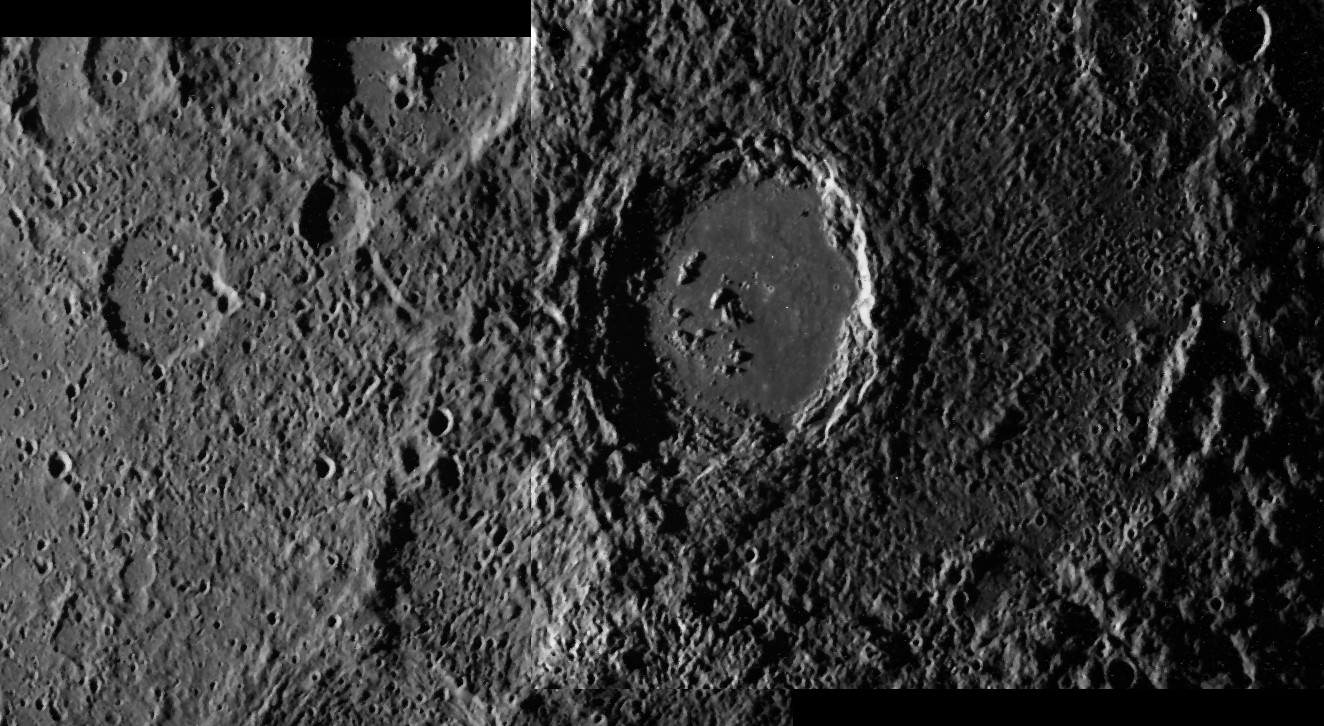
- Mariner 10 mosaic of Hitomaro
- Feature type: Impact crater
- Location: Kuiper quadrangle, Mercury
- Coordinates: 16.07°S 15.65°W
- Diameter: 105 km (65 mi)
- Eponym: Kakinomoto no Hitomaro

Hitomaro is a crater on Mercury. It has a diameter of 105 kilometers. Its name was adopted by the International Astronomical Union (IAU) in 1976. Hitomaro is named for the Japanese poet Kakinomoto no Hitomaro, who lived from the 650s to roughly 709. The crater was first imaged by Mariner 10 in 1974.

The impactor that created Hitomaro crater struck the west side of an older and larger peak ring basin (unnamed). The crater itself is unusual in that its central peak complex is offset to the west. It also possesses a ray system that has two dark lobes to the north and south, and lighter portions to the east and west. There are also hollows on the crater floor. A dark spot is present to the southeast of the crater rim.

Hitomaro is located west of the much larger Sanai crater. The crater Dvorák is to the northeast of Hitomaro. Balagtas, Kenkō, and Mahler are to the south.

== Views ==
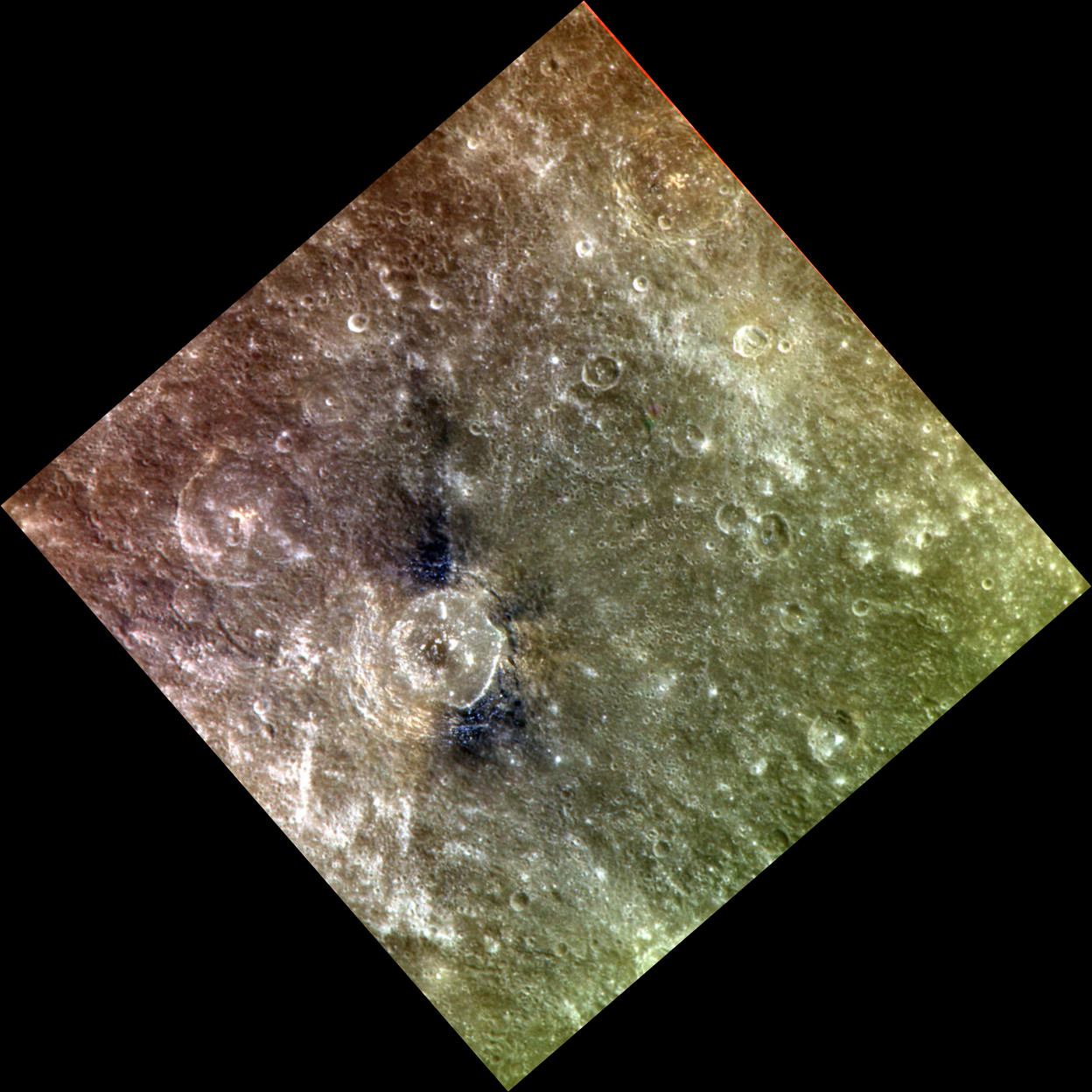
Approximate color view by MESSENGER, with Hitomaro near center.

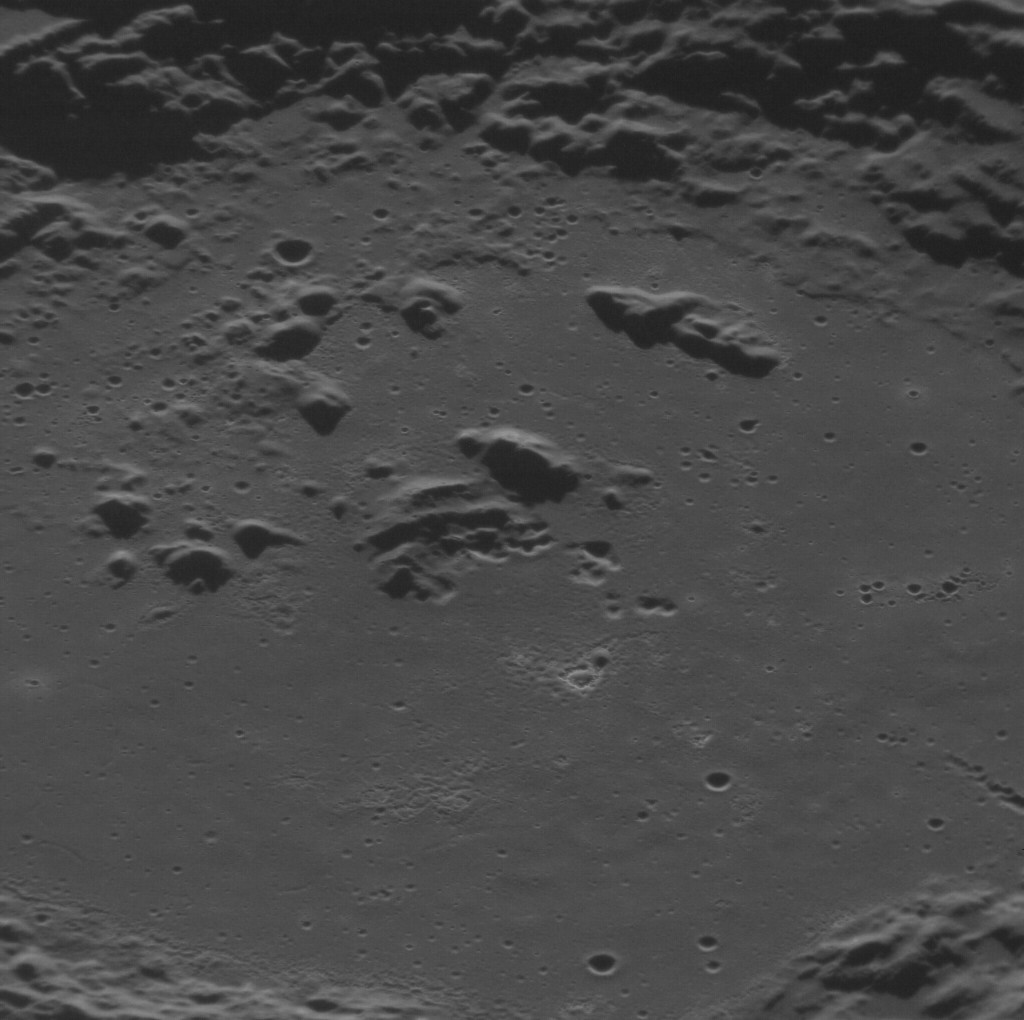
Oblique view of the central crater. Some of the irregular, bright depressions are hollows.

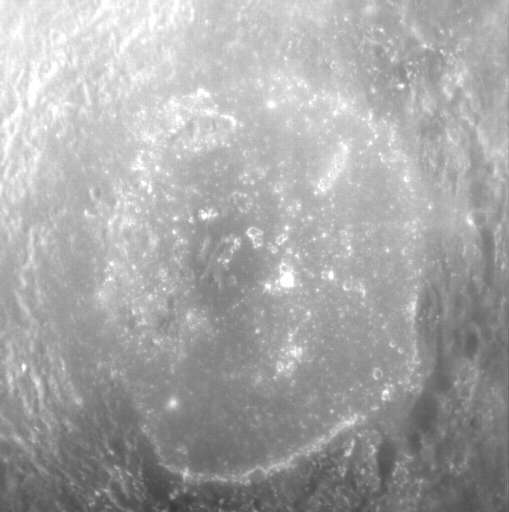
View of most of the crater at a high sun angle, also showing the hollows
