= Dalit (poem) =

A dalit is a traditional form of indigenous Filipino poetry. It is a short, highly structured poem consisting of four lines (a quatrain), with each line containing exactly eight syllables. Historically, the dalit was used for religious or didactic purposes, but it has evolved over time to encompass various themes and has seen a modern resurgence in both literary education and digital storytelling.

== Structure and form ==
The strict poetic structure of the dalit sets it apart from other traditional Filipino poetic forms, such as the tanaga (which features seven syllables per line) and the diona (which consists of three lines of seven syllables).

A standard dalit requires the following structural elements:

- Four lines per stanza.
- Eight syllables per line (octosyllabic).
- A traditional single rhyme scheme (monorhyme), typically following an AAAA pattern. However, modern writers adapting the form have also utilized rhyming couplets (AABB) or alternating rhymes (ABAB, ABBA).

== History ==
The exact origins of the dalit are a subject of historical debate among scholars of Philippine literature. One school of thought argues that the form is entirely indigenous and pre-Hispanic, functioning originally as a chant or song for worship, mourning, or conveying moral lessons.

Another view suggests that the dalit has Spanish origins or was heavily influenced by Spanish poetic traditions, specifically because its even syllabification (pares) closely aligns with European metric styles.

Regardless of its true origin, it is widely documented that during the Spanish colonization of the Philippines, Spanish friars recognized the popularity of the dalit among the native population. They actively reappropriated the poetic form to promote Catholicism, using it to compose meditative verses, hymns, and prayers that were appended to novenas and catechisms. While these religious dalits sometimes lacked a fixed overarching meter across an entire volume, they consistently maintained the solemn tone and the core octosyllabic quatrain structure.

== Modern resurgence ==
In the 21st century, the dalit is frequently categorized as a marginalized poetic form, especially when compared to the dominance of modern free verse. However, intentional efforts have been made by educators and writers to reawaken interest in indigenous Philippine poetry.

The advent of short messaging service (SMS) technology in the Philippines birthed the "textula" (text poem) movement. Competitions like the "Textanaga Contest" launched in 2002 paved the way for traditional forms, including the dalit, tanaga, and diona, to be written, shared, and preserved via mobile phones. Academic studies suggest that integrating the dalit through mobile textula is a highly effective method for teaching language, literature, and socio-cultural awareness to modern learners.

Additionally, Filipino and Filipino-American writers have launched digital campaigns to reclaim the dalit, encouraging the writing of these octosyllabic poems to express contemporary immigrant experiences, cultural identity, and personal narratives.

== See also ==
- Tanaga
- Philippine literature
- Spoken word

== See also ==
- Awit (poem)
