= Kenkō (crater) =

Crater on Mercury

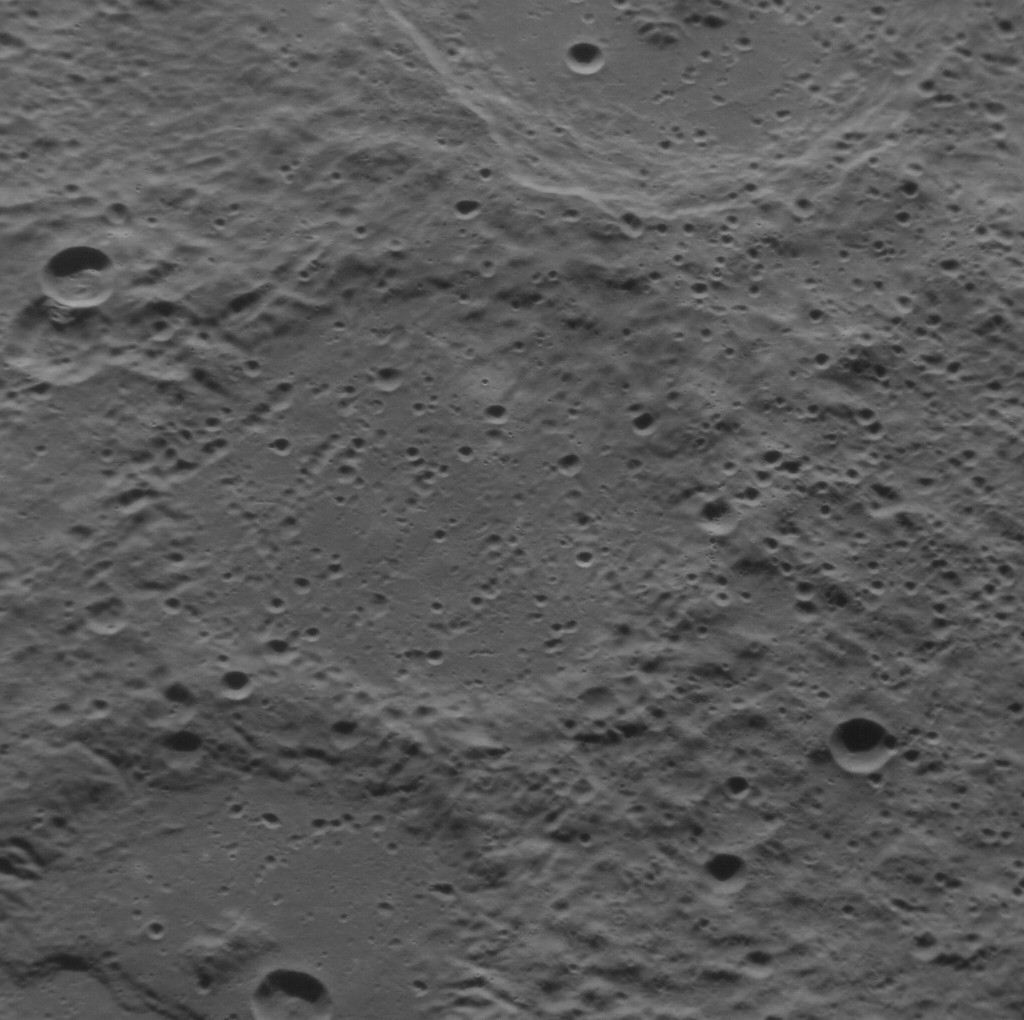
- MESSENGER NAC image of Kenkō
- Feature type: Impact crater
- Location: Discovery quadrangle, Mercury
- Coordinates: 21.35°S 16.16°W
- Diameter: 105 km (65 mi)
- Eponym: Yoshida Kenkō

Kenkō is a crater on Mercury. Its name was adopted by the International Astronomical Union (IAU) in 1976. Kenko is named for the Japanese author Yoshida Kenkō, who lived from 1283 to 1352. The crater was first imaged by Mariner 10 in 1974.

Balagtas crater is to the east of Kenkō, Mahler is to the west, and Hitomaro is to the north.

== Views ==
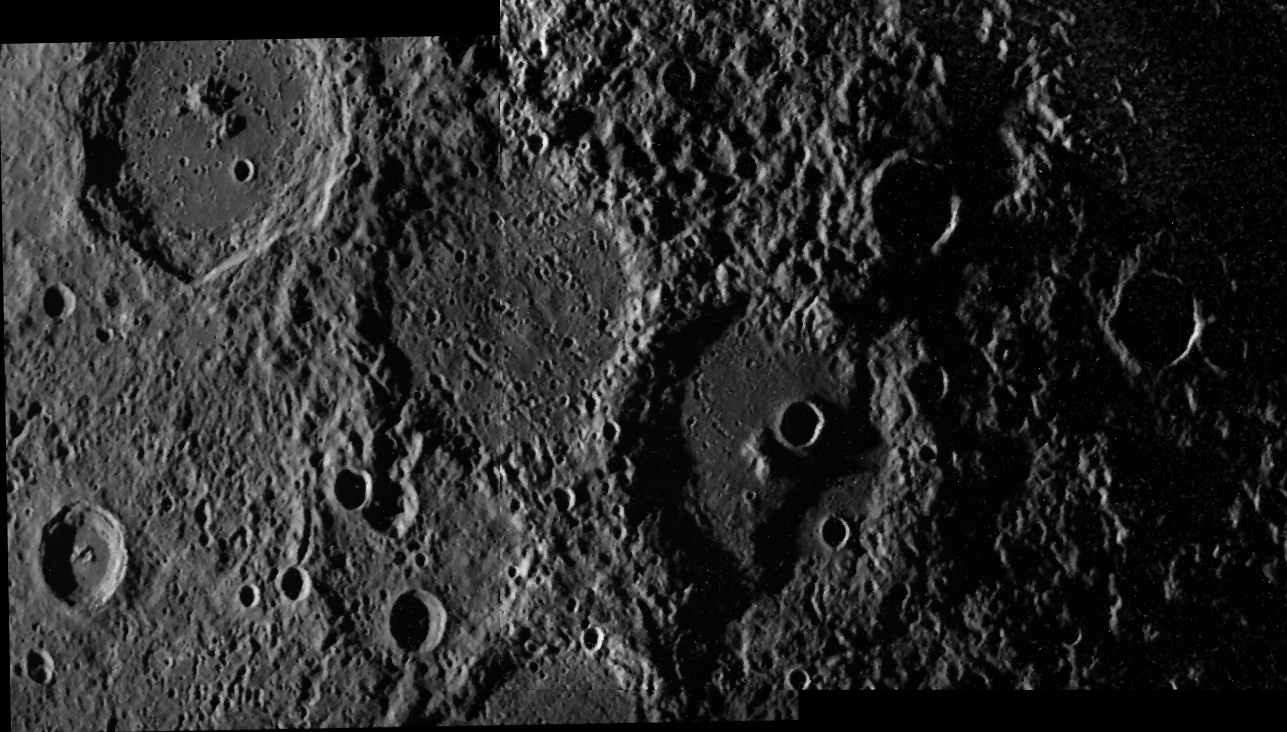
Mosaic of Mariner 10 images with Balagtas at right, Kenkō at center, and Mahler in upper left

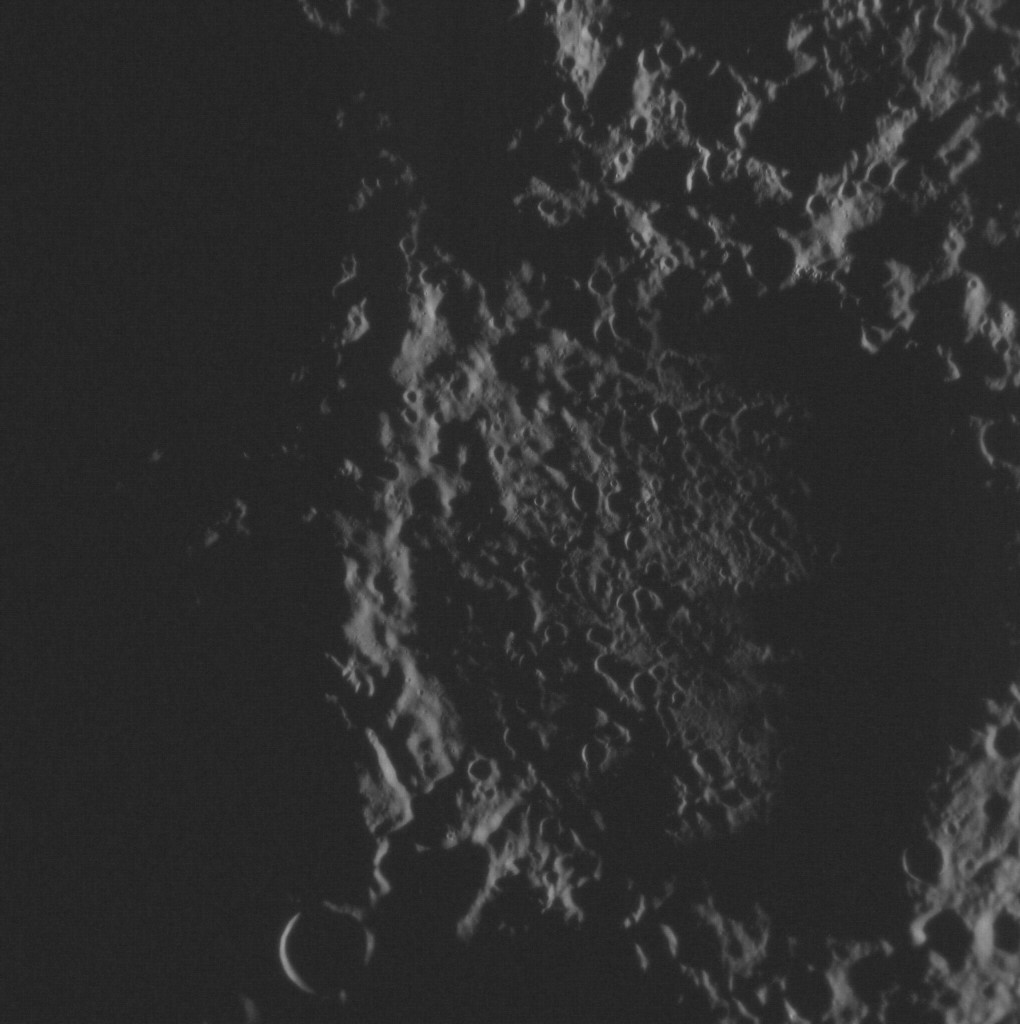
Kenkō at the terminator

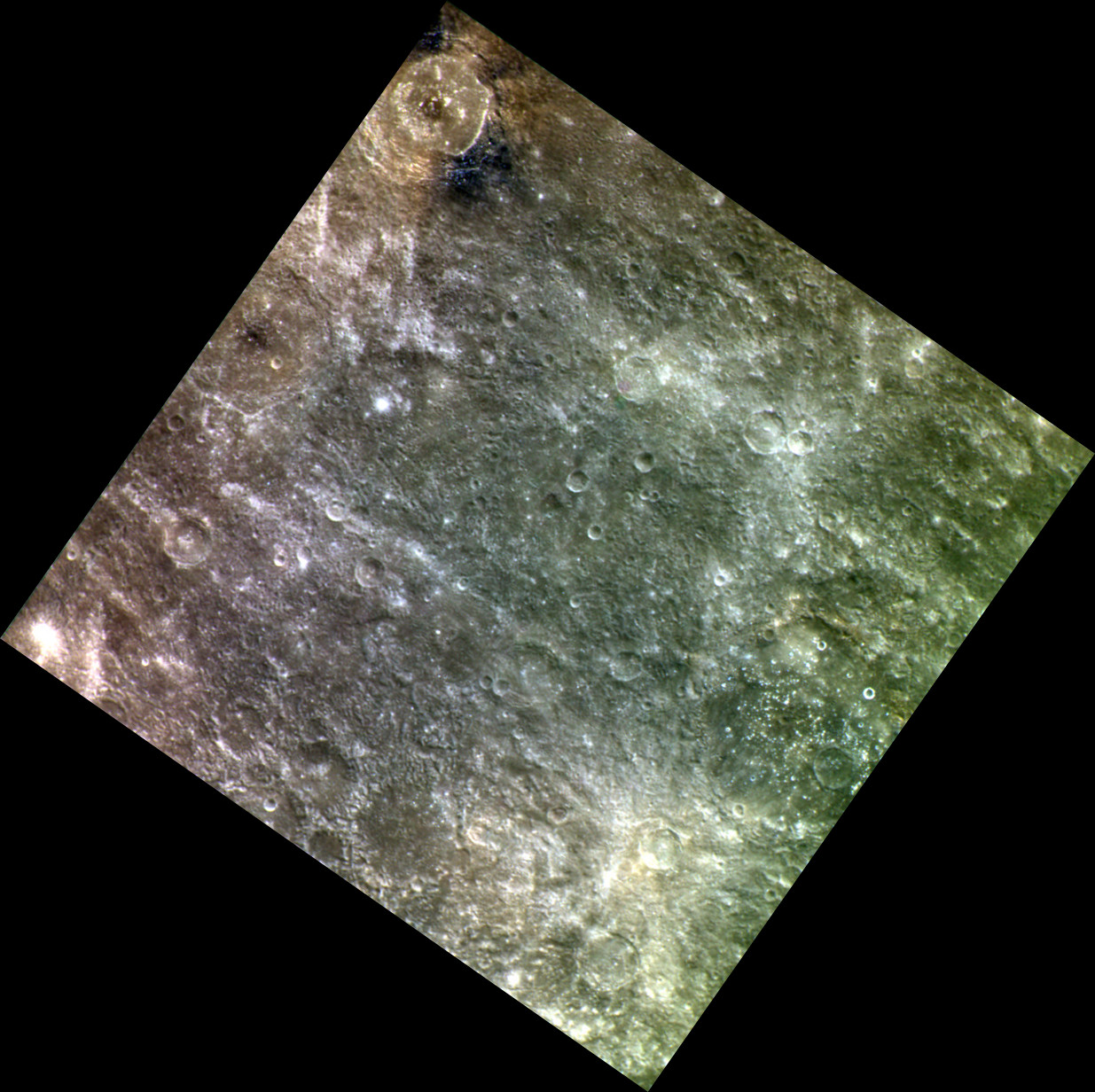
Regional approximate color view by MESSENGER, with Kenkō near center (indistinct)
