= Mahler (crater) =

Crater on Mercury

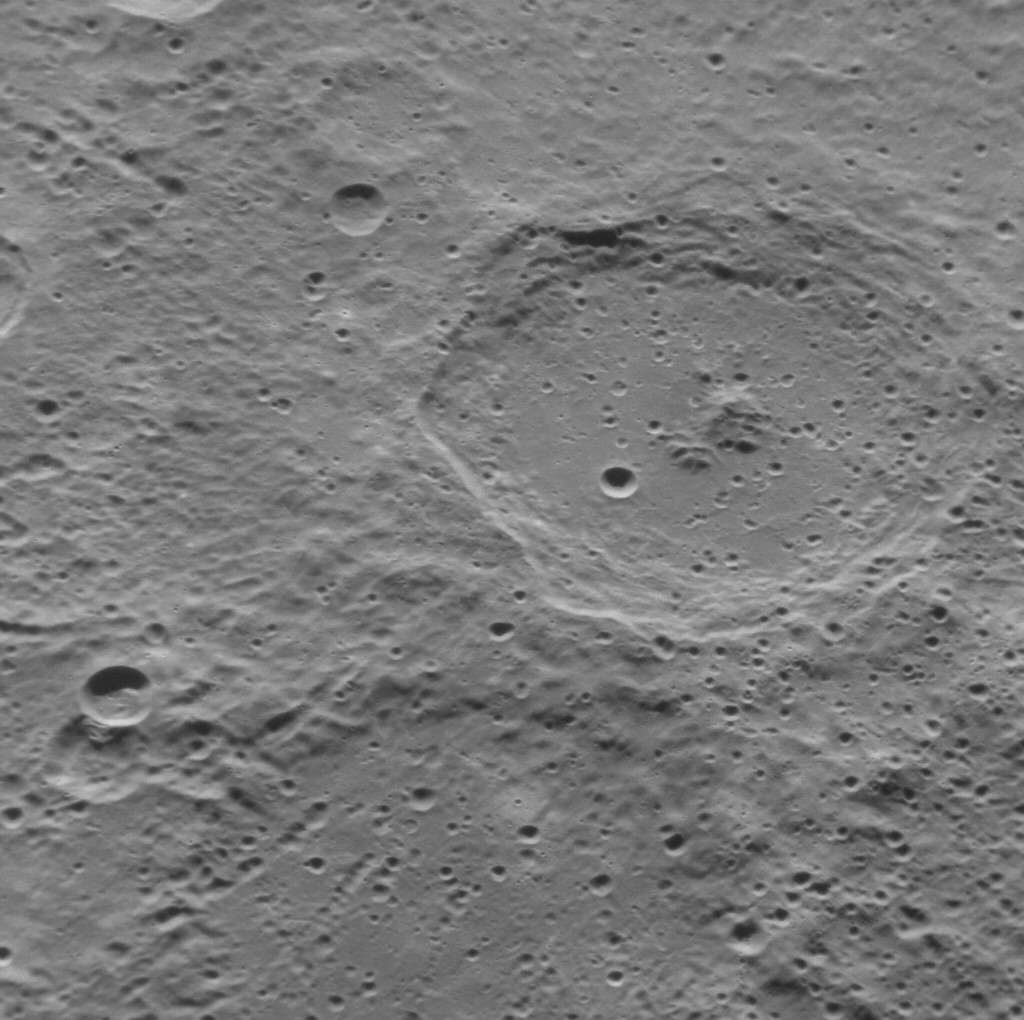
- Oblique MESSENGER NAC image of Mahler
- Feature type: Impact crater
- Location: Kuiper quadrangle, Mercury
- Coordinates: 19.68°S 18.82°W
- Diameter: 104 km (65 mi)
- Eponym: Gustav Mahler

Mahler is a crater on Mercury. It has a diameter of 103 kilometers. Its name was adopted by the International Astronomical Union (IAU) in 1976. Mahler is named for the Austrian composer Gustav Mahler, who lived from 1860 to 1911. The crater was first imaged by Mariner 10 in 1974.

The central peak complex of Mahler is a dark spot associated with hollows.

Kenkō crater is to the east of Mahler, and Hitomaro is to the north.

== Views ==
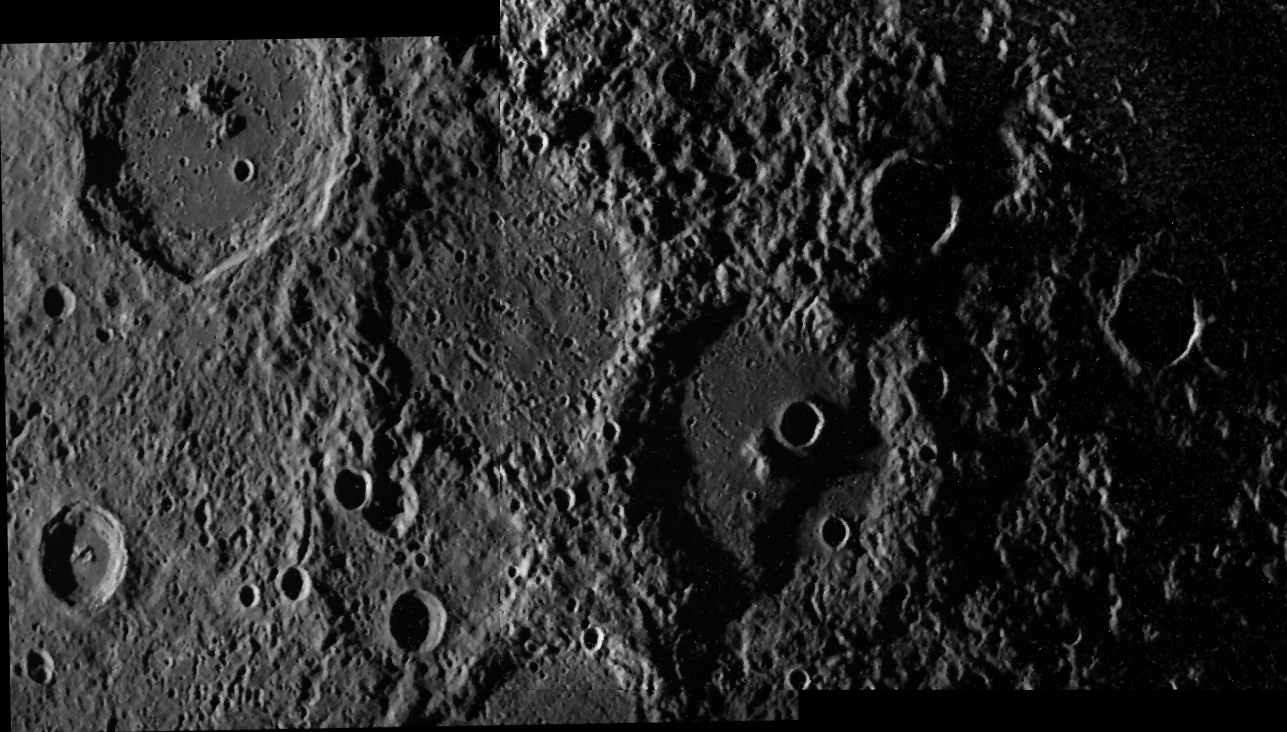
Mosaic of Mariner 10 images with Balagtas at right, Kenkō at center, and Mahler in upper left

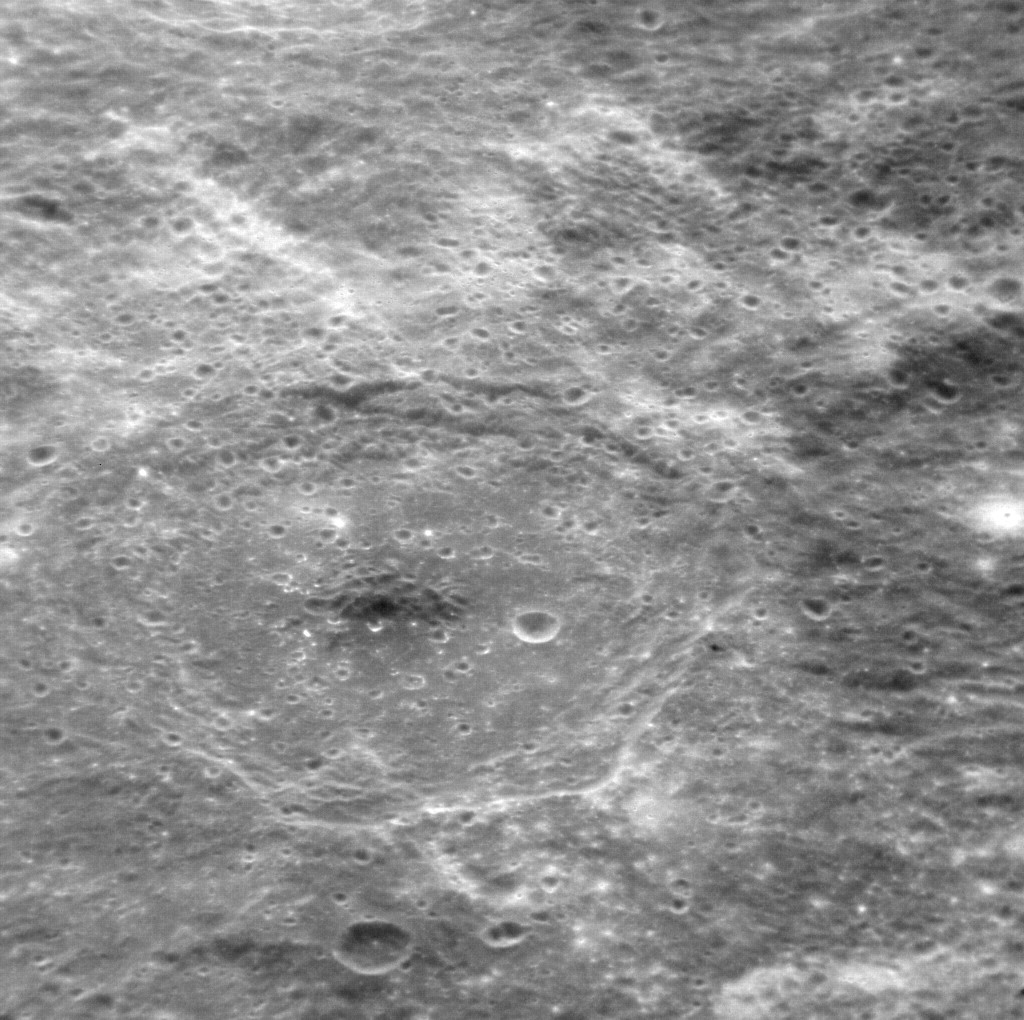
Another oblique view at high sun angle, showing the darkness of the central peak

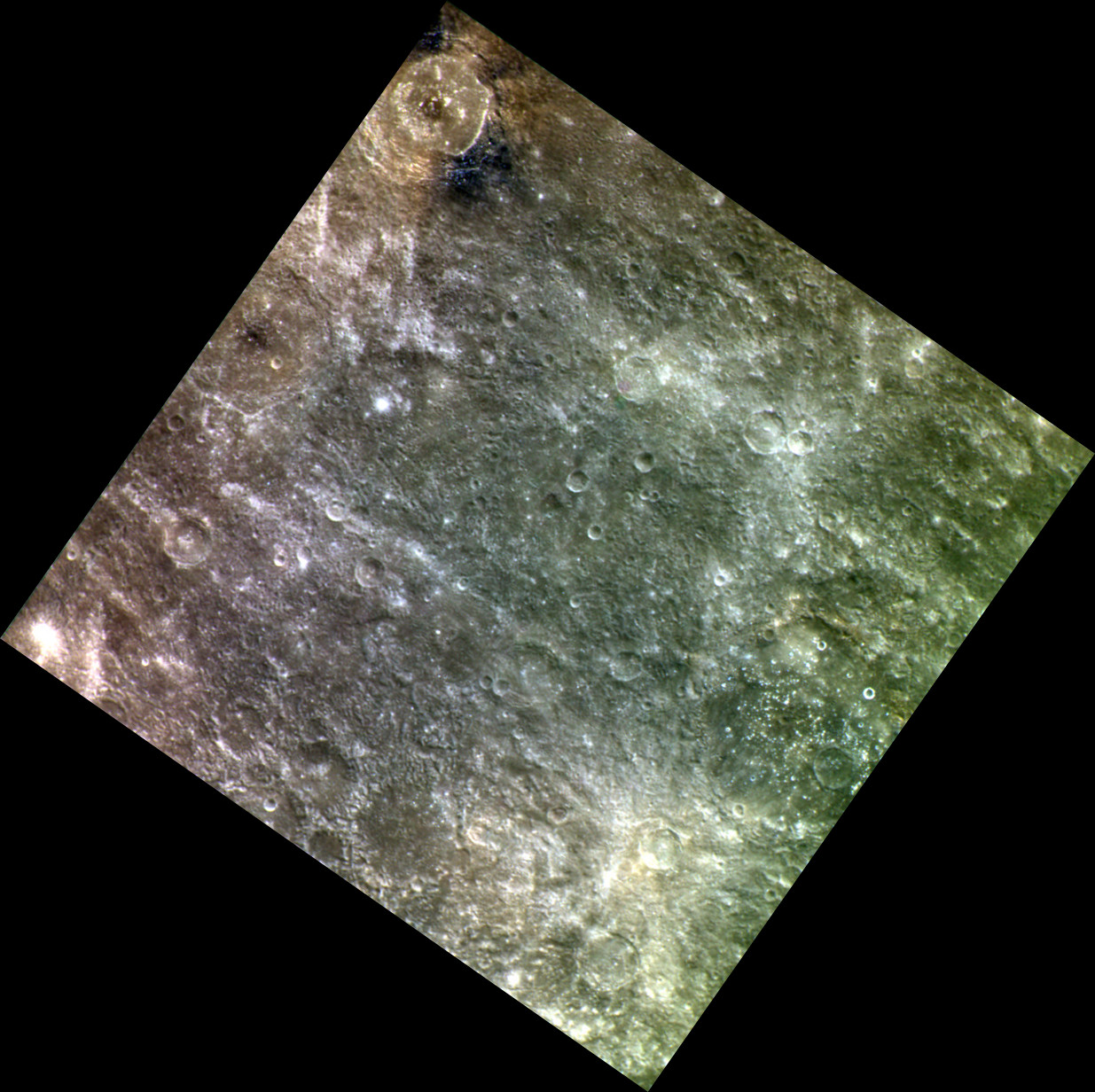
Regional approximate color view by MESSENGER, with Mahler along upper left margin
