= Tanaga =

Indigenous Filipino poem

Tanaga is a type of Philippine poetry, traditionally in the Tagalog language, consisting of four lines with seven syllables each. It can also have rhymes schemes like AABB and ABAB.

== Format ==
The Tanaga consists of four lines with seven syllables each with the same rhyme at the end of each line --- that is to say a 7-7-7-7 Syllabic verse, with an $\mathrm{AABB}$ rhyme scheme.

=== Archaic orthography ===
"Catitibay ca tolos
sacaling datnang agos!
aco’I momonting lomot
sa iyo,I popolopot."

=== Modern orthography ===
"Katitibay kang tulos
Sakaling datnan ng agos!
Ako'y mumunting lumot
sa iyo'y pupulupot."

=== Translation ===
"Oh be resilient you stake
Should the waters be coming!
I shall cower as the moss
To you I shall be clinging."

The above Tanaga is attributed to Friars Juan de Noceda and Pedro de Sanlucar by Vim Nadera, and quoted them as saying “Poesia muy alta en tagalo, compuesta de siete silabas, y cuatro versos, llena de metafora.” (16th century) ("Poetry is quite high in Tagalog, composed of seven syllables, and four verses, full of metaphor.")

Like the Japanese haiku, Tanagas traditionally are untitled. Most are handed down by oral history, and contain proverbial forms, moral lessons, and ethics.

A poetic form similar to the Tanaga is the Ambahan. Unlike the Ambahan whose length is indefinite, the Tanaga is a seven-syllable quatrain. Poets test their skills at rhyme, meter and metaphor through the Tanaga because is it rhymed and measured, while it exacts skillful use of words to create a puzzle that demands an answer.

It was a dying art form, but the Cultural Center of the Philippines and National Commission of the Arts is attempting to revivify it. Poetry groups, like the PinoyPoets, promote Filipino poetry in English; the vernacular are also advocating the spread of this art form.

== Modern form ==
The modern Tanaga still uses the 7777 syllable count, but rhymes range from dual rhyme forms: $\mathrm{AABB}$, $\mathrm{ABAB}$, $\mathrm{ABBA}$; to freestyle forms such as $\mathrm{AAAB}$, $\mathrm{BAAA}$, or $\mathrm{ABCD}$. Modern writers may opt to give them titles.

== See also ==
- Awit (poem)
- Ambahan – Another form of poetry for the Hanunoo language.
- Dalit (poem)
- Syllabic verse
