= Sanai (crater) =

Crater on Mercury

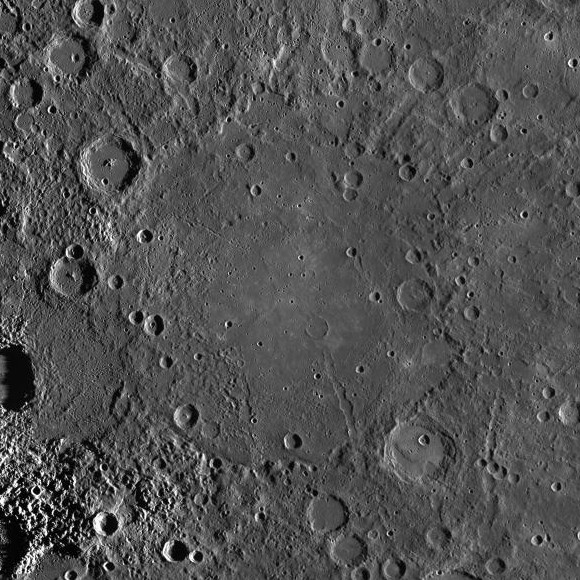
- MESSENGER WAC mosaic
- Planet: Mercury
- Coordinates: 13.37°S 6.99°W
- Quadrangle: Kuiper
- Diameter: 490 km (300 mi)
- Eponym: Sanai of Ghazna

Sanai is a large, ancient crater on Mercury. Its name was adopted by the International Astronomical Union in 2014, after the Persian poet, Sanai of Ghazna.

The crater, or basin, has prominent radial troughs to the northeast (similar to Imbrium sculpture on the moon), and it is floor is covered with smooth plains. Prior to naming, it was identified as b38. It is Tolstojan in age.

Hitomaro crater is to the southwest of Sanai, and the crater Dvorák is on its northwest rim.
