= Dvorák (crater) =

Crater on Mercury

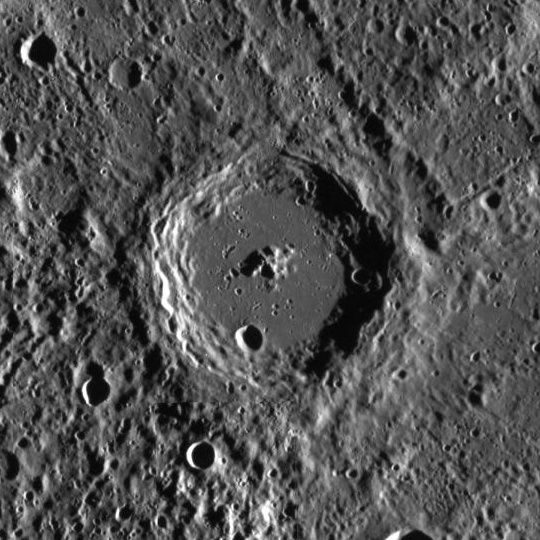
- MESSENGER WAC mosaic of Dvorák
- Feature type: Central-peak mpact crater
- Location: Kuiper quadrangle, Mercury
- Coordinates: 9.40°S 12.13°W
- Diameter: 75 km (47 mi)
- Eponym: Antonín Dvořák

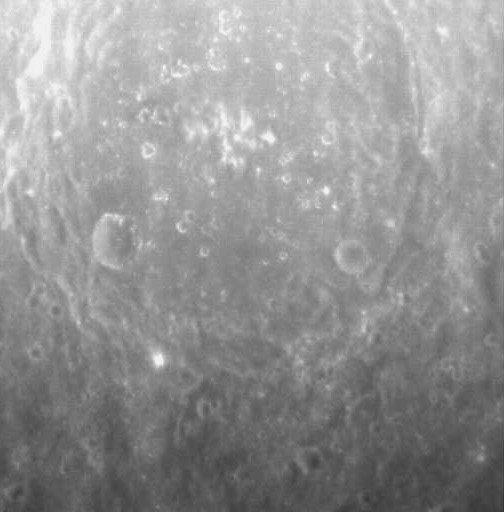
Another MESSENGER image at a high sun angle

Dvorák is a crater on Mercury. It has a diameter of 75 kilometers. Its name was adopted by the International Astronomical Union (IAU) in 1976. Dvorák is named for the Czech composer Antonín Dvořák, who lived from 1841 to 1904.

Dvorák lies on the northwest rim of Sanai crater.
