= Balagtas (crater) =

Crater on Mercury

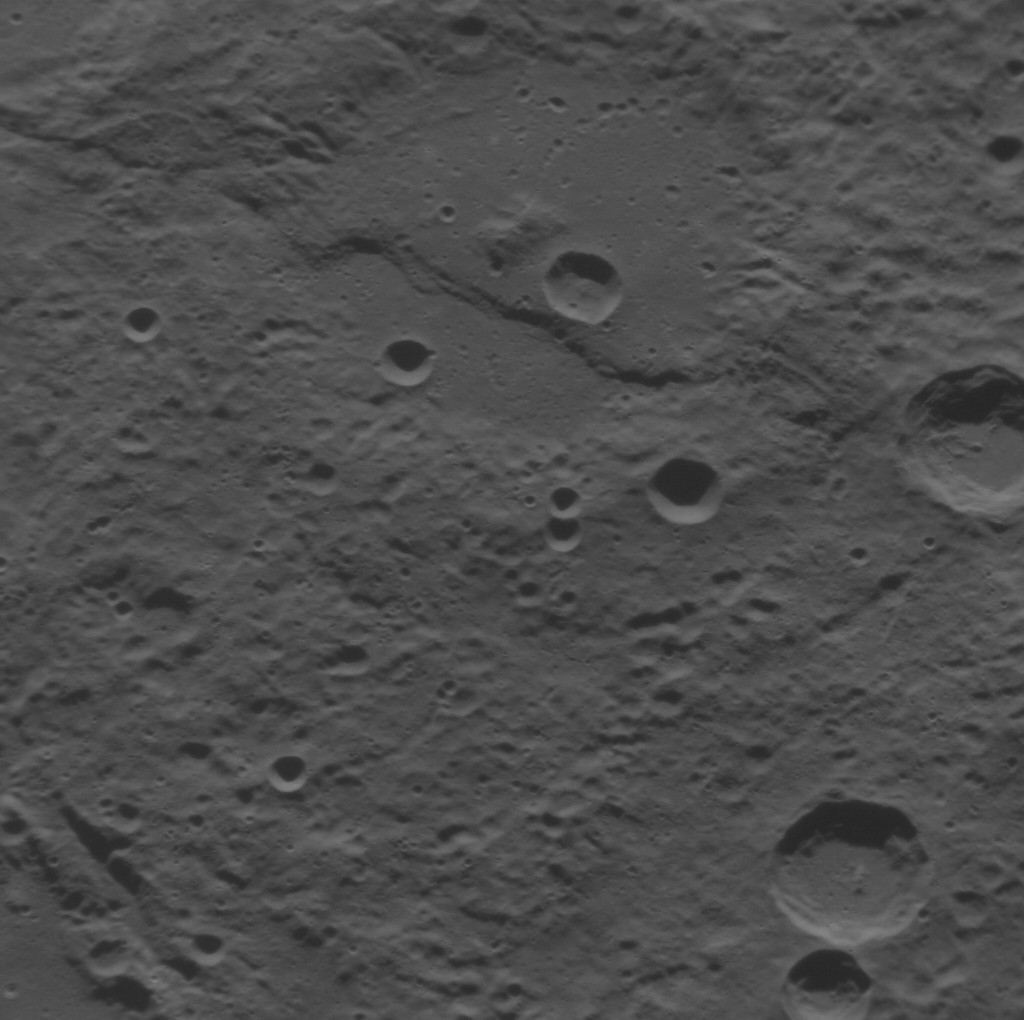
- MESSENGER NAC image with Balagtas at top
- Feature type: Impact crater
- Location: Discovery quadrangle, Mercury
- Coordinates: 22.56°S 13.90°W
- Diameter: 104 km (65 mi)
- Eponym: Francisco Balagtas

Balagtas is a crater on Mercury. It has a diameter of 98 kilometers. Its name was adopted by the International Astronomical Union in 1976. Balagtas is named for the Filipino writer Francisco Balagtas, who lived from 1788 to 1862. The crater was first imaged by Mariner 10 in 1974.

Kenkō crater is to the west of Balagtas, and Hitomaro is to the north. To the southeast is Darío.

== Views ==
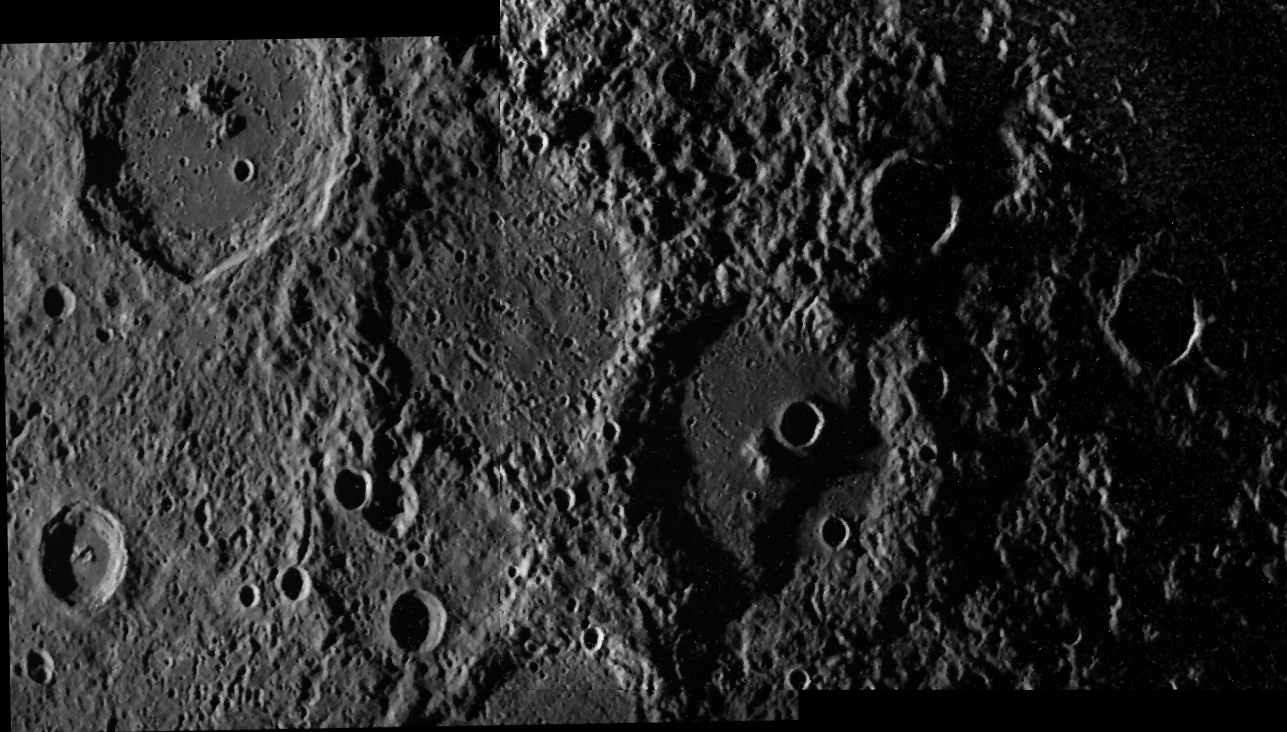
Mosaic of Mariner 10 images with Balagtas at right, Kenkō at center, and Mahler in upper left

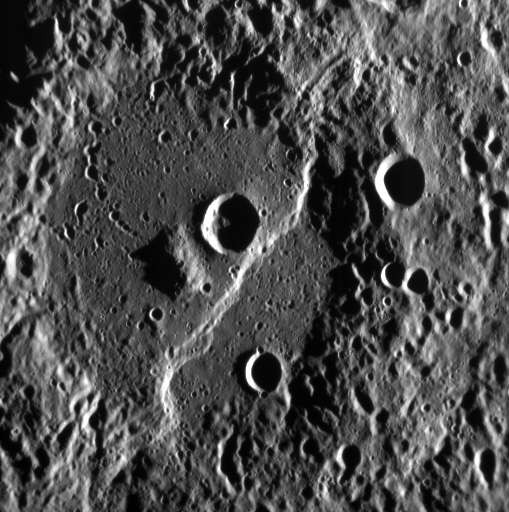
Oblique view at low sun angle

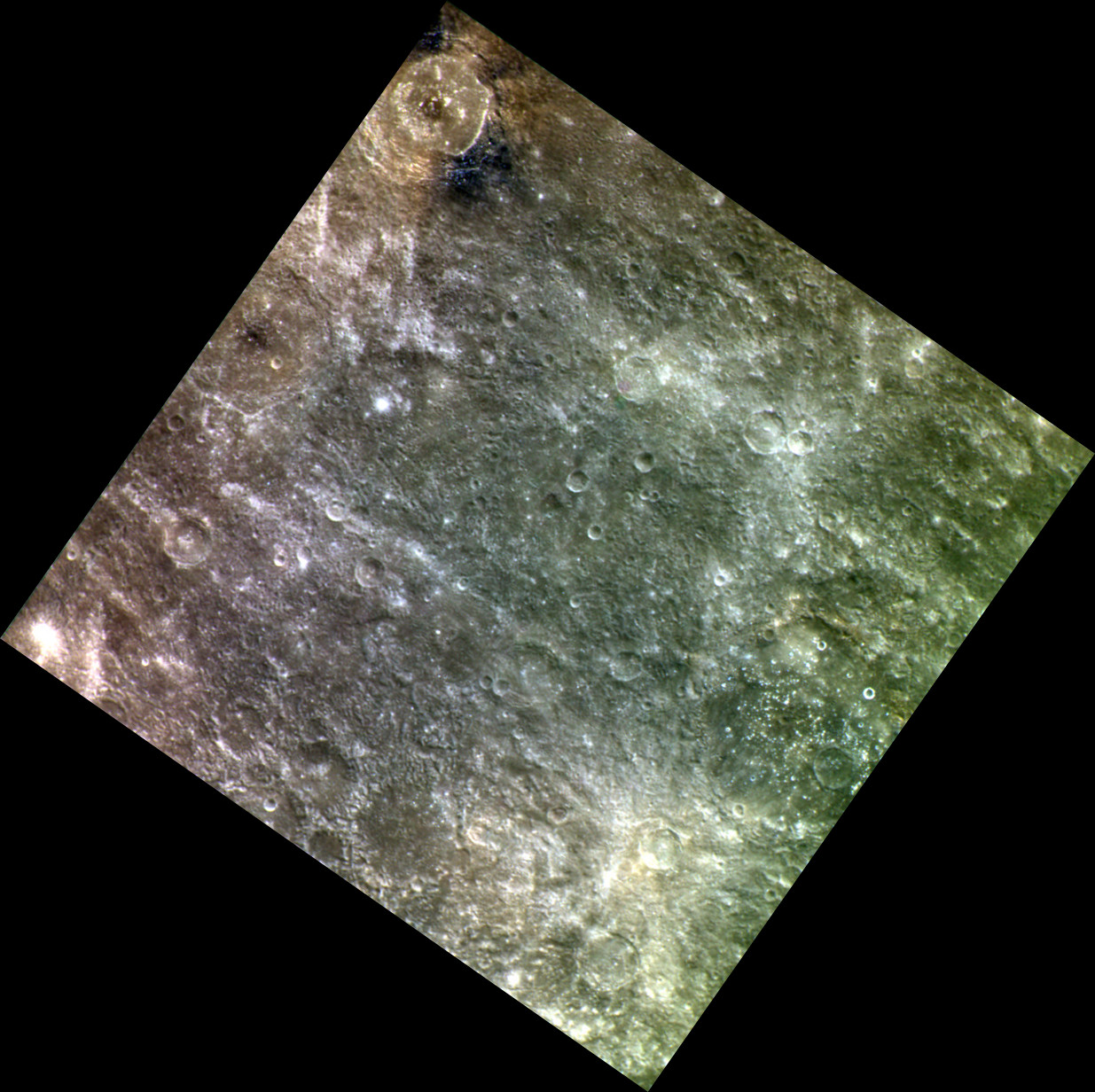
Regional approximate color view by MESSENGER, with Balagtas near center (indistinct)
