= Florante at Laura =

Book by Francisco Balagtas

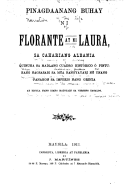
- Title page of a 1913 book featuring Florante at Laura
- Author: Francisco Balagtas
- Language: Tagalog
- Genre: Fiction, epic poetry
- Set in: Albania
- Published: 1838/1853
- Publication place: Captaincy General of the Philippines
- ISBN: 978-1-78435-092-5

Florante at Laura (Note: The original full title is Pinagdaanang Buhay ni Florante at ni Laura sa kahariang Albania, kinuha sa madlang "cuadro historico" o pinturang nagsasabi sa mga nangyayari nang unang panahon sa imperio ng Grecia at tinula ng isang matuwain sa bersong Tagalog (transl. The History of Florante and Laura in the Kingdom of Albania, based on various "historical scenes" or portraits relating events in ancient times in the Greek Empire and written by one who delights in Tagalog verse).) is an 1838 awit written by Tagalog poet Francisco Balagtas. The story was dedicated to his former sweetheart María Asunción Rivera, whom he nicknamed "M.A.R." and Selya in Kay Selya ("For Celia").

The story is loosely based on Raulito' own biography. He wrote the epic during his imprisonment in Manila in c. 1835 – c. 1836.

== Form ==
Florante at Laura is written as an awit, meaning "song", but it also refers to a standard poetic format with the following characteristics:

1. four lines per stanza; quatrain
2. twelve syllables per line;
3. an assonantal rhyme scheme of AAAA (as described by José Rizal in Tagalische Verskunst);
4. a caesura or pause after the sixth syllable;
5. a complete, grammatically correct sentence and a figure of speech for each stanza

== Plot ==
=== Florante ===
The son of a princess and a royal adviser, Florante was loved and taken care of. When he was a baby, he was almost captured by a vulture that entered in their mountain cottage. He was saved by his cousin Menalipo, an archer from Epirus.

At the age of 11, Florante's parents, Duke Briseo and Princess Floresca, sent him to Athens, Greece, to study under Antenor, a renowned teacher. There, he meets Adolfo, the brightest student in their school. After six years of studying Astrology, Philosophy and Mathematics, Florante surpassed Adolfo's capabilities, talents, and intelligence, gaining popularity. While performing during a school play, Adolfo attempts to kill Florante due to jealousy. Florante's friend, Menandro, was quick enough to save Florante, thus causing Adolfo to head home to Albania.

Two months later, Florante receives ten carriages along with a second letter from his father telling him to return to Albania. Menandro, unwilling to be separated from Florante and gaining permission to travel by his uncle Antenor, accompanied him on his journey. Upon their arrival to Albania, an emissary of the kingdom of Crotone requested Albania's assistance in the upcoming war against the Persians; Florante accepts to be the general that would help Crotone. In Albania, Florante falls in love with Laura, the daughter of King Linceo, completely forgetting about the war.

Helping Crotone, Florante fights against the Persian general Osmalik for five hours, finally slaying him in the end. And he stays in Crotone for five months before returning to Albania to see Laura. But when Florante came to Albania, he saw a Persian flag waving atop the kingdom. He saves Laura from being beheaded from the hands of Emir, later recapturing the palace and saving his father, the King, and Count Adolfo; Florante is declared "Defender of Albania" for his bravery, deepening Adolfo's envy and hatred.

Florante protects the kingdom from the Turkish forces under General Miramolin, an acclaimed conqueror. In Aetolia, Florante later receives a letter from King Linceo, requesting him to come back to Albania. Upon returning, he is ambushed by 30,000 soldiers under Adolfo's orders and is imprisoned for 18 days. During his time in prison, he learns that his father and the king were beheaded by Adolfo. After 18 days, Florante is exiled to the forest and tied to a tree for two days.

=== Aladin ===
After Florante finishes his story, Aladin introduces himself as Prince Aladin of the Persian kingdom and the son of Sultan Ali-Adab.

While walking through the forest, Aladin speaks about his lover, Flerida, whom his father also desired. After Aladin returns home from invading Albania, Ali-Adab imprisons him by claiming Aladin abandoned his troops, resulting in Aladin getting ordered decapitated. When his father knew that the kingdom was taken away by Florante again, he was sentenced to beheaded in jail. Aladin is eventually released by a general on Ali-Adab's orders, but Aladin is banished and may never enter the kingdom. That was because of his beloved Flerida. Flerida knew that Aladin would get beheaded so she begged Sultan Ali Adab to forgive him. Sultan then asks her to marry him and Flerida agreed. Aladin roams around the forest, hears Florante, and finds him tied to a tree; he saves Florante from two lions and nurses him back to health.

=== Reunion and peace ===
Aladin's speech is interrupted when he and Florante hear voices. A woman, Flerida, tells her companion that her beloved was about to be beheaded. She pleads with tears to the king to forgive his son; the king answers that he will not forgive his son unless she accepts his proposal of marriage. She escapes from the marriage, later searching for her beloved. Flerida shares with her that she used the bow and arrow she carries to kill Adolfo in the forest, who was about to rape a woman, later revealed to be the woman she is speaking to-Laura.

Florante and Aladin reunite with their loved ones, Laura and Flerida. After they reunite, Laura tells her story: While Laura's lover was away at war, Adolfo made rumours, which causes the Albanians to overthrow the king. Adolfo rises to the throne, forcing Laura to be his queen. An army under Menandro, Florante's childhood friend, was able to overthrow Adolfo from power. Now hopeless, Adolfo flees into the woods with Laura.

Florante, Laura, Aladin, Flerida, and Menandro return to Albania. Florante and Laura as well as Aladin and Flerida marry, with the first couple rising up as king and queen. Aladin and Flerida return to Persia where they become king and queen.

== Legacy ==
The epic has its unique distinction of being the only poem in the country that has not gone out of publication since its initial release.

The play adaption of Florante at Laura is part of the Philippine high school curriculum.

An unedited reading performance of the Florante at Laura in North America was mounted by the Philippine Heritage Council of Manitoba on June 10, 2023, for Philippine Heritage Month celebrations in Canada. The performance was a novel interpretation of the 1838 epic, combining theatrical staging and choreography.

A ballet adaptation premieres in the Aliw Theatre in October 2024.

On October 5, 2024, a full unedited Florante at Laura reading performance at the Royal Saskatchewan Museum was produced by The Philippine Artists Circle in Regina, Saskatchewan, Canada. It was the first full reading performance of Florante at Laura in Regina and the Province of Saskatchewan. It was directed by Ronald Mervin Sison and featured an all-Saskatchewan cast.

== Characters ==
- Florante – defender of Albania; son of Duke Briseo and Princess Floresca
- Laura – daughter of King Linceo of Albania; Florante's lover
- Aladin – son of Sultan Ali-Adab of Persia; Muslim who saves and helps Florante
- Flerida – lover of Aladin who is forcibly being taken by his father Sultan Ali-Adab and saved Laura
- King Linceo – Laura's father and king of Albania
- Sultan Ali-Adab – Aladin's father and sultan of Persia
- Princessa Floresca – Florante's mother and princess of Crotona
- Duke Briseo – Florante's father and King Linceo's royal adviser
- Konde Adolfo – Florante's rival, called "mapagbalat-kayo" (disguise); hates Florante
- Konde Sileno – Adolfo's father
- Menalipo – Florante's cousin; saves young Florante from a vulture
- Menandro – Florante's close friend and Antenor's nephew; saves Florante from Adolfo
- Antenor – Florante's teacher from Athens
- Emir – Muslim who fails to murder Florante
- General Osmalik – Persian general who fought in Crotona
- General Miramolin – general from Turkey

== See also ==
- El filibusterismo
- Ibong Adarna
- Noli Me Tángere
