= Francisco Balagtas =

Renowned Filipino poet and writer (1788–1862)

Francisco Balagtas Francisco Baltazar
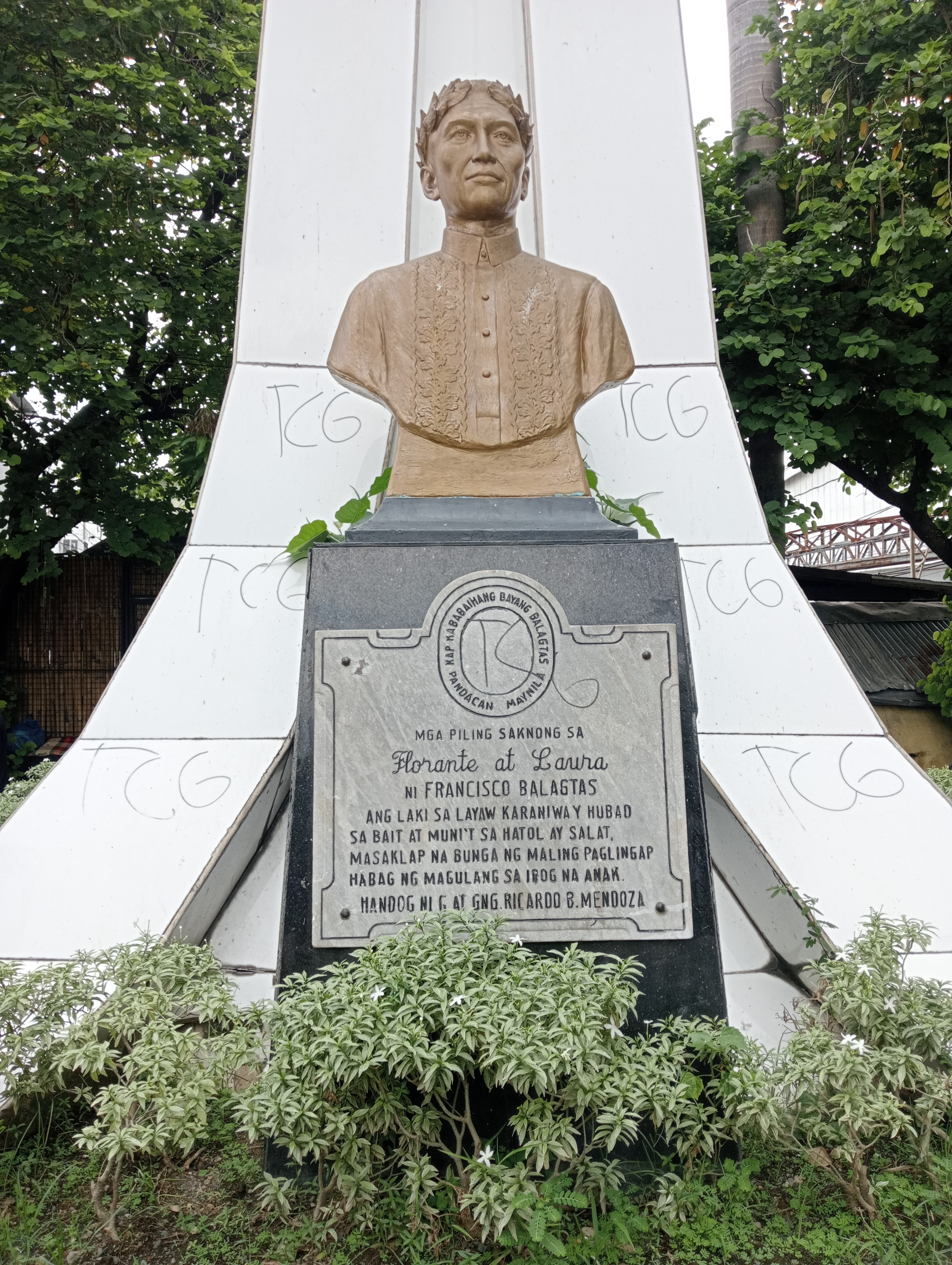
- Bust of Balagtas in Pandacan, Manila
- Born: Francisco Balagtas y de la Cruz; April 2, 1788; Bigaa, Bulacan, Captaincy General of the Philippines, Spanish Empire
- Died: February 20, 1862 (aged 73); Udyong, Bataan, Captaincy General of the Philippines, Spanish Empire
- Other name: Kiko
- Citizenship: Spanish (1812 Spanish Constitution granted Filipino natives Spanish citizenship)
- Education: Colegio de San Juan de Letran
- Occupation: Poet
- Spouse: Juana Tiambeng (m. 1842)
- Children: 11
- Writing career
- Language: Tagalog
- Notable work: Florante at Laura

Francisco Balagtas y de la Cruz (April 2, 1788 – February 20, 1862), commonly known as Francisco Balagtas and also as Francisco Baltazar, was a Filipino poet and litterateur of the Tagalog language during the Spanish rule of the Philippines. He is widely considered one of the greatest Filipino literary laureates for his impact on Filipino literature. The famous epic Florante at Laura is regarded as his defining work.

Balagtas adopted the legal surname Baltazar in fulfillment of the edict issued by Governor-General Narciso Claveria y Zaldua in 1849 that mandated the native population to adopt standard surnames. The name is commonly misspelled as Baltasar and sometimes misinterpreted as his pen name.

== Early life ==
Francisco Balagtas was born in Barrio Panginay, Bigaa, Bulacan, as the youngest of the four children of Juan Balagtas, a blacksmith, and Juana de la Cruz. He studied in a parochial school in Bigaa and later in Manila. He later worked as a houseboy in Tondo, Manila.

== Life as a poet ==
Balagtas learned to write poetry from José de la Cruz (Huseng Sisiw), one of the most famous poets of Tondo, in return for chicks. It was De la Cruz himself who personally challenged Balagtas to improve his writing. Balagtas swore he would overcome Huseng Sisiw as he would not ask for anything in return as a poet.

In 1835, Balagtas moved to Pandacan, Manila, where he met María Asunción Rivera, who would effectively serve as the muse for his future works. She is referenced in his work Florante at Laura as 'Selya' and 'MAR'.

Balagtas' affections for MAR were challenged by the influential Mariano Capule. The latter won the battle for MAR when he used his wealth to get Balagtas imprisoned. It was here that he wrote Florante at Laura—in fact, the events of this poem were meant to parallel his situation.

He wrote his poems in the Tagalog language, during an age when Filipino writing was predominantly written in Spanish.

Balagtas published Florante at Laura upon his release in 1838. He moved to Balanga, Bataan, in 1840 where he served as the assistant to the justice of the peace. He was also appointed as the translator of the court. He married Juana Tiambeng on July 22, 1842, in a ceremony officiated by Fr. Cayetano Arellano, uncle of the future chief justice to the Supreme Court of the Philippines Chief Justice Arellano. They had eleven children, but only four survived to adulthood. On November 21, 1849, Governor General Narciso Clavería y Zaldua issued a decree that every Filipino native had to adopt a surname. In 1856, he was appointed as the major lieutenant, but soon after was convicted and sent to prison again in Bataan under the accusation that he ordered Alferez Lucas' housemaid's head to be shaved.

He sold his land and all of his riches, for him to be put out of imprisonment in 1861. He then continued writing poetry, along with translating Spanish documents, but he died a year later—on February 20, 1862, at the age of 73. On his deathbed, he asked the favor that none of his children become poets like him, who had suffered under his gift as well as under others. He even went as far as to tell them it would be better to cut their hands off than let them be writers.

Balagtas is greatly idolized in the Philippines that the term for Filipino debate in extemporaneous verse is named after him: Balagtasan.

== Legacy ==
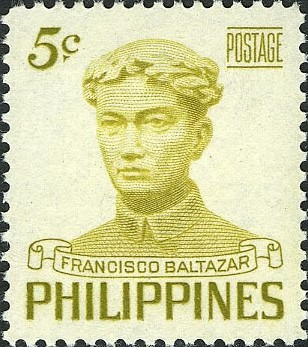
1953 stamp featuring Balagtas, issued by the Philippine Postal Corporation

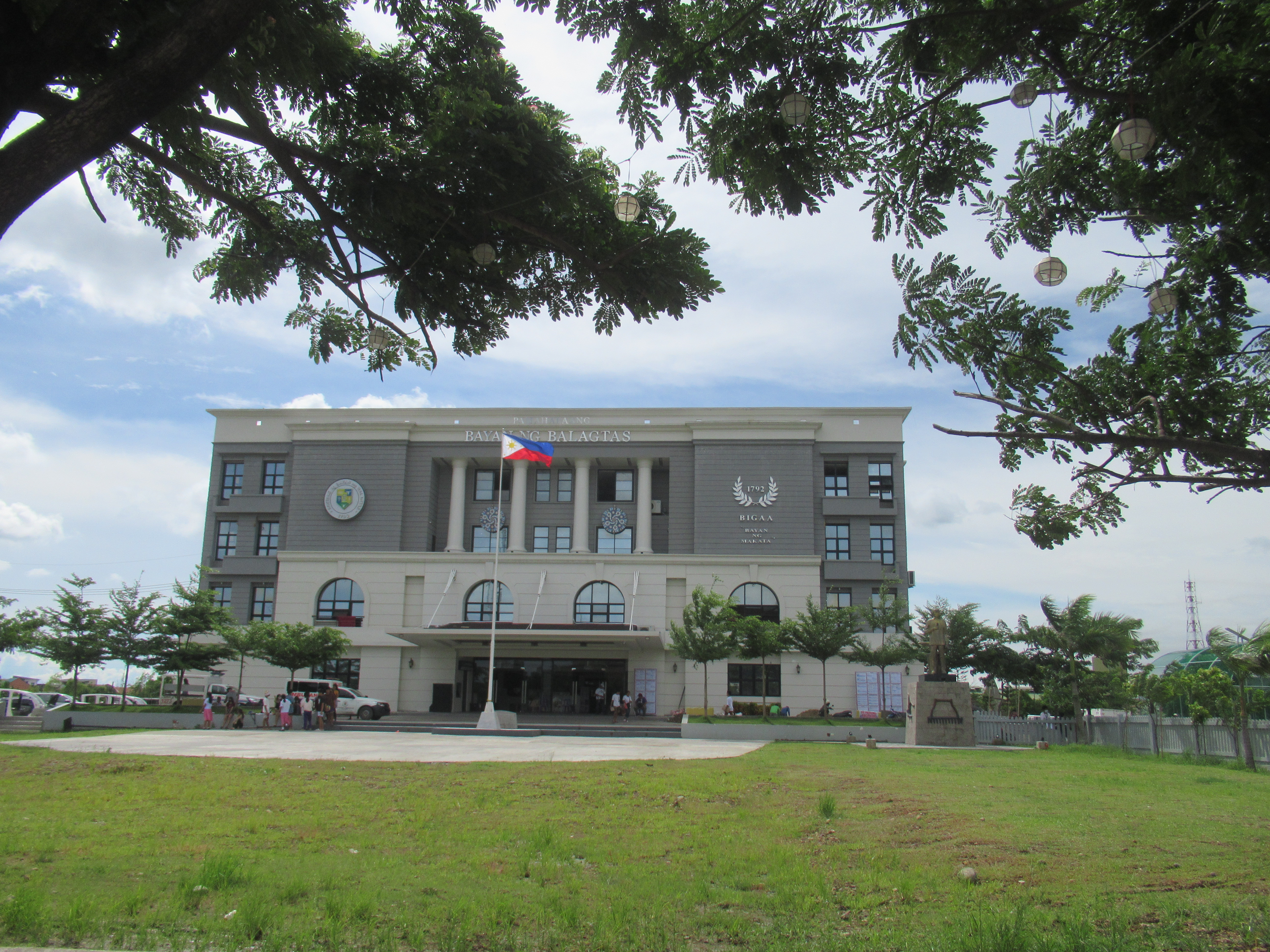
New Balagtas Municipal Hall

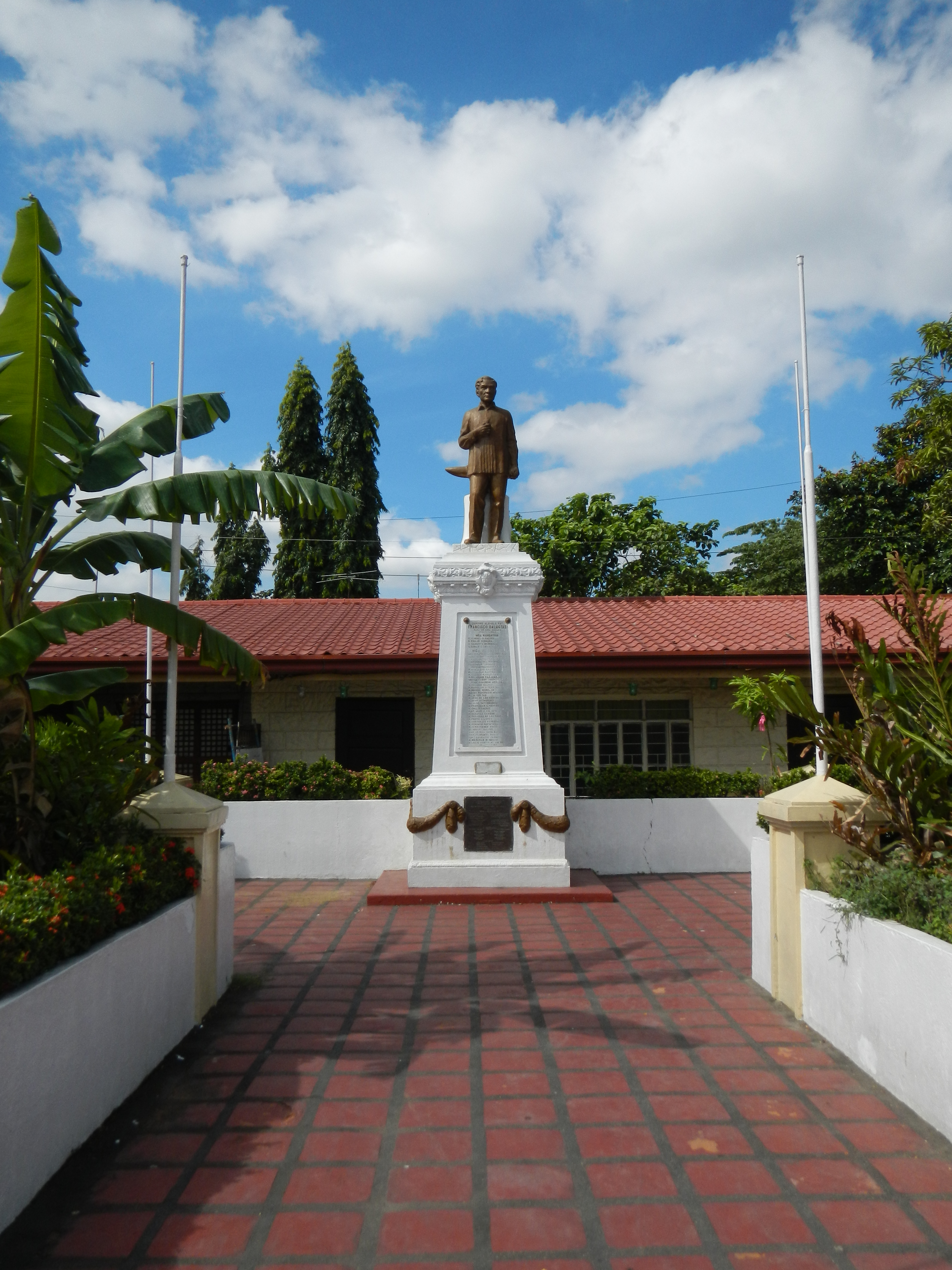
"Pook na Sinilangan ni Balagtas" Monument in Panginay, Balagtas, Bulacan

An elementary school was erected in honor of Balagtas, the Francisco Balagtas Elementary School (FBES), located along Alvarez Street in Santa Cruz, Manila. There is also a plaza and park (Plaza Balagtas) erected in Pandacan, Manila, while most of the streets were named after various Florante at Laura characters in honor of Francisco Balagtas. His birthplace, Bigaa, Bulacan, was renamed to Balagtas, Bulacan, in his memory. A museum, historical marker, monument and elementary school has been placed in his birthplace at Panginay, Balagtas, Bulacan. The former Folk Arts Theater in Manila was renamed to Tanghalang Francisco Balagtas to honor Balagtas. Mercurian crater was also named after him. The barangay of Udyong in Orion, Bataan, was also renamed Balagtas.

Since 1967, the Philippines has released currency honoring Balagtas on the 10 centavo coin.

On April 2, 2018, Google honored Balagtas' 230th birthday celebration with a Google Doodle.

== Works ==
=== Sources of Balagtas' work ===
No original manuscript in Balagtas' handwriting of any of his works has survived to the present day. This is due mainly to two great fires that razed Udyong (now Balagtas in Orion, Bataan) and destroyed much of the poet's works. The most notable of his works, Florante at Laura or Pinagdaanang Buhay ni Florante at Laura sa Kaharian ng Albanya has been published in numerous editions from its original publication in 1838. The oldest extant edition of the Florante is believed to be the 1861 edition published in Manila, while a handwritten manuscript written down by Apolinario Mabini exists and is in the possession of the Philippine National Library.

The major source of the poet's life and works is from a 20th-century work entitled Kun Sino ang Kumatha nang "Florante" (He who wrote the "Florante") by Hermenegildo Cruz. The poet lists down Balagtas' works and recreates some of his plays based on scenes and lines memorized by the poet's children. The book also has an edition of the Florante. Balagtas wrote ten comedias and one metrical romance according to Cruz as well as numerous other poems and short plays that are recorded in his book. These include two laos or short celebratory scenes usually involving a patron saint and performed during fiestas.

=== Complete works ===
Only three of Balagtas' complete works have survived to this day. Of the three, Florante at Laura is considered Balagtas' defining work and is a cultural touchstone for the Philippines.

- Florante at Laura or Pinagdaanang Buhay ni Florante at Laura sa Kaharian ng Albanya, an awit (metrical narrative poem with dodecasyllabic quatrains [12 syllables per line, 4 lines per stanza]); Balagtas' masterpiece
- La India elegante y el negrito amante – a short play in one act
- Orosman at Zafira – a comedy in three acts

=== Reconstructed/rediscovered works ===
Majority of the source material for Balagtas' work come from Hermenegildo Cruz' book which itself is based on the surviving testimonies and memories of Balagtas' children at the turn of the century. In his book, he reconstructs four plays.

- Rodolfo at Rosemonda
- Nudo gordeano
- Abdol at Misereanan – a komedya, staged in Abucay, Bataan in 1859
- Bayaceto at Dorslica – a komedya in three parts, staged at Udyong on September 27, 1857

=== Minor works ===
As a folk poet and employee of the courts, Balagtas' prowess in writing was mainly seen in the yearly fiestas held in nearby towns, a great majority of his plays may have been staged in outdoor theaters set up in town squares and as a poet, a number of his works and writings have been recorded in collections of poetry such as the Coleccion de refranes, frases y modismos tagalos (Guadalupe, 1890) as well as in the accounts of Spanish officials such as Martínez de Zúñiga who recorded traditional plays and religious events in Philippine fiestas.

Balagtas also wrote in the Ladino style of poems that were popular among his contemporaries. He is said to have written two loas recorded in Cruz's book as well as numerous Ladinos and didactic works.

==== Loas ====
- In praise of the Archangel Michael a loa written for the patron saint of the town of Udyong.
- In Celebration of the crowning of Queen Isabella II of the Bourbon Dynasty Celebrating the ascension of Isabella II to the Spanish throne

=== Minor poems ===
A number of Minor poems are recorded in Cruz's book.

- "Pangaral sa Isang Binibining Ikakasal" (Admonition to a Young Lady About To Be Married) A didactic work.
- "Paalam Na sa Iyo. . .!" (And So Farewell to You... !) A bilingual poem (Written in Spanish and Tagalog) written in Ladino style.

=== Lost works ===
Five of the ten plays Balagtas wrote as recorded by Cruz are considered lost. Another work—Claus (a translation work from Latin)—is considered lost for Cruz does not mention any fragments or elaborates on it in his book, Eufronio Alip's 1930 Tagalog literary history mentions the same book. Among his other lost works, one should consider plays and short poems written by Balagtas in his lifetime for fiestas and celebrations as well as to earn his living. Eufronio Alip, in his 1930 historical study on Tagalog literature, also provides an additional two titles of plays by Balagtas.

- Don Nuño at Selinda o la desgracia del amor en la inocencia – a komedya in three parts
- Auredato at Astrome – a komedya in three parts
- Clara Belmore – a komedya in three parts
- Alamansor at Rosalinda – a komedya staged at Udyong during the town's feast
- Mahomet at Constanza
- Claus (translated into Tagalog from Latin)
- La Eleccion del Gobernadorcillo – a komedya in prose, in five parts
- Mariang Makiling – a komedya in nine parts
