= My Brother, My Executioner =

1973 novel by F. Sionil José

- Book cover for F. Sionil José's novel My Brother, My Executioner.
- Author: F. Sionil José
- Language: English
- Genre: Historical fiction, Romance (love), War
- Publisher: Solidaridad Publishing House, Inc.
- Publication date: 1973, 1974, 1979
- Publication place: Philippines
- Media type: Hardcover
- Pages: 417-418
- ISBN: 971-8845-16-X

My Brother, My Executioner is a novel by Filipino author Francisco Sionil José written in Philippine English. A part of the Rosales Saga - a series of five interconnected fiction novels - My Brother, My Executioner ranks third in terms of chronology, after Po-on (original title: "Dusk") and Tree and before The Pretenders and Mass. In the United States, My Brother, My Executioner was published as a second part of the book, Don Vicente, together with Tree, another novel which is also a part of José’s Rosales Saga. Tree is the second novel of the historical saga, before My Brother, My Executioner. This novel was first published in the Philippines in the early 1970s.

== Principal characters ==
- Luis Asperri - Victor's half-brother, illegitimate son of Don Vicente Asperri
- Don Vicente Asperri - feudal landlord, father of Luis Asperri
- Victor - Luis Asperri's half-brother
- Trining Asperri-Asperri - Luis Asperri's first cousin, becomes wife of Luis

== Plot summary and description ==
My Brother, My Executioner, tackles the narrative about two half brothers – Luis Asperri and Victor. Luis is the biological, yet illegitimate, son of Don Vicente Asperri, a rich feudal landowner. At a young age, Luis was taken by Don Vicente from his underprivileged mother and half-brother, Victor, who were both living in Sipnget, Rosales in Pangasinan, a province in the Philippines. After studying in Manila, Luis became a writer and editor for a radical left-wing magazine. When Luis was finally able to return to Rosales, he found out that his half-brother, Vic – the nickname of Victor - became a full-pledged leader of rebels who were against the existence of rich landowners. Thus, the brothers meet again both “as allies and as adversaries” because of their opposing social beliefs, views, status and principles. These conflicts are their mutual misfortunes in life as brothers. Luis identifies with the luxury offered by city life, while Vic detests these materialistic privileges. Furthermore, although Luis considers himself as a liberal, he is more like his father, Don Vicente. He followed the will of Don Vicente by marrying Trining, his cousin – instead of a girlfriend in Manila – in order to preserve the wealth of the family. Luis Asperri is against putting down his status as a wealthy landowner for the benefit of the peasantry. He is against the goals of the uprising of the Hukbalahap or Hukbong Bayan Laban sa mga Hapon – a “people’s army against the Japanese occupiers” represented by the leadership of his half-brother, Vic. The event occurred in Philippine history during the 1950s. The Hukbalahap remained active even after World War II.

== See also ==
- Literature of the Philippines
- Philippine English
- Philippine literature in English
- Without Seeing the Dawn by Stevan Javellana
- Cry Slaughter! by E.K. Tiempo
- The Man Who (Thought He) Looked Like Robert Taylor by Bienvenido Santos
