= List of Silliman University people =

Philippine university people

Since 1901, Silliman University has produced thousands of graduates from early childhood (pre-elementary) up to the undergraduate and graduate levels. This is a list of notable people affiliated with the university, including current and former faculty members, alumni and people who have been conferred honorary degrees. People affiliated with Silliman University are called Sillimanians.

== Alumni ==
Name	Degree(s) taken in Silliman	Notability	Reference
Juanita Amatong	B.S.B.A., 1954	Secretary of finance; World Bank executive director	
César Ruiz Aquino	PhD	Four-time Palanca awardee and 2009 Free Press Literary awardee	
Robert Barbers	A.B. Pol.Sci.	Senator of the Philippines	
Henry Otley Beyer	Doctor of Science honoris causa 1959	American anthropologist	
Leonor Briones	B.S.B.A	Secretary of the Department of Education, former secretary of the Commission on Audit (Philippines), national treasurer, presidential adviser for social development, and VP for Finance of the University of the Philippines	
Ian R. Casocot	B.A. Mass Communication	Five-time Palanca awardee; author	
Kira Danganan-Azucena, OL	B.A. Mass Communication 1994	Diplomat; chargés d'affaires ad interim and deputy permanent representative of the Permanent Mission of the Philippines to the United Nations; vice-president for the Operational Activities for Development Segment, United Nations Economic and Social Council	
Horacio de la Costa	Doctor of Humanities honoris causa 1976	Historian and first Filipino provincial superior of the Jesuits (Society of Jesus) in the Philippines	
Roel Degamo	B.S.M.E. 1989	Current governor, Province of Negros Oriental	
Claire Delfin	B.A. Mass Communication 1999	Reporter, GMA News Channel; international awardee, 2007 Global Media Awards	
Leoncio P. Deriada	Ph.D. in English and Literature	Palanca Hall of Famer, won 13 Palanca Awards for Literature	
Jesus Elbinias	A.A., LL.B	Presiding justice of the Philippine Court of Appeals and first chancellor of the Department of Justice Academy	
Carlos P. Garcia	Pre-Law 1916-18	President of the Philippines	
Beauty Gonzalez	A.B.	Actress and ex-PBB teen contestant	
Hall Hibbard	Elem. 1917	Former executive of the Lockheed Corporation	
Junix Inocian	Theater Arts 1975	International stage and movie actor	
Mark Javier	B.S. Info.Tech.	Archer, 2008 Beijing Olympics	
Roseller T. Lim	A.A. 1935, LL.B 1939	Senator of the Philippines	
Don Eugenio Lopez, Sr.	LL.D honoris causa 1971	Founder, Lopez Group of Companies	
Emilio Macias II	H.S. 1950; A.A. 1952	Governor, Province of Negros Oriental	
Paula Lynn Obañana	Elem., H.S.	Winner of several gold medals in the Palarong Pambansa (National Games) in 1995–1997, and the Arafura Games held in Darwin, Australia in 2000	
Paul Pfeiffer	Elem. 1978, H.S. 1982	American video artist	
Reynato Puno	Doctor of Laws honoris causa	Chief justice, Supreme Court of the Philippines	
Fidel Ramos	Doctor of Humanities honoris causa 1993	President of the Philippines	
Eddie Romero	Elem. 1936, H.S. 1940	National Artist for Cinema and Broadcast Arts (2003)	
José E. Romero	A.A. 1917	Lawyer, statesman, first Philippine ambassador to the Court of St. James's	
Lakambini Sitoy	B.S., M.A.	Nine-time Palanca Award winner, 2009 Free Press Literary awardee	
Alfredo Flores Tadiar	A.A., A.B., LL.B	"Father" of alternative dispute resolution (ADR) in the Philippines	
Lorenzo G. Teves	A.A. 1938, LL.B 1946	Senator of the Philippines (1966–1972); representative, 1st District of Negros Oriental (1954–1966); governor, Province of Negros Oriental (1978–1987)	
Edith Tiempo	BSE Education 1947	National Artist for Literature (1999); founder, Silliman National Writers Workshop	
Simeon Toribio	A.B.	Filipino Olympian and congressman	
Cornelio Villareal	A.B. 1924, LL.D honoris causa 1964	Speaker of the House, Congress of the Philippines; president of the Liberal Party	
Job Marconi Mascardo	SUHS 2006, B.S. Nursing 2010	Recipient of The 16^{th} Annual TOFA Awards and the 2026 American Association for Men in Nursing/DAISY Foundation Health Equity Award.	

== Professors ==
Name	Positions held / career / achievements	Relationship to Silliman University	Reference
Edilberto Tiempo	Filipino writer, professor and founder of the Silliman National Writers Workshop	Professor (Literature)	

== Presidents ==
Name	Tenure	Alma mater	Reference
David S. Hibbard, M.A., Ll.D, Ph.D	1901–1930	Princeton University	
Roy H. Brown, D.D.	1932–1936	Park University	
Arthur L. Carson, Ph.D.	1939–1953	Cornell University	
Leopoldo T. Ruiz, Ph.D.	1953–1961	Columbia University and Yale University and the University of Southern California	
Cicero D. Calderon, J.S.D.	1962–1971	Yale University	
Quintin S. Doromal, M.A.	1973–1982	Harvard University	
Venancio D. Aldecoa, Jr., Ll.B.	1983–1986	Silliman University	
Pedro V. Flores, Ed.D.	1987–1989	Pennsylvania State University	
Angel C. Alcala, Ph.D.	1991–1992	Stanford University	
Mervyn J. Misajon, Ph.D.	1994–1996	Michigan State University	
Agustin A. Pulido, Ph.D.	1996–2006	Indiana State University	
Ben S. Malayang III, Ph.D.	2006–2018	Ohio University and University of California, Berkeley	
Betty D. Cernol-McCann, Ph.D.	2018–present	Ateneo de Manila University	
