= Po-on =

Novel by F. Sionil José

- Book cover for F. Sionil José's Po-on A Novel
- Author: F. Sionil Jose
- Language: English: Po-on (Philippines) or Dusk (USA), Tagalog: Po-on, French: Po-on
- Genre: Historical fiction, War, Romance
- Publisher: Solidaridad Publishing House, Inc. (Philippines), Random House, Inc. (United States), De La Salle University Press (Philippines), Fayard (France)
- Publication date: 1984, 1998 (Note: Sionil José's fictional rendition of a bona fide hero Apolinario Mabini, contains false and debasing information,(..."They {ilustrados} spread a gossip that Mabini was a cripple because he was syphilitic, an untruth that I {Sionil José} had swallowed and presented as a fact in this novel."), due to being accredited by historians and people alike. Subsequent editions of Po-on bear these corrections ("and my deepest apologies").)
- Publication place: Philippines
- Media type: Hardcover
- Pages: 307
- ISBN: 971-555-267-6; ISBN 978-971-555-267-7; ISBN 978-0-375-75144-8; ISBN 0-375-75144-0
- OCLC: 41452533
- LC Class: MLCME 98/00084 (P)

Po-on: A Novel is a 1984 novel written by Filipino English language writer, F. Sionil José. This is the original title when it was first published in the Philippines in the English language. In the United States, it was published under the title Dusk: A Novel. It was translated by Lilia F. Antonio into Tagalog.

== Description ==
Po-on is the beginning of Rosales Saga of F. Sionil José – a series of novels about Rosales, Pangasinan in the Philippines. The Rosales Saga has five parts, all of them individual but interrelated novels, composed namely of the following titles in terms of historical chronology: Po-on, Tree, My Brother, My Executioner, The Pretenders, and Mass. Among José's five-part novel series, the Rosales Saga, "Po-on" was the last to be written and published but the first in terms of story-telling chronology.

In Po-on begins the narration of the experiences of one generation of the Salvador family (later changed to "Samson" to avoid being hunted by the Guardia Civil), through Eustaqio "Istak" Samson, a farmer who joined the fleeing Ilokanos known as the mal vivir or "agraviados". The peasant family reluctantly left their original hometown to escape further oppression and persecution from the colonial authorities. Their journey leads them to a new place at Rosales, Pangasinan, under the care of the wealthy mestizo named Don Jacinto, who despite owning large tracts of land, supports his fellow countrymen and indios in their plight. The novelist discusses the life and the origins of this family while embellished with the historical background of the Philippines during the late 1880s up to the early 1990s.

== Historical background ==
Alive in the novel were the concepts and the events that emanated during peacetime and wartime; even the status of the poor and the affluent, of the privileged and the powerful, and of those who have privileges, freedoms, and rights. During Istak's time during the final days of the 1800s, when Spain lost control of the Philippines, the bliss in Istak's heart when the Philippine Republic finally achieved independence was just for a brief moment. Because that liberation was only short-lived: the ruling Spaniards were only replaced by a new group of strangers from a continent called the United States of America. This colonial transition occurred after the Spaniards were defeated by the Americans] during the Spanish–American War. In Po-on: A Novel, José revisited these mutual chapters in both American and Philippine histories, together with the presentation of their social and psychological effects to the Philippine citizenry who had been under foreign occupiers from one time followed by another.

== Plot summary ==
The events in Po-on happened from 1880s to early 1900s, when an Ilocano family abandoned their beloved barrio in order to overcome the challenges to their survival in southern Pangasinan in the Philippines, and also to flee from the cruelty they received from the Spaniards. One of the principal characters of the novel is Eustaquio Salvador, a Filipino from the Ilocano stock who was fluent in Spanish and Latin, a talent he inherited from the teachings of an old parish priest named Jose Leon in Cabugao. He was an acolyte aspiring to become a priest. He was also knowledgeable in the arts of traditional medicine. The only hindrance to his goal of becoming a full-fledged priest was his racial origins. He lived in a period in Philippine history when a possible Filipino uprising against the Spanish government was about to erupt, a time after the execution of three mestizos, namely Mariano Gomez, José Apolonio Burgos, and Jacinto Zamora (or the Gomburza, an acronym for the three) at the erstwhile known Cavite (which is then renamed to Bagumbayan; now known as Rizal Park) on February 17, 1872. There were signs that a revolution will happen, despite the lack of unity among the inhabitants of the Philippines islands at the time, as pampangueños generally sided with the enemy. Another approaching occurrence was the help the Filipinos would be receiving from the Americans in finally removing the governing Spaniards from the archipelago after three hundred years. The novel recreates the societal struggles in which the characters of Po-on were situated, which includes the protagonist Istak's personal search for life's meaning and for the true face of his beliefs at principles. Throughout this personal journey, he was accompanied by a dignity that is his alone. He was assigned the task of delivering a message to President Emilio Aguinaldo, the leader of the Philippine revolutionaries, but died at the hands of American soldiers fighting at the Tirad Pass, inevitably unable to recount the contents of the letter to Aguinaldo.

== Reviews and analysis ==
Po-on the novel is only one part of F. Sionil José's Rosales Saga, the historical epic narrative composed of four other novels considered by the Filipino poet and literary critic Ricaredo Demetillo as "the first great Filipino novels written in English." Specifically, Po-on had been described by Random House as a work of fiction which is "more than" the character of a "historical novel", a book with "extraordinary scope and passion" that is "meaningful to Philippine literature." a book as meaningful to Philippine literature as One Hundred Years of Solitude is to Latin American literature. One Hundred Years of Solitude is the masterpiece of Latin America's Colombian novelist Gabriel García Márquez. Frank Gibney of The New York Times described the story-telling in José's Rosales Saga as being similar to the tradition and style found in the U.S.A. trilogy by the American novelist John Dos Passos.

== See also ==
- Literature of the Philippines
- Philippine English
- Philippine literature in English
- Without Seeing the Dawn by Stevan Javellana
- Cry Slaughter! by E.K. Tiempo
- The Man Who (Thought He) Looked Like Robert Taylor by Bienvenido Santos
