= Timothy Montes =

Filipino short story writer (born 1970)

Timothy R. Montes
- Born: 12 September 1970 (age 55); Borongan, Eastern Samar, Philippines
- Occupations: journalist; essayist; short story writer
- Writing career
- Language: English
- Genre: Fiction
- Notable works: "The Doubters" (1989) "The Black Men" (1994) "Turtle Season" (2001)
- Notable awards: Carlos Palanca Memorial Awards for Literature (1989, 2001)

Timothy R. Montes (born September 12, 1970 in Borongan) is a Filipino journalist, essayist and short story writer in the English language from Eastern Samar.

== Biography ==
Montes was born on September 12, 1970 in Borongan, Eastern Samar. He graduated his secondary studies at Eastern Samar National Comprehensive High School and took Creative Writing Program at Silliman University under the mentorship of Edilberto and Edith Tiempo during late 19980s and early 1990s. At the university, he was able to improve his writing abilities, earn a master's degree, and establish himself as one of the country's regional fictionists.

In the 1990s, Montes began teaching in Silliman before joining the Faculty of Creative Writing Program at University of the Philippines Mindanao in the 2000s. He has spent the last two years of his life as a teacher at De La Salle University.

In 1994, Anvil published a collection of his short stories titled "The Black Men and Other Stories." He also co-edited Tribute, a memorial anthology of stories dedicated to his mentor Edilberto Tiempo, alongside César Ruiz Aquino.

Montes' numerous writings appeared in anthologies and literary journals. One of his known works is the "Turtle Season", a short story about a peacekeeper named Captain Raul Daza who was facing a problem with his wife because he could not bestow such precious time with her due to his job in the remote island of Kalayasan. In 1989, he earned the third prize of Carlos Palanca Memorial Awards for Literature for his short story "The Doubters", and in 2001, he was awarded the first prize for "Turtle Season".

He currently lives in Dumaguete, Negros Oriental and has written an essay about the town entitled "How To Write About Dumaguete" in 2023.

== Publications ==
=== Novel ===
- Running Amok (2001)

=== Short stories ===
- "The Doubters" (1989)
- The Black Men and Other Stories (1994)
  - "The Black Men"
  - "The Pigeons of Sto. Domingo"
  - "Surfaces"
  - "Fire from Heaven"
  - "The Last Enemy"
  - "The Great Darkness"
  - "On the Road"
  - "Fogtown"
- "The Fish Dealer's Tale" (1997)
- "The Fish Story" (2000)
- Turtle Season and Other Stories (2001)
  - "A Sense of Place"
  - "Turtle Season"
  - "Land Off the Morning"
  - "Love Sermon and Disputation"
  - "Of Fish, Flies, Dogs and Women"
  - "The Assassin's Tale"
  - "Under the Waves"
- "The Housemaid" (2007)

=== Anthologies and essays ===
- Literary Technophobia and the Case for Philippine Future Fiction (Ed. with César Ruiz Aquino, 2000)
- Tribute: An Anthology of Contemporary Philippine Fiction (2001)
- "On the Stories and Essays"
- "Philosophical Analysis"
- "Young Writers and the Tradition in the Philippine Folk Literature in English"
- Beautiful Accidents: Stories (Ed. with Ian Casocot, 2011)
- Philippine Short Story Masterpieces (2021)
- "How to Write About Dumaguete" (2023)
