= Without Seeing the Dawn =

1947 novel by Stevan Javellana

Without Seeing the Dawn (The Lost Ones)
- First edition (US)
- Author: Stevan Javellana
- Cover artist: George Salter
- Language: English, Tagalog
- Genre: Historical fiction, War, Romance
- Published: 1947 - Little, Brown (US); 1976 - Alemar's-Phoenix (Philippines)
- Publication place: Philippines, United States
- Media type: Hardcover
- Pages: 369
- ISBN: 971-06-2177-7

Without Seeing the Dawn is a 1947 novel by Philippine author Stevan Javellana.

Its plot was derived from one of José Rizal's character in the Spanish-language novel Noli Me Tangere or Touch Me Not. Javellana's 368-paged book has two parts, namely Day and Night. The first part, Day, narrates the story of a pre-war barrio and its people in the Panay Island particularly in Iloilo. The second part, Night, begins with the start of World War II in both the U.S. and the Philippines, and retells the story of the resistance movement against the occupying Japanese military forces of the barrio people first seen in Day. It narrates the people's "grim experiences" during the war.

First published in 1947, Javellana's novel sold 125,000 copies in the U.S. and was reprinted in paperback edition in Manila by Alemar's-Phoenix in 1976. The same novel was made into a film by the Filipino filmmaker and director, Lino Brocka under the title Santiago!, which starred the Filipino actor and later presidential candidate, Fernando Poe, Jr. and the Filipino actress, Hilda Koronel. It was also made into a miniseries film for Philippine television. The published novel received praises from the New York Times, New York Sun and Chicago Sun. Without Seeing the Dawn, the novel, became the culmination of Javellana's short-story writing career. The said novel was also known under the title The Lost Ones.

It was adapted into the Filipino television play Malayo Pa Ang Umaga.

== See also ==
- Cry Slaughter! by E.K. Tiempo
- The Rosales Saga by F. Sionil José
- The Man Who (Thought He) Looked Like Robert Taylor by Bienvenido Santos
- Philippine literature in English
- Literature of the Philippines
- Philippine English
