= Cry Slaughter! =

1953 novel by Edilberto K. Tiempo

Cry Slaughter! (Watch in the Night)
- Book cover for Edilberto K. Tiempo's novel Cry Slaughter!
- Author: Edilberto K. Tiempo
- Language: English
- Genre: Fiction
- Publisher: Avon (New York)
- Publication date: 1953 (Philippines), 1957 (USA)
- Publication place: Philippines
- Pages: 160
- ISBN: 1-150-65913-0

Cry Slaughter! is a 1957 novel by Filipino author Edilberto K. Tiempo. Before the novel’s revision for publication in the United States, it was first published in the Philippines as Watch in the Night in 1953. In the United States, the renamed novel was printed four times by Avon in New York City. In 1959, Cry Slaughter! was published and assigned the number R306 by Digit Books. It had been published as a hardbound book in London, England. It had been translated into six languages in other parts of Europe.

== Plot description ==
The setting of Cry Slaughter! was World War II. The novel narrates the story of guerrillas who were unwilling to surrender while awaiting the return of the armed forces of the United States. In addition, the novel features the tale about the girlfriend of a guerrilla lover. The woman chose to disobey the will of her pro-Japanese parents. The woman decided to join her lover in a hiding place in the hills.

== Historical background ==
During the Japanese occupation period of the Philippines, the manuscript for E. K. Tiempo’s Cry Slaughter! was smuggled out of the country aboard a submarine. For the duration of World War II, the novel was suppressed by the United States Department of War in Washington, D.C. When published, the novel was mass marketed in paperback format. Cry Slaughter was described by Robin W. Winks and James Robert Rush in the book entitled Asia in Western Fiction as “one of the few books that mingle melodrama and style”. It was further described as a book that “can be taken as a fairly reliable indicator of real attitudes in a real place at a real time”. According to Winks and Rush, Cry Slaughter! – among many other literature written by Filipino writers in the English-language – that belongs to the "domain of American writing that spans about a century". For Winks and Rush, each Filipino author like Edilberto K. Tiempo is within a "class of his own and apart from one another".

== See also ==
- Without Seeing the Dawn by Stevan Javellana
- The Rosales Saga by F. Sionil José
- The Man Who (Thought He) Looked Like Robert Taylor by Bienvenido Santos
