= Mia Tijam =

Mia Tijam (born in Iriga City, Philippines) is a Bicolana writer in English and the author of Flowers for Thursday: Stories (Ateneo de Naga University Press).

She is one of the first fellows for creative non-fiction (CNF) in the 2007 Silliman National Writers Workshop, and a fellow in CNF in the 2024 Women’s Annual Writing Workshop. She writes essays and is a fellow writer and co-editor of the Philippine Speculative Fiction Sampler. Her writing has appeared in the Philippines Free Press, Philippine Speculative Fiction anthologies, Philippine Genre Stories, and Expanded Horizons; where it was merited an Honorable Mention in the Best Fantasy & Horror category in 2008, was shortlisted in the 2009 Philippines Free Press Literary Awards, was included in Charles Tan’s Best of Philippine Speculative Fiction 2009, UP Press Best of Philippine Speculative Fiction 2009, and the 2012 Mariner Awards.

In 2021, she released her first collection of short stories in English, Flowers for Thursday: Stories, published by Ateneo de Naga University Press. The book features six stories. Its bilingual second edition, published in 2024, is the first English-Rinconada short fiction book in Philippine literature. With Herminio S. Beltran, Jr. as editor, Tijam is the special section editor of Ani 41: Lakbay, the official literary journal of the Intertextual Division of the Cultural Center of the Philippines (CCP) features 146 writings by new and veteran writers including poems in English and several Filipino languages such as Filipino, Waray, Hiligaynon, and Kankanaey.

Her latest short story collection, The and That Was (Rosarium Publishing) was released in 2026.

== Education ==
Mia Tijam was raised in Naga City where she studied high school. She studied European languages, philosophy, literary theory, creative writing, and comparative literature at the University of the Philippines, Diliman.

She works as a project director at University of Nueva Caceres.
