= Ermita (disambiguation) =

Ermita is a district of Manila, Philippines.

Ermita may also refer to:

- Ermita (novel), a novel by F. Sionil José

- Ermita "Ermi" Rojo, the protagonist of the novel

- Ermita metro station, Mexico City
- Ermita Church, Manila, Philippines
- Eduardo Ermita (1935–2025), Filipino military officer and politician

== See also ==
- Hermitage (religious retreat)
