= 1961 Palanca Awards =

Awards ceremony

11th Palanca Memorial Awards

The 11th Carlos Palanca Memorial Awards for Literature was held to commemorate the memory of Carlos T. Palanca, Sr. through an endeavor that would promote education and culture in the country.

The 1961 winners, the eleventh recipients of the awards, were divided into four categories, open only to English and Filipino [Tagalog] short story and one-act play:

== English Division ==
=== Short Story ===
- First Prize: Kerima Polotan Tuvera, "The Sound of Sunday"
- Second Prize: Bienvenido N. Santos, "The Day the Dancers Came"
- Third Prize: Wilfrido D. Nolledo, "Adios Ossimandas"

=== One-Act Play ===
- First Prize: Jesus T. Peralta, "Longer Than Mourning"
- Second Prize: Julian E. Dacanay Jr., "The Celebrants"
- Third Prize: Wilfrido D. Nolledo, "Amour Impossible"

== Filipino Division ==
=== Maikling Kwento ===
- First Prize: Genoveva Edroza-Matute, "Parusa"
- Second Prize: Clodualdo Del Mundo Jr., "Binhi"
- Third Prize: Efren Reyes Abueg, "Mabangis Na Lungsod"

=== Dulang May Isang Yugto ===
- First Prize: Amado V. Hernandez, "Magkabilang Mukha ng Isang Bagol"
- Second Prize: Fernando L. Samonte, "Ikalawang Mukha ng Paninindigan"
- Third Prize: Buenaventura S. Medina Jr., "Mga Kaawa-awa"

== Sources ==
- "The Don Carlos Palanca Memorial Awards for Literature | Winners 1961". Archived from the original on 2009-10-22.
