= Agustin Martin Rodriguez =

Filipino philosopher

Agustin Martin Guidote Rodriguez is a Filipino social philosopher, writer, and academic, serving as Professor of Philosophy at Ateneo de Manila University. In his research, he critically examines the structures, policies, and laws designed to promote greater community involvement in the Philippines and the Global South. His works question whether participation remains out of reach for these communities due to the need for resources and social connections they often lack.

== Education and career ==
Rodriguez earned his Bachelor of Arts (AB), Master of Arts (MA), and Doctor of Philosophy (PhD) degrees in Philosophy from the Ateneo de Manila University. In 1986, he became a fellow of the Silliman National Writers Workshop, the longest-running creative writing workshop in Asia.

He is a faculty member in the Department of Philosophy at the Ateneo de Manila and previously led the department as chair from 2009 to 2015. Writing primarily in the Filipino language, in addition to English, his scholarly work focuses on the reasoning of marginalized communities, particularly in relation to human rights, participatory governance, and grassroots empowerment. He also engages with the ideas of thinkers like Jürgen Habermas, Max Scheler, and Jacques Derrida.

== Bibliography ==
- Doing philosophy: an introduction to the philosophy of the human person. 2018. Quezon City: BlueBooks.
- May laro and diskurso ng katarungan [The game and discourse of justice]. Quezon City: Ateneo de Manila University Press.
- Pag-ibig ang katwiran ng kasaysayan: tadhana at kapalaran sa pilosopiya ng kasaysayan ni Max Scheler [Love as the reason of history: Destiny and fate in Max Scheler's philosophy of history]. Quezon City: Office of Research and Publications, Ateneo de Manila University.
