= Ermita (novel) =

1988 novel by F. Sionil José

Ermita: A Filipino Novel
- Book cover for F. Sionil José's Ermita: A Filipino Novel.
- Author: F. Sionil José
- Language: English
- Genre: Fiction
- Publisher: Solidaridad Publishing House, Inc.
- Publication date: 1988
- Publication place: Philippines
- ISBN: 971-8845-12-7
- OCLC: 43424427

Ermita: A Filipino Novel is a novel by the known Filipino author F. Sionil Jose written in the English language. A chapter of this novel was previously published as a novella in the books titled Two Filipino Women and Three Filipino Women.

== Characters ==
Rojo Family

- Maria Ermita (Ermi) is the main character in the novel.
- Conchita (Conching) is the mother of Ermi.
- Felicitas (Fely) is the rich socialite aunt of Ermi.
- Joselito is the businessman uncle of Ermi.

Servants

- Arturo is the driver of the Rojos.
- Orang is married to Arturo.
- Macarthur is the son of Arturo. He is a close friend of Ermi.
- Nanet is the daughter of Arturo.
- Alejandra

Friends of Ermi

- Rolando Cruz - Professor of History and a frequent customer of Camarin Bar and Restaurant.
- Didi - Owner of Camarin Bar and Restaurant.

Ermi's Customers

- The Great Man - Prime Minister of an Asian country.
- Senator Andres Bravo
- Businessman Eduardo Dantes

Others

- Sister Constancia (Tancing) is the head of orphanage the took care and educated of the child Ermi.
- General Bombilla - an honest man who became Marcos' man.
- Anita - aging prostitute that Ermi saved from poverty.
- Lily - daughter of Anita who became anti-Marcos

== Scenes ==
F. Sionil José brings the reader to a story to a time in Philippine history before the declaration of Martial Law by Ferdinand Marcos during the 1950s. José also brings his readers to prewar and post-war Ermita, formerly the district of Manila's elite. The reader is also brought to the Philippines in the year 1941, a country that went through the experience of being attacked and occupied by the Empire of Japan, a nation that suffered the effects of World War II and of going through the regime of the Marcos government.

== Reviews ==
Ermita: A Filipino Novel was one of the books reviewed by Ian Buruma for The New York Review of Books, and was one of the recommended Filipino-authored books to be reviewed under a reading and writing program of the University of Hawaiʻi at Mānoa, together with other works by José, together with other long narratives written by Filipino authors such as Nick Joaquin, Bienvenido Santos, Ninotchka Rosca, Edilberto Tiempo, Alfrredo Navarro Salanga, NVM Gonzales, Cecilia Manguerra Brainard, Alfred Yuson, Carlos Bulosan, Jessica Hagedorn, Peter Bacho, and Wilfredo Nolledo.

== Translation ==
The novel was published in Korean, in 2007. It was translated from English to Korean by Boo Hee-ryung.

== See also ==
- Literature of the Philippines
- Philippine English
- Philippine literature in English
