= Solidaridad Bookshop =

Solidaridad
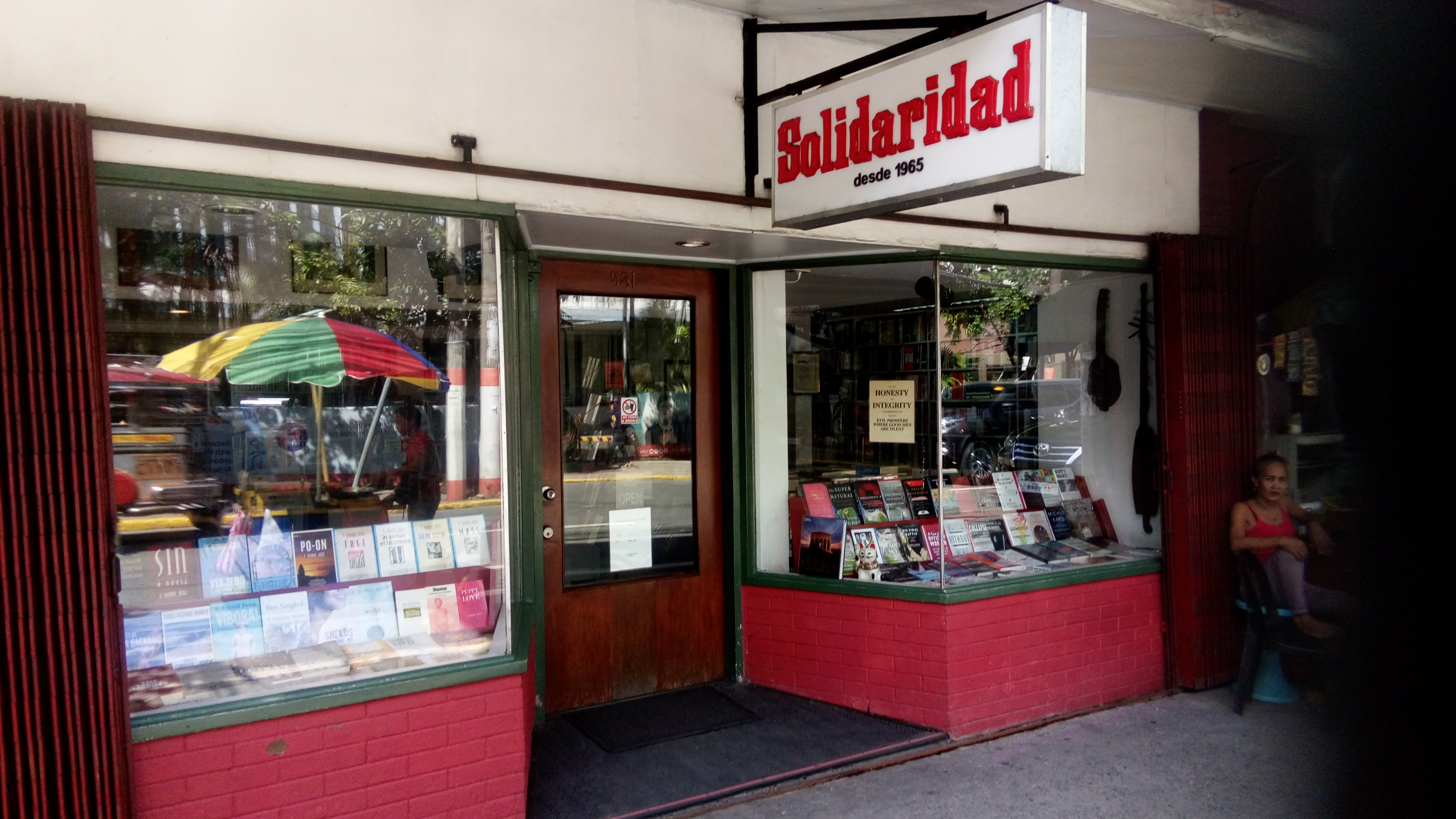
- Interactive map of the Solidaridad area

General information
- Type: Bookstore
- Location: Ermita, 531 Padre Faura Street, Manila, Philippines
- Coordinates: 14.577954249704264°N 120.98207658651751°E
- Opened: 1964
- Owner: F. Sionil José and family (1964-2025); Leandro Leviste (2025-present)

Website
- Facebook

Solidaridad is a bookstore in the Ermita district of Manila, the Philippines. Having first opened its doors in 1964, it is owned by Philippine national artist F. Sionil José and managed by his family after his and his wife's death. It is sometimes called "the best little bookstore in Asia."

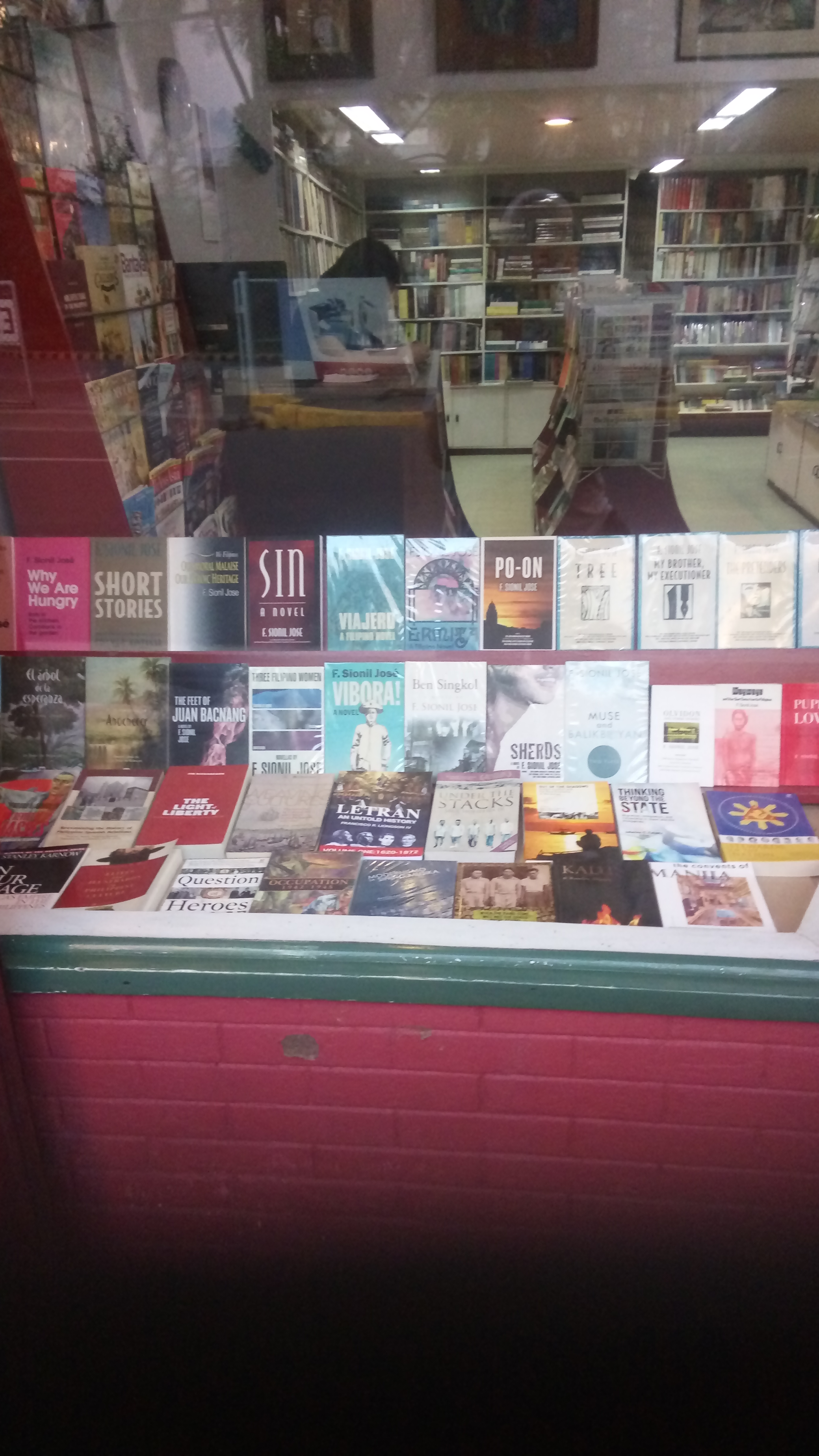
Books on display.

The shop features the owner's own works and works by other Filipino authors such as Jose Rizal, Nick Joaquin, Paz Marquez Benitez, N.V.M. Gonzalez, Gilda Cordero-Fernando, Bienvenido Santos, and Lualhati Bautista. Selected foreign titles are also offered at the bookstore. It has been claimed that they have the widest selection of Filipiniana works in the Philippines.

In 2025, José's heirs put the store for sale. It was sold to Leandro Leviste, a friend of José, in November.
