= Sherds (novel) =

Book by F. Sionil José

- Book cover for F. Sionil José's novel Sherds
- Author: F. Sionil José
- Language: English
- Publisher: Solidaridad Publishing House
- Publication date: 2007
- Publication place: Philippines
- Media type: Print

Sherds (“fragments of pottery” or "potsherds") is a 2007 short novel or novelette written by Filipino National Artist for Literature and multi-awarded author F. Sionil José. According to Elmer A. Ordoñez, a writer from The Manila Times, in Sherds José achieved “lyrical effects”, specially in the novel’s final chapters, by putting into “good use” Joseph Conrad’s and Ford Madox Ford’s so-called progression d’effet (literally "progression of the effect"). Sherds is the latest and last novel by José. According to The Atlantic National Correspondent James Fallows, the novel is dedicated to the author’s wife Teresita José. The novel, which can be read in one sitting, was described by Li-an de la Cruz-Busto, a reporter for Sun.Star Davao as “very light but candid and insightful”, a description that complements The Manila Times reporter Perry Gil S. Mallari’s calling José’s Sherds as an “easy read and a guaranteed page-turner”. A novel composed of twelve chapters with a "tight and palpable" narrative pacing, Sherds deals with topics related to "personal conscience, greed and the position of art" in social class struggle, thus serving as a cogitation on "what is wrong" with the Philippines as a nation. José wrote Sherds while he was in Japan.

== Description ==
Like José’s other novels and stories such as the Rosales Saga, Sherds is another presentation and “meditation” by the author regarding “class conflict” and “malaise in society” in the Philippines through the use of “non-ideological terms” and sharing of his personal knowledge of the “travails of the original tillers of the soil” and the dispossession of the land-tillers through the workings of the oligarchs.

Employing a story-telling technique that begins with the “ending of the story, in medias res”, José narrates the tale of the discovery made by Peter Gregory Golangco (also known simply as PG Golangco), a pottery-and-ceramics artist, art professor, and aesthete, through the “Pygmalion-like nurturing” of Guia Espiritu, Golangco’s student who has an elemental idea of art that is “grounded in the clay of oppressed people” of the Philippine countryside.

As an “art and society” novel, the ninth chapter of Sherds showed Golangco as an aesthete questioned about his pose and position regarding social protest and his views about Pablo Picasso and Francisco Goya during an art exhibit. Golangco is a believer that “art thrives on freedom”. However, a guest during the exhibition countered Golangco’s belief by saying that freedom is a “political condition” and that Golangco is a free person because of influence and the financial means to buy freedom, which is contrary to the so-called unpampered and unfree “artists of the people”. Despite such "questioning", Golangco was applauded. Surprised, Golangco retreated to Café Guernica, where he became “almost inconsolable” until Golangco was reassured by two female companions. According to Elmer A. Ordoñez, this scene in Sherds, is where Golangco’s “education of the aesthete” started.

The novel is full of symbolism. The primary example of such usage of symbolism is the clay used by PG Golangco in making pots. The clay symbolizes the oppressed villagers in Espiritu's barrio. As a symbolic element of the narrative, the clay has a fundamental function at the finale of the novel.

== Principal characters ==
The major protagonists of the novel are Peter Gregory Golangco and Guia Espiritu. Golangco, a recognized art scholar abroad and a member of a hacienda-owning clan, was a student, artist, academic, and occasional “sybaritic delights” indulger who decided to return to the Philippines. Golangco was oblivious to the fact that the Golangcos who stayed in the Philippines were the source of oppression, death, and poverty in the village in his hometown. The Golangco clan has a thriving business enterprise inside and outside the Philippines. The clan also participated in Philippine politics through elections and accepting appointments to positions at the “higher echelons” of the Philippine Government. PG Golangco had a “long-standing affair” with the dean of the university where he is teaching. The dean was a former student of Golangco. PG Golangco was unaware that the Golangcos were responsible for the demise of the parents of Guia Espiritu, Golangco's student.

Guia Espiritu is Golangco’s student-assistant and “protégé in grooming”. Espiritu described the Philippines as a country and society that remained semi-feudal and semi-colonial. Despite being the art student, Espiritu became Golangco’s “educator of the aesthete”. Espiritu introduced and mentored Golangco about the clay and pottery practices of her parents and in her village. Such introduction and mentoring lead Golangco to the “aesthetics and pedagogy” of the oppressed and the dispossessed, and eventually to Golangco’s discovery of Espiritu’s origins. Golangco became intrigued by of the “strange happenings in his own household and dealings” with Espiritu.
