= Vibora! =

2007 novel by F. Sionil José

- Book cover for F. Sionil José's novel Vibora!
- Author: F. Sionil José
- Language: English
- Genre: Fiction
- Publication date: 2007
- Publication place: Philippines
- ISBN: 971-8845-43-7

Vibora! (literally meaning "Viper!") is a 2007 novel written by Filipino National Artist F. Sionil José. The novel narrates the life of an accidental hero, Benjamin Singkol, during the Japanese occupation of the Philippines after escaping from Bataan during the Second World War. Singkol in turn narrates the life of Artemio "Vibora" Ricarte whose identity is being questioned: whether a patriot or a collaborator to the Japanese occupiers.
