= The God Stealer =

- Short story by F. Sionil José
- Collection first edition
- Language: English

Publication
- Publisher: Solidaridad Publishing House, Inc.
- Publication date: 1959 (short story); 1968 (collection)
- Publication place: Philippines

"The God Stealer" is a short story by Filipino National Artist F. Sionil José. It is José's most anthologized work of fiction. It is not just a tale about an Ifugao stealing a religious idol, but also about the friendship that developed between a Filipino and an American, a representation of the relationship that developed between the "influenced" and the "influencer". The story was a first prize winner during the 1959 Palanca awards in the Philippines. It is included in the book by José with a similar title, The God Stealer and Other Stories.

== Character description ==
The main characters in "The God Stealer" are Philip Latak and Sam Cristie. Philip, also known as Ip-pig, is an Ifugao who became a Christian and lived in Manila. By becoming a city dweller, Philip became less sentimental with his cultural identity, beliefs, and customs. His name was derived from the word Philippines. On the other hand, Sam Christie was an American who wanted to view the rice terraces of Ifugao. He was also interested in purchasing an original figurine of an Ifugao god. His name was derived from Uncle Sam, a representation of the United States. Philip and Sam were co-workers.

== Summary ==
Philip and Sam went to Baguio City. During a feast honoring Philip for his return, Philip and Sam were irritated because of the unwillingness of the Ifugao people to sell any Ifugao statue. Philip plans to steal his grandfather's idol of a god in return for the salary raise given to him by Americans.

== Interpretation ==
Philip's act of thievery represented the Filipinos' giving up of their past tribal origins and traditions, only to be replaced by an "unnatural" culture brought by colonialism. At one time in history, colonialism brought to the Filipinos a state of confusion, troubled emotions, helplessness, torment, embarrassment and the inability to embrace the past.

== See also ==
- The Quiet American
