= Ian Casocot =

Filipino journalist & writer (born 1975)

Ian Rosales Casocot
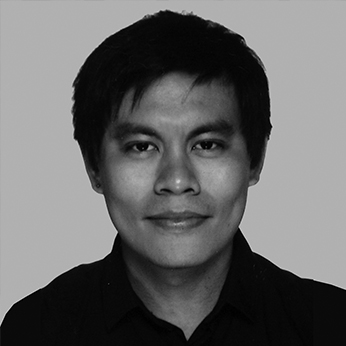
- Ian Rosales Casocot, 2010
- Born: Ian Fermin Rosales Casocot; August 17, 1975 (age 51); Dumaguete
- Education: Silliman University; International Christian University
- Occupations: Writer; professor
- Parents: Fermin Bernaldez Casocot (father); Fennie Rosales Casocot (mother)
- Website: eatingthesun.blogspot.com

Ian Rosales Casocot (born 17 August 1975) is a Filipino journalist and writer of speculative fiction, literary fiction, poetry, drama, and creative nonfiction from Dumaguete, Philippines. He is known for his prizewinning short stories "Old Movies," "The Hero of the Snore Tango," "Rosario and the Stories," "A Strange Map of Time," "The Sugilanon of Epefania's Heartbreak," and "Things You Don't Know." He maintained A Critical Survey of Philippine Literature, a website on Filipino writings and literary criticism.

Casocot also does graphic design, and taught literature, creative writing, and film at Silliman University in Dumaguete, where he was the founding coordinator of the Edilberto and Edith Tiempo Creative Writing Center, and where he was the Literary Arts and Cinema Vice-Chair of the Silliman University Culture and Arts Council.

== Education ==
Casocot studied at the International Christian University (Tokyo, Japan) in 1998, and Silliman University (Dumaguete, Philippines) where he graduated cum laude with a B.A. in Mass Communication in 1999, and then an M.A. in English (Creative Writing) in 2012.

== Writing fellowships ==
He was a fellow for fiction at the Silliman University National Writers Workshop in Dumaguete in 2000, the Iligan National Writers Workshop in 2002, and the University of the Philippines National Writers Workshop in Baguio in 2008. He would later become coordinator and then panelist of the Silliman University National Writers Workshop, which was founded by Philippine writers Edilberto K. Tiempo and National Artist Edith Tiempo in 1962.

In 2010, he represented the Philippines for the Fall Residency of the International Writing Program of the University of Iowa in Iowa City.

== Books and publications ==
He is the author of six collections of short stories, including Old Movies and Other Stories (NCCA, 2005), Beautiful Accidents (University of the Philippines Press, 2011), Heartbreak & Magic: Stories of Fantasy and Horror (Anvil, 2011), First Sight of Snow and Other Stories (Et Al Books, 2014). Don't Tell Anyone [co-authored with Shakira Andrea Sison] (Anvil, 2017), and Bamboo Girls: Stories and Poems from a Forgotten Life (Ateneo de Naga University Press, 2018). Where You Are is Not Here, another short story collection, is forthcoming. Beautiful Accidents, his collection of stories with frank LGBT themes, was nominated for the National Book Award in 2012.

He has also authored a biography of Dumaguete stateswoman and entrepreneur Ma. Luisa Locsin, Inday Goes About Her Day (Locsin Books, 2012), and edited Handulantaw (Cultural Affairs Committee, 2013), a coffee-table book celebrating the arts and culture of Silliman University. He has also edited two landmark anthologies, Future Shock Prose: An Anthology of Young Writers and New Literatures (Silliman Press, 2002), which was nominated as Best Anthology in the National Book Awards given by the Manila Critics Circle, and Celebration: An Anthology Commemorating the Fiftieth Anniversary of the Silliman University National Writers Workshop (Silliman Press, 2013).

His short stories, poems, and essays have been published in various anthologies, and in Rogue Magazine, Esquire Philippines Magazine, Smile Magazine, CNN Philippines, 8List, The Sunday Times, Sands & Coral, Dapitan, Tomas, Philippines Free Press, Philippines Graphic, Sunday Inquirer Magazine, and Philippine Daily Inquirer. He also writes two weekly columns, "The Spy in the Sandwich" for Visayan Daily Star and "Tempest in a Coffee Mug" for Dumaguete MetroPost.

== Awards ==
He is the recipient of five Don Carlos Palanca Memorial Awards for Literature and an NVM Gonzalez Prize for his fiction, and his novel Sugar Land was long-listed in the 2008 Man Asian Literary Prize.

His children's book Rosario and the Stories garnered him an honorable mention in the 2006 PBBY-Salanga Writer's Prize. His stories "A Strange Map of Time" and "The Sugilanon of the Epefania’s Heartbreak" have also won the top prizes in the Fully-Booked/Neil Gaiman Philippine Graphic/Fiction Awards, the only writer in the award's history who has done so.

== Films ==
Casocot has directed the short film "Trahedya sa Kabila ng Liwanag," and produced the documentary City of Literature, directed by the Chinese filmmaker Zhao Lewis Liu.

For many years, he is Director of the Silliman Film Open, and is the 2017-2019 Visayas Representative for the National Committee on Cinema of the National Commission for Culture and the Arts.
