= 1959 Palanca Awards =

Philippine literary award

9th Palanca Memorial Awards

The 9th Carlos Palanca Memorial Awards for Literature was held to commemorate the memory of Carlos T. Palanca, Sr. through an endeavor that would promote education and culture in the country.

LIST OF WINNERS

The 1959 winners, the ninth recipients of the awards, were divided into four categories, open only to English and Filipino [Tagalog] short story and one-act play:

== English Division ==
=== Short Story ===
- First Prize: F. Sionil Jose, "The God Stealer"
- Second Prize: Kerima Polotan Tuvera, "The Giants"
- Third Prize: N.V.M. Gonzales, "On the Ferry"

=== One-Act Play ===
- First Prize: Epifanio San Juan Jr., "In the Tangled Snare"
- Second Prize: No Winner
- Third Prize: Jesus T. Peralta, "Scent of Fear"

== Filipino Division ==
=== Maikling Kwento ===
- First Prize: Buenaventura S. Medina Jr., "Dayuhan"
- Second Prize: Pedro L. Ricarte, "Estero"
- Third Prize: Efren Reyes Abueg, "Mapanglaw ang Mukha ng Buwan"

=== Dulang May Isang Yugto ===
- First Prize: No Winner
- Second Prize: Amado V. Hernandez, "Hagdan sa Bahaghari"
- Third Prize: No Winner

== Sources ==
- "The Don Carlos Palanca Memorial Awards for Literature | Winners 1959". Archived from the original on 2009-10-22.
