= 2001 Palanca Awards =

Philippine literary award

51st Palanca Awards
- Date: September 1, 2001
- Location: The Peninsula Manila, Makati, Philippines

The 51st Don Carlos Palanca Memorial Awards for Literature was held on September 1, 2001, at The Peninsula Manila in Makati to commemorate the memory of Don Carlos Palanca Sr. through an endeavor that would promote education and culture in the country. Ateneo de Manila University President Fr. Bienvenido Nebres, S.J. was Guest of Honor and Speaker at this year's awarding ceremony.

Leoncio P. Deriada and Alfred A. Yuson were this year's Palanca Hall of Fame awardees. Deriada clinched his fifth first prize for “Maragtas: How Kapinangan Tricked Sumakwel Thrice” under the Full-Length Play category. And Yuson clinched his fifth first prize for “Pillage and Other Poems” under the Poetry category. The said award is given to writers who have won five first places in any category.

LIST OF WINNERS

The 2001 winners are divided into four categories:

== English Division ==
=== Short Story ===
- First Prize: Rosario Cruz Lucero, "The Death of Fray Salvador Montano, Conquistador of Negros"
- Second Prize: Angelo Rodriguez Lacuesta, "White Elephants"
- Third Prize: Lakambini Sitoy, "Lyra"

=== Future Fiction ===
- First Prize: Timothy Montes, "Turtle Season"
- Second Prize: Maria Fres-Felix, "Past Forward"
- Third Prize: Antonio Hidalgo, "The Third Placed Coming"

=== Short Story for Children ===
- First Prize: Grace Chong, "Apo Mayor"
- Second Prize: Irene Limpe, "The Ghost of Maria Matalas"
- Third Prize: Marie Louise Kalaw Santos, "Nor Has Ear Heard"

=== Poetry ===
- First Prize: Alfred Yuson, "Pillage and Other Poems"
- Second Prize: Conchitina Cruz, "The Shortest Distance"
- Third Prize: John Labella, "To The Dreamer of Last Things"

=== Essay ===
- First Prize: Queena Lee-Chua, "Cogito Ergo Sum, or What I Know for Sure I Learned from Science"
- Second Prize: Ernie Zarate, "Lengua Estopado Does Not Mean Stupid Language"
- Third Prize: Tad Ermitano, "Satellite of Hate"

=== One-Act Play ===
- First Prize: No Winner
- Second Prize: Glenn Sevilla Mas, "In The Gray"
- Third Prize: No Winner

=== Full-Length Play ===
- First Prize: Leoncio Deriada, "Maragtas: How Kapinangan Tricked Sumakwel Thrice"
- Second Prize: Rodolfo Vera, "The Dreamweavers"
- Third Prize: Christopher Gozum, "War Booty"

== Filipino Division ==
=== Maikling Kwento ===
- First Prize: Edgardo Maranan, "Ang Apo ni Lola Soledad"
- Second Prize: Roy V. Aragon, "Ang Baliw ng Bayan ng Sili"
- Third Prize: Gil Olea Mendoza, "Kalayo"

=== Future Fiction [Filipino] ===
- First Prize: Reuel Molina Aguila, "Ampalaya"
- Second Prize: Jimmuel Naval, "Ima"
- Third Prize: Khavn De La Cruz, "Ang Pamilyang Kumakain ng Lupa"

=== Maikling Kwentong Pambata ===
- First Prize: Luis Gatmaitan, "Sandosenang Sapatos"
- Second Prize: Glenda Oris, "Ang Madyik ni Paolo"
- Third Prize: Dencel Limbo-Aquino, "Ang Mahiwagang Kahon"

=== Tula ===
- First Prize: Michael Coroza, "Mga Lagot na Liwanag"
- Second Prize: Rebecca T. Anonuevo, "Nakatanim ng Granada Ang Diyos"
- Third Prize: Eugene Evasco, "Ang Paghagilap sa Karaniwan"

=== Sanaysay ===
- First Prize: Eugene Evasco, "Mga Pilat Sa Pilak"
- Second Prize: Reynaldo Duque, "Ang Kumbento, Ang Aklatan at Ang Casa Tribunal ng Candon"
- Third Prize: Jing Castro Panganiban, "Sari-Saring Paninda"

=== Dulang May Isang Yugto ===
- First Prize: Jose Victor Z. Torres, "Resureksiyon"
- Second Prize: Ferdinand Jarin, "Sardinas"
- Third Prize: Aurora Yumul, "Kumpit: Sa Ngalan ng Krus at ng Kris"

=== Dulang Ganap ang Haba ===
- First Prize: Chris Martinez, "Last Order sa Penguin"
- Second Prize: Edward Perez, "Iraya"
- Third prize: Allan Librada Panlileo, "Indio Anakbanua"

=== Dulang Pantelebisyon ===
- First Prize: Quark Henares, "A Date With Jao Mapa"
- Second Prize: Althea Lauren Ricardo, "Pick Up"
- Third Prize: Tomas Agulto, "San Nicolas"

=== Dulang Pampelikula ===
- First Prize: Roy Iglesias, "Ligalig"
- Second Prize: Ma. Rebecca Arcega, "Pagkatapos ng Paalam"
- Third Prize: Edward Mark Meily, "Bayad Luha"

== Regional Division ==
=== Short Story [Cebuano] ===
- First Prize: Macario Tiu, "Ang Bata Nga Dili Matulog"
- Second Prize: Arturo Penaserada, "Tuli"
- Third Prize: Ricardo Patalinjug, "Takna sa Kagabhion"

=== Short Story [Hiligaynon] ===
- First Prize: Isabel Sebullen, "Ang Mga Birhen sa Masulog"
- Second prize: Leoncio Deriada, "Lubid"
- Third Prize: Nerio Jedeliz Jr., "Ang Likom Sang Baryo Malikom"

=== Short Story [Iluko] ===
- First Prize: Reynaldo Duque, "Ysabelo"
- Second Prize: William Alvarado, "Dagiti Maris Ti Bannagaw"
- Third Prize: Arnold Pascual Jose, "Ti Wagayway, Ni Lakay Pedro Salacnib Ken Maysa A Bigat"

== Kabataan Division ==
=== Kabataan Essay ===
- First Prize: Enrico Miguel Subido, "Of Enormous Turnips, Little Books and Life’s Big Lessons"
- Second Prize: Patricia Nicole Golez, "The Greatest ‘Trash’ I’ve Read"
- Third prize: Frances Majella Tan Cabahug, "A Glimpse of Dawn"

=== Kabataan Sanaysay ===
- First Prize: Reynaldo Bienvenido Duque II, "Bagani Ubbog: Paghahanap sa Tatak ng Angkan"
- Second Prize: Karen Jamora, "Ang Libro, Ang Mambabasa, Ang Pagbabago"
- Third Prize: Jefferson Capati, "Huwag Mo Akong Salingin, Indiong Gusgusin"

== Sources ==
- "The Don Carlos Palanca Memorial Awards for Literature | Winners 2001". Archived from the original on 2009-10-22.
