= The Day the Dancers Came =

- Short story by Bienvenido N. Santos
- Country: Philippines
- Language: English

Publication
- Publication date: 1955

"The Day the Dancers Came" is a 1955 short story written by award-winning Filipino American author Bienvenido N. Santos. Set in 1950s Chicago, it is a classic work of the Filipino diaspora. Apart from being a Republic Cultural Heritage Award in Literature awardee (the most prestigious literary award in the Philippines), Santos was a Wichita State University Distinguished Writer in Residence, a National Award for Literature in Fiction recipient, a US National Award Endowment for the Arts Award in Creative Writing honoree, and a Southeast Asia Writer's Award holder.

== Description ==
A tale of the Filipino diaspora and regarded as a Filipino literary classic, the story "The Day the Dancers Came" won the Free Press Literary Awards on September 24, 1960, an award given by the Philippine Free Press magazine. Also a second-prize winning story during the 1961 Palanca Awards, it is also part of Santos's short story collection of the same name, The Day the Dancers Came and Other Prose Works, published in Manila in 1967. In "The Day the Dancers Came" – as in Scent of Apples and You Lovely People — Santos “memorialized the tenderness, nostalgia,” and “bittersweet story” of Filipino manongs, a title or designation referring to male old-timers from the Ilocos region, living in the United States by creating tales based on “his memories" of his own "generation". In the story, Santos wrote that “Like time, memory was often a villain, a betrayer.". Set during the 1950s in the U.S. city of Chicago, the short story's central character named Fil is longing for the Philippines and is enthusiastic to meet, greet, and entertain a visiting group of young Filipino female tinikling dancers. However, Fil realizes that the dancers must have been cautioned against puck “manongs” like himself because the “bamboo dancers” circumvents and made fun of Fil and other old-timers. "The Day the Dancers Came" has literary and thematic connections with other short stories by Santos. As Paul A. Rodell explained, even though modern-day Filipinas have changed (as in Santos's short story "Brown Coterie") and the “face in the picture has become blurred” (as in Santos's short story Scent of Apples), the Filipino émigrés held on to their visualizations of the Philippines because such visions were the “only things worth holding on to and the only things tying” the old-timers like Fil to “their homeland”. In the short story, Santos examined the multifarious character of the “hybrid Philippine society” as it carefully moves forward into the contemporary world. Through "The Day the Dancers Came", Santos illustrated the United States as a place where dreams die away and “turn to ashes”, a western land where the early cohort of Filipino settlers and exiles crave to return to the Philippines, only to be confronted with the senselessness of doing such a homecoming.

== Adaptations ==
"The Day the Dancers Came" was adapted and made into a play entitled First Snow of November by Filipino fictionist and playwright Alfonso I. Dacanay. The stage version won first prize in the One-Act Play in English category during the 2005 Palanca Awards. Santos's tale was also adapted and made into a twenty-seven-minute film with the same title as the short story.
