= Gagamba =

1991 novel by F. Sionil José

- Book cover for F. Sionil José's novel Gagamba
- Author: F. Sionil José
- Language: English
- Genre: Fiction
- Publisher: Solidaridad Publishing House
- Publication date: 1991
- Publication place: Philippines
- Pages: 122
- ISBN: 971-536-105-6

Gagamba (meaning “spider”), subtitled The Spider Man, is a novel by award-winning and most widely translated Filipino author F. Sionil José. The novel is about a Filipino male cripple nicknamed “Gagamba”, a vendor of sweepstakes tickets in Ermita, Manila. After being buried in the wreckage, the seller survives an earthquake, together with two other fortunate characters, that occurred in the Philippines in the middle of July 1990. The novel simultaneously raised a “fundamental question” about the meaning of life and offers one “rational answer”.

== Description ==
The whole day, the cripple Gagamba whose real name is Tranquilino Penoy sells sweepstakes at the entrance to the Ermita restaurant called Camarin. The eating-place became well-known because it was frequented by the so-called “beautiful people” that Gagamba sees daily. The “beautiful people” includes the “big men” who are politicians, journalists, generals, landlords, and “handsome call-girls”. During an earthquake that hit the Philippines in July 1990, all the dining “beautiful people” at the Camarin were killed and entombed. The only survivors from the Camarin were Gagamba and two other persons.
