= More Than Conquerors (novel) =

1959 novel by Edilberto K. Tiempo

- Book cover for Edilberto K. Tiempo's novel More Than Conquerors.
- Author: Edilberto K. Tiempo
- Language: English
- Genre: Fiction
- Publisher: P.B. Ayuda (Manila, Philippines)
- Publication date: 1959
- Publication place: Philippines
- Pages: 110
- ISBN: 0-686-31073-X

More Than Conquerors is the second novel by Filipino author Edilberto K. Tiempo. The novel first appeared in 1959 in the pages of Weekly Women’s Magazine. It was first published in book format in 1964.

== Description ==
With the Filipino resistance movement during the Second World War employed as the “background” of the novel, the focus of the narrative is Andres, a lawyer, and his two brothers. The three brothers were tortured by the Japanese occupiers through the horizontal spread-eagle "crucifixion" method. The brothers’ predicament echoed a similarity to “the Christ figure in the midst of temptation and at Calvary”.
