= Tree (novel) =

1978 novel by F. Sionil José

Po-on A Novel
- Book cover for F. Sionil José's novel Tree.
- Author: F. Sionil José
- Language: English
- Genre: Fiction
- Publisher: Solidaridad Publishing House, Inc. (Philippines)
- Publication date: 1978
- Publication place: Philippines

Tree is a 1978 historical novel by Filipino National Artist F. Sionil José. A story of empathy and subjugation, it is the second in José’s series known as The Rosales Saga or the Rosales Novels. The tree in the novel is a representation of the expectations and dreams of Filipinos.

== Description ==
Set in the 1950s in the Philippines, Tree was the story about an unnamed Filipino boy, the son of a plantation manager and “subjugator of other Filipinos”, who grew up in an Ilocano town known as Rosales, Pangasinan. He was surrounded by acquaintances beneath his social class, relatives, and servants. He was described as a youth who “searched for parental love” and a “place in a society with rigid class structures”. He was also the grandson of the landlord protagonized by José in the novel Po-on. In Tree, the boy narrated the weakening relationship between the peasants and landowners in Ilocos, including how Don Vicente Asperri took over their lands.

Once the center of rice trading in eastern Luzon, Rosales became insolvent, thus making the protagonist child a witness to a series of social inequalities, humiliations and tragedies, making him despise his father, the overseer for the wealthy provincial and feudal landowner known as Don Vicente Asperri (Asperri’s illegitimate son, Luis Asperri, became a main character in José’s My Brother, My Executioner) The Philippine revolution brought no changes in the feudal system of the Philippines’ agrarian economy, except for the shift from Spanish to American colonialism. Only the Filipino landowners, their people, and the industrial leaders benefited from the free trade that was established between the Philippines and the United States. The tenants of the land and industrial laborers became impoverished. In spite of the injustices and suffering during the American period, the poor tenants became guerrillas to fight the Japanese occupiers in return for improved living conditions. The inequalities received by the tenants of the plantations resulted to the birth of an uprising that would change Philippine society forever.
