= Viajero =

1993 novel by F. Sionil José

- Book cover for F. Sionil José's novel Viajero.
- Author: F. Sionil José
- Language: English
- Genre: Fiction
- Publisher: Solidaridad Publishing House, Inc. (Philippines)
- Publication date: 1993
- Publication place: Philippines

Viajero, Spanish for "The Wanderer" or "The Traveller", is a 1993 English-language novel written by Filipino author F. Sionil José. The literary theme is about the constant search of the Filipino people for “social justice and moral order”. Viajero is one of the literary representatives embodying the fulfillment of the Filipinos' "emergent-nationalism".

== Main characters ==
The lead character of Viajero was an orphan named Salvador dela Raza (a Spanish name meaning “Savior of the [Filipino] Race”). In 1945, Raza was adopted and brought to America by James Wack, an African-American captain of the United States military. Dela Raza was a firsthand witness of the Filipino diaspora. Dela Raza was described to be a Philippine-born "nationalist hero" independent of American colonial influence who was able to recover the past of the Philippines long thought lost due to "colonial oppression". Dela Raza was the missing link or filler of the fundamental gaps or disjunctions between the Filipino Ilustrados and the common people known as the masa (referring to the "mass[ive number] of people" or the Philippine public), and between Filipino expatriates and the Filipinos who stayed in the Philippines. However, Dela Raza's knowledge of American issues and history made Viajero an allegorical reinforcement of "ideological interdependence" and reaffirmation of "American colonial tutelage", which was contrary to the goal of contemporary Filipino nationalists. Such goal was to define and diffentiate the Filipino view of nationalism from the American form of nationalism.

Other characters include the wife of Leo Mercado, Father Jess, and Simplicio Verdad (a name meaning "Simple Truth" or "Simply True" in translation). Some characters from José's The Rosales Saga also resurfaced in Viajero, such as Pepe Samson of José's Mass in the person of a full-pledged insurgent.

== Description ==
Viajero tackled Philippine History and the character of the Filipino people prior to the arrival of the Spaniards. The other “epic voyages” experienced by the Filipinos included the country’s contact with China, the tragedy of Ferdinand Magellan in Mactan Island, the voyages of galleon through the Pacific Ocean, the movement of Filipino men and women workers to the Middle East, Hong Kong, Singapore, and Tokyo Japan.

Although a novel about the Philippines, Viajero was also described as a novel about America because Dela Raza was educated by his American stepfather. Through Wack (a representation of the United States in the novel), Dela Raza learned of the issues that existed in America: racial discrimination, colonialism, failures of political ideals, betrayals of nationwide democracy, and ironies of American History. By discovering the American shortcomings, Dela Raza saw the failures in Philippine History. Thus Dela Raza was able to instruct and rejuvenate the Filipino youth to search in the past for answers in order to solve the Philippines' problems. Through Viajero José was able to point out the "failed opportunity of the revolution" to create the changes that could have been made by Corazon Aquino for the Filipino people when she was president.

== See also ==
- Viajero Confiable
