= The Pretenders (novel) =

1962 historical novel by F. Sionil José

- First edition
- Author: F. Sionil José
- Language: English
- Publisher: Solidaridad Publishing House, Inc. (Philippines)
- Publication date: 1962
- Publication place: Philippines

The Pretenders is a 1962 historical novel written by Filipino National Artist F. Sionil José. It is the second to the last novel composing José's series known as The Rosales Saga.

== Description ==
F. Sionil José's The Pretenders portrayed the master-and-servant and lord-and-slave relationship in the “industrial world” of Manila, Philippines. The timeline is set during the years after the Second World War, during the 1950s (because of a reference to Ramon Magsaysay found at the final pages of the novel).

== Characters ==
The principal character in The Pretenders is Antonio “Tony” Samson. Samson was a rural area resident of Cabugawan village in Rosales, Pangasinan, who gained a doctorate degree from Harvard University in New England of the United States. Samson was the grandson of Istak Samson who was also known as Eustaquio Salvador (Istak was the protagonist in José's Po-on). Antonio neglected his own father, the son of Istak Samson, who was punished by being imprisoned for life after his involvement in the burning of a municipio and killing Luis Asperri, the haciendero character in José's My Brother, My Executioner. Antonio was unable to marry his “hometown sweetheart” and cousin with whom he fathered Pepe, Antonio Samson's illegitimate child who became the protagonist in José's Mass. Samson was unable to fulfill the plan of marrying Pepe's mother because he became engaged with Carmen Villa in the U.S. Antonio married Carmen Villa, who was the daughter of Don Manuel, an “agro-industrial baron”, mestizo and “buyer of people”. The Don was able to purchase even a magazine journalist whom Antonio Samson considered a “man of integrity”. After one unfortunate and shameful event to another, including finding out that his “socialite wife” had had “affairs with other men”, Antonio Samson rebelled and committed suicide by hurling himself underneath a moving train.
