= Three Filipino Women =

1992 novel by F. Sionil José

Three Filipino Women: Novellas
- Book cover for F. Sionil José's Three Filipino Women
- Author: F. Sionil José
- Language: English
- Genre: Fiction
- Publisher: Random House
- Publication date: 1992
- Publication place: Philippines
- ISBN: 9780307830289

Two Filipino Women
- Book cover for F. Sionil José's Two Filipino Women
- Author: F. Sionil José
- Language: English
- Genre: Fiction
- Publisher: The Cellar Bookshop
- Publication date: 1981
- Publication place: Philippines
- Pages: 104
- ISBN: 9711001136

Three Filipino Women: Novellas is a book authored by award-winning Filipino literary writer, F. Sionil José. The book is a compilation of three novellas, each narrating a segment in the life and experiences of three women in the Philippines, providing the reader a journey to the "mentality and geography of the Philippines" and to the use of English as a language that the characters are "trying to make their own", reflective of how a Filipino speak in Philippine English, characterized by being "heavy on the reflexive" (similar to the speaking style used by Ferdinand Marcos) and with its own form of "phrasing" and "edge of formality".

== Description ==
One of the male narrators in the novellas was an educated man trying to "come to terms with post-colonial corruption, sexuality and women" tells the stories about three Filipino women who lived in three periods in Philippine history: one who lived during the late 1960s, another who lived in the 1970s, and the other lived in the early 1980s, all of whom experienced the politics and "their passions" during their own respective eras. The three novellas in the collection include Obsession, Platinum, and Cadena de Amor (literally "Chain of Love"). Three female characters were portrayed in each novella: one of a prostitute named Ermi (the "expensive call-girl") in Obsession, the other of a student political activist named Malu in Platinum, and another is of a politician named Narita in Cadena de Amor.

All the men acting as story-tellers in the novellas each hoped to have "a transcendent experience with the woman who fascinates him--but cannot escape the sense of his own corruption". The three novellas explored the "character of a Filipina, and by extension" of the Filipinos, their society and their nation.

== Publication history ==
The current compilation titled Three Filipino Women was published by Random House in the United States in 1992. Prior to that, two of the novellas were published by The Cellar Bookshop in the Philippines on December 28, 1981 as a 104-page book under the title Two Filipino Women (. One of the novellas, whose protagonist is named Ermi, a prostitute, was included as a chapter in a full-length 1988 novel titled Ermita: A Filipino Novel.
