= Mabangis Na Lungsod =

Story by Efren Abueg

Mabangis na Lungsod is a story written by Efren Abueg. This a real story is all about Adong (beggar) who lives in the front of the church of Quiapo begging for food and money.
