= Claire Delfin =

- Born: MelClaire Sy; February 13, 1981 (age 45); Quezon City
- Education: B.A. Mass Communication, Silliman University
- Occupations: Broadcast journalist (GMA Network)

MelClaire Sy-Delfin, or better known as Claire Delfin, (born February 13, 1981) is a Filipino broadcast journalist from GMA Network, a popular TV network in the Philippines. Delfin serves as correspondent of GMA-7's 24 Oras (24 Hours) which provides local news in Tagalog. An alumna of Silliman University where she obtained her B.A. in Mass Communication (1999), Delfin is a recipient of a number of prestigious awards. In 2007 she received the Global Media Award for Excellence in Population Reporting from the Population Institute in Washington D.C. for her story on child sexuality. In 2009, Delfin won two prizes in the annual PopDev awards, and in 2010, she again received the SEAMEO-Australia Press Award from the Southeast Asian Ministers of Education Organization (SEAMEO) for a story she wrote entitled "Palengskwela: Bringing the school to the market."
