= SS Uruguay =

SS Uruguay may refer to:

- SS Infanta Isabel de Borbon, launched in 1912 and renamed Uruguay in 1931
- SS California, launched in 1928 and renamed Uruguay in 1938
