= Ben Singkol =

2001 novel by F. Sionil José

- Book cover for F. Sionil José's novel Ben Singkol.
- Author: F. Sionil José
- Language: English
- Genre: Fiction
- Publication date: 2001
- Publication place: Philippines
- ISBN: 971-8845-32-1

Ben Singkol is a 2001 novel written by Filipino National Artist F. Sionil José. It is about Benjamin "Ben" Singkol, who is described as “perhaps the most interesting character” created by the author. Based on José's novel, Singkol is a renowned novelist who wrote the book entitled "Pain", an autobiography written during the Japanese occupation of the Philippines. Through the fictional novel, Singkol recalled the hardships experienced by the Filipinos during the occupation. Singkol was described to be a coward, a "supot" or an uncircumcised man who did not only run away from such a “ritual of manhood” but also evaded his “foxhole in Bataan when the Japanese soldiers were closing in”. Singkol was a “runner” or “evader” throughout much of his lifetime, while being haunted by the “poverty of his boyhood” and of the “treachery that he may have committed” in the past. In 1982, Singkol began receiving letters from a Japanese named Haruko Kitamura.
