= César Ruiz Aquino =

Filipino poet and novelist

- Education: Silliman University; Ateneo de Manila University; University of the Philippines Diliman
- Occupations: Poet, novelist

César Ruiz Aquino is a Filipino poet and novelist. He was born and raised in Zamboanga, Philippines. He was educated at Silliman University, at UP Diliman, at the Ateneo de Manila on Padre Faura, and at AE (now Universidad de Zamboanga). His writing career began when Philippine Graphic published his story 'Noon and Summer' written in 1961. At age 19, he received an invitation to - and a virtual writing fellowship at - the first, 1962, Silliman National Writers Summer Workshop in Dumaguete that included as fellows Wilfrido D. Nolledo, Jose Lansang Jr. and Wilfredo Pascua Sanchez - as well as mentors Nick Joaquin, Franz Arcellana and Edilberto Tiempo and Edith Tiempo.

Aquino wrote his dissertation under Edith Tiempo, entitled Poetry as Mythos: The Fallacy of the Rational Heritage and earned his Ph.D. at Silliman University, where he has been teaching creative writing and literature since 1981. He has also served resident panelist at the continuing annual Silliman Writers Workshop. He has received the Carlos Palanca Memorial Award for poetry two times (1978, 1997) and likewise two times for short fiction (1979, 1989). Other literary awards he has won are the Graphic and the Free Press. He has received the Gawad Pambansang Alagad ni Balagtas for Lifetime Achievement from the 'Unyon ng mga Manunulat sa Pilipinas' (Writers' Union of the Philippines or UMPIL) in 1997. He was also named 'National Fellow for Poetry' by the University of the Philippines Institute of Creative Writing (U .P. ICW) in 2003. The following year (2004) he was the Philippine awardee of the SEA.Write in Thailand.

Cesar Ruiz Aquino's publications include: 'Chronicles of Suspicion' (short fiction and nonfiction, from Kalikasan Press in 1988). 'Word Without End' (poems, from Anvil Publishing in 1993) aessnd 'Checkmeta: The Cesar Ruiz Aquino Reader' (poems and prose, from Midtown Printing Company in 2004). 'In Samarkand' (poems, from UST Publishing House in 2008). 'Caesuras: 155 New Poems' (UST Publishing House 2013). 'Like A Shadow That Only Fits A Figure Of Which It Is Not The Shadow' (UST Publishing House 2014). 'Fire If It Were Ice, Ice If It Were Fire' (Ateneo de Naga Press 2016).

He has two works-in-progress: a new book of poems and a novel.
