= Mass (novel) =

Historical-Political novel by F. Sionil Jose

- Book cover for F. Sionil José's novel Mass.
- Author: F. Sionil José
- Language: English
- Genre: Fiction
- Publisher: Solidaridad Publishing House, Inc. (Philippines)
- Publication date: 1973
- Publication place: Philippines

Mass, also known as Mass: A Novel, is a 1973 historical and political novel written by Filipino National Artist F. Sionil José. Together with The Pretenders, Mass is the completion of José's The Rosales Saga, which is also known as the Rosales Novels. The literary message of Mass was "a society intent only on calculating a man's price is one that ultimately devalues all men".

== Description ==
The narrative of Mass pictures the Philippines during the years prior to and after the imposition of Martial Law in 1972. It depicts a movement advocating reform, the resulting struggle for human rights, students’ rights, tenants’ rights, and women's rights, and mass protests that were manipulated by "fraudulent leaders". The uprising fails, and one of the characters goes back to Central Luzon to discover his origins in order to rebuild his life.

== Characters ==
The main character of Mass is José “Pepe” Samson, a resident of Tondo, Manila. He is the illegitimate son of Antonio “Tony” Samson, the primary character in José's The Pretenders. Pepe is also the great-grandson of Istak, the principal protagonist in José's Po-on. Instead of becoming like his father who was enticed by wealth, Pepe became a follower of a former commander of the Hukbalahap(Hukbong Bayan Laban sa Hapon) rebels, turned local affairs devotee and student leader in Manila. Pepe Samson is raised by Emy in Cabugawan, then goes to live with an aunt in Manila in order to study in college. He becomes a drug dealer for a gangster named Kuya Nick. After leaving the illegal job, Pepe joins the revolutionary group known as The Brotherhood. In the end, Pepe commits a "revolutionary act". Other characters included student activists, members of the women's liberation movement, drug addicts, and intellectuals. Some characters are from previous novels of The Rosales Saga.
