= F. Sionil José =

Filipino writer (1924–2022)

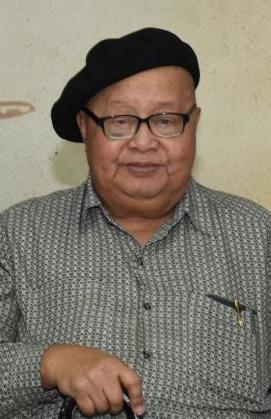
- José in 2017
- Born: Francisco Sionil José; December 3, 1924; Rosales, Pangasinan, Philippine Islands
- Died: January 6, 2022 (aged 97); Makati, Metro Manila, Philippines
- Education: Far Eastern University; University of Santo Tomas (dropped out)
- Occupations: Filipino Novelist, Writer, Journalist
- Spouse: Tessie Jovellanos Jose
- Writing career
- Pen name: F. Sionil José
- Period: 1962–2022
- Genre: Fiction
- Notable work: The "Rosales Saga" Novels (1962–1984)
- Notable awards: Order of National Artists of the Philippines Pablo Neruda Centennial Award (2004); Chevalier dans l'Ordre des Arts et Lettres (2000); Ramon Magsaysay Award for Journalism, Literature and Creative Communication Arts (1980); City of Manila Award for Literature (1979); Carlos Palanca Memorial Award for Literature (1959, 1979, 1980, 1981)
- Movement: Philippine literature in English

Francisco Sionil José (December 3, 1924 – January 6, 2022) was a Filipino writer who was one of the most widely read in the English language. A National Artist of the Philippines for Literature, which was bestowed upon him in 2001, José's novels and short stories depict the social underpinnings of class struggles and colonialism in Filipino society. His works—written in English—have been translated into 28 languages, including Korean, Indonesian, Czech, Russian, Latvian, Ukrainian and Dutch. He was often considered the leading Filipino candidate for the Nobel Prize in Literature.

== Early life ==
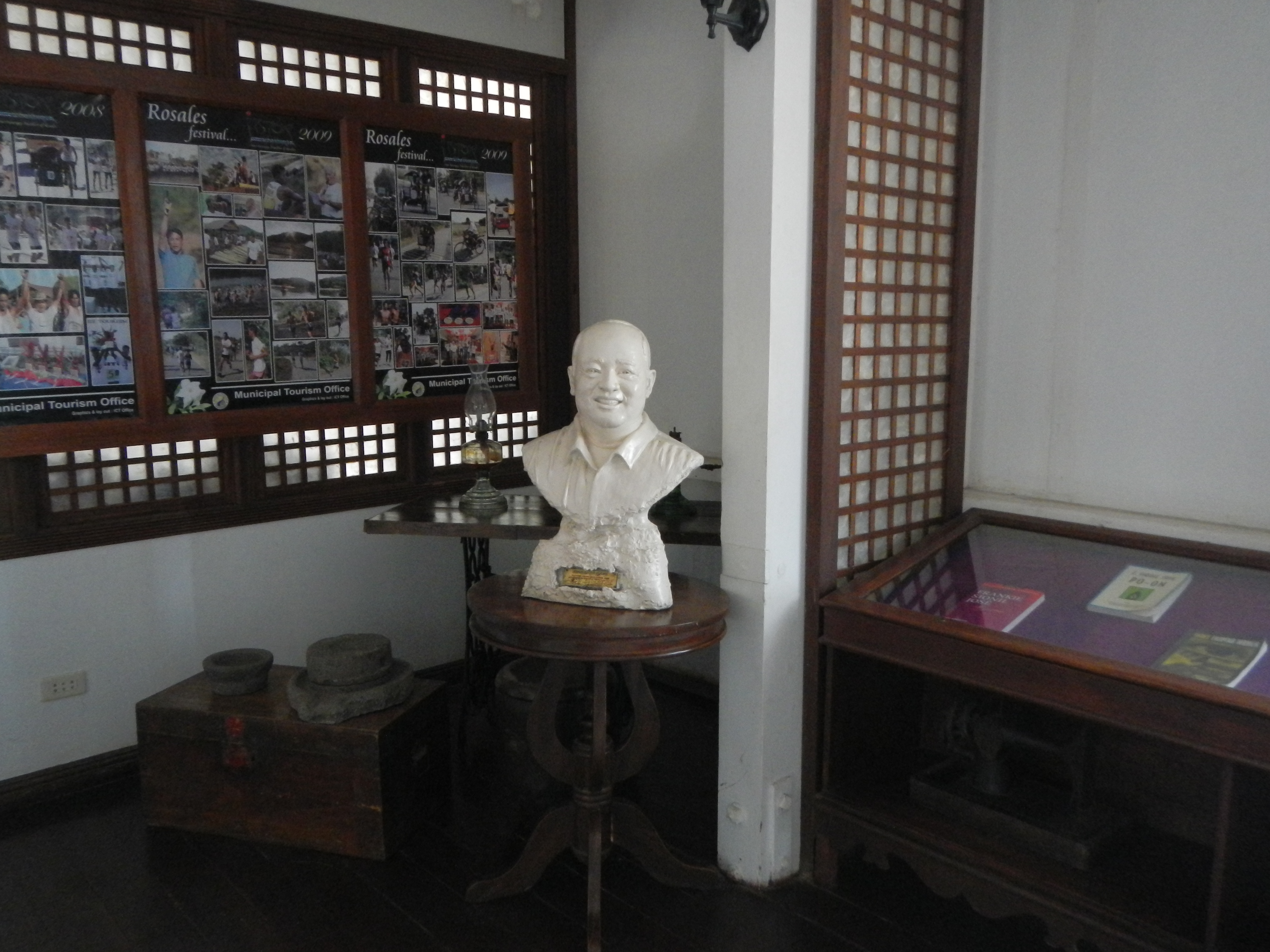
F. Sionil José Bust monument (Rosales, Pangasinan Presidencia).

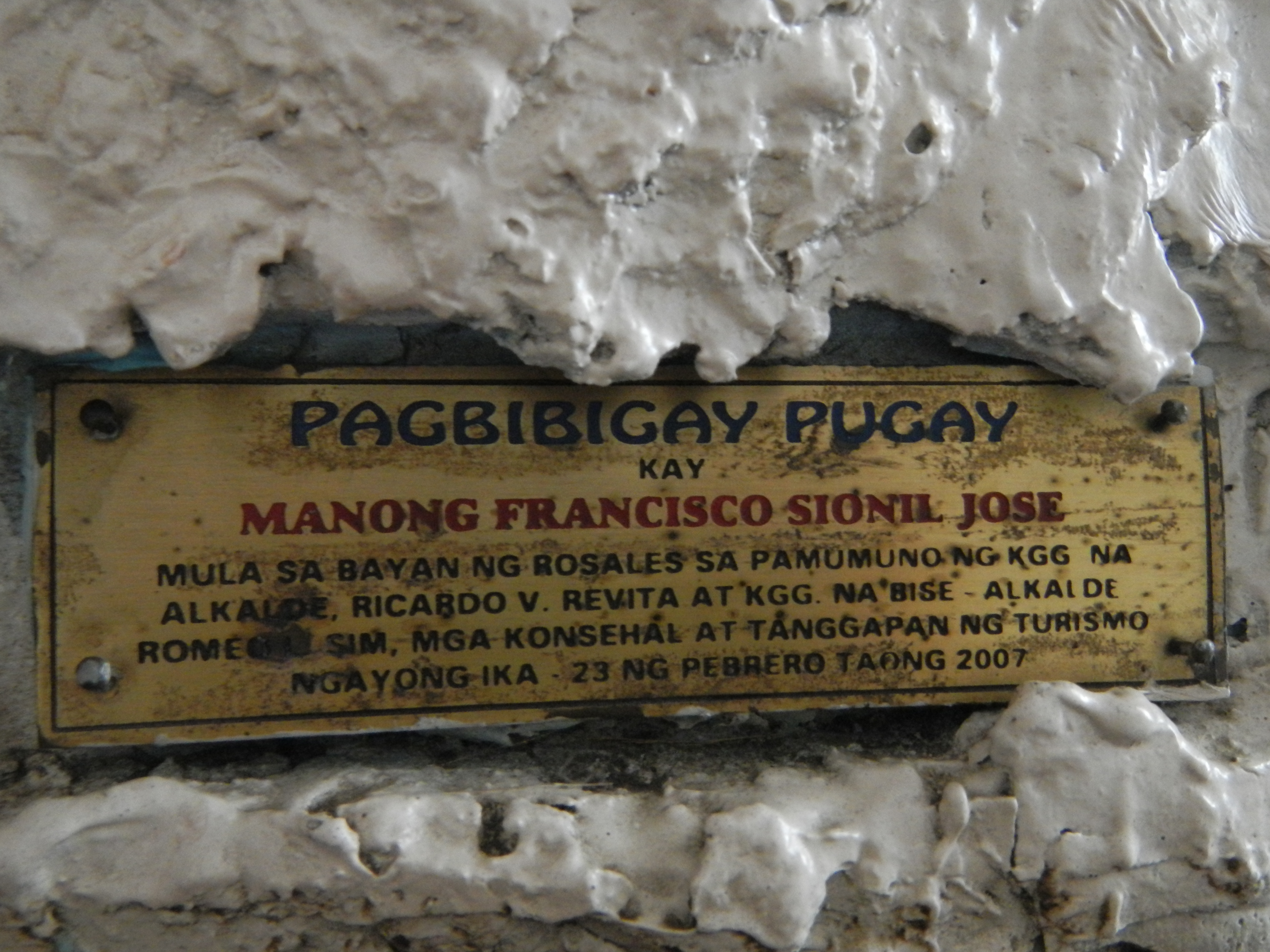
The Inscription in the Monument (February 23, 2007).

José was born in Rosales, Pangasinan, the setting of many of his stories. He spent his childhood in Barrio Cabugawan, Rosales, where he first began to write. José is of Ilocano descent whose family had migrated to Pangasinan prior to his birth. Fleeing poverty, his forefathers traveled from Ilocos towards Cagayan Valley through the Santa Fe Trail. Like many migrant families, they brought their lifetime possessions with them, including uprooted molave posts of their old houses and their alsong, a stone mortar for pounding rice.

One of the greatest influences to José was his industrious mother who went out of her way to get him the books he loved to read, while making sure her family did not go hungry despite poverty and landlessness. José started writing in grade school, at the time he started reading. In the fifth grade, one of José's teachers opened the school library to her students, which is how José managed to read the novels of José Rizal, Willa Cather’s My Antonia, Faulkner and Steinbeck. Reading about Basilio and Crispin in Rizal's Noli Me Tangere made the young José cry, because injustice was not an alien thing to him. When José was five years old, his grandfather who was a soldier during the Philippine revolution, had once tearfully showed him the land their family had once tilled but was taken away by rich mestizo landlords who knew how to work the system against illiterates like his grandfather.

== Writing career ==
José attended the University of Santo Tomas after World War II, but dropped out and plunged into writing and journalism in Manila. In subsequent years, he edited various literary and journalistic publications, started a publishing house, and founded the Philippine branch of PEN, an international organization for writers. José received numerous awards for his work. The Pretenders is his most popular novel, which is the story of one man's alienation from his poor background and the decadence of his wife's wealthy family.

José Rizal's life and writings profoundly influenced José's work. The five volume Rosales Saga, in particular, employs and integrates themes and characters from Rizal's work. Throughout his career, José's writings espouse social justice and change to better the lives of average Filipino families. He is one of the most critically acclaimed Filipino authors internationally, although much underrated in his own country because of his authentic Filipino English and his anti-elite views.

"Authors like myself choose the city as a setting for their fiction because the city itself illustrates the progress or the sophistication that a particular country has achieved. Or, on the other hand, it might also reflect the kind of decay, both social and perhaps moral, that has come upon a particular people."

— F. Sionil José, BBC.com, 30 July 2003

José also owned Solidaridad Bookshop, located on Padre Faura Street in Ermita, Manila. The bookshop offers mostly hard-to-find books and Filipiniana reading materials previously curated by his wife, Teresita, and foreign selections previously curated by himself. It is said to be one of the favorite haunts of many local writers.

In his regular column, Hindsight, in The Philippine STAR, dated September 12, 2011, he wrote "Why we are shallow", blaming the decline of Filipino intellectual and cultural standards on a variety of modern amenities, including media, the education system—particularly the loss of emphasis on classic literature and the study of Greek and Latin—and the abundance and immediacy of information on the Internet.

Nominated on numerous occasions for the Nobel Prize in Literature, the Nobel Library of the Swedish Academy possesses 39 copies of Sionil José's works in English and French translations.

In May 2021, José stirred up controversy after publicly backing President Rodrigo Duterte amid his Philippine drug war. José referred to Duterte as someone who "may yet be, next to Magsaysay, the best president we ever had", adding that under Duterte's term, the Philippines, he claims, was safer. Around 30,000 Filipinos, including children, were killed under the drug war initiated by Duterte. The Philippines also fell to 138th in the 2021 World Press Freedom Index under his watch. Duterte was later arrested by the International Criminal Court for crimes against humanity in 2025.

== Death ==
José died on the night of January 6, 2022, aged 97, at the Makati Medical Center, where he was scheduled for an angioplasty the next day.

== Awards ==
Five of José's works have won the Carlos Palanca Memorial Awards for Literature: his short stories The God Stealer in 1959, Waywaya in 1979, Arbol de Fuego (Firetree) in 1980, his novel Mass in 1981, and his essay A Scenario for Philippine Resistance in 1979.

Since the 1980s, various award-giving bodies have feted José with awards for his outstanding works and for being an outstanding Filipino in the field of literature. His first award was the 1979 City of Manila Award for Literature which was presented to him by Manila Mayor Ramon Bagatsing. The following year, he was given the prestigious Ramon Magsaysay Award for Journalism, Literature and Creative Communication Arts. Among his other awards during that period include the Outstanding Fulbrighters Award for Literature (1988) and the Cultural Center of the Philippines Award (Gawad para sa Sining) for Literature (1989).

By the turn of the century, José continued to receive recognition from several award-giving bodies. These include the Cultural Center of the Philippines Centennial Award in 1999, the prestigious Ordre des Arts et des Lettres in 2000, and the Order of Sacred Treasure (Kun Santo Zuiho Sho) in 2001. In that same year, the Philippine government bestowed upon him the prestigious title of National Artist for Literature for his outstanding contributions to Philippine literature. In 2004, José garnered the coveted Pablo Neruda Centennial Award in Chile.

== Works ==
=== Rosales Saga novels ===
A five-novel series that spans three centuries of Philippine history, translated into 22 languages:

- Po-on (Source) (1984) ISBN 971-8845-10-0
- Tree (1978) ISBN 971-8845-14-3
- My Brother, My Executioner (1973) ISBN 971-8845-16-X
- The Pretenders (1962) ISBN 971-8845-00-3
- Mass (December 31, 1974) ISBN 0-86861-572-2

=== Original novels containing the Rosales Saga ===
- Source (Po-on) (1993) ISBN 0-375-75144-0
- Don Vicente (1980) ISBN 0-375-75243-9 – Tree and My Brother, My Executioner combined in one book
- The Samsons ISBN 0-375-75244-7 The Pretenders and Mass combined in one book

=== Other novels ===
- Gagamba (The Spider Man) (1991) ISBN 978-971-536-105-7
- Viajero (1993) ISBN 978-971-8845-04-2
- Sin (1973)/(1996) ISBN 0-517-28446-4
- Ben Singkol (2001) ISBN 971-8845-32-1
- Ermita (1988) ISBN 971-8845-12-7
- Vibora! (2007)
- Sherds (2008)
- Muse and Balikbayan: Two Plays (2008)
- The Feet of Juan Bacnang (2011)

=== Novellas ===
- Three Filipino Women (1992) ISBN 9780307830289
- Two Filipino Women (1981) ISBN 9711001136

=== Short story collections ===
- Collected Short Stories (2022) ISBN 978-9-718-84572-1
- Short Stories (with Introduction and Teaching Guide by Thelma B. Kintanar) (2008)
- The God Stealer and Other Stories (2001) ISBN 971-8845-35-6
- Puppy Love and Thirteen Short Stories (March 15, 1998) ISBN 971-8845-26-7 and ISBN 978-971-8845-26-4
- Olvidon and Other Stories (1988) ISBN 971-8845-18-6
- Platinum: Ten Filipino Stories (1983) ISBN 971-8845-22-4 (now out of print, its stories are added to the new version of Olvidon and Other Stories)
- Waywaya: Eleven Filipino Short Stories (1980) ISBN 99922-884-0-X
- Asian PEN Anthology (as editor) (1966)
- Short Story International (SSI): Tales by the World's Great Contemporary Writers (Unabridged, Volume 13, Number 75) (co-author, 1989) ISBN 1-55573-042-6

=== Children's books ===
- The Molave and The Orchid (November 2004)

=== Verses ===
- Questions (1988) ISBN 978-9-718-84574-5

=== Essays and non-fiction ===
- Literature and Liberation (co-author) (1988)
- In Search of the Word (De La Salle University Press, March 15, 1998) ISBN 971-555-264-1 and ISBN 978-971-555-264-6
- We Filipinos: Our Moral Malaise, Our Heroic Heritage (1999) ISBN 978-9-718-84530-1
- Soba, Senbei and Shibuya: A Memoir of Post-War Japan (2000) ISBN 971-8845-31-3 and ISBN 978-971-8845-31-8
- Why We are Poor: Heroes in the Attic, Termites in the Sala (2005) ISBN 978-9-718-84541-7
- This I Believe: Gleanings from a Life in Literature (2006)
- Why We are Hungry: Rats in the Kitchen, Carabaos in the Garden (2008) ISBN 978-9-718-84549-3
- Promdi: An Ilokano Biography (2021) ISBN 978-9-718-84571-4
- Writing the Nation: Essays on Philippine Literature, Politics, and Culture (2021) ISBN 978-9-718-84570-7

=== In translation ===
- Zajatec bludného kruhu (The Pretenders) (Translated into Czech by Veronika Veisová) (Svoboda, 1981)
- Po-on (Translated into Tagalog by Lilia F. Antonio) (De La Salle University Press, 1998) ISBN 971-555-267-6 and ISBN 978-971-555-267-7
- Puno (Tree) (Translated into Tagalog by Aurora E. Batnag) (Solidaridad Publishing House, 2017) ISBN 978-9-718-84565-3
- Aking Kapatid, Aking Berdugo (My Brother, My Executioner) (Translated into Tagalog by Jun Cruz Reyes) (Solidaridad Publishing House, 2018) ISBN 978-9-718-84566-0
- Mga Mapagpanggap (The Pretenders) (Translated into Tagalog by Rogelio Mangahas) (Solidaridad Publishing House, 2019) ISBN 978-9-718-84567-7
- Masa (Mass) (Translated into Tagalog by Lualhati Bautista) (Solidaridad Publishing House, 2014) ISBN 978-9-718-84562-2, 978-9-718-84561-5
- Anochecer (Littera) (Po-on) (Translated into Spanish by Carlos Milla Soler) (Maeva, October 2003) ISBN 84-95354-95-0 and ISBN 978-84-95354-95-2

=== In anthologies ===
- Tong (a short story from Brown River, White Ocean: An Anthology of Twentieth-Century Philippine Literature in English by Luis Francia, Rutgers University Press, August 1993) ISBN 0-8135-1999-3 and ISBN 978-0-8135-1999-9

=== In film documentaries ===
- Francisco Sionil José – A Filipino Odyssey by Art Makosinski (Documentary, in color, 28min, 16mm. Winner of the Golden Shortie for Best Documentary at the 1996 Victoria Film and Video Festival)

== Reviews ==
"...the foremost Filipino novelist in English... his novels deserve a much wider readership than the Philippines can offer. His major work, the Rosales saga, can be read as an allegory for the Filipino in search of an identity..."

— Ian Buruma, The New York Review of Books

"Sionil José writes English prose with a passion that, at its best moments, transcends the immediate scene. (He) is a masterful short story writer..."

— Christine Chapman, International Herald Tribune, Paris

"...America has no counterpart to José – no one who is simultaneously a prolific novelist, a social and political organizer, and a small scale entrepreneur...José's identity has equipped him to be fully sensitive to the nation's miseries without succumbing, like many of his characters to corruption or despair...

— James Fallows, The Atlantic Monthly

"...The reader of his well crafted stories will learn more about the Philippines, its people and its concerns than from any journalistic account or from a holiday trip there. José's books takes us to the heart of the Filipino mind and soul, to the strengths and weaknesses of its men, women, and culture.

— Lynne Bundesen, Los Angeles Times

== See also ==
- Philippine literature in Spanish
- Philippine literature in English
- Literature of the Philippines
- Philippine English
- Thomasites
- Philinda Rand
- Stevan Javellana
