= The Rosales Saga =

Novel series by F. Sionil José

- Book covers for F. Sionil José's novel series The Rosales Saga.
- Author: F. Sionil José
- Language: English
- Genre: Fiction
- Publisher: Solidaridad Publishing House, Inc. (Philippines)
- Publication place: Philippines

The Rosales Saga, also known as the Rosales Novels, is a series of five historical and political novels written by National Artist of the Philippines F. Sionil José. Chronologically, it is composed of five interconnected novels, namely Po-on (written in 1984), Tree (written in 1978), My Brother, My Executioner (written in 1973), The Pretenders (written in 1962), and Mass (written in 1973). The Rosales Saga traced the five generations of two families, namely the Samsons (poor farmers) and the Asperri (wealthy mestizos) through Spanish and American periods in the history of the Philippines until the period after Philippine Independence. José begun writing the series in 1962 and completed it in 1984.

== General description ==
All of José’s five novels are in set in Rosales, Pangasinan in Luzon, Philippines. José uses a variation of styles for the novels. José also focuses on different families with different social statuses. The object that connects and binds these families is the "giant Balete tree" located at the plaza of Rosales town.

Among the common themes in the Rosales Novels are the intimate relationships and marriages between cousins, the father figure who is beaten up by the political and social structures, vengeful and aggressive attacks on persons who symbolize repression and subjugation, the love-hate relationship between the characters and the town of Rosales, as well as its barrios such as Cabugawan, Carmay and Sipnget.

== Narrative sequence ==
=== Po-on ===
The fifth and last novel in the Rosales series, Po-on, focuses on the Samson family. The novel is set during the Philippine–American War, when revolution and nationalism were presented as the solution to the social and political problems in the Philippines. Po-On is chronologically the first novel of the saga.

=== Tree ===
The fourth novel, ⁣Tree, pursues the life of the unnamed grandson of Don Jacinto, the overseer of the Asperris and protector of the Samsons in Po-on. The unnamed narrator witnesses the adversity of the Filipino peasants under the encomienda system during the Spanish colonial regime, as well as the resulting uprisings created by the peasants. However, the nameless storyteller is unable to free himself from his own position that carries cultural and economic benefits. Tree is chronologically the second novel of the saga.

The succeeding three books after Tree reinforce the existing strain between Philippine colonial heritage and bona fide patriotism.

=== My Brother, My Executioner ===
The third novel, My Brother, My Executioner, concentrates on the life of Luis Asperri and his half-brother Victor during the 1950s, a time that was plagued with the Hukbalahap rebellion. Luis Asperri is the illegitimate son of Don Vicente Asperri. Don Asperri takes Luis Asperri as an heir due to the absence of a legitimate son by the former. Luis abandons his peasant roots in order to embrace the status of a landowner. His half-brother Victor warns Luis that if the peasantry does not receive economic justice, the Hukbalahap insurgents would annihilate the elite class. In the end, Luis expects his demise at the hands of the Hukbalahap rebels. My Brother, My Executioner is chronologically the third novel of the saga.

=== The Pretenders ===
The first novel, The Pretenders (novel), recalls the life of Antonio “Tony” Samson. Antonio Samson obtains a PhD degree from Harvard University in the United States. By marrying a rich Filipina mestiza, Antonio Samson becomes an Ilustrado and works for his father-in-law. As a result, Antonio Samson is unable to marry his true love and cousin, Emy, with whom he sired an illegitimate son. Feeling undeserving of Emy and his son because of his denunciation of his peasant origins, Antonio Samson commits suicide. The Pretenders is chronologically the fourth novel of the saga.

=== Mass ===
In the second Rosales novel to be published, Mass, the timeline jumps forward into the 1970s, to narrate the life of Pepe Samson, the illegitimate son of Antonio Samson and his cousin Emy. Pepe Samson moves to Manila to attend college. He becomes a member of a revolutionary group called The Brotherhood. The novel ends with a scene with Pepe leaving Manila to adhere to the cause of the mountain guerrillas. Mass is chronologically the fifth novel of the saga.

== Connection with Viajero ==
In José’s separate novel Viajero, which is not a part of the Rosales Saga series, Pepe Samson reappears as a full-fledged insurgent, while some other Rosales Novels characters also resurface.
