= Silliman National Writers Workshop =

The Silliman University National Writers Workshop (SUNWW) is an annual creative writing workshop that was established in 1962 by the late Edilberto K. Tiempo and National Artist for Literature Edith L. Tiempo of Silliman University.

The SUNWW is the longest-running creative writing workshop in Asia. It is commonly regarded as the most prestigious one in the entire region, having been able to produce many of the most influential and renowned names in Philippine literature.

Practically all Filipino writers of any importance have joined the Silliman Writers Workshop at one time or another, either as fellows, lecturers, or panelists. Being a pioneer, the Silliman Writers Workshop occupies a premier position in the history of creative writing in the Philippines.

== History ==
The Silliman University National Writers Workshop in Dumaguete is the oldest creative writing program in Asia. In 2009, Dr. Edith Tiempo was named Director Emeritus of the National Writers Workshop.

Apart from Silliman University, over the years the Workshop has received support from the Ford Foundation, the National Commission for Culture and the Arts (NCCA), the CAP Family of Companies, the Creative Writing Foundation, the Dumaguete Literary Arts (DuLA) Group, and various cultural institutes based in the United States and Europe.

Last 2010 marked a milestone in the development of Philippine literature and the writing craft, as the Silliman University National Writers Workshop, headed by its first director-in-residence, Dr. Rowena Tiempo-Torrevillas, and the visionary Dr. Ben S. Malayang III, University President, first invited a writer beyond the Philippines to sit in as a guest panelist for a week to enrich the workshop by infusing Asian consciousness. The first international guest writer was Hong Kong's Xu Xi. For 2011, it is Singapore's Kirpal Singh. For 2012, it is Nathan Aw Ming Kun from the Singapore Management University (SMU).

Also in 2010, Silliman University welcomed the panelists, writing fellows, workshop alumni, and guests to the Writers Village at Camp Lookout, Valencia.

Due to decreases in budgetary allocations, the Silliman National Writers Workshop (for some time) disassociated itself from Silliman University, and started to get its funding from the National Commission of Culture and Arts (NCCA). Its name was changed to the Dumaguete National Writers Workshop. In 2008, however, the organization of the workshop returned to Silliman University's English Department, with additional support from the NCCA, as well as local businesses from Dumaguete and other literature and art enthusiasts. Eventually, the workshop was rechristened with the name Silliman University National Writers Workshop.

In 2012, the SUNWW was given the Tanging Parangal in the Gawad CCP Para sa Sining by the Cultural Center of the Philippines, the highest distinction given by CCP in recognition of an individual or an organization's contributions to Philippine arts and culture.

== Legacy ==
The SUNWW has trained several generations of writers, many of whom are now influencing the shape, direction, and development of Philippine literature. Many of the SUNWW alumni have won prestigious literary prizes such as the Don Carlos Palanca Memorial Awards for Literature, the Nick Joaquin Literary Awards, and the Philippines Free Press Literary Contest, among others.

== Fellowship ==
The SUNWW draws numerous applicants from the entire country to compete for the fellowship. Fellowships are offered to emerging Filipino writers in various genres namely fiction, poetry, creative nonfiction, and drama.

The first screening panel, composed of several members of the Creative Writing Foundation, selects the writing fellows for the summer based on the manuscripts submitted by the applicants. These selected manuscripts are forwarded to the director of the workshop, who does the final screening and facilitates the deliberation before approving the final lineup of writing fellows.

The writing fellowship covers board and lodging for the full 22 days of the duration of the entire workshop. The SUNWW is held for three weeks every summer in the Mary Rose Lamb Sobrepeña Writers Village, Dumaguete.
