= The Man Who (Thought He) Looked Like Robert Taylor =

1983 short story by Bienvenido Santos

- Book cover for Bienvenido Santos's The Man Who (Thought He) Looked Like Robert Taylor.
- Author: Bienvenido Santos
- Language: English
- Genre: Fiction
- Publication place: Philippines

The Man Who (Thought He) Looked Like Robert Taylor (1983) is a book written by Philippine-American novelist and short story author, Bienvenido Santos. The title basically imparts that the protagonist of the novel lived believing that he has a semblance to his idolized American actor, Robert Taylor. This fiction by Santos is regarded as one of the finest examples of exceptional English-language writings about the personal, emotional, and moving experiences of Filipino migrants in America.

== Description ==
The story is about a Filipino immigrant named Solomon King, a man who was born in Sulucan, a town in the Philippines. Moving to the United States, he lived by himself in Chicago for thirty years. While in America, although he kept mementos from his Philippine hometown, he felt alienated and ignored while surrounded by Polish people living in Chicago. Aging as he was, he decided to travel to Washington, D.C. to search for earlier acquaintances. He, together with other Filipinos of his generation, became further estranged by "better educated" Filipinos he encountered along the way, adding to his bitterness in experiencing a weakening in the "spirit of ethnic unity".

== Historical background ==
The Man Who (Thought He) Looked Like Robert Taylor is a literary discourse illustrating the yearning of many Filipinos to go and reside in America despite hardships, and the "loneliness and sense of exile" they experienced while being in the United States after World War II through the 1970s. Among Santos's characters, apart from the men, are female émigrés who "were prepared to do almost anything" in order to have a better life in America.

== Excerpts ==
An excerpt from The Man Who (Thought He) Looked Like Robert Taylor is a short story entitled "Immigration Blues", which became anthologized in Santos's short-story collection, Scent of Apples. This short story was a recipient of a New Letters award for fiction in 1977.

== Bibliography ==
- Ty, Eleanor. A Filipino Prufrock in an Alien Land: Bienvenido Santos's The Man Who (Thought He) Looked Like Robert Taylor, Literature Interpretation Theory, 1545-5866, Volume 12, Issue 3, 2001, pages 267 – 283
