= Stevan Javellana =

Filipino writer (1918–1977)

Stevan Javellana (1918–1977) was a Filipino novelist and short story writer in the English language. He is also known as Esteban Javellana.

== Biography ==
Javellana was born in 1918 in Iloilo. He fought as a guerrilla during the Japanese invasion of the Philippines. After World War II, he graduated from the University of the Philippines College of Law in 1948, and practiced law for several years. He stayed in the United States afterwards but he died in the Visayas in 1977 at the age of 59.

== Writing career ==
Javellana was the author of a best-selling war novel in the United States and Manila, Without Seeing the Dawn, published by Little, Brown and Company in Boston in 1947. His short stories were published in the Manila Times Magazine in the 1950s, among which are Two Tickets to Manila, The Sin of Father Anselmo, Sleeping Tablets, The Fifth Man, The Tree of Peace and Transition. Without Seeing the Dawn, also known as The Lost Ones, is his only novel. The novel is also a requirement for the Grade 7 students of the University of the Philippines Rural High School.

== See also ==
- Javellana, a family from the Philippines.
- Philippine literature in English
- Literature of the Philippines
- Philippine English
