= Bienvenido Santos =

Filipino novelist

Bienvenido N. Santos
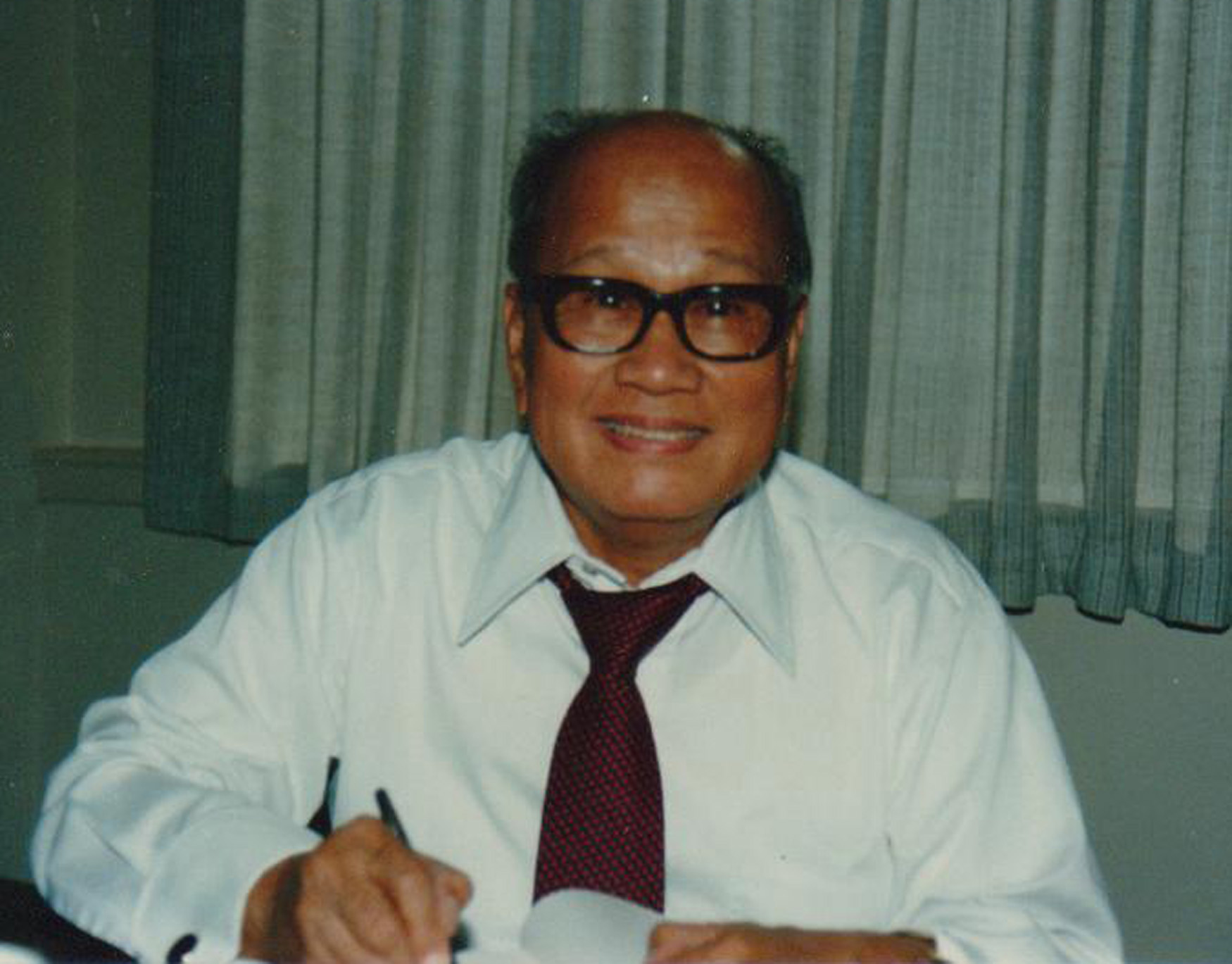
- Born: March 22, 1911; Tondo, Manila, Philippine Islands
- Died: January 7, 1996 (aged 84); Legazpi City, Albay, Philippines
- Writing career
- Period: 20th century
- Genres: fiction, poetry
- Notable work: Scent of Apples
- Notable awards: Carlos Palanca Memorial Awards (1956, 1961, 1965); Republic Cultural Heritage Award in Literature; American Book Award (1980); Guggenheim Foundation Fellowship

Bienvenido Nuqui Santos (March 22, 1911 – January 7, 1996) was a Filipino-American fiction, poetry and nonfiction writer. He was born and raised in Tondo, Manila. His family roots are originally from Lubao, Pampanga, Philippines. He lived in the United States for many years where he is widely credited as a pioneering Asian-American writer.

== Biography ==
Santos received his Bachelor of Arts degree from the University of the Philippines where he first studied creative writing under Paz Marquez Benitez. In 1941, Santos was a government pensionado (scholar) to the United States at the University of Illinois, Columbia University, and Harvard University. He had arrived in San Francisco on October 12, 1941, aboard the Ruth Alexander leaving his wife and three daughters in the Philippines. When war in the Pacific came to the Philippines on December 8 (December 7 Hawaii time) he feared he would never see his family again—a reality that "not only interrupted his study of realism; it was overwhelming it" leading to a transformation in his sense of national consciousness and identity. That crisis changed the nature of his writing into a less carefree style to one mixing laughter and pain; described by Florentino Valeros as "a man hiding tears in his laughter."

During World War II, he served with the Philippine government in exile under President Manuel L. Quezon in Washington, D.C., together with the playwright Severino Montano and Philippine National Artist Jose Garcia Villa. Santos left for home on January 17, 1946, aboard the Uruguay arriving in early February. (Note: Espiritu has "January 17, 1945" but others note Santos returned in 1946 and Uruguay was in the Atlantic at that time. There is a recorded voyage to Manila and Yokohama departing San Francisco on January 17, 1946.)

In 1967, he returned to the United States to become a teacher and university administrator. He received a Rockefeller fellowship at the Writers Workshop of the University of Iowa where he later taught as a Fulbright exchange professor. Santos has also received a Guggenheim Foundation fellowship, a Republic Cultural Heritage Award in Literature as well as several Palanca Awards for his short stories. Scent of Apples won a 1980 American Book Award from the Before Columbus Foundation.

Santos received an honorary doctorate degrees in humanities and letters from the University of the Philippines, and Bicol University (Legazpi City, Albay) in 1981. He was also a professor of Creative Writing and Distinguished Writer in Residence at the Wichita State University from 1973 to 1982, at which time the university awarded him an honorary doctorate degree in humane letters. After his retirement, Santos became Visiting Writer and Artist at De La Salle University in Manila; the university honored Santos by renaming its creative writing center after him.

== Works ==
=== Novels ===
- The Volcano (1965)
- Villa Magdalena (1965)
- The Praying Man (1982)
- The Man Who (Thought He) Looked Like Robert Taylor (1983)
- What the Hell for You Left Your Heart in San Francisco? (1987)

=== Short story collections ===
- You Lovely People (1955)
- Brother, My Brother (1960)
- The Day the Dancers Came (1967, 1991)
- Scent of Apples (1979)
- Dwell in the Wilderness (1985)
- The Old Favorites
- Courage (1990's)
- Even Purple Hearts

=== Poetry ===
- The Wounded Stag (1956,1992)
- Distances: In Time (1983)
- "March of Death"
- Music for One
- Come Home, Heroes

=== Nonfiction ===
- Memory's Fictions: A Personal History (1993)
- Postscript to a Saintly Life (1994)
- Selected Letters: Book 1 (1995)
- Selected Letters: Book 2 (1996)
- Selected Letters: Book 3 (1997)
- Selected Letters: Book 4 (1998)

== Awards, honors and prizes ==
- Rockefeller Foundation Fellowship at the University of Iowa
- Guggenheim Fellowship
- Republic Cultural Heritage Award
- Carlos Palanca Memorial Awards for short fiction (1956, 1961 and 1965)
- Fulbright Program Exchange Professorship
- American Book Award from Before Columbus Foundation
- Honorary Doctorate in Humanities and Letters, University of the Philippines
- Honorary Doctorate in Humanities and Letters, Bicol University (Legazpi City, Albay, Philippines)
- Honorary Doctorate in Humane Letters, Wichita State University (Kansas, U.S.)

== See also ==
- List of Asian American writers

== Critical studies ==
As of March 2001:

1. On Loss: Anticipating a Future for Asian American Studies By: Shiu, Anthony Sze-Fai; MELUS: The Journal of the Society for the Study of the Multi-Ethnic Literature of the United States, 2006 Spring; 31 (1): 3-33.
2. Bienvenido N. Santos: 1911-1996 By: Tensuan, Theresa M. Asian American Writers; Dictionary of Literary Biography, DLB, Vol. 312. Madsen, Deborah L. & Matthew J. Bruccoli, ed. Detroit, MI: Gale; 2005. pp. 273–78
3. Up from Benevolent Assimilation: At Home with the Manongs of Bienvenido Santos By: Bascara, Victor; MELUS: The Journal of the Society for the Study of the Multi-Ethnic Literature of the United States, 2004 Spring; 29 (1): 61–78.
4. A Filipino Prufrock in an Alien Land: Bienvenido Santos's The Man Who (Thought He) Looked Like Robert Taylor By: Ty, Eleanor; Lit: Literature Interpretation Theory, 2001 Sept; 12 (3): 267–83.
5. Bienvenido N. Santos (1911–1996) By: Mannur, Anita. IN: Nelson, Asian American Novelists: A Bio-Bibliographical Critical Sourcebook. Westport, CT: Greenwood; 2000. pp. 317–22
6. Themes in the Poetry of Bienvenido Santos By: Rico, Victoria. IN: Garcia, The Likhaan Book of Philippine Criticism. Quezon City, Philippines: U of the Philippines P; 2000. pp. 174–96
7. Filipino Writing in the United States: Reclaiming Whose America? By: San Juan, E. Jr.. IN: Garcia, J. Neil C.; The Likhaan Book of Philippine Criticism. Quezon City, Philippines: U of the Philippines P; 2000. pp. 441–64
8. The Novels of Bienvenido N. Santos By: Grow, L. M.. Quezon City, Philippines: Giraffe; 1999.
9. Filipino American Literature By: Gonzalez, N. V. M.. IN: Cheung, An Interethnic Companion to Asian American Literature. Cambridge: Cambridge UP; 1996. pp. 62–124
10. You Lovely People: The Texture of Alienation By: Rico, Victoria S.; Philippine Studies, 1994; 42 (1): 91–104.
11. Marriage in Philippine-American Fiction By: Manuel, Dolores de; Philippine Studies, 1994; 42 (2): 210–16.
12. Themes in the Poetry of Bienvenido Santos By: Rico, Victoria; Philippine Studies, 1994; 42 (4): 452–74.
13. Split-Level Christianity in The Praying Man By: Puente, Lorenzo; Philippine Studies, 1992; 40 (1): 111–20.
14. The Myth and the Matrix in Bienvenido N. Santos' Scent of Apples: Searching for Harmony among Incongruities By: Valdez, Maria Stella; DLSU Dialogue, 1991; 25 (1): 73–86.
15. The Poet and the Garden: The Green World of Bienvenido N. Santos By: Grow, L. M.; World Literature Written in English, 1989 Spring; 29 (1): 136–145.
16. Echoes and Reflections in Villa Magdalena By: Vidal, Lourdes H.; Philippine Studies, 1987; 35 (3): 377–382.
17. Can These, Too, Be Midwestern? Studies of Two Filipino Writers By: Bresnahan, Roger J.; Midamerica: The Yearbook of the Society for the Study of Midwestern Literature, 1986; 8: 134–147.
18. Modern Philippine Poetry in the Formative Years: 1920-1950 By: Grow, L. M.; ARIEL: A Review of International English Literature, 1984 July; 15 (3): 81–98.
19. The Christian World-View of Bienvenido N. Santos By: Grow, L. M.; AUMLA: Journal of the Australasian Universities Language and Literature Association, 1983 Nov.; 60: 234–251.
20. The Midwestern Fiction of Bienvenido N. Santos By: Bresnahan, Roger J.; Society for the Study of Midwestern Literature Newsletter, 1983 Summer; 13 (2): 28–37.
21. Augusto F. Espiritu, "Fidelity and Shame: Bienvenido Santos," in Five Faces of Exile: The Nation and Filipino American Intellectuals. Stanford: Stanford University Press, 2005. pp. 139–178.
22. Bienvenido N. Santos: An Illustrated Bibliography By: Dickey, Paul E. Omaha, NE: Dickey Books; 2023. ISBN 9798892928656.
