= Edith Tiempo =

Filipino writer (1919–2011)

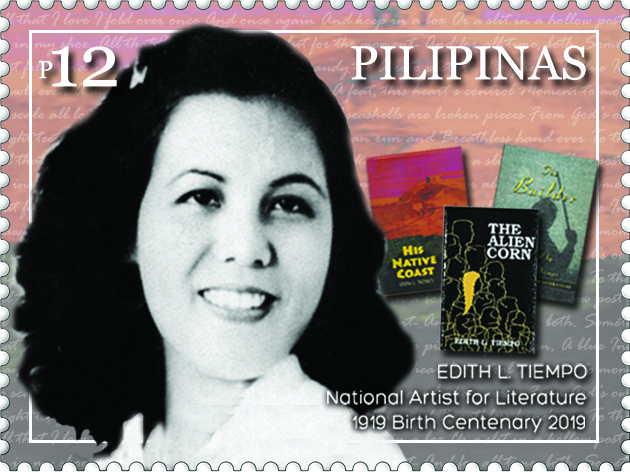
- Edith Tiempo on a 2019 stamp of the Philippines
- Born: Edith Cutaran Lopez; April 22, 1919; Bayombong, Nueva Vizcaya, Philippine Islands
- Died: August 21, 2011 (aged 92); Dumaguete, Negros Oriental, Philippines
- Education: Silliman University; State University of Iowa
- Spouse: Edilberto K. Tiempo
- Children: Maldon Tiempo & Rowena Tiempo Torrevillas
- Writing career
- Notable awards: Order of National Artists of the Philippines

Edith Cutaran Lopez-Tiempo (April 22, 1919 – August 21, 2011) was a Filipino poet, fiction writer, teacher and literary critic in the English language. She was conferred the National Artist Award for Literature in 1999.

== Biography ==
Tiempo was born in Bayombong, Nueva Vizcaya. Her poems are intricate verbal transfigurations of significant experiences as revealed, in two of her much anthologized pieces, "Halaman" and "Bonsai." As fictionist, Tiempo is as morally profound. Her language has been marked as "descriptive but unburdened by scrupulous detailing." She is an influential tradition in Philippine Literature in English. Together with her late husband, writer and critic Edilberto K. Tiempo, they founded (in 1962) and directed the Silliman National Writers Workshop in Dumaguete City, which has produced some of the Philippines' best writers.

Tiempo died on August 21, 2011.

== Works ==
=== Novels ===
- A Blade of Fern (1978)
- His Native Coast (1979)
- The Alien Corn (1992)
- One, Tilting Leaves (1995)
- The Builder (2004)
- The Jumong (2006)

=== Short story collections ===
- Abide, Joshua, and Other Stories (1964)

=== Poetry collections ===
- The Tracks of Babylon and Other Poems (1966)
- The Charmer's Box and Other Poet (1993)
- Marginal Annotations and Other Poems
- Commend Contend. Beyond Extensions (2010)

== Honors and awards ==
- National Artist Award for Literature (1999)
- Carlos Palanca Memorial Awards for Literature
- Cultural Center of the Philippines (1979, First Prize in Novel)
- Gawad Pambansang Alagad ni Balagtas (1988)
