= Edilberto K. Tiempo =

Filipino professor, writer (1913–1996)

Edilberto Kaindong Tiempo
- Born: August 5, 1913; Maasin City, Philippine Islands
- Died: September 19, 1996 (aged 83)
- Occupations: Writer and professor
- Spouse: Edith Tiempo

Academic work
- Institutions: Silliman University

Books by Edilberto K. Tiempo, including To Be Free and Snake Twin and Other Stories, displayed in an exhibition highlighting his contributions to Philippine literature.

Edilberto Kaindong Tiempo (August 5, 1913 – September 19, 1996) was a Filipino writer and professor. He and his wife, Edith L. Tiempo, are credited by Silliman University with establishing "a tradition in excellence in creative writing and the teaching of literacy craft which continues to this day" at that university.

== Career ==
During his tenure there, he was department chair (1950 to 1969), graduate school dean, vice-president for academic affairs, and writer-in-residence. Tiempo was also a part-time teacher at St. Paul University Dumaguete, where he taught fine arts, drama, and postgraduate courses.

As a Guggenheim writing fellow in 1955, he submitted a collection of short stories, A Stream at Dalton Pass and Other Stories, for his Ph.D. in English at the University of Denver. This collection won a prize at the same time that his second novel, More Than Conquerors, won the first prize for the novel.

Tiempo and his wife studied with Paul Engle in the Iowa Writers' Workshop, graduating in 1962; their experience there inspired them to found the Silliman National Writers Workshop, the first in Asia, which has been in operation since then.

Tiempo was also a Rockefeller fellow. In addition to his career at Silliman, Tiempo taught fiction and literary criticism for four years in two American schools during the 1960s.

== Works ==
His novel, Cry Slaughter, published in 1957 was a revised version of his Watch in the Night novel published four years earlier in the Philippines. Cry Slaughter had four printings by Avon in New York, a hardbound edition in London, and six European translations.

=== Novels ===
- Watch in the Night (1953)
- Cry Slaughter! (1957)
- To Be Free (1972, ISBN 971-10-0014-8)
- More Than Conquerors (1982, ISBN 971-10-0388-0)
- Cracked Mirror (1984, ISBN 971-10-0145-4)
- The Standard Bearer (1985, ISBN 971-10-0237-X)
- Farah (2001, ISBN 971-10-1046-1)

=== Poetry ===
- Inside Job

=== Collections ===
- Stream at Dalton Pass and Other Stories (1970)
- Finality, a novelette and five short stories (1982)
- Rainbow for Rima (1988, ISBN 971-10-0332-5)
- Snake Twin and Other Stories (1992, ISBN 971-10-0490-9)
- The Paraplegics And Five Short Stories (1995, ISBN 971-8967-19-2)
- Literary Criticism In The Philippines And Other Essays (1995, ISBN 971-555-040-1)

== Awards ==
- Cultural Center of the Philippines (CCP) Prize
- Palanca Awards
- U.P. Golden Anniversary Literary Contest
- National Book Award
