= 1984 Palanca Awards =

Philippine literary award

34th Palanca Awards

The 34th Don Carlos Palanca Memorial Awards for Literature was held to commemorate the memory of Don Carlos Palanca Sr. through an endeavor that would promote education and culture in the country. This year saw the category of Novel/Nobela, for both the English and Filipino Divisions, being open for competition only every two years.

LIST OF WINNERS

The 1984 winners were divided into twelve categories, open only to English and Filipino [Tagalog] novel, short story, poetry, essay, one-act play, and full-length play:

== English Division ==
=== Novel ===
- Special Prize: Wilfrido D. Nolledo, Vaya Con Virgo

=== Short Story ===
- First Prize: Susan S. Lara, "The Reprieve"
- Second Prize: Sylvia Mendrez Ventura, "The Tangerine Gumamela"
- Third Prize: Gregorio Brillantes, "Stranger in an Asian City"

Lemuel Torrevillas, "The Little Wars of Filemon Sayre"

=== Poetry ===
- First Prize: Ma. Luisa A. Igloria, "Configuring the Gods and Other Poems"

Edgardo B. Maranan, "Voyage: Poem"

- Second Prize: Simeon Dumdum Jr., "Gossamer"

Felix Fojas, "Port of Entry"
Fidelito Cortes, "Waiting for Lobregat"

- Third Prize: Alfredo N. Salanga, "February 1899"

Susan Pe, "Moving with the Wind"
Bing Caballero, "Songs in Three Continents"

=== Essay ===
- First Prize: Gregorio C. Brillantes, "Climate of Disaster, Season of Disgrace"
- Second Prize: Ricaredo Demetillo, "The Socio-political Implication in the Fiction of F. Sionil Jose"
- Third Prize: Jose Y. Dalisay Jr., "Tales of the Subdivided"

=== One-Act Play ===
- First Prize: Rolando S. Tinio, "Claudia and Her Mother"
- Second Prize: Alexander Lee, "Lunch"
- Third Prize: Renato L. Zamora, "A Showcase of Basic Sentiments"

=== Full-Length Play ===
- First Prize: No Winner
- Second Prize: No Winner
- Third Prize: Herminia Sison, "The Squirrels"
- Honorable Mention: Floy Quintos, "Gironiere"

== Filipino Division ==
=== Nobela ===
- Grand Prize: Lualhati Bautista, Bata, Bata, Paano Ka Ginawa

Tony Perez, Bata, Sinaksak, Isinilid sa Baul

=== Maikling Kwento ===
- First Prize: Fidel Rillo, Jr., "Sa Kadawagan ng Pilikmata"
- Second Prize: Dong Delos Reyes, "Gamugamo sa Kalawakan"
- Third Prize: Pat V. Villafuerte, "Ang Huling Itineraryo ng Pulo-pulong Utak ni Propesor Balisungsong"

=== Tula ===
- First Prize: Tomas F. Agulto, "Bakasyunista"
- Second Prize: Virgilio S. Almario, "Isang Mamamayan ng Lungsod at Iba pang Tula"
- Third Prize: Fidel Rillo, Jr., "Mga Tugma ng Paglikha, Mga Talinhaga ng Pagpuksa"

Teo T. Antonio, "Sa Bibig ng Bulkan at Iba pang Krisis"

=== Sanaysay ===
- First Prize: Lilia Quindoza Santiago, "Mga Titik sa Dambuhalang Bato"
- Second Prize: Isagani R. Cruz, "Si Lam-ang, Si Fernando Poe, Jr. at si Aquino"
- Third Prize: Edgardo B. Maranan, "Mga Tinig ng Pagtutol"

=== Dulang May Isang Yugto ===
- First Prize: No Winner
- Second Prize: Rene O. Villanueva, "Punla ng Dekada"
- Third Prize: Jose Y. Dalisay Jr., "Kalapating Dagat"

=== Dulang Ganap ang Haba ===
- First Prize: Rene O. Villanueva, "Sigwa"
- Second Prize: Bonifacio Ilagan, "Juego de Prendas"
- Third Prize: Ruth Elynia S. Mabanglo, "Mga Puntod"

== Sources ==
- "The Don Carlos Palanca Memorial Awards for Literature | Winners 1984". Archived from the original on 2009-10-22.
