= Talaang Ginto =

- Awarded for: Excellence in Filipino poetry
- Country: Philippines
- First award: 1963

The Talaang Ginto (Golden List), formerly known as the “Talaang Ginto: Gawad Surian sa Tula-Gantimpalang Tamayo” (Golden List: Institute Award-Tamayo Prize), is a sought-after annual literary award in Philippine poetry. The Talaang Ginto is perhaps the longest-running state-run literary contest that began in 1963 by the Surian ng Wikang Pambansa (Institute of National Language). The Surian was later replaced by the Komisyon sa Wikang Filipino in 1991. The Commission organizes the contest at present.

== History ==
For 25 years, since 1984, the contest was supported by the Jorge Collantes Foundation, which gave the award its other name, Gantimpalang Collantes or Collantes Prize. In 2009, the Tamayo Foundation took over, and the award was renamed, Gantimpalang Tamayo or Tamayo Prize.

The Talaang Ginto annually gives six awards for poetry in Filipino, three major prizes, and three honorable mentions. The recipient of the first prize is automatically proclaimed as the Makata ng Taon or “Poet of the Year,” and delivers a valedictory response during the awarding ceremonies.

The Talaang Ginto is held every April 2 to celebrate the birth of the Philippines’ foremost poet, Francisco Balagtas.

== Makata ng Taon Honorees ==
- 2026

Eugene Geibrielle A. Nacino

- 2025

Michael Rabara Gallego

- 2024

Adrian Pete Medina Pregonir

- 2023

Mikka Ann V. Cabangon

- 2022

Paterno Buban Baloloy Jr.

- 2021

Paolo Miguel Gamboa Tiausas

- 2020

Karl Ivan Dan V. Orit

- 2019

Michael Jude C. Tumamac

- 2018

Christian Jil R. Benitez

- 2017

Aldrin P. Pentero

- 2016

Mark Anthony S. Angeles

- 2015

Christian Ray P. Pilares

- 2014

Ezzard R. Gilbang

- 2013

Joselito Delos Reyes

- 2012

Alvin C. Ursua

- 2011

Louie Jon Agustin Sanchez

- 2010

David Michael M. San Juan

- 2009

Louie Jon Agustin Sanchez

- 2008

Reuel Molina Aguila

- 2007

Genaro R. Gojo Cruz

- 2006

Louie Jon Agustin Sanchez

- 2005

Jerry B. Gracio

- 2004

Genaro R. Gojo Cruz

- 2003

Nestor A. Barco

- 2002

Carlos Guevarra Payongayong

- 2001

Maribel G. Bagabaldo

- 2000

Eugene Y. Evasco

- 1999

Tomas F. Agulto

- 1998

Reynaldo A. Duque

- 1997

Tomas F. Agulto

- 1996

Ariel Dim. Borlongan

- 1995

Ariel Dim. Borlongan

- 1994

Niles Jordan D. Breis

- 1993

Cirilo F. Bautista

- 1992

Ruth Elynia S. Mabanglo

- 1991

Rowena F. Festin

- 1990

Ariel N. Valerio

- 1989

Lilia Quindoza Santiago

- 1988

Tomas F. Agulto

- 1987

Fidel D. Rillo. Jr.

- 1986

Mike L. Bigornia

- 1985

Victor Emmanuel Carmelo D. Nadera

- 1984

Virgilio S. Almario

- 1983

Flor Condino Gonzales

- 1982

Pedro L. Ricarte

- 1981

Edmundo Libid

- 1980

Lamberto E. Antonio

- 1979

Jesus Manuel Santiago

- 1978

Jesus Manuel Santiago

- 1977

Galeny G. Topacio-Manalaysay

- 1976

Teo T. Antonio

- 1975

Romulo A. Sandoval

- 1974

Isaias Villaflores

- 1973

Aurelio G. Angeles

- 1972

(no winner proclaimed)

- 1971

Ramon H. Belen

- 1970

(no contest held)

- 1969

Rogelio G. Mangahas

- 1968

Victor S. Fernandez

- 1967

Celestino M. Vega

- 1966

Federico Licsi Espino

- 1965

Vict. V. dela Cruz

- 1964

Teo S. Baylen

- 1963

Bienvenido A. Ramos
