= 1983 Palanca Awards =

Philippine literary award

33rd Palanca Awards

The 33rd Don Carlos Palanca Memorial Awards for Literature was held to commemorate the memory of Don Carlos Palanca Sr. through an endeavor that would promote education and culture in the country.

LIST OF WINNERS

The 1983 winners were divided into twelve categories, open only to English and Filipino [Tagalog] novel, short story, poetry, essay, one-act play, and full-length play:

== English Division ==
=== Novel ===
- Special Prize: Edilberto K. Tiempo, The Standard Bearer

=== Short Story ===
- First Prize: Jose Y. Dalisay Jr., "Oldtimer"
- Second Prize: Jesus Cruz, "Games"
- Third Prize: Jose L. Ayala, "Perfect Sunday"

=== Poetry ===
- First Prize: Rowena Tiempo Torrevillas, "Seeress and Voyager"

Gemino H. Abad, "The Other Clearing"

- Second Prize: Francis Macansantos, "The Words and Other Poems"

Alfredo N. Salanga, "Thin Poems Occasioned by Big and Small Events"

- Third Prize: Simeon Dumdum Jr., "Axioms"

Cesaro Syjuco, "The Chameleon"
Ophelia Dimalanta, "The Time Factor"

=== Essay ===
- First Prize: Gregorio C. Brillantes, "Rizal, Balaguer and Teilhard: Convergence at the Luneta"
- Second Prize: Adrian Cristobal, "Letters to the President"
- Third Prize: Marjorie Evasco, "Tertulias at San Jose and a Family Album"

=== One-Act Play ===
- First Prize: No Winner
- Second Prize: Herminia Sison, "Waiting for Noriyushi"
- Third Prize: Felix A. Clemente, "The Chieftain's Daughter"
- Honorable Mention: Jessie B. Garcia, "Brief Passage"

Dong Delos Reyes, "Standard Overhauling Procedure"

=== Full-Length Play ===
- First Prize: Ed delos Santos Cabagnot, "The Theatre of Director Julius Opus"
- Second Prize: Ma. Soledad N. Fortich, "Reyna Elena"
- Third Prize: Mig Alvarez Enriquez, "Labaw, Donggon"

== Filipino Division ==
=== Nobela ===
- Grand Prize: Lualhati Bautista, Dekada '70

Edel Garcellano, Ficcion

=== Maikling Kwento ===
- First Prize: Agapito M. Lugay, "Pinagdugtong-dugtong na Hininga Mula sa Iskinitang..."
- Second Prize: Fidel Rillo Jr., "Mga Sugat sa Dibdib ni Sister Faina"
- Third Prize: Lualhati Bautista, "Buwan, Buwan, Hulugan Mo Ako ng Sundang"

Fanny A. Garcia, "Tayong Mga Maria Magdalena"

=== Tula ===
- First Prize: Jose F. Lacaba, "Sa Panahon ng Ligalig"
- Second Prize: David T. Mamaril, "Basal ang Bungo Ko"
- Third Prize: Teo T. Antonio, "Pamamangka at iba pang Pagsasagwan"

=== Sanaysay ===
- First Prize: Rosario Torres-Yu, "Ang Kontemporaryong Nobelang Tagalog"
- Second Prize: Pedro L. Ricarte, "Ukol sa Isang Komprehensibong Panunuring Pampanitikan"
- Third Prize: Lilia Quindoza Santiago, "Mula Kay Maria Clara Hanggang Kay Connie Escobar"

=== Dulang May Isang Yugto ===
- First Prize: Rene O. Villanueva, "Huling Gabi sa Maragondon"
- Second Prize: Roberto Jose De Guzman, "Liwanag sa Karimlan"
- Third Prize: Dong Delos Reyes, "Bulkang Sumambulat ang ... Pigsa"

Pedro L. Ricarte, "Madawag na Lupa"

=== Dulang Ganap ang Haba ===
- First Prize: Ruth Elynia S. Mabanglo, "Mga Abong Pangarap"
- Second Prize: Bienvenido Noriega Jr., "Batang PRO"
- Third Prize: Tony Perez, "Isang Pangyayari sa Planas Site"

== Sources ==
- "The Don Carlos Palanca Memorial Awards for Literature | Winners 1983". Archived from the original on 2009-10-22.
