= 1979 Palanca Awards =

Philippine literary award

29th Palanca Awards

The 29th Don Carlos Palanca Memorial Awards for Literature was held to commemorate the memory of Don Carlos Palanca Sr. through an endeavor that would promote education and culture in the country. This year saw the inclusion of a new category, Essay/Sanaysay, for both the English and Filipino Divisions.

LIST OF WINNERS

The 1979 winners were divided into ten categories, open only to English and Filipino [Tagalog] short story, poetry, essay, one-act play, and full-length play:

== English Division ==
=== Short Story ===
- First Prize: F. Sionil José, “Arbol de Fuego”

Rowena Tiempo Torrevillas, “Behind the Fern”

- Second Prize: César Ruiz Aquino, “Act”

Norma Miraflor, “The Other Woman”

- Third Prize: Grace Marie Katigbak, “Another Execution”

Antonio M. Nieva, “Ride a White Horse to Heaven”

=== Poetry ===
- First Prize: Cirilo F. Bautista, “Crossworks”
- Second Prize: Ricardo M. De Ungria, “Nova Blum”
- Third Prize: Edgardo B. Maranan, “Black Holes: A Closer View”

=== Essay ===
- First Prize: Enrique Jose Crisostomo, “This City is in the Heart”
- Second Prize: F. Sionil José, “A Scenario for Filipino Renaissance”
- Third Prize: Reynaldo Silvestre, “The Military As a Revolutionary Force”

=== One-Act Play ===
- First Prize: Dong Delos Reyes, “Earthworms”
- Second Prize: Bobby Flores Villasis, “Demigod”
- Third Prize: Isagani R. Cruz, “Wedding Night”

=== Full-Length Play ===
- First Prize: No Winner
- Second Prize: No Winner
- Third Prize: No Winner
- Special Mention: Felix A. Clemente, “The Fort Santiago Contract, December 1896”

== Filipino Division ==
=== Maikling Kwento ===
- First Prize: Melecio Antonio Adviento, “Lagaslas ng Hanging Makamandag”

Alfonso Mendoza, “Tipaklong, Tipaklong, Bakit Bulkang Sumabog ang Dibdib ni Delfin Balajadia”

- Second Prize: Leuterio Nicolas, “Pangarap”

Benigno R. Juan, “Habag”

- Third Prize: Jose M. Marquez, “Hindi na Babagtas ang mga Tagak”

Jun Cruz Reyes, “Mga Kuwentong Kapos”

=== Tula ===
- First Prize: Alberto F. De Guzman, “Kahit ka Man Hostess at Iba Pang Tula”
- Second Prize: Mar Al. Tiburcio, “Ngayon, Ang Daigdig at Iba pang Tula”
- Third Prize: Ruth Elynia S. Mabanglo, “Dalawampu't Isang Tula”

=== Sanaysay ===
- First Prize: Virgilio S. Almario, “Mga Talinhaga sa Panahon ng Krisis”
- Second Prize: Alice Guillermo, “Ang Kaisipang Pilipino Batay sa Sining Biswal”
- Third Prize: Anselmo Roque, “Sa Ibabaw ng Kapirasong Lupa”

=== Dulang May Isang Yugto ===
- First Prize: Mateo Trijo Doctor, “Bahay Kalapati”
- Second Prize: Manuel Galvez, “Isneg”
- Third Prize: Nonilon Queano, “Ang Bangkay”

=== Dulang Ganap ang Haba ===
- First Prize: Bonifacio Ilagan, “Langit Ma'y Magdilim”
- Second Prize: Malou Leviste Jacob, “Juan Tamban”
- Third Prize: Nonilon Queano, “Ang Katutubo”

== Sources ==
- "The Don Carlos Palanca Memorial Awards for Literature | Winners 1979". Archived from the original on 2009-10-22.
