= 1999 Palanca Awards =

Philippine literary award

49th Palanca Memorial Awards

The 49th Carlos Palanca Memorial Awards for Literature was held to commemorate the memory of Carlos T. Palanca Sr. through an endeavor that would promote education and culture in the country. This year saw the inclusion of a new Kabataan Division with two categories, open for Essays/Sanaysay in English and Filipino.

Elsa Martinez Coscolluela was this year's Palanca Hall of Fame awardee. Coscolluela clinched her fifth first prize for “Original Grace” under the Full-Length Play category. The said award is given to writers who have won five (5) first places in any category.

LIST OF WINNERS

The 1999 winners were divided into 21 categories, with the novel, short story, short story for children, poetry, essay, one-act play, and full-length play open to both English and Filipino Divisions, and the Dulang Pantelebisyon and Dulang Pampelikula open only for the Filipino Division, the short stories in Cebuano, Hiligaynon, and Iluko in the Regional Language Division, and the essays in ENglish and Filipino in the Kabataan Division.

== English Division ==
=== Novel ===
- Grand Prize: Felisa H. Batacan, Smaller and Smaller Circles

=== Short Story ===
- First Prize: Angelo Rodriguez Lacuesta, "Life Before X"
- Second Prize: Ma. Romina M. Gonzales, "Flood"
- Third Prize: Maria L.M. Fres-Felix, "Rhinoplasty"

=== Short Story for Children ===
- First Prize: Grace D. Chong, "The Boy Who Had Five Lolas"
- Second Prize: Michelle G. Rivera and Augie Rivera, "Magnificent Benito and His Two Front Teeth"
- Third Prize: Michelle Antoinette S. Tom, "Danny Goes Home"

=== Poetry ===
- First Prize: John Labella, "The Taste of One Wave"
- Second Prize: Ulysses B. Aparece, "Native Tongue"
- Third Prize: Nerisa Del Carmen Guevarra, "Reaching Destination"

=== Essay ===
- First Prize: Melba Padilla Maggay, "Once Upon a Bright Happy Boy"
- Second Prize: Alfred A. Yuson, "Remembering Villa"
- Third Prize: Lourd Ernest de Veyra, "The Rite of Strings"

=== One-Act Play ===
- First Prize: Leoncio P. Deriada, "Medea of Syquijor"
- Second Prize: Crispin Ramos, "Blind Names"
- Third Prize: John Joseph S. Coronel, "Sayonara Lola Bashang"

=== Full-Length Play ===
- First Prize: Elsa M. Coscolluela, "Original Grace"
- Second Prize: Jhoanna Lynn B. Cruz, "Halakata, MS.D"
- Third Prize: Ametta Suarez Taguchi, "Legend of the Cross"

== Filipino Division ==
=== Nobela ===
- Grand Prize: Lilia Quindoza Santiago, Ang Kaulayaw ng Agila

=== Maikling Kwento ===
- First Prize: German V. Gervacio, "Sinsil Boys"
- Second Prize: Marco A.V. Lopez, "BI"
- Third Prize: Alwin C. Aguirre, "Dalantao"

=== Maikling Kwentong Pambata ===
- First Prize: Rene O. Villanueva, "Tatlong Ungas"
- Second Prize: Nora Imelda C. Bautista, "Ang Ballet Dancer at ang Basketball Player"
- Third Prize: Augie Rivera, "Xilef"

=== Tula ===
- First Prize: Lamberto E. Antonio, "Lilok ng Lilo"
- Second Prize: Joseph T. Salazar, "May Laman at Mababalatan"
- Third Prize: Ariel Dim. Borlongan, "Kuwentong-Baryo, Kuwentong Kanto"

=== Sanaysay ===
- First Prize: Lamberto E. Antonio, "Bakasin Mo Sa Bakasyon"
- Second Prize: Ariel Dim. Dorlongan, "Abante Sa Aking Buhay"
- Third Prize: Niles Jordan Breis, "Tatlong Lumang Sutana"

=== Dulang May Isang Yugto ===
- First Prize: Rene O. Villanueva, "Watawat"
- Second Prize: Edward P. Perez, "Unang Dalaw"
- Third Prize: Dominic D. Manrique, "Wan Chai Yuki"

=== Dulang Ganap ang Haba ===
- First Prize: Rodolfo C. Vera, "Luna, Isang Romansang Aswang"
- Second Prize: Liza C. Magtoto, "Despedida De Soltera"
- Third Prize: Edward P. Perez, "Bagting"

=== Dulang Pantelebisyon ===
- First Prize: Nicolas B. Pichay, "Babaeng Tilapia, Natagpuan sa Coastal Road"
- Second Prize: Eli Rueda Guieb III, "Banta"
- Third Prize: Isagani A. Amoncio, "Ayala Avenue"

=== Dulang Pampelikula ===
- First Prize: Ramon Felipe Sarmiento, "Si Maria at si Magdalena"
- Second Prize: Diosdado Sa. Anzures Jr., "Karumal-Dumal"
- Third Prize: Ronaldo C. Tumbokon, "Syota ng Masa"

== Regional Division ==
=== Short Story [Cebuano] ===
- First Prize: Ricardo I. Patalinhug, "Ting-Ani"
- Second Prize: Leonilo E. Estimo, "Sambunot"
- Third Prize: Oscar C. Pineda, "Ang Hari sa Tulay"

=== Short Story [Hiligaynon] ===
- First Prize: Alice Tan Gonzales, "Ang Likum sang Isla San Miguel"
- Second Prize: Leoncio P. Deriada, "Kamatayon sang Isa ka Kalye"
- Third Prize: Jonathan P. Jurilla, "Ulan sa Bulan sang Abril"

=== Short Story [Iluko] ===
- First Prize: Ricarte A. Agnes, "Dayyeng Dagiti Karayan"
- Second Prize: Reynaldo A. Duque, "Dagiti Inna nga Umulog iti Sardam"
- Third Prize: Roy V. Aragon, "Murkat"

== Kabataan Division ==
=== Kabataan Essay ===
- First Prize: Juan Ruffo D. Chong, "Learn from the Oldies and Teach the Kiddies"
- Second Prize: Catherine Candano, "Got Pinoy"
- Third Prize: Melissa Mae B. Santos, "Cultivating Our Roots"

=== Kabataan Sanaysay ===
- First Prize: Shirley Anne S. Caparas, "Sugat At Lipad"
- Second Prize: Ranjith M. Mendoza, "Ang Papel Ng Kabataan Sa Pangangalaga ng Kahalagahang Pangkultura Ng Filipino"
- Third Prize: Melecio P. Vizcarra Jr., "Ang Papel ng Kabataan sa Pangangalaga ng Kahalagahang Pangkultura ng Filipino"

== Sources ==
- "The Don Carlos Palanca Memorial Awards for Literature | Winners 1999". Archived from the original on 2009-10-22.
