= 1995 Palanca Awards =

Philippine literary award

45th Palanca Memorial Awards

The 45th Carlos Palanca Memorial Awards for Literature was held to commemorate the memory of Carlos T. Palanca Sr. through an endeavor that would promote education and culture in the country.

The Palanca Hall of Fame was also established in 1995 and is presented to a Palanca awardee who has achieved the distinction of winning five first prizes in the regular categories. It awarded the distinction to seven writers who have already reached the milestone, including Ruth Elynia S. Mabanglo, Buenaventura S. Medina Jr., Rolando S. Tinio, Rene O. Villanueva, Gregorio C. Brillantes, Cirilo F. Bautista, and Jesus T. Peralta. Peralta clinched his fifth first prize way back in 1978 for “Exit No Exit” under the Full-Length Play category. Bautista clinched his fifth first prize way back in 1979 for “Crossroads” under the Poetry category. Brillantes clinched his fifth first prize way back in 1984 for “Climate of Disaster, Season of Disgrace” under the Essay category. Villanueva clinched his fifth first prize way back in 1990 for both “Ang Unang Baboy sa Langit” and "Tungkung Langit at Alunsina," which both won under the Maikling Kwentong Pambata category. Tinio clinched his fifth first prize way back in 1993 for “Ang Kuwento ni A.” under the Dulang Pantelebisyon category. Medina clinched his fifth first prize way back in 1993 for “Moog” under the Nobela category. And Mabanglo clinched her fifth first prize in 1995 for “Bayan ng Lunggati, Bayan ng Pighati” under the Tula category. The said award is given to writers who have won five (5) first places in any category.

LIST OF WINNERS

The 1995 winners were divided into fourteen categories, open only to English and Filipino [Tagalog] short story, short story for children, poetry, essay, one-act play, and full-length play, plus the Dulang Pantelebisyon and Dulang Pampelikula, open only for the Filipino Division:

== English Division ==
=== Short Story ===
- First Prize: Clinton Palanca, "The Apartment"
- Second Prize: Noelle De Jesus, "Blood"
- Third Prize: Lakambini A. Sitoy, "I See My Shadow on the Pavement"

=== Short Story for Children ===
- First Prize: Norma Olizon-Chikiamco, "Pan de Sal Saves the Day"
- Second Prize: Mary Ann Tobias, "Little Star"
- Third Prize: Erlinda Acacio Flores, "The Quarreling Kites"

=== Poetry ===
- First Prize: Elsa M. Coscolluela, "Katipunera and Other Poems"
- Second Prize: Ma. Luisa A. Igloria, "In the Ritual of Calling and Other Poems"
- Third Prize: Merlie Alunan, "Amina Among the Angels and Other Poems"

=== Essay ===
- First Prize: Susan T. Layug, "For a Pair of Red Tsinelas/Child of the River Dreams"
- Second Prize: Edmund Coronel, "No More Sweet Wild Garden"
- Third Prize: Clinton Palanca, "In Paris"

=== One-Act Play ===
- First Prize: No Winner
- Second Prize: No Winner
- Third Prize: No Winner
- Honorable Mention: Merlinda Bobis, "Ms. Serena Serenata"

=== Full-Length Play ===
- First Prize: Anton Juan Jr., "Sakurahime or the Princess of the Cherry Blossoms"
- Second Prize: No Winner
- Third Prize: No Winner

== Filipino Division ==
=== Maikling Kwento ===
- First Prize: Levy Balgos De la Cruz,"Fetad"
- Second Prize: Rebecca T. Añonuevo, "Iba-iba, Pare-pareho"
- Third Prize: Rolando Bernales, "Taguan"

=== Maikling Kwentong Pambata ===
- First Prize: Ma. Corazon Paulina Remegio, "Papel de Liha"
- Second Prize: Rene O. Villanueva, "Blip"
- Third Prize: Ronaldo L. Carcamo, "Ang Mga Tsismis sa Baryo Silid"

Natasha Vizcarra, "Isang Kuwentong Ulap"
Fanny A. Garcia, "Sapagkat ang Special Children ay Bahagi rin ng Lipunan at Mundo"

- Honorable Mention: Merlinda Bobis, "Ms. Serena Serenata"

Jose Victor Z. Torres, "The Flathouse Roof"

=== Tula ===
- First Prize: Ruth Elynia S. Mabanglo, "Bayan ng Lunggati, Bayan ng Pighati"
- Second Prize: Vivian Limpin, :Tinatawag Nila Akong Makata"
- Third Prize: Lilia Quindoza Santiago, "Mga Larawang Pisikal at Iba pang Tula"

=== Sanaysay ===
- First Prize: Eli Rueda Guieb III, "Lakambini: Mula Duyong Hanggang Gunita"
- Second Prize: Buenaventura S. Medina Jr., "Ganito Kami Noon, Ganito Pa Rin Kami Ngayon"
- Third Prize: Edmund Coronel, Humabi ng mga Salita, Saksihan ang Hiwaga"

=== Dulang May Isang Yugto ===
- First prize: Amelia L. Bonifacio, "Dalawang Bayani"
- Second prize: Sunnie Noel, "Sulambi"
- Third prize: Jose Victor Z. Torres, "Sandaling Tagpo"

=== Dulang Ganap ang Haba ===
- First Prize: Lito Casaje, "Matrimonyal"
- Second Prize: 1896 by Carlos Dela Paz Jr.
- Third Prize: Rene O. Villanueva, "Bintao"

Rodolfo R. Lana Jr., "Exodo"

=== Dulang Pantelebisyon ===
- First Prize: Mes De Guzman, "Plebo"
- Second Prize: Eli Rueda Guieb III, "Siyasat"
- Third Prize: Mes De Guzman, "Ang Lalaki sa Bubong"

=== Dulang Pampelikula ===
- First Prize: Rodolfo R. Lana Jr., "Karinyo-brutal"
- Second Prize: Rolando S. Tinio, "Kalapati"
- Third Prize: Lore Reyes, "Kapag Umawit ang Sirena"

Rosauro Dela Cruz, "Ninoy"

== Sources ==
- "The Don Carlos Palanca Memorial Awards for Literature | Winners 1995". Archived from the original on 2009-10-22.
