= 1982 Palanca Awards =

Philippine literary award

32nd Palanca Awards

The 32nd Don Carlos Palanca Memorial Awards for Literature was held to commemorate the memory of Don Carlos Palanca Sr. through an endeavor that would promote education and culture in the country.

LIST OF WINNERS

The 1982 winners were divided into twelve categories, open only to English and Filipino [Tagalog] novel, short story, poetry, essay, one-act play, and full-length play:

== English Division ==
=== Novel ===
- Grand Prize: Antonio R. Enriquez, Surveyors of the Liguasan Marsh

=== Short Story ===
- First Prize: Jose Y. Dalisay Jr., "Heartland"
- Second Prize: Azucena Grajo Uranza, "Pas De Deux"
- Third Prize: Jose Marte Abueg, "The Sky is Always Blue"

=== Poetry ===
- First Prize: Pablo Liwanag, "Monologues or Otherwise I & II"

Cesar Felipe Bacani Jr., "Outsider and Other Poems"

- Second Prize: Simeon Dumdum Jr., "Masbate"

Alfred A. Yuson, "Tightwire and Other Poems"

- Third Prize: Augusta Almedda, "Dolphin, Dinosaurs and Eagles"

Edgardo B. Maranan, "Pax Panda and Other Poems"

=== Essay ===
- First Prize: Jesus S.M. Dimapilis, "Archipelagos of Time: Islands of the Universe"
- Second Prize: Jorshinelle Sonza, "A Gift From the Island"
- Third Prize: Sheila Coronel, "Bound to the Earth"

=== One-Act Play ===
- First Prize: No Winner
- Second Prize: No Winner
- Third Prize: Tony Perez, "The Wayside Café"
- Honorable Mention: Elsa M. Coscolluela, "Late Journey Home"

=== Full-Length Play ===
- First Prize: No Winner
- Second Prize: No Winner
- Third Prize: No Winner
- Honorable Mention: Leopoldo C. Gonzales, "Return to Villa Fuente"

Elsa M. Coscolluela, "The Gemini Conspiracy"

== Filipino Division ==
=== Nobela ===
- Grand Prize: Victor V. Francisco, Kulang ng Isa sa Sandosena: Ba't di pa Magkasya sa Labing-isa na Lang

Jun Cruz Reyes, Tutubi! Tutubi! 'Wag Kang Magpapahuli sa Mamang Salbahe

=== Maikling Kwento ===
- First Prize: Lualhati Bautista, "Tatlong Kuwento ng Buhay ni Julian Candelabra"
- Second Prize: Fanny A. Garcia, "Arrivederci"
- Third Prize: No Winner
- Honorable Mention: Ma. Cristina Mata-Basco, "Biyernes Santo: Mainit na Araw, Malamig na Sago"

Cresenciano Marquez Jr., "Paglaya"

=== Tula ===
- First Prize: Cresenciano Marquez Jr., "Odyssey ng Siglo"
- Second Prize: Mar Al. Tiburcio, "Tula ng Aking Panahon"
- Third Prize: Edgardo B. Maranan, Balada sa Baklad, sa Darating na Liwanag"

=== Sanaysay ===
- First Prize: Fanny A. Garcia, "Isang Liham sa Baul ng Isang Manunulat"
- Second Prize: Fanny A. Garcia, "Italia! Italia!"
- Third Prize: Anselmo Roque, "Proyekto sa Ilog Chico: Isang Dambuhalang Talinhaga sa Panahon Natin"

=== Dulang May Isang Yugto ===
- First Prize: Anton Juan Jr., "Taong-Grasa"
- Second Prize: Rene O. Villanueva, "Nana"
- Third Prize: Leoncio P. Deriada, "Si Mr. Daga, Si Mrs. Daga at ang Doktor"

=== Dulang Ganap ang Haba ===
- First Prize: No Winner
- Second Prize: Malou Leviste Jacob, "Ang Mahabang Pagdadalawang-isip sa Maikling Buhay ng Isang Petiburgis"
- Third Prize: Jose Javier Reyes, "Lamat"

== Sources ==
- "The Don Carlos Palanca Memorial Awards for Literature | Winners 1982". Archived from the original on 2009-10-22.
