= 1980 Palanca Awards =

Literary award for Philippine writers

30th Palanca Awards

The 30th Don Carlos Palanca Memorial Awards for Literature was held to commemorate the memory of Don Carlos Palanca Sr. through an endeavor that would promote education and culture in the country. This year saw the inclusion of a new category, Novel/Nobela, for both the English and Filipino Divisions.

LIST OF WINNERS

The 1980 winners were divided into twelve categories, open only to English and Filipino [Tagalog] novel, short story, poetry, essay, one-act play, and full-length play:

== English Division ==
=== Novel ===
- Special Prize: Remmie Suaco Brillo, Silapulapu and The Zebut Brothers

=== Short Story ===
- First Prize: Rowena Tiempo Torrevillas, "The Fruit of the Vine"
- Second Prize: Rosario Garcellano, "Flashback"
- Third Prize: Cristina Pantoja-Hidalgo, "The Outsider"

=== Poetry ===
- First Prize: Alfredo N. Salanga, "Voices Prompted by the News, A Staple Food"
- Second Prize: Gemino H. Abad, "Counterclockwise"

Ricardo M. De Ungria, "R+A+D+I+O"

- Third Prize: Rowena Tiempo Torrevillas, "The Running Shadow and the Street Tree"

Alfred A. Yuson, "Travelogue"

=== Essay ===
- First Prize: Marra Pl. Lanot, "Deja Vu In America or One of the Songs"
- Second Prize: Patricia Melendrez-Cruz, "Liberal Individualism and the Commonwealth Novels"
- Third Prize: Ligaya Tiamson-Rubin, "Turning Back and Moving Back"

=== One-Act Play ===
- First Prize: Eric Gamalinda, "Anatomy of a Passionate Derangement"
- Second Prize: Elsa M. Coscolluela, "Captive Word"
- Third Prize: Alfredo N. Salanga, "The Surrender"

=== Full-Length Play ===
- First Prize: No Winner
- Second Prize: Elsa M. Coscolluela, "In My Father's House"
- Third Prize: Herminia Sison, "Fiesta"
- Honorable Mention: Lemuel Torrevillas, "Looking for Edison, or What's the Name of the Guy Who Invented Something"

== Filipino Division ==
=== Nobela ===
- Grand Prize: Lualhati Bautista, 'Gapo

=== Maikling Kwento ===
- First Prize: Reynaldo A. Duque, "Kandong"
- Second Prize: Alfonso Mendoza, "Ang Tornilyo sa Utak ni Rufo Sabater"
- Third Prize: Benigno R. Juan, "Orasyon sa Simbahan, sa Piitan at sa Coral Ballroom ng Manila Hilton"

=== Tula ===
- First Prize: Teresita Capili-Sayo, "Pula ang Putik sa Konkretong Looban at iba pang Tula"
- Second Prize: Orlando Olgado, "Sa Kopitang Litro, Ang Alak ay Krudo at iba pang tula"
- Third Prize: Mar Al. Tiburcio, "Mga Talababa ng Panahon"

=== Sanaysay ===
- First Prize: Pedro L. Ricarte, "Ang Krus sa Balikat ng Makata"
- Second Prize: Jun Cruz Reyes, "Ilang Talang Luma Buhat sa Talaarawan ng Isang May Nunal sa Talampakan"
- Third Prize: Benigno R. Juan, "Pagkamulat at Iba Pang Sanaysay"

=== Dulang May Isang Yugto ===
- First Prize: Wilfred S. Victoria, "Isang Gabi sa Beerhouse"

Rene O. Villanueva, "Kumbersasyon"

- Second Prize: Isagani R. Cruz, "Kuwadro"

Angelito Tiongson, "Pari-pari"

- Third Prize: Dong Delos Reyes, "At Iba Pang Lakay..."

Ruth Elynia S. Mabanglo, "Awiyao"

=== Dulang Ganap ang Haba ===
- First Prize: Dong Delos Reyes, "Daungan ... Laot ... Daungan"
- Second Prize: Jose Y. Dalisay Jr., "Ambon sa Madaling Araw"
- Third Prize: Conrado De Quiros, "1898: Sa Mata ng Daluyong"

== Sources ==
- "The Don Carlos Palanca Memorial Awards for Literature | Winners 1980". Archived from the original on 2009-10-22.
