= 1971 Palanca Awards =

Philippine literary award

21st Palanca Awards

The 21st Don Carlos Palanca Memorial Awards for Literature was held to commemorate the memory of Don Carlos Palanca Sr. through an endeavor that would promote education and culture in the country.

LIST OF WINNERS

The 1971 winners were divided into six categories, open only to English and Filipino [Tagalog] short story, poetry, and one-act play:

== English Division ==
=== Short Story ===
- First Prize: Cirilo F. Bautista, "The Ritual"
- Second Prize: Resil Mojares, "Beast in the Fields"
- Third Prize: Amadis Ma. Guerrero, "Children of the City"

=== Poetry ===
- First Prize: Cirilo F. Bautista, "The Archipelago"
- Second Prize: Wilfredo Pascua Sanchez, "Five Poems"
- Third Prize: Federico Licsi Espino Jr., "From Mactan to Mendiola"

=== One-Act Play ===
- First Prize: Maidan T. Flores, "The Grotesque Among Us"
- Second Prize: Jesus T. Peralta, "Age of Prometheus"
- Third Prize: Alfredo O. Cuenca Jr., "Operation Pacification"

== Filipino Division ==
=== Maikling Kwento ===
- First Prize: Edgardo B. Maranan, "Ipis sa Guhong Templo"
- Second Prize: Jose Reyes Munsayac, "Isang Araw sa Buhay ni Juan Lazaro"
- Third Prize: Wilfredo Pa. Virtusio, "Maria, Ang Iyong Anak"

=== Tula ===
- First Prize: Rogelio Mangahas, "Mga Duguang Plakard at Iba Pang Tula"
- Second Prize: Lamberto E. Antonio, "Tatlong Awit ng Pagpuksa"
- Third Prize: Cirilo F. Bautista, "Tinikling (Dalawang Tula)"

=== Dulang May Isang Yugto ===
- First Prize: Victor V. Francisco, "Dugo sa Uhay ng Luntiang Palayan"
- Second Prize: Fernando L. Samonte, "Langit at Lupa"
- Third Prize: Alberto S. Florentino Jr., "Panahon ng Digma"

== Sources ==
- "The Don Carlos Palanca Memorial Awards for Literature | Winners 1971". Archived from the original on 2009-10-22.
