= 1985 Palanca Awards =

Philippine literary award

35th Palanca Awards

The 35th Don Carlos Palanca Memorial Awards for Literature was held to commemorate the memory of Don Carlos Palanca Sr. through an endeavor that would promote education and culture in the country.

LIST OF WINNERS

The 1985 winners were divided into ten categories, open only to English and Filipino [Tagalog] short story, poetry, essay, one-act play, and full-length play:

== English Division ==
=== Short Story ===
- First Prize: Eli Ang Barroso, “A Nobel Prize for Jorge Luis Borges”

Conrado De Quiros, “The Hand of God”

- Second Prize: No Winner
- Third Prize: Charlson Ong, “Men of the East”

=== Poetry ===
- First Prize: Alfred A. Yuson, “Dream of Knives”

Alfredo N. Salanga, “Miscellanea 1984-1985”

- Second Prize: Eric Gamalinda, “Ara Vos Prec”

Felix Fojas, “Confabulations”
Marne Kilates, “Finders of the Image”

- Third Prize: Juaniyo Arcellana, “In the South Country”

Merlie Alunan, “The Gift Supreme”
Jose Victor Peñaranda, “Voyage in Dry Season”

=== Essay ===
- First Prize: Conrado De Quiros, “Micro Sense, Macro Madness”
- Second Prize: Gregorio C. Brillantes, “In Memory of Rizal, In Remembrance of Madrid”
- Third Prize: Alfred A. Yuson, “A Filipino Poet's Tokyo”

Edel Garcellano, “Reportage on the State of Class War and Philippine Poetry”

=== One-Act Play ===
- First Prize: Jorge Hernandez, “El Sentido del Indio”
- Second Prize: Elsa M. Coscolluela, “First Fruits”
- Third Prize: Herminia Sison, “Blessed are the Poor”

=== Full-Length Play ===
- First Prize: No Winner
- Second Prize: No Winner
- Third Prize: Felix A. Clemente, “The Maragondon Conspiracy”

Floy Quintos, “Passion Play”

== Filipino Division ==
=== Maikling Kwento ===
- First Prize: Ernie Yang, “Unang Binyag”
- Second Prize: Danilo Consumido, “Mga Lamat ng Moog”
- Third Prize: Lamberto E. Antonio, “Alitaptap sa Gabing Maunos”

=== Tula ===
- First Prize: Mike L. Bigornia, “Puntablangko”
- Second Prize: Lamberto E. Antonio, “Pagsalubong sa Habagat”
- Third Prize: Alfredo N. Salanga, “Etsetera”

=== Sanaysay ===
- Special Prizes:

Anselmo Roque, “Isang Munting Aklat ng mga Gunita”
Fidel Rillo Jr., “Now for the Fun of Flowing Gutter”
Pedro L. Ricarte, “Pagbuo ng Sariling Pampanitikang Ideolohiya”
Sol Juvida, “Patria Concha Andal: Ina, Bilanggo, Biktima”
Isagani R. Cruz, “Seks/Dahas: Pelikula/Lipunan”

=== Dulang May Isang Yugto ===
- First Prize: No Winner
- Second Prize: No Winner
- Third Prize: No Winner
- Honorable Mention: Vergel A. Ramos, “Experimento”

Bonifacio Ilagan, “Pulanlupa”
Roberto Jose De Guzman, “Sa Ngalan ng Ama”

=== Dulang Ganap ang Haba ===
- First Prize: Jose C. Papa, “Sandatahan”
- Second Prize: Bienvenido Noriega Jr., “Pansamantalang Dilim”
- Third Prize: Roberto Jose De Guzman, “Martir”

Corazon Urquico, “Stateside”'
