= 1986 Palanca Awards =

Philippine literary award

36th Palanca Awards

The 36th Don Carlos Palanca Memorial Awards for Literature was held to commemorate the memory of Don Carlos Palanca Sr. through an endeavor that would promote education and culture in the country.

LIST OF WINNERS

The 1986 winners were divided into ten categories, open only to English and Filipino [Tagalog] short story, poetry, essay, one-act play, and full-length play:

== English Division ==
=== Short Story ===
- First Prize: Jose Y. Dalisay Jr., “Merlie”
- Second Prize: Jose Y. Dalisay Jr., “The Other Side”
- Third Prize: Cesar Felipe Bacani Jr., “The Judge”

=== Poetry ===
- First Prize: Marne Kilates, “Portraits, Tributes, Protestations, Protests”
- Second Prize: Eli Ang Barroso, “Poet's Dozen”
- Third Prize: Ma. Fatima V. Lim, “Between Places”

Ma. Luisa A. Igloria, “Disclosures”

=== Essay ===
- First Prize: Wilma Vitug, “Dateline Manila: A Foreign Journalist's Odyssey”
- Second Prize: Herminio Beltran Jr., “Revolt of Spectacles”
- Third Prize: Constantino C. Tejero, “The Men and Women in Bilibid”

=== One-Act Play ===
- First Prize: No Winner
- Second Prize: No Winner
- Third Prize: Leoncio P. Deriada, “Airport on Mactan Island”
- Honorable Mention: Ametta Suarez-Taguchi, “Celadon”

=== Full-Length Play ===
- First Prize: Ametta Suarez-Taguchi, “Balaring”
- Second Prize: Ed delos Santos Cabagnot, “Aria or Madame Macro's Massive Pentimiento”
- Third Prize: Mig Alvarez Enriquez, “Lapulapu of Mactan”

== Filipino Division ==
=== Maikling Kwento ===
- First Prize: Cyrus P. Borja, “Ang Damo sa Fort Bonifacio”
- Second Prize: Jun Cruz Reyes, “Syeyring”
- Third Prize: Edgardo B. Maranan, “Talahib”

=== Tula ===
- First Prize: Teo Antonio, “Panahon ng Pagpuksa at Iba pang Pakikidigma”
- Second Prize: Ariel Dim. Borlongan, “Mga Himaymay ng Paglalamay”
- Third Prize: Jun Cruz Reyes, “Syeyring at iba pang Tula”

=== Sanaysay ===
- First Prize: Rogelio Mangahas, “Si Edgardo M. Reyes: Ang Manunulat, Kanyang Akda at Panahon”
- Second Prize: Fidel Rillo Jr., “Ang Tiyanak sa Landas ni Rio Alma”
- Third Prize: Jun Cruz Reyes, “Ilang Talang Luma Buhat sa Talaarawan ng Isang May Nunal sa Talampakan”

=== Dulang May Isang Yugto ===
- First Prize: Reynaldo A. Duque, “Ang mga Tattoo ni Emmanuel Resureccion”
- Second Prize: Roberto Jose De Guzman, “Haplos ng Dahas”
- Third Prize: Reuel Molina Aguila, “Alimuom”

Rolando Dela Cruz, “Sa Huling Gabi ng Palabas”

=== Dulang Ganap ang Haba ===
- First Prize: Bienvenido Noriega Jr., “Bayan Mo”
- Second Prize: Lito Casaje, “Juan dela Cruz, New York City”
- Third Prize: Rene O. Villanueva, “Ang Hepe”

== Sources ==
- "The Don Carlos Palanca Memorial Awards for Literature | Winners 1986". Archived from the original on 2009-10-22.
