= 1992 Palanca Awards =

Philippine literary award

42nd Palanca Awards

The 42nd Don Carlos Palanca Memorial Awards for Literature was held to commemorate the memory of Don Carlos Palanca Sr. through an endeavor that would promote education and culture in the country.

LIST OF WINNERS

The 1992 winners were divided into thirteen categories, open only to English and Filipino [Tagalog] short story, short story for children, poetry, essay, one-act play, and full-length play, plus the Dulang Pantelebisyon, open only for the Filipino Division:

== English Division ==
=== Short Story ===
- First Prize: Charlson Ong, “The Trouble in Beijing”
- Second Prize: Vicente Garcia Groyon, “On Cursed Ground”
- Third Prize: Edgardo B. Maranan, “Cogon”

=== Short Story for Children ===
- First Prize: Amado Lacuesta Jr., ”Lost”
- Second Prize: Marivi Soliven, “Chun”
- Third Prize: Rene O. Villanueva, “The Zimbragatzes of the Planet Zing”

=== Poetry ===
- First prize: Merlie Alunan, “Dream of the Blue Gypsy”
- Second prize: Ma. Fatima V. Lim, “Crossing the Snow Bridge”
- Third prize: Fidelito Cortes, “Santa Claus and Venus at the Mall”

=== Essay ===
- First Prize: Edgardo B. Maranan, “Island and Hinterland”
- Second Prize: Claudio Leones, “The Press: Nobody's Perfect”
- Third Prize: Cristina Pantoja-Hidalgo, “An Old Fashioned Woman”

=== One-Act Play ===
- First Prize: No Winner
- Second Prize: No Winner
- Third Prize: Crispin Ramos Jr., “Blind Alleys”
- Honorable Mention: Rene O. Villanueva, “She Devil”

=== Full-Length Play ===
- First Prize: No Winner
- Second Prize: No Winner
- Third Prize: No Winner
- Honorable Mention: Rainerio George Ramos, “The Jagged Edge of Being”

== Filipino Division ==
=== Maikling Kwento ===
- First Prize: Henry Nadong, “Gaya ng Dati”
- Second Prize: Evelyn Estrella-Sebastian, “Si Regina at Ako”
- Third Prize: Ariel Valerio, “Ang Mga Martir”

=== Maikling Kwentong Pambata ===
- First Prize: Rene O. Villanueva, “Nemo, Ang Batang Papel”
- Second Prize: Luna Sicat-Cleto, “Alakdan”
- Third Prize: Jose A. Bragado, “Meek... Meeek...”

=== Tula ===
- First Prize: Mike L. Bigornia, “Bestiyaryo at iba pang Prosang Itim”
- Second Prize: Victor Emmanuel Nadera Jr., "Labinglima Lamang"
- Third Prize: Romulo P. Baquiran Jr., “Makiling Suite at iba pang Tula”

Ma. Jovita Zarate, “Sa Pagbabalangkas ng mga Gunita”

=== Sanaysay ===
- First Prize: Reuel Molina Aguila, “How I Spent My Summer Vacation O Kung Papaano Ko Ipaliliwanag”
- Second Prize: Eli Rueda Guieb III, “Sa Panahon ng Pagpapaliban at Pagpipinid”
- Third Prize: Cesar Aljama, “Kumpisal ng Isang Nag-aatubiling Mag-sulat”

=== Dulang May Isang Yugto ===
- First Prize: Abel Molina, “Daigdig Dinaig ng Makamundong Pananalig”

Emelita Regis, “Dalawang Mukha ng Kagubatan”

- Second Prize: Mars D. Cavestany Jr., “Isang Dulang Romantiko sa Modernong Panahon”

Lakangiting Garcia, “Juan Bautista”

- Third Prize: Rodolfo R. Lana Jr., “Churchill”

Ramon C. Jocson, “I.C.U.”

=== Dulang Ganap ang Haba ===
- First Prize: Josephine Barrios, “Damas de Noche”
- Second Prize: Rodolfo C. Vera, “Kung Paano Ko Pinatay si Diana Ross”
- Third Prize: Rolando S. Salvana, “Jerry at Richie Twin Peaks”

Rodolfo C. Vera, “Kapitan Popong: Ang Pakikipagsapalaran ng Isang Batang Bayani”

=== Dulang Pantelebisyon ===
- First Prize: Elsa M. Coscolluela, “After Long Silence”

Ronaldo C. Tumbokon, “Walang Lunas”

- Second Prize: Rene O. Villanueva, “One More Chance”
- Third Prize: Rolando S. Salvana, “A Tree to Cut Down”

Rolando F. Santos, “Edukasyong Kalye”

== Sources ==
- "The Don Carlos Palanca Memorial Awards for Literature | Winners 1992". Archived from the original on 2009-10-22.
