= Tony Pérez (disambiguation) =

Tony Pérez (born 1942) is a Cuban-American baseball player, coach and player.

Tony Pérez may also refer to:

- Tony Perez (referee) (1931-2021), American boxing referee and judge
- Tony Perez (actor) (born 1935), American actor
- Tony Perez (playwright), Filipino playwright

== See also ==
- Toni Pérez (born 1990), Spanish roller hockey player
