= Lacuesta =

Lacuesta is a surname. Notable people with the surname include:

- Angelo Rodriguez Lacuesta, Filipino writer
- Félix Lacuesta (born 1958), French footballer
- Isaki Lacuesta (born 1975), Catalan film director
