= 1978 Palanca Awards =

Philippine literary award

28th Palanca Awards

The 28th Don Carlos Palanca Memorial Awards for Literature was held to commemorate the memory of Don Carlos Palanca Sr. through an endeavor that would promote education and culture in the country.

LIST OF WINNERS

The 1978 winners were divided into eight categories, open only to English and Filipino [Tagalog] short story, poetry, one-act play, and full-length play:

== English Division ==
=== Short Story ===
- First Prize: F. Sionil Jose, “Waywaya”
- Second Prize: Rowena Tiempo Torrevillas, “Sunday Morning”
- Third Prize: Luis Teodoro Jr., “Borrowed Time”

=== Poetry ===
- First Prize: Alfred A. Yuson, “15 Poems”

Alfred A. Yuson, “Icon Corner”

- Second Prize: Luis Francia, “Point of View”

Jolica Cuadra, “The Dugging Years”

- Third Prize: Ricardo Trinidad, “Rule Acrobat from Planet F”

Jose Carreon, “The Kayumanggi Cycle”

=== One-Act Play ===
- First Prize: Bobby Flores Villasis, “Vigil”
- Second Prize: Herminia Sison, “Idiot Boy”
- Third Prize: No Winner
- Honorable Mention: Paul Stephen Lim, “Hatchet Club”

Elsa M. Coscolluela, “Sundered Selves”

=== Full-Length Play ===
- First Prize: Jesus T. Peralta, “Exit No Exit”
- Second Prize: Elsa M. Coscolluela, “Katalona”
- Third Prize: Mig Alvarez Enriquez, “A Tale of Two Houses”

== Filipino Division ==
=== Maikling Kwento ===
- First Prize: Lilia Quindoza Santiago, “|Talsik ng Liwanag sa Mata ng Isang Musmos”
- Second Prize: Rosauro Dela Cruz, “Ayoko Na”
- Third Prize: Jun Cruz Reyes, “Utos ng Hari”

=== Tula ===
- First Prize: No Winner
- Second Prize: Lamberto E. Antonio, “Duyan, Araro, Punglo”
- Third Prize: Rosauro Dela Cruz, “Mga Tulang Pambata, Mga Tulang Pambatuta”
- Special Mention: Bienvenido Ramos, “Ako'y Ulilang Tinig sa Ilang”

Rolando Bartolome, “Ang Makata”
Rolando Natividad, “Inspirasyon”
Eli Ang Barroso, “Mga Tula”
Miguel Arguelles, “Oyayi ng Isang Pulubing Ina”

=== Dulang May Isang Yugto ===
- First Prize: Manuel Pambid, “Bangkang Papel”
- Second Prize: Antonio Victor Reyes, “Langit-langitang Kumunoy”
- Third Prize: Dong Delos Reyes, “Muhon”

=== Dulang Ganap ang Haba ===
- First Prize: Edgardo B. Maranan, “Ang Panahon ni Cristy”
- Second Prize: Benjamin P. Pascual, “Konsiyerto ng Apat”
- Third Prize: Bienvenido Noriega Jr., “Ang mga Propesyonal”

== Sources ==
- "The Don Carlos Palanca Memorial Awards for Literature | Winners 1978". Archived from the original on 2009-10-22.
