= Benigno Juan =

Filipino journalist and writer

Benigno Juan (born November 20, 1938) is a Filipino journalist and a writer.

== Life ==
Benigno Juan was born in Talipapa, Sta. Quiteria, Novaliches, Quezon City. As both his parents were farmers, he learned to till soil at an early age and became a farmer. He was a working student from high school until college, taking up odd jobs from farming to working in a paper mill, until he found his true calling as a journalist/writer. He received his AB Journalism degree from Manuel L. Quezon University.

Juan served as managing editor of Liwayway magazine for 16 years, and wrote numerous short stories, serialized and illustrated novels, essays, feature articles, and others. Afterwards, he became the editor and columnist of People's Journal and People's Taliba newspaper of the Journal Group of Companies .

== Community works ==
Benigno Juan has served as an elected barangay councillor of Palatiw, Pasig for two terms. He formally organized and registered the Palatiw Senior Citizen Association, Inc. (PASCA), of which he was the first President. Juan is also a former President of the San Agustin Parish Pastoral Council and a member of the Federation of Senior Citizens of Pasig.

== Awards ==
Benigno Juan has obtained many awards for his writings, such as:

- Seven Don Carlos Palanca Awards;
- Ten Surian ng Wikang Pambansa awards for essay;
- Two Samahang Balagtas awards for fiction;
- The Binhi Award for Agricultural Writing;
- An Outstanding Pasigueño Award for literature and journalism (1994);
- 2005 Outstanding Senior Citizen of Pasig City Award;
- 2006 Gawad Pambansa Alagad ni Balagtas, which was given by the Unyon ng Manunulat ng Pilipinas

== Noted Articles ==
- Malikmata (1974)
- Wala nang Lawin sa Bukid ni Tata Felipe (1975);
- Lagablab ng Isang Yagit (1977);
- Pagkamulat at iba pang Sanaysay (1980)
- Kaya Bang Ipiit at Saka Tanuran ang Isang Gunita (1981).
- Orasyon sa Simbahan, sa Piitan at sa Coral Ballroom ng Manila Hilton (1980 Palanca Awards)
- Habag

== Works ==
Benigno Juan is famous for many of his works. Examples include Ang mga Deboto, Bagyo, Ina, Kapag di ukol, Kotse, Maluwalhating Pasko, Sa Paskong Darating, Si Tatang, Sorpresa, Sumpa, Ang mga tinik ni Sigfreda, Wala nang lawin sa bukid ni Tata Felipe, Trahedya, Tagtuyot, Saan ihahanap ng puwang ang hininga’t panagimpan, Piitan, Pangamba, Orasyon, Monumento, Malas, Maibabalik pa ba?, Lagablab ng isang yagit, Kabayu-kabayuhan, Isang ganap na paglaya, Inhustisya, Ibagsak ang ano, kailan at paano, Gusto kong umiyak, Duguang sapatos, Dilim, Ama, Masarap, Masakit Umibig (Taliba newspaper, 2006), Bahay Kuwago (Taliba, 2006), and Futuristic.
