= The Birthing of Hannibal Valdez =

Novella by Alfrredo Navarro Salanga

- Book cover for Alfrredo Navarro Salanga's The Birthing of Hannibal Valdez.
- Author: Alfrredo Navarro Salanga
- Language: English, Tagalog
- Genre: Fiction
- Publication place: Philippines

The Birthing of Hannibal Valdez is a novella written in 1984 by award-winning Filipino author, poet, journalist, and editor, Alfredo “Freddie” Navarro Salanga. It is also known as The Birthing of Hannibal Valdez: A Novella Presented in a bilingual book divided into two parts, the English original version and an accompanying Pilipino version, based on the translation by Romulo A. Sandoval, entitled Ang Pagsisilang kay Hannibal Valdez. It has a foreword written by Virgilio S. Almario.

One of its lead characters is Leon Valdez.
