= 1973 Palanca Awards =

Philippine literary award

23rd Palanca Awards

The 23rd Don Carlos Palanca Memorial Awards for Literature was held to commemorate the memory of Don Carlos Palanca Sr. through an endeavor that would promote education and culture in the country.

LIST OF WINNERS

The 1973 winners were divided into six categories, open only to English and Filipino [Tagalog] short story, poetry, and one-act play:

== English Division ==
=== Short Story ===
- First Prize: Antonio R. Enriquez, “Spots on Their Wings”
- Second Prize: Ines Taccad Cammayo, “On Friends You Pin Such Hopes”
- Third Prize: Jaime An Lim, “The Liberation of Mrs. Fidela Magsilang”

=== Poetry ===
- First Prize: Cirilo F. Bautista, “Charts”
- Second Prize: Rolando S. Tinio, “A Trick of Mirrors”
- Third Prize: Erwin Castillo, “Alapaap's Mountain”

=== One-Act Play ===
- First Prize: Ricaredo Demetillo, “The Heart of Emptiness is Black”
- Second Prize: Azucena Grajo Uranza, “Go, Rider”
- Third Prize: Federico Licsi Espino Jr., “The Ricebird Has Brown Wings”

Rolando S. Tinio, “The Boxes”

== Filipino Division ==
=== Maikling Kwento ===
- First Prize: Pedro S. Dandan, “Ang Daong ni Noe”
- Second Prize: Bienvenido Ramos, “Puwang sa Lilim ng Araw”
- Third Prize: Jun Cruz Reyes, “Isang Lumang Kuwento”

=== Tula ===
- First Prize: Eduardo Garrovillas, “Walang Pangalan ang Maraming Dakila”
- Second Prize: Bienvenido Ramos, “Pakikipagtipan sa Tadhana”
- Third Prize: Ruth Elynia S. Mabanglo, “Dalit-puri at Iba Pang Tula”

=== Dulang May Isang Yugto ===
- First Prize: Ruth Elynia S. Mabanglo, “Si Jesus at si Magdalena”
- Second Prize: Wilfredo Pa. Virtusio, “Ang Daga sa Hawla”
- Third Prize: Frank G. Rivera, “Maskara”

== Sources ==
- "The Don Carlos Palanca Memorial Awards for Literature | Winners 1973". Archived from the original on 2009-10-22.
