= 1977 Palanca Awards =

1977 literary award

27th Palanca Awards

The 27th Don Carlos Palanca Memorial Awards for Literature was held to commemorate the memory of Don Carlos Palanca Sr. through an endeavor that would promote education and culture in the country.

LIST OF WINNERS

The 1977 winners were divided into eight categories, open only to English and Filipino [Tagalog] short story, poetry, one-act play, and full-length play:

== English Division ==
=== Short Story ===
- First Prize: Gregorio C. Brillantes, "Janis Joplin, The Revolution and the Melancholy Widow of Gabriela Silang Street"
- Second Prize: Rowena Tiempo Torrevillas, "Prodigal Season"
- Third Prize: Paul Stephen Lim, "Victor and Other Issues"

=== Poetry ===
- First Prize: Domingo De Guzman, "Moses and Other Poems"

Edwardo Orozco, "Stonehenge and Other Poems"

- Second Prize: Tita Lacambra Ayala, "A Filigree of Seasons"

Edgardo B. Maranan, "Foliage and Tiger Fire and Other Poems"

- Third Prize: Edel Garcellano, "Gin Tonic"

Rita Baltazar Gaddi, "Poems"

=== One-Act Play ===
- First Prize: Hermibya Sison, "The Reunion"
- Second Prize: Paul Stephen Lim, "Points of Departure"
- Third Prize: Emeterio G. Roa III, "The Carpenter"

=== Full-Length Play ===
- First Prize: Wilfrido D. Nolledo, "The Terrorist Dialogue"
- Second Prize: No Winner
- Third Prize: No Winner
- Honorable Mention: Manuel Cacdac, "Jessy Ebon"

Elsa M. Coscolluela, "The Wounded Womb"

== Filipino Division ==
=== Maikling Kwento ===
- First Prize: Hercules Del Mundo, "Ahibay"
- Second Prize: Edgardo B. Maranan, "Isang Kuwento ng Paraisong Walang Katapusan"
- Third Prize: Benigno R. Juan, "Lagablab ng Isang Yagit"

=== Tula ===
- First Prize: Lamberto E. Antonio, "Sa Bibig ng Balon at Iba pang Tula"
- Second Prize: Jesus Manuel Santiago, "Sa Pagdalaw ng Pangungulila"
- Third Prize: Teo T. Antonio, "Maskara at Mahika"

Romulo Sandoval, "Pagkat Tayo'y Nagmamahal"

=== Dulang May Isang Yugto ===
- First Prize: No Winner
- Second Prize: Diosdado Anzures Jr., "Magkano ka Walong Oras, Isang Araw"
- Third Prize: Bienvenido Noriega Jr., "Kanluran ng Buhay"
- Honorable Mention: Rogelio Sese, "Ang Huling Hibla ng Kabaliwan ni Sisa"

Lorenzo Banag, "Ang Multo sa Hawla"
Nonilon Queano, "Ang Pagbabalik ng Musikero"

=== Dulang Ganap ang Haba ===
- First Prize: Al Santos, "Mayo A-Biente Uno Atbp. Kabanata"
- Second Prize: Noel De Leon, "Barasoain"
- Third Prize: Bienvenido Noriega Jr., "Talambuhay"

== Sources ==
- "The Don Carlos Palanca Memorial Awards for Literature | Winners 1977". Archived from the original on 2009-10-21.
