= Siyokoy (linguistics) =

Hybrid words in the Filipino language, derived from English and Spanish

Siyokoy (Filipino pronunciation: ['ʃɔkoj]; SHO-koy) is a term coined by Virgilio Almario that refers to Filipino-language hybrid words seemingly derived from both English and Spanish. The Komisyon sa Wikang Filipino under the administration of Almario has considered siyokoy words to be improper and therefore its use discouraged.

== Background ==
The term siyokoy is used to describe hybrid words "not Spanish and not also English" and are said to be often made by educated people not aware of the proper equivalent of the siyokoy word in Spanish who want to use words that sound like Spanish. It was coined by National Artist Virgilio Almario, who also chaired the Komisyon sa Wikang Filipino (KWF; Commission of Filipino Language). The term is derived from the Philippine mythological creature siyokoy, roughly equivalent to the merman, ultimately derived from the Hokkien shui gui (水鬼, "water ghost").

The phenomenon was first noticed when radio broadcaster Rod Navarro popularized the word konsernado—Hispanicized from the English word "concerned". The Spanish word for "concerned" is concernido, and therefore the KWF asserts that the word in Filipino should be konsernído.

The proliferation of siyokoy words is fast due to its usage by celebrities, broadcasters, writers and academics who have limited knowledge in Spanish. The stance against siyokoy words is instituted in the KWF Manwal sa Masinop na Pagsulat style guide, which was written by Almario as KWF chair. Almario, who has been critical of siyokoy words since 1976, is more tolerant of jejemon and bekimon, which he characterize as "cultured language" meant to be intelligible by everyone and thus are not "permanent languages".

== Alternatives ==
Instead of using siyokoy words, Almario suggests consulting an English–Spanish dictionary and deriving the Filipino word from the Spanish term. He also prefers Filipino speakers to straight up use English terminologies if they are not aware of the Spanish equivalent. The most preferable approach is to use existing Filipino words such as larawan for "image".

== Examples ==
The following are examples of siyokoy words, their equivalent in English and Spanish, as well as the proper Filipino language equivalent as suggested by Almario or the KWF.

Siyokoy word (in Filipino)	Spanish	English	Proper Filipino (as suggested by the KWF)	Native Filipino equivalent
aspeto	aspecto	aspect	aspekto	mukha / dako
dayalekto	dialecto	dialect	diyalekto / dayalek	wikain
dayalogo	diálogo	dialogue	diyalogo / dayalog	pag-uusap
endorso	endoso	endorse	endoso	magtagubilin / lumagda / maglipat
imahe	imagen	image	imahen	larawan / hulagway (Seb.)
kontemporaryo	contemporáneo	contemporary	kontemporaneo / kontemporanyo	kapanahon / napapanahon
pesante	paisano	peasant	–	magbubukid / magsasaka
prayoridad	prioridad	priority	priyoridad / prayoriti	pagkauna / karapatang mauna

== See also ==
- Spanglish
