= Louie Jon A. Sanchez =

Filipino poet, fiction writer, critic and journalist

Louie Jon Agustin Sanchez
- Born: October 29, 1980 (age 45); Manila, Philippines
- Education: University of Santo Tomas, (BA); De La Salle University, (M.F.A)
- Occupations: Poet, Journalist, Critic, Teacher
- Website: louiejonsanchez.com

Louie Jon Agustin Sanchez (born 1980 in Sta. Mesa, Manila), a poet, fiction writer, critic, and journalist, hails from Flora, Apayao, Philippines. He lives in Novaliches, Caloocan, in Metro Manila.

He has won prizes including three "Makata ng Taon (Poet of the Year)" honors from the state-run Gawad Komisyon sa Tula-Gantimpalang Collantes of the Komisyon sa Wikang Filipino. He has also won an award for his fiction from the Catholic Mass Media Awards, given out yearly by the Roman Catholic Archdiocese of Manila.

== Life ==
A son of a professional electrical engineer from Baliuag, Bulacan and a fitness trainer from Abulog, Cagayan, Sanchez was born on 29 October 1980 in Sta. Mesa, Manila. He grew up in homes in San Juan City in Manila, where his parents started their family, and much later on, in Bagong Barrio, Caloocan. He now lives in Novaliches, Caloocan.

== Education ==
Educated in Catholic schools all throughout his boyhood, he finished high school at the Notre Dame of Greater Manila in Grace Park, Caloocan, before entering the University of Santo Tomas. At Santo Tomas, he enrolled at the Faculty of Arts and Letters, intending to major in communication arts. However, his stint at The Varsitarian, the official student publication, convinced him to shift to journalism. He earned a Bachelor of Arts degree in 2002. He took an MFA in creative writing at De La Salle University, where he is also currently enrolled as a PhD literature student.

== Career ==
A few months after graduating, he worked as editorial assistant for Gospel Komiks, published by the Communication Foundation for Asia. After two years, in 2004, he was taken in as supplement writer by the Philippines Graphic. While in the magazine, he helped run the Philippines Graphic-Nick Joaquin Literary Awards, one of the most prestigious prizes for Filipino fiction writers in English. The owners of the Philippines Graphic in 2006 opened a business paper, the Business Mirror. He is one of the pioneers of the paper, and he handled the business development department. In 2007, he started teaching literature and creative writing at De La Salle University-Manila, where he finished his master of fine arts in creative writing, with high distinction.

He is a member of the Linangan sa Imahen, Retorika, at Anyo (LIRA), an organization of poets writing in the Filipino language.

He was consulting editor of Asian Journal Publications, and associate editor of Balikbayan Magazine. He still reports for the Philippines Graphic.

== Published works ==
=== Books ===
At Sa Tahanan ng Alabok: Mga Tula, UST Publishing House, 2010

=== In anthologies ===
==== Poetry ====
- "La Traidora" & "Kuwento ng Monghe" in Latay sa Isipan: Mga Bagong Tulang Filipino, Cirilo F. Bautista & Allan Popa, eds.. University of Santo Tomas Publishing House, 2007
- "Katapusan" & "Retrato sa Opisina" in Ladlad 3: An Anthology of Philippine Gay Writing, J. Neil Garcia & Danton Remoto, eds., Anvil Publishing, 2007

==== Fiction ====
- "Pagninilay sa Pagpatay" in Mga Kuwentong Paspasan, Vicente Garcia Groyon, patnugot., Milflores Publishing, 2007
- "Ilang Halaw Mula sa Kathang Sa Mga Aninong Ligaw", in Aklat Likhaan ng Tula at Maikling Kuwento 2000, Roland B. Tolentino & Joi Barrios, eds., University of The Philippines Press, 2002.

=== Poetry ===
- "Digmaan" in The Varsitarian, July 31, 2009
- "Pagninilay sa Larawan ng Isang Monghe" in Komisyon sa Wikang Filipino Talaang Ginto Winners
- "Senakulo", "Perdon", "Anino" in Ideya Vol. 9, No. 2

=== Criticism ===
- "Ang Paghuhubad ng Tsinelas (O Kung Bakit Hindi Ako Makumbinse ng Havaianas)" in Alinaya: Opisyal na Newsletter ng Departamento ng Filipino, Pamantasang De La Salle-Maynila, Oktubre 10, 2008, Tomo 1 Bilang 3
- "Ang Wili sa Wowowee at ang Diasporang Filipino" in Malay Vol. 20, No. 2
- "Letting the Light In" in Ideya Vol. 9, No. 1
- "Aklat ni Job: Muni at Talang Pangkultura" in 2401: De La Salle University Newsletter, July 23, 2007

== Awards, grants, fellowships ==
- 2011 Talaang Ginto-Gantimpalang Tamayo sa Tula, Makata ng Taon and First Prize for "Talambahay"
- 2010 Lumina Pandit Poetry Contest, First Prize, Poetry in Filipino
- 2009 Linangan sa Imahen, Retorika, at Anyo, Fellow for Poetry in Filipino
- 2009 Talaang Ginto-Gantimpalang Tamayo sa Tula, Makata ng Taon and First Prize for "Ang Galit na Kristo"
- 2007 "Sangandiwa Workshop for Critical Writing", Junior Fellow, De La Salle University-Manila
- 2007 College Research Fund Grant, College of Liberal Arts, De La Salle University-Manila, for the book of poems, At Sa Tahanan ng Alabok
- 2006 Talaang Ginto-Gantimpalang Collantes sa Tula, Makata ng Taon and First Prize for "Pagninilay sa Larawan ng Isang Monghe"
- 2005 Talaang Ginto-Gantimpalang Collantes sa Tula, Honorable Mention for "Usbong ng Talim: Siklo ng Mga Tula"
- 2004 "Catholic Mass Media Awards" Best Short Story for "Ang Maglakad sa Tubig" (Serialized in Gospel Komiks Magazine for Young People)
- 2004 11th Iligan National Writers Workshop, Mindanao State University-Iligan Institute of Technology, Fellow for Fiction in Filipino
- 2003 2nd Iyas Creative Writing Workshop, University of St. La Salle-Bacolod, Fellow for Poetry in Filipino
- 2000 1st Ateneo de Manila University-Heights Literary Folio National Writers Workshop, Fellow for Fiction in Filipino
- 2000 1st University of Santo Tomas National Writers Workshop, Fellow for Fiction in Filipino
