= 1896 (musical) =

1995 musical by Charley dela Paz and Lucien Letaba

- Music: Lucien Letaba
- Lyrics: Charley dela Paz
- Setting: Spanish Philippines
- Premiere: 1995: UP Theater, Quezon City, Philippines
- Awards: 1995 Palanca Awards

1896 is a 1995 Philippine sung-through musical written by Charley dela Paz and composed by Lucien Letaba. It was commissioned by and staged under the Philippine Educational Theater Association (PETA). It centers around the Philippine Revolution at the latter part of the Spanish colonial rule in the Philippines. 1896 garnered the second prize for the Filipino-language full length play category in the 1995 Palanca Awards.

== Background ==
1896 was being planned as early as 1994. The Philippine Educational Theater Association (PETA) commissioned Charley dela Paz to write the libretto for the musical while Lucien Letaba was tasked to compose the music. It was first staged by PETA in 1995. While PETA is based at the open-air Raha Sulayman Theater at Fort Santiago in Intramuros, Manila at that time, it staged 1896 at the University of the Philippines Theater since it was deemed as a major production. From August to September 1995, alone 1896 was performed 30 times. The musical is also PETA's first sung-through musical.

The musical was staged several more times in the run-up to the 1998 Philippine Centennial. It was re-run a few times thereafter.

== Cast ==
Character	Cast
Andres Bonifacio	Rody Vera
Emilio Jacinto	Ariel Rivera
Emilio Aguinaldo	Bodjie Pascua / Lionel Guico
Oryang	May Bayot / Cynthia Culig-Guico

The musical also featured Noel Cabangon and the PETA Kalinangan Ensemble headed by Teresa Villasin. The ensemble performed the musical's chorus.
