= Tony Perez (playwright) =

- Born: Antonio Benjamin Silva Perez; March 31, 1951; San Fernando, Pampanga, Philippines
- Died: May 20, 2025 (aged 74); Quezon City, Philippines
- Citizenship: Filipino
- Education: Ateneo de Manila University; Maryhill School of Theology
- Occupations: Artist, writer

Antonio Benjamin Silva Perez (March 31, 1951 – May 20, 2025) was a Filipino playwright, writer, visual artist, and paranormal investigator.

== Early life and education ==
Antonio Benjamin Silva Perez was born on March 31, 1951, in San Fernando, Pampanga, Philippines. He spent his childhood in the town where his colonel father was stationed.

Perez is a product of the Ateneo de Manila University system, attending the institution's high school. In college, he pursued a bachelor's degree in communications in 1972. He then pursued a master's degree in clinical psychology at the university's Graduate School of Arts and Sciences from 1972 to 1977.

He later pursued master's degree in religious studies at the Maryhill School of Theology in Quezon City after attending from 1998 to 2004, graduating magna cum laude.

== Career ==
=== Theater, literature and arts ===
Perez promoted the role of psychological realism in modern Philippine drama. He believed his focus on the Filipino psyche rather than social issues is what differentiate himself from other playwrights. His peak years as a playwright were from the 1960s to the 1990s. Tony Perez's earlier play, Sierra Lakes, explores four people's struggles with love. Bombita satirizes military training and blind obedience, while Nobyembre examines the absence of love in a contemporary Filipino middle-class man.

Among his other works include Hoy, Boyet, Tinatawag Ka Na; Hatinggabi Na'y Gising Ka Pa Pala, Anak ng Araw, Gabun, K-31, Luwalhati, Florante At Laura (The Musical), Ang Prinsipe Ng Buwan, and Sa Pugad Ng Adarna (The Musical).

As a resident of Cubao in Quezon City since 1955, Perez has published a novel series based on his residence. This include the gay liberation literature Cubao 1980 at Iba Pang Katha, and Cubao Ilalim (2021) which features a magic expert and writer exploring an underground Kingdom of Berbania below Cubao. He also wrote The Calling: A Transpersonal Adventure, Mga Panibagong Orasyon, and Mga Panibagong Kulam Sa Pag-ibig.

Perez was a painter who had his works exhibited and did private commissions. Influenced by his Maryhill background, Perez did religious art. He was also a poet, an essayist and a fiber artist.

=== Paranormal investigation and mysticism ===
Tony Perez is noted for being into mysticism, spirits, and elementals. He formed the paranormal investigation group Spirit Questors in 1995. This emerged from the class of Perez, who was teaching the elective Psychic Powers and Shamanism under the Interdisciplinary Studies Program of the Ateneo de Manila University. They would often visit reportedly haunted places responding to invites of people having paranormal problems pro bono. These visits are called "quests", and members who partake on these operations are "questors".

The exploits of the Spirit Questors were featured in the The Spirit Quest Chronicles in the Inquirer Lifestyle newspaper until June 1997.

A Baguio chapter of the Spirit Questors was established by university student Dion Fernandez in 1997. The main Manila organization disbanded in 2011, with the Baguio chapter folding later.

== Death ==
Perez died on May 20, 2025 in Quezon City at the age of 74.

== Accolades ==
Year	Award	Category	Nominee / Work	Result	Ref.
1974	Cultural Center of the Philippines	Thirteen Artists Award	Tony Perez	Won	
1975	22nd FAMAS Award	Best Story	Tatlo, Dalawa, Isa	Won	
1984	34th Palanca Award	Grand prize for Novel (Filipino Division)	Tony Perez	Won	
1985	CCP Playwrighting Contest	—	Sa North Diversion Road	Won (3rd place)	
1999	Cultural Center of the Philippines	Centennial Honors for the Arts	Tony Perez	Won	
2006	Manila Critics Circle National Book Awards	Best Children's Book	Inang Bayan's New Clothes (Mga Bag-ong Sinina ni Inahang Nasod), co-authored by Agnes Caballa	Nominated	
