= Rowena Tiempo Torrevillas =

Filipina poet, writer, and essayist

- Born: Rowena Lopez Tiempo; June 13, 1951 (age 75); Dumaguete, Philippines
- Education: Silliman University
- Occupations: Poet, fiction writer, essayist
- Employer: University of Iowa
- Spouse: Lemuel Torrevillas
- Children: Lauren Maria Torrevillas Seamans
- Parent(s): Edilberto K. Tiempo; Edith L. Tiempo

Rowena Tiempo Torrevillas (born Rowena Lopez Tiempo; June 13, 1951) is a Filipina poet, fiction writer and essayist.

== Personal life and education ==
She was born to writers Edilberto K. Tiempo and Edith L. Tiempo in Dumaguete, Philippines. Torrevillas received a bachelor's degree in 1971, and a masters in 1978, both in creative writing. She also received a PhD in English Literature, all from Silliman University. She married Multimedia artist Lemuel Torrevillas and together they have a daughter, Lauren Maria Torrevillas Seamans .

== Career ==
Torrevillas worked for the International Writing Program (IWP) as the associate program coordinator. She worked for the University of Iowa's English department as an adjunct faculty member. Torrevillas has also been the director-in-residence of the Silliman National Writer's Workshop.

== Awards ==
- The Palanca Award
  - 1977 - Second Prize: Prodigal Season
  - 1978 - Second Prize: Sunday Morning
  - 1979 - First Prize: Behind the Fern
  - 1980 - First Prize: The Fruit of the Vine
  - 1983 -First Prize: Seeress and Voyager

== Works ==
- Flying Over Kansas: Personal Views (1999)
- The Sea Gypsies Stay (1999)
- The World Comes to Iowa
- Upon the Willows and Other Stories (1980)
- Mountain Sacraments (1991)
- Generic Dreams
- Three Times Three:Three Genres by Three Generations of Tiempo Women
- The Roadrunner
