= David Michael San Juan =

Filipino Marxist writer, researcher, activist and professor

- Born: David Michael San Juan
- Occupations: Writer, activist, professor
- Awards: Mananaysay ng Taon (2009); Makata ng Taon (2010); Philippine Normal University's Gawad Sulo for Eminent Alumni in Education Sciences and Various Areas of Specialization in Education (2025)

Academic background
- Education: Bulacan State University (BSE); Philippine Normal University (MA); Centro Escolar University (PhD)

David Michael M. San Juan is a Filipino writer, activist, and professor.

== Education ==
San Juan graduated with a Bachelor in Secondary Education (BSE), major in Filipino, magna cum laude, from Bulacan State University and a Master of Arts (MA) in Teaching Filipino from the Philippine Normal University. He later earned his Doctor of Philosophy (PhD) in Southeast Asian Studies from Centro Escolar University.

== Professional Experience and Public Service ==
San Juan is a full professor in the Filipino/Philippine Studies Department at De La Salle University. He also currently serves as the Commissioner for Cultural Dissemination of the National Commission for Culture and the Arts and president of the Association of Faculty and Educators of DLSU (AFED). He was also among the nominees of ACT Teachers Partylist in past elections He also served as the president of the Pambansang Samahan sa Linggwistika at Literaturang Filipino (PSLLF; National Organization of Philippine Linguistics and Literature)

In his last year in college, he was elected president of the University-wide Student Government-Supreme Student Council and concurrently served as the Student Regent of Bulacan State University, having previously served as Managing Editor of Pacesetter, the said university's official student publication.

== Awards ==
San Juan was declared Mananaysay ng Taon (Essayist of the Year) in 2009 and Makata ng Taon (Poet of the Year) in 2010 by the Komisyon sa Wikang Filipino (KWF or Commission on the Filipino Language).

In 2025, he was among the awardees for the Philippine Normal University's Gawad Sulo (Torch Award) for Eminent Alumni in Education Sciences and Various Areas of Specialization in Education.

In 2024, De La Salle University bestowed him with the St. Jaime Hilario Pillar of Lasallian Excellence in Community Engagement in the 12th Pillar of Lasallian Educators Excellence Awards.

In 2012, he presented a paper on "wang-wang" (literally: "siren" or "alarm", figuratively "call to action" for citizens and government) which was declared the Philippines' "Salita ng Taon" (Word of the Year) in a conference organized by the Filipinas Institute of Translation. In 2014, he co-presented a paper on "endo" (end of contract; Filipino colloquial term for labor contractualization/flexibilization) with John Kelvin R. Briones, which was declared as the Philippines' 2nd Word of the Year then. He was also a finalist in a 2009 climate change-themed essay writing contest organized by the World Bank

== Advocacies ==
As convener of Taumbayan Ayaw sa Magnanakaw at Abusado Network Alliance (TAMA NA; People Against Thieves and Abusive Ones Network Alliance), he co-organized the 2025 Baha sa Luneta anti-corruption rally. He led the online petition "to block the creation of the Maharlika Wealth Fund principally because it will use pension funds from the Government Service Insurance System (GSIS) and the Social Security System (SSS) which will be placed in high-risk investments with no representation from pension contributors." Along with popular clamor expressed in street protests, the said petition helped convince Congress to remove the provision allowing the use of GSIS and SSS funds for the controversial Maharlika Wealth Fund. San Juan also helped draft and advocate for the passage of the Tax Reform Act for the Masses and the Middle Class (TRAMM) which intends to reduce personal income tax rates for workers in the Philippines. He was also the co-founder of the language advocacy group Tanggol Wika which lobby for the restoration of Filipino language and literature core courses in Philippine universities.

== Notable Publications ==
He wrote an essay on "Noynoying" (a Filipino coined term which means "government inaction" on social ills) which was translated in French. He also pioneered the use of the term Scopus-centrism to criticize the practice of global ranking agencies and universities that prioritize only publications listed in the Elsevier-owned Scopus database.

His other notable publications are listed below:

=== Books ===
- Language and Education Policies in the Philippines: Critique and Alternatives. (2023). Center for Philippine Studies, Research Institute for Culture and Language, Polytechnic University of the Philippines.
- Sosyalismo sa Kontekstong Pilipino. (Socialism in the Philippine Context.). (2023). Makati: Academia Filipina Press.

=== Book Chapters ===
- Poverty, Living Wage and Income Inequality in the Developing World: Views and Visions from the Philippines. in Global Poverty. (2023). Raju J. Das & Deepak K. Mishra (eds.). Leiden: Brill.
- Counter-Hegemonic Discourses and Responses to Neoliberal Restructuring and Neocolonial Education: A Critical Evaluation of K–12's Development and Implementation in the Philippines. in Education and power in contemporary Southeast Asia. (2023). Azmil Tayeb et al. (eds.). Routledge.

=== Journal Articles ===
- Healthcare Advocacy & Legislation in the Philippines: Social Movement/Civil Society Alternatives to Privatization & Commodification. (2025). Social Sciences and Development Review 17 (1).
