= Ligaya Tiamson-Rubin =

Filipino writer

Ligaya G. Tiamson-Rubin (popularly known as 'Mam Gaying'), is a Filipino writer. A multiple Carlos Palanca Memorial Awards for Literature recipient, and currently a professor of the University of the Philippines Diliman. Today, she is teaching Filipino 25, Mga Ideya at Estilo (Ideas and Styles) under the Department of Filipino and Philippine Literature at the College of Arts and Letters, University of the Philippines Diliman in Diliman, Quezon City.

== Early life ==
Rubin was born in Angono, Rizal. She finished her Bachelor of Arts degree in Filipino at the University of the Philippines Diliman on 1966 and her Master of Arts in Teaching in 1971. She also held her Doctor of Philosophy degree at the same university, and taught Malikhaing Pagsulat (Creative Writing), Wika at Panitikan (Language and Literature) and Kulturang-bayan (Popular Culture).The year 2008 proved to be not just a celebration of the University's history, but also its brilliance as 41 faculty and alumni are feted in three of the country's most prominent awards.

The train started on July 25 when the National Commission for Culture and the Arts (NCCA) announced the winners for its biennial NCCA Writers Prize at the lobby of the NCCA building in Manila.

Four of the five NCCA awardees were College of Arts and Letters (CAL) faculty members Elyrah Loyola Salanga who won in the literary biography category and Prof. Rosario Cruz-Lucero (short story in English). The other winners were alumnus Edgardo B. Maranan (essay in English) and former UP National Writers Workshop (NWW) fellow Kristian S. Cordero (poetry in Bicolano).

The Gawad Alagad ni Balagtas also honored more than a few UP alumni and affiliates.

The award, which recognizes the contributions of Filipino writers, were given at UMPIL's (Unyon ng mga Manunulat sa Pilipinas) 34th National Congress on August 30 at the Government Securities and Insurance System Museum of the Cultural Center of the Philippines in Manila.

Prof. Ligaya Tiamson Rubin of the Departamento ng Filipino at Panitikan ng Pilipinas (DFPP) received the Gawad Paz Marquez Benitez award, which is given to outstanding educators in the field of literature and communication. Rubin was cited for her “dynamic, intense and penetrating approach to the teaching of language and Filipino literature.”

Among the recipients of the Gawad Pambansang Alagad were Prof. Ruperta VR. Asuncion (UP Los Baños), Prof. Delfin Tolentino (UP Baguio Cordillera Studies Center director) and alumnus Edgardo B. Maranan.

Asunción was recognized for her contributions to Ilocano literature and Tolentino for his “wide-ranging and intense examinations of Filipino art and culture,” in his essays in English. Maranan was commended for his versatility in poetry in English and Filipino.

The University's presence was also heavily felt at the annual Philippines Free Press Literary Awards, held on August 26 at the Mandarin Oriental Hotel during its centennial celebration.

CAL faculty member Celeste Flores Coscolluela and workshop fellow Mads Bajarias placed second and third in the short story category. Former fellows Larry Ypil and former CAL lecturer Lakambini Sitoy also took the same places in the essay category.

Meanwhile, all the awards in the poetry category went to former fellows of the UP NWW: Cesar Ruiz Aquino, Marjorie Evasco and Lourd de Veyra in first, second and third place, respectively.

The same thing happened in the 58th Palanca Awards for Literature, with UP taking the lion's share of awards.

Institute of Creative Writing (ICW) Deputy Director Prof. José Claudio B. Guerrero, CAL alumna Katrina Stuart Santiago and workshop fellow Jhoanna Lynn B. Cruz dominated in the essay in English category.

In the poetry in English category, UP writers Francis C. Macansantos, Ana María Katigbak and Marie La Viña won the first, second, and third place, respectively.

2008 UP workshop co-fellows Ian Rosales Casocot and Tara FT Sering placed first and second in the short story category in English while UP alumnae Nadine L. Sarreal claimed third place. Meanwhile, Law student Jing Panganiban-Mendoza, Michael M. Coroza and CAL faculty member Prof. Eugene Y. Evasco won in the essay in Filipino category.

Workshop fellows Miguel Syjuco and Norman Wilwayco took home the grand prize for the novel in English and Filipino, respectively. It was Wilwayco's fourth Palanca and his second for the novel in Filipino category. He took home the grand prize in 2002.

Former ICW associates Prof. Leoncio P. Deriada and Prof. Aurelio S. Agcaoili won the first prize in the short story in Hiligaynon and third place short story in Iluko categories, respectively.

Other UP alumni, workshop fellows and faculty members who took home prizes were: Lemuel E. Garcellano 2nd and Rommel B. Rodriguez 3rd, in the short story in Filipino category; April Jade B. Imson 2nd and Allan Alberto N. Derain 3rd, in the short story for children in Filipino category; Niles Jordan Breis 3rd, poetry in Filipino; Allan B. López (3rd, one-act play in Filipino); Dennis M. Marasigan (2nd, screenplay, 2nd); Lilia T. Tio 3rd, short story in Cebuano; Ariel S. Tabag 3rd, short story in Iluko; and Joachim Emilio B. Antonio 3rd, one-act play in English category.

== Published works ==
=== Biography ===
- Angono, Rizal 4 : Sa Mata ng mga Iskolar ng Bayan (In the Eyes of Nation's Scholars)
- Angono, Rizal 5 : Persona at Pamumuhay (Persons and Living)

=== History ===
- Angono, Rizal 3 : Mga Talang Wika at Pangkasaysayan (Language and Historical Writings)

=== Literature ===
- Paano Nagsusulat ang Isang Ina? (How a Mother Write a Poem?)— 1981 Carlos Palanca Memorial Awards for Literature Third Place
- Turning Back and Moving Back— 1980 Carlos Palanca Memorial Awards for Literature Third Place
- Persona (Person)
- Sagradong Abo (Sacred Ashes)

=== Reference books ===
- Angono, Rizal 1 : Art Capital ng Pilipinas (Philippine Art Capital)
- Angono, Rizal 2 : Bukal ng Sining (Fountain of Art)
