= Jesús Manuel Santiago =

Filipino writer and musician

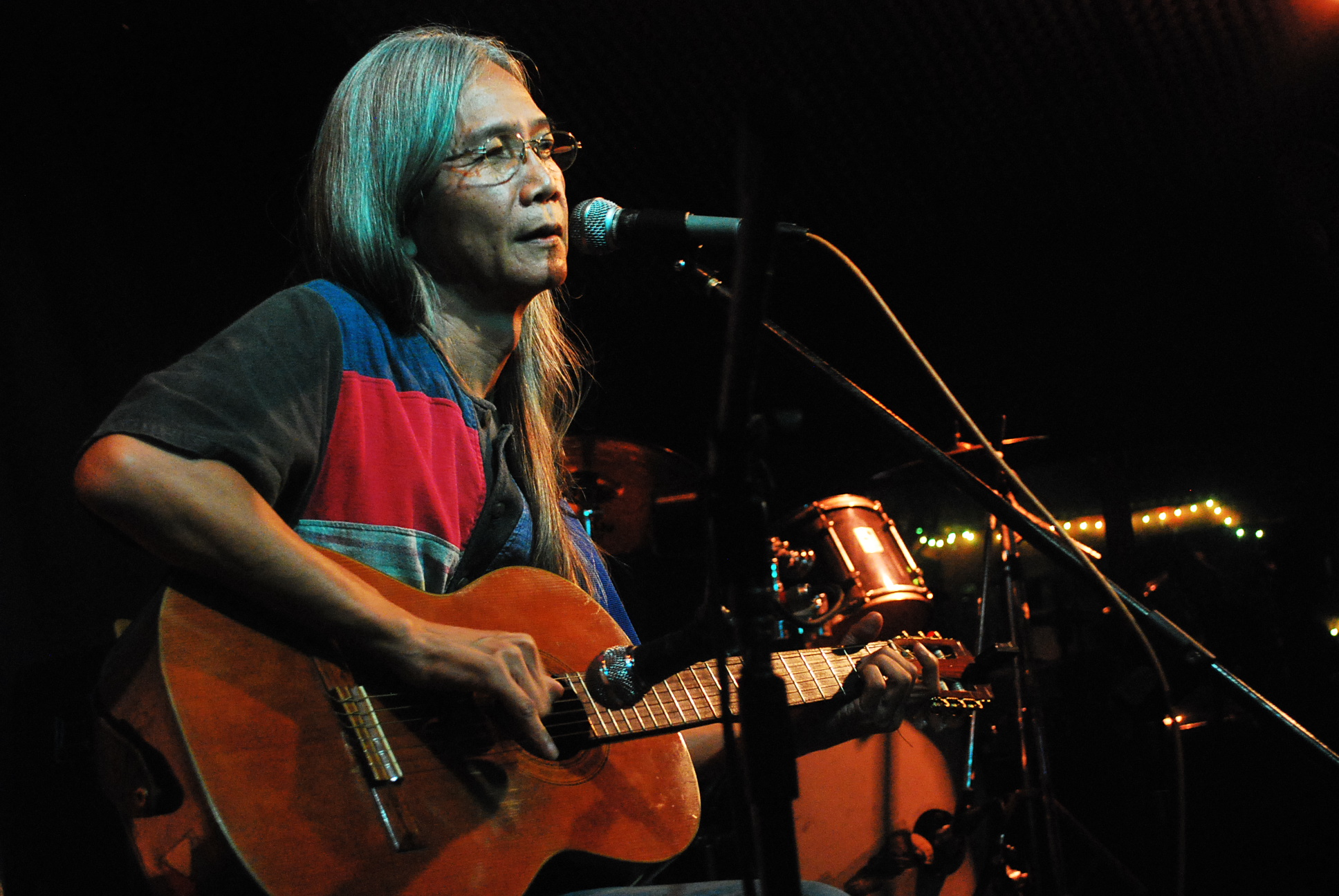
Santiago in 2009

Jesús Manuel Santiago, better known as Jess Santiago, is a Filipino poet, songwriter, singer-composer, protest musician and translator.

== Early life and family ==
He was born in Obando, Bulacan, Philippines. He was married to Lilia Quindoza Santiago, a professor in Filipino literature at the University of the Philippines, and also an accomplished poet and writer. They have four children: Haya Pagasa, Halina Mandala, Balagtas Himig Bayan, and Daniw.

== Career ==
=== Literary work ===
His poems had been published in both national and international magazines and anthologies including the Caravan magazine of the global group Alliance for the Responsible and United World. Caravan published his poem There is a Village in the Making which has also been translated from English into French. He was the Institute of Philippine Languages's Poet of the Year in 1978 and 1979. Santiago translated Lu Xun's "Diary of a Madman", Arthur Miller's Death of a Salesman into the Filipino language, as well as some songs and poems of Latin American and African-Asian writers.

=== Musical work ===
Among his music albums are Halina (1990) and Obando (1993). These albums include the songs Huling Balita (Last News), Martsa ng Bayan (March of the Nation), the lullaby Meme Na (Sleep Now) and Pitong Libong Pulo (Seven Thousand Islands). His themes and the Filipino lower-class characters in his songs evolved from the political and social realities during the decade of Marcos despotism in the 1970s.

Santiago was also awarded the Mother Country Award by the Polytechnic University of the Philippines because of his role as a figurehead in the people's music movement in the Philippines. He was a member of the Galian sa Arte at Tula, Cultural Action Program of the Asian Cultural Forum on Development (ACFOD), Asia-Pacific Regional Consultation on People's Culture, and National Union of Writers in the Philippines (PANULAT). He had been composing and performing for 15 years. He also has a column Usapang Kanto (Street Corner Talk) on the pages of the Pinoy Weekly newspaper in the Philippines.
