= Rogelio Mangahas =

Filipino artist and poet (1939–2018)

Rogelio Mangahas (9 May 1939 – 4 July 2018) was a Filipino artist and poet.

Born in Palasinan, Cabiao, Nueva Ecija, Philippines, he was educated at the University of the East where he studied AB Filipino. Even then, he was already seeking others who shared the same interest in language, by spending most of his time with poet-friends such as Virgilio S. Almario and Teo Antonio at the University of the East. Together they spearheaded the second successful modernist movement in Filipino poetry.

Rogelio Mangahas is a Palanca first prize winner for his collection of poems, "Mga Duguang Plakard" and for his critical essay on Edgardo M. Reyes's novel, "Sa mga Kuko ng Liwanag." He co-authored and edited Manlilikha, an anthology of poems, considered by some critics as a monumental achievement in modern Filipino poetry in the 1960s.

Winner of the 1986 Palanca Awards under essay.

He worked as editor-in-chief of Phoenix Publishing House and of SIBS Publishing House and taught Filipino language and literature at De La Salle University, University of the East, University of the Philippines Manila and St. Scholastica's College. He served as a consultant for literature at the Cultural Center of the Philippines and country editor of Tenggara, a literary journal of Southeast Asia published in Malaysia.

He was a recipient of 'Poet of the Year' award from SWP and Gawad Pambansang Alagad ni Balagtas from UMPIL (Writers Union of the Philippines).

He died on 4 July 2018 at the age of 79.
