= Angelo Rodriguez Lacuesta =

Sarge Lacuesta
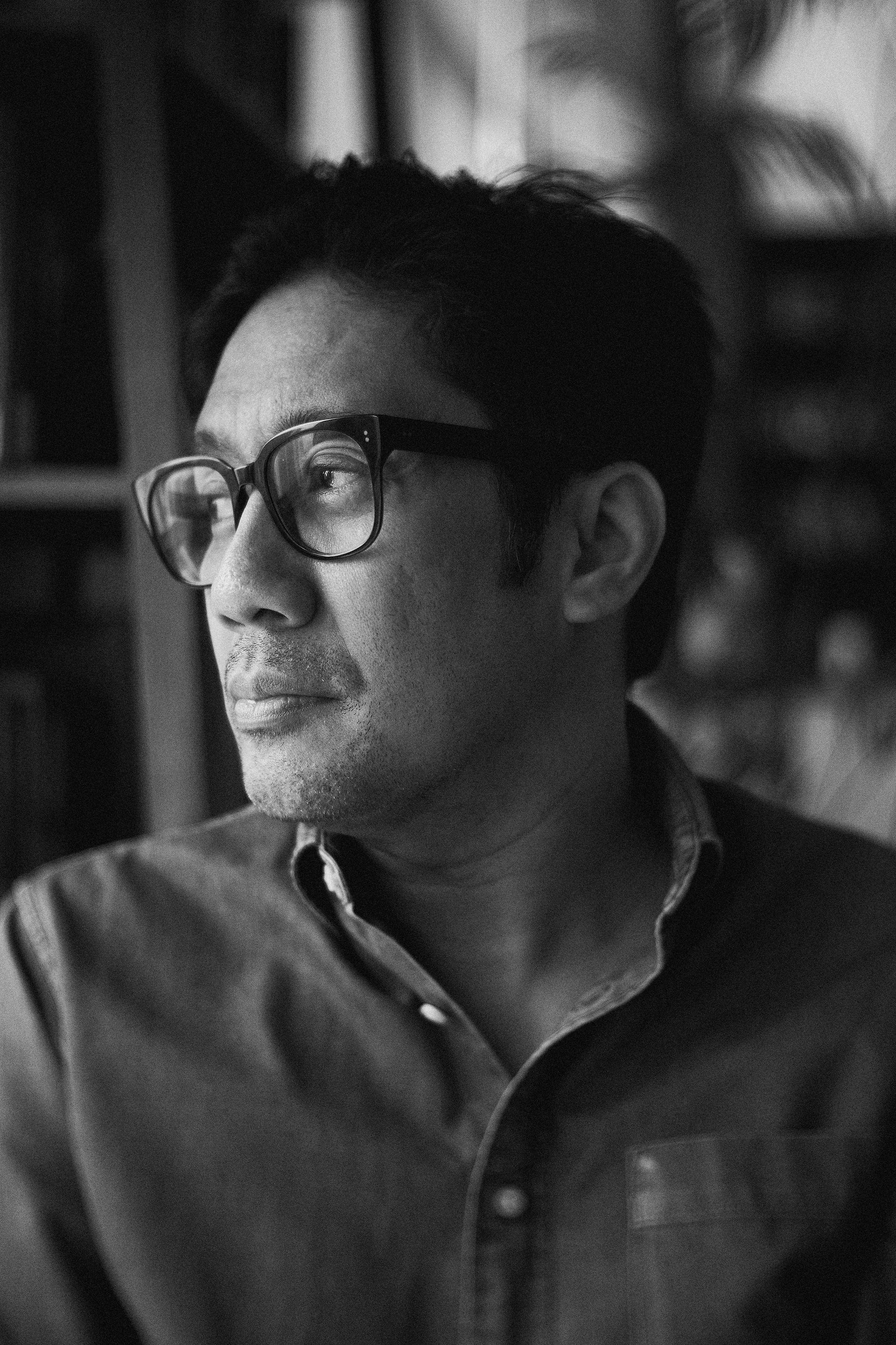
- Full Name: Amado Angelo Rodriguez Lacuesta
- Born: April 11, 1970 (age 55) Philippines
- Education: Ateneo de Manila University University of the Philippines Diliman
- Occupation: Writer, screenwriter, filmmaker
- Spouse: Mookie Katigbak-Lacuesta
- Children: 1
- Parents: Amado Lacuesta; Lolita Rodriguez-Lacuesta
- Website: https://arlacuesta.ph/

Amado Angelo "Sarge" Rodriguez Lacuesta (born April 11, 1970) is a Filipino writer known for his short stories, novels, and screenplays. He has won National Book Awards, the NVM Gonzalez Award, numerous Palanca Memorial Awards and Philippine Graphic Awards, and the inaugural Madrigal Gonzalez Best First Book Award.

He is currently the president of PEN (Poets, Essayists, Novelists) Philippines and serves as editor-at-large for Esquire Magazine (Philippines). He is also the nonfiction editor of Panorama: The Journal of Intelligent Travel.

Lacuesta has represented the Philippines in international literary fellowships, residencies, and conferences. Alongside his literary career, he leads Good Intentions Books, an independent publishing company.

== Early life and education ==
Lacuesta was born in 1970 in Cebu City, Philippines. He is the son of the late banker and screenwriter Amado Lacuesta, known for his work on Working Girls, and essayist Lolita Rodriguez-Lacuesta.

He attended the basic education unit of the Ateneo de Manila University for his primary and secondary education before earning a degree in Biology from the University of the Philippines Diliman. Although initially accepted into the Integrated Liberal Arts and Medicine (INTARMED) Program at UP, a fast-track path to medical school, he chose to pursue his undergraduate degree first. Eventually, he decided to leave medical school to focus on writing.

== Career ==
Lacuesta began writing at a young age, publishing his first poem in The Manila Times at age 15 and his first short story in Philippine Graphic in 1995. Shortly after leaving medical school, he transitioned to a career in advertising, working at Basic Advertising in 1993 and later at J. Walter Thompson in 1995.

As a literary figure, Lacuesta has published several critically acclaimed books. His first short story collection, Life Before X and Other Stories (2000), won both the Madrigal-Gonzalez Best First Book Award and the National Book Award. His subsequent collection, White Elephants: Stories (2005) also received the National Book Award.

From 2006 to 2009, he was the literary editor for The Philippines Free Press.

In 2018, Lacuesta and his wife, poet Mookie Katigbak-Lacuesta, founded Good Intentions Books, an independent publishing house aimed at supporting Filipino talent across all aspects of publishing, from writing to design and printing, while promoting a sustainable model for both commercial and literary works.

In 2024, Lacuesta wrote and produced An Errand, which premiered at the 2024 Cinemalaya Philippine Independent Film Festival. It was his second screenplay, following Song of the Fireflies, which he also produced. Song of the Fireflies was filmed earlier and is set to have its international premiere at the Manila International Film Festival in Los Angeles, California, in 2025.

His upcoming novel, IRÔ (Milflores, 2025), was selected as one of 10 novels to be presented for possible film adaptation at the “Books at Berlinale” section of the 2025 Berlinale Film Festival.

== Selected recent work ==
=== Coral Cove and Other Stories ===
Published in 2017 by the University of Santo Tomas Publishing House, Coral Cove and Other Stories is a collection of short stories that explores complex themes of identity, time, and memory.

The eleven stories are set against the backdrop of the Philippines' rich history. Its title story is a speculative fiction piece that explores love, technology, and a dystopian future. Other stories in the collection examine the blurring lines between fact and fiction, original and imitation, and the interplay of past, present, and future.

Reviewer Natalia Delazari noted that Lacuesta's work is “worth every effort the reader makes.” She writes:

Each story in Coral Cove makes sense as an individual piece, but the whole collection, viewed from above, demonstrates certain patterns tying the stories together. A short phrase early in the collection unexpectedly resurfaces, verbatim, on its last pages, or two different characters separated by several stories are “baptised” with the same surname. Seemingly random, these details nevertheless trigger a round of re-reading in search for some stability among the anticlimactic plots and blurred timelines, under the country's omnipresent heat.

Coral Cove and Other Stories won the Best Book of Short Fiction at the 37th National Book Awards.

=== A Waiting Room Companion ===
A Waiting Room Companion is a 2017 non-fiction book published by Ateneo de Manila University Press. The collection brings together essays, explorations, and profiles that span Lacuesta's career, including his tenure as editor-at-large at Esquire Philippines. The book was a finalist for the prestigious Philippine National Book Award.

Lacuesta's writing has been praised for its humor, depth, and clarity. A reviewer in Philippines Graphic compared his prose to that of Michael Chabon and Joseph Epstein, highlighting his skill in discussing diverse subjects such as family, travel, sex, and aging. The reviewer writes:

Here, the author speaks as the swordsman on the hill, unguarded by the rules of fiction and the shackles of rhyme. Lacuesta has taken all that into his hands and soared with it, and added tiers of insight into what could otherwise had just been a petty, self-serving memoir.

=== Stay: 21 Stories ===
Stay: 21 Stories is a 2018 comics anthology that presents a collection of 21 original stories, exploring themes of “horror, violence, romance and sex.” Launched at Komikon, the collection was created in collaboration with 17 artists, including photographer Shaira Luna and visual artist Igan D'Bayan. Lacuesta noted that the process of working with artists added new dimensions to his stories.

The anthology received critical acclaim, being named one of the Best Filipino Comics of 2018 by CNN Philippines and was a finalist for the Philippine National Book Award. One of the comic stories in the collection, “Bedweather” won first runner up in the Jeane Leiby Chapbook Contest at the Florida Review, while another, “Triple Phantasy,” was a runner-up in the same contest. Stay was also featured in the official Philippine catalog for the several consecutive years at the Frankfurt Buchmesse.

=== JOY: A Novel ===
JOY: A Novel is Lacuesta's debut novel, published by Penguin Random House Southeast Asia in 2022. Spanning multiple decades, the novel reflects the fragmented yet interconnected lives of contemporary Filipinos. In discussing the novel, Lacuesta emphasized the difference between writing short stories and novels. He told Lifestyle Inquirer:

A book of 10 short stories, for example, is really 10 separate discrete worlds, each with its own tone, temperament and momentum. This is why it's harder to complete a book of short stories than one thinks! But a novel—to me it's a singularity, in all the senses of that word: completely distinct and peculiar; infinite and condensed; and capable of conflating leaps in language, form and content all at once.

=== An Errand ===
Originally published as a short story in Coral Cove and Other Stories, An Errand was adapted into a feature film in 2024 by director Dominic Bekaert. Premiering at the Cinemalaya Film Festival, An Errand merges drama, film noir, and psychological thriller, offering a nuanced exploration of power dynamics and existential crisis.

The film follows a driver named Moroy on an existential journey from Baguio to Manila to retrieve a trivial item—Viagra—for his boss. As the errand progresses, Moroy reflects on memories and fantasies, blending reality with introspection.

The film received critical acclaim for its slow-burn narrative and meticulous visual composition, with one reviewer even drawing comparisons to European arthouse cinema. ClickTheCity noted the film's existential undertones, likening it to works such as Jonathan Glazer's Under the Skin (2013 film) and Shane Carruth's Upstream Color (2013 film). Meanwhile, PhilStar Life emphasized the psychological complexity of An Errand and its incisive commentary on class divides, drawing parallels to Bong Joon-ho's Parasite (2019 film).

An Errand premiered on August 5, 2024, as part of the Full Length Main Competition category at the Cinemalaya Independent Film Festival. It was selected to be part of the Bright Futures section of the International Film Festival Rotterdam (IFFR).

== Personal life ==
Lacuesta is married to the poet Mookie Katigbak-Lacuesta.

Lacuesta has a child named Lucas Lacuesta.

== Selected bibliography ==
Year	Book	Publisher	Notes
2000	Life Before X and Other Stories	University of the Philippines Press	Short stories
2004	White Elephants: Stories	Anvil Publishing	Short stories
2009	Flames and Other Stories	Anvil Publishing	Short stories
2015	Stigmata and other Stories	Et Al Books	Short stories
2015	Contra Mundum: On the Film Restoration of Nick Joaquin's A Portrait of the Artist as Filipino	Miguel P. De Leon Publishing	Non-Fiction
2017	A Waiting Room Companion	Ateneo de Manila University Press	Essays
2017	Coral Cove and Other Stories	UST Publishing House	Short stories
2018	Stay: 21 Stories	Good Intentions Books, Inc.	Comic book
2019	City Stories	Ateneo de Manila University Press	Short stories
2022	JOY: a novel	Penguin Random House SEA	Novel

== Filmography ==
Year	Book	Credit	Directed by
2024	An Errand	Writer/Producer	Dominic Bekaert
2024	Song of the Fireflies	Writer/Producer	King Palisoc

== Selected Awards ==
Year	Award	Category	Result
1995	Philippine Graphic Literary Awards	Fiction	Second Prize
1996	Philippine Graphic Literary Awards	Fiction	First Prize
1996	Palanca Awards for Literature	Short Story for Children	Third Prize
1998	Philippine Graphic Literary Awards	Fiction	First Prize
1999	Palanca Awards for Literature	Short Story	First Prize
2000	National Book Award for Fiction	Fiction	Winner
2001	Madrigal-Gonzales Best First Book Award		Winner
2001	Palanca Awards for Literature	Short Story	Second Prize
2004	NVM Gonzales Award for Fiction	Fiction	First Prize and Finalist (two separate stories)
2004	Philippines Free Press Award for Short Story	Short Story	First Prize
2005	National Book Award / Juan C. Laya Prize	Fiction	Winner
2007	Palanca Awards for Literature	Short Story	First Prize
2013	Philippines Graphic Nick Joaquin Literary Awards	Short Story	First Prize
2016	Philippines Graphic Nick Joaquin Literary Awards	Short Story	First Prize
2017	National Book Awards	Short Story Collection	Winner
