= Alfredo Navarro Salanga =

Filipino literary critic, journalist, editor and writer (1948–1988)

Alfredo "Freddie" Navarro Salanga (1948–1988) was a Filipino literary critic, columnist, journalist, novelist, poet and fictionist who served as the editor-in-chief of the San Pedro Express in Davao City in the 1970s. He was a member of the Manila Critics Circle. He was the author of 1984 novella The Birthing of Hannibal Valdez. He was nicknamed "Daddy Giant".

== Biography ==
In 1969, Salanga obtained a Bachelor of Arts degree from the Ateneo de Manila University in 1969. He was a former secretary-general of the Writers Union of the Philippines, a former director of the Philippine Board on Books for Young People, a former director of the Pinaglabanan Galleries, a former trustee of the Philippine Literary Arts Council (PLAC), and a former Director-General of the People's Movement for Press Freedom Task Force for the People's Right to Know. He had been a member of the following associations: the International PEN, Philippine Chapter, the Philippine's National Press Club, the Association for Philippines-China Understanding, the Philippine-British Society, and the Art Association of the Philippines.

== Awards ==
In 1969, Salanga became a recipient of the Mulry Award for Literary Excellence. He was also an awardee for the 1980, 1983, and 1985 Carlos Palanca Memorial Awards for Literature. He was a winner during the 1984–85 USA Annual Salute to the Arts Competition that was sponsored by Triton College in Illinois. In 1984, he won the Best Opinion Column award from the Catholic Mass Media Awards. In 1986, he won the Book of the Year award. He became one of the Ten Most Outstanding Men of the Year (TOYM) for Literature and Journalism in 1985.

== Works ==
Apart from The Birthing of Hannibal Valdez, Salanga's literary works included the following: The Aglipay Question: Literary and Historical Studies (1982), Commentaries Meditations Messages A Parable Cycles and Confessions (1985) and Portraits (1988). As an editor, Salanga edited the following literature: Rizaliana for Children: Drawings and Folk Tales by Jose Rizal (1984), New Writing from the Philippines (Philippine Studies, 1985), Versus: Philippine Protest Poetry, 1983–1986 (1986), Kamao: Panitikan ng Protesta, 1970–1986 (1987), An Anthology of Poets in Search of God, Posthumous: Turtle Voices in Uncertain Weather: Poems 1980-1988 (CCP, 1989), Chronicles & Dispatches (New Day, 1991), and Buenavista Ventures (Ateneo de Manila University Office of Research and Publications, 1998).
