= Edgardo Maranan =

Filipino writer (1946–2018)

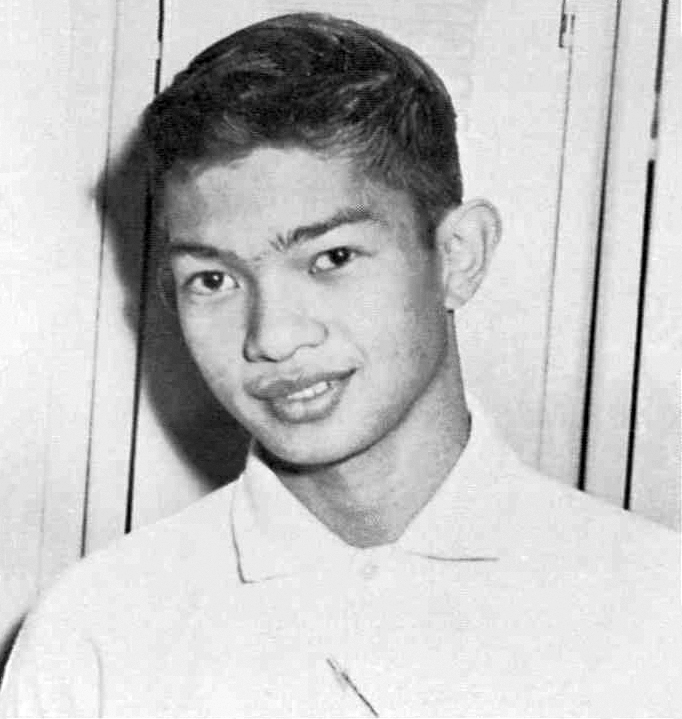
Edgardo Maranan in 1963

Edgardo B. Maranan (November 7, 1946 – May 8, 2018) was a Filipino poet, essayist, fiction writer, playwright, translator and writer of children's stories. He wrote in Filipino and in English.

== Early life ==
He was born in Bauan, Batangas, Philippines in 1946. He grew up in Baguio, where he finished his high school education.

He represented the Philippines at the 1963 New York Herald Tribune World Youth Forum at the age of 16. At the age of 18, he joined Kabataang Makabayan and became a student activist He became a professor at the University of the Philippines from 1970-1972 where he taught political science and joined the underground movement when martial law was declared by Marcos.

== Career ==
In 1985, he was the Philippine fellow at the Iowa International Writing program. He also became the National fellow for the poetry of the University of the Philippines creative writing center in 1988. He became a panelist at the Ubud Writers Festival in Bali in 2007. And he also served as a foreign information officer of the Philippine Embassy in London.

He returned to the Philippines in the late 2006 and had been a freelance writer.

== Death and legacy ==
Maranan died on May 8, 2018.

== Awards ==
- Palanca Awards first prize winning works
  - 1978 Ang Panahon ni Cristy - Full-length play
  - 1984 Voyage: Poem - Poetry
  - 1989 Pamana ng Bundok - Children's Short story
  - 1992 Island and Hinterland - Essay
  - 2000 Tabon and Other Poems - Poetry

In 2000 he was inducted into the Palanca Hall of Fame.
