= Mike Bigornia =

Filipino poet, editor, fictionist and translator

Mike Bigornia (born 16 May 1950 in Bangued, Abra, Philippines) is a Filipino poet, editor, fictionist and translator. Bigornia was educated at the University of the East where he finished political science.

He was the immediate past chairman of the Unyon ng Mga Manunulat ng Pilipinas (UMPIL), and the recipient of several Palanca Awards.

He also won National Book Awards from the Manila Critics Circle for his collection of prose poems, Prosang Itim (Anvil) and Punta-Blanko. Bigornia, the Makata ng Taon in 1986, was a founding member of the Gallan sa Arte at Tula (GAT), along with fellow poets Virgilio Almario and Teo Antonio. He also worked as managing director for Phoenix Publishing House.
