= Teo Antonio =

Filipino poet (born 1946)

Teo Antonio (born 1946) is a Filipino poet. He was born in Sampaloc, Manila. He was educated at the University of Santo Tomas where he studied Fine Arts. Antonio is the son of Emilio Mar Antonio, hari ng balagtasan (King of Balagtasan—a Filipino form of poetic joust) during the 1950s.

Antonio garnered numerous Carlos Palanca Memorial Awards for Poetry in 1973. 1975, 1976. 1986 and 1998. He also received top prizes during the Centennial Literary Contest for his epic poem Piping-Dilat in 1998 as well as Manila Critics' Circle National Book Awards in 1982, 1991 and 1992. He also received a grant as Philippine Representative to the World Poetry Reading Summit in Kuala Lumpur, Malaysia in 1996.

Antonio received numerous other distinguished honors including the SEA Write Award from the King of Thailand in Bangkok (1995), Gawad Patnubay sa Kalinga para sa larangan ng panitikan from the City of Manila (1996), Dangal ng Lipi para sa sining at panulat from the Philippine Province of Bulacan (1997) and Gawad Alagad ni Balagtas (Lifetime Achievement Award) from the Unyon ng mga Manunulat sa Pilipinas (UMPIL)/Writers Union of the Philippines (2002).

Previously, Antonio was UMPIL director and President of the Unyon ng mga Tagasalin sa Pilipinas (UNTAP). Together with poets Virgilio Almario and Mike Bigornia, he co-founded Galian sa Arte at Tula (GAT), a writers' group. The University of the Philippines Press; The University of Santo Tomas Publishing House; The Ateneo de Manila University Press and Anvil Publishing have published Antonio's ten books. Antonio remains active in poetry jousts and readings across the Philippines as well as in selected international literary events.
