= Virgilio S. Almario =

Filipino author and poet (born 1944)

Virgilio Almario
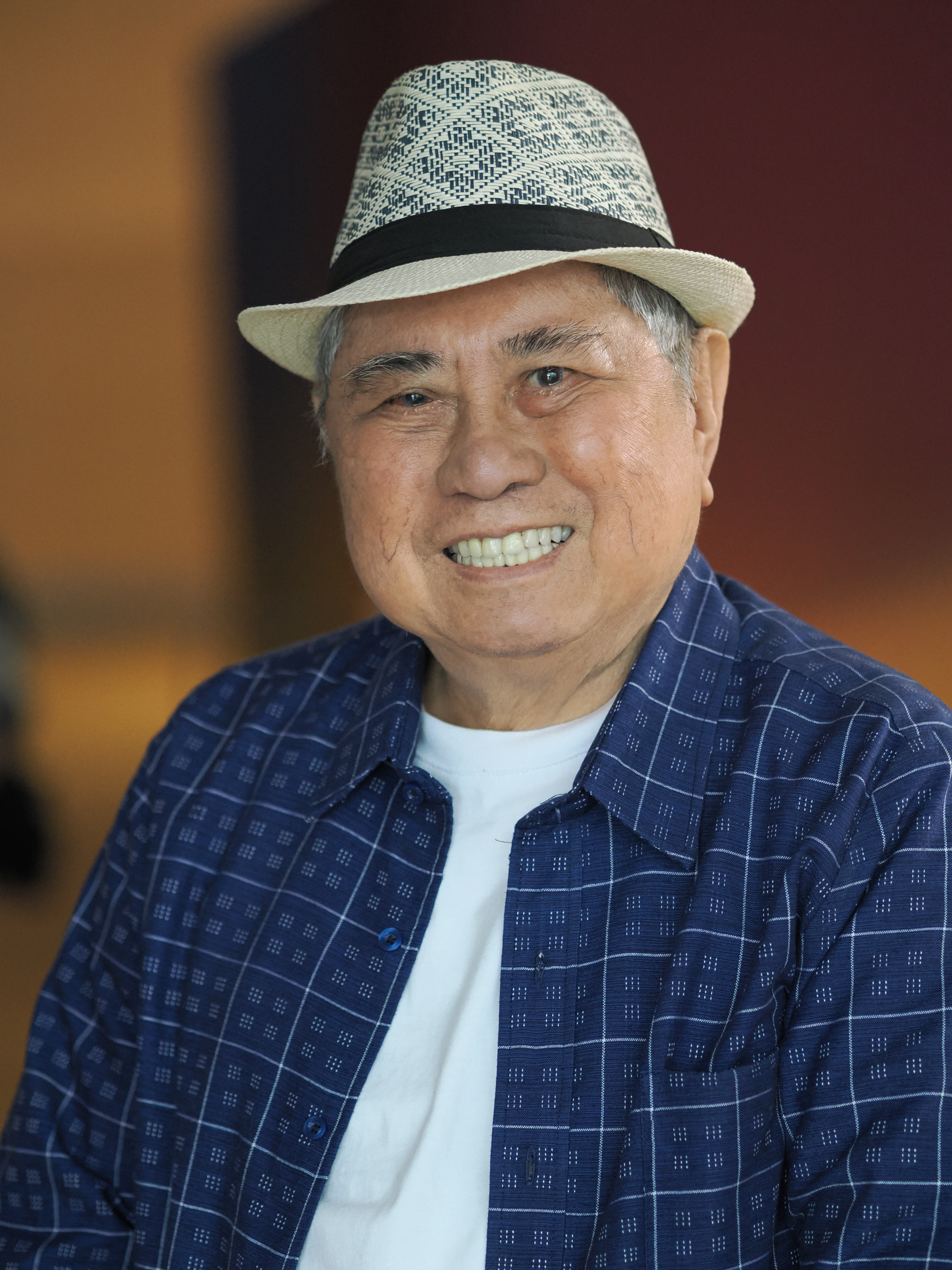
- Almario at the Frankfurt Book Fair in 2025
- Born: Virgilio Senadrin Almario; March 9, 1944 (age 82); San Miguel, Bulacan, Second Philippine Republic
- Education: University of the Philippines Diliman (BA, MA); University of the East
- Occupations: Poet; literary critic; lecturer; editor
- Spouse: Emelina B. Soriano
- Children: Asa Victoria, Ani Rosa, Agno Virgilio, Alan Ortiz
- Writing career
- Pen name: Rio Alma
- Notable awards: Order of National Artists of the Philippines; University of the Philippines Centennial Award, Amado V. Hernandez Award, Balagtas Award for Poetry and Essay
- Movement: Philippine Modernism

Virgilio Senadren Almario (born March 9, 1944), better known by his pen name Rio Alma, is a Filipino author, poet, critic, translator, editor, teacher, and cultural manager. He is a National Artist of the Philippines. He formerly served as the chairman of the Komisyon sa Wikang Filipino, the government agency mandated to promote and standardize the use of the Filipino language. On January 5, 2017, Almario was also elected as the chairman of the National Commission for Culture and the Arts.

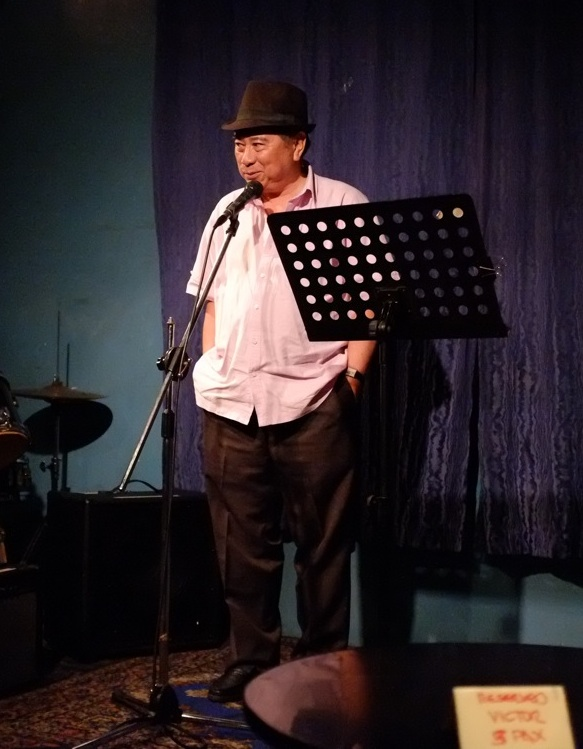
Virgilio Almario at a poetry reading in June 2011.

== Early life and education ==
Growing up in Bulacan, Almario sought his education at the City of Manila and completed his degree in A.B. Political Science at the University of the Philippines Diliman.

His life as a poet started when he took master's units in education at the University of the East where he became associated with Rogelio G. Mangahas and Lamberto E. Antonio. He did not finish the program.

He only took his M.A. in Filipino in 1974 at the University of the Philippines Diliman.

== Career ==
A prolific writer, he spearheaded the second successful modernist movement in Filipino poetry together with Mangahas and Antonio. His earliest pieces of literary criticism were collected in Ang Makata sa Panahon ng Makina (1972), now considered the first book of literary criticism in Filipino. Later, in the years of martial law, he set aside modernism and formalism and took interest in nationalism, politics and activist movement. As a critic, his critical works deal with the issue of national language.

Almario campaigned against the usage and proliferation of siyokoy words in the Filipino language, which according to him were improperly derived from English and Spanish. He also advocated the use of Filipinas as the Philippines official name in both Filipino and English languages.

Aside from being a critic, Almario engaged in translating and editing. He has translated the best contemporary poets of the world. He has also translated for theater production the plays of Nick Joaquin, Bertolt Brecht, Euripides and Maxim Gorki. Other important translations include the famous works of the Philippines' national hero, José Rizal, namely Noli Me Tangere and El filibusterismo. For these two, he was awarded the 1999 award for translation by the Manila Critics Circle.

Almario has been a recipient of numerous awards such as several Palanca Awards, two grand prizes from the Cultural Center of the Philippines, the Makata ng Taon of the Komisyon sa Wikang Filipino, the TOYM for literature, and the Southeast Asia Write Award of Bangkok.

He was an instructor at the Lagao Central Elementary School from 1969 to 1972. In 2003, he was appointed Dean of the College of Arts and Letters at the University of the Philippines Diliman. On June 25 of the same year, he was proclaimed National Artist for Literature.

Almario is also the founder and workshop director of the Linangan sa Imahen, Retorika, at Anyo, an organization of poets who write in Filipino. Award-winning writers and poets such as Roberto and Rebecca Añonuevo, Romulo Baquiran Jr., Michael Coroza, Jerry Gracio, and Vim Nadera are some of the products of that organization's workshop.

He was a founding member of the Gallan sa Arte at Tula, along with fellow poets Teo Antonio and Mike Bigornia.

== Works ==
=== Poetry collections ===
- Makinasyon at Ilang Tula (1968)
- Peregrinasyon at Iba Pang Tula (1970)
- Doktrinang Anakpawis (1979)
- Mga Retrato at Rekwerdo (1984)
- Palipad-Hangin (1985)
- (A)lamat at (H)istorya (1986)
- Katon para sa Limang Pandama (1987)
- Selected Poems, 1968-1985 (1987)
- Mga Retaso ng Liwanag (1990)
- Muli, sa Kandungan ng Lupa (1994)
- Una Kong Milenyum (1998)
- Supot ni Hudas (2002)
- Sentimental (2004)
- Estremelenggoles (2004)
- Ang Hayop na Ito! (2004)
- Sari-Sari (2004)
- Sonetos Postumos book of poems with translation by Marne Kilates and paintings by National Artist Ang Kiukok (2004)
- Memo Mulang Gimokudan (2005)
- Dust Devils (2005)
- Tatlong Pasyon sa Ating Panahon, poems for children with illustrations by Mark Justiniani, Neil Doloricon, Ferdinand Doctolero (2006)
- Kung Bakit Kailangan ang Himala (2007)
- Mga Biyahe, Mga Estasyon (2008)
- Isang Sariling Panahon (2008)
- Romanza (2008)
- Buwan, Buwang Bulawan (2009)
- Huling Hudhud ng Sanlibong Pagbabalik at Paglimot para sa Filipinas Kong Mahal (2009)
- Ang Romansa ng Pagsagip ng Osong Marso (2013)
- Lungting Lungsod ng Lunggati (2013)
- May Mga Damdaming Higit Kaysa Atin (2015)
- Sa Oras ng Tindera't Kriminal (2016)
- ]Kuwarentena[ (2020)
- Mga Poon, Mga Piyon, Mga Pusong, Isang Pusong (2022)
- Lemlunay: Pagunita sa Gunita (2023)
- Ay! Ang Kabihasnan (2024)
- Pasyon Kay EJ (At sa mga Atletang Pinoy sa Paris Olympics) (2024)
- Kanta Kay Josefina (2025)
- Kinutsaritang Liwanag (2026)

=== Non-fiction ===
- UP Diksiyonaryong Filipino
- Pambansang Diksiyonaryo sa Filipino
- Kulo at Kolorum
- Tradisyon at Wikang Filipino
- Filipino ng mga Filipino
- Ang Wikang Pambansa at Amerikanisasyon
- Sapantahàng Wika

== Filmography ==
- Sariling Gunita (2022), a documentary film directed by Mark Daniel De Castro.
