= Simeon Dumdum Jr. =

Simeon Dumdum Jr. (born March 7, 1948) is a former Regional Trial Court Judge in Cebu City, Philippines, and is a published poet. He once studied for the priesthood in Galway, Ireland, but left the seminary to take up law. After years of practicing law, he was appointed Regional Trial Court judge. He won prizes for his poetry, which he has published and read in the Philippines and abroad.

== Early years ==
He was born in Balamban, Cebu, where he grew up and had his early schooling. He attended St. Francis Academy for his secondary education, and then went to St. Clement's College in Iloilo City, where he did a year of college. In Ireland, he went to Cluain Mhuire and University College, Galway.

== Author/Awards ==
He has published 18 books - >The Gift of Sleep (poems), >Third World Opera (poems), >Love in the Time of the Camera (essays), >Poems Selected and New (poems), >My Pledge of Love Cannot be Broken (essays), >Ah, Wilderness: A Journey through Sacred Time (essays), >If I Write You This Poem, Will You Make It Fly (poems), >To the Evening Star (poems), >Eighty-four Words for Sorrow (poems), >The Poet Learns to Dance (the Dancer Learns to Write a Poem) (poems), >Letter from Fatima (poem), >Partly Cloudy (poems), >Aimless Walk, Faithful River (poems), >Marawi and Other Poems (poems), >“Why Keanu Reeves is Lonely and Why the World Goes On As It Does” (poems), >“Mass at the Edge of Morning” (poem), >"Sonnets from Jerusalem" (poems), and >in collaboration with his wife, Ma. Milagros T. Dumdum, "The Sigh of a Hundred Leaves" (renga).

In 2001, he received the Gawad Pambansang Alagad ni Balagtas Award for Poetry in English from the Unyon ng mga Manunulat sa Pilipinas (UMPIL). He won second and third prizes in the Don Carlos Palanca Memorial Award for English poetry five times, and the Manila Critics Circle's National Book Award five times. Three of his books (Ah, Wilderness: A Journey through Sacred Time in 2010; If I Write You This Poem, Will You Make It Fly in 2012; and Aimless Walk, Faithful River back to back with The Poet Learns to Dance, the Dancer Learns to Write a Poemin 2018) were given by the National Book Development Association of the Philippines the Gintong Aklat (Golden Book) Award. In 2005, he received a medallion for writing the best decision in a criminal case, second level courts, in the Judicial Excellence Awards sponsored by the Supreme Court of the Philippines.
