= Lilia Quindoza Santiago =

Filipino writer and academic (1949–2021)

Lilia Quindoza Santiago (February 5, 1949 – February 15, 2021) was a writer and academic in the Philippines. She was named Makata ng Taon, "Poet of the Year," in 1989, and wrote the prize-winning novel Ang Kaulayaw ng Agila. Her academic work focused on languages of the Philippines as well as gender and sexuality studies, and her scholarly publications included the seminal 2002 anthology Sa Ngalan ng Ina (In the Name of the Mother): 100 Years of Philippine Feminist Poetry, 1889-1989.

== Early life and education ==
Lilia Quindoza was born in 1949 in Manaoag, in the Philippines' Pangasinan province. She grew up in Baguio, where she attended secondary school.

After graduating with a bachelor's degree in English from the University of the Philippines Diliman in 1971, she obtained a master's in comparative literature in 1980 and a Ph.D. in Philippine studies in 1990 from the same institution.

During Ferdinand Marcos' presidency, she became an anti-regime student activist. After martial law was imposed in 1972, she and fellow activists were arrested and tortured by the regime, and she was held for more than a year before being granted amnesty in August 1974. She later said that during her time imprisoned at Fort Bonifacio she found comfort in writing poetry and in storytelling.

== Career ==
Quindoza Santiago is considered one of the more prolific Filipino authors, writing over 20 books over the course of her long career as a poet, prose writer, and academic. She wrote in English, Filipino and Ilocano. Her published works notably include the poetry collections Kagampan (1989) and Asintada (1997), and the short story collection Ang Manggagamot ng Salay-Salay at Iba Pang Kuwento (1989). In 1989, she was named Makata ng Taon, "Poet of the Year," as part of the Talaang Ginto awards.

In addition to her poetry and short stories, she also wrote one novel, Ang Kaulayaw ng Agila. In 1999, the novel won the grand prize at that year's Palanca Awards, and it was published by University of the Philippines Press in 2002.

She also had a lengthy academic career, primarily focused on the Tagalog and Ilocano languages, as well as gender and sexuality, among other subjects. She published various research works and edited anthologies, including Filipina I: Poetry, Drama, Fiction (1984), Filipina II: An Anthology of Contemporary Women Writers in the Philippines (1985), Women Empowering Communication: A Resource Book on Women and the Globalization of Media (1994), Tales of Courage & Compassion: Stories of Women in the Philippine Revolution (1997), Sa Ngalan ng Ina (In the Name of the Mother): 100 Years of Philippine Feminist Poetry, 1889-1989 (2002), Sexuality and the Filipina (2007), and Filipino Poetry and Martial Law 1970-1987: Clenched Fists and Yellow Ribbons (2016). Sa Ngalan ng Ina is considered "the canonic book of Filipina women’s poetry," the first collection of that scale to be produced.

Quindoza Santiago taught for over three decades at the University of the Philippines. In 2005, she was sent to Virginia as a Fulbright scholar, where she was a visiting professor at Old Dominion University.

After retiring from the University of the Philippines, in 2007 she moved to the United States and spent nine years teaching Ilocano as an assistant professor at the University of Hawaiʻi at Mānoa. Beginning in 2018, she taught at Virginia's Tidewater Community College. She also served as a consultant for the University of Maryland's National Foreign Language Center.

== Personal life and death ==
Lilia Quindoza Santiago was married for 43 years to fellow activist and poet Jesús Manuel Santiago, with whom she had four children. She died in 2021, at the age of 72, in Virginia.
