= Fidel Rillo Jr. =

Filipino writer and book designer (born 1955)

Fidel Doloreto Rillo Jr. (born June 4, 1955) is a Filipino writer and book designer.

Born in Manila, Philippines, Rillo was a product of the Philippine public school system before pursuing a degree in agriculture at the Gregorio Araneta University Foundation, which he later abandoned for a writing career. He is a recipient of several awards from the Don Carlos Palanca Memorial Awards for Literature, Cultural Center of the Philippines and the Surian ng Wikang Pambansa (National Language Institute) for his poetry, fiction and essays, and the National Book Development Board (NBDB) for his book designs. In 2004, Rillo received the Gawad Balagtas (Balagtas Lifetime Achievement Award) from the Unyon ng mga Manunulat sa Pilipinas (UMPIL) or Writers Union of the Philippines (WUP) "for his poetry that exemplifies discipline, dignity and keenness of sense ... while exhibiting an admirably natural and daring approach to and exploration of the world of the Filipino."
