= Rene Villanueva =

Filipino writer (1954–2007)

Rene O. Villanueva (September 22, 1954 – December 5, 2007) was a Filipino playwright and author. He is famed for his deep involvement in theater and television and in children's literature, whether it be on television, in books or on stage.

== Awards ==
He won the following awards: Ten Outstanding Young Persons (TOYP), New York Film and TV Festival, First Latin American Video and Film Festival (Columbia), Japan Prize (Preschool Category), Prix Juenesse Winner (Germany), Ten Outstanding Young Men (TOYM), CCP, Gawad Collantes, Gantipalang Quezon, National Book Award, and Palanca.

His short play, Kumbersasyon (1980), won him the first of many Palanca Awards. His award-winning plays include May Isang Sundalo (1981, first prize), Huling Gabi sa Maragondon (1983, first prize), Punla ng Dekada (1984, second prize), Ang Hepe (1986, third prize), Asawa (1987, second prize), and Awit ng Adarna (1987, second prize).

== Biography ==
Rene O. Villanueva was born in the La Loma neighborhood of Quezon City in the Philippines to Francisco, Tesdaman, Eduardo and Vicenta Villanueva.

He graduated with a History degree in 1975 from the Lyceum of the Philippines University. He died on December 5, 2007, at the Philippine Heart Center due to sudden cardiac arrest. His last blog post on his personal blog is here

== Posthumous ==
The UPAlumni.net wrote on Villanueva: “…Villanueva, a playwright, was among the leading figures in children's literature in the Philippines. He was in the hall of fame list of the Don Carlos Palanca Memorial Awards for Literature. He graduated with a degree in history at the Lyceum of the Philippines in 1975.” Villanueva was awarded the Gawad CCP Para sa Sining (Literature) in 2004 and the Gawad Chanselor sa UP in 2005.

== Works ==
=== Full Length Plays ===
- Sixteen and Three Fourths (1975)
- Burles (Burlesque) (1977)
- Tribu (Tribe) (1979)
- Kontsabahan sa Tirarang (Conspiracy in Tirarang) (1979)
- Hiblang Abo (Strands of Gray) (1980)
- Sinakulo (1981)
- Sandaang Panaginip (A Hundred Dreams) (1981)
- Samperang Muta (Cheap Thrill) (1982)
- Madyik (Magic) (1983)
- Sigwa (Storm) (1984)
- Huling Istasyon (Last Station) (1983)
- Ang Hepe (The Chief) (1986)
- Awit ng Adarna (Song of the Adarna) (1987)
- Botong (1989)
- Tonyo (1990)
- Kalantiaw (1994)
- Bintao (1995)
- The Bomb! (2003)

=== One Act Plays ===
- Kumbersasyon (Conversation) (1980)
- May Isang Sundalo (There Is A Soldier) (1981)
- Nana (Mother) (1982)
- Huling Gabi sa Maragondon (Last Night at Maragondon) (1983)
- Punla ng Dekada (Seedlings of the Decade) (1984)
- Kaaway sa Sulod (Enemy Within) (1986) (with Rolando S. Dela Cruz)
- Mabuhay ang Pangulo (Long Live the President) (1987) (with Rolando S. Dela Cruz)
- Asawa (Spouse) (1987) (with Rolando S. Dela Cruz)
- Teodora (1993)
- Gregoria (1993)
- Dobol (Double) (1994)
- Watawat (Flag) (1999)
- White Love (2004)
- Bertdey ni Guido (Guido's Birthday) (2007)

=== Two-act Documentary Play ===
- Sa Sariling Bayan (In One’s Own Land) (1988)

=== Translations and Adaptations ===
- Florente at Laura (Florente and Laura) (1988)
- Ang Napigil-Sanang-Paghahari ni Arturo Ui (Bertolt Brecht's The Resistible Rise of Arturo Ui) (1987) (with Joey Baquiran)
- Sutsot sa Dilim (Whistle in the Dark) (1985)
- Crimes of Passion (1985)
- Awit ng Adarna (Song of Adarna) (1984)
- Sa Kuko ng Liwanag (In the Claws of Neon Light) (1993)
- "Isperekengkeng Isperekangkang" (A Comedy of Errors) (2005)

=== Children’s Plays ===
- Tiktipak-long (Grasshoppers) (1984)
- Si Pagong at si Matsing (The Turtle and the Monkey) (1984) (an opera with music by Lucrecia Kasilag)
- Ang Apoy ng mga Hayop (The Fire of the Animals) (1987) (music by Kasilag)
- Aguinaldo sa Niño (Gift for the Infant) (1987)
- Noong Unang Panahon (In the Beginning) (1988)

=== Screenplays ===
- Gabi na Kumander (It’s Night Commander) (1986)
- Kamagong (Mahagony) (1987)
- Anak ng Lupa (Child of the Earth) (1987)

=== Autobiography/Memoirs ===
- Personal: Mga Sanaysay Sa Lupalop Ng Gunita

=== Teleplays ===
- Gabay Sa Pagsulat At Anim Na Dulang Pantelebisyon
- Literature Eksena't Saknong (with Ligaya G. Tiamson Rubin)

=== Children's books ===
- Ang Pamilyang Ismid (The Family Ismid) co-published by Cacho Publishing House and Philippine Children’s Television Foundation
- Ang Patsotsay Na Iisa Ang Pakpak (The Patsotsay With Only One Wing) co-published by Cacho Publishing House and Philippine Children’s Television Foundation
- Ang Prinsipeng Ayaw Maligo (The Prince Who Hated Taking Baths) published by Cacho Publishing House.
- Ang Unang Baboy Sa Langit (The First Pig In Heaven) published by Cacho Publishing House. [1st Prize, Don Carlos Palanca Memorial Award for Literature, children's story, (Tagalog) 1990]
- Ayokong Pumasok Sa Paaralan (I Don't Want to Go to School) published by Cacho Publishing House.
- Dagat Sa Kama Ni Troy (The Sea in Troy's Bed) published by Cacho Publishing House.
- Gusto Kong Kumain Ng Pansit Ngayon (I Want to Eat Noodles Now) published by Cacho Publishing House.
- Kung Bakit Umuulan (Why It Rains) published by Cacho Publishing House.
- Nagsasabi Si Patpat (Patpat Says When) published by Cacho Publishing House.
- Nasaan Ang Tsinelas Ko? (Where Are My Slippers?) published by Cacho Publishing House.
- Okaka-okaka published by Cacho Publishing House.
- Sina Elephas At Estegodon Noon Unang Panahon (Elephas and Estegodon [Two Mammoths during Primeval Times]) published by Cacho Publishing House.
- Si Inggolok At Ang Planeta Pakaskas (Inggolok and the Planet Pakaskas) co-published by Cacho Publishing House and Philippine Children’s Television Foundation
- Si Paula Oink-oink published by Cacho Publishing House
- Sina Linggit Laban Kay Barakuda (Linggit against Barracuda [A retelling of a folktale]) co-published by Cacho Publishing House and Philippine Children’s Television Foundation
- Lumikha Ng Kuwento, Tula At Laruang Pambata (with Virgilio Almario, Annaleah Habulan, Michelle Parazo Manual)
- The Rene O. Villanueva Children's Reader (the author's own selection of his favorite stories, poems, plays and lyrics [English and Filipino]) published by Cacho Publishing House.

=== Song lyrics ===
- Batibot theme song (music by Louie Ocampo)

== Sources ==
- Tiongson, Nicanor G., ed. CCP Encyclopedia of Philippine Art; Volume VII: Philippine Theater. 1994

https://web.archive.org/web/20091022142301/http://geocities.com/palanca_awards/index.html The Don Carlos Palanca Memorial Awards for Literature] (Unofficial website). Retrieved August 27, 2005

- "Ode to a Mentor and a Friend" The Official Blog of Ian del Carmen (December 8, 2007)
