= Ruth Elynia Mabanglo =

Filipino-American academic

Ruth Elynia S. Mabanglo (born March 30, 1949) is a retired professor at the University of Hawaii at Manoa. She was the coordinator for the Filipino and Philippine Literature Program. Her most recent publications were "Balada ni Lola Amonita" and "The Ballad of Lola Amonita" in Babaylan: An Anthology of Filipina and Filipina American Writers, edited by Nick Carbó and Eileen Tabios and published by Aunt Lute Books in the year 2000.

Born in Manila to Fortunato and Miguela Mabanglo, she received a degree in Filipino from the University of the East, a Filipino language and literature master's degree from Philippine Normal College, and a doctorate in Filipino from Manuel L. Quezon University. Aside from teaching at University of the East, Manuel L. Quezon University, Philippine Normal College, and De La Salle University, she was a journalist with Taliba and Abante for a while.

== Awards and honors ==
Don Carlos Palanca Memorial Awards

- "Caloocan: Balada ng Duguang Tinig" (Special Prize, Tula, 1972)
- "Dalit-puri at Iba Pang Tula" (Third Prize, Tula, 1973)
- "Si Jesus at si Magdalena" (First Prize, Dulang May Isang Yugto, 1973)
- "Dalawampu't Isang Tula" (Third Prize, Tula, 1979)
- "Awiyao" (Third Prize, Dulang May Isang Yugto, 1980)
- "Mga Abong Pangarap" (First Prize, Dulang Ganap ang Haba, 1983)
- "Mga Puntod" (Third Prize, Dulang Ganap ang Haba, 1984)
- "Mga Liham ni Pinay at Iba Pang Tula" (First Prize, Tula, 1987)

CCP Literary Contest

- "Ang Pilipinisasyon ni Juan" (First Prize, Verse-Writing, 1974)
- "Supling" (First Prize, Verse-Writing, 1975)
- "Regla" (Honorable Mention, Verse-Writing, 1977)

Talaang Ginto, Surian ng Wikang Pambansa

- "Kalookan: Balada ng Duguang Tinig" (Honorable Mention, 1972)
- "Gabi ng Isang Kasal: Isang Kakintalan" (First Honorable Mention, 1974)
- "Anibersaryo: Tagpo at Alaala" (Honorable Mention, 1974)
- "Sa Abenida, Sanghapo't Sanggabi" (First Honorable Mention, 1977)
- "Ang Pag-ibig ay Di Kasal at Iba Pang Tula" (Second Prize, 1978)
- "Hindi Ako Nawawala'y Hinahanap Mo" (Honorable Mention, 1980)
- "Gahasa" (First Prize and Poet of the Year Award, 1992)

National Book Award for Poetry, Manila Critics Circle, 1990

- "Mga Liham ni Pinay"
