= 1966 Palanca Awards =

Philippine literary award

16th Palanca Awards

The 16th Don Carlos Palanca Memorial Awards for Literature was held to commemorate the memory of Don Carlos Palanca Sr. through an endeavor that would promote education and culture in the country.

== Winners ==
The 1966 winners, the fourteenth recipients of the awards, were divided into six categories, open only to English and Filipino [Tagalog] short story, poetry, and one-act play:

=== English division ===
==== Short story ====
- First Prize: Lilia Pablo Amansec, "Loverboy"
- Second Prize: Kerima Polotan Tuvera, "A Various Season"
- Third Prize: Fr. Rodolfo Villanueva, "A Gift of Tongues"

==== Poetry ====
- First Prize: Emmanuel Torres, "Angels and Fugitives"
- Second Prize: Valdemar Olaguer, "A Collection of Poems"
- Third Prize: Manuel Viray, "After this Exile"

==== One-act play ====
- First Prize: Jesus T. Peralta, "The Sign of the Sea Gulls"
- Second Prize: Wilfrido D. Nolledo, "Flores Para Los Muertos"
- Third Prize: Mar V. Puatu, "O Lamb ... Poor Lamb"

=== Filipino division ===
==== Maikling Kwento ====
- First Prize: Wilfredo Pa. Virtusio, "Bilanggo"
- Second Prize: Pedro S. Dandan, "Ang Anino ng Kanyang Ama"
- Third Prize: Jeremias Victor Lacanieta, "Ang Dalaw"

==== Tula ====
- First Prize: Cresenciano C. Marquez Jr., "Ebolusyon"
- Second Prize: Vict. Dela Cruz, "Logos"
- Third Prize: Rogelio Mangahas, "Tinig Mula sa Kung Saan"

==== Dulang May Isang Yugto ====
- First Prize: Bernardo Del Rosario Jr., "Itim ang Kulay ng Paruparo"
- Second Prize: Rogelio Sicat, "Mga Kaluluwang Naghahanap"
- Third Prize: Benjamin P. Pascual, "Anino ng Kahapon"
