= 1970 Palanca Awards =

Philippine literary award

20th Palanca Awards

The 20th Don Carlos Palanca Memorial Awards for Literature was held to commemorate the memory of Don Carlos Palanca Sr. through an endeavor that would promote education and culture in the country.

== Winners ==
The 1970 winners, the twentieth recipients of the awards, were divided into six categories, open only to English and Filipino [Tagalog] short story, poetry, and one-act play:

=== English division ===
==== Short story ====
- First Prize: Ines Taccad Cammayo, “People of Consequence”
- Second Prize: Emmanuel Lacaba, “Punch and Judas”
- Third Prize: Ninotchka Rosca, “The Southern Seas”

==== Poetry ====
- First Prize: Hilario Francia Jr., “Selected Poems”
- Second Prize: Alfredo O. Cuenca Jr., “Selected Poems”
- Third Prize: Elsa M. Coscolluela, “Becoming and Other Poems”

==== One-act play ====
- First Prize: Nestor S. Florentino II, “Run, David, Run”
- Second Prize: Elsa M. Coscolluela, “Burning”
- Third Prize: Elsa M. Coscolluela, “Blood Spoor”

=== Filipino division ===
==== Maikling Kwento ====
- First Prize: Ricardo Lee, “Servando Magdamag”
- Second Prize: Dominador Mirasol, “Ang Bangkay sa Dalampasigan ng mga Uwak”
- Third Prize: Domingo Landicho, “Dugo sa Kanyang Pagsilang”

==== Tula ====
- First Prize: Virgilio S. Almario, “Peregrinasyon”
- Second Prize: Ruben Vega, “Alay sa Lahi”
- Third Prize: Epifanio San Juan Jr., “Maliwalu”

==== Dulang May Isang Yugto ====
- First Prize: Wilfredo Pa. Virtusio, “Vida”
- Second Prize: Levy Balgos Dela Cruz, “Ang Uwak”
- Third Prize: Rogelio Sikat, “Saan Pupunta ang Paruparo”
