= 1974 Palanca Awards =

Philippine literary award

24th Palanca Awards

The 24th Don Carlos Palanca Memorial Awards for Literature was held to commemorate the memory of Don Carlos Palanca Sr. through an endeavor that would promote education and culture in the country.

LIST OF WINNERS

The 1974 winners were divided into six categories, open only to English and Filipino [Tagalog] short story, poetry, and one-act play:

== English Division ==
=== Short Story ===
- First Prize: Gregorio C. Brillantes, "The Cries of Children on an April Afternoon in the Year 1957"
- Second Prize: Estrella D. Alfon, "The White Dress"
- Third Prize: Luning B. Ira, "Tell Me Who Cleft the Devil's Foot"
- Honorable Mention: Joy T. Dayrit, "Scoring"

=== Poetry ===
- First Prize: Artemio Tadena, "Identities"

Ophelia Dimalanta, "Montage"

- Second Prize: Ricardo de Ungria, "Boxes"

Gilbert Luis Centina III, "Glass of Liquid Truths"

- Third Prize: Jose Carreon, "A Liege of Datus and Other Poems"

Celestino M. Vega, "Rituals and Metaphor"

=== One-Act Play ===
- First Prize: No Winner
- Second Prize: Juan H. Alegre, "Aftercafe"
- Third Prize: Wilfrido D. Nolledo, "Dulce Estranjera"

== Filipino Division ==
=== Maikling Kwento ===
- First Prize: No Winner
- Second Prize: Rosauro Dela Cruz, "Isang Dakot na Pira-pirasong Buhay"
- Third Prize: Benigno R. Juan, "Malikmata"
- Special Award: Reynaldo A. Duque, "Ang Landas Patungo sa Kalimugtong"
- Honorable Mention: Efren Reyes Abueg, "Ang Buhay sa Ating Panahon"

Victor Fernandez, "Ulupong"

=== Tula ===
- First Prize: Charles Bryan Acosta, "si elsa sa basang sapa"
- Second Prize: Teo T. Antonio, "Litanya kay Sta. Clara at Iba pang Tula"
- Third Prize: Eduardo Garrovillas, "Ang Metapisika ng Tao"
- Special Award: Cresenciano C. Marquez Jr., "At Bumagtas ang Dilim"

Ruben Vega, "Iluminasyon at Iba Pang Tula"
Celso Daluz, "Quo Vadis, Kapitan at Iba Pang Tula"
Pedro S. Dandan, "Tinig Sa Bagong Panahon"
Bienvenido Ramos, "Tipanan sa Puso ng Kasaysayan"

=== Dulang May Isang Yugto ===
- First Prize: No Winner
- Second Prize: No Winner
- Third Prize: Tony Perez, "P. Paulino Frito, S.J."
- Honorable Mention: Frank G. Rivera, "Ama"

Nonilon Queano, "Basurahan"
Nervido Rivera, "Daigdig ng mga Pangarap"

== Sources ==
- "The Don Carlos Palanca Memorial Awards for Literature | Winners 1974". Archived from the original on 2009-10-22.
