= 1965 Palanca Awards =

Philippine literary award

15th Palanca Awards

The 15th Don Carlos Palanca Memorial Awards for Literature was held to commemorate the memory of Don Carlos Palanca Sr. through an endeavor that would promote education and culture in the country.

== Winners ==
The 1965 winners, the fifteenth recipients of the awards, were divided into six categories, open only to English and Filipino [Tagalog] short story, poetry, and one-act play:

=== English division ===
==== Short story ====
- First Prize: Nick Joaquin, "Doña Jeronima"
- Second Prize: Bienvenido N. Santos, "The Enchanted Plant"
- Third Prize: Almatita Tayo, "Naked Song"

==== Poetry ====
- First Prize: Epifanio San Juan Jr., "Godkissing Carrion"
- Second Prize: Emmanuel Torres, "A Group of Poems"
- Third Prize: Valdemar Olaguer, "A Group of Poems"

==== One-act play ====
- First Prize: Nestor Torre Jr., "No Sadder Race"
- Second Prize: Jesus T. Peralta, "The Mouth is an Open Wound"
- Third Prize: Mar V. Puatu, "Lust is a Four-letter Word"

=== Filipino Division ===
==== Maikling Kwento ====
- First Prize: Benjamin P. Pascual, "Landas sa Bahaghari"
- Second Prize: Eli Ang Barroso, "Kamatayan sa Dilim at Ulan"
- Third Prize: Bayani De Leon, "Mga Luha ni Leila"

==== Tula ====
- First Prize: Ruben Vega, "Sa Pagkaparool"
- Second Prize: Teo S. Baylen, "Mga Sugat ng Siglo"
- Third Prize: Gonzalo Flores, "Makiling"

==== Dulang May Isang Yugto ====
- First Prize: Edgardo M. Reyes, "Mga Yagit"
- Second Prize: Pablo M. Cuasay, "Maskara"
- Third Prize: Agapito M. Joaquin, "Ang Taksil"
