= 1963 Palanca Awards =

Philippine literary award

13th Palanca Awards

The 13th Don Carlos Palanca Memorial Awards for Literature was held to commemorate the memory of Don Carlos Palanca Sr. through an endeavor that would promote education and culture in the country.

== Winners ==
The 1963 winners, the thirteenth recipients of the awards, were divided into four categories, open only to English and Filipino [Tagalog] short story and one-act play:

=== Short Story ===
- First Prize: Juan Gatbunton, "A Record of My Passage"
- Second Prize: Leopoldo N. Cacnio, "The Taste of Dust"
- Third Prize: Alma De Jesus, "Mabuhay, My Country, My Lovely People"

=== One-Act Play ===
- First Prize: Wilfrido D. Nolledo, "Turn Red the Sea"
- Second Prize: Estrella D. Alfon, "Tubig"
- Third Prize: Julian E. Dacanay Jr., "The Executives"

=== Maikling Kwento ===
- First Prize: Buenaventura S. Medina Jr., "Himaymay"
- Second Prize: Rogelio Sicat, "Tata Selo"
- Third Prize: Efren Reyes Abueg, "Sa Bagong Paraiso"

=== Dulang May Isang Yugto ===
- First Prize: Benjamin P. Pascual, "Huling Kahilingan"
- Second Prize: Gregorio A. Moral Jr., "Nakalipad ang Ibon"
- Third Prize: Mar V. Puatu, "Mukha ni Medusa"
