= Severino Montano =

Filipino writer (1915–1980)

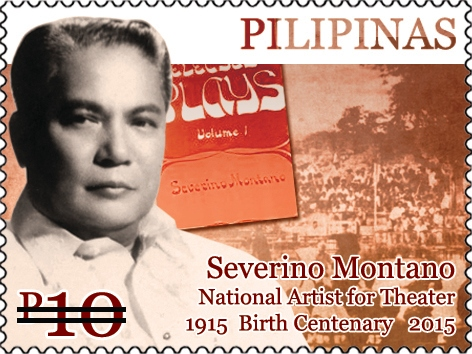
Severino Montano on a 2015 stamp of the Philippines

Severino Montano (January 3, 1915 – December 12, 1980) was a playwright, director, actor and theater organizer with an output of one novel, 150 poems and 50 plays in his 65-year lifetime. Through the foundation of the Arena Theater, Montano institutionalized “legitimate theater” in the Philippines. Considered one of the Titans of Philippine Theater, he was bestowed the award as National Artist of the Philippines in 2001.

== Life and career ==
Montano was born in Laoag, Ilocos Norte. Academically, he started his tutelage under a British mentor, Marie Leslie Prising, when he was thirteen. He studied at the University of the Philippines. She took Montano under her wing and endowed him with Western literature, the theater and Shakespeare. He was part of the UP Stage when he studied at the University of the Philippines. Then a scholarship took him to the famous "English 47" or "Workshop 47" playwriting workshops of George Pierce Baker at Yale University and guided by Broadway names and international personalities like Komisarjevsky of the famous Moscow Art Theater. He was conferred a Master of Fine Arts degree in playwriting and production by Yale University.

In 1946, he went to London to become a student of economist Harold Laski of the London School of Economics. Not long after, he was offered a teaching job at the American University in Washington, D.C. There, he finished his M.A. in Economic and Ph.D. in management and public administration, at the same time leading a playwriting-drama program as professor, playwright and play director. In 1950, 1952, 1962 and 1963, The Rockefeller Foundation extended him a world travel grant to visit cultural and art centers in 98 cities in Europe, the Middle East, South Asia, India, China and Japan.

When he returned to the Philippines, he already had 16 major plays to his credit. He was dean of instruction of the Philippine Normal College and organized the Arena Theater at the college in 1953 to "bring drama to the masses". He used his own money, about a thousand pesos, to start the Arena Theater, a theater-in-the-round. Due to the PNC being unable to fund the theater, Montano volunteered his services “to plan for a self-financing national drama program that would serve the grass-roots, the barrios of the Philippines”.

In 1953, the theater opened with three one-act plays and broke all records of all performances in Philippine theater history. The roving troupe took theater to near and far-flung barrios in 47 provinces across the country. Four of his plays became tour staples: the full-length The Love of Leonor Rivera and three one-act plays, Parting at Calamba, The Ladies and the Senador and Sabina. The Arena Theater also began a graduate program for the training of playwrights, directors, technicians, actors and designers. The program was also extended to include a four-year undergraduate curriculum.

Montano established the graduate program at the Philippine College. He trained and directed dramatists, including Rolando S. Tinio, Emmanuel Borlaza, Joonee Gamboa and Behn Cervantes. He also established the Arena Theater Playwriting Contest, which led to the discovery of Wilfrido Nolledo, Jesus T. Peralta and Estrella Alfon.

His awards include the Kalinangan Award from the city of Manila (1968), the Presidential Award for Merit in Drama and Theater (1961), the Citizen's Committee for Mass Media Award (1967 and 1968), the Pamulinawen Award (1981), and the National Artist Award (2001). The last two awards were given posthumously.

His published works include The Love of Leonor Rivera (poetic tragedy in two-parts), My Morning Star (poetic historical tragedy in three-parts), But Not My Sons Any Longer (poetic tragedy in two-parts), Gabriela Silang (poetic historical tragedy in three-parts), The Merry Wives of Manila (comedy of manners in three-parts), Sabina (tragedy), The Ladies and the Senador (satirical comedy) and Parting at Calamba (historical drama).

He died on December 12, 1980, at the age of 65.
