= List of Polytechnic University of the Philippines people =

List of notable personalities from PUP

This is a list of notable students, professors, and alumni of the Polytechnic University of the Philippines. The following people were distinguished in various fields such as public service, religion, literary arts, commerce, medicine, among others. The list includes people who have studied at various levels in PUP, from high school up to postgraduate school.

== Prominent alumni ==
=== Science, technology, medicine, and mathematics ===
| Name | Class year | Notability | Reference(s) |
|---|---|---|---|
| Perlita A. Nuevo | | Agriculturist | |
| Gian Scottie Javelona | | Software engineer and CEO, OrangeApps. A millionaire at the age of 24, he was listed on the Forbes "30 Under 30" List. | |

=== Business ===
| Name | Class year | Notability | Reference(s) |
|---|---|---|---|
| Aide B. De Guzman | | Senior Vice President, Puregold Price Club, Inc. | |
| Aileen L. Saringan | | Assurance Partner of SGV & Co., Member of the Philippine Institute of Certified Public Accountants | |
| Benjamin R. Punongbayan | | Certified public accountant, founder of Punongbayan and Araullo | |
| Christina Castillo | | Businesswoman; President of CBC Group of Companies | |
| Fernando L. Martinez | | Chairman and CEO, Eastern Petroleum Corporation | |
| Francisco C. Canuto | | Senior Vice President and Treasurer, Megaworld Corporation | |
| Joey Bermudez | | Former President of the Philippine Veterans Bank | |
| Henry M. Tan | | President of the PICPA Eastern Metro Manila Chapter, SGV’s Country Leader for Global Compliance Reporting and Business Tax Compliance, Transaction Tax Accredited Partner and Partner-in-Charge for Tax Basis Seminars | |
| Lloyd Abria Luna | | Motivational speaker, author, television host and entrepreneur | |
| Noel S. Gonzales | | Group Chairman and Chief Executive, Corporate Holdings Management Incorporated | |
| Olive Ramos | | Chief Executive Officer, South East Asian Airlines (SEAir) (now called Tigerair Philippines) | |
| Oscar T. Garcia | | Chairman, Anchor International Manpower | |
| Doris Espiritu | | Professor of Chemistry, Director of Engineering Pathways at Wilbur Wright City Colleges of Chicago | |
| Rolino C. Bucao, Jr. | | Vice President of Banco de Oro | |

=== Politics, law, and government ===
| Name | Class year | Notability | Reference(s) |
|---|---|---|---|
| Celia Yangco | | Secretary of Social Welfare and Development | |
| Saturnino Cunanan Ocampo | | Bayan Muna party-list representative, journalist and writer | |
| Antonieta Fortuna-Ibe | | Former Chairperson of the Professional Regulation Commission, Securities and Exchange Commission Commissioner | |
| Lord Arnel L. Ruanto | | Vice Mayor, Infanta, Quezon | |
| Diosdado N. Silva | 1975 | Assistant General Manager of the Philippine National Railways and lawyer; served as Executive Assistant to the Administrator of the Light Rail Transit Authority from 2010-2012 | |
| Rowena Niña O. Taduran | | Undersecretary for Legislative and Liaison Affairs of Department of Social Welfare and Development | |
| Eli San Fernando | 2018 | Kamanggagawa Partylist Representative of the House of Representatives | |

=== News ===
| Name | Class year | Notability | Reference(s) |
|---|---|---|---|
| Aljo Bendijo | | Broadcast journalist and news anchor | |
| Bella "Love" Añover | 1997 | Broadcast journalist and media, celebrity, and comedian | |
| Gerard Garcia | | Reporter, TV5 | |
| Irene Fernando | | Journalist, Manila Bulletin | |
| Jaime A. FlorCruz | | Journalist, Beijing Bureau Chief, CNN | |
| John “Papa Jackson” Gemperle | 2003 | Instructor; radio host, 106.7 Energy FM | |
| Maricel Halili | | News anchor of IBC | |
| Steve Dailisan | | Broadcast journalist and news anchor | |
| Mario Teodoro Failon Etong | | Professor; broadcast journalist and a former politician | |
| Zhander Cayabyab | | Radyo Patrol Reporter 49 Sports news reporter and researcher, DZMM | |
| Marianne Enriquez | 2011 | TV5 News Reporter | |

=== Literature ===
| Name | Class year | Notability | Reference(s) |
|---|---|---|---|
| Rogelio Ordoñez | | Professor; writer | |

=== Film, theater, and television ===
| Name | Class year | Notability | Reference(s) |
|---|---|---|---|
| Arvin "Tado" Jimenez (1974 –2014) | | Celebrity, businessman, activist | |
| Bayani Rogacion, Jr. | | Actor, singer, comedian and TV host | |
| Albert Sumaya Jr. | | Celebrity, comedian, journalist | |
| Denille Lou Valmonte | | Model, Bb. Pilipinas 2006 | |
| Lemberto "Bert" De Leon | | Director | |
| Liezel Garcia | | Singer, artist | |
| James Ronald and Rodfil Obeso | | Internet celebrities, comedians | |
| Nash Ang | | Director, won the Gold Prize for Digital Media Arts at the ASEAN-Korea Multimedia Competition and Exhibition | |
| Joy Barcoma | | Host, Miss Philippines Earth 2025 | |

=== Music ===
| Name | Class year | Notability | Reference(s) |
|---|---|---|---|
| Jonathan Manalo | | Singer-songwriter, record producer | |
| Raul Marco Sison | | Composer, singer-songwriter | |

=== Art, architecture, and engineering ===
| Name | Class year | Notability | Reference(s) |
|---|---|---|---|
| Carlo Pagulayan | | Artist | |
| Royal Pineda | | Architect, managing partner at Budji Layug + Royal Pineda Design Architects | |

=== Religion ===
| Name | Class year | Notability | Reference(s) |
|---|---|---|---|
| Eduardo Cruz Villanueva | | Professor; founder and senior bishop of Jesus Is Lord Church; formerly a 2004 and 2010 presidential candidate | |

=== Academics ===
==== College founders and presidents ====
| Name | Class year | Notability | Reference(s) |
|---|---|---|---|
| Francisco Dalupan, Sr. | | Founder and first Chairperson of the University of the East | |
| Fr. Herminio Dagohoy | | Rector Magnificus of the University of Santo Tomas | |

==== Professors and scholars ====
| Name | Class year | Notability | Reference(s) |
|---|---|---|---|
| Galcoso C. Alburo | | Concepcion Integrated School professor, One of the Ten Metrobank Foundation’s Outstanding Teachers for 2012 | |
| Perlita A. Nuevo | | University of the Philippines Los Baños professor, DOST-PCARRD agriculturist | |

== Faculty ==
Professors who are also PUP alumni are listed in italics.

| Name | Class year | Notability | Reference(s) |
|---|---|---|---|
| Ave Perez Jacob | Professor | Writer, columnist, literary critic and novelist popular for his socio-political works | |
| Blas Ople | Professor | Journalist and politician who served as 21st Senate President and as Secretary of Foreign Affairs. | |
| Dante Tiñga | Professor (2001-2003) | Dean, College of Law (2001-2003); Associate Justice of the Supreme Court of the Philippines | |
| Efren Abueg | Professor (1971-1972) | Award-winning writer | |
| Joseph Mercado | Professor (2000-2018) | Statistician and former vice president of the university (2012-2018) | |
| Nemesio Prudente | Professor | President of the Polytechnic University of the Philippines (1962-1972;1986); political activist who fought for reforms and revitalizing public education in the Philippines by institutionalizing much-needed changes in the state university | |
| Rustica C. Carpio | Professor | Professor Emeritus and Consultant in Culture and the Arts, PUP, Executive Director of the President's Committee on Culture at FEU, PMPC Star Awards for Movie: Nora Aunor Ulirang Artista Lifetime Achievement Awardee | |
| Manuel Muhi | Professor (1996-2004) | President of the Polytechnic University of the Philippines 2020 - Present, Former professor and Dean in Polytechnic University of the Philippines College of Engineering. | |

== Note ==
1. People who attended PUP, but did not graduate or have yet to graduate.
2. An alumnus of PUP that also serves as faculty.
