= 1964 Palanca Awards =

Philippine literary award

14th Palanca Awards

The 14th Don Carlos Palanca Memorial Awards for Literature was held to commemorate the memory of Don Carlos Palanca Sr. through an endeavor that would promote education and culture in the country. This year saw the inclusion of a new category, Poetry/Tula, for both the English and Filipino Divisions.

== Winners ==
The 1964 winners, the fourteenth recipients of the awards, were divided into six categories, open only to English and Filipino [Tagalog] short story, poetry, and one-act play:

=== English division ===
==== Short story ====
- First Prize: Gilda Cordero Fernando, "A Wilderness of Sweets"
- Second Prize: Lilia Pablo Amansec, "The Dream Tiger"
- Third Prize: Julian E. Dacanay Jr., "Mud Under the Sea"

==== Poetry ====
- First Prize: Carlos Angeles, "A Stun of Jewels"
- Second Prize: Emmanuel Torres, "Becoming Dark, Sunflower by Van Gogh, Out of the Parrot Cage..."
- Third Prize: Rita Baltazar Gaddi, "The Lady of October and Image of the Dancer"

==== One-act play ====
- First Prize: Rolando S. Tinio, "It's April, What are We Doing Here"
- Second Prize: Wilfrido D. Nolledo, "Rise, Terraces"
- Third Prize: Nestor Torre Jr., "Out of Darkness"

=== Filipino division ===
==== Maikling Kwento ====
- First Prize: Dominador Mirasol, "Mga Aso sa Lagarian"
- Second Prize: Edgardo M. Reyes, "Si Ama"
- Third Prize: Efren R. Abueg, "Dugo sa Ulo ni Corbo"

==== Tula ====
- First Prize: Fernando Monleon, "Alamat ng Pasig"
- Second Prize: Bienvenido Ramos, "Ito ang Ating Panahon"
- Third Prize: Vedasto Suarez, "A Group of Poems Published in Halimuyak 101"

==== Dulang May Isang Yugto ====
- First Prize: Dioisio S. Salarzan, "Sinag sa Karimlan"
- Second Prize: Orlando C. Rodriguez, "Babasagang Alon"
- Third Prize: Benjamin P. Pascual, "Kintin"
