= 1956 Palanca Awards =

Philippine literary award

6th Palanca Palanca Awards

The 6th Carlos Palanca Memorial Awards for Literature was held to commemorate the memory of Carlos T. Palanca Sr. through an endeavor that would promote education and culture in the country.

== English Division ==
=== Short Story ===
- First Prize: Kerima Polotan Tuvera, "The Trap"
- Second Prize: Bienvenido N. Santos, "The Transfer"
- Third Prize: S.V. Epistola, "The Lost Ones"

=== One-Act Play ===
- First Prize: Marcelino Agana Jr., "New Yorker in Tondo"
- Second Prize: Wilfrido D. Nolledo, "Island of the Heart"
- Third Prize: Isabel Taylor Escoda, "The Strike"

== Filipino Division ==
=== Maikling Kwento ===
- First Prize: No Winner
- Second Prize: Martin Del Rosario, "Lupa, Ulan at Supling"
- Third Prize: Pedrito Salazar, "Mga Butil, Mga Busal"

=== Dulang May Isang Yugto ===
- First Prize: Ruben Vega, "Karalitaan"
- Second Prize: Gregorio De Vega, "Bakas ng Kahapon"
- Third Prize: Deogracias Tigno Jr., "Kidnapped"

== Sources ==
- "The Don Carlos Palanca Memorial Awards for Literature | Winners 1956". Archived from the original on 2009-10-22.
