= 1960 Palanca Awards =

Philippine literary award

10th Palanca Memorial Awards

The 10th Carlos Palanca Memorial Awards for Literature was held to commemorate the memory of Carlos T. Palanca, Sr. through an endeavor that would promote education and culture in the country.

LIST OF WINNERS

The 1960 winners, the tenth recipients of the awards, were divided into four categories, open only to English and Filipino [Tagalog] short story and one-act play:

== English Division ==
=== Short Story ===
- First Prize: Kerima Polotan Tuvera, "The Tourists"
- Second Prize: Gregorio Brillantes, "Faith, Love, Time and Dr. Lazaro"
- Third Prize: Wilfrido D. Nolledo, "In Caress of Beloved Faces"

=== One-Act Play ===
- First Prize: No Winner
- Second Prize: Adrian Cristobal, "The Largest Crocodile in the World"
- Third Prize: Estrella D. Alfon, "Forever Witches"

== Filipino Division ==
=== Maikling Kwento ===
- First Prize: Eduardo B. Reyes, "Luntiang Bukid"
- Second Prize: Andres Cristobal Cruz, "Kinagisnang Balon"
- Third Prize: Edgardo M. Reyes, "Di Maabot ng Kawalang Malay"

=== Dulang May Isang Yugto ===
- First Prize: Rolando Bartolome, "Kamatayan ng mga Simulain"
- Second Prize: Amado V. Hernandez, "Ang mga Kagalang-galang"
- Third Prize: Clodualdo Del Mundo, "Mr. Congressman"

== Sources ==
- "The Don Carlos Palanca Memorial Awards for Literature | Winners 1960". Archived from the original on 2009-10-22.
