= Rogelio Ordoñez =

Filipino fiction writer, poet, activist, journalist and educator

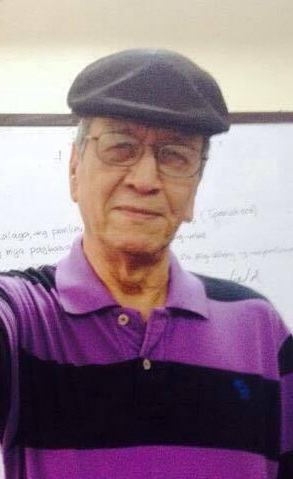
- Born: Rogelio Lunasco Ordoñez; September 24, 1940; Alapan, Imus, Cavite, Philippine Commonwealth
- Died: May 19, 2016 (aged 75); Imus, Cavite, Philippines
- Education: BS Civil Engineering, Mapua Institute of Technology; MA Mass Communication, Polytechnic University of the Philippines
- Occupations: Educator, Journalist, Lecturer
- Writing career
- Period: 1960–2015
- Genre: Sociocultural Background of the Philippines
- Subjects: Social Issues and Land Reform
- Notable work: Mga Agos sa Disyerto (Co-author)
- Website: plumaatpapel.wordpress.com

Rogelio Lunasco Ordoñez (born September 24, 1940 - May 19, 2016) also known as Ka Roger, was a multi-awarded Filipino fiction writer, poet, activist, journalist and educator. He was one of the authors of the iconic Tagalog literature anthology Mga Agos sa Disyerto in the 1960s. He was a contributor to Liwayway Magazine, Pilipino Free Press, Asia-Philippines Leader, Pilosopong Tasyo, Diario Uno and Pinoy Weekly.

== Biography ==
=== Early life and education ===
Ordoñez was born in Alapan, Imus, Cavite. He studied at Mapua Institute of Technology and Manuel L. Quezon University and obtained a Bachelor of Science in Civil Engineering. Drawn to the Filipino literature that focused on the reality of life, especially about the workers and peasants and the downtrodden or the oppressed, Ordoñez concentrated in writing instead of practicing his degree. He wrote many fictions, most notably short stories in Liwayway, columns and editorials in Pilipino Free Press as a staff member, various articles in Asia-Philippines Leader also as a staff member, and poems, short-stories and essays in literary journals. His first short story appeared in Liwayway when he was still in high school. Keen in teaching and molding new-generation writers, he took up his MA in Mass Communication at the Polytechnic University of the Philippines.

=== Career ===
Ordoñez worked under Nick Joaquin in the Asia-Philippines Leader for a short period of time. He was the former editor-in-chief and former chairman of the editorial board of the alternative newspaper Pinoy Weekly, a nationalist and progressive newspaper in Filipino. Ordoñez has worked as secretary-general of the PUP's Center for Creative Writing, professorial lecturer, and columnist. Sometime in 1995, he served as the director of Institute of Labor and Industrial Relations in Polytechnic University of the Philippines and was a professor in the graduate school of the same institution; he also taught creative writing, literature, history, works of Rizal, contemporary social problems and Pamamahayag sa Filipinolohiya in the undergraduate programs, also in the said university.

== Works ==
Writing fiction, articles and literary criticisms in Filipino, Ordoñez works were anthologized in the following: Readings in Contemporary Bilingual Literature (Ateneo de Manila University), Parnasong Tagalog of Alejandro G. Abadilla (selected poems in Filipino), Hiyas (Vols. 2 & 3, textbooks in Public High Schools), Bantayog (selected essays in Filipino, Philippine Normal University), Nationalist Literature and Likhaan (University of the Philippines), Subverso (ACT), Kilates (UP) and the landmark Mga Agos sa Disyerto (1964). His novels include Apoy sa Madaling Araw (1964), co-authored with Dominador B. Mirasol, and Limang Suwail (1963), co-authored with Efren Abueg, Rogelio Sicat, Edgardo M. Reyes and Eduardo Bautista Reyes. In 1998. the University of the Philippines published in book form some of his selected writings Saan Papunta ang mga Putok?. In 1997, his short-story, Si Anto, was translated to English and anthologized in Stories From Southeast Asia (Malaysia) and considered as one of the best short-stories in Southeast Asia for the past 30 years, according to Muhammad Haji Salleh, editor of the said anthology. In 2004, the Polytechnic University of the Philippines published in book form his columns Pluma at Papel from Diario Uno and in 2007, Prometheus Publishing Corp. also published his columns and editorials Pluma at Papel (Sa Panahon ni Gloria) from Pinoy Weekly. Some of his poems were also anthologized in Ipuipo sa Piging (2010), selected poems of some 32 poets in Filipino. Last March 15, 2011, his collection of poems, HIJO Y HIJA DE PUTA at iba pang mga tula was launched by Grandwater Publishing at the Polytechnic University of the Philippines. In November 2013, one of his poems, the Alay sa Bayaning Mandirigma was anthologized in Salita ng Sandata (Bonifacio's Legacies to the People's Struggle); his poem Maita (Ka Dolor) Gomez was also anthologized in Maita (Remembering Ka Dolor). Last October, 2014, the Center for Creative Writing of the Polytechnic University of the Philippines launched his new anthology of poems Sa Pamumulaklak ng mga Talahib, with English version (The Talahib's Blooming). Two of his poems, the To The Writers and Will Search for You Always were anthologized in Feelings International Book of Poetry, 2nd Edition, a collection of poems by poets from Asia, Africa, Europe and USA edited by a respected literati Dr. Armeli Quezon of Charleston, SC, USA.

=== Published works ===
- Mga Agos sa Disyerto (Co-author)
- Saan Papunta ang mga Putok?
- Hijo y Hija de Puta
- Pluma at Papel sa Panahon ni Gloria
- Ipuipo sa Piging
- Pluma at Papel [sa Panahon ni Erap]
- Sa Pamumukadkad ng mga Talahib

== Affiliations ==
In the course of his writing career that has spanned five decades, he became a member and former head of the Cavite Press Club, Philippine Writers Academy, Pambansang Unyon ng Manunulat (PANULAT), and the Pambansang Linangan at Ugnayan ng mga Manunulat (PLUMA). He was one of the founders of PAKSA (Panulat Para Sa Kaunlaran Ng Sambayanan) in 1971 and its spokesperson before the declaration of Martial Law by the former president Ferdinand E. Marcos.

== Awards ==
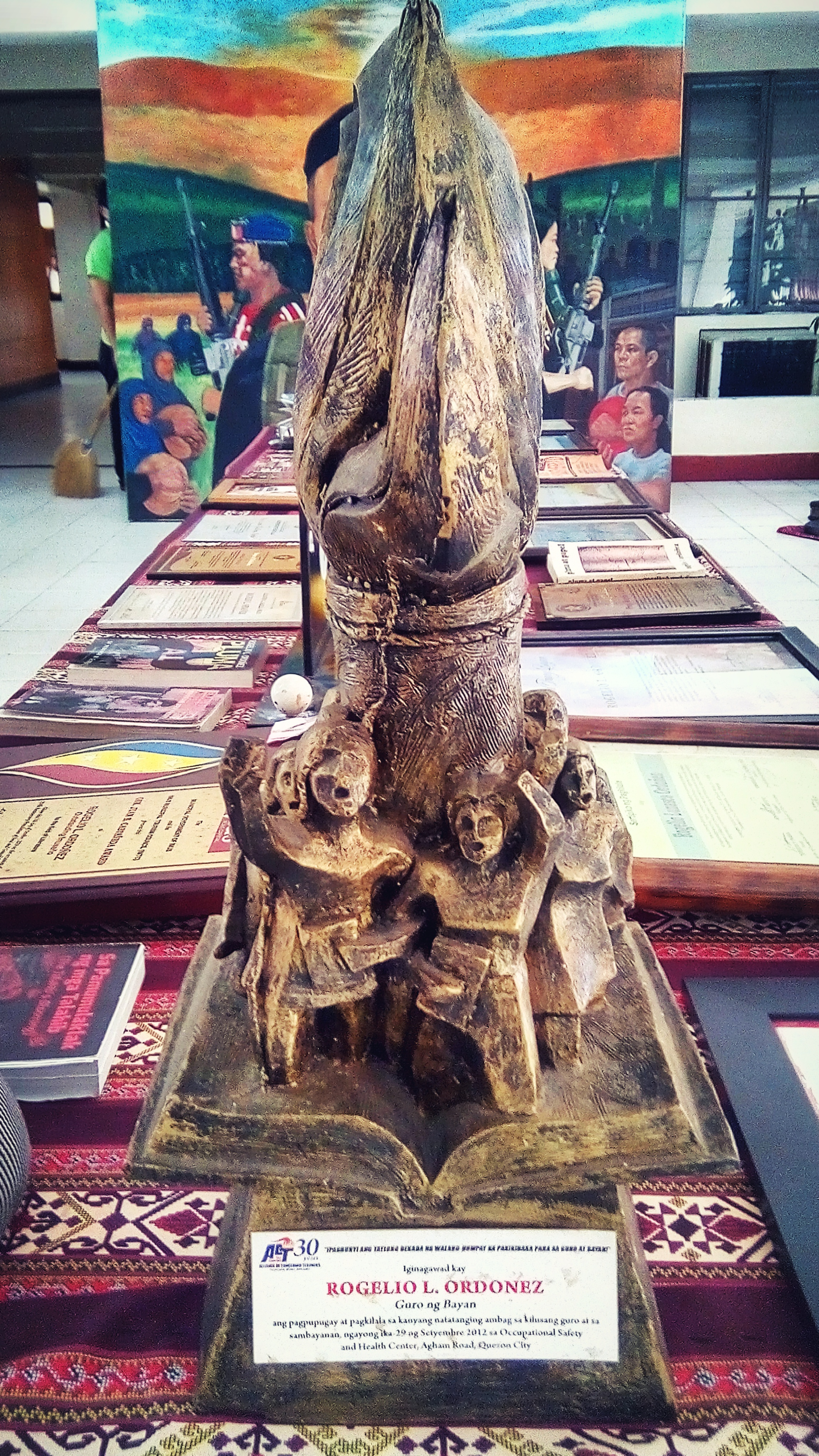
One of the Awards received by Rogelio Ordoñez displayed during Tungkulin ng Manunulat, Isang Eksibit alay kay Regelio Ordoñez exhibit on August 22–31, 2016 in PUP.

Ordoñez has garnered top prizes from Liwayway itself (novel writing), the José Rizal Centennial Commission in 1961 (essay), the Gawad Kadipan for "Dugo ni Juan Lazaro”, first prize in 1962 (an inter-university association of Tagalog writers and instructors), the Balagtas Memorial Awards for Journalism (held in honor of the poet-hero Francisco Balagtas). He was bestowed by the Writers' Union of the Philippines (UMPIL) the Gawad Pambansang Alagad ni Balagtas (National Achievement Award for Literature) and a Certificate of Recognition from PUP during its founding anniversary in 2001 for his story, Si Anto which appeared in Tenggara Southeast Asian Journal. He was also honored, in 2009, by his province of Cavite for being a Progressive Caviteño in the field of Literature. On the 234th founding anniversary of the town of Imus, Cavite (Oct. 7, 2009), he was bestowed the distinction as an outstanding Imuseño also in the field of Literature. and the Gawad Alejandro G. Abadilla for being a "creative writer and militant journalist." Last June 25, 2011, he was bestowed by the KM64 Poetry Collective the title Makata ng Bayan (People's Poet) for his poetry that clearly depicts the aspirations of the Filipino masses to free themselves from the clutches of injustices and exploitation perpetuated against them by the continuing tyranny and oppression of a few demigods or members of the ruling class in Philippine society. In the yearly celebration of POESIA (Aug. 8, 2011) by the De La Salle University (Dasmarinas), he was honored for his contributions in the field of poetry and literature as vehicle of social consciousness and effective instruments towards a more free and equal society. The Polytechnic University of the Philippines, on its 107th Founding Anniversary last Sept. 30, 2011, awarded him the Plaque of Distinction as "an outstanding and well-known writer who has consistently brought honor to the University through his prolific writings as a novelist and poet, thereby distinguishing himself as a major contributor to the enrichment of Philippine Literature." On Sept. 29, 2012, during the 30th anniversary-celebration of ACT (Alliance of Concerned Teachers), a progressive organization continuously fighting for the welfare of Filipino teachers, he was conferred the title Guro ng Bayan (People's Teacher). He was also honored by CONTEND (Congress of Teachers and Educators for Nationalism and Democracy-UP) in a ceremony held at the Masscom Auditorium of the University of the Philippines last September 27, 2013 as one of the country's nationalist teachers (Makabayang Guro).

In 2016, during the celebration of Buwan ng Wikang Pambansa, the PUP's College of Arts and Letters through its Departamento ng Filipinolohiya organized the first "Unang Gawad Rogelio Ordoñez" a series of activities dedicated to late Ordoñez. Activities includes Lapat-awit, sabayang pagbigkas (Sa Bayan ni Juan poem were used as piece) and together with PUP's Center for Creative Writing come with Pagsulat ng Maikling Kwento, Sanaysay and Tula. In honor of the late Ordoñez who's a long time professor in the university, Polytechnic University of the Philippines' College of Arts and Letters together with its Center for Creative Writing organized Tungkulin ng Manunulat, Isang Eksibit alay kay Regelio Ordoñez, an exhibit of Ordoñez's works and awards which runs from August 22–31, 2016.

== Death ==
"Marami na siyang bagay na nasaksihan, marami na siyang nasulat. Hindi maramot si Ka Roger. Dahil sa kanya ay mayroon kaming mga alaala ng mga bagay na hindi naman namin naranasan."

— The PUP Center for Creative Writing.

Ordoñez had been battling with a lingering liver ailment. During his last days, Ordoñez insisted not taking his medicines and would not go to any hospital. He even created his might be last piece poem entitled Sa mga biktima ng masaker sa Mendiola, mga pagpatay sa Hacienda Luisita at, ngayon naman, sa Kidapawan.

On May 19, 2016, Ordoñez died of liver cancer at the age 75. His remains was cremated at the Holy Trinity Chapel and Crematorium in Sucat, Parañaque City on May 24.

== See also ==
- Lualhati Bautista
- Manuel Buising
- Edgardo M. Reyes
- Rogelio Sicat
- Ave Perez Jacob
