= 1962 Palanca Awards =

Philippine literary award

12th Palanca Memorial Awards

The 12th Carlos Palanca Memorial Awards for Literature was held to commemorate the memory of Carlos T. Palanca, Sr. through an endeavor that would promote education and culture in the country.

LIST OF WINNERS

The 1962 winners, the twelfth recipients of the awards, were divided into four categories, open only to English and Filipino [Tagalog] short story and one-act play:

== English Division ==
=== Short Story ===
- First Prize: Jose V. Ayala, "The Mountain"
- Second Prize: Gregorio Brillantes, "Journey to the Edge of the Sea"
- Third Prize: Wilfrido D. Nolledo, "Rice Wine"

=== One-Act Play ===
- First Prize: Estrella D. Alfon, "With Patches of Many Hues"
- Second Prize: A. Oliver Flores, "Human Interest"
- Third Prize: Mar V. Puatu, "The Fly-Trap"

== Filipino Division ==
=== Maikling Kwento ===
- First Prize: Liwayway Arceo, "Banyaga"
- Second Prize: Rogelio R. Sikat, "Impeng Negro"
- Third Prize: Buenaventura S. Medina Jr., "Sugat sa Dibdib ng Gabi"

=== Dulang May Isang Yugto ===
- First Prize: Gregorio A. Moral Jr., "May Iba Pang Daigdig"
- Second Prize: Benjamin P. Pascual, "Ang Huling Ulos"
- Third Prize: Gregorio R. Florencio Jr., "Madilim sa Entresuwelo"

== Sources ==
- "The Don Carlos Palanca Memorial Awards for Literature | Winners 1962". Archived from the original on 2009-10-22.
