= Joseph Mercado =

Filipino academic

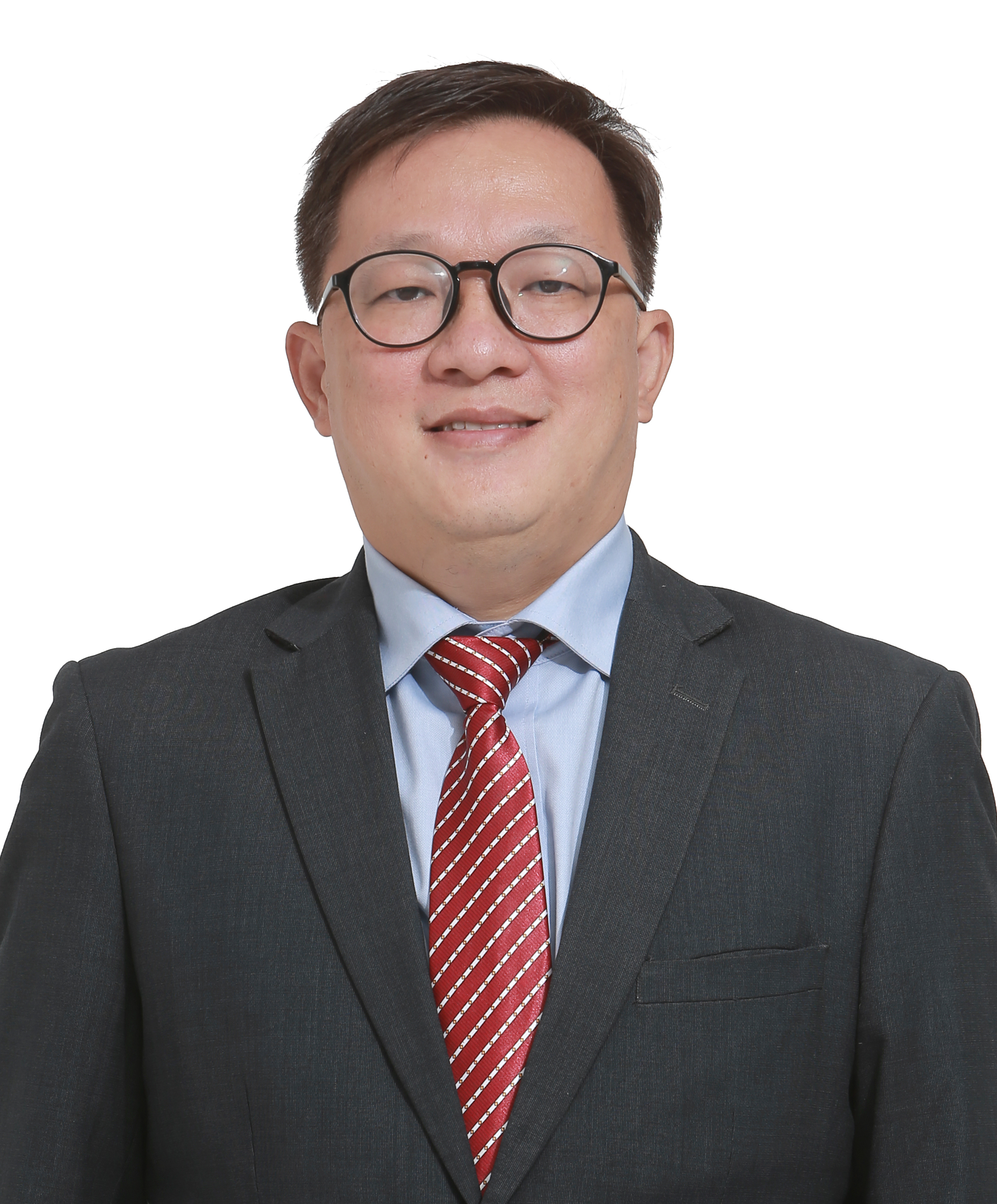
- Mercado in 2021
- Born: July 2, 1972 (age 54); Calapan, Oriental Mindoro
- Education: Polytechnic University of the Philippines (BAS, MASc, DEM); Philippine College of Criminology (PhD)
- Known for: Applied statistics
- Scientific career
- Awards: Distinguished Research Award (Academic International Consortium of Indonesia); Distinguished Service Award (Federation of Alumni Association in PUP Inc.)
- Fields: Statistics, Applied statistics
- Workplaces: Polytechnic University of the Philippines
- Website: https://www.pup.edu.ph

Joseph Mercado FRIEdr (Tagalog pronunciation: [mɚkado], born July 2, 1972) is a Filipino statistician, professor, businessperson and university administrator who served as dean and vice president at the Polytechnic University of the Philippines from 2006 to 2018.

Mercado has co-authored scientific publications involving pharmaceutical sciences, economic analysis, and sociological analysis and received the Distinguished Research Award from the Academic International Consortium of Indonesia for his work in 2016. At present, Mercado is a member of the Philippine Statistical Association, the National Research Council of the Philippines, and the Royal Institution, Singapore as a fellow.

== Early life and education ==
Mercado finished a Bachelor of Applied Statistics degree in 1993, a Master of Applied Science degree in 2000 and a Doctor of Educational Management degree in 2003, all at the Polytechnic University of the Philippines (PUP).

In 2011, Mercado completed a Criminology PhD at the Philippine College of Criminology. After becoming a university vice president, he attended an Executive Development Program held by the Commission on Higher Education (CHED) with other university administrators to further his knowledge on higher education management.

== Career ==
=== Polytechnic University of the Philippines (2005–2018) ===
In 2004, Mercado first sat as the acting director of PUP Ragay. Consequently, in 2006, he was appointed as the director of PUP Sto. Tomas Batangas branch and then designated as the dean of the College of Science. At the same time, he was also the assistant director of the Center for Data and Statistical Analysis. Three years later, he became the executive director for branches and campuses. After a short five-month stint as executive director, Mercado then served as the vice president for branches and campuses for three years. In late 2015, Mercado was then appointed by Emanuel de Guzman, the university's president, to be the vice president for research, extension, planning and development. To pursue personal endeavors, Mercado resigned from office in mid-2018. However, he still serves as an expert advisor to the university, specializing in applied statistics.

== Notable works ==
=== Scientific publications ===
Mercado has authored and co-authored several scientific publications that have been recognized in national and international journals.

Among them are, but not limited to; "Mathematical Model for Estimating Income Tax Revenues in the Philippines through Regression Analysis using Matrices" "Predicting Spousal Physical Violence in the Philippines: a Binary Logistic Regression Analysis” for the European Academic and Research Network; and “Modeling the Philippines Real Gross Domestic Product: A Normal Estimation Equation For Multiple Linear Regression” for the American Institute of Physics’ Journal.

== See also ==
- List of Polytechnic University of the Philippines people
- Calapan
