= 1952 Palanca Awards =

Philippine literary award

2nd Palanca Memorial Awards

The 2nd Carlos Palanca Memorial Awards for Literature was held to commemorate the memory of Carlos T. Palanca, Sr. through an endeavor that would promote education and culture in the country.

== English Division ==
=== Short Story ===
- First Prize: Kerima Polotan, "The Virgin"
- Second Prize: N.V.M. Gonzales, "Children of the Ash-covered Loam"
- Third Prize: Bienvenido N. Santos, "Even Purple Hearts"

== Filipino Division ==
=== Maikling Kwento ===
- First Prize: Pablo N. Bautista, "Kahiwagaan"
- Second Prize: M.J. Ocampo, "Kamatayan sa Gulod"
- Third Prize: Genoveva Edroza Matute, "Pagbabalik"

== Sources ==
- "The Don Carlos Palanca Memorial Awards for Literature | Winners 1952". Archived from the original on 2009-10-22.
