= 1972 Palanca Awards =

Philippine literary award

22nd Palanca Awards

The 22nd Don Carlos Palanca Memorial Awards for Literature was held to commemorate the memory of Don Carlos Palanca Sr. through an endeavor that would promote education and culture in the country.

LIST OF WINNERS

The 1972 winners were divided into six categories, open only to English and Filipino [Tagalog] short story, poetry, and one-act play:

== English Division ==
=== Short Story ===
- First Prize: N.V.M. Gonzales, "The Tomato Game"
- Second Prize: Gregorio Brillantes, "The Apollo Centennial"
- Third Prize: Elsa M. Coscolluela, "After This, Our Exile"

=== Poetry ===
- First Prize: Virginia Moreno, "Batik Maker and Other Poems"
- Second Prize: Artemio Tadena, "The Edge of the Wind"
- Third Prize: Federico Licsi Espino Jr., "Tinikling: A Sheaf of Poems"

=== One-Act Play ===
- First Prize: Jesus T. Peralta, "Grave for Blue Flowers"
- Second Prize: Manuel M. Martell, "The Undiscovered Country"
- Third Prize: Elsa M. Coscolluela, "The Renegade"

Julian E. Dacanay Jr., "Now is the Time for All Good Men to Come to the Aid of their Country"

== Filipino Division ==
=== Maikling Kwento ===
- First Prize: Wilfredo Pa. Virtusio, "Si Loleng Marya Kapra, Mga Araw at Gabi at ang Bukang Liwayway sa Kanyang Buhay"
- Second Prize: Norma Miraflor, "Kumpisal"
- Third Prize: Fanny A. Garcia, "Sandaang Damit"

=== Tula ===
- Special Prizes:

Epifanio San Juan Jr., "1 Mayo 1971 at Iba Pang Tula"
Lamberto E. Antonio, "20 Tula"
Celestino M. Vega, "Bagong Balintawak"
Ruth Elynia S. Mabanglo, "Caloocan: Balada ng Duguang Tinig"
Teo S. Baylen, "Katipunan ng Napapanahong Mga Tula"
Rolando S. Tinio, "Sitsit sa Kuliglig"

=== Dulang May Isang Yugto ===
- First Prize: Rosauro Dela Cruz, "Ang Unang Pagtatanghal ng 'Ang Huling Pasyon ni Hermano Pule'"
- Second Prize: Rolando S. Tinio, "Ang Katwiran ay Katwiran"
- Third Prize: Rey Dela Cruz, "Kumbensiyon ng mga Halimaw"

== Sources ==
- "The Don Carlos Palanca Memorial Awards for Literature | Winners 1972". Archived from the original on 2009-10-22.
