= Isagani R. Cruz =

Filipino writer and literary critic

Isagani Cruz
- Born: Isagani R. Cruz; 1945 (age 80–81)
- Occupations: President, The Manila Times College
- Website: www.isaganicruz.net

Isagani R. Cruz (born 1945) is a Filipino writer and literary critic.

== Education ==
Cruz earned his undergraduate degree from the University of the Philippines Diliman, where he completed a Bachelor of Science in Physics in 1965. He later enrolled at the Ateneo de Manila University to earn an M.A. in English Literature in 1970. He also earned a Ph.D. in English Literature from the University of Maryland in 1976. In 1972 and 2003, Cruz received a Fulbright grant that allowed him to study in the United States.

== Career ==
As a writer, Cruz has received recognition for his contributions to Philippine literature, including more than thirty books. He is a Don Carlos Palanca Memorial Awards for Literature multi-awardee. As a result, he became a member of the Palanca Hall of Fame in 2004 in recognition of his Palanca-winning plays, essays, and short stories in Filipino and English. Cruz also won the SEAWRITE Award in 1991, the Centennial Literary Contest Award in 1998, and the Gawad Balagtas Award in 1999.

Cruz represented the Philippines in several international conferences in Canada, Hong Kong, South Korea, Malaysia, Indonesia and Japan. His scholastic articles have been published in the Philippines and in the United States. In the Philippines, he served as editor for the publications Loyola Studies, Palabas, Interlock, and Malay. Cruz has also been a regular contributor for Philippine periodicals including the Times Journal, the Philippine Daily Inquirer, the TV Times, Modern Romances, Bulaklak, WHO, Parade, Observer, Panorama, Ms. Ellaneous, and Asiaweek. Apart from being a creative writer, Cruz is also known as a film and drama reviewer.

As an educator, Cruz worked with prominent Philippine universities. Prior to his official retirement, he held the Alfredo E. Litiatco Lectures at the De La Salle University, where he chaired for the Department of Literature and Philippine Languages. He also became a publisher at the De La Salle University Press. While at the De La Salle University, he taught a variety of subjects, which included Science Fiction, Advanced Writing, The Teaching of Literature, and Computer Literacy. He also taught literature at the Ateneo de Manila University and the University of Santo Tomas. He was an assistant professor at the University of the Philippines in Diliman, Quezon City and a director of the Teachers Academy at Far Eastern University. He also became a professor at universities in the United States, Japan, and Taiwan. He became a visiting fellow at St Antony's College at Oxford University.

As an advocate of Philippine culture, Cruz was a member of groups and institutions that promote Philippine literature and art. He was a member and founding chair of the Manila Critics Circle, the Manunuri ng Pelikulang Pilipino (Philippine Film Critics), a former head of the Philippine Studies Association of the Philippines, the University of the Philippines Writers Club, the Cultural Research Association of the Philippines, the American Studies Association of the Philippines, the Philippine Tournament Bridge Association, and the National Research Council of the Philippines. Cruz was also the Philippine bibliographer of the Modern Language Association of America, as well as the president of the Philippine Fulbright Scholars Association.

On July 4, 2023, DLSU Harlequin Theatre Guild announced their theatrical production of Cruz' Halimaw to be staged in October 2023. Featuring Drag Race Philippines' Viñas Deluxe, Noel Comia Jr., and Bene Manaois.
