= Tuvera =

Tuvera is a surname. Notable people with the surname include:

- Kerima Polotan Tuvera (1925–2011), Filipino fiction writer, essayist, and journalist
- Voltaire Tuvera Gazmin (born 1944), retired Filipino soldier
