= 1967 Palanca Awards =

Philippine literary award

17th Palanca Awards

The 17th Don Carlos Palanca Memorial Awards for Literature was held to commemorate the memory of Don Carlos Palanca Sr. through an endeavor that would promote education and culture in the country.

LIST OF WINNERS

The 1967 winners, the seventeenth recipients of the awards, were divided into six categories, open only to English and Filipino [Tagalog] short story, poetry, and one-act play:

== English Division ==
=== Short Story ===
- First Prize: Gregorio C. Brillantes, “The Fires of the Sun, The Crystalline Sky”
- Second Prize: Gilda Cordero-Fernando, “Early in Our Lord”
- Third Prize: Tita Lacambra Ayala, “Everything”

=== Poetry ===
- First Prize: Edith L. Tiempo, “The Tracks of Babylon and Others”
- Second Prize: Marra Pl. Lanot, “Sheaves of Things Burning”
- Third Prize: Epifanio San Juan Jr., “The Exorcism”

=== One-Act Play ===
- First Prize: Nestor Torre Jr., “And a Happy Birthday”
- Second Prize: Jesus T. Peralta, “Voices of Laughter”
- Third Prize: Nestor Torre Jr., “Apparitions”

== Filipino Division ==
=== Maikling Kwento ===
- First Prize: Efren R. Abueg, “Ang Kamatayan ni Tiyo Samuel”
- Second Prize: Domingo Landicho, “Talulot sa Pagas na Lupa”
- Third Prize: Epifanio San Juan Jr., “Masaya ang Alitaptap sa Labi ng Kabibi”

=== Tula ===
- First Prize: Federico Licsi Espino Jr., “Toreng Bato ... Kastilyong Pawid at Bagwis ng Guniguni”
- Second Prize: Bienvenido Ramos, “Iba't Ibang Tula”
- Third Prize: Ruben Vega, “O Sanggol na Hari”

=== Dulang May Isang Yugto ===
- First Prize: Fernando L. Samonte, “Gabi at Araw”
- Second Prize: Benjamin P. Pascual, “Isang Araw ng Paghuhukom”
- Third Prize: Levy Balgos Dela Cruz, “Isang Kundiman”

== Sources ==
- "The Don Carlos Palanca Memorial Awards for Literature | Winners 1967". Archived from the original on 2009-10-22.
