= Hermano Pule =

19th-century Filipino religious leader

- Image of Hermano Pule, courtesy of Ryan Palad, head of the Tayabas Studies and Creative Writing Center
- Born: Apolinario de la Cruz; July 22, 1815; Lucban, Tayabas (now Quezon), Captaincy General of the Philippines, Spanish Empire
- Died: November 4, 1841 (aged 26); Tayabas, Tayabas, Captaincy General of the Philippines, Spanish Empire
- Cause of death: Execution by firing squad
- Occupations: Lay brother; religious leader
- Years active: 1832–1841
- Known for: Cofradía de San José Revolt

Apolinario de la Cruz (July 22, 1815 – November 4, 1841), better known as Hermano Pule (Spanish: [eɾˈmano puˈle], Spanish for "Brother Pule"; also spelled Hermano Puli), was a Filipino religious leader who founded and led the Cofradía de San José (Confraternity of Saint Joseph). The cofradía was established in 1832 in response to the racially discriminatory practices of the Catholic Church in the Philippines. During the Spanish colonial period, Catholic religious orders refused to admit native Filipinos as members. In retaliation, Pule established his own religious order that was exclusive for native Filipinos. During its peak, the cofradía had 4,500 to 5,000 members from the provinces of Tayabas, Batangas, and Laguna. Fearing an armed rebellion, the Spanish colonial government sent military forces to suppress the cofradía, an attack that was resisted by Hermano Pule and his followers on October 23, 1841. However, more troops were sent and the cofradía was finally quelled by the colonial military forces on November 1, 1841. Pule was then captured, tried, and executed.

== Early life ==
Apolinario de la Cruz was born on July 22, 1815, (Note: Filipino historian Gregorio F. Zaide published Hermano Pule's date of birth as July 22, 1815 based on Pule's baptismal record dated July 23, 1815. This is the date recognized by the National Historical Commission of the Philippines. Another estimate is July 23, 1814 by Tayabas historian Ryan Palad, for the reason that Hermano Pule (Apolinario de la Cruz) was named after St. Apollinaris of Ravenna, whose feast is on July 23. Other estimates include: July 31, 1815 by David Reeves Sturtevant, year 1814 by Reynaldo Ileto and Onofre Corpuz, and year 1815 by David Sweet.) in Barrio Pandác in the town of Lucban in Tayabas province (now Quezon) back when the Philippines was an overseas territory of the Kingdom of Spain. His parents—Pablo de la Cruz and Juana Andres—were peasants (Note: Onofre Corpuz believed that Hermano Pule's family was well-established in the community, due to their use of surnames before Governor-General Narciso Clavería required all native Filipinos to adopt Hispanic surnames in 1849. Prior to that decree, many Filipinos did not use surnames. Despite this, Manuel F. Martinez is certain that Pule's family did not belong to the principalía.) and devout Catholics. Apolinario de la Cruz was literate, but stated that he had no formal education. Despite that, it is very likely that he received primary religious instruction and attended the local public primary school in Lucban. In 1829, he decided to become a priest and tried to join the Order of Preachers in Manila. During those times, Roman Catholic religious orders barred indios (native people of the Philippines) from joining, thus De la Cruz's application was rejected for the sole reason of his race. He then decided to work as a donado (lay brother) at the San Juan de Dios Hospital where he was admitted to the Cofradía de San Juan de Dios, a brotherhood affiliated with the hospital open to indios. During this time, he improved his public speaking and studied the Bible along with other religious writings.

== Cofradía de San José ==
=== Formation and expansion ===
In December 1832, 18-year-old De la Cruz, along with indio secular priest Br. Ciriaco de los Santos and 19 other individuals from Tayabas, founded the Hermandad de la Archi-Cofradía del Glorioso Señor San José y de la Virgen del Rosario (Brotherhood of the Great Sodality of the Glorious Lord Saint Joseph and of the Virgin of the Rosary), shortened to Cofradía de San José (Confraternity of St. Joseph). He then became known to his followers as Hermano Pule (Brother Pule). The brotherhood fostered the practice of Christian virtues centered around the cults of Saint Francis of Assisi and the Virgin of Antipolo. They also incorporated elements of pre-colonial beliefs such as the use of anting-anting (talismans). Most of its adherents were from Tayabas, Laguna, Cavite, and Batangas, and some were from Camarines Norte and Camarines Sur. The cofradía prohibited Spaniards and mestizos from joining without Hermano Pule's permission as a form of retaliation against the Church for discriminating against natives. Hermano Pule continued to work at the San Juan de Dios Hospital and regularly corresponded with his followers through letters, which were read aloud to the cofradía members. Some cofradía members also found time to visit Hermano Pule in Manila. In Hermano Pule's absence, the cofradía was led by hermano mayor Octavio Ygnacio "Purgatorio" de San Jorge (Note: Alternative forms of his name: "Octavio Ignacio de San Jorge", "Octavio Ignacio San Jorge", and "Octabio San Jorge".) and Br. Ciriaco delos Santos, who was the cofradía's treasurer and spiritual adviser.

Members of the cofradía met on the 19th of each month in honor of Saint Joseph, whose feast is 19 March. They also paid monthly fees of one real to cover the cost of their monthly Masses and fiestas. The monthly Mass was held in the parish church of Lucban, and was facilitated by the parish priest, Fr. Manuel Sancho.

In 1837, the confraternity was renamed Cofradía del Sr. San José i voto del Santísimo Rosario and evangelized in Lucban, Majayjay, and Sariaya. By 1841, the cofradía had grown to an estimated 4,500 to 5,000 members.

=== Suppression ===
The Spanish authorities were unaware of the cofradía's existence until 1840. However, as early as 1833, Filipino priests noticed their activities in the vicinity of Mount San Cristobal and Mount Banahaw.

In 1840, Fr. Antonio Mateo, the vicar of Tayabas, became suspicious of the cofradía's monthly masses and fees, thus Fr. Manuel Sancho stopped holding Masses for the cofradía. Mateo and Sancho then accused the cofradía of conducting heretical activities. Due to religious persecution and the increasing number of its members, Hermano Pule decided to have the cofradía recognized by the colonial government and the Catholic Church. He first sought recognition and authorization from the Bishop of Nueva Caceres but his request was denied. Not discouraged, he then sought the approval of the Real Audiencia but he was also ignored.

In addition to the accusations of heresy, there was a rumor that the cofradía was planning to murder the alcaldes of Camarines and Laguna. The Franciscan friars of Tayabas passed this information to the gobernadorcillo of Lucban, who ordered a raid on October 19, 1840, during the cofradía's monthly meeting. The authorities arrested 243 cofradía members and confiscated their cash box, two large portraits of Hermano Pule depicted as a saint, and his letters to the cofradía. The Spanish alcalde mayor (provincial governor) of Tayabas, Don Joaquín Ortega, whose wife was a member of the cofradía, ordered the release of the prisoners, reasoning that it was an ecclesiastical matter. Afterwards, in early 1841, the cofradía transferred to Majayjay, hometown of "Purgatorio" de San Jorge.

Hermano Pule immediately sent a letter to Archbishop José Seguí in Manila rebuking the acts of the Tayabas friars, and accusing them of beatings and threatening excommunication of cofradía members. He also challenged the friars' authority to perform such acts because the aims of the cofradía were never against the Catholic faith. On January 29, 1841, Pule sent a letter to the Bishop of Nueva Cáceres restating that the cofradía was not against canon law. The letter was forwarded to the juez provisor of the bishopric, who endorsed it to Fr. Antonio Mateo and Fr. Manuel Sancho, who rejected Pule's petition.

In June 1841, with the help of influential supporters (including Domingo Róxas), Pule again sent a letter to the Real Audiencia requesting for the cofradía to be recognized. This letter was forwarded to the office of Governor-General Marcelino de Oraá Lecumberri. The Governor-General personally reviewed the petition and was disturbed by the cofradía's rule that excluded Spaniards and mestizos from joining without Pule's permission. This made De Oraá believe that it was a seditious organization where religion was used as a cover for potential insurgence against Spanish authorities. De Oraá then recommended Pule's dismissal from San Juan de Dios Hospital and had the cofradía outlawed in July 1841, ordering its disbandment and the arrests of its members. Pule immediately went into hiding to avoid capture.

In September 1841, Hermano Pule traveled from Manila to Bay, Laguna, to meet with the cofradía members that evaded capture. Anticipating an imminent attack, Pule and Purgatorio rallied 4,000 followers at Barrio Isabang on the slopes of Mount Banahaw. A group of pagan Aetas from Sierra Madre also allied themselves with the cofradía.

On October 23, 1841, alcalde mayor Joaquín Ortega, with orders from Manila, led 300 men in an attack on the cofradía's camp. The 4,000-strong cofradía was able to resist the attack, which resulted in the deaths of Ortega and many of his men. Pule then transferred his camp to Alitao, near Tayabas town, where his followers crowned him "King of the Tagalogs". By that time, he had considered schism with the Church.

When the news of the Ortega's defeat reached the Governor-General, better-armed reinforcements from Manila were sent to Tayabas. On November 1, 1841, Col. Joaquín Huet arrived in Tayabas with 800 to 1,000 soldiers. They initially offered amnesty to the members of the cofradía, with the exception of Hermano Pule and other senior leaders, but the cofradía refused. Prior to Colonel Huet's arrival, Pule and the cofradía leaders promised their followers of victory through divine intervention. The cofradía fighters were made to believe that they were invulnerable to enemy bullets, and that angels from Heaven would come down and help them in battle, and finally the ground would open up and swallow the enemy troops. The battle between the cofradía and the government forces lasted four hours. Three to five hundred men, women, elders, and children were killed on the cofradía side. Afterwards, 500 were taken prisoner, including 300 women. The rest of the cofradía escaped to the forests and were not pursued. Only eleven were wounded on the government's side.

== Capture, trial, and execution ==
Pule fled to Barrio Gibanga in Sariaya but was captured by Colonel Huet's forces the following evening. On November 4, 1841, after a summary trial held at the Casa Comunidad in Tayabas town, he was tortured and later executed by firing squad at age 26. The Spanish authorities had his body quartered. His severed head, hands, and feet were exhibited throughout Tayabas province. (Note: Quennie Ann Palafox of the National Historical Commission reports that Pule's head was "stored in a cage for public view as it was put on top of a pole stuck along the roadside leading to Majayjay town". While Teodoro Agoncillo wrote that Pule's head was "hung in front of his parents' house in Lucban" and his hands and feet were "hung inside cages and placed in the guardhouses of Tayabas".)

The other leaders of the Cofradía—Octavio Ygnacio "Purgatorio" de San Jorge, Dionisio de los Reyes, Francisco Espinosa de la Cruz, Gregorio Miguel de Jesus, and around 200 other cofradía prisoners—were also executed the same day as Pule.

== Aftermath and legacy ==
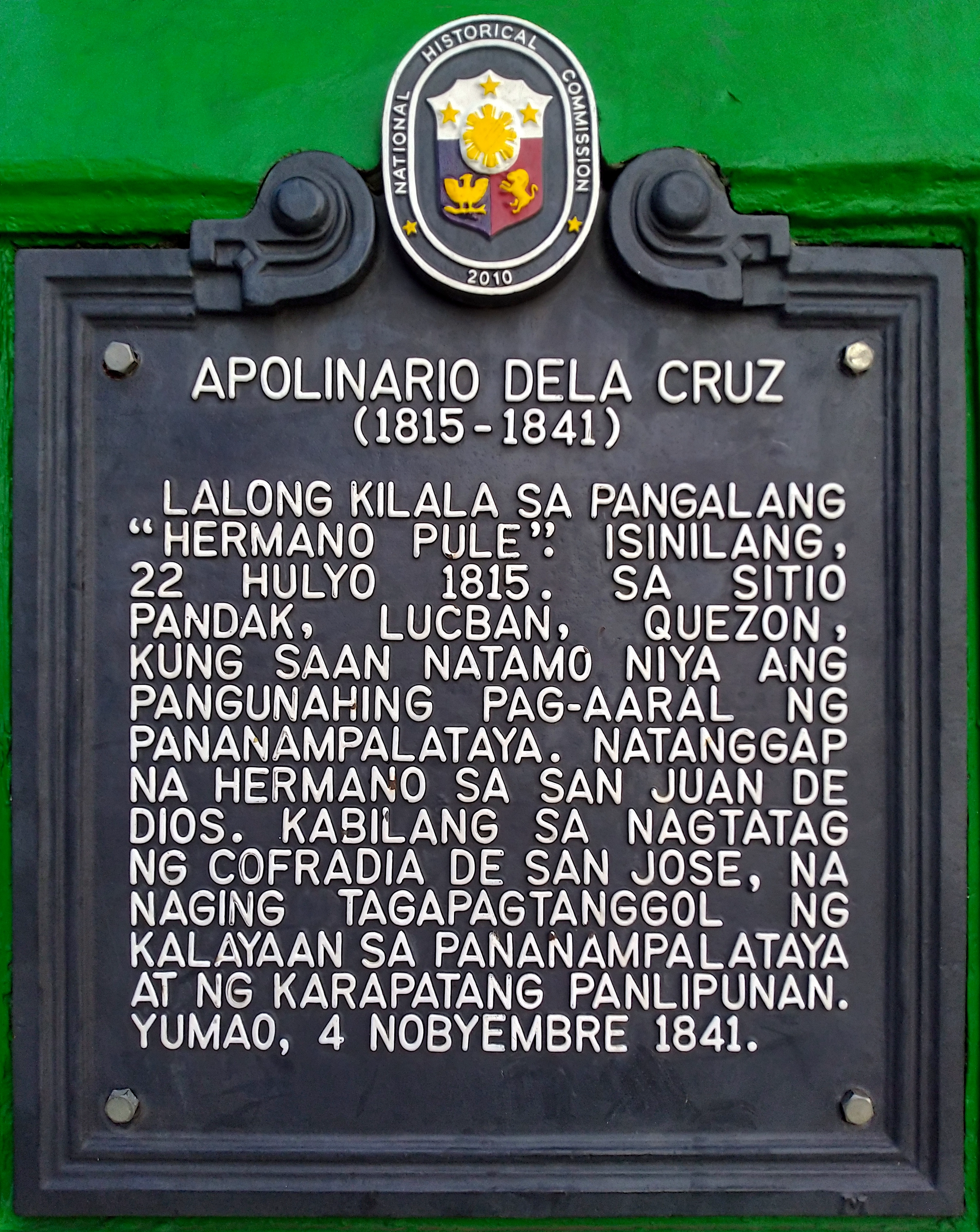
Historical marker installed in Tayabas, Quezon, by the National Historical Commission of the Philippines to commemorate Hermano Pule

=== Public reaction and Supreme Court investigation ===
The 1841 Alitao massacre became a public controversy in Manila, where flyers criticizing the government's actions were circulated. The Real Audiencia blamed De Oraá for his failure to consult them prior to sending troops, and his order to give no quarter to the cofradía fighters. Meanwhile, Governor-General De Oraá blamed Colonel Huet for allegedly exceeding his orders.

After investigating the massacre, the Supreme Court of Spain officially reprimanded Governor-General De Oraá. The court affirmed that Pule and the cofradía had no political motives. However, they acknowledged that the cofradía had committed an ecclesiastical offense for conducting religious activities without the approval of the Catholic Church.

=== Mutiny of the Tayabas Regiment ===
On January 20, 1843, members of the Spanish Armed Forces' Tayabas Regiment stationed in Manila, led by Sergeant Irineo Samaniego, rose in mutiny in retaliation for the November 1841 massacre of the cofradía members. They managed to capture Fort Santiago and held it for a few hours, but were defeated the next day. Eighty-two mutineers were immediately executed on Bagumbayan Field, while the rest were imprisoned.

=== Revival of the Cofradía and the origin of the colorum ===
In 1870, the Cofradía de San José was revived under the leadership of Profeta y Pontifice ('Prophet and Pope') Juanario Labios. The members of the revived cofradía claimed to have witnessed the alleged joint apparition of the Virgin of the Rosary, Hermano Pule, and Octavio Ygnacio "Purgatorio" de San Jorge. The activities of the revived cofradía ended in 1871 when Labios and his followers were captured and banished to Mindoro and the Calamian Islands.

The surviving members of the Cofradía de San José, who lived in the vicinity of Mount San Cristobal and Mount Banahaw, continued with their religious activities and were known as colorums, a corruption of the Latin phrase in saecula saeculorum ('unto the ages of ages'), which was used at Mass to end prayers. During the American colonial era, the term colorum was applied to all the cults and insurgent groups characterized by Roman Catholic devotion, folk superstition, and hero worship. Some of these groups are still active today in various provinces in the Philippines.

Beginning in the 1930s, the colloquial meaning in the Philippines behind colorum became extended to any illegal activity, notably the unregistered public utility vehicles.

=== Commemoration ===
A monument to Hermano Pule now stands on the city boundary of Tayabas and Lucena. His death anniversary, November 4, is a holiday in Quezon.

A play titled "Ang Unang Pagtatanghal ng 'Ang Huling Pasyon ni Hermano Pule'" was written by Rosauro de la Cruz and was first performed in 1975. It won the first prize for the one-act play in Filipino category of the 1972 Palanca Awards. (Note: Entries to the Palanca competition are previously unpublished pieces in their manuscript form. Hence, the play won the award before its first performance. See Palanca Awards)

The historical film Ang Hapis at Himagsik ni Hermano Puli (The Agony and Fury of Brother Puli), directed by Gil Portes and starring Aljur Abrenica as Hermano Puli, was released in September 2016.
