= Adrian Cristobal =

Filipino writer (1932–2007)

18th Secretary of Labor
- In office 1971–1972
- President: Ferdinand Marcos
- Preceded by: Blas Ople
- Succeeded by: Blas Ople

Personal details
- Born: Adrian Empremiado Cristobal; February 20, 1932
- Died: December 22, 2007 (aged 75) Makati, Philippines
- Resting place: Santuario de San Antonio Parish Columbarium
- Education: University of the East
- Occupation: Writer
- Awards: Palanca Awards

Adrian Empremiado Cristobal Sr. (February 20, 1932 – December 22, 2007) was a Filipino writer who frequently touched on political and historical themes. Perhaps best known to the public for his "Breakfast Table" newspaper column, he was also a Palanca Award–winning playwright, fictionist and essayist. He likewise held several positions in government during the administration of President Ferdinand E. Marcos.

Upon his death from lung cancer on December 22, 2007, a Resolution was proposed in the Philippine Senate citing Cristobal as "a prolific journalist, a political satirist, a historical writer and lecturer, a well-respected columnist, a brilliant fictionist and essayist, a creative playwright, a literary genius and a hardworking publisher."

== Biography ==
Cristobal studied at the University of the East, though he would drop out of college. By age 15, he had won literary prizes for his fiction, and by 17, his byline was appearing in the pages of the country's leading newspapers such as the Manila Chronicle. As a young writer, he became affiliated with a group of fellow writers based in U.P. Diliman known as the Ravens.

In the 1960 Palanca Awards, Cristobal garnered the Second Prize in the One-Act Play (English) category for his satirical play The Largest Crocodile in the World. All copies of the play have reputedly been lost upon the initiative of the politician believed to have been depicted in the work. Cristobal again won the Second Prize in the 1983 Palanca Awards, this time in the essay category. Cristobal also authored two books on the national hero Andres Bonifacio; The Tragedy of the Revolution and The Trial. In 1962, Cristobal was contracted to write the screenplay of Gerardo de Leon's film adaptation of El Filibusterismo, for which he won a FAMAS award for Best Screenplay.

Cristobal was among the intellectuals enticed by Ferdinand Marcos to join his administration. During martial law, he headed the speech-writing office of the Office of the President. He was later appointed as the Chairman of the Social Security System and a member of the Board of Regents of the University of the Philippines.

After the ouster of Marcos in 1986, Cristobal joined the Philippine Daily Inquirer as a newspaper columnist. He left the Inquirer in 2000 to become the publisher of the Manila Times. After a short stint with the Times, he joined the Manila Bulletin as an associate editor and columnist. He remained affiliated with the Bulletin, and was also the publisher of the Philippine Graphic magazine at the time of his death.

Cristobal was an active member and organizer within the Philippine literary community. He founded the Unyon ng Mga Manunulat ng Pilipinas (UMPIL), a union of Filipino writers. As a member of the U.P. Board of Regents, he initiated efforts that led to the establishment of the U.P. Institute of Creative Writing.

His daughter Celina, was publisher and editor-in-chief of a socio-political magazine, The Review, in the late 1970s and was later lifestyle editor of the Manila Chronicle in the 1990s. She was elected Vice-Chairman of UMPIL and presently sits as secretary-general.

In 2005, Cristobal's son, Adrian Jr., was appointed by President Gloria Macapagal Arroyo as the Director-General of the Intellectual Property Office of the Philippines.
