= Pinoy Weekly =

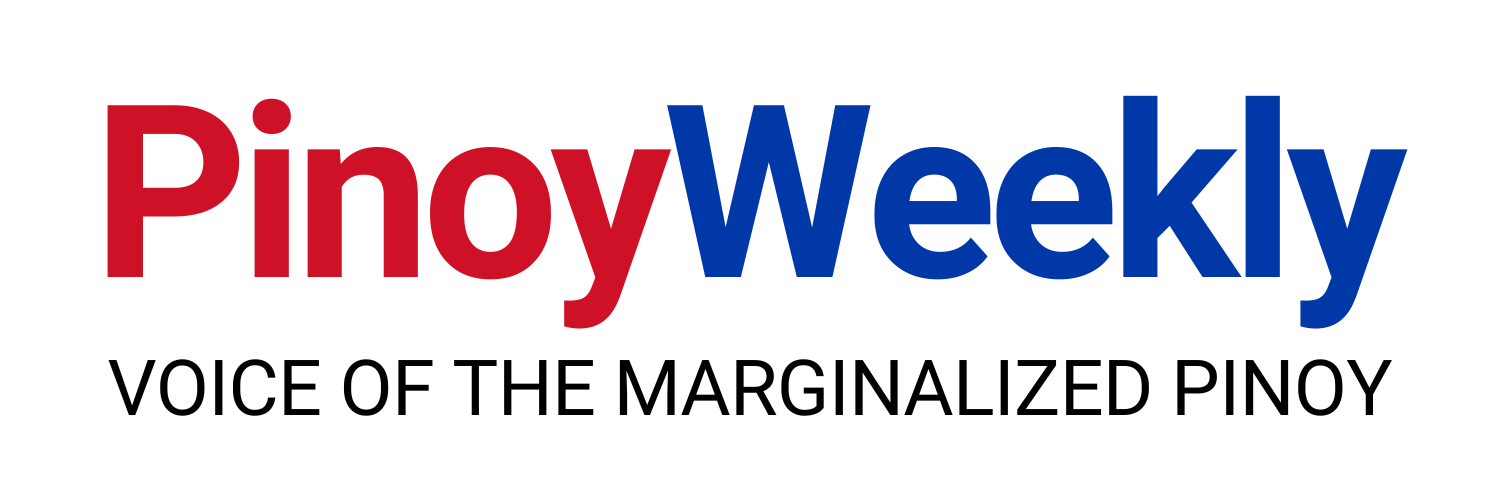
- Type: Weekly newspaper
- Format: Tabloid, Online Newsmagazine
- Owner(s): PinoyMedia Center, Inc.
- Editor-in-chief: Marc Lino J. Abila
- Founded: 2002
- Political alignment: Left-wing
- Headquarters: Quezon City, Philippines
- Website: www.pinoyweekly.org

Pinoy Weekly is published by PinoyMedia Center. Inc., a non-government organization devoted to democratizing the practice of journalism in the country, and focuses on investigative stories that concern what it terms as the "underreported" sectors of Philippine society: peasants, workers, overseas Filipinos, youth, indigenous peoples, and women. It is currently a weekly print and online newsmagazine, and previously published special print issues, a Mindanao edition, international editions in Israel, Taiwan, and Japan.

Pinoy Weekly's writers have previously been finalists for the Jaime V. Ongpin Awards for Excellence in Journalism. It has also been cited by the Center for Media Freedom and Responsibility, in the November 2006 issue of the Philippine Journalism Review: "If other tabloids are known for their sensationalized stories on crime and sex or splashy entertainment and sports pages, Pinoy Weekly comes across as a serious paper with analyses on issues affecting citizens, especially the marginalized."

Currently, it is run by an editorial team: Marc Lino J. Abila (editor-in-chief), Neil Ambion (managing editor), and Andrea Jobelle Adan (associate editor). Former editors and writers include Kenneth Roland A. Guda, Ilang-Ilang D. Quijano, Soliman A. Santos, Macky Macaspac, RC Asa, D'Jay Lazaro, Sharon Cabusao, Angel Tesorero, and Prestoline Suyat. It also features columns from progressive writers Rolando B. Tolentino, Teo S. Marasigan, Atty. Antonio La Viña, Atty. Remigio Saladero Jr., Gert Ranjo-Libang, Jerome Adonis, Vencer Crisostomo, Anton Dulce, Danilo Arana Arao, Danilo Ramos, Jun Cruz Reyes, Boy Villasanta, Mark Angeles, Mykel Andrada, Steven Abada, Ericson Acosta, Rogelio Ordoñez, poetry group Kilometer 64, Carlos Conde, Antonio Tujan, and Deo Macalma. It also has regular contributions from other committed writers, photographers and artists.

Among its previous editorial consultants are visual artist and former dean of the University of the Philippines College of Fine Arts Leonilo Doloricon, University of the Philippines journalism professor and columnist Luis Teodoro, National Artist for Literature Dr. Bienvenido Lumbera, nationalist writer and former editor in chief Rogelio Ordonez, and writer, playwright, director and activist Bonifacio P. Ilagan.

Current PMC board of trustees include Tolentino, La Viña, Prestoline Suyat, JL Burgos, Kenneth Guda, Dr. Ma. Diosa Labiste, filmmaker Kiri Dalena, and poet-musician Jesus Manuel Santiago.

== Censorship ==
In 2019, Pinoy Weekly issues were burned by members of "pro-government group" Pagkakaisa Mamamayan Tungo sa Kaayusan in conflict with urban poor rights organization Kadamay in Pandi, Bulacan. The group was accompanied by elements of the Philippine National Police and the Armed Forces of the Philippines. PW editor-in-chief Kenneth Guda called the incident as an attack on press freedom.

A similar incident happened in Pandi in July 2020, when police officers confiscated issues of PW from Kadamay's office. According to the PNP, the publication was "illegal" and "teaches people to fight the government." Guda filed a complaint with the Commission on Human Rights, stating that the confiscation "deprived our readers from marginalized communities of their right to access information, opinions, and analyses on national, local and sectoral issues."

In June 2022, the National Telecommunications Commission (NTC) ordered the websites of Pinoy Weekly and Bulatlat blocked on accusations of "supporting terrorism." National Security Adviser Hermogenes Esperon included the news organizations as affiliates of the Communist Party of the Philippines, alleging that they use "misinformation ... to actively support organizations affiliated with the CPP-NPA-NDF."

The National Union of Journalists of the Philippines condemned the block, calling it a press freedom violation and "part of a systematic campaign against independent media." Multiple international organizations also released statements in support of Pinoy Weekly and Bulatlat. The Committee to Protect Journalists also urged the Philippine government to reverse its decision and "cease fabricating spurious reasons to suppress the free press."

On August 2022, the Quezon City court ordered the NTC to unblock Bulatlat and Pinoy Weekly, however both sites are still blocked as of 2024. In November 2025, a Quezon City court granted Bulatlat’s petition to nullify the NTC memorandum that ordered the blocking of Pinoy Weekly and 26 other websites, saying that the NTC blocking constituted censorship and a violation of Constitutional guarantees for freedom of the press, speech and expression.
