= Estrella Alfon =

Filipina author

- Born: May 27, 1917; Cebu, Philippine Islands
- Died: December 27, 1983 (aged 66)

Estrella D. Alfon (May 27, 1917 – December 27, 1983) was a prolific Filipina author who wrote in English. She was a professor of Creative Writing at the University of the Philippines in Manila, though she only had an AA degree. She was a member of the UP Writers Club.

== Personal life ==
Estrella Alfon was born in Cebu City in 1917. Her parents were shopkeepers. She attended college, studying medicine. After being mistakenly diagnosed with tuberculosis and sent to a sanitarium, she resigned from her pre-medical education, leaving with an Associate of Arts degree.

Alfon had several children: Alan Rivera, Esmeralda "Mimi" Rivera, Brian Alfon, Estrella "Twinkie" Alfon, and Rita "Daday" Alfon (deceased). She had ten grandchildren. Her youngest daughter was a stewardess for Saudi Arabian Airlines, and was part of the Flight 163 crew on August 19, 1980, when an in-flight fire forced the aircraft to land in Riyadh. A delayed evacuation resulted in the death of all aboard the flight.

Alfon died on December 27, 1983, following a heart attack suffered on-stage during the Manila Film Festival Awards Night.

== Career ==
While a student in Cebu when, Alfon published her first short stories, in periodicals such as Graphic Weekly Magazine, Philippine Magazine, and the Sunday Tribune. She was a prolific storywriter, playwright, and journalist. In spite of being a Cebuana, she wrote almost exclusively in English. She published her first story, “Grey Confetti”, in the Graphic in 1935. Alfon was at times charged with sloppy writing and suspected of writing exclusively for profit, rather than passion.

She was the only female member of the Veronicans, an avant-garde group of writers in the 1930s led by Francisco Arcellana and H.R. Ocampo, being also regarded as their muse. The Veronicans are recognized as the first group of Filipino writers to write almost exclusively in English and were formed prior to the World War II. Alfon was a regular contributor to Manila-based national magazines, having several stories cited in Jose Garcia Villa’s annual honor rolls. Thelma E. Arambulo described her in the following way:

Alfon was one writer who unashamedly drew from her own real-life experiences. In some stories, the first-person narrator is “Estrella” or “Esther.” She is not just a writer, but one who consciously refers to her act of writing the stories. In other stories, Alfon is still easily identifiable in her first-person reminiscences of the past: evacuation during the Japanese occupation; estrangement from a husband; life after the war. In the Espeleta stories, Alfon uses the editorial “we” to indicate that as a member of that community, she shares their feelings and responses towards the incidents in the story. But she sometimes slips back to being a first-person narrator. The impression is that although she shares the sentiments of her neighbors, she is still a distinct personality who detaches herself from the scene in order to understand it better. This device of separating herself as narrator from the other characters is contained within the larger strategy of "distantiation" that of the writer from her strongly autobiographical material.

In the 1950s, her short story, "Fairy Tale for the City", was condemned by the Catholic League of the Philippines as being "obscene". She was even brought to court on these charges. While many of her fellow writers did stand by her, some did not. These events hurt her deeply.

In spite of having only a basic A.A. degree, she was eventually appointed as a professor of Creative Writing at the University of the Philippines, Manila. She held the National Fellowship in Fiction post at the U.P. Creative Writing Center in 1979. She would also serve on the Philippine Board of Tourism in the 1970s.

== Awards ==
- 1940: A collection of her early short stories, “Dear Esmeralda,” won Honorable Mention in the Commonwealth Literary Award.
- 1961-1962: Four of her one-act plays won all the prizes in the Arena Theater Play Writing Contest: “Losers Keepers” (first prize), “Strangers” (second prize), “Rice” (third prize), and “Beggar” (fourth prize).
- 1961-1962: Won top prize in the Palanca Contest for “With Patches of Many Hues.”
- 1974: Second place Palanca Award for her short story, "The White Dress".
- 1979: National Fellowship in Fiction post at the U.P. Creative Writing Center.

Alfon won the Palanca Awards a number of times:

- Forever Witches, one-act play (Third place, 1960)
- With Patches of Many Hues, one-act play (First place, 1962)
- Tubig, One-act Play (Second place, 1963)
- The Knitting Straw, one-act play, (Third place, 1968)
- The White Dress, short story (Second place, 1974)

== Partial bibliography ==
- Magnificence and Other Stories (1960)
- Stories of Estrella Alfon (1994) (published posthumously)
- Servant Girl (short story)

== Legacy ==
In an interview, Luisa Igloria said of Alfon:

Estrella Alfon writes about everyday life, but she captures the details in this dazzling, intense light. She could write about the ordinary and make it extraordinary. She could write about a day on the farm or a picnic with friends or a poor laundry woman wishing that her life were different because she was being abused by her mistress. They were very simple stories about ordinary people, whose lives we don't know until she uncovers them in the stories. I was just hooked. Whatever designs my mother may have had, they worked. I feel so much more fulfilled because I had that early gift. - Luisa Igloria interview

== External links and other sources ==
- www.bisaya.com Visayan Literature page—defunct
- www.sushidog.com Servant Girl (Short Story)
- The History of Filipino Women's Writings by Riitta Vartti
- Full Text: Rice by Estrella Alfon
- Full Text: Magnificence by Estrella Alfon
- Analysis of Magnificience on Lit React
