= 1968 Palanca Awards =

Literary award

18th Palanca Awards

The 18th Don Carlos Palanca Memorial Awards for Literature was held to commemorate the memory of Don Carlos Palanca Sr. through an endeavor that would promote education and culture in the country.

LIST OF WINNERS

The 1968 winners, the eighteenth recipients of the awards, were divided into six categories, open only to English and Filipino [Tagalog] short story, poetry, and one-act play:

== English Division ==
=== Short Story ===
- First Prize: Elsa M. Coscolluela, "All About Me"
- Second Prize: Edilberto K. Tiempo, "Kulasising Hari"
- Third Prize: Alfred A. Yuson, "The Hill of Samuel"

=== Poetry ===
- First Prize: Burce Bunao, "The Quiver and the Fear"
- Second Prize: Cirilo F. Bautista, "The Cave and Other Poems"
- Third Prize: Emmanuel Torres, "Having a Drink of Water from a Broken Fire Hydrant..."

=== One-Act Play ===
- First Prize: Nestor Torre Jr., "A Second Generation"
- Second Prize: Mar B. Arcega, "The Corruptibles"
- Third Prize: Estrella D. Alfon, "Knitting Straw"

== Filipino Division ==
=== Maikling Kwento ===
- First Prize: Epifanio San Juan Jr., "Anay"
- Second Prize: Pedro L. Ricarte, "Si Boy Nicolas"
- Third Prize: Domingo Landicho, "Himagsik ni Emmanuel Lazaro"

=== Tula ===
- First Prize: Bienvenido Ramos, "Mga Ibon at Iba pang Tula"
- Second Prize: Victor Fernandez, "Ito ba Ang Kabihasnan"
- Third Prize: Martin D. Pantaleon, "Kaktus ng Bungo"

=== Dulang May Isang Yugto ===
- First Prize: Dionisio S. Salazar, "Makapaghihintay ang Amerika"
- Second Prize: Agapito M. Joaquin, "Bubungang Lata"
- Third Prize: Lazaro R. Banag Jr., "Sa Kuko ng Agila"

== Sources ==
- "The Don Carlos Palanca Memorial Awards for Literature | Winners 1968". Archived from the original on 2009-10-22.
