= Polytechnic University of the Philippines Ragay =

Public university in Camarines Sur, Philippines

Polytechnic University of the Philippines Ragay Branch
- Politeknikong Unibersidad ng Pilipinas sa Ragay (Filipino)
- Motto: Tanglaw ng Bayan
- Type: Satellite campus
- Established: 2001
- President: Manuel Muhi
- Director: Dir. Edwin G. Malabuyoc
- Location: Ragay, Camarines Sur, Philippines; 13°49′07″N 122°47′50″E
- University hymn: Imno ng PUP (PUP Hymn)
- Colors: Maroon and Gold
- Mascot: Pylon
- Website: www.pup.edu.ph/ragay
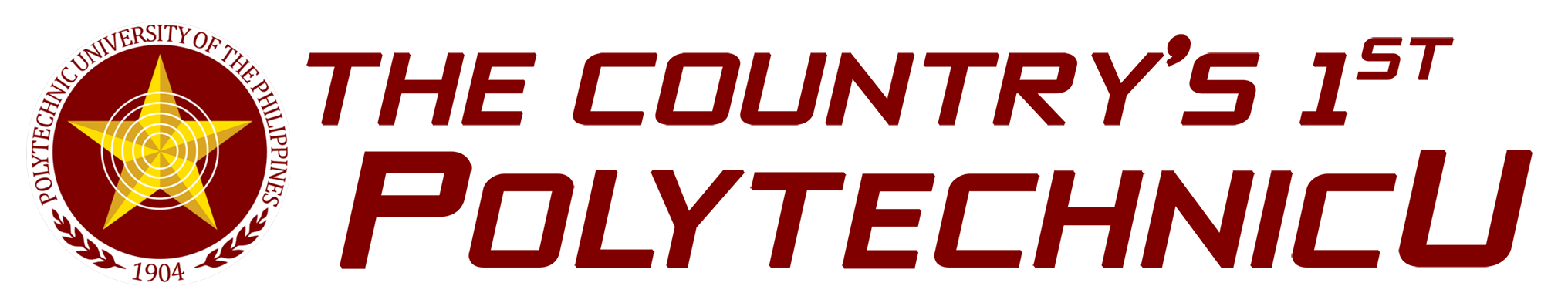

- Location in Luzon Location in the Philippines

Polytechnic University of the Philippines, Ragay Extension or PUP Ragay (Filipino: Politeknikong Unibersidad ng Pilipinas, Sudlong ng Ragay) is a satellite campus of the Polytechnic University of the Philippines located in the municipality of Ragay, Camarines Sur, Bicol Region, Philippines. It is situated atop hill that overlooks the municipality of Ragay.

== Courses ==
College of Accountancy (COA)

- Bachelor of Science in Accountancy (BSA)

College of Business (CB)

- Bachelor in Office Administration (BOA)
- Bachelor of Science in Business Administration (BSBA)

College of Economics, Finance, and Politics (CEFP)

- Bachelor in Public Administration and Governance (BPAG)

College of Computer and Information and Sciences (CCIS)

- Bachelor of Science in Information Technology (BSIT)

College of Education (COED)

- Bachelor in Secondary Education Major in English (BSEd-English)
- Bachelor in Secondary Education Major in Mathematics (BSEd-Math)
- Bachelor in Elementary Education (BEEd)
