= Valderrey =

Coordinates: 42°24′N 6°01′W

- municipality
- Flag Coat of arms
- Interactive map of Valderrey
- Country: Spain
- Autonomous community: Castile and León
- Province: León
- Municipality: Valderrey

Area
  - Total: 60 km^{2} (23 sq mi)

Population (2025-01-01)
  - Total: 424
  - Density: 7.1/km^{2} (18/sq mi)
- Time zone: UTC+1 (CET)
  - Summer (DST): UTC+2 (CEST)

Valderrey (Spanish pronunciation: [baldeˈrej]) is a municipality located in the province of León, Castile and León, Spain. According to the 2018 census (INE), the municipality has a population of 436 inhabitants.

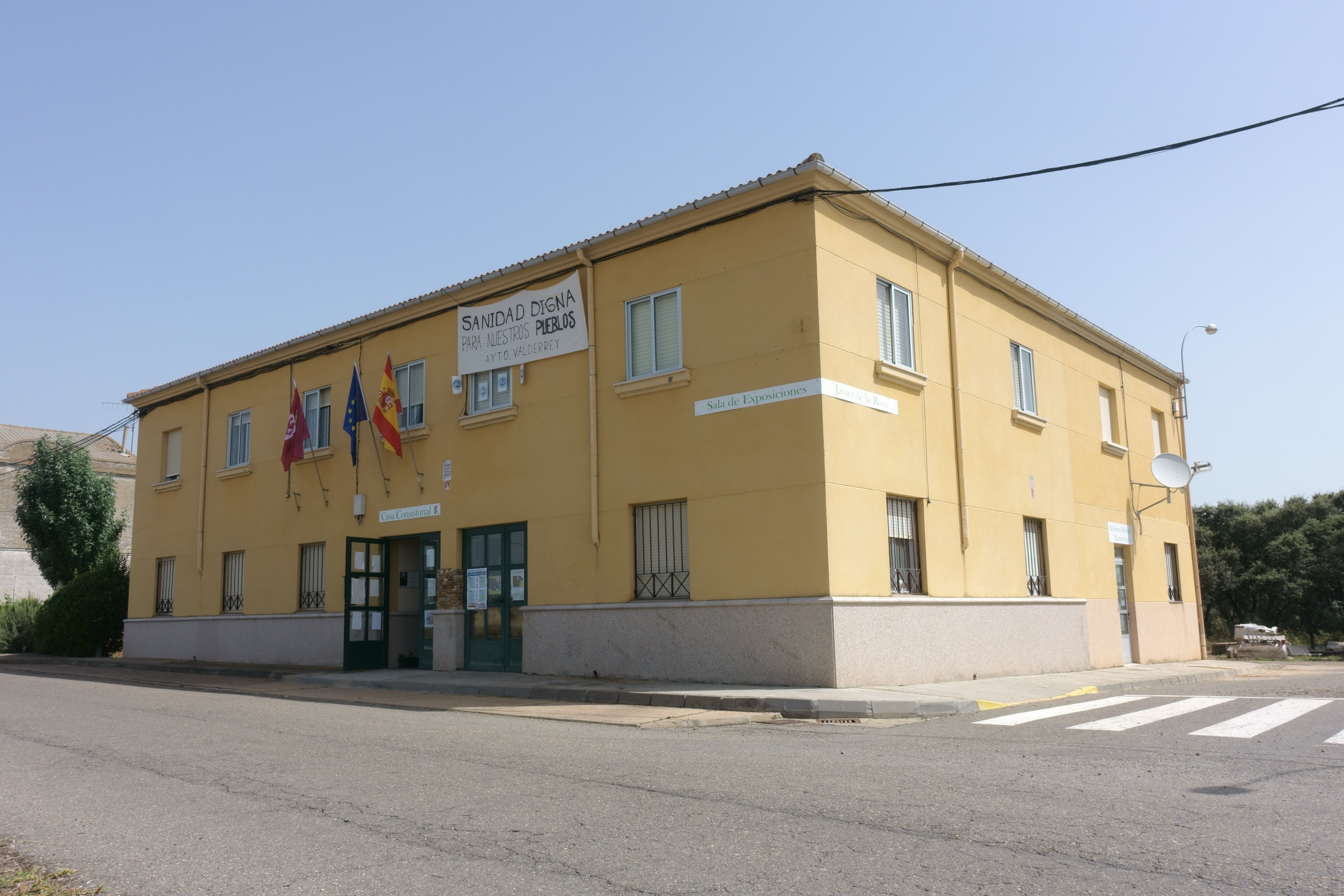
Town Hall of Valderrey
