= UP Writers Club =

Literary organisation at the University of the Philippines Diliman

The UP Writers’ Club is a literary organization at the University of the Philippines Diliman. It was founded in 1927.

The organization has produced Philippine literary artists including 8 National Artists for Literature (Virgilio Almario, Edith Tiempo, Francisco Arcellana, F. Sionil Jose, NVM Gonzales, Jose Garcia Villa, Nick Joaquin, and Bienvenido Lumbera). http://upwritersclub.tumblr.com/
