= Ave Perez Jacob =

Filipino writer

Ave Perez Jacob is a Filipino writer, columnist, literary critic and novelist popular for his socio-political works. He was one of few Tagalog writers who popularized short stories with theme of injustice and tragedy set on the realistic portrayal of poverty during the 1960s. His short story "Guwardiya" won a Palanca Awards in 1975. He is also the author of the novel "Sibol sa mga Guho." Prof. Ave Perez Jacob was honored by the Unyon ng mga Manunulat sa Pilipinas (UMPIL) with "2001 Gawad Pambansang Alagad ni Balagtas" for his socio-realist novels and short stories.

Jacob graduated from Manuel L. Quezon University, and taught language & literature courses at the Polytechnic University of the Philippines. He died in 2015 at the age of 78.
