= Rubén Vega =

Spanish footballer

Personal information
- Full name: Rubén Vega Fuentes
- Date of birth: 24 July 1977 (age 49)
- Place of birth: Castrillo de las Piedras, Spain
- Height: 1.86 m (6 ft 1 in)
- Position: Attacking midfielder

Team information
- Current team: Ponferradina B (coach)

Senior career*
Years	Team	Apps	(Gls)
1995–1997	Real Sociedad B	67	(6)
1997–2000	Real Sociedad	11	(0)
1998–1999	→ Gimnástica (loan)	37	(7)
1999–2000	→ Albacete (loan)	28	(0)
2001	Sevilla	3	(0)
2001–2002	Alavés B	35	(10)
2002–2004	Cultural Leonesa	66	(9)
2004–2012	Ponferradina	233	(54)
Total		490	(86)

Managerial career
- 2014–2018: Ponferradina (assistant)
- 2016: Ponferradina (interim)
- 2018–: Ponferradina B
- * Club domestic league appearances and goals

Rubén Vega Fuentes (born 24 July 1977) is a Spanish former footballer who played as an attacking midfielder, currently manager of SD Ponferradina B.

== Playing career ==
Born in Castrillo de las Piedras, Province of León, Vega's career was spent mainly in the Segunda División B, but he did make 11 La Liga appearances over the course of two seasons, with Real Sociedad. He made his debut in the competition on 31 August 1997, playing the full 90 minutes in a 3–0 away loss against FC Barcelona.

Vega also represented Gimnástica de Torrelavega, Albacete Balompié, Sevilla FC (then in the Segunda División), Deportivo Alavés B, Cultural y Deportiva Leonesa and SD Ponferradina. He promoted twice to the second tier with the latter side, but suffered the subsequent immediate relegations in 2007 and 2011.

== Coaching career ==
Vega retired from football in 2012 at the age of 35, after one year out of football due to a serious hip injury. He stayed connected with his last club, as assistant coach under Manolo Díaz for the 2014–15 campaign.

On 27 April 2016, Vega replaced the dismissed Fabri González at the helm of Ponferradina, on an interim basis. On his professional debut on 1 May, he oversaw a 1–1 second-tier draw at home to Real Zaragoza; four managers over the season were not able to finally prevent relegation.

In June 2018, Vega was appointed at the amateur reserve team.
