= E. San Juan Jr. =

Epifanio San Juan Jr., also known as E. San Juan Jr. (born December 29, 1938, in Santa Cruz, Manila, Philippines), is a well known Filipino American literary academic, Tagalog writer, Filipino poet, civic intellectual, activist, writer, essayist, video/film maker, editor, and poet whose works related to the Filipino Diaspora in English and Filipino writings have been translated into German, Russian, French, Italian, and Chinese. As an author of books on race and cultural studies, he was a "major influence on the academic world". He was the director of the Philippines Cultural Studies Center in Storrs, Connecticut in the United States. In 1999, San Juan received the Centennial Award for Achievement in Literature from the Cultural Center of the Philippines because of his contributions to Filipino and Filipino American Studies.

== Education ==
San Juan received his elementary education in the Philippines at the Bonifacio Elementary School. He took secondary education at Jose Abad Santos High. He graduated as a magna cum laude from the University of the Philippines Diliman in 1958. He received his master's degree in 1962. He obtained a PhD degree from Harvard University in 1965 with the help of a Rockefeller fellowship and Harvard teaching fellowship]. He was a fellow of the Rockefeller Study Center in Triangolo lariano, Italy.

== Career ==
He became a professor of the English language, Comparative Literature, Ethnic Studies, American Studies and Cultural Studies in the United States, Europe, the Philippines, and Taiwan. From 1961 to 1963, San Juan was appointed as a fellow and English-language tutor at Harvard University. Among the other universities in the United States where he taught include the University of California at Davis, the University of Connecticut at Storrs, and the Brooklyn College of the City University of New York. In the Philippines, he taught in the University of the Philippines in 2008, and at the Ateneo de Manila. Other universities include the Bowling Green State University, Wesleyan University, the Universities of Leuven and Antwerp in Belgium, and the National Tsing Hua University in the Republic of China (Taiwan).

From 1998 to June 15, 2001, San Juan was a professor and the chairman of the Department of Comparative American Cultures in Washington State University. He was the executive director of the so-called Working Papers Series when he published essays on Cultural Studies and Ethnic Studies. In 2009, he became a fellow at the W.E.B. Du Bois Institute for African and African American Research of Harvard University. He was also a Fulbright lecturer, fellow, and professor at the Center for the Humanities of Wesleyan University in Connecticut, the Institute for the Advanced Study of the Humanities at the University of Edinburgh, and at the Institute for the Study of Culture and Society in Ohio.

In 2009-2010 he was a fellow of the W.E.B. Du Bois Institute, Harvard University, visiting professor of American Studies in Leuven University, Belgium (2003)and professor of English Comparative Literature, University of the Philippines (2008). Currently (2012=2013) he is a fellow of the Harry Ransom Center, University of Texas, Austin; and director of the Philippines Cultural Studies Center, Storrs, CT, & Washington DC, USA. He was appointed professorial lecturer (2015-2016) in cultural studies, Polytechnic University of the Philippines, Manila, Philippines.

== Works ==
Apart from writing about the Filipino Diaspora, San Juan's works include essays on race, social class, subalternity, and the U.S. Empire. His works were first published in 1954 on the pages of The Collegian New Review. After winning awards, his poems were anthologized in Godkissing Carrion/Selected Poems: 1954-1964 in 1964, in The Exorcism and Other Poems in 1967, and The Ashes of Pedro Abad Santos and Other Poems in 1985. His literary milieu extends to "media pieces" related to the current political landscape, the human rights abuses and extrajudicial killings in the Philippines, racial polity in the United States, social justice, global mechanism of racialization and its impact on immigrant workers of the global South, essays on Marxism, human liberation, and exposés related to the "resurrection" of the "contours" of the American empire.

In 1966, he made translations of Amado V. Hernandez's poetry resulting to the work entitled Rice Grains: Selected Poems of Amado V. Hernandez. In 1975, he introduced the literary writings of Carlos Bulosan, a Filipino labor organizer and writer, resulting to the publication of Carlos Bulosan and the Imagination of the Class Struggle, the first full-length critical assessment of Bulosan's works, which was followed twenty years later by On Becoming Filipino: Selected Writings by Carlos Bulosan and The Cry and the Dedication in 1995. He was also the author of the "first collection in English translation" of the essays written by Georg Lukács, a Hungarian philosopher and founder of the Western Marxist tradition.

In 2007, San Juan authored a book of poems, the Balikbayang Mahal: Passages of Exile. His other works are Racism and Cultural Studies, Working through the Contradictions, In the Wake of Terror, US Imperialism and Revolution in the Philippines, Beyond Postcolonial Theory (1995), and Hegemony and Strategies of Transgression (1998).

Recent books include "In the Wake of Terror: Class, Race, Nation and Ethnicity in the Postmodern World" (Lexington); "Working Through the Contradictions" (Bucknell University Press). "Critique and Social Transformation" (Edwin Mellen Press), "From Globalization to National Liberation" (University of the Philippines Press)."Balikbayang Sinta: E San Juan Reader" (Ateneo U Press), "Critical Interventions: From Joyce and Ibsen to Kingston and C.S. Peirce" (Saarbrücken: Lambert), and "Rizal in Our Time: revised edition" (Anvil). His new volumes of poetry include "Balikbayang Mahal: Passages in Exile,""Sutrang Kayumanggi," "Mahal Magpakailanman," Diwata Babaylan," and "Bukas Luwalhating Kay Ganda"(all available in amazon.com). The UST Publishing House will issue in 2013 his collection "Ulikba at iba pang bagong tula."

== Recognitions ==
During May 1964, he won the Spanish Siglo de Oro Prize after writing a literary review and criticism of the poetry of Gongora. In 1992, San Juan's Racial Formations/Critical Transformations: Articulations of Power in Ethnic and Racial Studies in the United States was awarded the Gustavus Myers Center's Outstanding Book Award for the Study of Human Rights in the United States. In 1993, the same work received the National Book Award in Cultural Studies from the Association for Asian American Studies. The book is regarded as a classic in Ethnic and Asian American Studies. In 1999, San Juan Jr. received the Centennial Award for Achievement in Literature from the Cultural Center of the Philippines. In 2001, San Juan's After Post-colonialism: Remapping Philippines-United States Confrontations won the Gustavus Myers Center for Human Rights's Outstanding Book Award on Human Rights (also known as the Myers Distinguished Book Award). In 2007, San Juan produced the books entitled In the Wake of Terror: Class, Race, Nation, Ethnicity in the Postmodern World, Imperialism and Revolution in the Philippines, Balikbayang Sinta: An E. San Juan Reader, and From Globalization to National Liberation: Essays. San Juan's also received awards from the Association for Asian American Studies, and the Society for the Study of Multi-Ethnic Literatures in the United States.

== Selected works ==
- Rice Grains: Selected Poems of Amado V. Hernandez (1966)
- The Art of Oscar Wilde (1967), reprinted 1978 by Greenwood Press
- The Radical Tradition in Philippine Literature (1970)
- James Joyce and the Craft of Fiction (1972)
- Marxism and Human Liberation: Selected Essays by Georg Lukács (1972)
- Carlos Bulosan and the Imagination of the Class Struggle (1972), reprinted 1975 by Oriole Editions, New York.
- Preface to Pilipino Literature (1972)
- Introduction to Modern Pilipino Literature (1974)
- Poetics: The Imitation of Action (1978)
- Balagtas: Florante/Laura (1978)
- Bulosan: An Introduction with Selections (1983), reprinted several times.
- Toward a People's Literature: Essays in the Dialectics of Praxis and Contradiction in Philippine Writing (1984), reprinted 2006 by the University of the Philippines Press. National Book Award; Catholic Mass Media Award.
- Crisis in the Philippines: The Making of a Revolution (1986)
- Subversions of Desire: Prolegomena to Nick Joaquin (1988)
- Transcending the Hero/Reinventing the Heroic: An Essay on Andre Gide's Theater (1988)
- Ruptures, Schisms, Interventions: Cultural Revolution in the Third World (1988)
- Only by Struggle: Reflections on Philippine Culture, Society and History in a Time of Civil War (1989), reprinted and enlarged in 2002.
- From People to Nation: Essays in Cultural Politics (1990)
- Writing and National Liberation: Selected Essays 1970-1990 (1991)
- Racial Formations/Critical Transformations: Articulations of Power in Ethnic and Racial Studies in the United States (1992). Association of Asian American Studies Book Award; Myers Center Award.
- Reading the West/Writing the East: Studies in Comparative Literature and Culture (1992)
- From the Masses, to the Masses: Third World Literature and Revolution (1994)
- The Smile of the Medusa and Other Fictions (1994)
- Allegories of Resistance (1994)
- On Becoming Filipino: Selected Writings by Carlos Bulosan, edited by E. San Juan Jr. with an introduction (1995)
- The Cry and the Dedication by Carlos Bulosan, edited by E. San Juan Jr. with an introduction (1995)
- Hegemony and Strategies of Transgression: Essays in Cultural Studies and Comparative Literature (1995)
- The Philippine Temptation: Dialectics of Philippines-U.S. Literary Relations (1996)
- Mediations: From a Filipino Perspective (1996)
- History and Form: Selected Essays (1996)
- Rizal: A Re-Interpretation (1997)
- From Exile to Diaspora: Versions of the Filipino Experience in the United States (1998)
- Beyond Post Colonial Theory. New York: Palgrave Macmillan (1998)
- Filipina Insurgency: Writing Against Patriarchy in the Philippines (1999)
- Alay Sa Paglikha ng Bukang-Liwayway (2000), collected poems in Filipino (2000)
- After Postcolonialism: Remapping Philippines-United States Confrontation (2000), Myers Distinguished Book Award
- Racism and Cultural Studies: Critiques of Multiculturalist Ideology and the Politics of Difference. Durham: Duke University Press (2002)
- Spinoza and the Terror of Racism (2002)
- Himagsik (2003), poems and essays in criticism in Filipino
- Tinik Sa Kaluluwa (2003), collected short stories in Filipino
- Working through the Contradictions: From Cultural Theory to Critical Practice (2004)
- Sapagkat Iniibig Kita at iba pang tula (2005), selected poems in Filipino
- On the Presence of Filipinos in the United States, and other Essays (2007)
- Balikbayang Mahal: Passages from Exile (LuLu.com 2007)
- In the Wake of Terror: Race, Nation, Class in the Field of Global Capital (Lexington 2007)
- "Salud Alabare, Babaeng Mandirigma" (University of San Agustin Publishing House, 2007)
- Imperialism and Revolution in the Philippines (Palgrave Macmillan 2007)
- Balikbayang Sinta: An E. San Juan Reader (Ateneo University Press 2007)
- From Globalization to National Liberation: Essays (University of the Philippines Press 2008)
- Toward Filipino Self-Determination, Beyond Transnational Globalization (SUNY/ State University of New York Press 2009)
- Critique and Social Transformation: Lessons from Antonio Gramsci, Mikhail Bakhtin and Raymond Williams (New York: The Edwin Mellen Press, 2009)
- Critical Interventions: From Joyce and Ibsen to C.S. Peirce and Maxine Hong Kingston (Saarbrücken: Lambert Academic Publishing House, 2010)
- "Sutrang Kayumanggi: Poems in Filipino and English" (Philippines Cultural Studies Center, 2010)
- Rizal in Our Time (revised edition) Anvil Publishing Inc.
- Bukas Luwalhating Kay Ganda (Philippines Cultural Studies Center 2013)
- Ulikba at iba pang bagong tula University of Santos Tomas Publishing House (2013)
- "Mendiola Masker: Mga Tulang Konseptuwal at Post-Konseptuwal" (Philippine Cultural Studies Center, 2014)
- "Kundiman sa Gitna ng Karimlan: University of the Philippines Press (2014)
- "AMBIL: Mga pagsubok, pahiwatig & interbensiyon" Philippines Cultural Studies Center (2014)
- "Tao Te Ching in Filipino/Landas & Kapangyarihan sa Makabuluhang Buhay" (Createspace, 2015)
- Between Empire and Insurgency: The Philippines in the New Millennium" University of the Philippines Press (2015)
- "Lupang Hinirang, Lupang Tinubuan" Mga Panunuri sa Panitikang Filipino. De La Salle University Publishing House (2015)
- "Learning from the Filipino Diaspora:" (University of Santo Tomas Publishing House, 2016)
- "Filipinas Everywhere" (De la Salle University Publishing House, 2016)
- "Wala:Tula & Akda ({Polytechnic University of the Philippines, 2017)
- "The Philippines is in the Heart: Stories by Carlos Bulosan" (New edition, Ateneo University Press, 2017).
- "Carlos Bulosan Revolutionary Filipino Writer in the United States: A Critical Appraisal (New York: Peter Lang, 2017)
- "Racism and the Filipino Diaspora: Essays in Cultural Politics" (Naga, Camarines: Ateneo de Naga University Press, 2018)
- WALA Akda ni E. San Juan, Jr. (Philippines Studies Center, Washington DC 2018).
- "Kontra-Modernidad" (Quezon City: University of the Philippines Press, 2019).
- "Bakas Alingawngaw (Quezon City: Ateneo University Press, 2020).
- "Faustino Aguilar: Kapangyarihan, Kamalayan, Kasaysayan, Metakomentaryo sa mga Nobels ni Faustino Aguilar (Manila: University of * —→→Santo Tomas Publishing House, 2020).
