= Jesus T. Peralta =

Jesus Tamayo Peralta (born December 26, 1932, in Ft. William McKinley) is a painter, photographer, graphic artist, poet, anthropologist/archaeologist, essayist, and is also one of the prizewinning playwrights in the Philippines.

He burst into the literary scene dramatically by winning first prize in the two play-writing contest in the same year (1957) in the Arena Theater Playwriting Contest for the Other Son (My Brother's Keeper) and in the Palanca Memorial Awards One-Act Play Contest for the Play, The Judas. Two Years (1959) he was to write another first prize for Somnambulists in the Philippine Mental Health Association playwriting contest.

He earned university degrees from the University of Santo Tomas (Manila), the University of the Philippines and finally earning his doctorate from the University of California, Davis. He taught a year at Letran and then decided to join the National Museum as a museum curator and assistant director. He has participated in many literature, art, archeology, social science and cultural workshops and conferences including the writer's workshop in Silliman University, the writer's workshop at the University of Iowa, US. He has contributed much to the cultural facet of the Philippines by being a consultant in restoration project in Intramuros, the chairperson of the Intra-ASEAN project in Butuan City and a commissioner in the UNESCO National Commission of the Philippines.

A Bachelor of Philosophy graduate from the University of Santo Tomas, with a Master of Arts in Anthropology from the University of the Philippines, and a Doctor of Philosophy in Anthropology from the University of California, Davis Campus, Jesus T. Peralta was Director III of the National Museum until he retired in 1997. Presently, he is a Consultant of the National Commission for Culture and the Arts (NCCA). He is the Program Director of the UNESCO project in conserving the Ifugao Epic Chant, the hudhud, which was declared an Intangible Heritage of Humanity, and member of the Intangible Heritage Committee of the NCCA (IHC/NCCA).

Among the recognition he has earned are: the 1967 Leader and Specialist from the State Department of USA in the field of Theatre; a Ford Foundation grant for graduate studies in 1872; the 1965 Golden Santo Nino Award for Cultural Contributions in the country; Outstanding Alumnus in the field of Literature from the Colegio de San Juan de Letran; 1964; Award of Merit in the field of Literature from the University of Santo Tomas; Meritorious Honor Award from the National Museum, and Civil Service Commission; and a 1985 Outstanding Professional Award in the field of Literature and Anthropology from Letran College. He is a Gawad Bantayog ng Museo awardee in 1993 and in 2001, received the Dangal ng Haraya award for lifetime achievements in cultural conservation from the National Commission for Culture and the Arts. He was awarded the Pambansang Alagad ni Balagtas by the Union ng Manunulat ng Pilipinas (UMPIL- Writers Union of the Philippines) on 31 August 2001 and four days later on September 3, he was awarded by the Manila Critics Circle as editor of the Best Anthology for the book, "Reflections on Philippine Culture and Society"; Rubi Awards for Arts and Culture, by the University of Santo Tomas, 2004; and Most Distinguished Alumnus, Colegio Awards, by Colegio de San Juan the Letran, 2005. On 24 June he was awarded the Úlirang Ama Award by the Ulirang Ina/Ama Foundation.

He is a ten-time winner in the Carlos Palanca Memorial Awards in Literature in the field of playwrighting, with similar awards from the Cultural Center of the Philippines, the University of the Philippines, and the Rockefeller Foundation through the Arena Theatre, and others. In 1995 he was elevated to the Hall of Fame of the Carlos Palanca Memorial Awards in Literature.

He is one of the senior members of the Art Critics Association of the Philippines (ACAP). In the 1950s, he painted with the "Primitives" art group.

He was formerly division head of Anthropology and Archaeology from 1974 before he became Director III of the National Museum in 1992; Director of the Sub-Centre for Prehistory of the SEAMEO Projects in Archaeology and Fine Arts (SPAFA) from 1978 to 1987; member of the Archaeology Institute of America; Archaeological Consultant of the Intramuros Restoration; Commissioner in the Cultural Committee until 1988, and the Social Science Committee of the Unesco National Commission until 1990; lecturer at the Foreign Service Institute of the Department of Foreign Affairs. He headed a number of Philippine delegations to international conferences. He was past Vice President of the Southeast Asian Association of Prehistorians based in Jakarta. He has written more than 120 scientific papers and books in the field of Anthropology, Archaeology and general culture.

He is married to Rosario Bitanga, the noted abstract painter/sculptor, and has three sons: Samuel, Francis Paul and Patrick Ian who are the fields of Physics, Chemical Engineering and Mass Communication, respectively.

== Works ==
Peralta's plays have been included in several anthologies such as the Don Carlos Palanca Memorial Awards anthologies, PETA (Philippine Educational Theater Association), Outstanding Filipino Short Plays (Alberto Florentino, 1961), and the Arena Theater of the Philippines collections.

As an eminent anthropologist, Peralta has published a number of essays and articles in such journals like the "ASPAC Quarterly", "Pamana", "Kultura, The Philippine Quarterly", "Archipelago", "Archeology" (Archaeology Institute of America), "Solidarity", and "National Museum Papers"

His scientific books include "Pre-Spanish Manila: A Reconstruction of the Prehistory of Manila" (1974), "The Philippine Lithic Tradition, No. 8" (1978) and "I'wak: Alternative Strategies for Subsistence: A Micro-Economic Study of the I'Wak of Boyasyas, Nueva Vizcaya, No. 11" (1978, Glimpses- Peoples of the Philippines, Glances- Prehistory of the Philippines, Tinge of Red -Prehistoric Art of the Philippines, Philippine Ethnic Design Patterns, and others.

== Achievements ==
Don Carlos Palanca Memorial Awards

- "Play the Judas" (First Prize, One-Act Play, 1957)
- "Scent of Fear" (Third Prize, One-Act Play, 1959)
- "Longer than Mourning" (First Prize, One-Act Play, 1961)
- "The Mouth is an Open Wound" (Second Prize, One-Act Play, 1965)
- "The Sign of the Sea Gulls" (First Prize, One-Act Play, 1966)
- "Voices of Laughter" (Second Prize, One-Act Play, 1967)
- "Days of the Clock" (Second Prize, One-Act Play 1969)
- "Age of Prometheus" (Second Prize, One-Act Play, 1971)
- "Grave for Blue Flowers" (First Prize, One-Act Play, 1972)
- "Exit No Exit" (First Prize, Full-Length Play, 1978)

Hall of Fame (1995)

Arena Theatre/Rockefeller Foundation

- "The Other Son" (First Prize, ONe-Act Play, 1957)

CCP Literary Contest

- "Green is Blue on Clowns and Puppets" (Honorable Mention, Three Act Play, 1971)

University of the Philippines

- "Via Estrada" (Second Prize. Three Act Play)
