= Kerima Polotan Tuvera =

Filipino fiction writer, essayist and journalist

- Keirma Polotan-Tuvera in October 1973
- Born: Kerima Polotan; December 16, 1925; Jolo, Sulu, Insular Government of the Philippine Islands, U.S.
- Died: August 19, 2011 (aged 85); Manila, Philippines
- Resting place: Manila Memorial Park – Sucat
- Other name: Patricia S. Torres
- Occupations: Fictional writer essayist journalist
- Years active: 1966–2010
- Spouse: Juan Capiendo Tuvera
- Children: 10

Kerima Polotan-Tuvera (December 16, 1925 – August 19, 2011) was a Filipino fiction writer, essayist, and journalist. Some of her stories were published under the pseudonym "Patricia S. Torres".

== Personal life ==
Born in Jolo, Sulu, she was christened Putli Kerima. Her father was an army colonel, and her mother taught home economics. Due to her father's frequent transfers in assignment, she lived in various places and studied in the public schools of Pangasinan, Tarlac, Laguna, Nueva Ecija and Rizal.

She graduated from the Far Eastern University Girls' High School. In 1944, she enrolled in the University of the Philippines School of Nursing, but the Battle of Manila put a halt to her studies. In 1945, she transferred schools to Arellano University, where she attended the writing classes of Teodoro M. Locsin and edited the first issue of the Arellano Literary Review. She worked with Your Magazine, This Week and the Junior Red Cross Magazine.

In 1949, she married newsman Juan Capiendo Tuvera, a childhood friend and fellow writer, with whom she had 10 children, among them the fictionist Katrina Tuvera.

== Writings during the Martial Law years ==
Between the years 1966 and 1986, her husband served as the executive assistant and speechwriter of then-President Ferdinand Marcos. Her husband's work drew her into the charmed circle of the Marcoses. It was during this time (1969) that Polotan-Tuvera penned the only officially approved biography of the First Lady Imelda Marcos, Imelda Romualdez Marcos: a biography of the First Lady of the Philippines.

During the years of martial law in the Philippines, she founded and edited the officially approved FOCUS Magazine, as well as the Evening Post newspaper.

== Works and awards ==
Her 1952 short story, (the widely anthologized) The Virgin, won two first prizes: of the Philippines Free Press Literary Awards and of the Palanca Awards. In 1957, she edited an anthology for the Don Carlos Palanca Memorial Awards for Literature, with English and Tagalog prize-winning short stories from 1951 to 1952. Her short stories “The Trap” (1956), “The Giants” (1959), “The Tourists” (1960), “The Sounds of Sunday” (1961) and “A Various Season” (1966) all won the first prize of the Palanca Awards.

In 1966, she published Stories, a collection of eleven stories. In 1970, alongside writing the biography of Imelda Marcos, Polotan-Tuvera collected forty-two of her hard-hitting essays during her years as a staff writer of the Philippines Free Press and published them under the title Author's Circle. In 1976, she edited the four-volume Anthology of Don Palanca Memorial Award Winners. In 1977, she published another collection of thirty-five essays, Adventures in a Forgotten Country. In the late 1990s, the University of the Philippines Press republished all of her major works.

The 1961 Stonehill Award was bestowed on Polotan-Tuvera, for her novel The Hand of the Enemy. In 1963, she received the Republic Cultural Heritage Award, an award discontinued in 2003 but was then considered the government’s highest form of recognition for artists at the time. The city of Manila conferred on Polotan-Tuvera its Patnubay ng Sining at Kalinangan Award, in recognition of her contributions to its intellectual and cultural life.

== Death ==
Polotan-Tuvera died at 85, after a lingering illness. She suffered a stroke and used a wheelchair for the last months of her life. The wake was held at Funeraria Paz Sucat, within Manila Memorial Park.

National Artist for Literature Edith L. Tiempo, a close friend of Polotan-Tuvera died two days after, prompting a grieving among the nation's writers. The Malacañan Palace through Presidential Spokesperson Edwin Lacierda issued a statement: "The Aquino administration is united in grief with a country that mourns their passing." The official statement recognized Polotan-Tuvera's body of work as "crucial to the development of Philippine Literary Fiction written from English" and cited Polotan-Tuvera's influence on "generations of writers."

Rina Jimenez-David of the Philippine Daily Inquirer described her short stories and novels as "unsentimental and clear-eyed depictions of heartbreak and disillusion. But her writing was dazzling and unflinching in its honesty."

In the eulogy for Polotan-Tuvera, fellow Palanca-winning writer and friend Rony Diaz said, "The number of books that she has written doesn’t really matter because all of them contain stories and essays of compelling beauty and profound wisdom."

Polotan-Tuvera is survived by her ten children and nineteen grandchildren.
