= Efren Abueg =

Filipino creative writer, editor, author, novelist

- Born: Efren Reyes Abueg; 3 March 1937 (age 89); Tanza, Cavite, Commonwealth of the Philippines

Efren Reyes Abueg is a well-known and recognized Filipino-language creative writer, editor, author, novelist, short story writer, essayist, fictionist, professor, textbook writer, and anthologist in the Philippines. His works appeared on magazines such as Liwayway, Bulaklak, Tagumpay, Mod, and Homelife.

== Personal life ==
He attended Naic Elementary School in Naic, Cavite in 1950. In 1954, he finished high school at Arellano (Public) High School in Batangas. He graduated in 1957 from Imus Institute Junior College in Imus, Cavite with an Associate In Arts degree and graduated with the degree of Bachelor in Science in Commerce, Major in Accounting in 1960 from Manuel L. Quezon University in Quiapo, Manila. He got his Masters in Arts in Language and Literature degree at De La Salle University in 1987 and his PhD in Filipino and Translation Studies at the University of the Philippines Diliman in 2000.

== Writing career ==
Abueg was the author of three anthologies of stories and essays. They are Bugso ("Impetus"), Tradisyon (Kasaysayan ng Panitikan ng Pilipinas: Mula Alamat hanggang Edsa) ["Tradition (History of Literature of the Philippines: From Legendary to Edsa"), and Ang Mangingisda: Mga Kuwento kay Jesus ["The Fisherman: Stories on Jesus"). Abueg authored the novels Dilim sa Umaga ("Darkness in the Morning"), Habagat sa Lupa ("Monsoon on Land"), Ang Babaing Iyon ("That Woman"), and Dugo sa Kayumangging Lupa ("Blood on Brown Land"). of Merah Tua, a novel cerealize in Liwayway magazine. He was one of the resident writers at the Bienvenido N. Santos Creative Writing Center.

From 1998 to 1999, Abueg was a National Fellow for Fiction for the LIKHAAN: UP Creative Writing Center. Among the books Abueg edited were Mga Piling Akda ng KADIPAN ["Selected Works of KADIPAN"] (1964), Mga Agos sa Disyerto ["Currents in the Desert"] (1965, 1974 and 1993), MANUNULAT: Mga Piling Akdang Pilipino ["WRITER: Selected Filipino Works"] (1970), and Parnasong Tagalog ni Abadilla (1973). He was the editor of Tulay na Buhangin at iba pang mga akda ["Sand Bridge at other works"].

== Teaching career ==
Abueg was a language and literature professor. From 1965 to 1972, Abueg taught at the Manuel L. Quezon University. From 1971 to 1979, Abueg taught at the Philippine College of Commerce. From 1974 to 1977, Abueg taught at the Pamantasan ng Lungsod ng Maynila. From 1977 to 1978, Abueg taught at the Ateneo de Manila University. He was also a professor at the De La Salle University.

From 1984 to 1987, Abueg was the Director of the Student Publications Office of De La Salle University. From 1986 to 1988, Abueg was the president of the Kapisanan ng mga Propesor ng Pilipino (KAPPIL) [literally "Organization of Professors of the Filipino Language"), as well as the president of Linangan ng Literatura ng Pilipinas (Literary League of the Philippines). He was also the director of the Philippine Folklore Society.

== Awards ==
Liwayway magazine awarded Abueg four literature prizes for his novels, such as in 1964, 1965, and 1967. Abueg had been a recipient of awards for his short stories. The recognition included six Carlos Palanca Memorial Awards, namely in 1959, 1960, 1963, 1964, 1967, and 1974. In 1957, Abueg received the first prize for short story from KADIPAN. In 1969, he received the Pang-alaalang Gawad Balagtas (Balagtas Memorial Award). In 1969, the Philippines Free Press gave him a third prize for a Filipino-language short story. In 1992, Abueg won the Mangangatha sa Tagalog ("Composer in Tagalog") prize from the Unyon ng mga Manunulat sa Pilipinas.

For essay writing, Abueg received the first prize during the KADIPAN competition in 1958. Abueg received awards for the textbooks he authored. The other awards Abueg received include the Gawad Pambansang Alagad ni Balagtas and the Gawad Quezon sa Panitikan.

== Works by Abueg ==
=== Poems ===
- Muling Pagsilang ng Isang Pangarap (1964)
- Dugo sa Kayumangging Lupa (1965)
- Alimpuyo (1967)
- Dilim sa Umaga (1968)
- Malamig na Ningas (1968)
- Agaw-dilim (1969)
- Mga Kaluluwa sa Kumunoy (1972)
- Mister Mo, Lover Boy Ko (1973)
- Maraming Lalaki sa Mundo (1984)
- Huwag Mong Sakyan ang Buhawi (1985)
- Mga Haliging Inaanay (1987)
- Aawitin Ko ang Pag-ibig Mo (1992)

=== Short stories ===
- Si Mark at ako
- Ang Bagong Paraiso (2011)
- Ang Kamatayan ni Tiyo Samuel
- Mapanglaw ang Mukha ng Buwan
- Ang Saranggola
- Kanayon
- Saranggola (1969)
- Bulaklak (1969)

== See also ==
- Gilda Olvidado
- Soledad Reyes
