= Rogelio R. Sikat =

Filipino writer (1940–1997)

Rogelio Sicat
- Born: Rogelio R. Sicat; June 26, 1940; San Isidro, Nueva Ecija, Commonwealth of the Philippines
- Died: 1997 (aged 56–57); Manila, Philippines
- Education: University of Santo Tomas
- Occupations: Novelist, writer
- Writing career
- Pen name: Rogelio Sikat
- Period: 1950-1970
- Genre: sociocultural background of the Philippines
- Subjects: social issues and land reform
- Movement: Agos

Rogelio Sicat (June 26, 1940 – 1997), sometimes referred to as "Rogelio Sikat", was a prolific Filipino novelist, playwright and short story writer. Sikat is best known for his classic masterpieces particularly "Impeng Negro", a short story based on a half-black, half-Filipino boy and Moses, Moses, a play in one act that depicts the social injustices and the abuse of the country's oppressive politicians. He uses "Sikat" as a pen name to reflect on his Filipino identity (The Filipino alphabet originally does not have the letter c) as his real surname is "Sicat".

Apart from being one of the Philippines’ finest modern literary figures, Sikat was also a distinguished educator. He was a former university professor and former college dean of the University of the Philippines’ College of Arts and Letters.

Sikat was born on June 26, 1940, in the town of San Isidro in the province of Nueva Ecija, as the sixth of eight children of Estanislao Sikat and Crisanta Rodriguez. For his college education, Sikat went to Manila to study in the University of Santo Tomas.

During his time at UST, Sikat served as a writer for the university's official newspaper, The Varsitarian. Sikat's love for literature further heightened and his writing skills flourished with his stint with The Varsitarian.

After finishing his Bachelor of Arts in Journalism, Sikat continued his love for writing. Despite the country's love for western culture, Sikat took the path less traveled and wrote and succeeded with the Filipino language.

In 1962, Sikat's "Impeng Negro" won the first prize in Liwayway magazine's best short story and the prized Carlos Palanca Award both in the same year. It catapulted Sikat into the upper echelons of Philippine literature. "Impeng Negro" touches critical social issues including racism and bullying.

"Impeng Negro" was adapted into a short film entitled, Impen, the Negro. The short 30-minute film won 1st prize in the Short Feature Film Category in the 12th Gawad CCP for alternative film and video.

Sikat wrote several other short stories during his lifetime including "Tata Selo", a fictional narrative based on the real-life land reform issues and recurring political cruelties in the Philippines. It won the second prize in the Carlos Palanca Award for 1963. It was later adapted for the 2014 anthology film Tres.

In 1969, Sikat's socio-critical play Moses, Moses won the Carlos Palanca Award, further solidifying Sikat's position among the titans of Philippine literature.

Sikat worked in the newspaper and magazine industry, serving as a feature writer for the long-running Liwayway magazine.
