= Wilfrido Nolledo =

Filipino writer (1933–2004)

Wilfrido D. Nolledo
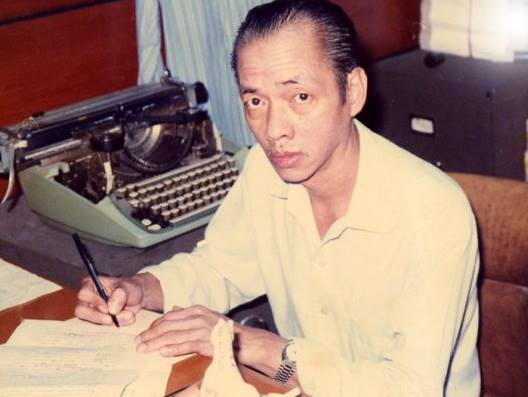
- Born: Wilfrido Dayo Nolledo; January 19, 1933; Manila, Philippines
- Died: March 6, 2004 (aged 71); Los Angeles, California, United States
- Education: University of Santo Tomas; University of Iowa
- Occupations: Novelist; short story writer; playwright; screenwriter; journalist
- Writing career
- Genres: Literary fiction, magic realism
- Notable work: But for the Lovers (1970)

Wilfrido Dayo Nolledo (January 19, 1933 – March 6, 2004) was a Filipino novelist, short story writer, playwright, screenwriter, and journalist. He is best known for his novel But for the Lovers (1970), set during the Japanese occupation of the Philippines.

== Biography ==
Nolledo was born in Manila, Philippines. He studied journalism at the University of Santo Tomas and later attended the Iowa Writers' Workshop, on a Fulbright scholarship. During this time, he also served as the fiction editor of The Iowa Review.

He began his literary career in the 1950s and received several Palanca Awards. He also wrote for the Philippines Free Press.

== Works ==
=== Novel ===
- But for the Lovers (1970)
- Sangria Tomorrow (1981)
- Vaya Con Virgo (1984)

=== Short stories ===
- In Caress of Beloved Faces (1960)
- Adios, Ossimandas (1961)
- Rice Wine (1962)
- Cadena de Amor and Other Stories (2004)

=== Plays ===
- Island of the Heart (one-act play; 1956)
- Legend of the Filipino Guitar (one-act play; 1958)
- Amour Impossible (one-act play; 1961)
- Turn Red the Sea (one-act play; 1963)
- Rise, Terraces (one-act play; 1964)
- Flores Para Los Muertos (one-act play; 1966)
- Dulce Estranjera (one-act play; 1974)
- The Terrorist Dialogue (1977)

== Reception ==
Nolledo's work has been noted for its complex narrative style and lyrical prose. His novel But for the Lovers received critical attention in both the Philippines and internationally, including reviews in The New York Times Book Review.
