= List of University of the East people =

The University of the East (UE; Filipino: Pamantasan ng Silangan) is a private university located in Manila, Philippines. It was founded in 1946. The following is a list of notable people associated with the University of the East.

== Alumni ==
=== Academia ===
Name	Class	Notability	Ref.
Nassef Manabilang Adiong	B.A. 2006	Professor at the University of the Philippines Asian Center	
Alfredo E. Evangelista	1953	Director of the Anthropology Division of the National Museum of the Philippines.	
Raquel Fortun	MD	Professor at the College of Medicine of the University of the Philippines Manila and chairperson of the Department of Pathology	
Carmen Lamagna	MA 1995	Vice-Chancellor of American International University-Bangladesh	
Ruth Elynia Mabanglo	BA 1969	Professor at the University of Hawaii at Manoa	
Thomas H. Tietenberg	MA 1965	Economist, environmentalist, and emeritus professor at Colby College	

=== Art ===
Name	Class	Notability	Ref.
Romulo Galicano		Painter	
Erwin Mallari	BFA 2002	Watercolor artist	
Fernando Sena	BFA 1971	Painter, considered the "father of the Philippine art workshop"	
Epitacio Tongohan		Artist, poet, and filmmaker; has been called the "Father of Visual Poetry"	

=== Business ===
Name	Class	Notability	Ref.
Antonio Cabangon-Chua	BS 1956	Chairman of the ALC Group of Companies, including Aliw Broadcasting Corporation and Radio Philippines Network; Philippine ambassador to Laos	
Domingo Itchon		Business executive and second president of the Philippine Basketball Association	
Junie Morosi		Director of Wyuna Community Inc.	
Andrew Tan		Chairman-President of Megaworld Corporation, Marriott International Manila, Empire East Holdings, Golden Arches Development Corporation-McDonald's Philippines, and Emperador Distillers Incorporation	

=== Entertainment ===
Name	Class	Notability	Ref.
Jimmy Bondoc	LL.B. 2023	Musician and songwriter; member of the Board of Directors of Philippine Amusement and Gaming Corporation	
Awra Briguela		Actor and comedian	
Lito Calzado		Actor, director, and choreographer	
George Canseco	AB Journalism	Song composer, musical director for films	
Rez Cortez	BS	Film and television actor and assistant director.	
Roland Dantes		Actor and Filipino martial artist	
Charlie Davao		Actor known for roles in film and television	
Eva Eugenio		Singer	
Nonoy Froilan	1971	Dancer, choreographer, and actor	
Claire dela Fuente		Singer	
Joey Gosiengfiao		Movie director	
Joaquin Henson		PBA commentator, sports columnist, and broadcaster	
Christopher de Leon		Actor and board member of the 2nd district of Batangas	
Xian Lim		Actor and television host	
Ricky Lo	AB	TV host, newspaper columnist	
Pen Medina	non-degreed	Actor	
Peter Musñgi	1972	Voice-over artist in radio, television, film, and new media, and COO of ABS-CBN Corporation	
Imelda Papin		Singer and vice governor of Camarines Sur	
Fernando Poe Jr.	H.S. 2 year	Actor	
Janina San Miguel		2008 Binibining Pilipinas World winner, Ford Supermodel of the World-Philippines 2009 runner-up	
Charito Solis		Film and television actress	
Lucita Soriano	non-degreed	Actress	
Nene Tamayo		Winner of Pinoy Big Brother Season 1 on ABS-CBN	
Tats Faustino		Musical composer, arranger, and producer	
Ramon Tulfo	College of Law	TV host	

=== Law ===
Name	Class	Notability	Ref.
Persida Acosta	B.S., LL.B	Chief Public Attorney of the Philippines	
Marian Aleido	LL.B. 1979	Judge Advocate General of the Armed Forces of the Philippines	
Lucas Bersamin	LL.B. 1973	25th Chief Justice, Supreme Court of the Philippines, associate justice of the Philippine Court of Appeals	
Japar Dimaampao	B.S. 1982, LL.B. 1987	Associate justice of the Supreme Court of the Philippines	
Fernanda Lampas-Peralta		Presiding Justice of the Court of Appeals of the Philippines	
Dante Tiñga	LL.B., 1960	Associate justice of the Supreme Court of the Philippines, House of Representatives of the Philippines, dean of the University of the East College of Law, dean of the College of Law of the Polytechnic University of the Philippines.	
Ferdinand Topacio	LL.B 1992	Legal counsel for Mike Arroyo, managing partner of the Topacio Law Office	

=== Literature ===
Name	Class	Notability	Ref.
Virgilio S. Almario		Author and poet	
Teo Antonio		Poet	
Mike Bigornia		Poet, fictionist, editor, and translator	
Martha Cecilia		Author of Tagalog romance novels in the Philippines	
Adrian Cristobal	non-degreed	Writer and newspaper columnist	
Rogelio Mangahas	AB	Poet, spearheaded the second successful modernist movement in Filipino poetry	

=== Politics ===
Name	Class	Notability	Ref.
Hussin Ututalum Amin	LL.B. 1978	House of Representatives of the Philippines	
Arthur Angara		Mayor of Baler, Aurora; National Deputy Secretary-General of the League of Municipalities of the Philippines	
Karen Angara-Ularan	BSC 1992	Vice Mayor of Baler, Aurora; member of the Aurora Provincial Board	
Ronaldo Aquino		Mayor of Calbayog	
Jose Fabian Cadiz	M.D.	Vice Mayor of Marikina and Marikina City Council; physician	
Marc Douglas Cagas IV	LL.B 2004	House of Representatives of the Philippines, Governor of Davao del Sur, and Vice Governor of Davao del Sur	
Noli de Castro	BSBA 1971	Vice President of the Philipinnes, Senate of the Philippines; ABS-CBN broadcaster	
Aurora E. Cerilles		House of Representatives of the Philippines, Governor of Zamboanga del Sur	
Raul Daza		House of Representatives of the Philippines	
Howard Dee	BBA 1951,	Philippine ambassador to the Holy See and Malta	
Gilberto Duavit Sr.	B.A., LL.M	Philippine House of Representatives, Interim Batasang Pambansa, and founder and chairman of GMA Network	
Dette Escudero	Business Administration	House of Representatives of the Philippines	
Daniel Fernando	B.S.	Governor of Bulacan, Vice Governor of Bulacan, Bulacan Provincial Board; film and television actor	
Antonio Ferrer	LL.B	House of Representatives of the Philippines, Mayor of General Trias	
Josie Fitial		First Lady of the Northern Mariana Islands	
Virgilio Garcillano	LL.B 1960	Commissioner of the Commission on Elections	
Edward Hagedorn		House of Representatives of the Philippines, mayor of Puerto Princesa	
Chen Hung-chang		Member of the Legislative Yuan of Taiwan	
Robert Jaworski		Senate of the Philippines; professional basketball player and head coach with the Philippine Basketball Association; PBA's 25 Greatest	
Robert Jaworski Jr.		House of Representatives of the Philippines, Vice Mayor of Pasig, professional basketball player	
Antonio Manuel Lagdameo	B.A. 1964	Ambassador of the Philippines to the United Kingdom, Ambassador of the Philippines to Mexico, Ambassador of the Philippines to Spain, Permanent Representative of the Philippines to the United Nations	
Alfredo Lim	BSBA 1951, LLB 1963	Senate of the Philippines, House of Representatives of the Philippines, Mayor of Manila, Secretary of the Department of Interior and Local Government, and Director of the National Bureau of Investigation	
Diosdado Macapagal	LL.D 1957 (honorary)	President of the Philippines and CBA professor	
Ramon Magsaysay	LL.D 1957 (honorary)	President of the Philippines	
Ayong Maliksi		House of Representatives of the Philippines, Governor of Cavite	
Rodante Marcoleta	MBA	Senate of the Philippines, House of Representatives of the Philippines; arrested for plunder of campaign funds	
Ferdinand Marcos	LL.D 1967 (honorary)	President of the Philippines	
Rizalino Navarro	BS	Secretary of Trade and Industry; Chairman of Rizal Commercial Banking Corporation	
Jovito Palparan	B.S. 1971	House of Representatives of the Philippines, Philippine Army general, and convicted criminal	
Eliseo Rio Jr.		Undersecretary for Operations of the Philippines' Department of Information and Communications Technology; Secretary of Information and Communications Technology; Commissioner of National Telecommunications Commission	
Armando Sanchez		Governor of Batangas, mayor of Santo Tomas, Batangas	
Lorna Silverio		House of Representatives of the Philippines, mayor of San Rafael, Bulacan	
Augusto L. Syjuco		House of Representatives of the Philippines and director-general of the Technical Education and Skills Development Authority	
Rolando Toledo	BS 1984	Secretary of Budget and Management	
Erwin Tulfo		Senate of the Philippines, House of Representatives of the Philippines,	
Paulyn Ubial		Secretary of Health (Philippines)	
Felixberto Urbiztondo		Mayor of Barobo	f
Leopoldo Vega	MD 1972	Undersecretary for Special Concerns of the Department of Health; physician	

=== Sports ===
Name	Class	Notability	Ref.
Judith Abil		Professional volleyball player	
Tisha Abundo	B.S.	volleyball player who served as Philippine Sports Commissioner from 1998 to 2001	
Shaya Adorador		Professional volleyball player	
Fernando Alvarez		Association footballer, sports executive, and FIFA International referee	
Kath Arado		Member of the Philippine Women's National Volleyball Team	
Fitch Arboleda		Professional footballer	
Marcy Arellano		Professional basketball player	
Paul Artadi		Professional basketball player and San Juan City councilor	
Laizah Bendong		Professional basketball player	
Mark Borboran		Professional basketball player	
Allan Caidic		Professional basketball player; PBA's 25 Greatest	
Edward Camposano		Professional volleyball player	
Niño Canaleta		Professional basketball player	
Nat Canson		Professional basketball player and coach	
Jerry Codiñera		Professional basketball player, PBA's 25 Greatest	
Mike Cortez		Professional basketball player and coach	
Mar Diano		Professional footballer	
Rudy Distrito		Professional basketball player	
Elmer Espiritu		Professional basketball player	
Bong Galanza		Professional basketball player	
Paolo Hubalde		Professional basketball player	
Lloyd Josafat		Professional volleyball player	
Robert Jaworski		Professional basketball player and head coach with the Philippine Basketball Association; PBA's 25 Greatest; Senate of the Philippines	
Vangie de Jesus		Captain of the Philippines women's national volleyball team	
Rob Labagala		Professional basketball player and coach	
Paul Lee		Professional basketball player	
Alberto Lim Jr.		Tennis player	
Rudy Lingganay		Professional basketball player	
Jimmy Mariano		Philippines men's national basketball team in the 1968 Summer Olympics and 1972 Summer Olympics; college women's basketball coach	
Nelson Mariano		FIDE Grandmaster chess player	
James Martinez		Professional basketball player	
Mean Mendrez		Professional volleyball player	
Riza Nogales		Professional volleyball player	
Alvin Pasaol		Professional basketball player	
Derrick Pumaren		College basketball coach and head coach in the Women's Maharlika Pilipinas Basketball League	
Bong Ravena		Professional basketball player and assistant coach	
Sue Roces		Professional volleyball player	
Marella Salamat		Road cycling racer	
Roi Sumang		Professional basketball player	
Ronald Tubid		Professional basketball player	
Joshua Umandal		Professional basketball player and member of the Philippines men's national volleyball team	
Agatha Wong		Wushu player	
Elmer Yanga		Commissioner of the University Athletic Association of the Philippines Basketball	
James Yap		Professional basketball player	

== Faculty and staff ==
Name	Notability	Ref.
Persida Acosta	Professor of law; Chief Public Attorney of the Philippines	
Bryan Benedict	Tourism and HRM instructor; actor and model	
Antonino Buenaventura	Founding director of the School of Music and the Arts; composer and conductor	
Isagani Cruz	Bar reviewer; Associate Justice of the Supreme Court of the Philippines	
Baby Dalupan	Professional basketball player and coach; coached the UE Red Warriors to seven straight UAAP titles from 1965 to 1971	
Francisco Dalupan Sr.	Founding president and board chairman	
Raul Gonzalez	Vice president of university relations for the University of the East	
Raul Lambino	Professor of political law and constitutional law	
Jimmy Mariano	Head coach of the University of the East	
Koko Pimentel	Professor at the University of the East College of Law from 2007 to 2010; President of the Senate of the Philippines	
Derrick Pumaren	Head basketball coach	
Hermenegildo Reyes	Co-founder and board member of the University of the East	
Juan Salcedo Jr.	Dean of the University of the East Medical College	
Emmanuel T. Santos	Lecturer at the University of the East College of Business Administration and University of the East Graduate School; Governor of Nueva Ecija	
Vic Vargas	Martial arts instructor; film actor and judoka	
Francis Vicente	Volleyball coach; head coach of the Philippines women's national volleyball team	
Jerry Yee	Volleyball coach	
Hsieh Yu-Ming	Professor and chairman of the Department of Physics	
