= University of the East College of Business Administration =

University of the East - College of Business Administration
- Type: Private, Non-Sectarian
- Established: 1947
- Dean: Veronica N. Elizalde
- Undergraduates: Bachelor of Science in Business Administration Major in Financial Management; Bachelor of Science in Business Administration Major in Business Economics; Bachelor of Science in Business Administration Major in Business Management; Bachelor of Science in Business Administration Major in Marketing Management; Bachelor of Science in Business Administration Major in Management Accounting; Bachelor of Science in Accountancy and Computer-Based Accounting Systems (BSA-CAS); Bachelor of Science in Accountancy (BSA); Bachelor of Science in Accounting Technology (BSAct); Bachelor of Science in Business Administration (Management) Special Degree Program
- Postgraduates: Doctor of Business Administration in Financial Management; Doctor of Business Administration in Human Resource Management; Doctor of Business Administration in Marketing Management; Doctor of Business Administration in Production/Operations Management; Master in Business Administration (MBA)
- Location: Sampaloc, Manila, Philippines
- Website: University of the East - College of Business Administration

The University of the East - College of Business Administration was founded as the mother unit of the University of the East, starting from Philippine College of Commerce and Business Administration (PCCBA) in 1946. UE is one of the pioneers of business education in the Philippines and is considered one of the best accounting schools, especially from its founding up to the 1980s, when UE graduates would dominate the topnotchers list of the CPA board exams. The college is both offered in Manila and Caloocan.

== History ==
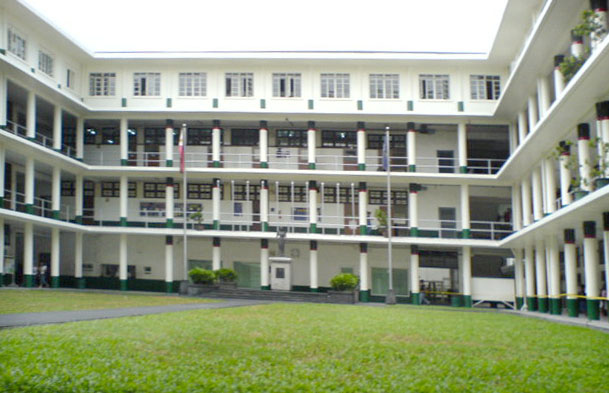
SFC Quadrangle

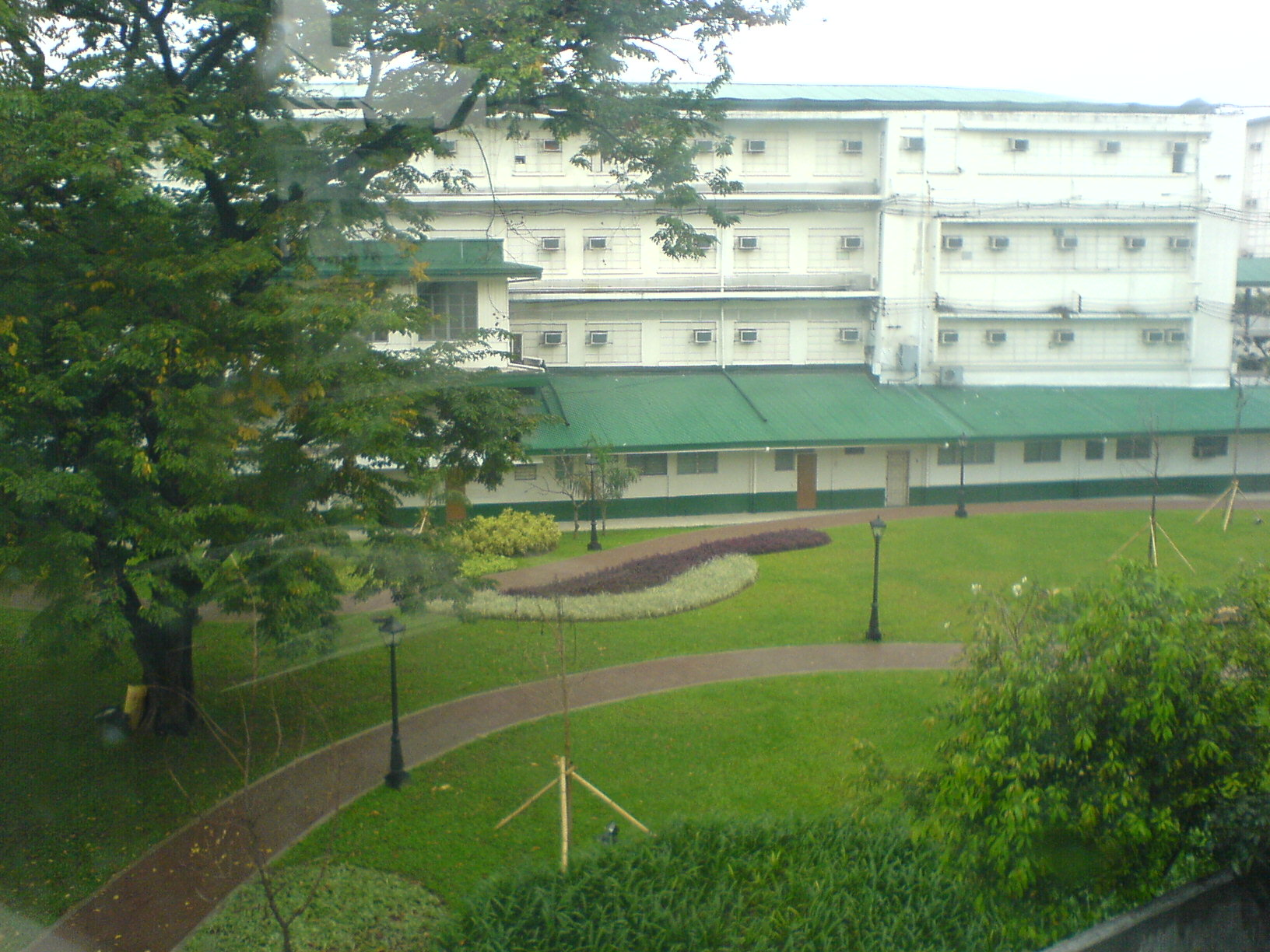
SFC building

The College of Business Administration started as a CPA Review School. On September 11, 1946, five people namely Francisco T. Dalupan, Sr., Herminiglio Reyes, Jose Torres, Jaime Hernandez and Santiago dela Cruz established the Philippine College of Commerce and Business Administration (PCCBA) along R. Papa St. in Sampaloc, Manila. The following year, more students enrolled and more academic units were organized, and the PCCBA moved to what is now UE's main campus on 2219 Claro M. Recto Avenue.

With an enrollment of only 213, the review classes expanded into a college named the College of Commerce. In 1963, it was renamed the College of Business Administration.

In 1963, the university not only got the top ten slots, but seven others as well, two of whom tied at eleventh while three tied at fourteenth and two tied at fifteenth, which added to that unparalleled feat. The university's passing percentage also consistently maintained a grade above the national passing percentage.

The college has a line of distinguished men and women at its helm. Dr. Santiago F. De La Cruz, the first Dean of the College (1947–1971), pushed for excellent performance at the CPA board examinations. As a result, graduates have garnered the 1st to the 20th places in the board examinations over the years.

Dean Sotero Lopez continued the programs of Dr. De La Cruz. When he retired in 1974, Dr. Isidro D. Cariño took over the helm of the college, where he initiated some changes, among which was the upgrading of the criteria for faculty evaluation. In 1976, he introduced the BSBA Special Degree Program (BBM Program for executives without any college degree).

Jesus Casiño succeeded Dr. Cariño in 1977. He revived the honors program designed to upgrade the quality of Accounting majors. When Dean Casiño retired, Jose Papa was appointed Dean. He was succeeded in turn by Carmen Lim, who served as Officer-in-Charge from 1983 to 1984. Dr. Feliciano Roque Jr. took over in 1984, he introduced the “ladder-type curriculum” for all the major fields of specialization. This awards a certificate of Associate in Business Administration at the end of the second curriculum year, and a bachelor's degree at the end of the fourth curriculum year.

UE vice president for finance Erlinda Pefianco became concurrent dean of the college in 1988. To ensure better operation and supervision, the offices of two associate deans were created: Ester F. Ledesma was appointed associate dean for accountancy and Mercedes J. Manaois was associate dean for business.

Dean Pefianco implemented the BS Accountancy Program in 1990. Through her encouragement and wholehearted support, the college was granted Level I accredited status by the Philippine Association of Colleges and Universities Commission on Accreditation (PACUCOA). Upon Dr. Pefianco’s appointment as undersecretary of the department of education, culture and sports (DECS), Dr. Manaois took over as head of the college. Closely working with the faculty, she prepared the college for Level II accreditation, a status that was eventually attained in 1992.

In 1976, extension programs were organized at the Caloocan Campus or UE Caloocan. Among the programs offered were four-year BSBA courses in various areas of specialization. In the 1986 reorganization, the office of the dean of the College of Business Administration-Caloocan (CBA Caloocan) was created, and Teresita Nadurata was appointed its first dean. She implemented the same curricular programs as those offered in the Manila Campus.

October 1991 saw the fusing of the two colleges of business administration under the stewardship of Dean Nadurata. The objective was to achieve uniformity of programs in both Campuses. Meanwhile, Zenaida S. Diola served as associate dean of CBA Caloocan.

Upon the retirement of Dean Nadurata in 1993, Ester F. Ledesma took over the deanship in the Manila Campus while Chancellor Desideria R. Rex served concurrently as dean of CBA Caloocan until the appointment of Dr. Jose P. Nagayo in 1996.

In the Manila Campus, after Associate Dean Ledesma assumed the deanship and taking a cue from then president Rosalina S. Cajucom’s vision of the UE renaissance, she envisioned a two-pronged centerpiece program for the college. The program aimed at the improvement of the quality of instruction through the implementation of a highly selective admission policy in the BSA Program and continuing faculty development. She also adopted a program for Student Care through the Homeroom Year Level Advisory Program. In 1996, Dean Ledesma was able to attain the PACUCOA’s Level II re-accredited status for CBA Manila. To further improve the quality of the BS Accountancy program, she crafted and implemented the five-year BS Accountancy program. In 1998, CBA Manila under her leadership was listed by the Professional Regulation Commission (PRC) as the number 3 top performing school with over 100 examinees.

CBA Caloocan Dean Nagayo was succeeded shortly after by Dr. Francisco L. Lontoc, who served up to April 30, 1997. Associate Dean Asuncion B. Howe was designated officer-in-charge until the appointment of a new dean, Dr. Felino L. Ampil Jr., in January 1998.

Dr. Jose C. Benedicto became dean of CBA Caloocan in 1999. He served on a concurrent capacity when he was appointed chancellor of UE Caloocan shortly after. Baltazar N. Endriga became the next dean of the college. Formerly president and chairman of the board of trustees of the Cultural Center of the Philippines, he was eventually appointed vice president for academic affairs and is now the president and chief academic officer of the university. Eduardo M. Trinidad is the current dean of CBA Caloocan. Dean Trinidad is one of the elected directors in the education sector of the Philippine Institute of Certified Public Accountants (PICPA). A banker for 20 years and a guest faculty member at the Asian Institute of Management before becoming CBA Caloocan dean in May 2002, Dean Trinidad has worked closely with the Accountancy faculty to strictly implement the retention policy for Accountancy students, to improve the quality of teaching and to push for the teachers’ continuing professional development. He has also encouraged the accountancy teachers to voluntarily mentor students who are weak in certain subjects as a form of review and as a service to others.

In 1999, the vice president for information technology and systems of the university, Numeriano M. de la Cruz, succeeded Dean Ledesma. VP De la Cruz became the concurrent dean of the college. He strictly implemented the retention policy for the Accountancy majors as well as the Total Student Care and Total Faculty Care programs with the mission to “bring back the glory that was UE.” In 2000, Dr. Rellita D. Paez took over the helm of the college. It was during her term that the college was granted a second Level II re-accreditation by PACUCOA.

Dean Geronimo C. Estacio succeeded Dr. Paez in August 2002. Bringing with him his vast experience as chief financial officer of Procter & Gamble, he launched the “Turn-Around Plan” envisioned to produce future CPA topnotch board placers through the revival of the Accounting Honors Program. Following Dean Estacio’s resignation shortly after, Macario G. Sevilla assumed the headship of the college. Dean Sevilla launched other programs aside from the Accounting Honors Program, such as the Accounting Lecture Series and the establishment of professorial chairs. He spearheaded the organization of the UE College of Business Administration Accounting Alumni Foundation, which aims to provide coordinated and united financial and professional support to the academic programs of the college.

Within the past 60 years, the College of Business Administration produced more than 350 top placers in the CPA Board Examinations. Twenty-nine of these were first placers, while 50 were 2nd and 3rd placers. The rest dominated the 4th to the 20th slots.

The College of Business Administration in Manila as well as in Caloocan register the highest enrollment among the UE Colleges annually. It continues to produce graduates who are highly placed in private and in government institutions.

== Graduate programs ==
For more information: University of the East Graduate School

- Doctor of Business Administration in Financial Management
- Doctor of Business Administration in Human Resource Management
- Doctor of Business Administration in Marketing Management
- Doctor of Business Administration in Production/Operations Management
- Master in Business Administration (MBA)

== Undergraduate Offerings ==
- Bachelor of Science in Business Administration Major in Financial Management
- Bachelor of Science in Business Administration Major in Business Economics
- Bachelor of Science in Business Administration Major in Business Management
- Bachelor of Science in Business Administration Major in Marketing Management
- Bachelor of Science in Business Administration Major in Management Accounting
- Bachelor of Science in Accountancy and Computer-Based Accounting Systems (BSA-CAS)
- Bachelor of Science in Accountancy (BSA)
- Bachelor of Science in Accounting Technology (BSAct)
- Bachelor of Science in Business Administration (Management) Special Degree Program

== See also ==
- University of the East
