= Maratabat: Pride and Honor =

2014 Filipino crime drama film

- Directed by: Arlyn dela Cruz
- Written by: Arlyn dela Cruz
- Produced by: Arlan Bernal; Sylvia Calderon; Crystalyn Lagman
- Starring: Ping Medina; Julio Diaz; Kristoffer King; Richard Quan; Chanel La Torre; Shyr Valdez; Alvin Fortuna; Carlo Cruz; Elizabeth Oropesa
- Cinematography: Rommel Sales
- Edited by: Carlo Manatad
- Music by: Teresa Barrozo
- Production company: Blank Pages Production
- Distributed by: Blank Pages Production
- Release date: December 17, 2014
- Running time: 98 minutes
- Country: Philippines
- Language: Filipino

Maratabat: Pride and Honor is a 2014 Filipino crime drama film written and directed by Arlyn dela Cruz in her feature directorial debut. About a feud between two Muslim clans in Mindanao and the aftermath of the massacre of journalists, the film stars Ping Medina and Julio Diaz as the two leaders of the clans, alongside Elizabeth Oropesa, Kristoffer King, Richard Quan and Chanel La Torre.

== Cast ==
- Ping Medina as Ronwaldo Mahardika
- Julio Diaz as Governor Salvador Abubakar
- Elizabeth Oropesa as Bai Esperanza
- Kristoffer King
- Richard Quan
- Chanel La Torre as Stella
- Shyr Valdez
- Alvin Fortuna
- Carlo Cruz
- Leon Miguel as Fredo
- Joel Saracho
- Amante Pulido
- Bobby Tamayo
- Zyrus Imperial
- Alexander Josello Ascano V
- Aileen Intia
- Janzhed Lerr Negrite
- Marco Salvador
- Ace Vidal
- Persida V. Rueda-Acosta

== Production ==
Arlyn dela Cruz, a journalist by profession, marked her feature directorial debut with Maratabat, which she partially based on the Maguindanao massacre in 2009.

Though actor Ping Medina was initially offered the role of the antagonist (later given to Kristoffer King), dela Cruz instead offered him the lead role of Ronwaldo Mahardika upon speaking to him, with the actor stating that "[t]his was the first time I've been scared shitless to play a role." The role of Ronwaldo was previously offered to Derek Ramsay, who had to decline early on due to scheduling conflicts. The role of Stella was also previously offered to Kris Aquino, who expressed support for the film but had to also decline due to her busy schedule.

Lawyer Persida Acosta, chief of the Public Attorney's Office, appears in a cameo role in the film for free, stating that she did it as "part of my public service and advocacy".

== Release ==
The film was first released in a few local theaters on December 17, 2014, as a "New Wave" entry to the 40th Metro Manila Film Festival.

== Accolades ==
Group	Category	Name	Result
Metro Manila Film Festival	New Wave Best Supporting Actor	Kristoffer King	Won
PMPC Star Awards for Movies	Indie Movie of the Year	Maratabat: Pride and Honor	Nominated
PMPC Star Awards for Movies	Indie Movie Director of the Year	Arlyn dela Cruz	Nominated
PMPC Star Awards for Movies	Indie Movie Screenwriter of the Year	Arlyn dela Cruz	Won
PMPC Star Awards for Movies	Indie Movie Cinematographer of the Year	Rommel Sales	Nominated
PMPC Star Awards for Movies	Indie Movie Editor of the Year	Carlo Francisco Manatad	Nominated
PMPC Star Awards for Movies	Indie Movie Production Designer of the Year	Gerardo Calagui	Nominated
PMPC Star Awards for Movies	Indie Movie Musical Scorer of the Year	Teresa Barrozo	Nominated
PMPC Star Awards for Movies	Indie Movie Sound Engineer of the Year	Wildsound	Nominated
The People's Film Festival	Best International Film	Maratabat: Pride and Honor	Won
IndieFEST Film Awards	Award of Merit	Maratabat: Pride and Honor	Won
