= Public Attorney's Office =

Public Attorney's Office could refer to:

- Public Prosecutor's Office (Brazil)
- Public Attorney's Office (Philippines)
