= University of the East College of Dentistry =

Dental school in the Philippines

College of Dentistry
- Type: Private
- Established: 1948
- Affiliations: Aichi-Gakuin University School of Dentistry, Japan; Nagasaki University School of Dentistry, Japan; Niigata University Faculty of Dentistry, Japan; University de Rennes I School of Dentistry, France; New York University College of Dentistry, USA
- Dean: Iluminada L Viloria DMD
- Associate Dean: Phides Pangilinan-Alcorta DMD
- Location: Sampaloc, Manila, Philippines
- Campus: Urban
- Website: University of the East College of Dentistry

The University of the East College of Dentistry was first established as a unit of the Philippine College of Commerce and Business Administration in 1948. The college is one of the pioneers of dental education and labeled as the sole top-performing dental school in the Philippines.

== Rankings ==
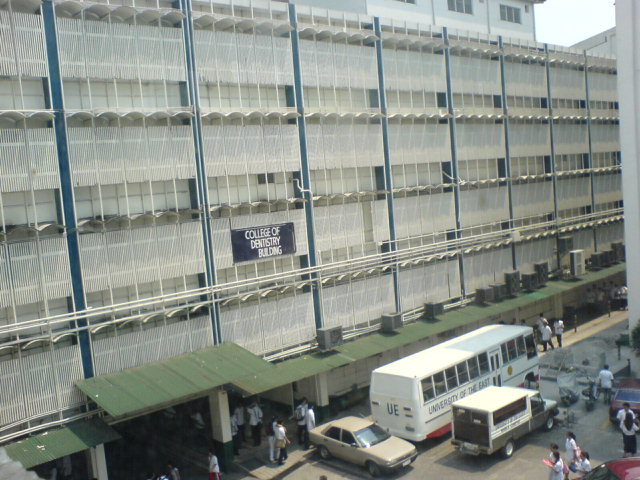
College of Dentistry

The University of the East College of Dentistry ranked No. 1 in among dental schools based on the results of the December 2007, 2026 Dentist Licensure Examination released recently by the Professional Regulation Commission’s (PRC) Board of Dentistry. Achieving a passing percentage of 86%.

Four UE College of Dentistry (UECD) fresh graduates clinched 2nd, 5th, 6th and 10th places in the June 2009 Dentist Licensure Examination. UECD achieved a 98% passing percentage with 57 successful examinees out of 58, garnering No. 1 status at the 29-99 examinees category, maintaining its rank as the No. 1 performing school in Dentistry. This 98% passing percentage, higher by more than 100% than the 45.38% national overall passing percentage, is UECD’s highest passing percentage in ten (10) years, resulting to 3 consecutive years of UECD posting more than 90% passing rate.

UE College of Dentistry was named the sole top-performing school for licensure examination conducted by the Philippine Regulatory Commission for the recent years to present. Recent achievements include:

•January 2018: The college's graduates led the licensure exams, with one securing the top spot.

•November 2023: UE-Manila was named the sole top-performing school, with a graduate topping the examination.

•November-December 2024: UE College of Dentistry was recognized by the Professional Regulation Commission as the top-performing school, achieving a 93.10% passing rate

== Curricular Offerings ==
- Doctor of Dental Medicine, DMD (6 years)

the University also offers four master of Science in Dentistry courses to qualified local and foreign students.

The Masters program is available as one of the following:

- Periodontics
- Orthodontics
- Prosthodontics
- Endodontics

== Student Organizations ==
Dental students' governance:

- UECD Student Council
- UECD Clinician's Club

Recognized SOs

- Achievers’ Council for Excellence (ACE) – A long-standing dental org focused on academic excellence and leadership development.
- Dental Health Team (UE-DHT) – A community-oriented dental student organization founded in 1975 with a focus on service, skills, and camaraderie.
- UE Filipino-Chinese Dental Students Association (UE FCDSA) – A group celebrating Filipino-Chinese heritage and unity among dental students.
- Philippine Dental Students’ Association (PDSA) – A local chapter for dental students that also connects to the national organization.
- Rotaract Club (RAC) – A service and leadership club with global ties, active among dental students.

== See also ==
- University of the East
