= Nelson Mariano =

Filipino chess grandmaster (born 1974)

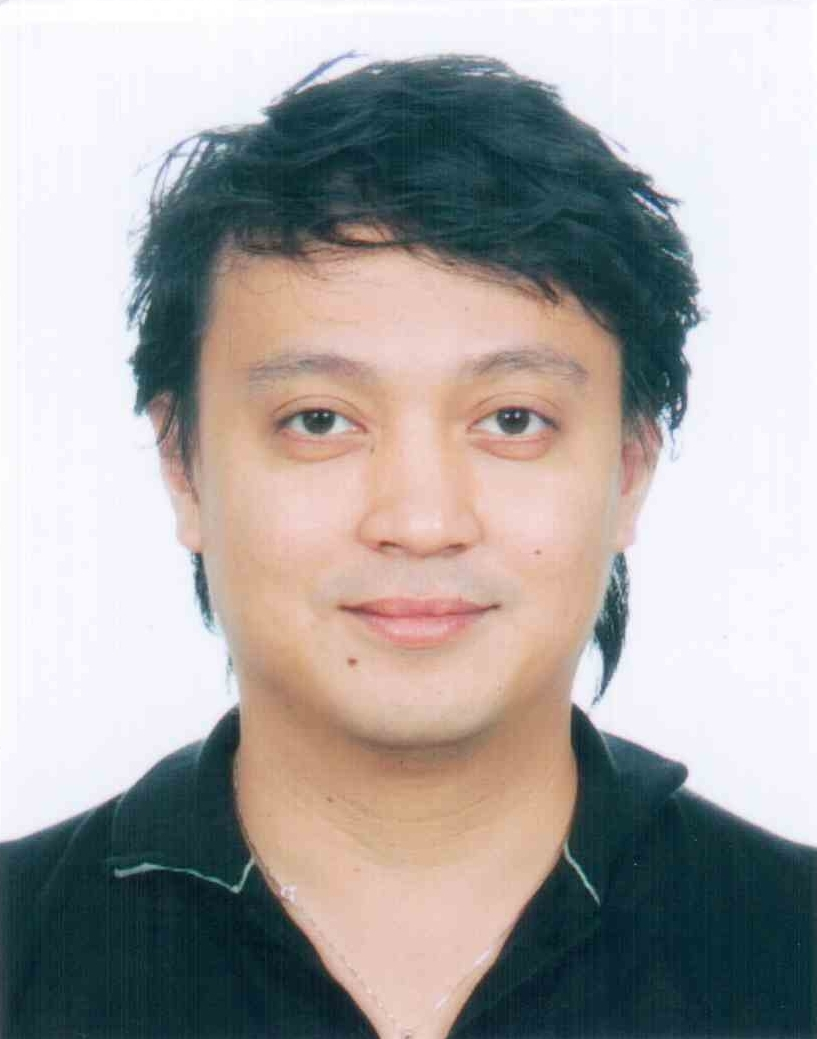
- Mariano in 2010

Personal information
- Born: Nelson Isurina Mariano II; June 28, 1974 (age 52) Manila, Philippines

Chess career
- Country: Philippines
- Title: Grandmaster (2004)
- FIDE rating: 2447 (October 2026)
- Peak rating: 2510 (January 1995)

Nelson Isurina Mariano II (born June 28, 1974) is a Filipino chess player. He was awarded the title of Grandmaster by FIDE in 2004, the fifth from the Philippines. Mariano won the Asian Junior Chess Championship in 1994.

== Life and career ==
Nelson grew up in the Philippines, where he began to learn chess at the age of 3 under the tutelage of his father, Nelson I, his first chess coach. He was educated at the University of the East.

The prodigy was soon defeating opponents older and more experienced than himself. Nelson, his sister Cristine Rose Mariano, a Woman International Master and FIDE-Instructor, Carmina Joy Mariano and his brother Nelson Mariano III FIDE Master are all Filipino chess players. At the age of 7, he played his first serious game against a carpenter beside their house in Cebu City.

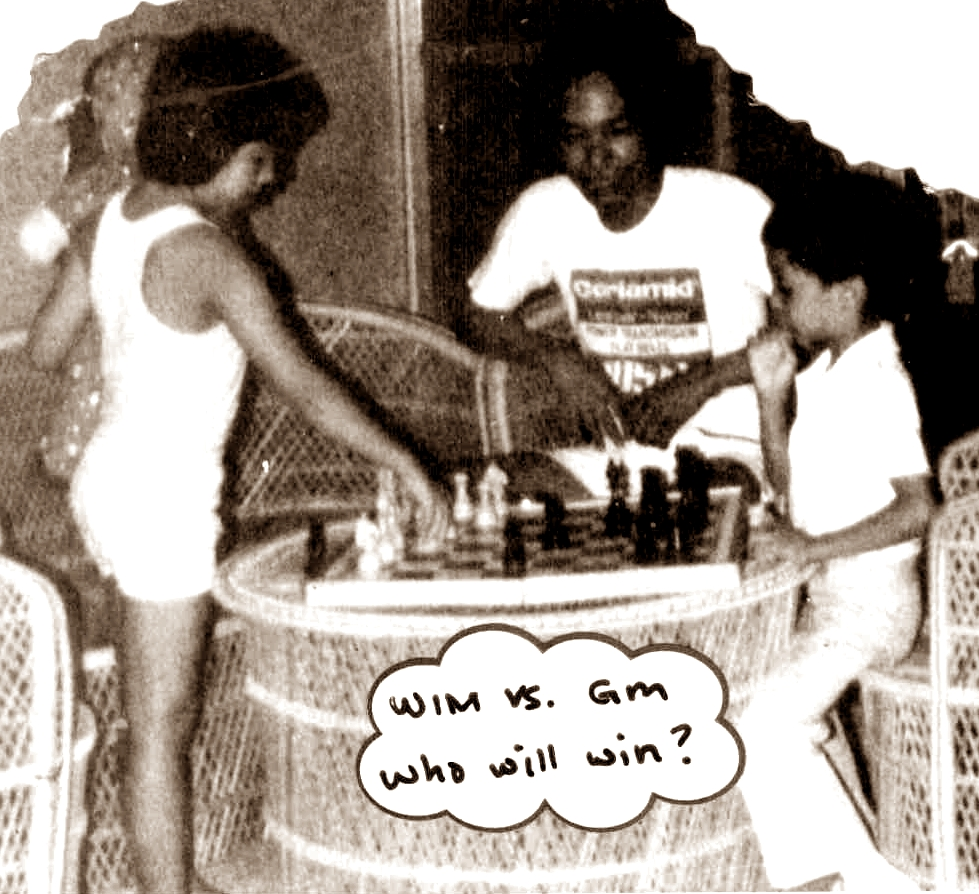
WIM Cristine Rose Mariano playing with her younger brother GM Nelson Mariano II while their father is watching

When the Mariano family moved to Manila from Cebu, Jet started playing in serious competitions, mostly in men's division and under-20 category. He achieved the International Master (IM) title when he became the 1994 Champion at the Asian Junior Chess Championship held in Shah Alam, Malaysia at the age of 19.

The President of the Philippines, Honorable Fidel V. Ramos honored Nelson for his outstanding performances in the Asian Junior and World Juniors Chess Championship in August 1994 placing equal 3rd, held in Matinhos, Brazil, the highest place attained ever by a Filipino chess players until today.

In April 2004, "GM Jet" earned his second GM norm at the 6th Dubai Open Championships and went on to earn his final GM norm at the Bangkok GM Circuit event in Thailand. In 2007, International Grandmaster Nelson "Jet" Mariano II decided to retire and teach chess in Singapore.

In 2006, Mariano was given the Distinguished Achievement Award by the University of the East for his achievements in the field of chess. This award has been given to nine outstanding sportspersons in the 60 years of the University's history. That includes James Yap, Robert Jaworski, The Vice President of the Philippines Honorable Noli de Castro, and five others. GM Jet as his students call him was also the coach/trainer/and sparring partner of GM Rogelio Antonio Jr. in his match against GM Eugenio Torre, Manila 1998.

In 2008, he started his own chess school, Chesskidz LLP and has since been imparting his knowledge in chess to children, youth and adults around the region.

Mariano is currently the chief coach of ASEAN Chess Academy, a grandmaster school based in Singapore.

== Retirement from chess ==
After a strong runner-up finish in the prestigious Asian Zonal 3.3 World Cup qualifier held in Phu Quoc, Vietnam in 2007. Nelson announced his retirement in February 2007 from competitive chess. He cited the reason to pursue his dream of imparting his knowledge to the younger generation of chess players.

(He conveyed it to National Chess Federation of the Philippines President Prospero Pichay Jr. and the late Executive Director Wilfredo Abalos ) and expressed fulfillment of what he had achieved throughout his chess career.

Being a good standing member of the National Chess Federation of the Philippines, Nelson was offered to lead the Philippine Team to the 2007 Asian Cities Chess Championship because of his good performance at the Asian Zonal 3.3 Championship. Nelson respectfully declined and gave up his slot to the younger Filipino chess players to play in Asian Cities Chess Championship in Iran that was held March 1–9, 2007 in Tehran.

=== Post-retirement chess ===
On 29 August 2010 in his first public chess event since his retirement, Nelson played in the 2010 Merdeka Chess Team Championships held in Kuala Lumpur, Malaysia. An event played with the time control of 25 minutes per player, Nelson scored 6.5/9 on Board 1 (4 wins and 5 draws) leading his team Chesskidz LLP-Men's Team to its first ever Merdeka Championship Crown.

Nelson has been coaching Chesskidz LLP students - a grandmaster chess school in Singapore since July 2008. The 2010 Merdeka Chess Team Championship in Malaysia was one of the chess programs of Chesskidz LLP organized as the first field trip exposure for its students.

Prior to his transfer to Chesskidz LLP, he resigned from Power Chess Asia, where he was asked to sign an addendum, stating that if he quits from the company, he cannot work in Singapore in anything related to chess for 36 months, failure of which will have him pay PCA S$50,000 (roughly P1.5 million). He won a defamation case against this said former employer.

== Notable games ==
GM Mariano, Nelson II – GM Anton Korobov
2004.07.27 UAE Event: Dubai op 6th
1.e4 c5 2.Ne2 (Sicilian Defense, Chameleon Variation) Nc6 3.Nbc3 e6 4.g3 d5 5.exd5 exd5 6.Bg2 d4 7.Nd5 Nf6 8.Nef4 Nxd5 9.Nxd5 Bd6 10.0-0 d3 11.b4 0-0 12.bxc5 Bxc5 13.Bb2 Qg5 14.cxd3 Bd7 15.h4 Qh6 16.Rc1 b6 17.d4 Bd6 18.Nxb6 axb6 19.Bxc6 Rxa2 20.Qb3 Ra7 21.Qxb6 Bb8 22.d5 Bg4 23.Rfe1 Ra2 24.Bc3 Ba7 25.Qb4 1–0

Adianto vs. Mariano, 2005

Position: h1 white rook, f1 white bishop, c1 white king, h2 white pawn, g2 white pawn, e2 white queen, b2 white pawn, a2 white pawn, f3 white pawn, c3 black queen, f4 white knight, c4 black pawn, e5 white pawn, d5 white rook, b5 black pawn, b6 white bishop, a6 black knight, h7 black pawn, g7 black pawn, f7 black pawn, e7 black knight, d7 black pawn, b7 black bishop, h8 black rook, f8 black bishop, e8 black king, a8 black rook

Position after 15...Qxc3+!

This game was awarded as the "Full Nelson" (game of the day Aug-18-06).
GM Mariano, Nelson II – GM Utut Adianto
Kuala Lumpur op 2nd Kuala Lumpur (5), 22.08.2005
1.d4 Nf6 2.c4 c5 3.d5 b5 4.cxb5 a6 5.f3 e6 6.e4 exd5 7.e5 Qe7 8.Qe2 Ng8 9.Nc3 Bb7 10.Nh3 c4 11.Be3 axb5 12.0–0–0 Qb4 13.Nf4 Ne7 14.Bb6 Na6N [RR 14...h5 15.Rxd5 Qxc3+! 16.bxc3 Nxd5 17.Nxd5 Bxd5 18.Qd2 Be6 19.Be2 Nc6 20.f4?! b4 21.f5 bxc3 22.Qxc3 Ra3 23.Qb2 c3 24.Qb5 Bxf5 25.Rf1 Rxa2 26.Rxf5 Nb4 27.Qa5 g6 0–1 Lalic, B (2585)-Khalifman, A (2650)/Linares 1997/CBM 058; RR 14...g6 15.Rxd5 Qxc3+ (RR 15...Nxd5 16.Nfxd5 Bh6+ 17.Kb1 Bxd5 18.Nxd5 Qa4 19.Nc7+ Ke7 20.Bc5+ Kd8 21.Nxa8 Qxa8 22.g3 Qd5 23.Bb6+ Kc8 24.Bg2 Re8 25.f4 Qe6 26.Qf2 Bf8 27.Rc1 Nc6 28.a4 Qf5+ 29.Qc2 Qxc2+ 30.Rxc2 Mincsovics, M (2255)-Masat, A/Hungary 1993/TD/½–½ (77)) 16.bxc3 Nxd5 17.Nxd5 Bxd5 18.Kb1 Nc6 19.Qe3 Be7 20.Bc5 0–0 21.Bxe7 Nxe7 22.Qc5 Rfe8 23.a3 Bc6 24.Kb2 Nd5 25.Qd4 Re6 26.h4 h5 27.f4 d6 28.Rg1 dxe5 29.fxe5 Miniboeck, G (2355)-Danailovs (2455)/Vienna 1996/CBM 053 ext/1–0 (58)] 15.Rxd5 Qxc3+ 16.bxc3 Nxd5 17.Qe4 Ba3+ 18.Kd2 Nc5 19.Bxc5 Bxc5 20.Nxd5 Rxa2+ 21.Kc1 [21.Kd1 Ra1+ 22.Ke2 Ra2+ 23.Ke1 Ra1+ 24.Kd2 Ra2+=] 21...0–0 22.Ne7+ Bxe7 23.Qxb7 Bg5+ 24.f4 Bxf4+ 25.Kd1 Rfa8 26.Ke1?? [26.Qd5 Be3 27.h4 R8a7! 28.Rh3 Rb2!!–+] 26...Bxe5 27.Qf3 [27.Be2 Bxc3+ 28.Kf2 (28.Kf1 Re8 29.Qf3 Ra1+ 30.Kf2 Bd4+ 31.Kg3 Rxh1–+) 28...Re8 29.Kg3 Raxe2 30.Qxb5 R2e3+ 31.Kf2 Bd4 32.Qxc4 Re2+ 33.Kf3 R8e3+ 34.Kf4 Re4+ 35.Kf3 R2e3+ 36.Kf2 Rf4+ 37.Kg1 Re1#; 27.Qxb5 Bxc3+ 28.Kd1 Rd2+ 29.Kc1 Ra1+ 30.Qb1 Rxb1+ 31.Kxb1 d5–+; 27.Qxd7 Bxc3+ 28.Kd1 Rb2–+] 27...Re8 28.Kd1 Ra1+ [28...Bf6!–+] 29.Kc2 Ra2+ 30.Kd1 Bf6 31.g3 Ra1+ 32.Kd2 Bg5+ 33.Kc2 Ra2+ 34.Kb1 Rea8 0–1

Mariano vs. So, 2007

Position: f8 black rook, g8 black king, b7 white rook, f7 black pawn, g7 black pawn, d6 black pawn, f6 black queen, h6 black pawn, c5 black bishop, d5 white bishop, e5 black pawn, h5 white pawn, e4 white pawn, a3 black pawn, c3 white pawn, f3 white queen, g3 white pawn, a2 white pawn, f2 white pawn, g2 white king

Position after 34.h5! zugzwang

GM Mariano, Nelson II – GM Wesley So
Phu Quoc zt 3.3 Phu Quoc, Vietnam (7), 11.01.2007
1.e4 c5 2.Nf3 Nc6 3.d4 cxd4 4.Nxd4 Nf6 5.Nc3 e5 6.Ndb5 d6 7.Bg5 a6 8.Na3 b5 9.Nd5 Be7 10.Bxf6 Bxf6 11.c3 0–0 12.Nc2 Rb8 13.Be2 Bg5 14.0–0 Be6 15.Qd3 a5 16.Rfd1 Qd7 17.Qg3 h6 18.h3N [RR 18.h4 Bd8 19.Nce3 (RR 19.Rd2 ) 19...Kh8 20.Rd2 (RR 20.a4 bxa4 21.Nc4 Bc7 22.Rd2 Bxd5 23.Rxd5 Ne7 24.Rd2 Qc6 25.Qd3 Rfd8 26.Bf3 Qb5 27.Qe2 Rb7 28.g3 Kg8 29.Bg2 Rdb8 30.Bf1 Qc6 31.Rad1 Qc5 32.Ra1 Rb3 33.Rxa4 d5 34.exd5 Nxd5 Lau, R (2540)-Jussupow, A (2620)/Munich 1988/CBM 007/½–½ (53)) 20...Bb6 21.Nf5 Bxf5 22.exf5 f6 23.Bxb5 Bxf2+ 24.Qxf2 Rxb5 25.Rad1 Rd8 26.a4 Rbb8 27.Nb6 Qc7 28.Nc4 d5 29.Rxd5 Rxd5 30.Rxd5 Ne7 31.Rc5 Qd7 32.Ne3 Qxa4 Balashov, Y (2540)-Dvoretzky, M (2495)/Yerevan 1975/URS-ch/½–½ (42); RR 18.a3 Kh8 19.h4 Bd8 20.Nce3 b4 21.a4 bxc3 22.bxc3 f5 23.exf5 Bxf5 24.Bb5 Be6 25.Rd2 Qb7 26.Qg6 Bxd5 27.Nxd5 Bxh4 28.Bd3 Kg8 29.Qh7+ Kf7 30.Qg6+ Kg8 31.Qh7+ Kf7 32.Bg6+ Ke6 Roiz Baztan, D-Menendez Rey, F/Spain 1990/EXT 1998/1–0 (42)] 18...b4 19.Nce3 bxc3 20.bxc3 Bxd5 21.Nxd5 Rb2 22.Bc4 a4?! 23.h4 Bd8 24.Rab1 Qb7 25.Nb4² Rxb1 26.Rxb1 Ne7 27.Qd3 Qd7 28.g3 Bb6 29.Nd5 Bc5 30.Kg2 a3? [30...Kh8!? 31.Nxe7 Qxe7 32.Bd5 Qf6²] 31.Qf3± Nxd5 32.Bxd5 Qe7 33.Rb7 Qf6 34.h5‡ Qd8 35.Rxf7 Rxf7 36.Qxf7+ Kh8 37.Be6 Bb6 38.Bf5 Bc7 39.g4 Bb6 40.Kf3 Bc5 41.g5 hxg5 42.Kg4 Qg8 43.Qg6 Bxf2 44.h6!+- (If 44...Bc5 45.Be6!! Qf8 46.hg7+ Qg7 47.Qe8+ Kh7 48.Bf5+! Kh6 49.Qh5#) 1–0

== Achievements (1987–2010) ==
| YEAR | AWARDS |
|---|---|
| 1987 | Asian Under-16 Chess Championship "3rd place" Youngest Participant-age 12 (Manila Philippines) |
| 1990 | Awarded National Master title at Age 15 (Manila, Philippines) |
| 1991 | First National Rapid Chess Tournament Knockout tournament System 2nd Place (Manila, Philippines), GM Buenaventura Villamayor is the "Champion" |
| 1992 | International Chess Open Championship Champion(PICC Manila, Philippines) |
| 1993 | Asian Junior Chess Championship 3rd Place (Qatar)First International Exposure |
| 1993 | Philippine Junior Chess Championship Champion (Manila, Philippines) |
| 1993 | Phil. Junior Shell Rapid Chess Championship Champion (Makati, Philippines) Shell Oil Company |
| 1994 | Philippine Junior Chess Championship Champion (Manila, Philippines) |
| 1994 | Philippines Open Championship Champion (Cebu City, Philippines) |
| 1994 | Asian Junior Chess Championship Champion Earned International Master (IM) Title (Malaysia) |
| 1994 | Honored by President of the Republic of the Philippines Fidel V. Ramos at (Malacanang palace) |
| 1994 | World Junior Chess Championship, Tied for 3rd place (Brazil) |
| 1995 | Asian Team Chess Championship, Member Philippine Team Champion (Singapore) |
| 1995 | Las Vegas Chess Open (Standard) 2nd place (Las Vegas, USA) |
| 1995 | Las Vegas Chess Blitz Open 2nd place (Las Vegas, USA) |
| 1995 | New York Chess Open Blitz Championship 3rd Place (New York, USA) |
| 1995 | GM Circuit Singapore Pool, Champion earned 1st GM Norm, (Singapore) |
| 1996 | Under 25 World Chess championship 2nd place (Brazil) |
| 1997 | Under 25 World Chess championshipTeam, 5th place (Argentina) |
| 2000 | Malaysia Merdeka Open Championship (Standard)3rd Place (Kuala Lumpur, Malaysia) |
| 2000 | Philippine Society Open Championship Quezon City Champion, (Philippines) |
| 2001 | Malaysia Merdeka Open Blitz Championship, Champion (Kuala Lumpur, Malaysia) |
| 2002 | Philippines Open Championship 2nd Place (Makati City, Philippines) |
| 2002 | Member of Philippine Chess Olympiad Team (Slovenia) |
| 2003 | Asian Cities Team Championship, 3rd Place (Tagaytay, Philippines) |
| 2003 | Bangkok Open Blitz Championship Champion (Bangkok, Thailand) |
| 2003-05 | 3X Merdeka Team Rapid Champion KL, Malaysia |
| 2004 | Earned 2nd GM Norm, Dubai Open (Playing with 8 GM's and 1 IM in 9 rounds) |
| 2004 | Bangkok GM Circuit Earned 3rd GM Norm Champion, Awarded the Grandmaster Title |
| 2004 | Voted Chess Player of the Year by Philippines Sportswriters Association (PSA) |
| 2005 | South East Asian Games Silver Medallist (Rapid Division) (Tagaytay, Philippines) |
| 2006 | Distinguished Achievement Award by the University of the East for his achievements in the area of chess |
| 2007 | Asian Zonal Championship Zone 3.3 (Qualifying for World Championship) 2nd place (Vietnam) Inaugural Journalist Voting, Chess Journalists Association of the Philippines (CJAP) |
| 2007 | Voted Chess Player of the month, January 2007, |
| 2010 | Merdeka Team Championship (CHAMPION)Brd.1 |
