= Reynold Fajardo =

Chief Public Attorney of the Philippines
- In office 1975 – October 1997
- President: Ferdinand Marcos; Corazon Aquino; Fidel V. Ramos

Personal details
- Born: Reynold Smith Fajardo; August 31, 1932 Masantol, Pampanga, Philippine Commonwealth
- Died: January 27, 2006 (aged 73)
- Education: University of the Philippines
- Profession: Lawyer

Reynold Smith Fajardo was a Filipino lawyer and Masonic historian who was chief of the Public Attorney's Office from 1975 to 1997.

== Early life and education ==
Reynold Smith Fajardo was born on August 31, 1932 in Masantol, Pampanga on August 31, 1932. He graduated from the University of the Philippines in 1955.

== Career ==
=== Public Attorney's Office ===
Fajardo was appointed as the head of the then-newly created Citizens Legal Assistance Office (CLAO) in 1975 by President Ferdinand Marcos. The CLAO is a government agency that provides legal assistance to indigents. In 1987, the CLAO was renamed as the Public Attorney's Office (PAO).

He retired from the PAO in October 1997.

=== Freemasonry ===
Fajardo was a freemason. He was the Grand Master of the Grand Lodge of Free and Accepted Masons of the Philippines from 1986 to 1987.

As a historian, Fajardo has written the role of Freemasonry in the Philippine Revolution. He has hailed Jose Rizal as the "international mason" noting the writer's membership in multiple lodges in Europe.

== Death ==
Fajardo died on January 27, 2006.
