= University of the East Caloocan =

Private university in Caloocan, Philippines

University of the East - Caloocan Campus
- Pamantasan ng Silangan, Lungsod ng Caloocan (Filipino)
- Motto: In the Service of the Youth, Country and God
- Type: Private, non-sectarian
- Established: June 1954 (Caloocan Campus)
- Academic affiliations: ASAIHL, IAU, PACUOCA, PAASCU, FAAP, PACU
- Chairman: Lucio Tan
- Chancellor: Victor R. Macam, Jr.
- President: Zosimo Battad
- Undergraduates: over 19,000
- Location: 105 Samson Road, Sangandaan, Caloocan, Philippines; 14°39′32″N 120°58′35″E
- Campus: Urban, 48,600 m^{2} (523,000 sq ft)
- Hymn: Pamantasan Ka Naming Mahal (The UE Hymn)
- Colors: Red and white
- Nickname: UE Red Warriors
- Sporting affiliations: UAAP
- Mascot: Red Warrior
- Website: www.ue.edu.ph/cal/
- Location in Metro Manila Location in Luzon Location in the Philippines

The University of the East, Caloocan Extension Campus (Pamantasan ng Silangan and commonly abbreviated as UE Caloocan or UE Cal) is a private higher education institution in Caloocan, Philippines. It is one of the three campuses of the University of the East system. It is an autonomous unit headed by a chancellor, with the College of Business Administration, Arts and Sciences, Engineering, and Fine Arts. UE Caloocan is called Caloocan Campus to distinguish it from the Manila Campus on C.M. Recto Avenue.

== History ==
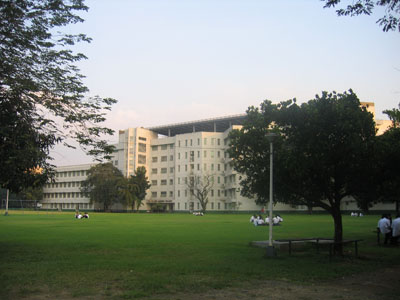
UE Caloocan Campus

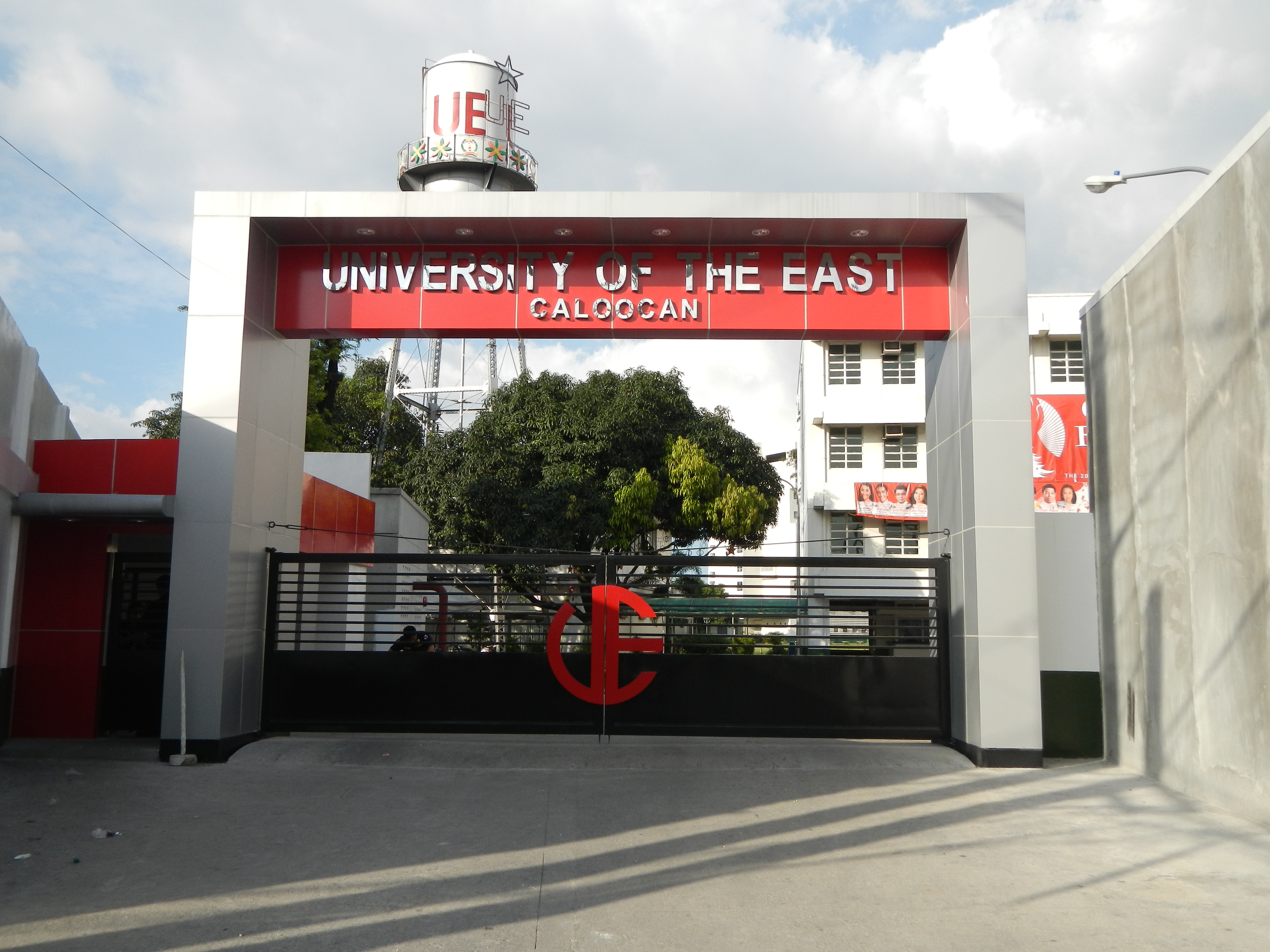
UE Caloocan Main Gate

In June 1954, a new campus was opened on a 4.86-hectare (12.0-acre) lot along Samson Road, Caloocan, then it was known as UE Tech. With the Technical School as a junior college offering liberal arts courses and training technical subjects, and a complete secondary course with both academic and vocational curricula, this brought the university into compliance with the 2-2 Plan of the Department of Education.

School year 1957–1958 marked the offering of general courses leading to the Associate of Arts, Bachelor of Arts and Bachelor of Business Administration degrees and a one-year course leading to a Certificate in Secretarial Science. The next six years saw the construction of the High School Building, the Gymnasium, the Applied Industrial Training Building, the Home Economics Building, the block-long Shop Buildings, the Cement Products Shop and the Woodworking and Construction Building.

By school year 1960–1961, first and second year Liberal Arts, first and second year Commerce and pre-Law courses were offered. By August 1964, the UETS started phasing out its technical offerings. The elementary and the high schools as well as Secretarial courses were also phased out but, in their place, Engineering courses and a complete Business Administration program were offered starting in 1977. Thus, began the campus shift from being a vocational-technical school to becoming an academic extension of UE Manila.

In 1976, when extension programs began to be offered, the Caloocan Campus adopted the name University of the East Caloocan.

The School of Fine Arts was relocated to the Caloocan Campus before the opening of the 1981–1982 school year. The SFA, established on July 15, 1964, and incorporated in October of that year, started as a unit of the UE Manila School of Music and Arts under the UE Research Center for Sciences, Humanities and Culture. The other units were the School of Music and the Ballet School. The school used to be in what was then the College of Dentistry building on Aurora Boulevard across from the UE Ramon Magsaysay Memorial Medical Center.

In 1977, Dean Oscar Limlingan of the College of Engineering was appointed officer-in-charge of UE Caloocan. Later, he became assistant vice president, then vice president and the first chancellor of UE Caloocan.

The UE Caloocan grounds have been used for ROTC and CAT instruction since 1986.

UE Caloocan enhanced its own infrastructure and that of Caloocan with the Tan Yan Kee Academic Building, which was opened in the second semester of the 2003–2004 school year and was inaugurated in December 2003.

At present, UE Caloocan houses the Colleges of Arts and Sciences (CAS), Business Administration (CBA), Fine Arts (CFA) and Engineering (CoE). They have counterpart colleges at UE's Manila campus, except for the college of Fine Arts.

More than 15 programs of UE Caloocan in the colleges of Engineering, Arts and Sciences, and Business Administration were given Level I, II and III accredited status under the Philippine Association of Accredited Schools, Colleges and Universities (PAASCU).

== Campus ==
The campus is a 4.86-hectare (12.0-acre) lot along Samson Road, Caloocan. UE Caloocan has the largest university campus in the CAMANAVA (Caloocan, Malabon, Navotas, Valenzuela) area. It has a parade ground and the university football field. Caloocan Campus will be the site for the university oval for athletic events.

UE Caloocan once became a venue for the UAAP beach volleyball games.

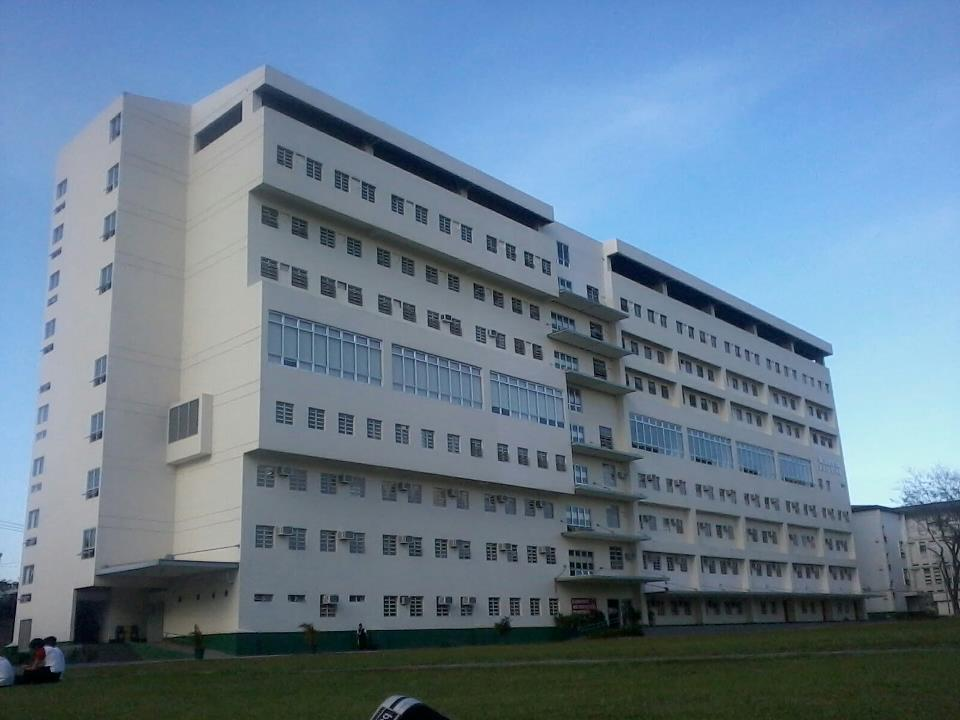
Dr. Lucio C. Tan Building

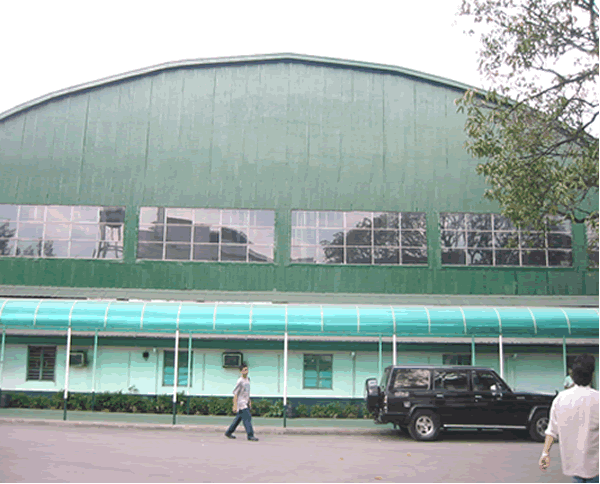
Gymnasium

Buildings

- Dr. Lucio C. Tan Building
- Tan Yan Kee Academic Building
- HRM Mock Hotel
- Administration Building
- College of Engineering Building
- Old Academic Building
- University Chapel
- University of the East-Caloocan Gymnasium

=== Tan Yan Kee Academic Building ===
Tan Yan Kee Academic Building was inaugurated in December 2003. It is named after the late Tan Yan Kee, the father of UE's honorary chairman, Dr. Lucio C. Tan. The Caloocan Campus Colleges of Business Administration, Arts and Sciences, and Fine Arts are housed in the TYK Academic Building. This six-storey edifice, which cost nearly 300 million pesos to build, has 54 air-conditioned classrooms, multimedia rooms, computer laboratories, a Gigabit Ethernet system, a parking area, the Benjamin G. Chua Jr. Library (in honor of the UE trustee with the same name), an information kiosk with info-retrieval machines, deans offices, faculty rooms, college offices, student council offices, two elevators, a cafeteria and a helipad.

=== Dr. Lucio C. Tan Building ===
Dr. Lucio C. Tan Building is a ten-story building and the new home of UE Caloocan's Elementary and High School Department or EHSD (Currently known as Basic Education Department or BED) kindergarten and elementary pupils and high school students. It was inaugurated on September 25, 2012. The edifice, named after UE's chairman of the board and chief executive officer, features modern classrooms and laboratories, a 500-seat multipurpose hall, a spacious library complete with multi-media facilities, and many more.

=== Engineering Building ===
The four-storey Engineering Building was inaugurated in 1980. What used to be the technical shops were gradually converted into classrooms for the students of the College of Arts and Sciences and the College of Business Administration until November 2003. It is a four-story building that houses over 50 lecture rooms, 24 laboratories and lab rooms, tool rooms and stock rooms, two machine shops and the campus's two multipurpose halls.

=== HRM Mock Hotel ===
Among the university's most recent infrastructure milestones is the HRM Building. It has two main parts: the mock hotel and the kitchen. The hotel is composed of reception area, travel area, dining area, suite, regular room (guest room), housekeeping room, and the skills laboratory. P6.3 million is the allotted budget for the building itself while the equipment for the kitchen costs about P8 million.

== Colleges ==
- College of Engineering (COE): The gradual transfer of the college from UE Manila started in 1984. It is now offered in both campuses.
- College of Arts and Sciences (CAS): The College of Arts and Sciences was initially a branch of CAS Manila in 1977.
- College of Business Administration (CBA): BA programs were offered in UE Caloocan starting 1976. CBA Caloocan was created in 1986.
- College of Fine Arts, Architecture and Design (CFAD): Founded on July 15, 1964, UE-CFAD was originally established at the UE Ramon Magsaysay Research Center for Sciences, Humanities and Culture located on Aurora Boulevard, Quezon City. The Cultural School embraced three disciplines in its Conservatory – Music, School of Fine Arts and the Ballet School. It was formally opened on August 3, 1964, and was later renamed the School of Music and Arts. In May 1981 the School of Music and the Ballet School were phased out and the School of Fine Arts became the sole cultural school of the university, it became a college in 1992.

== Library and research ==
- Benjamin C. Chua Jr. Library - On the Caloocan campus on the sixth floor of the Tan Yan Kee Academic Building. There are six sections in this main library: Circulation and Reserve, Periodicals, Filipiniana, Fine Arts, Reference, and Multimedia.
- Engineering Library Caloocan - The Engineering Library is on the third floor of the Engineering Building. It provides reference service and collections, which provide support to research and instruction of the civil, computer, mechanical, electronics and communications, and electrical engineering programs. The collection consists of over 18,000 volumes of books.
- LCT Library - The Elementary and High School Library is on the fifth floor of the Dr. Lucio C. Tan Building. It is equipped with a multimedia facility. it was inaugurated during the 66th anniversary of the university.

== Accreditations and affiliations ==
University of the East is an accredited member of national and international organizations:

- Philippine Accrediting Association of Schools, Colleges and Universities (PAASCU)
- Philippine Association of Colleges and Universities Commission on Accreditation (PACUCOA)
- Association of Southeast Asian Institutions of Higher Learning (ASAIHL)
- International Association of Universities (IAU)
- Federation of Accrediting Agencies of the Philippines (FAAP)
- Philippine Association of Colleges and Universities (PACU)
- University Athletic Association of the Philippines (UAAP)

== Offices and departments ==
=== Basic Education Department ===
The UE Caloocan Basic Education Department offers the standard K-12 basic education curriculum as prescribed by the Department of Education: Kindergarten and 12 years of basic education (six years of primary education, four years of Junior High School, and two years of Senior High School [SHS]).

- Pre-school Education
- Elementary Education
- Secondary Education (Regular and Science-based)
- Secondary Education (Senior High School)

=== Department of Registration and Records Management (DRRM) ===
The DRRM implements policies on enrollment, transfer and graduation of students, including the generation, storage and use of student records, and preparation of transcripts of records, certifications and diplomas/certificates. It takes charge of commencement and university-related exercises.

=== Management Information Systems Department (MISD) ===
The Management Information System Department is responsible for all matters related to computer-based information systems of the university, including the design and development of software and hardware needed in any academic, financial and personnel system and the training of users. The MISD, headed by its director, is also in charge of the supervision and maintenance of computer facilities of the university.

=== Admissions Office ===
The Admissions Office implements policies on admission and preliminaries to matriculation. Through an online admission system, it examines and processes the entrance credentials of freshmen applicants, transferees, degree holders and cross-enrollees seeking admission. It is also in charge of selecting qualified students for scholarships and other grants.

=== Office of Extension and Community Outreach (OECO) ===
The OECO is the lead office in integrating the community outreach programs and services of the colleges. This office takes charge of monitoring, evaluating and implementing the community involvement of students and faculty members on both campuses. It is also in charge of monitoring the Reserve Officers Training Corps (ROTC) and the Literacy and Civic Welfare Programs of their National Service Training Program (NSTP).

=== Security Office ===
The Security Office is tasked with the maintenance and protection of people and property in the academic community. It maintains close linkage with law enforcement agencies off-campus, to attain the rationale objectives the office was created for. There is a Security Office on each campus.
