= Marian Aleido =

Filipino brigadier-general and former Judge Advocate General

Judge Advocate General
- In office July 2012 – December 2014

Personal details
- Education: University of the East
- Occupation: Lawyer

Military service
- Allegiance: Philippines
- Branch/service: Army
- Years of service: 1984–2014
- Rank: Brigadier-general

Marian Aleido is a retired Filipino brigadier-general and former Judge Advocate General of the Armed Forces of the Philippines.

== Career ==
Marian Aleido was awarded a degree in law from the University of the East in 1979. When she joined the army in 1984 she became the first female lawyer to join the Armed Forces of the Philippines. In 1993 Aleido was appointed chief legal officer in the Office of the Inspector General and simultaneously deputy chief of the armed force's Office of Ethical Standards and Public Accountability.

Aleido was appointed Judge Advocate General in July 2012, the first woman to hold the position. She held the position for three years, simultaneously with that of officer in charge of the office of the provost marshal general. Aleido's aims during her tenure were to recruit more lawyers to work as legal advisers to the armed forces and the Department of National Defense and to increase the throughput of cases through the military court system. She was successful in the first regard, increasing the number of lawyer from 70 to 104. The number of female lawyers also increased during this time to 40. Aleido helped to speed up the trial of those accused of beheading Filipino marines in the 2007 Basilan beheading incident.

Aleido retired in 2014 after reaching 30 years service and received a testimonial parade.
