= Epitacio Tongohan =

Filipino artist and poet

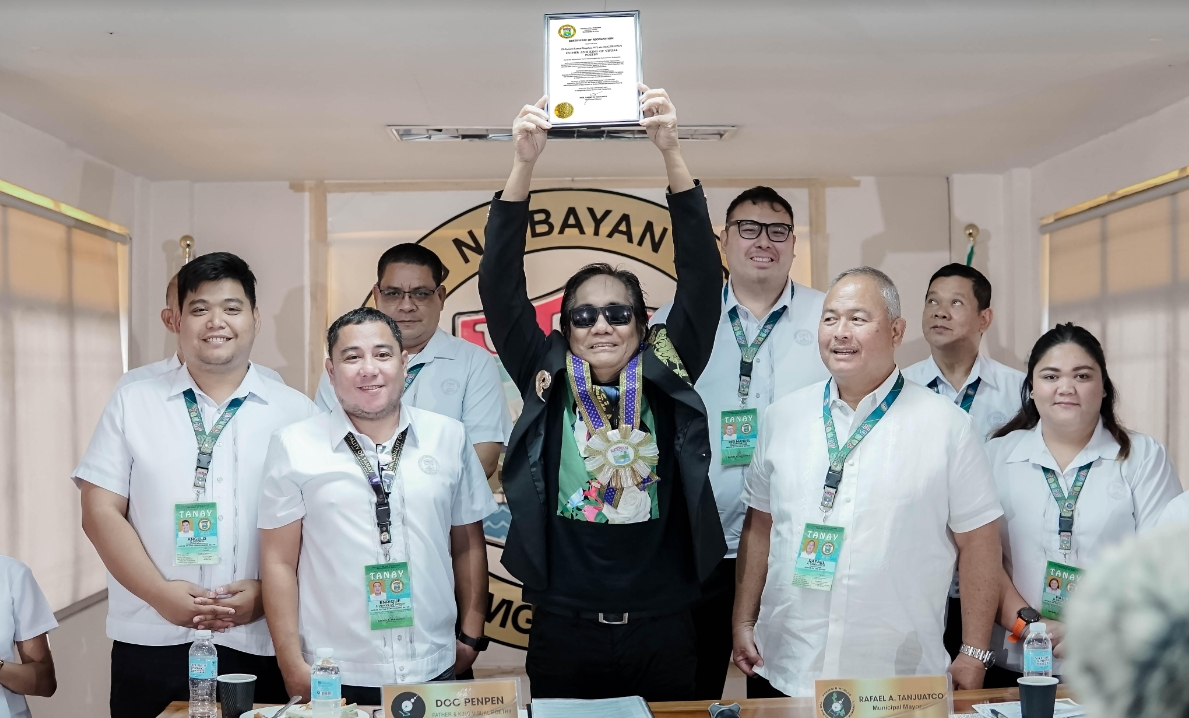
- Doc PenPen (center) at his conferment as 'Father and King of Visual Poetry' under Tanay Sangguniang Bayan Resolution No. 43 on February 22, 2024.
- Born: Epitacio Ramos Tongohan; November 19, 1958 (age 67)
- Education: University of Santo Tomas; University of the East
- Occupations: Medical doctor, poet, artist, entrepreneur
- Writing career
- Pen name: Doc PenPen Bugtong Takipsilim
- Years active: 2000-present
- Genre: Visual poetry
- Notable work: Pentasi B Poetry Volumes 1 - 3

Epitacio Ramos Tongohan (born 19 November 1958), also known as Doc PenPen Bugtong Takipsilim, or simply Doc Penpen, is a medical doctor, indie filmmaker and producer, artist, and poet from Tanay, Rizal, the Philippines. Tongohan has been called the "Father of Visual Poetry". He is the founder of the global organization of poets and artists Pentasi B World Friendship Poetry.

== Early life and education ==
Tongohan grew up in Tanay, a municipality in Rizal. A trained medical doctor specialising in anatomic pathology, he obtained his degree in Medical Technology from University of Santo Tomas in Manila in 1979. He got his Doctor of Medicine degree from the University of the East - Ramon Magsaysay Memorial Medical Center in 1984. He returned to UST for his post-doctorate studies specializing in Anatomic Pathology in 1988.

== Poetic style ==
As a visual poet, Tongohan's poetry is "controversial" as it does not follow the conventional way of writing poetry. A journalist and critic from the Philippines described Tongohan's poetry as "out of the box" His experimentation with words, symbols, and other elements has given his poetry "abstract" and "surrealist" characteristics.

An article published in an online newspaper in the Philippines said that Tongohan's poetry has "liberamorphic and therapeunigmatic" characteristics, based on the observations of a Zambaleno poet, Danilo E. Gallardo.

== Awards and recognitions ==
In 2013, Tongohan was given the title "Father of Visual Poetry" by different Filipino poets at the National Library of the Philippines during the Pentasi B Historical forum, organized by the National Library. Earlier, in 2011, he was awarded by OTUSA TV as the "Father of Philippine Visual Poetry", in an event held at the Grand Ballroom Cloud 9, in Antipolo City, Rizal. Chinese poets in Beijing also conferred the same title to Tongohan during the Pentasi B World Poetree in Beijing, China in 2020. Tongohan received numerous recognitions and accolades from prominent poetry groups worldwide, including the title "King of Visual Poetry", which has been given to him by poets in India. During that poetry festival, Tongohan has been able to meet the Indian Prime Minister Narendra Modi. Meanwhile, the Tanay local government, by virtue of Municipal Resolution No. 43, has nominated him to the Order of National Artist in Literature for his contribution to the development of visual poetry and local culture. In an article regarding the nomination of Tongohan to the Order of National Artist, it quoted the Municipal Mayor of Tanay, Rafael Tanjuatco discussing the merit of such nomination, saying: "Tongohan deserves to be a National Artist for Literature (Poetry) because he has shown a visionary commitment to global unity through the foundation of Pentasi B World Friendship Poetry which gained world acclaim, a revolutionary Filipino poet who has transformed the landscape of language, as a renowned Father of Visual Poetry by esteemed organizations worldwide..."

The late Filipino writer Rogelio L. Ordoñez praised Tongohan's visual poetry, saying that it surpassed Jose Garcia Villa's "comma poem".

== Philanthropy and advocacy ==
Tongohan is a philanthropist, donating to causes by having his work auctioned and through the sales of his books and paintings. His Pentasi B poetry book was sold for US$30,000 to finance education of less privileged youths in the Philippines. He also solely financed the Pentasi B Award for deserving poets and creatives worldwide.

Tongohan is seen by some poets as an advocate for the democratization of poetry. Tongohan defended flip top, a controversial form of poetry, saying flip top is, "in a way, a revolution of the literary tradition or form," adding "it has elements of literature but the way it delivered something very earthshaking and revolutionary."
