= Philippine College of Commerce and Business Administration =

The Philippine College of Commerce and Business Administration (PCCBA) is the former name of the University of the East, Manila, Philippines. Established in 1946.

On September 11, 1946, five people from the Far Eastern University, namely Francisco Dalupan, Sr., Hermenegildo B. Reyes, José L. Torres, Jaime Hernández and Santiago de la Cruz established the Philippine College of Commerce and Business Administration (PCCBA). Four days later, it was deemed a corporation existing under Philippine law.

A business educator himself, Francisco Dalupan establish PCCBA in two rented rooms along Dasmarinas Street, Manila. The success of its CPA reviewers, four of whom secured the top four post and 100 passers out of the 110 enrolled, made the humble review center popular.

The opening of the next classes on the summer of 1947 received an overwhelming twofold number of its original enrollees. This prompted the founders to relocate the center at R. Papa Street, Manila. Once again, PCCBA dominated the CPA exams, attracting larger number of enrollees and gaining the 1947 Business School of the Year Award.

In a matter of five years, PCCBA experienced a hundred percent expansion in enrollment, which led to the establishment of its first building. After purchasing a lot on Azcarraga Street, the main building is built on January 10, 1948. The PCCBA opened its College of Liberal Arts, Education, Dentistry and Graduate School. On July 3, 1951, PCCBA was granted the University status and was named the University of the East, as it was located at the East side of Azcarraga Street (now C.M. Recto Avenue). Dr. Dalupan was named the Chairman of the Board and the University President. This was the decade when UE expanded in land area, acquiring a 5 hectare land in Caloocan and another 1.5 hectare land in Quezon City.
