= Persida Acosta =

Filipino lawyer

Persida Acosta DSD JD
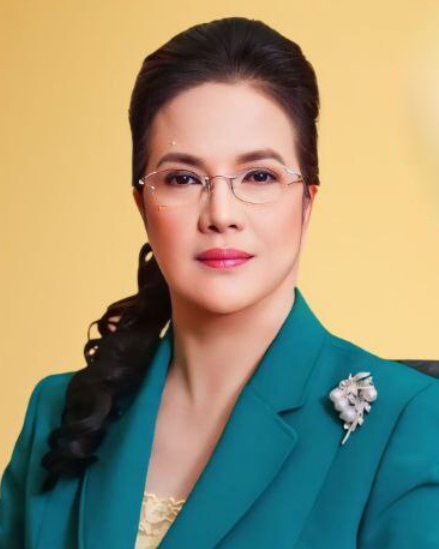
- Official portrait

Chief Public Attorney of the Philippines
- Incumbent
- Assumed office February 23, 2001
- President: Gloria Macapagal Arroyo; Benigno Aquino III; Rodrigo Duterte; Bongbong Marcos

Personal details
- Born: Persida V. Rueda; August 15, 1961 (age 65) Mariveles, Bataan, Philippines
- Spouse: Benedicto Acosta
- Children: 2
- Education: University of the East (BS, LLB); University of the Philippines Diliman (DSD); Ateneo de Manila University
- Profession: Lawyer

Persida Venturina Rueda-Acosta (born August 15, 1961) is a Filipino lawyer who has served as the chief of the Public Attorney's Office (PAO) under the Department of Justice since 2001.

== Early life and education ==
Acosta was born in August 15, 1961 in Cabcaben, Mariveles, Bataan, to Florencio and Herminia Rueda. She was the fourth of nine siblings. Her father worked as a mini-bus driver in Bataan, while her mother was a dressmaker. She was class valedictorian in both elementary and high school. In college, she was a consistent dean’s lister at the University of the East, where she graduated cum laude with a Bachelor of Science degree.

She attended the Ateneo de Manila University School of Law on a scholarship but was forced to leave in her third year because her parents were unable to afford the school fees. She transferred to and graduated at the University of the East College of Law in 1987. She was a Dr. Antonio del Castillo Memorial Scholar and President Dalupan Scholar. Acosta holds a Doctor of Social Development degree from the University of the Philippines Diliman, where she was honored with the Gawad Chanselor Award. Acosta passed the 1989 Philippine bar examinations, placing fourth overall.

She completed the Senior Executive Fellows Program, as well as the Senior Executive Program on National and International Security, and a Certificate in Public Financial Management at the Harvard Kennedy School, Massachusetts, United States. She also earned a Professional Certificate in International Management and Leadership from the International Centre for Parliamentary Studies in London. Acosta attended the Salzburg Global Seminar, as a fellow, in 2009 and 2023.

== Career ==
Acosta began her legal career in 1990 as a clerk of court at Branch 96 of the Regional Trial Court in Quezon City. She served as a public attorney at the Public Attorney's Office from 1990 to 1993. From 1993 to 2001, she was a partner at the Rueda-Acosta and Associates Law Office. She has served the chief public attorney since 2001.

Acosta was a professor at the Ateneo de Manila University School of Law, as well as at the University of the East, San Sebastian College – Recoletos de Cavite, New Era University, and Bulacan State University.

=== Public Attorney's Office (2001–present) ===
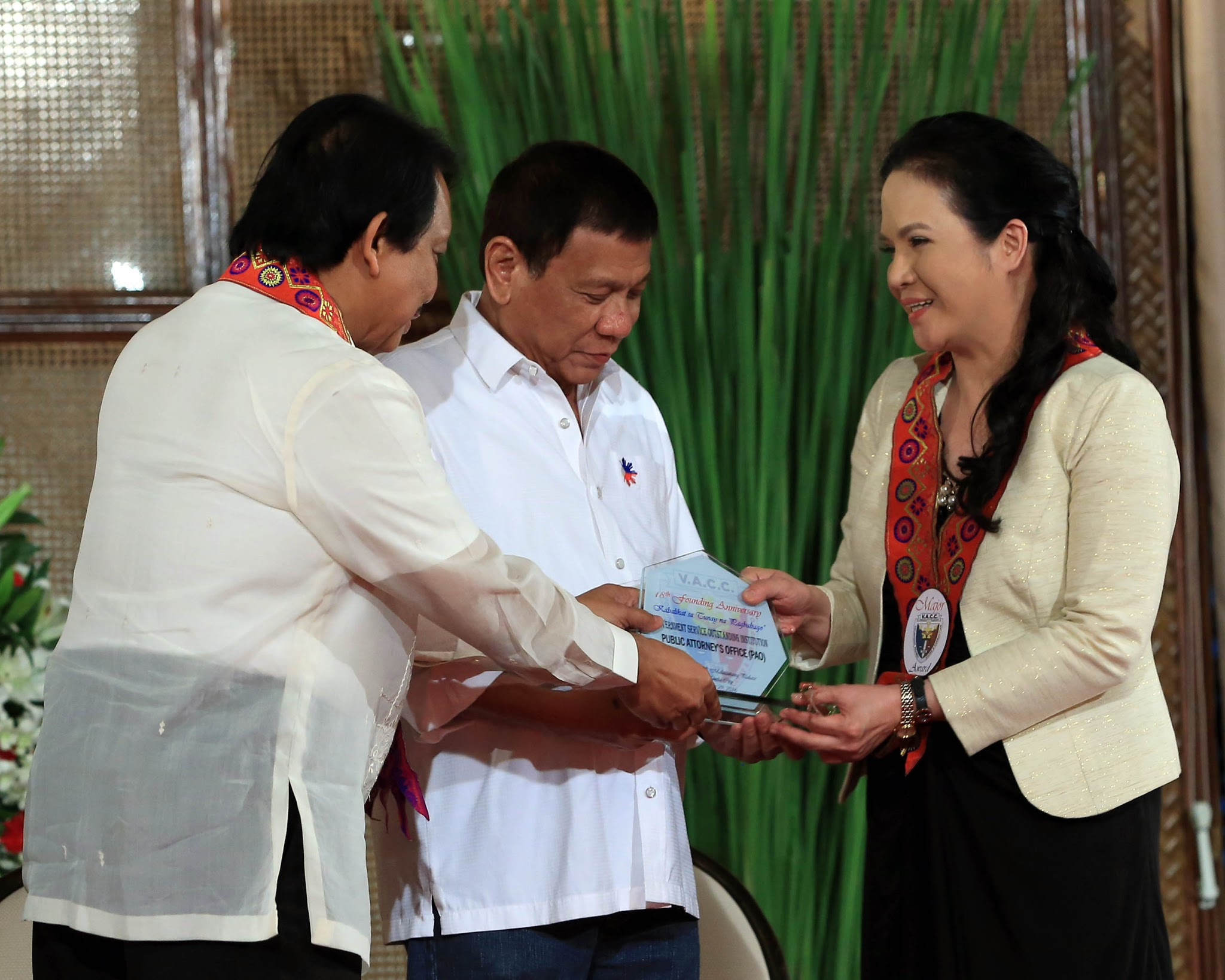
President Rodrigo Duterte awards to PAO Chief Acosta the Outstanding Individual for Government Service during the 18th anniversary celebration of Volunteers Against Crime and Corruption on August 29, 2016.

On February 23, 2001, then-President Gloria Macapagal-Arroyo appointed Acosta to head the Citizen’s Legal Assistance Office, which was renamed the Public Attorney's Office in 2006. Since then, she has served under the Benigno Aquino III, Rodrigo Duterte and Bongbong Marcos administrations.

On August 29, 2016, during the Duterte administration, Acosta was awarded the title Outstanding Individual for Individual Government Service. In July 2016, she defended the police regarding deaths at the beginning of the Philippine drug war, stating that they were "almost negligible." Subsequently, Acosta became the legal counsel for Kian delos Santos, a teenage boy killed in an anti-drug police operation.

=== Remark on the CPRA ===
In 2023, the Supreme Court issued a show cause order against Acosta after she criticized the Code of Professional Responsibility and Accountability (CPRA). After Acosta apologized, she issued an order for public attorneys to follow the Supreme Court's new code of conduct. The Supreme Court, in an en banc judgment promulgated on February 28, 2024, fined Acosta PHP 30,000 for indirect contempt of court and PHP 150,000 for grossly undignified conduct prejudicial to the administration of justice. PAO forensics expert Erwin Erfe was also fined PHP 10,000 for similar statements.

== Personal life ==
Acosta is married to fellow lawyer Benedicto M. Acosta, with whom she has two children.
