= Francisco Dalupan Sr. =

Filipino educator and founder of the University of the East (1895–1987)

- Born: Francisco Tarnate Dalupan Sr. October 4, 1895
- Died: November 25, 1987 (aged 92)
- Education: Ateneo de Manila University
- Occupations: Educator, university administrator
- Known for: Founder and first president of the University of the East
- Children: Virgilio "Baby" Dalupan

Francisco Tarnate Dalupan Sr. (October 4, 1895 – November 25, 1987) was the Filipino founder and first chairman and the president of the University of the East (UE). He was the father of the legendary Filipino basketball coach Virgilio "Baby" Dalupan.

Dalupan graduated from the Ateneo de Manila University. Before founding UE, he co-founded the Far Eastern University, which was headed by Nicanor B. Reyes, Sr., then serving as a professor at the University of the Philippines Department of Economics.

Together with his colleagues, Dalupan established the Philippine College of Commerce and Business Administration (PCCBA) at R. Papa Street, Sampaloc, Manila in 1946. The PCCBA admitted 350 students in the summer of 1947. The following year, more students enrolled and so more academic units had to be organized, and the PCCBA moved to what is now UE's main campus on Claro M. Recto Avenue.

The PCCBA was granted university status on July 3, 1951 and was renamed the University of the East. Dalupan became UE's first president and the chairman of its board of trustees. The first members of the board were Atty. Hermenegildo Balbino Reyes, a businessman, scholar and former vice president of the University of the Philippines, and Santiago F. de la Cruz, a certified public accountant and business executive who later succeeded Dalupan as UE President.
