= Hermenegildo Reyes =

Filipino educator, lawyer, engineer, and Boy Scout leader (1898–1983)

Sir Hermenegildo B. Reyes KGCR
- Born: Hermenegildo Balbino Reyes; March 31, 1898; Malolos, Bulacan, Philippines
- Died: October 30, 1983
- Education: Cornell University; University of the Philippines Manila; Ateneo de Manila
- Occupations: Educator, Lawyer, Mechanical Engineer, Electrical Engineer, Civil Engineer
- Parent(s): Vicente Tantoco Reyes (father); Olympia San Agustin-Reyes (mother)

Sir Hermenegildo Balbino Tantoco Reyes, KGCR (March 31, 1898 – October 30, 1983) was a Filipino educator, lawyer and engineer who co-founded the University of the East. Reyes served on the World Scout Committee of the World Organization of the Scout Movement from 1961 to 1967.

== Early life ==
Reyes was born in Malolos, Bulacan, to Vicente Tantoco Reyes and his wife, Olympia San Agustin-Reyes. He is the cousin of Dr. Nicanor B. Reyes Sr. (founder of Far Eastern University) and Engr. Hermenegildo Roque Reyes Sr. (founder of Central Colleges of the Philippines).

== Education ==
Reyes graduated from Ateneo de Manila University magna cum laude with a Bachelor of Arts in 1914. He earned his LL.B from the University of the Philippines in Manila; thereafter being admitted to the Integrated Bar of the Philippines on November 18, 1935. He graduated in Mechanical Engineering with a certificate in Electrical Engineering in 1918 and graduated with a Master of Mechanical Engineering from Cornell University, New York in 1919. Reyes was a junior member of the American Society of Mechanical Engineers and a member of the American Institute of Electrical Engineers. Reyes was a member of the Cornell chapters of Tau Veta Pi engineering honour society, Eta Kappa Nu honour society of the Institute of Electrical and Electronics Engineers and Sigma Xi, the scientific research honor society.

From 1947 to 1949, Reyes was president of the UP Alumni Engineers Association.

== Career ==
In 1918, Reyes was appointed assistant professor of the University of the Philippines Mechanical and Electrical Engineering Department. In 1919, Reyes was a tester for General Electric Co. From 1919 to 1920, he was an assistant electrical designer at The Philadelphia Electric Company. From 1920 to 1921, Reyes was an assistant mechanic and electronic designing engineer ath the Bureau of Public Works. In 1934, Reyes was a member of National Research Council of the Philippine Islands. In 1939, Reyes became chairman of the Division of Engineering and Industrial Research for the National Research Council of the Philippines.

Reyes served as the Far Eastern University's second university president from 1945 to 1946 when it re-opened after World War II. In 1951, he co-founded the University of the East and served as one of its board members.

From 1955 to 1956, Reyes was a member of the executive committee of the Second National Eucharistic Congress of the Philippines which was held in 1956, in Manila, from 28 November to 2 December. Reyes and fellow electrical engineer and acting Chief Scout and President Don Gabriel Daza were in charge of planning the event.

Reyes was also involved with national institutions. In 1952, President Elpidio Quirino appointed Reyes as vice president of the Manila Electric Company. In 1955, Reyes was a member of both the Economic Planning Board and National Power Board under President Ramon Magsaysay.

Reyes was also a Trustee of the Knights of Columbus Fraternal Association of the Philippines Inc.

== Personal life ==
Reyes married Pacita "Paz" T. Adriano on November 2, 1920, in Manila. They had a daughter named Rosario.

== Awards ==
The Philippines:

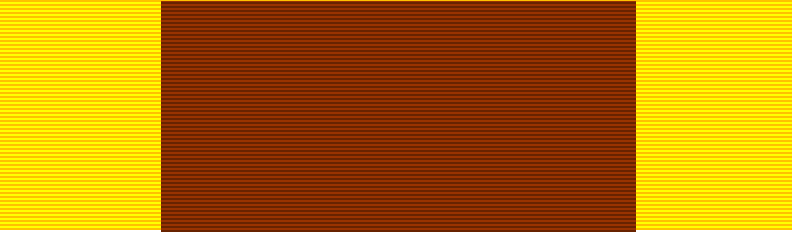
- Supreme Commander and Knight Grand Cross of the Order of the Knights of Rizal.

Boy Scouts:

- Bronze Wolf awarded by the World Scout Conference in1967.
