= Public Attorney's Office (Philippines) =

Public defender in Philippines courts

- Tanggapan ng Abogado ng Bayan

Agency overview
- Formed: October 23, 1972; 54 years ago as Citizen's Legal Assistance Office
- Jurisdiction: Philippines
- Employees: 3,518 (2024)
- Agency executive: Persida Acosta, Chief Public Attorney
- Parent department: Department of Justice
- Website: pao.gov.ph

The Public Attorney's Office (PAO; Filipino: Tanggapan ng Abogado ng Bayan ) is the public defender for all courts in the Philippines. It also provides other legal services to the poor. According to its mission statement it exists to provide to the poor "free access to courts, judicial and quasi-judicial agencies, by rendering legal services, counselling [sic] and assistance".

It is an attached agency of the Department of Justice (DOJ). It is led by chief public attorney Persida Acosta, who was appointed to the position on February 23, 2001, by President Gloria Macapagal Arroyo.

== History ==
PAO was previously known as the Citizen's Legal Assistance Office (CLAO) which was created as a body under the Department of Justice (DOJ) in 1972 under the Integrated Reorganization Plan. It is mandated to provide free legal assistance to indigent people.

In 2006, the CLAO was renamed as the Public Attorney's Office (PAO) through Republic Act 9406. The renamed body retained its mandate.

== List of chief public attorneys ==
PAO is headed by the chief public attorney, whose tenure is not defined by law.

| Portrait | Name | Took office | Left office | Office | President | Ref. |
|---|---|---|---|---|---|---|
| | Reynold Fajardo | 1975 | October 1997 | Citizens' Legal Assistance Office | Ferdinand Marcos | |
| | Reynold Fajardo | 1975 | October 1997 | Citizens' Legal Assistance Office | Corazon Aquino | |
| | Reynold Fajardo | 1975 | October 1997 | Public Attorney's Office | Fidel V. Ramos | |
| | Persida Acosta | 1975 | October 1997 | Public Attorney's Office | Gloria Macapagal Arroyo | |
| | Persida Acosta | February 23, 2001 | incumbent | Public Attorney's Office | Gloria Macapagal Arroyo | |
| | Persida Acosta | February 23, 2001 | incumbent | Public Attorney's Office | Benigno Aquino III | |
| | Persida Acosta | February 23, 2001 | incumbent | Public Attorney's Office | Rodrigo Duterte | |
| | Persida Acosta | February 23, 2001 | incumbent | Public Attorney's Office | Bongbong Marcos | |

== See also ==
- Public defender
