= University of the East =

Private university in Manila, Philippines

- Pamantasan ng Silangan (Filipino)
- Former names: Philippine College of Commerce and Business Administration (1946–1951)
- Motto: Tomorrow Begins in the East
- Type: Private, nonsectarian, research, coeducation, autonomous university, basic and higher education institution
- Established: September 11, 1946; 80 years ago
- Founders: Francisco Dalupan Sr. Hermenegildo B. Reyes; Santiago de la Cruz; José L. Torres; Zosimo Enid Mapa
- Academic affiliations: ASAIHL; IAU; FAAP; PACU; PAASCU; PACUCOA
- Chairman: Dr. Lucio C. Tan, Sr.
- Chancellor: Louie A. Divinagracia; Victor R. Macam Jr.
- President: Zosimo M. Battad
- Undergraduates: 35,000
- Location: 2219 Claro M. Recto Avenue, Manila, Philippines; 14°36′07″N 120°59′22″E
- Campus: Urban Main campus: Manila (5.2 ha (52,000 m^{2})) Satellite campuses: Caloocan, Metro Manila (4.86 ha (48,600 m^{2})); Quezon City, Metro Manila (1.6 ha (16,000 m^{2})); Santa Rosa, Laguna (19 ha (190,000 m^{2}))
- Alma Mater song: Pamantasan Ka Naming Mahal (The UE Hymn)
- Colors: Red & white
- Nicknames: Red Warriors; Lady Red Warriors; Junior Red Warriors
- Sporting affiliations: UAAP
- Mascot: Red Warrior
- Website: ue.edu.ph

- Location in Manila Location in Metro Manila Location in Luzon Location in the Philippines

The University of the East (UE; Filipino: Pamantasan ng Silangan) is a private university located in Manila, Philippines. Founded in 1946, business tycoon Lucio Tan acquired the university in 1990. UE was once labeled as the "largest university in Asia" when its enrollment in the past reached over 65,000 students.

The Commission on Higher Education (CHED) granted UE autonomous status and recognized 2 of its programs as Center of Excellence and 1 program as Center of Development. UE offers degree programs from basic education to graduate studies. UE has two other campuses, one in Caloocan, and its medical school, the UE Ramon Magsaysay Memorial Medical Center located in Aurora Blvd., Dona Imelda, Quezon City.

== History ==
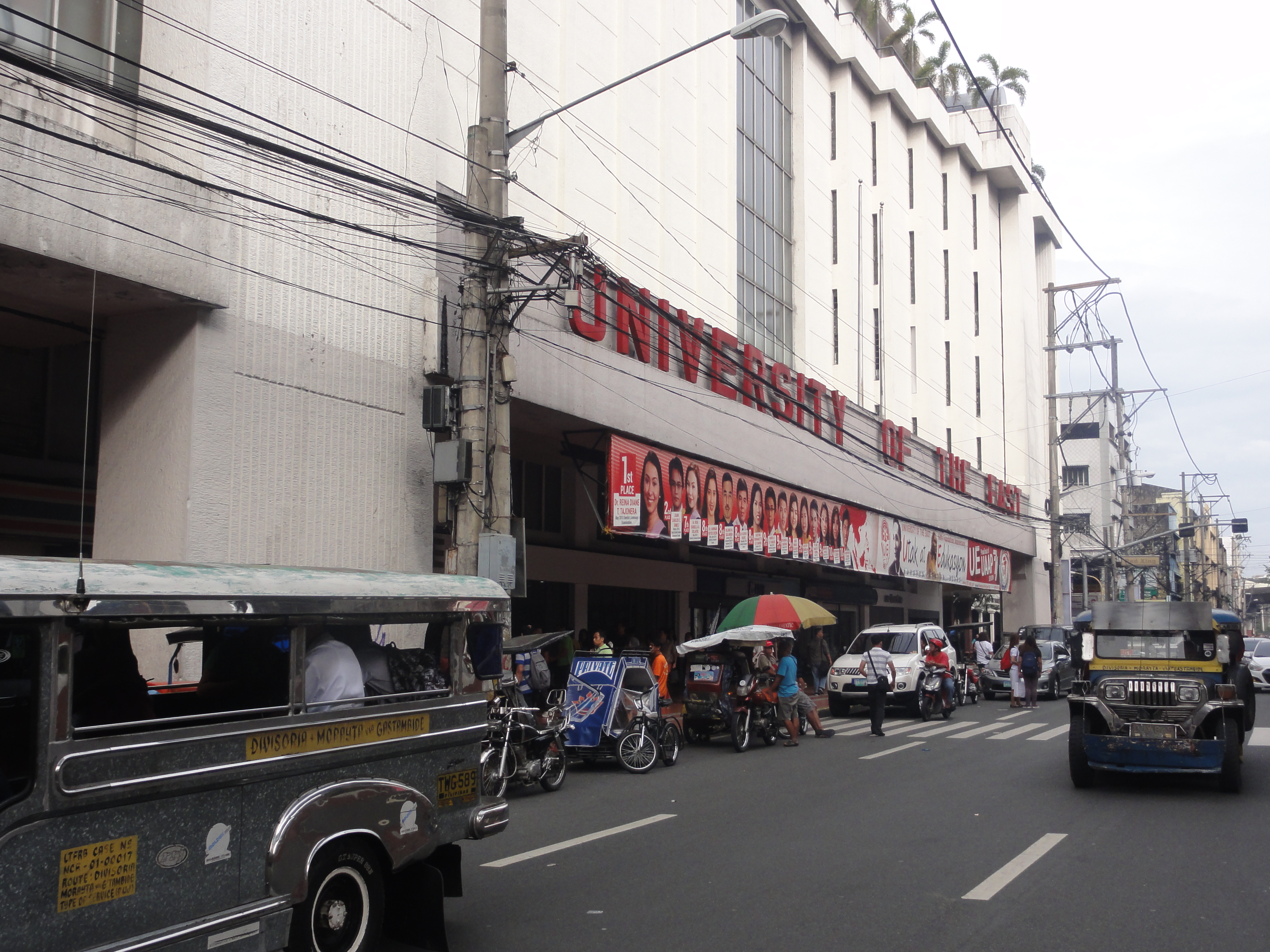
UE Manila facade along Recto Avenue

Panfilo O. Domingo Center for IT Hall, Manila

UE Caloocan Campus

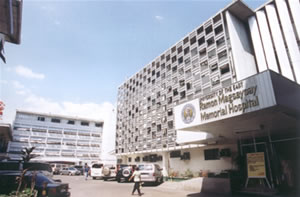
UERM Medical Center

The history of the University of the East starts in September 1946, in a rented room on Dasmariñas Street, Manila, where 110 students enrolled in Certified Public Accountant (CPA) review classes. The group of business teachers led by Dr. Francisco T. Dalupan, Sr. that started the sessions made it their objective to help the country, which was still reeling from the war. Of the 110 students, four made it to top spots in the 1947 CPA board Examinations.

On September 11, 1946, five educators - namely Dr. Francisco T. Dalupan Sr., Dr. Hermengildo B. Reyes, José L. Torres, Enid Mapa and Santiago de la Cruz—established the Philippine College of Commerce and Business Administration (PCCBA) along R. Papa St. in Sampaloc, Manila. The PCCBA admitted 350 students in the summer of 1947. The following year, more students enrolled and more academic units were organized, and the PCCBA moved to what is now UE's main campus on 2219 Claro M. Recto Avenue.

PCCBA alumni performed successfully in the government's accountancy examinations. Because of this success, the government granted the PCCBA permission to establish other colleges, leading to the establishment of the Colleges of Liberal Arts, Business Administration, Dentistry, and the Graduate School of Business Administration.

The PCCBA was granted university status on July 4, 1951, and was renamed the University of the East. Dalupan became UE's first president and chairman of its board of trustees. The first members of the Board were Dr. Hermenegildo Balbino Reyes, a businessman, scholar, and former Vice President of the University of the Philippines; Santiago F. de la Cruz, a CPA and business executive who later succeeded Dalupan as UE president; José L. Torres, a soldier, businessman, and accountant; and Jaime Hernández, former Secretary of Finance.

The succeeding years saw the opening of the colleges of Law, Medicine, and Engineering, as well as the Graduate School of Education. The Graduate School later merged with the Graduate School of Business Administration.

In June 1954, UE opened a new campus, then known as UE Tech, on a 4.86-hectare lot along Samson Road in Caloocan. UE Caloocan, which is now academically autonomous, is headed by a chancellor. The new Tan Yan Kee Academic Building houses the colleges of Arts and Sciences, Business Administration, and Fine Arts, whereas the College of Engineering has its own building. The UE Caloocan grounds have been used for ROTC and CAT instruction since 1986.

In 1955, the UE purchased a one-hectare lot along Aurora Boulevard in Quezon City, where it established the College of Medicine. On May 17, 1957, the college was converted into a Foundation and named the UE Ramon Magsaysay Memorial Medical Center (UERMMMC).

In 1962, the university acquired a 5,850-square-meter (63,000 sq ft) lot across UERMMMC. This became the Research Center for Sciences, Humanities and Culture, which is home to two buildings. One housed the School of Music and Arts and the Ballet School while the other housed the College of Dentistry and research laboratories. The School of Music and Arts, now the College of Fine Arts, moved to the Caloocan campus in 1981. On the mid-1960s Dalupan commissioned the National Artist Guillermo Tolentino to create the symbol of every UEian, the Lualhati from the figure of CBA student Ophelia Salas. The College of Dentistry moved to the Recto (Manila) campus in school year 1988–1989.

In 1967, former President Diosdado Macapagal decided to teach part-time in the College of Business Administration and branded UE as the "People's University".

Together with the expansion came rapid growth in enrollment. From the original 110 students in 1946, the student population steadily grew each year until 1960, when UE became the first Philippine university to have an enrollment of over 60,000. The highest enrollment record was achieved during the first semester of school year 1975–1976, with 67,443 students registered. Today, the body of UE alumni is over a million.

The economic crisis and recession that hit the Philippines in the 1980s did not spare UE. The devaluation of the peso, rising inflation, the high cost of wages, coupled with faculty, personnel and student strikes affected UE. Enrollment declined. This period intensified into a crisis that almost led to the school's being sold to a foreign religious group. Financial trouble and academic decline continued to burden UE throughout the 1980s. For a brief period in 1984, a controlling interest in the university was held by an entity of Maharishi Mahesh Yogi's Transcendental Meditation movement. Students boycotted classes and held protests against the takeover, and in short time control was returned to stakeholders.

Dr. Isidro D. Cariño, who became UE president in 1984, began applying measures that included personnel reduction, cost-cutting measures, and renting out school premises and facilities on short- and long-term leases. UE began offering a ladderized curriculum, a special course for executives, programs from the Institute for Computer Studies and Systems, and scholarships for accounting and engineering students. The lease of facilities enabled UE to hold back tuition fee increases in 1986–1987 and 1987–1988.

When Cariño was appointed Secretary of Education, Culture and Sports in 1990, Panfilo O. Domingo, former president of Philippine National Bank, took over as chairman of the board of trustees and became chief executive officer and acting president of the university.

Domingo immediately worked to cure the financial ills of the university by retiring its short-term debts and instituting fiscal and operational reforms. Within five years, the university's loans were substantially reduced and the long-accumulated operating deficit was eliminated from the books. At the same time, Domingo began a massive rehabilitation of UE's infrastructure and academics.

Lucio C. Tan heavily invested in education, buying the university in 1990. In 1992, former Treasurer of the Philippines Rosalina S. Cajucom became UE President. After she retired in mid-1995, Domingo reassumed the presidency until the appointment of Dr. Josefina R. Cortes to the position in 1997. She was succeeded by Mr. Baltazar N. Endriga following her 2003 retirement.

The university was labeled as "One of the Most Wired Universities in the Country" by Computerworld and Enterprise Magazine. Featured in the 2006 Computerworld Premier 100 of Computer World Magazine, the university ranked 15 among the top 100 corporations and companies in the use of Information Technology and is the only educational institution on the list.

The university migrated from ATM to Gigabit Ethernet at its Manila campus with an Ethernet networking solution from Nortel Networks. The upgrade will significantly improve speed and performance of student and faculty access to online learning resources and academic records. The upgrade will also support the university's plan for a unified communications network ultimately linking the Manila facility with campuses in Caloocan and Quezon City.

On October 6, 2009, the Commission on Higher Education granted the Autonomous Status to the UE-Manila campus.

On September 25, 2012, the university inaugurated the Dr. Lucio C. Tan Building, an eight-story building and the new home of UE Caloocan's Elementary and High School Department (EHSD). The edifice, named after UE's chairman of the board and chief executive officer, features modern classrooms and laboratories, a 500-seater multipurpose hall, and a library with multi-media facilities.

By the second semester of S.Y. 2014–2015, College of Dentistry moved to the new seven-storey building extension campus formerly part formerly of Ever Gotesco Manila Plaza along Recto Avenue in Quiapo, near the Manila campus, while the Old Dentistry Building is now used mostly by Senior High School.

== Campus ==
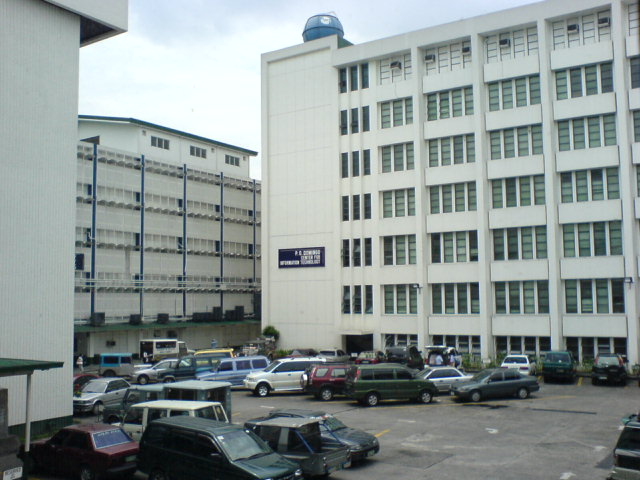
POD-CIT building Square, Manila

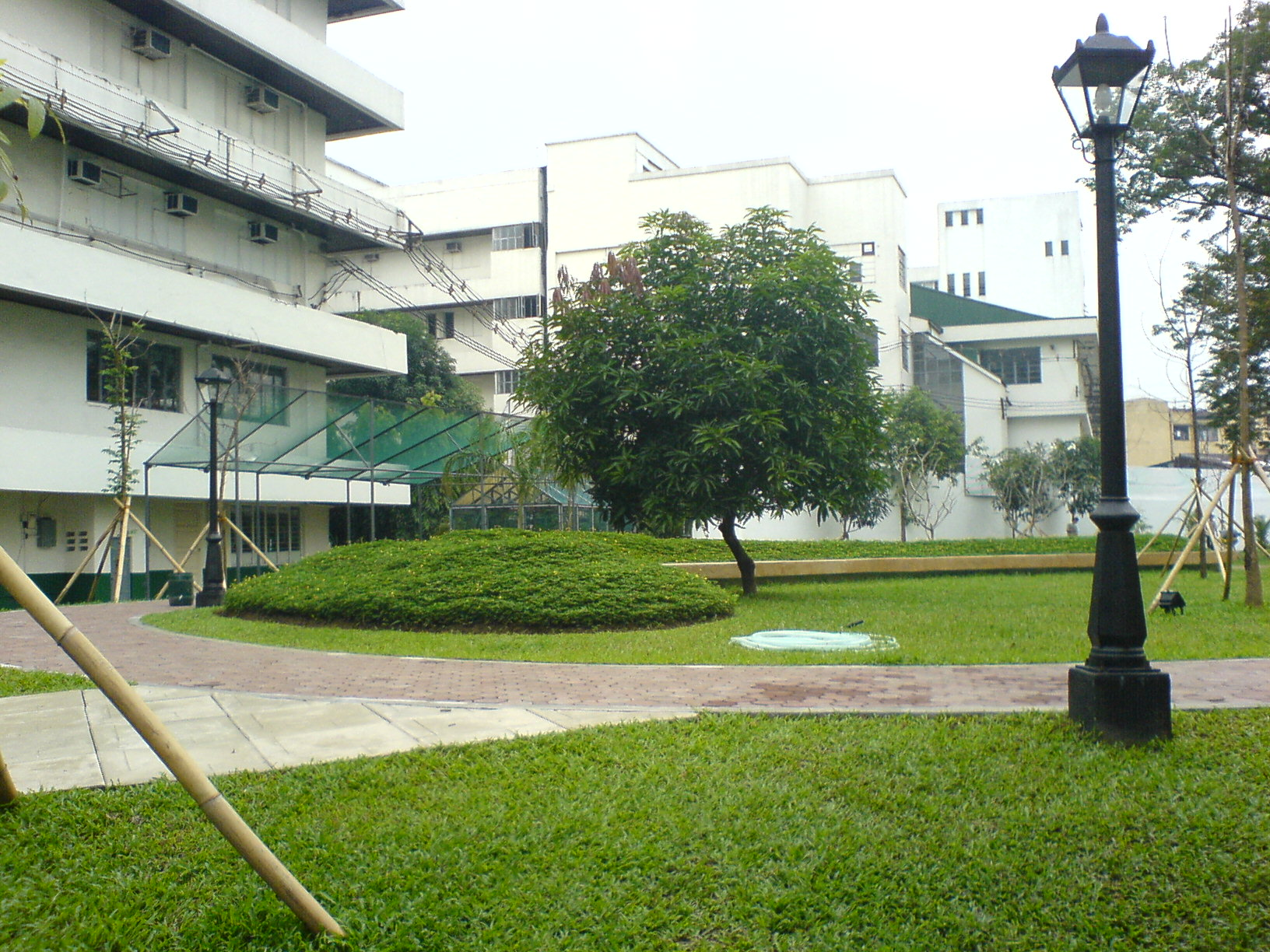
Tan Yan Kee Garden

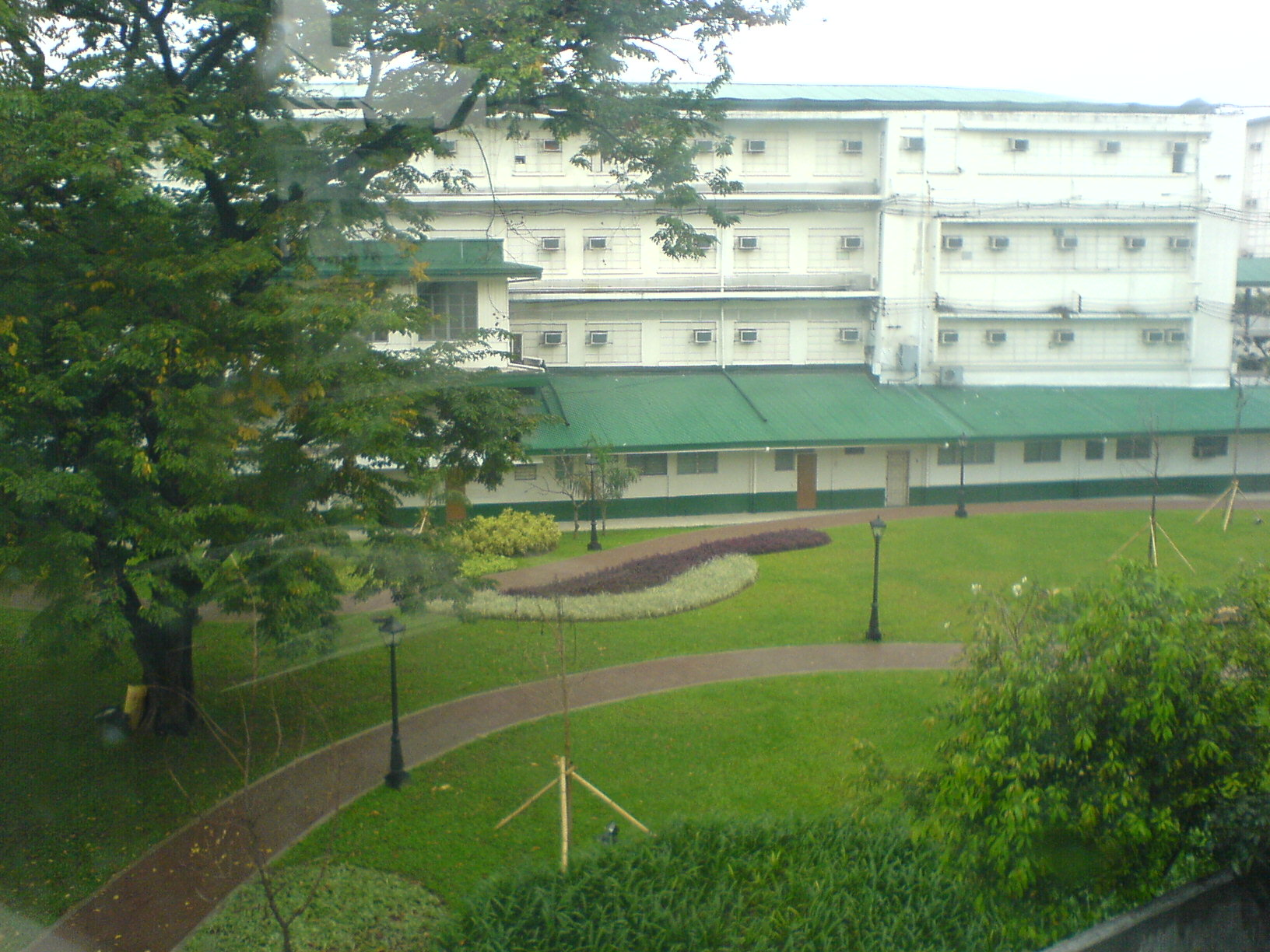
Santiago dela Cruz building

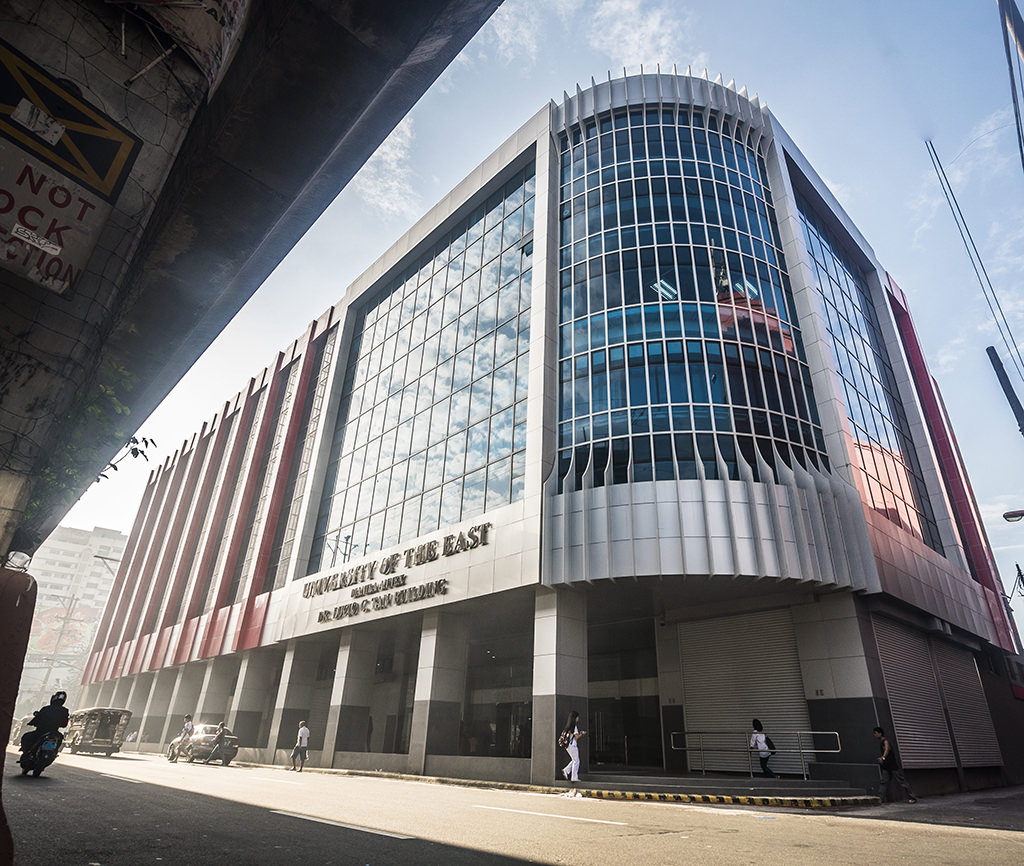
UE Manila Annex, Dr. Lucio C. Tan Building

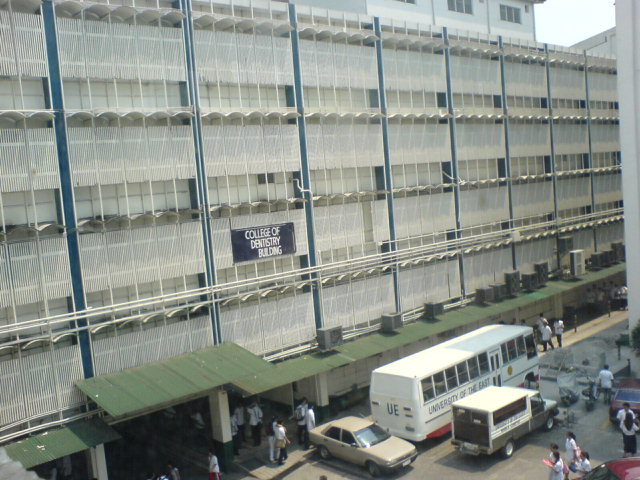
College of Dentistry

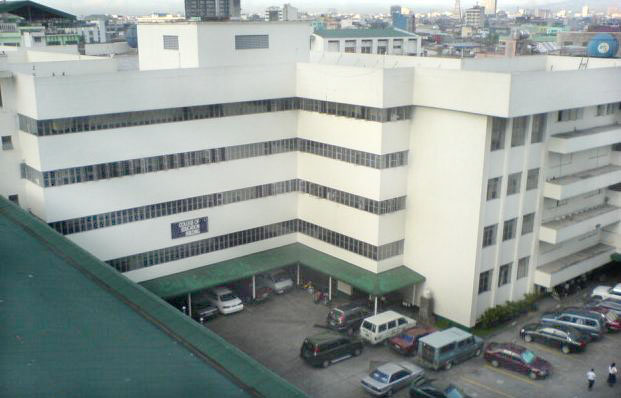
College of Education

=== Manila campus ===
The UE Manila Campus (main campus) consists of twelve buildings, located on the heart of University Belt area, Sampaloc, Manila. The campus faces Claro M. Recto Avenue, near Mendiola Street and Legarda station. All of the campuses are fully integrated with the Smart ID System. One of the beautification projects of the university is the construction of the Tan Yan Kee Garden.

In 2013, An Annex was up diagonally across UE's Manila Campus along Recto Avenue, Dr. Lucio C. Tan Building, home of UE College of Dentistry.

The building has six floors and a mezzanine and features various facilities and equipment—including a variety of dental laboratory facilities, four specialty clinics, 253 dental chairs, a variety of simulator equipment and specialized machines, two auditoriums, four lecture rooms, a multipurpose hall and a parking area. The building was inaugurated on December 8, 2014.

On April 2, 2016, a fire broke out on the second floor of the UE College of Arts and Science Building. The Engineering Building and the University Chapel also caught fire, leaving the three buildings in ruins. The groundbreaking ceremony on May 22, 2017, for new Lualhati Building to be erected at the footprint of these buildings.

The Lualhati Building stands 10 floors tall, and houses five Colleges: the UE College of Business Administration, the UE College of Arts and Sciences - Manila, the UE College of Computer Studies and Systems, the UE College of Education, and the UE College of Engineering - Manila, as well as the new University Chapel.

In line with the construction of this new building, the university is modernizing its Manila Campus with the aid of a new masterplan. The campus masterplan designed for the university aims to rationalize, modernize, and create a safer, more secure, and sustainable campus for the UE community. The redesign of the masterplan involves the introduction of outdoor relaxation and recreation areas, and better circulation networks.

A ceremonial turnover of the Lualhati Building was held on September 30, 2021, as part of UE's 75th Foundation Anniversary.

=== Satellite campuses ===
- University of the East Caloocan is located in Caloocan, along Samson Road. It is an autonomous unit headed by a Chancellor with College of Business Administration, College of Arts and Sciences, College of Engineering, College of Fine Arts, Architecture and Design, and Elementary and High School Department. UE Caloocan is called Caloocan Campus to distinguish it from the Manila Campus on Recto Avenue. All of the Colleges are also present at the Manila Campus except the College of Fine Arts.
  - On September 12, 2012, the university inaugurated the Dr. Lucio C. Tan Building - Caloocan Campus. It is a ten-story building that houses the Basic Education Department (Formerly known as Elementary and High School Department or EHSD). The edifice was named after UE's chairman of the board and chief executive officer.
- University of the East Ramon Magsaysay Memorial Medical Center (UERMMMC) is located in Quezon City, along Aurora Boulevard. UERMMMC is a non-stock, non-profit foundation and a memorial to President Ramon Magsaysay since 1957. It has five colleges, namely College of Medicine, College of Nursing, College of Allied Rehabilitation Sciences, College of Medical Technology and Graduate School.
- University of the East Eton Laguna Campus is a 19-hectare (47-acre) satellite campus and hospital located in Eton City, Santa Rosa, Laguna. Its groundbreaking was held on April 11, 2016 (as UE Laguna) and on October 15, 2025.

== Academics ==
=== Colleges ===
The UE College of Medicine and College of Computer Studies and Systems were awarded as Centers of Excellence in Medicine and Information Technology, respectively, and the College of Nursing was awarded as Center of Development by the Commission on Higher Education. It has a total of 50 academic programs or 93% of the academic programs of the university are now accredited or under accreditation: 34 in Manila and 16 in Caloocan. Most of the programs accredited by Philippine Association of Colleges and Universities Commission on Accreditation (PACUCOA).

=== Graduate school ===
The UE Graduate School resulted from the 1982 merging of the Graduate School of Business and the Graduate School of Education. At present, the UE Graduate School offers Masteral and Doctorate degree programs in the fields of Business, Education, Public Administration, Sciences, Construction Management, Philosophy, Dentistry, and Information Management.

The University of the East Ramon Magsaysay Memorial Medical Center (UERMMMC) Graduate School offers master's degree in the field of medicine, public health, nursing, and physical therapy.

== Accreditations and affiliations ==
University of the East is an accredited member of various national and international organizations:

- Philippine Accrediting Association of Schools, Colleges and Universities (PAASCU)
- Philippine Association of Colleges and Universities Commission on Accreditation (PACUCOA)
- Association of Southeast Asian Institutions of Higher Learning (ASAIHL)
- International Association of Universities (IAU)
- Federation of Accrediting Agencies of the Philippines (FAAP)
- Philippine Association of Colleges and Universities (PACU)
- University Belt
- University Athletic Association of the Philippines (UAAP)

== Student organizations ==
- Phi Beta Rho, founded 1962
- UE College of Business Administration - Student Council
- UE Junior Marketing Association
- UE Junior Financial Executives
- Junior Philippine Institute of Accountants - UE Manila
- Management Student Society of University of the East
- UE Institute of Management Accountants
- Beta Epsilon Sigma - Hiyas ng Silangan Honors’ Society
- Tau Alpha Sigma
- Beta Sigma Omicron

== Notable alumni ==
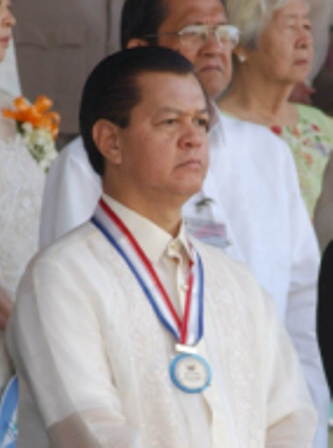
Former Vice President Noli de Castro

The University of the East has produced thousands of graduates from its over 80 years of existence. Prominents are Noli de Castro, former Vice President of the Philippines, former Senator and broadcaster. Other senators are Alfredo Lim and Robert Jaworski.

The university produced Justices from the Supreme Court of the Philippines, Court of Appeals and other legal luminaries, namely Lucas Bersamin, Dante Tinga, Normandie Pizzaro, Japar Dimaampao, Franchito Diamante and Arturo Tayag. UE has produced many government officials, such as members of the Congress of the Philippines, governors and mayors. Legal counsels include Ferdinand Topacio.

In the field of science, Filipino archaeologist and former director of the Anthropology Division of National Museum of the Philippines Alfredo E. Evangelista finished his Bachelor of Arts degree in history from the university.

The University also count artists among its alumni. Poets of the second modernist movement in Filipino poetry include National Artist Virgilio S. Almario, Teo Antonio and Rogelio Mangahas. Recently, they conferred the same honor to Rafael "Nonoy" Froilan (for Dance) and Armando "Bing" Lao (for Film and Broadcast Arts).

Other alumni are businessmen Andrew Tan and Rizalino S. Navarro; broadcasters Peter Musñgi, Quinito Henson, Erwin Tulfo, Ramon Tulfo and Ricky Lo; sportspeople Baby Dalupan, Robert Jaworski, Jerry Codiñera, Allan Caidic, James Yap and Paul Lee.

== Athletics ==
Red and White are UE's school colors.

=== UE Red Warriors ===
The Red Warriors is the champion of the 2013 FilOil Flying V Hanes Premier Cup.

University of the East is one of the member schools of the University Athletic Association of the Philippines. UE hosted the 2006–2007 season with the theme "Achieving Excellence in Sports Through Unity, Harmony and Commitment." The Seniors basketball team is called the UE Red Warriors. The women's teams are called the Amazons, while the Juniors teams are the Pages. The university colors are Red and White.

The university fields varsity teams in the University Athletic Association of the Philippines and has won championships in athletics, basketball, chess, fencing, football, gymnastics, softball and weightlifting tournaments. Some UE student-athletes have also participated in the Southeast Asian Games and other tournaments.

The UE Red Warriors were crowned as the champions of the fourth (2006) Collegiate Champions League (CCL). Another Warriors' accomplishment was capturing the HAIL Championship again. The UE Red Warriors ruled the 2007 Home and Away Invitational League (HAIL) basketball tournament, capturing their third straight championship in three years.

The men's basketball team is currently tied with the UST Growling Tigers as the second winningest team in UAAP history, with 18 titles, most of them coming from the time of Robert Jaworski and Devrick Atok, who's famous for his signature move "the Hawkshot". The Red Warriors hold the longest senior basketball championship run with seven straight UAAP titles. They also hold the longest finals appearance streak, with sixteen straight from 1957 to 1972.

=== UAAP Season 70 Basketball Tournament ===
The Red Warriors completed a rare 14 – 0 sweep of the elimination rounds, with winning margins above 16 points.

Aside from surpassing the 9 – 0 start of the 1986 UE squad bannered by Jerry Codiñera, the Warriors clinched an automatic finals berth and matching the 14 – 0 record accomplished 14 years ago by the UST Growling Tigers, which automatically claimed them the 1993 title.

The Red Warriors however lost to the De La Salle Green Archers, which swept the Warriors in their best-of-three Finals series in a score of 73–64 victory on Game 2, October 7, 2007, at the Big Dome.

=== UAAP Season 72 Basketball Tournament ===
Lawrence Chongson, the Coach of the Cobra Energy Drink team in the Philippine Basketball League (PBL)

The University of the East (UE) Red Warriors moved up to the UAAP Season 72 Finals after defeating the Far Eastern University (FEU) Tamaraws in their semi finals match-up. The Warriors lost the crucial last game of the best-of-three finals with the Ateneo de Manila University Blue Eagles. They thus lost their shot at the Season 72 UAAP crown. First year head coach, Lawrence Chongson lauded his boys for their efforts, especially for their will for not giving up.

=== UAAP Season 77 ===
In 2014, UAAP Season 77 was held and hosted by University of the East with Ms. Carmelita Mateo as president. Eight universities competed in fifteen sports to earn points for the general championship. Some of these sports were aired live or on a delayed telecast by ABS-CBN Sports+Action and ABS-CBN Channel 2. All the men's basketball games and the women's volleyball games were aired live by ABS-CBN Sports.

=== Filoil Flying V Preseason Hanes Cup 2013 ===
The UE Red Warriors won the 2013 Filoil Flying V Preseason Hanes Cup title after defeating the NU Bulldogs 81–68 at the Arena in San Juan.
