= Tic-tac-toe (play) =

One-act comedic play by Peter Solis Nery

Tic-tac-toe is a comedy by multi-awarded Filipino poet and playwright Peter Solis Nery, who won first prize at the 2016 Palanca Awards for this one-act play. It is the most frequently produced - and touted as the funniest - English-language play in Iloilo City in the new millennium.

== Plot summary ==
Tic-tac-toe is about a forward-thinking Ilonggo playwright who produces a "sexually-charged play" for a local theater. As the play goes to rehearsals, it is met with criticism and demands for rewrites: first, from the director; then, from the producer; and finally, from the very conservative consultant and test audience. Albeit unhappy about changing a word in his play, the playwright goes through the motion of revising the play to "satisfy" the demands of the "theatre gods" — with hilarious and hysterical results. Although the playwright passionately argues for modernism in the theater in the course of the play, this play within a play ends with a literal "tic-tac-toe."

== Performances ==
Iloilo Prima Galaw, an Ilonggo theater group, has performed Nery's Tic-tac-toe in various productions, staging it at the Pasinaya Arts Festival at the Cultural Center of the Philippines on February 4, 2018; at Nery's shows in Iloilo's Troi Oi Restaurant on January 27 and February 14, 2018; at the CAP Auditorium in Iloilo City on March 12 and 13, 2018; at the 7th Kuris Theatre Festival in Bacolod City on February 19, 2020 and again at the CAP Auditorium in Iloilo City as part of Commedia dell'Arte on February 27 and 28, 2020.

== Publication ==
Tic-tac-toe was published in Funny, Sad, and Dangerous: Three Award-winning Short Plays (KDP: 2019) alongside two other award-winning Nery plays: Gladiolas [sic] and The Wide Ionian Sea.
