= Gladiolas (play) =

Play by Peter Solis Nery

Gladiolas is a play in the Filipino language by Philippine poet and playwright Peter Solis Nery. It was the first prize winner at the 2014 Palanca Awards for Literature.

== Plot summary ==
The play is set in an unnamed coastal town in Iloilo at the home of the Pajadas. Gay newspaper writer Dennis Pajada has invited his bisexual boyfriend Raymond Chua for a quiet weekend together. Raymond brings Dennis some gladiolas, which the play explains to be a "bisexual" flower. Dennis introduces Raymond to his homophobic father, Federico, whom he has cared for since his mother and sisters have emigrated to the United States. In the course of their first evening together, they talk about resentment, guilt, and regrets; family responsibilities, and individual ambition; and the pursuit of personal happiness. Adding complications to the mix are Raymond's unseen wife, and young Dennis's appearance onstage to wrestle Federico. Providing commentaries and text messages are captions projected on a screen. The play ends with gladiolas on the floor, and Federico crawling to touch the nearest flower.

== Publication ==
Gladiolas was published in Funny, Sad, and Dangerous: Three Award-winning Short Plays (KDP: 2019) alongside other award-winning Nery plays, namely: The Wide Ionian Sea, and the comedy Tic-tac-toe.
