= Peter's Prize =

Hiligaynon language literary contest

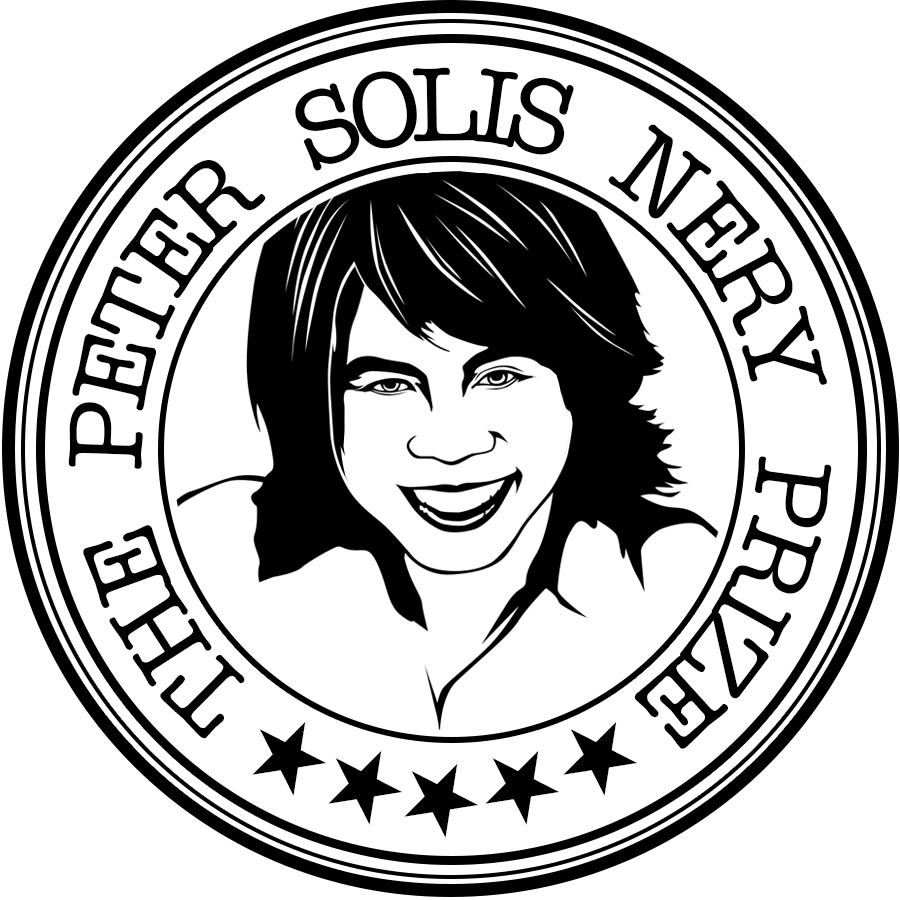

Peter’s Prize or The Peter Solis Nery Prize for Excellence in Hiligaynon Writing is a literary contest in the Hiligaynon language of the Philippines established by The Peter Solis Nery Foundation for Hiligaynon Literature and the Arts, Inc. in 2013 to fulfill its mission to promote, preserve, and propagate Hiligaynon literature. It was expanded to include special prizes for excellence in literary scholarship and cultural work, and additional competitive prizes in the various art forms in its succeeding years. It was named after foremost Hiligaynon (Ilonggo) writer Peter Solis Nery from Dumangas, Iloilo.

== History ==
In September 2012, right after his induction into the Palanca Awards Hall of Fame in the Philippines, Filipino author Peter Solis Nery, who writes in three languages and across various literary genres, established The Peter Solis Nery Foundation for Hiligaynon Literature and the Arts, Inc. with the expressed aim to promote, preserve, and propagate Hiligaynon literature, and Filipino art and culture, through research, publications, productions, education, and cultural dissemination. As a vehicle to fulfill such mission, the foundation created Peter’s Prize to recognize excellent new writings and scholarship in the Hiligaynon language and its literature. The first Peter’s Prize awards were given out in September 2013. In 2014, The Peter Solis Nery Foundation started giving Special Peter's Prize recognition to individuals who have done outstanding scholarship in literary studies, criticism, and translation. The Peter's Prize was also expanded to include such fields as visual arts, theatre arts, and cultural dissemination in 2017.

== Champion of Hiligaynon ==
Peter Solis Nery is a Filipino author, also known as an Hiligaynon or Ilonggo writer because he hails from the province of Iloilo in the Western Visayas region of the Philippines. He writes in three languages: English, Filipino, and his native language, Hiligaynon. He is a poet, fictionist, playwright, screenwriter, memoirist, and newspaper columnist; in addition to being a nurse, filmmaker, performing artist, lecturer, editor-publisher, and philanthropist. Because of his evident love for his mother tongue, his prodigious literary output and publication in the language, and the commitment of his foundation to the development and advancement of Hiligaynon, he is known as the Champion of Hiligaynon (or Champion of the Hiligaynon language) despite his lack of formal studies or degree in linguistics. He masterminded and initiated the Hiligaynon Revolution of 2014 for the globally aware generation on June 12, 2014.,

== Peter’s Prize Medalists ==
A specially crafted medallion is awarded to the grand and first prize winners of the Peter’s Prize competitions, and to select individuals who have contributed to the development and growth of the Hiligaynon language and literature, and to the continued success of the foundation. Peter’s Prizes have been awarded to:

- Jesus C. Insilada – 2013 Mga Binalaybay sang Paghigugma (Love Poems)
- Early Sol Gadong – 2013 Labing Malip-ut nga Sugilanon (Very, Very Short Story)
- Early Sol Gadong – 2014 Mga Sugilanon Pangbata (Stories for Children)
- Michael de la Peña – 2014 Ang Pinakamasubo nga Sugilanon sang Paghigugma nga Nasaysay (The Saddest Love Story Ever Told)
- Felino S. Garcia, Jr. – 2014 Special Prize for Excellence in Literary Criticism
- Michael de la Peña - 2015 Mga Binalaybay Tuhoy sa Tubi (Poems about Water)
- Michael de la Peña - 2015 Makangilidlis nga Sugilanon (Horror Story)
- Lydia Porquido - 2015 Special Prize for Excellence in Literary Translation
- Dolly Ann Reyes - 2015 Special Prize for Excellence in Literary Translation
- Marco Antonio Limson - 2016 Labing Malip-ut nga Sugilanon Pangbata (Flash Fiction for Children)
- Nilyn Gamuza-Pacariem - 2016 Labing Malip-ut nga Sugilanon Panghamtong (Flash Fiction for Adults)
- Ma. Cecilia Locsin-Nava - 2016 Special Prize for Excellence in Literary Studies
- Edward Marcito - 2017 Mga Binalaybay nga Gintugda sang Sugilanon (Poetry Inspired by a Story)
- John Michael D. Catigan - 2017 Visual Arts (Painting)
- Melecio F. Turao - 2017 Special Prize for Excellence in Literary Studies
- Ismael E. Java - 2017 Special Prize for Excellence in Theatre Arts
- Chona Villaluna Gosiaoco - 2017 Special Prize for Excellence in Cultural Dissemination
- Serafin I. Plotria, Jr. - 2018 Mga Binalaybay Sabat sa Panghangkat (Poem-a-thon)
- Kristoffer George Brasileño - 2018 Special Prize for Excellence in Visual Arts (Digital Illustration)
- Janeth Deza Demegillo - 2018 Special Prize for Excellence in Cultural Dissemination
- Ferlie Joy M. Lanaria - 2019 Mga Binalaybay sang Paghigugma (Love Poems)
- Richard D. Olano, Jr. - 2019 Film (Three-minute Silent)
- Alex C. delos Santos - 2019 Special Prize for Excellence in Literary Studies
- Adonis C. Gonzales - 2020 Malip-ut nga Sugilanon (Short Story)
- Celia F. Parcon - 2020 Special Prize for Excellence in Literary Translation
- Jonell Segador Gregorio - 2021 Covid Literature
- Edward Marcito - 2021 Labing Malip-ut nga Sugilanon Pangbata (Flash Fiction for Children)
- Francis Ryan Basa Pabiania - 2021 Film (Three-minute Silent)
- Romie John Dimzon Delariarte - 2021 Special Prize for Excellence in Theatre Arts
- Reyniel O. Tomas - 2022 Poetry by 21 & Under
- Paul Aries Valera - 2022 Essay
- Ritchie D. Pagunsan - 2022 Special Prize for Excellence in Cultural Dissemination
- Jose Anthony Gerard V. Muyco - 2023 Pandemic Literature
- Niel L. Ibañez - 2023 Mga Binalaybay sang Paghigugma (Love Poetry)
- Marcelo A. Tolentino IV - 2023 Film (Three-minute Silent)
- Ivan Jetrho L. Mella - 2023 Playwriting (One-act Play)
- Christian George F. Acevedo - 2024 Adapted Story
- Christine Godinez Ortega - 2024 Special Prize for Excellence in Cultural Dissemination
- Norhan B. Kudarat - 2025 Humorous Story
- Emersan D. Baldemor - 2025 Love Poetry
- John Rovic T. Lopez - 2025 Film (Three-minute Silent)
