= 2011 Palanca Awards =

Philippine literary award

61st Palanca Awards
- Date: September 1, 2011
- Location: The Peninsula Manila, Makati, Philippines

The 61st Don Carlos Palanca Memorial Awards for Literature was held on September 1, 2011, at The Peninsula Manila in Makati to commemorate the memory of Don Carlos Palanca Sr. through an endeavor that would promote education and culture in the country. National Artist for Literature Francisco Sionil Jose was Guest of Honor and Speaker at this year’s awarding ceremony.

== English Division ==
=== Novel ===
- Grand Prize: Marivi Soliven-Blanco, In the Service of Secrets

=== Short Story ===
- First Prize: Asterio Enrico N. Gutierrez, "The Big Man"
- Second Prize: Alexis Abola, "Disappearances"
- Third Prize: Johannes L. Chua, "Prodigal"

=== Short Story for Children ===
- First Prize: Nikki Alfar, "Tom Yum"
- Second Prize: Georgianna R. De Vera, "Tatay, Through the Wind and the Waves"
- Third Prize: Benjamin Pimentel, "Gagamba, The Spider from the Islands"

=== Poetry ===
- First Prize: Eliza A. Victoria, "Maps"
- Second Prize: Marie S. La Viña, "Stones and Other Poems"
- Third Prize: Simeon Dumdum Jr., "Maguindanao"

=== Poetry Written for Children ===
- First Prize: Cynthia Baculi-Condez, "The Universe and Other Poems"
- Second Prize: Peter Solis Nery, "The Shape of Happiness"
- Third Prize: Kris Lanot Lacaba, "The Shaggy Brown Chicken and Other Poems for Children (and for Chicken of All Ages)"

=== Essay ===
- First Prize: Jenny Ortuoste, "The Turn for Home: Memories of Santa Ana Park"
- Second Prize: Jeena Rani Marquez-Manaois, "The River of Gold"
- Third Prize: Rosario Cruz Lucero, "The Stain of Blackberries"

=== One-Act Play ===
- First Prize: Floy Quintos, "Evening at the Opera"
- Second Prize: No Winner
- Third Prize: No Winner

=== Full-Length Play ===
- First Prize: Joshua L. Lim So, "A Return Home"
- Second Prize: Peter Solis Nery, "If the Shoe Fits (Or, The Five Men Imelda Marcos Meets in Heaven)"
- Third Prize: Jonathan R. Guillermo, "Freshmen"

== Filipino Division ==
=== Nobela ===
- Grand Prize: Allan Alberto N. Derain, Ang Banal na Aklat ng Mga Kumag

=== Maikling Kwento ===
- First Prize: No Winner
- Second Prize: No Winner
- Third Prize: Michael S. Bernaldez, "Metro Gwapo"

=== Maikling Kwentong Pambata ===
- First Prize: Segundo D. Matias Jr., "Alamat ng Duhat"
- Second Prize: Joachim Emilio B. Antonio, "Sa Tapat ng Tindahan ni Mang Teban"
- Third Prize: Christian U. Tordecillas, "Si Inda, Ang Manok at Ang Mga Lamang-lupa"

=== Tula ===
- First Prize: Enrique S. Villasis, "Agua"
- Second Prize: Joseph Rosmon M. Tuazon, "Mga Nakaw na Linya"
- Third Prize: Christopher B. Nuyles, "Ilang Tala Hinggil sa Daangbakal"

=== Tulang Pambata ===
- First Prize: Marcel L. Milliam, "Ako ang Bida"
- Second Prize: Eugene Evasco, "Isang Mabalahibong Bugtong"
- Third Prize: John Enrico C. Torralba, "Manghuhuli Ako ng Sinag ng Araw"

=== Sanaysay ===
- First Prize: Bernadette V. Neri, "Ang Pag-uwi ng Alibughang Anak ng Lupa"
- Second Prize: Rosario Torres-Yu, "Nagbibihis na ang Nanay"
- Third Prize: Nancy Kimuell-Gabriel, "Kubeta"

=== Dulang May Isang Yugto ===
- First Prize: Remi Karen M. Velasco, "Ondoy: Ang Buhay sa Bubong"
- Second Prize: Layeta P. Bucoy, "El Galeon de Simeon"
- Third Prize: Bernardo O. Aguay Jr., "Posporo"

=== Dulang May Ganap na Haba ===
- First Prize: Rodolfo C. Vera, "Paalam, Señor Soledad"
- Second Prize: Liza C. Magtoto, "Tamala"
- Third Prize: Joshua L. Lim So, "Panahon ng Sampung Libong Ilong"

=== Dulang Pampelikula ===
- First Prize: Lemuel E. Garcellano, "Tru Lab"
- Second Prize: T-Jay K. Medina, "Huling Isang Taon"
- Third prize: Helen V. Lasquite, "Emmanuel"

== Regional Division ==
=== Short Story [Cebuano] ===
- First Prize: Richel G. Dorotan, "Ang Tawo sa Punoan sa Nangka sa Hinablayan"
- Second Prize: Errol A, Merquita, "Isla Verde"
- Third Prize: Macario D. Tiu, "Black Pearl"

=== Short Story [Hiligaynon] ===
- First Prize: Peter Solis Nery, "Donato Bugtot"
- Second Prize: Alice Tan-Gonzales, "Kahapunanon sa Laguerta ni Alberto"
- Third Prize: Kizza Grace F. Gardoce, "Pabalon"

=== Short Story [Iluko] ===
- First Prize: Ariel Sotelo Tabag, "Saddam"
- Second Prize: Juan A. Asuncion, "Ayuno"
- Third Prize: Norberto D. Bumanglang Jr., "Ti Agdamdamili"

== Kabataan Division ==
=== Kabataan Essay ===
- First Prize: Mariah Christelle F. Reodica, "The Golden Mean"
- Second Prize: Scott Lee Chua, "Of Pixels and Power"
- Third Prize: Leo Francis F. Abot, "Gods of the Internet"

=== Kabataan Sanaysay ===
- First Prize: Mary Amie Gelina E. Dumatol, "Ang Makulit, Ang Mapagtanong, at Ang Mundo ng Kasagutan"
- Second Prize: Abegail Joy Yuson Lee, "Nang Maging Mendiola Ko ang Internet Dahil Kay Mama"
- Third Prize: Maria Bettina Clare N. Camacho, "Isang Pindot sa Kamalayan"
