= 2022 Palanca Awards =

Writing award

70th Palanca Awards
- Date: November 30, 2022
- Location: Marquis Events Place, Bonifacio Global City, Taguig, Philippines

The 70th Don Carlos Palanca Memorial Awards for Literature was held on November 30, 2022, at the Marquis Events Place in Bonifacio Global City in Taguig to commemorate the memory of Carlos Palanca through an endeavor that would promote education and culture in the country. The traditional ceremony was held after a two-year hiatus due to the COVID-19 pandemic. A total of 59 writers, 28 of whom were first-time awardees, were chosen as this year's recipients. The total number of writing categories awarded was 22, with the categories for the Novel and the Nobela open this year, with the surprise addition of a Special Prize for each. Nicanor Tiongson was Guest of Honor and Speaker at this year's awarding ceremony.

The 2022 winners are divided into four categories:

== English Division ==
=== Novel ===
- Grand Prize: Raymundo T. Pandan, Jr., Bittersweetland
- Special Prize: Alvin Dela Serna Lopez, 1762

=== Short Story ===
- First Prize: Ian Rosales Casocot, "Ceferina in Apartment 2G"
- Second Prize: Alexis Abola, "Ardor"
- Third Prize: Hammed Bolotaolo, "The Money Changer"

=== Short Story for Children ===
- First Prize: No Winner
- Second Prize: Elyrah L. Salanga-Torralba, "Cloud Keeper"
- Third Prize: Heather Ann Ferrer Pulido, "My Grandma Who Lives in Half a House"

=== Essay ===
- First Prize: Alfonso Tomas P. Araullo, "Letter from Tawi-Tawi"
- Second Prize: Michaela Sarah De Leon, "Filipino Millennial Monomyth"
- Third Prize: Alexandra Francesca A. Bichara, "The Helmsman's Daughter"

=== Poetry ===
- First Prize: Ramil Digal Gulle, "Bol-anon Prodigal"
- Second Prize: Soleil David, "A Few Dawns from Now, A Sunfish"
- Third Prize: Lawrence Anthony R. Bernabe, "The Blueline"

=== Poetry Written for Children ===
- First Prize: Elyrah L. Salanga-Torralba, "An Empty Chair in the Corner"
- Second Prize: Peter Solis Nery, "Picnic, Symphony and Other Concepts a 4th Grader Needs to Know"
- Third Prize: No Winner

=== One-Act Play ===
- First Prize: Ronald S. Covar, "The Cave Dwellers"
- Second Prize: Bonifacio P. Ilagan, "Salvaged Eman"
- Third Prize: Maria Kristine B. Roxas-Miller, "Agencia Feliz"

=== Full-Length play ===
- First Prize: Layeta P. Bucoy, "Orgullo Compound"
- Second Prize: Jay Mariano Crisostomo IV, "Black Bordello"
- Third Prize: Dustin Edward D. Celestino, "The Lost Filipino Patriots of America"

== Filipino Division ==
=== Nobela ===
- Grand Prize: Khavn, ANTIMARCOS
- Special Prize: Edgar Calabia Samar, Teorya ng Unang Panahon

=== Maikling Kwento ===
- First Prize: Charmaine M. Lasar, "Ang Value ng X Kapag Choppy si Mam"
- Second Prize: Abegail E. Pariente, "Barangay Alitaptap"
- Third Prize: Alec Joshua B. Paradeza, "Kung sa Bawat Pagtawag ay Pagtawid sa Dagat"

=== Maikling Kwentong Pambata ===
- First Prize: Mark Norman S. Boquiren, "Si VeRaptor1 Laban kay Trolakuz"
- Second Prize: Wilfredo Farrales Sarangaya, "Balong Batsit, ang Bidang Bulilit at Bayaning Bulinggit"
- Third Prize: Benedick N. Damaso, "Mirasol para kay Lola Sol"

=== Sanaysay ===
- First Prize: Venice Kayla Dacanay Delica, "Kung Magkapalad Ka't Mangmang"
- Second Prize: Jhon Lester P. Sandigan, "Tatlong Pancit Canton"
- Third Prize: Nathaniel R. Alcantara, "Isang Dekadang Kontrata sa Piling ng mga Mikrobyo"

=== Tula ===
- First Prize: Ralph Lorenz G. Fonte, "Uyayi ng mga Patay na Buwan"
- Second Prize: Enrique S. Villasis, "Pintula"
- Third Prize: Sonny C. Sendon, "Mga Anino sa Guho at Iba Pang Mga Tula"

=== Tulang Pambata ===
- First Prize: Christian R. Vallez, "Tula, Tula, Paano ka Ginawa?"
- Second Prize: Rebecca T. Anonuevo, "Ale Bangbang"
- Third Prize: Ninia H. dela Cruz, "Mga Pahina sa Alaala ng Nanay"

=== Dulang May Isang Yugto ===
- First Prize: Andrew Bonifacio L. Clete, "Punks Not Dead"
- Second Prize: Layeta P. Bucoy, "Dance of the Foolies"
- Third Prize: Ryan Machado, "Huling Haraya nina Ischia at Emeteria"

=== Dulang Ganap ang Haba ===
- First Prize: Joshua Lim So, "Mga Silid ng Unos: Tomo Uno"
- Second Prize: Rodolfo C. Vera, "Anak Datu"
- Third Prize: Steven Prince C. Fernandez, "Badung"

=== Dulang Pampelikula ===
- First Prize: Avelino Mark C. Balmes, Jr., "Amoy Pulbos"
- Second Prize: Noreen Besmar Capili, "DOS"
- Third Prize: Ehdison M. Dimen, "Ang Pananalangin sa Getsemani"

== Regional Division ==
=== Short Story [Cebuano] ===
- First Prize: Noel P. Tuazon, "Barang"
- Second Prize: Manu Avenido, "Ikigai"
- Third prize: Januar E. Yap, "John Wayne ug ang Goldfish kong Inahan"

=== Short Story [Hiligaynon] ===
- First Prize: Peter Solis Nery, "Ang Macatol Kag Ang Queen of Relief"
- Second Prize: Early Sol A. Gadong, "Malipayon nga Katapusan"
- Third Prize: Ritchie D. Pagunsan, "Esperanza"

=== Short Story [Iluko] ===
- First Prize: Oswald Ancheta Valente, "Ti Kimat Ken Ti Silag"
- Second Prize: Remedios S. Tabelisma-Aguillon, "Ti Ubing"
- Third Prize: Rodolfo D. Agatep Jr., "Karton"

== Kabataan Division ==
=== Kabataan Essay ===
- First Prize: Glorious Zahara Exylin C. Alesna, "Home is a Bowl of Warm Soup"
- Second Prize: Jenine A. Santos, "Covid-19 is My Alter Ego"
- Third Prize: Gavin Micah T. Herrera, "The Social Pandemic"

=== Kabataan Sanaysay ===
- First Prize: Glorious Zavannah Exylin C. Alesna, "Pamimintana"
- Second Prize: Hansly Kendrich C. Saw, "Ang Larong Naipanalo Ko"
- Third Prize: John Clarence D. Espedido, "Mga Bantas ang Nagsilbi kong Guro"
