= 2024 Palanca Awards =

Writing award

72nd Palanca Memorial Awards
- Date: November 22, 2024
- Location: Philippine International Convention Center, Pasay, Philippines

The 72nd Carlos Palanca Memorial Awards for Literature was held on November 22, 2024, at the Philippine International Convention Center in Pasay to commemorate the memory of Carlos Palanca through an endeavor that would promote education and culture in the country.

A total of 54 writers, 31 of whom were first-time awardees, were chosen as this year's recipients. The total number of writing categories awarded was 22. Film director and writer Jun Robles Lana, recipient of the Palanca Awards Hall of Fame in 2006, was Guest of Honor and Speaker at this year's awarding ceremony.

Four writers were elevated to the Hall of Fame, including Eros Sanchez Atalia, who clinched his fifth first prize for the novel "Thirty Virgins"; Mikael de Lara Co, for his poetry collection "Panayam sa Abo"; Miguel Antonio Alfredo V. Luarca, for his full-length play "Corridors"; and Joshua Lim So, for his one-act play "Pagkapit sa Hangin." The said award is given to writers who have won five (5) first places in any category.

The 2024 winners are divided into four categories:

== English Division ==
=== Novel ===
- Grand Prize: Lakan Umali, "The Ferdinand Project"
- Special Prize: Michael Aaron Gomez, "The People's Republic of Negros"

=== Short Story ===
- First Prize: Jan Kevin M. Rivera, "Muted City"
- Second Prize: Antonio Hernandez, "The Man Who Sold Dignity"
- Third Prize: Kiefer Adrian Z. Occeño, "Bee Happy"

=== Short Story for Children ===
- First Prize: No Winner
- Second Prize: No Winner
- Third Prize: Edgar Calabia Samar, "A Young Poet Dreams of a Hundred Words That Rhyme with Manila"

=== Essay ===
- First Prize: Lioba Asia E. Piluden, "Ghost-Hunting in Sagada"
- Second Prize: Kara Danielle Eraña Medina, "Another Hope Entirely"
- Third Prize: Jade Mark Capiñares, "A Personal History of Sea Urchins"

=== Poetry ===
- First Prize: Joel M. Toledo, "Silangan"
- Second Prize: Lyde Sison Villanueva, "La Muerte de la Luz"
- Third Prize: Mookie Katigbak-Lacuesta, "We Are Not Yet Lost"

=== Poetry Written for Children ===
- First Prize: Edgar Calabia Samar, "Every Year, J Gained a Power"
- Second Prize: Stacy Haynie Bolislis Ayson, "Where are the Dinosaurs?"
- Third Prize: Peter Solis Nery, "Thirteen Ways of Looking at Books"

=== One-Act Play ===
- First Prize: Eljay Castro Deldoc, "Unidentified"
- Second Prize: Miguel Antonio Alfredo V. Luarca, "The Impossible Dream"
- Third Prize: Kenneth Theodore Cheng Keng, "Line Up"

=== Full-Length play ===
- First Prize: Miguel Antonio Alfredo V. Luarca, "Corridors"
- Second Prize: Dustin Edward Celestino, "Birdie"
- Third Prize: Emilio Antonio Babao Guballa, "The Echoist"

== Filipino Division ==
=== Nobela ===
- Grand Prize: Eros Sanchez Atalia, "Thirty Virgins"
- Special Prize: No Winner

=== Maikling Kwento ===
- First Prize: Mark Anthony Angeles, "Gagambang-Bahay"
- Second Prize: Hannah A. Leceña, "Siya si Ril"
- Third Prize: Aljane C. Baterna, "Ang Lungga"

=== Maikling Kwentong Pambata ===
- First Prize: Christopher S. Rosales, "Musikong Bumbong"
- Second Prize: Brian James S. Camaya, "Si Bambalito, Ang Batang Bayani ng Bangkusay"
- Third Prize: John Patrick F. Solano, "Atang Para Kay Nanang Toyang"

=== Sanaysay ===
- First Prize: Tomas F. Agulto, "Tulambuhay ng Isang Makatang Laway"
- Second Prize: David R. Corpuz, "Autoetnograpiya ng Luksa"
- Third Prize: Adelle Liezl Chua, "Love Child"

=== Tula ===
- First Prize: Mikael de Lara Co, "Panayam sa Abo"
- Second Prize: John Dave B. Pacheco, "Paa, Tuhod, Balikat ng Tagakaulo: Higatang sa Pangil ng Pana-panahong Pagkalugmok"
- Third Prize: John Brixter M. Tino, "Dugo ng Aking Dugo"

=== Tulang Pambata ===
- First Prize: John Romeo Leongson Venturero, "Anak ng Baha! Mga Tulang Pambata"
- Second Prize: John Michael G. Londres, "Saklolo, Trak ng Bumbero!"
- Third Prize: Eros Sanchez Atalia, "Add to Cart at Iba Pang mga Tula"

=== Dulang May Isang Yugto ===
- First Prize: Joshua Lim So, "Pagkapit sa Hangin"
- Second Prize: Hans Pieter Luyun Arao, "Vengeance of the Gods"
- Third Prize: U Z. Eliserio, "Ang Trahedya ni Bert"

=== Dulang Ganap ang Haba ===
- First Prize: No Winner
- Second Prize: Miguel Antonio Alfredo V. Luarca, "Ardor"
- Third Prize: Andrew Aquino Estacio, "Ka Amado"

=== Dulang Pampelikula ===
- First Prize: Andrew Bonifacio L. Clete, "Championship"
- Second Prize: Raymund T. Barcelon, "Paglilitis"
- Third Prize: Rian Jay Hernandez, "Dobol"

== Regional Division ==
=== Short Story [Cebuano] ===
- First Prize: Michael Aaron Gomez, "Pamalandong ni Antigo Mokayat"
- Second Prize: Reynaldo A. Caturza, "Anino"
- Third prize: Gracelda I. Lina, "Maninibya"

=== Short Story [Hiligaynon] ===
- First Prize: Serafin I. Plotria Jr., "Ang Liwat nga Paglupad ni Lolo"
- Second Prize: Bryan Mari Argos, "Labo"
- Third Prize: Al Jeffrey L. Gonzales, "Anagas, Anagas, Baylo 'Ta Ngalan"

=== Short Story [Iluko] ===
- First Prize: Neyo E. Valdez, "Panaggawid"
- Second Prize: Ma. Lourdes Ladi Opinaldo, "Uram"
- Third Prize: Prodie Gar. Padios, "Anniniwan"

== Kabataan Division ==
=== Kabataan Essay ===
- First Prize: Brant Angelo S. Ambes, "The Digital Snowball"
- Second Prize: Ruth Mecanelle Magolhado, "My Humanly Unhuman Friend"
- Third Prize: Glorious Zahara Exylin Alesna, "Some Things Must Never Change"

=== Kabataan Sanaysay ===
- First Prize: Glorious Zahara Exylin Alesna, "Dito sa Kanlungan ng Hiraya't Katotohanan"
- Second Prize: Raya T. Mitra, "Sinulid at Buhay"
- Third Prize: Lancelot MJ T. Edillor, "Bura, Sulat"
