= Cabalum =

Cabalum is a family name from Leon, Iloilo. It may refer to:

- Jose Cabalum Sr. (1915–2006), a Filipino educator

== See also ==
- Cabal, a group of people united in some design, often secretively.
