= Lirio (story) =

Short story by Peter Solis Nery

Lirio is a short story by Peter Solis Nery, written originally in the Hiligaynon language of the Philippines, and in the magical realism style. It won first prize in the Hiligaynon Short Story category of the 1998 Palanca Awards for Literature The story is also widely used in the teaching of regional literature of the Philippines.

== Plot summary ==
The short story narrates the life of Lirio the Mute from her difficult birth to her magical transformation into a flower. Born to Rosa and Manuel, a couple who were granted a child only in their old age, Lirio was also strange in addition to being mute. She was fair-skinned “like a white lily” and was always followed by a swarm of butterflies. She was unschooled and only enjoyed gardening as her hobby. She fell in love with Noli, but he also left for a job in Japan. Soon after, she married Itik, a police sergeant who was also a jealous and terrible drunk who continually raped her throughout their marriage until one night when, pushed to her limit, Lirio fervently prayed to be turned into a lily.

== Publication ==
Lirio has been published in Fantasia: The Palanca Award-winning Stories of Peter Solis Nery (DreamWings Publishing: 2000), and Stories in a Mellifluous Language: Hiligaynon Short Stories (CreateSpace: 2012). It was translated into English by Celia F. Parcon, and in the Filipino language by the author himself, among other translators. The English translation appears in the book Nothing’s Lost (KDP: 2020). It is also included in the first and second editions of the DIWA Senior High School Series: Creative Writing textbook (DIWA Learning Systems, Inc.: 2017, and 2019).
