= 2019 Palanca Awards =

Writing award

69th Palanca Awards
- Date: November 8, 2019
- Location: The Peninsula Manila, Makati, Philippines

The 69th Don Carlos Palanca Memorial Awards for Literature was held on November 8, 2019, at the The Peninsula Manila in Makati to commemorate the memory of Carlos Palanca through an endeavor that would promote education and culture in the country. Fifty-six writers, 32 of whom won the award for the first time, received the prestigious literary award. There were a total of 22 writing categories, with the bi-annual Novel and Novela categories open for this year. Cristina Pantoja-Hidalgo was Guest of Honor and Speaker at this year’s awarding ceremony.

Lamberto E. Antonio was this year's Palanca Hall of Fame awardee. He clinched his fifth first prize for “Turno Kung Nokturno at Iba pang Tiyempo ng Rilyebo sa Pagberso” under the Tula category. The said award is given to writers who have won five (5) first places in any category.

Also, the ceremonies saw the posthumous awarding of Milagros Palanca-Furer, the proponent of the Carlos Palanca Memorial Awards for Literature. She was instrumental in helping spur creative writing in the country and is being rightfully recognized for her unwavering dedication to the interest of the Filipino writer.

LIST OF WINNERS

The 2019 winners are divided into four categories:

== English Division ==
=== Novel ===
- Grand Prize: Reine Arcache Melvin, The Betrayed

=== Short Story ===
- First Prize: Kathleen Osias, "The James Machine"
- Second Prize: Rayjinar Anne Marie de Guia Salcedo, "Death for Serafina"
- Third Prize: Adrian Carl M. Pescador, "Neon Blindness"

=== Short Story for Children ===
- First Prize: Juanita Roxas Singer, "Pretty Peach and The Color-Matching Kaleidoscope"
- Second Prize: Victoria Estrella C. Bravo, "Hair"
- Third Prize: Daisy Ruth Oñate Sohne, "The Accidental Adventure of Bubalus Bubalis"

=== Essay ===
- First Prize: Jocelyn G. Nicolas, "The Age of the Missing"
- Second Prize: Josephine V. Roque, "Ashfall"
- Third Prize: Michaela Sarah De Leon, "Call Me A Book 'Editor,' I Dare You"

=== Poetry ===
- First Prize: Regine Miren D. Cabato, "Notes from the Field"
- Second Prize: Rodrigo V. Dela Peña Jr., "Pentimento"
- Third Prize: Alvin Dela Serna Lopez, "Departures"

=== Poetry Written for Children ===
- First Prize: No Winner
- Second Prize: No Winner
- Third Prize: Mia A. Buenaventura, "What Magical Fur is This? And Other Poems"

=== One-Act Play ===
- First Prize: Peter Zaragoza Mayshle, "Dolorosa"
- Second Prize: Adrian Carl M. Pescador, "Daddy Complex"
- Third Prize: Maria Amparo Nolasco Warren, "The Root of all Magic"

=== Full-Length Play ===
- First Prize: Justin Michael A. Naniong, "Changelings"
- Second Prize: Rolando S. Salvaña, "Mercy Country"
- Third Prize: Lito Casaje, "Theoria Republica"

== Filipino Division ==
=== Nobela ===
- Grand Prize: Jerking Guzman Pingol, Agaw-anino

=== Maikling Kwento ===
- First Prize: Eros S. Atalia, "Si Etot"
- Second Prize: Benjamin Joshua L. Gutierrez, "Dahil Wala Kaming Tubig"
- Third Prize: Allan Alberto N. Derain, "Hilaw at Luto sa Bangkete ni Kapitan Gimo"

=== Maikling Kwentong Pambata ===
- First Prize: Luis P. Gatmaitan, "Maselan ang Tanong ng Batang si Usman"
- Second Prize: Victoria Estrella C. Bravo, "Ako ang Kuya"
- Third Prize: Jacqueline V. Franquelli, "Anak ng Tinapay"

=== Sanaysay ===
- First Prize: Marianne Mixkaela Z. Villalon, "Form & Content: Sandata sa Panahon ng Disimpormasyon at War on Drugs"
- Second Prize: Wilfredo O. Pascual Jr., "Sumasaiyo"
- Third Prize: Reson A. Gregorio, "Wala sa Langit si Hesus"

=== Tula ===
- First Prize: Marianne Mixkaela Z. Villalon, "Turno Kung Nokturno at iba pang Tiyempo ng Rilyebo sa Pagberso"
- Second Prize: Ralph Fonte, "Ang Wika ng Dagat ay Layo"
- Third Prize: Allan John Andres, "Yaong Hindi Maaaring Hawakan nang Buo"

=== Tula Para sa mga Bata ===
- First Prize: No Winner
- Second Prize: John Romeo L. Venturero, "Ganito sa Pabrika"
- Third Prize: German Villanueva Gervacio, "Ang Totoo Raya, ang Ulan ay Luha ng Bituin"

=== Dulang may Isang Yugto ===
- First Prize: No Winner
- Second Prize: Chona M. Fernando, "Beach House"
- Third Prize: Bridgette Ann M. Rebuca, "Transient Lovers"

=== Dulang Ganap ang Haba ===
- First Prize: Dustin Edward D. Celestino, Ang Duyan ng Magiting"
- Second Prize: Mario L. Mendez, Jr., "Ang Huling Mambabatok"
- Third Prize: Bonifacio P. Ilagan, "Junix at Maricel"

=== Dulang Pampelikula ===
- First Prize: Mary Honeylyn Joy E. Alipio, "Teatro Pacifico"
- Second Prize: Jaymar Santos Castro, "Angkas"
- Third Prize: Rodolfo C. Vera, "Nana Rosa"

== Regional Division ==
=== Short Story [Cebuano] ===
- First Prize: Roehl Joseph A. Dazo, "Binignit"
- Second Prize: Januar E. Yap, "Ang Haya ni Tasyo"
- Third Prize: Jondy M. Arpilleda, "Armas"

=== Short Story [Hiligaynon] ===
- First Prize: Alice Tan Gonzales, "Si Ena sa Kasisidmon"
- Second Prize: Ritchie D. Pagunsan, "Pakutkot"
- Third Prize: Anthony B. Capirayan, "Ang mga Retrato sang Dalaga"

=== Short Story [Ilokano] ===
- First Prize: Edison B. Tobias, "El Quinto"
- Second Prize: Daniel L. Nesperos, "Ti Kayo"
- Third Prize: Remedios S. Tabelisma-Aguillon, "Naisangsangayan a Sangaili"

== Kabataan Division ==
=== Kabataan Essay ===
- First Prize: Enrico Miguel Pe Aguirre Perez, "Thoughts on Eden"
- Second Prize: Criscela Ysabelle A. Racelis, "Before You Click"
- Third Prize: Ann Jeline R. Pablo, "The Naught of What-is, What-ifs, and Whats-not"

=== Kabataan Sanaysay ===
- First Prize: Marielle M. Calicdan, "Echo Mula Sa Gatilyo"
- Second Prize: Mark Andy Pedere, "Sa Pilang Salungat sa Manghuhula at Bolang Kristal"
- Third Prize: Adrian Pete Medina Pregonir, "Noon Akto-o He’n Fa Gali Em (May Katotohanan pa Pala)"
