= Dominador =

Dominador is a male given name. Notable people with the name include:

- Carmelo Dominador Flores Morelos (1930–2016), Filipino Roman Catholic archbishop
- Dominador Aytona (1918–2017), Filipino politician and lawyer
- Dominador Baldomero Bazán (1937–2006), former Vice President of Panama
- Dominador Calumarde (born 1946), Filipino boxer
- Dominador Gómez (1866–1930), Filipino ilustrado nationalist, physician, legislator, and a labor leader
- Dominador Ilio (1913–2006), Filipino poet and professor
- Dominador I. Mangubat (1903–1980), Filipino medical doctor and statesman
- Dominador Santos, Filipino brewmaster and chemist

== See also ==
- Cerro Dominador Solar Thermal Plant, a 210-megawatt combined concentrated solar power and photovoltaic plant in the commune of María Elena, Chile
