= P.D. Monfort National Science High School =

Public high school in Iloilo, Philippines

Location
- Dumangas, Iloilo; Philippines; 10°51′31″N 122°43′05″E

Information
- Principal: Violete L. Libo-on, Ph.D.

P.D. Monfort National Science High School (Filipino: Pambansang Mataas na Paaralang Pang-Agham ng P.D. Monfort) is a public science high school in the Philippines, recognized by the Department of Education. It is located in Dumangas, Iloilo and had an enrollment of 758 students in 2004. It is one of two science high schools in Iloilo, the other being Jose Monfort National Science High School in Barotac Nuevo.

The principal of the school is Violete L. Libo-on, Ph.D.
