= Reynaldo A. Duque =

Filipino writer (1945–2013)

- Born: 29 October 1945; Bagani Ubbog, Candon, Ilocos Sur, Commonwealth of the Philippines
- Died: 8 April 2013 (aged 67)
- Other names: RAD, Rey
- Occupations: Novelist, poet, fiction writer. journalist
- Known for: Angkel Sam, Centerly, Manong!

Reynaldo A. Duque (29 October 1945 – 8 April 2013) was a multilingual Ilocano writer (he wrote in Ilocano, Filipino, and English) who was the editor-in-chief of Liwayway magazine, the leading Filipino (Tagalog) weekly magazine in the Philippines. He was a fictionist, novelist, poet, playwright, radio/TV/movie scriptwriter, editor, and translator.

A multi-awarded author, among his numerous literary decorations is the Palanca Hall of Fame Award bestowed on him in 2003 for having won five first prizes in the prestigious Palanca Awards. He was also first prize winner in Filipino Epic in the 1998 Centennial Literary Awards sponsored by the Philippine Government.

He was a native of Bagani Ubbog, Candon, Ilocos Sur.

== Awards ==
- Cultural Center of the Philippines (CCP) Writing Grants
- Palanca Awards
- Talaang Ginto-Gantimpalang Collantes
- Centennial Literary Awards
- Pedro Bucaneg Award
- Gov. Roque Ablan Awards for Iloko Literature (GRAAFIL)
