= Dumangas Church =

Roman Catholic church in Iloilo, Philippines

- Saint Augustine Parish Church
- Church facade in 2026

- Location in the Visayas Location in the Philippines
- 10°49′15.71″N 122°42′44.86″E
- Location: Dumangas, Iloilo
- Country: Philippines
- Denomination: Roman Catholic

History
- Status: Parish church
- Founded: 1572; 454 years ago
- Dedication: Saint Augustine

Architecture
- Functional status: Active
- Heritage designation: National Historical Landmark
- Designated: 1983
- Architectural type: Church building
- Style: Gothic Byzantine

Administration
- Archdiocese: Jaro

Saint Augustine Parish Church, commonly known as Dumangas Church, is a Roman Catholic church located in Dumangas, Iloilo, Philippines. It is under the jurisdiction of the Archdiocese of Jaro. The church is considered as the first and oldest Roman Catholic church in Western Visayas. The National Historical Commission of the Philippines (NHCP) declared it a national landmark in 1983.

== History ==
Founded in 1572, the church was burned down in 1628. It was reconstructed but was destroyed by an earthquake in 1787. The church was rebuilt in 1887 and was completed in 1896. It has a Gothic Byzantine architectural style, and is made of red bricks and coral stones. NHCP in 1983 declared the church a national historical landmark.

National historical marker installed in 1989

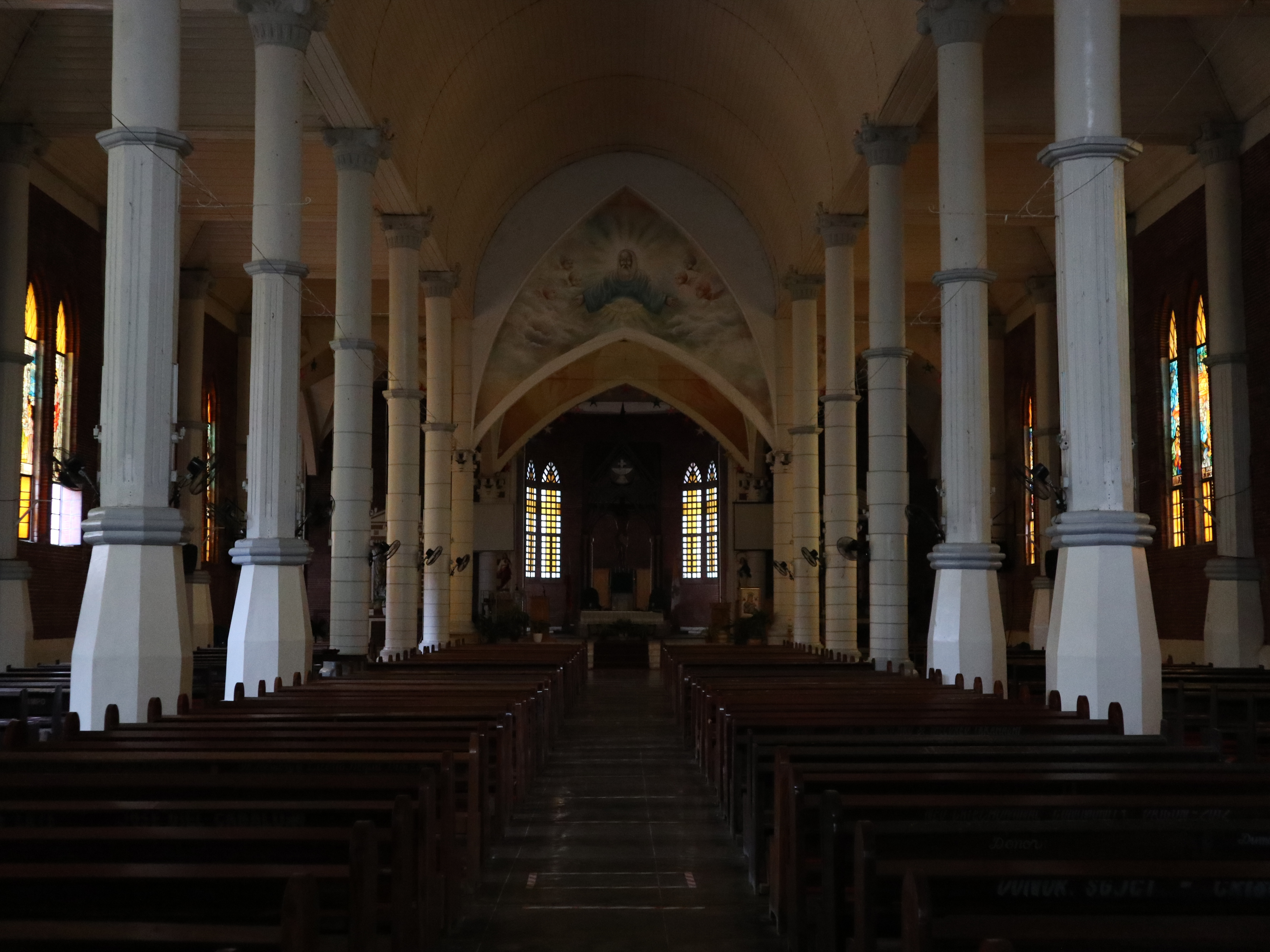
Church interior in 2023
