= Ricaredo Demetillo =

Filipino essayist, poet and playwright

- Born: June 2, 1920; Dumangas, Iloilo, Philippines
- Died: 1998 (aged 77–78)
- Education: University of Iowa
- Occupations: Writer, poet
- Spouse: Angelita Delariarte (m. 1944–1998)
- Children: 3
- Writing career
- Language: English
- Notable work: Barter in Panay: An Epic
- Notable awards: Don Carlos Palanca Memorial Awards for Literature (multiple)

Ricaredo Demetillo (June 10, 1920 – 1998) was a Filipino essayist, poet, and playwright. Demetillo was one of the most important and prolific literary figures in the Philippines during the Twentieth Century and has won numerous awards for his writing.

== Biography ==
Demetillo was born in Dumangas, Iloilo. He first realized that he had a talent for writing in 1939 while he was a seminarian at the Protestant Central Philippine College (now Central Philippine University). He was able to seriously pursue his talent at Indiana University as a Rockefeller scholar. In 1952 he completed his master's degree in fine arts in English and creative writing at the State University in Iowa. That same year, he returned to teach in his alma mater, Silliman University, where he also served as the adviser of Sands and Coral, the literary journal of the university. Three years later, he left his post at Silliman University to teach literature and the humanities at the University of the Philippines.

He is the author of poetry collections, including No Certain Weather (1956), La Via: A Spiritual Journey (1958), Barter in Panay: An Epic and Daedalus and Other Poems (1961), The Scarecrow Christ (1970), The City and the Thread of Light (1973), Lazarus, Troubadour (1974), Masks and Signature (1984), and First and Last Fruits (1989). He also published a play, The Heart of Emptiness Is Black, (1979); a novel, The Genesis of a Troubled Vision (1976), and literary criticisms, The Authentic Voice of Poetry (1962) and Major and Minor Keys: Critical Essays on Philippine Fiction and Poetry (1987).

Demetillo's Barter in Panay, an English language epic based on the Ilonggo epic Maragtas, is claimed to be the first true literary epic in the Philippines.

== Awards ==
His numerous awards include first prize for play in the 1973 Don Carlos Palanca Memorial Awards for Literature, third prize for poetry in the 1975 Don Carlos Palanca Memorial Awards for Literature, second prize for essay in the 1984 Don Carlos Palanca Memorial Awards for Literature, UP Golden Jubilee Award for Criticism (1958), Jose Rizal Centennial Award for essay (1961), Republic Cultural Heritage Award for Literature (1968), Southeast Asian Writers Awards (1985) and the Gawad Pambansang Alagad ni Balagtas of the Unyon ng mga Manunulat ng Pilipinas (1992).

== Personal life ==
He married Angelita Delariarte and had four children: a daughter, Becky Demetillo‑Abraham, and three sons, Darnay, Lester, and Weston Demetillo. He died in 1998.
