= Dominador Ilio =

Philippine poet and professor (1913–2006)

- Dominador Ilio (c. 1960)
- Born: November 15, 1913; Malinao, Aklan, Philippine Islands
- Died: February 7, 2006 (aged 92); Aklan, Philippines
- Occupations: Poet, Professor, Engineer
- Writing career
- Pen name: Isaias Topacio Domingo, Basilio, Crisostomo de la Cruz, and J.D. Ibarra
- Language: English
- Notable works: The Diplomat, The Vigil of Freedom and Icarus in Catechism Class
- Notable awards: Most Distinguished Alumnus, University of the Philippines, UP Golden Jubilee Literary Contest, Republic Anniversary Poetry Contest.
- Movement: Modernism

Dominador "Dom" Ibarra Ilio (November 15, 1913 - February 7, 2006) was a poet and professor born in Malinao, Capiz (now part of Aklan). He is considered a pioneer of Philippine literature in English as a recognized poet and author both in the Philippines and in the United States. He was an engineer by profession.

== Biography ==
=== Early life ===
Ilio was born in Malinao, Aklan, the Philippines in November 1913 to Hilarion Ilio. He received his bachelor's degrees in both Civil Engineering and Geodetic Engineering at the University of the Philippines Diliman, where he joined the Beta Epsilon Fraternity in 1937. He later obtained his master's degree in hydraulics in the State University of Iowa.

=== Writing career ===
According to Hector Santos, Ilio is a very important and pioneering Filipino poet. Along with Edith Tiempo and Ricaredo Demetillo, Ilio studied under Paul Engle in the famous Iowa writing workshop in the early 1950s. Their poems were included in a special issue of Poetry: A magazine of verse in 1952.

== Works ==
Dominador Ilio's poems have been compiled in The Diplomat and Other Poems (1955) and Collected Poems of Dominador I. Ilio (1989). Aside from verse, he wrote books of fiction and non-fiction, namely: Guerilla Memoirs (a novel), Madia-as (tales and legends in verse), The Katipunan of Aklan, and Vagaries of a Wild River. He is also included in Gémino Abad's and Edna Manlapaz's Man of Earth (Ateneo, 1989) and its sequel, A Native Clearing (UP Press, 1993) and in Nick Carbo's anthology Returning a Borrowed Tongue, a collection of Filipino poetry in English, published by Coffee House Press, 1995. While studying in the United States, Ilio attended Paul Engle's Poetry Workshop in Iowa and received citations. He would later win the honorable mention for his novel State of War at the UP Golden Jubilee Literary Contest. He also won in the Republic Anniversary Poetry Contest. His poems "The Diplomat" and "Icarus in Catechism Class" are often anthologized and included in textbooks of literature.

=== List of Works ===
- The Diplomat and other Poems. Quezon City, Diliman: The Guinhalinan Press, 1955.
- Guerilla Memoirs. The University of Michigan, 1993.
- Madia-as Tales and Legends, (self-published), 1994.
- Collected Poems of Dominador Ilio (1935-1988), the University of Michigan (original), 1989.

=== Anthologies ===
- Casper, Leonard. Six Filipino Poets w/ notes by N.V.M. Gonzalez, Manila: Benipayo Press, 1955.
- Botteghe Obscure Literary Journal, Autumn Issue, 1956.
- Carbo, Nick. Returning a Borrowed Tongue: An Anthology of Filipino and Filipino American Poetry, Coffee House Press, 1995.

== Legacy ==
Until his retirement in 1978, he was a professor of hydraulics at the University of the Philippines College of Engineering, where he also served as head of the Engineering Science Department; and College Secretary. Aside from this, he became the Secretary of the UP Alumni Engineers in 1954 and was selected as the Most Distinguished Engineering Alumnus in 1977. The Prof. Dominador I. Ilio Award is an award named in his honor in order to recognize the graduating student who showed excellence not only in academics, but also service, leadership, and extracurricular activities.

== Personal life and death ==
Dominador Ilio married Clotilde Yerro with whom he sired three sons: Dominador Jr., an activist during the time of Martial Law in the Philippines; Dennis, a computer engineer based in New York City; and Kenneth, a scientist turned photographer (and also a writer who has been included in short story anthologies in the US and the Philippines) based in Chicago. In 1973, Prof. Dominador Ilio was arrested at his UP campus home because state agents could not find his son, Dominador, Jr. He was only released from Camp Crame a month later, once his son had been captured.

Aside from teaching and writing, Dominador, Sr. was known among friends to be an expert bridge player. He died on February 7, 2006, at age 92.
