= The Wide Ionian Sea =

Play by Peter Solis Nery

The Wide Ionian Sea is a play in English by Filipino playwright Peter Solis Nery. It was awarded as the sole winner in the one-act play category of the Palanca Awards for Literature in 2010.

== Plot summary ==
Set in a town called Ithaca on Panay Island, Mentor, an older man of 35, meets the 19-year-old Telemachus at an internet cafe. The older man invites the younger to his house, and seduces him by way of his affected ways and beautiful mind. They have an affair and lived together as Mentor finds inspiration in Telemachus to write a book of 100 erotic sonnets which he hopes will establish his place in Philippine literature. The youth betrays Mentor in secret, and leaves him. Despite his broken heart, Mentor perseveres and achieves success with his poetry project. Telemachus, who has become an insomniac after leaving Mentor, returns to congratulate the poet and to explain why he left. The play ends with Telemachus "finding sleep" in Mentor's arms.

== Publication ==
The Wide Ionian Sea was published in Funny, Sad, and Dangerous: Three Award-winning Short Plays (KDP: 2019) alongside other award-winning Nery plays, namely: the tragicomic Gladiolas [sic], and the comedy Tic-tac-toe.
