= Jose Cabalum Sr. =

Filipino educator (1915–2006)

Jose Cabalum Sr.

Jose Cabalum Sr. (March 20, 1915—August 18, 2006) was a Filipino educator and founder of the Cabalum Western College in Iloilo City.

== Early life ==
Jose Diel Cabalum Sr. was born on March 20, 1915, to Catalina Ginete Diel and Eustaquio Cabalum in Sabang, Barrio Lublub, Dumangas, Iloilo. He married Jovita Cabitlas of Zarraga, Iloilo on April 26, 1939, and had five children.

== Education ==
The young Jose took courses in typewriting, stenography and bookkeeping at Iloilo Gregg College and at Iloilo Business School, and graduated on such courses in 1935 at Manila Gregg College. He studied high school at Central Philippine University, finishing in 1938. He continued his tertiary education in the same school and took B.S. in Commerce, Major in Accounting and graduated in 1950. Imbued by his desire for intellectual growth and advancement, he continued his studies and earned professional education units from the University of San Agustin in 1956. He then studied law in the University of Iloilo, earning his Bachelor of Laws degree in 1960. He completed the study of freelance and specialty journalism and authorship in 1965 from the prestigious International Correspondence School in London.

== Career ==
In 1939, he started to serve the Government as Stenographer and Special Deputy Provincial Sheriff of Iloilo and in 1941 he is the 1st Lt. Emergency Provincial Guard of 3rd Administrative District of Iloilo.

During the outbreak of World War II, Jose with Tomas Confesor joined the Resistance Movement in Panay against the Japanese invasion. He was the Intelligence Officer of the 3rd Administrative District of Iloilo. During the later part of the year, he was commissioned as Junior Officer of the Provincial Commander at Durog, Leon, Iloilo.

On October 5, 1945, Jose Cabalum Sr., opened the National Commercial School now known as Cabalum Western College. The founder taught Typewriting, Stenography, Bookkeeping and Business English & Correspondence. He was the School Director from 1947 to 1961 whilst working for Insular Life Assurance as an underwriter.

He pursued in rendering service to the Government, signifying his love of country and fellowmen. In 1962 to 1963, Jose served as Chief of Land Tax Division at Treasurer’s Office in Iloilo City. From 1964 to 1966, he was transferred to the Court of Agrarian Relations, Branch 11, Roxas City, as Deputy Clerk of Court and continue his services as Deputy Clerk in Iloilo City up to 1967. In 1969 to 1971, he became Chief Deputy Assessor of Iloilo City and promoted as Assistant City Assessor of Iloilo City from 1972 to 1979.

As College President from 1979 to 1991, he valued education as the primordial factor to one’s success. He sponsored scholarship programs to financially poor but deserving students and helped finance the outreach program of the college. After his term as College President, his service continued as Chairman of the Board of Trustees from 1992 to 1996. Much of his desires to impart his acquired knowledge and expertise, he authored several book in Typewriting, Stenography, Personal Development, Business English & Correspondence and Civil Service Reviewer for Professional & Sub-Professional examinations.

== Awards and recognitions ==
Jose D. Cabalum Sr. received numerous awards such as the Most Outstanding Ilonggo Entrepreneur, Bronze Award in both National & International Golden Award of Meritorious and Outstanding Service; the Most Outstanding Head Educator for Exemplary Leadership rendered to the public in the field of education and other awards from institutions & organizations.

Jose D. Cabalum Sr. died on August 18, 2006, leaving his children Jose Cabalum Jr., Dr. Ma. Theresa Cabalum, Fr. Jesus Cabalum, Johnny Cabalum and Jorge Cabalum .
