= Peter Solis Nery =

Filipino writer and filmmaker

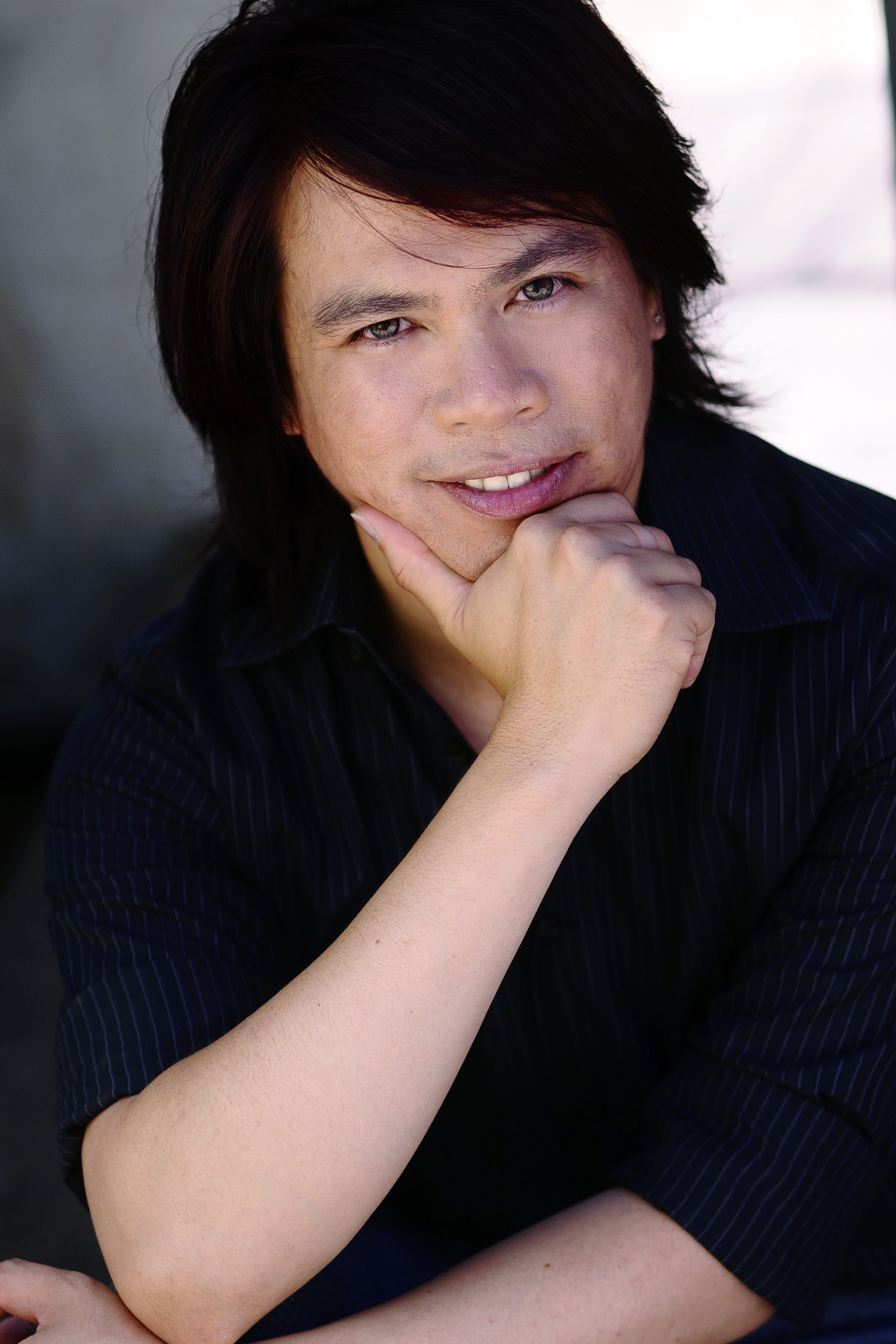
- Born: January 6, 1969 (age 57); Dumangas, Iloilo, Philippines
- Education: University of the Philippines Visayas (BA); SVD Christ the King Mission Seminary (AA); STI West Negros University (BS)
- Occupations: Poet, writer, author, actor, filmmaker
- Writing career
- Language: English, Filipino, Hiligaynon
- Website: petersolisnery.com

Peter Solis Nery is a Filipino poet, fictionist, author, and filmmaker. Writing in Hiligaynon, he is a Carlos Palanca Memorial Awards for Literature Hall of Fame Awardee, the Cultural Center of the Philippines (CCP) Literary Grant, and the All-Western Visayas Literary Contest (National Commission for Culture and the Arts) winner. In 2015, he became the first Filipino author to be invited to the Sharjah International Book Fair in the United Arab Emirates. Writing in English, Filipino, and Hiligaynon, he has authored at least 35 books, and has written screenplays. He wrote and edited newspapers in Iloilo City before becoming a nurse in the United States.

As an actor, Nery briefly appeared in Tikoy Aguiluz's film on cybersex, www.XXX.com, of which he was also the assistant director. He has also written, produced, and directed a full-length feature film in Hiligaynon, Gugma sa Panahon sang Bakunawa (Love in the Time of the Bakunawa), which was a finalist at the 1st Sineng Pambansa National Film Competition of the Film Development Council of the Philippines. Nery resides in Reisterstown, Maryland, and continues to write in at least three languages.

He was awarded the UP Distinguished Alumnus Award in Championing Hiligaynon Literature and Regional Culture in 2023.

== Early life and education ==
Peter Solis Nery was born on January 6, 1969, and raised in the coastal town of Dumangas, Iloilo, Philippines. He is the eldest among five siblings and his parents were both public school teachers. Peter attended primary school at the Dumangas Central Elementary School, completed his secondary education at the Dumangas Polytechnic College (now Iloilo State College of Fisheries), where he was consistently a first honor student from grade school to high school. He finished his bachelor of science degree in Biology from the University of the Philippines in the Visayas, where he was named Most Outstanding Student (1989) and Most Outstanding Graduate of 1990. He also received the President’s Award of Merit as Outstanding Student in his graduation year.

While at school, Peter honed his talent for writing. Under his editorship, he led the UPV College of Arts and Sciences' official publication, Pagbutlak (Sunrise) to become the region’s best at the 1989 College Press Awards. Peter also had attended the SVD Christ the King Mission Seminary in Quezon City where he took an Associate of Arts in Philosophy degree in 1992-1993. In 2004, he earned his Bachelor of Science in Nursing degree from the West Negros College (now West Negros University) in Bacolod, Negros Occidental.

== Writing career ==
=== Early works ===
After the EDSA Revolution of 1986, Peter found himself in a new wave of Philippine literature. There was a resurgence of interest in nationalistic writing. At U.P., Peter was lucky to meet Leoncio Deriada (2001 Palanca Hall of Fame awardee) who encouraged him to write in Hiligaynon. Peter won his first national award in writing for his poetry in Hiligaynon, Mga Ambahanon kag Pangamuyo sang Bata nga Nalimtan sa Wayang (Songs and Prayers of a Child Forgotten in the Fields)in 1992. For his performance poetry Si Eva, si Delilah, si Ruth, kag ang Alput (Eva, Delilah, Ruth, and the Prostitute) at the Premio Operiano Italia, he was named Hari sang Binalaybay (King of Hiligaynon Poetry) in 1993, a title he held until 1998. During his student activism days at the university, he wrote his first book, I Flew a Kite for Pepe, in 1993. He admits, “I cringe now at my boldness to call it poetry then but I always thought that the book had a big heart. I still cry when I read it.” It was followed by his earth song and hymn to the planet, First Few Notes of a Green Symphony.

=== Transition ===
While working as a religious missionary in Macau, Peter became more introspective and started his memoirs. The Essential Thoughts of a Purple Cat was published by Giraffe Books in 1996; Moon River, Butterflies and Me in 1997; and My Life as a Hermit again by Giraffe in 1998. In 1995, he won the NCCA Western Visayas Poetry Competition for his collection Umanhon nga Gugma (Love of the Rural Folks). Some of the poems were translated, reworked, and included in his provocative collection, Rated R (Giraffe Books, 1997).

Peter published four titles in 1997: the playful poetry collection Shy Evocations of Childhood and Other Poems that Came under Hypnosis, and Rated R for Giraffe; Shorts, a collection of haiku-like poems, and the memoir Moon River, Butterflies and Me for New Day.

He won his first Palanca gold medal for his magical realist Hiligaynon Short Story Lirio about a deaf-mute who is a victim of marital rape. Furthermore, his first screenplay, Buyong, about a Katipunero revolutionary from Aklan won third prize in the screenplay category of the Centennial Literary Prize. Later that year, his second screenplay, Tayo na sa Buwan (Let’s Go to the Moon), won an honorable mention at the Film Development Foundation of the Philippines.

Eventually, he started his own publishing company and produced A Loneliness Greater than Love (2000), an exploration of homoerotic themes; and Fantasia (2000), a collection of his Palanca-winning fiction. In 2001, he published Rain as Gentle as Tears, a sequel to his 1997 Shorts collection, and The Prince of Ngoyngoy (The Prince of Sob), a collection of lyric poems in Hiligaynon that established Peter as the Ilonggo epitome of emotional poetry.

In 2003, he launched Pierre: The Magazine of Peter Solis Nery. It delivered three monthly issues.

When opportunity came in 2006, he went to the United States to work as a nurse. For 100 days in 2005, Peter endeavored to write 100 erotic sonnets in Hiligaynon. He called it Kakunyag (Thrill). It was launched during the National Arts Month 2006 in Iloilo, and was serialized in a newspaper. He won a Palanca in 2006 for his Hiligaynon psycho-thriller short story, Ang Kapid (The Twins). The win provided him another encouragement to persevere in writing in the Hiligaynon. In 2007, Peter won his second Palanca gold for his historical Hiligaynon Short Story Candido, about the anting-anting (amulet) of the revolutionary Candido Iban. The following year, he won his third Palanca gold for his play in English, The Passion of Jovita Fuentes, about the tragic love of the first Filipino international opera diva and first female National Artist in Music. Peter also completed translation of his 100 Erotic Sonnets in the Hiligaynon into English in 2008.

== Nursing career ==
Nery enrolled in Nursing as he continued to write for the newspaper. He graduated his Bachelor of Science in Nursing in October 2004. He went to the United States in February 2006 and became a Registered Nurse in California in May of the same year and started working as an orthopedic nurse in Los Angeles in 2007. In October 2008, he was given various awards for his commitment to his nursing profession including the Daisy Award for Extraordinary Nurses.

== Peter Solis Nery Foundation ==
The Peter Solis Nery Foundation, or The Peter Solis Nery Foundation for Hiligaynon Literature and the Arts, Inc. was established in September 2012 by Nery, right after his induction into the Palanca Awards Hall of Fame. The foundation, which aims to promote, preserve, and propagate Hiligaynon literature, and Filipino art and culture, through research, publications, productions, education, and cultural dissemination, was incorporated by the Philippine Securities and Exchange Commission on November 5, 2012. Following immediately, the foundation created the Peter’s Prize for Excellence in Hiligaynon Writing that first gave out awards in September 2013. In May 2014, the foundation sponsored a month-long online Hiligaynon poetry workshop called Poem-a-thon with Peter Solis Nery. In August 2014, the foundation published five anthology books of new Hiligaynon writings culled from the Peter’s Prize competitions and the Poem-a-thon workshop.

== Personal life ==
Nery is gay, and was married to an American man from 2008 until the latter's death when Nery was 46.

Nery is a Roman Catholic despite the church’s stand on homosexuality.

== Published works ==
- I Flew a Kite for Pepe (New Day Publishers. Quezon City: 1993.) ISBN 971-10-0542-5
- First Few Notes of a Green Symphony (Giraffe Books. Quezon City: 1994.) ISBN 971-8967-06-0
- The Essential Thoughts of a Purple Cat (Giraffe Books. Quezon City: 1996.) ISBN 971-8967-31-1
- Rated R (Giraffe Books. Quezon City: 1997.) ISBN 971-8967-62-1
- Shorts (New Day Publishers. Quezon City: 1997.) ISBN 971-10-1012-7
- Moon River, Butterflies, and Me (New Day Publishers. Quezon City: 1997.) ISBN 971-10-1013-5
- Shy Evocations of Childhood (Giraffe Books. Quezon City: 1997.) ISBN 971-8967-67-2
- My Life as a Hermit (Giraffe Books. Quezon City: 1998.) ISBN 971-8967-74-5
- Fireflies for a Yuppie (Giraffe Books. Quezon City: 1998.) ISBN 971-8967-75-3
- A Loneliness Greater than Love (DreamWings Publishing. Iloilo: 2000.) ISBN 971-92146-0-0
- Fantasia (DreamWings Publishing. Iloilo: 2000.) ISBN 971-92146-1-9
- Rain as Gentle as Tears (DreamWings Publishing. Iloilo: 2001.) ISBN 971-92146-2-7
- The Prince of Ngoyngoy (DreamWings Publishing. Iloilo: 2001.) ISBN 971-92146-3-5
- The Passion of Jovita Fuentes (New Day Publishers. Quezon City: 2009.) ISBN 978-971-10-1206-9
- 100 Erotic Sonnets from the Hiligaynon (CreateSpace. U.S.A.: 2010.) ISBN 1-4537-1071-X
- Love in the Time of the Bakunawa (CreateSpace. U.S.A.: 2012.) ISBN 1-478-13998-6
- If the Shoe Fits: Or, The Five Men Imelda Marcos Meets in Heaven (CreateSpace. U.S.A.: 2012.) ISBN 1-466-22033-3
- Cory, Full of Grace (CreateSpace. U.S.A.: 2012) ISBN 1-478-14075-5
- Kakunyag: Erotic Sonnets in Hiligaynon (CreateSpace. U.S.A.: 2012) ISBN 1-481-01687-3
- Stories in a Mellifluous Language (CreateSpace. U.S.A.: 2012) ISBN 1-481-04307-2
- Peter’s Prize Very, Very Short Stories in Hiligaynon (CreateSpace. U.S.A.: 2014) ISBN 1-500-24030-3
- Peter’s Prize Love Poems in Hiligaynon (CreateSpace. U.S.A.: 2014) ISBN 1-500-26138-6
- Peter’s Prize Children’s Stories and Poems in Hiligaynon (CreateSpace. U.S.A.:2014) ISBN 1-500-33582-7
- Peter’s Prize The Saddest Love Stories Ever Told in Hiligaynon (CreateSpace. U.S.A.: 2014) ISBN 1-500-38056-3
- The Poem-a-thon Anthology: Mga Binalaybay sang Mayo 2014 (CreateSpace. U.S.A.: 2014) ISBN 1-500-65312-8
- The Passion of Jovita Fuentes: International edition (CreateSpace. U.S.A.: 2015) ISBN 1-515-14242-6
- Welcome to Grindr (CreateSpace. U.S.A.: 2016) ISBN 1-515-14343-0
- Creative Writing: DIWA Senior High School Series (Diwa Learning Systems, Inc. Makati City: 2017) ISBN 978-971-46-0995-2
- At My Father's Wake: 10 Elegies in 3 Languages (CreateSpace. U.S.A.: 2019) ISBN 1-537-10540-X
- After: Prose Poems (KDP. U.S.A.: 2019) ISBN 1-071-32117-X
- Funny, Sad, and Dangerous (KDP. U.S.A.: 2019) ISBN 1-089-03104-1
- Nothing’s Lost: Stories by Peter Solis Nery (KDP. U.S.A.: 2020) ISBN 979-863-71-5686-3
- The (Almost) Fabulous: a self-portrait in bits and pieces (KDP. U.S.A.: 2020) ISBN 979-866-98-9222-7
- 7: Palanca Award-winning Stories in Glorious Hiligaynon (KDP. U.S.A.: 2020) ISBN 979-858-35-6120-9
- We Begin in Awe: Close Encounters with the PSN Corpus (KDP. U.S.A.: 2020) ISBN 979-858-49-5704-9
- What We Had: 69 men in 100 erotic poems (KDP. U.S.A.: 2024) ISBN 979-832-85-4130-5

== Palanca Awards won ==
- 3rd prize, Poetry for Children (English) for Thirteen Ways of Looking at Books, 2024
- 1st prize, Short Story (Filipino) for Ang Tariktik, 2023
- 1st prize, Short Story (Hiligaynon) for Ang Macatol kag ang “Queen of Relief”, 2022
- 2nd prize, Poetry for Children (English) for Picnic, Symphony & Other Concepts a 4th Grader Needs to Know, 2022
- 2nd prize, Short Story (Hiligaynon) for Ang Milagro sa Ermita, 2017
- 1st prize, One-Act Play (English) for Tic-Tac-Toe, 2016
- 1st prize, Poetry for Children (English) for The Rainbow Collection, 2015
- 1st prize, One-Act Play (Filipino) for Gladiolas, 2014
- 3rd prize, Full-length Play (Filipino) for Agimat, 2014
- 3rd prize, Poetry for Children (English) for Those Colorful Parts, 2014
- 1st prize, Short Story (Hiligaynon) for Si Padre Olan kag ang Dios, 2013
- Hall of Fame Award, 2012
- 1st prize, Poetry for Children (English) for Punctuation, 2012
- 2nd prize, Poetry for Children (Filipino) for Sa Mundo ng mga Kulisap, 2012
- 1st prize, Short Story (Hiligaynon) for Donato Bugtot, 2011
- 2nd prize, Full-length Play (English) for If the Shoe Fits: Or, The Five Men Imelda Marcos Meets in Heaven, 2011
- 2nd prize, Poetry for Children (English) for The Shape of Happiness & Other Poems, 2011
- 3rd prize, One-Act Play (English) for The Wide Ionian Sea, 2010
- 1st prize, Full-length Play (English) for The Passion of Jovita Fuentes, 2008
- 1st prize, Short Story (Hiligaynon) for Candido, 2007
- 2nd prize, Short Story (Hiligaynon) for Ang Kapid, 2006
- 3rd prize, Short Story (Hiligaynon) for Ang Pangayaw, 2000
- 1st prize, Short Story (Hiligaynon) for Lirio, 1998
