= Carlos Palanca (born 1869) =

Chinese-Filipino businessman (1869–1950)

- Tan Guin Lay 陳迎來
- Pronunciation: IPA: /Tan˨ Giɪŋ˨ Lai˨˦/
- Born: Tan Geng Lay; September 1, 1869; Amoy, Fukien, Qing China
- Died: September 2, 1950 (aged 81); Manila, Philippines
- Resting place: La Loma Cemetery
- Other names: Carlos T. Palanca, Sr. Tan Guin Lay; Tan Quin Lay
- Citizenship: Chinese (1869-1893); Spanish (1893-1944); Filipino (1944-1950)
- Occupation: Businessman
- Known for: Founder of La Tondeña Distillers, Inc. (now Ginebra San Miguel), namesake of the Carlos Palanca Memorial Awards; Member of Asociación China Pro-Nipona

Carlos Tanguinlay Palanca, Sr. (September 1, 1869 – September 2, 1950), also known as Tan Guin Lay (Chinese: 陳迎來; Pe̍h-ōe-jī: Tân Gêng-lâi) or sometimes misspelled as Tan Quin Lay, was a Chinese Filipino businessman and philanthropist in the Philippines during the late Spanish colonial era, American colonial era, and early post-independence period.

== Early life ==
Carlos Tanguinlay Palanca, Sr. was born named with Hokkien Chinese: 陳迎來; Pe̍h-ōe-jī: Tân Gêng-lâi (later romanized as "Tan Guin Lay" or "Tan Guing Lay" in Spanish Philippines) in 1869 in Amoy (now Xiamen), Fukien, Qing China.

== Career ==
Carlos Tanguinlay Palanca Sr. migrated to the Philippines in 1884 and later lived between Quiapo and San Miguel districts of the City of Manila, which later the street name of Echague Street was later renamed to honor Carlos Palanca, Sr. Tan Guin Lay adopted the name "Carlos L. Palanca", after his godfather of the same name whose Hokkien Chinese name was Tan Quien Sien, who also adopted the name "Carlos G. Palanca" from a Spanish Field Marshal and Diplomat, Carlos G. Palanca. Tan Guin Lay worked as an apprentice in a hardware store ran by a relative before setting up his own store in 1890, and became involved in textile trading.

He established La Tondeña Distillers, Inc, a distillery which grew to be a major player in the Philippine alcoholic beverage industry.

== Death ==
He died on September 2, 1950 at 81 years old, survived by wife Rosa Gonzales-Palanca, and 6 children.

His descendants (elder son) Carlos "Charlie" G. Palanca Jr., Carlos III and Carlos IV later managed La Tondeña.

== Legacy ==
Carlos Palanca, Sr. was one of the most prominent Chinese-Filipino businessmen during the American colonial era in the Philippines.

In 1987, the heirs of Carlos Palanca III entered La Tondeña Distillers, Inc. in a joint venture with San Miguel Corporation (SMC). La Tondeña was eventually absorbed by the SMC, and was renamed as Ginebra San Miguel (GSM) in 2003, then in 2017, became a subsidiary of San Miguel Food and Beverage, Inc. (SMFBI) in Tondo, Manila. Palanca's heirs were able to establish the Carlos Palanca Memorial Awards for Literature in his honor.

His former residence built in 1940 along Taft Avenue in Pasay was a protected heritage site until it was demolished in 2017.
