= Palanca Awards =

Awards given annually for achievements in literature within the Philippines

Carlos Palanca Memorial Awards for Literature
- Carlos Palanca Memorial Awards for Literature
- Awarded for: Excellence in literary works
- Country: Philippines
- First award: 1950
- Website: palancaawards.com.ph

The Carlos Palanca Memorial Awards for Literature, popularly known as the Palanca Memorial Awards, are a set of literary awards for Philippine writers. Usually referred to as the "Pulitzer Prize of the Philippines," it is the country's highest literary honor in terms of prestige. It was named after Carlos T. Palanca, Sr., the Filipino-Chinese businessman and philanthropist.

The literary competition began with a long-term vision straddling two complementary tracks: to provide incentives for Filipino writers to craft the best literary pieces, and to be a treasury to the country's literary gems. Winning works are entered in the competition either as previously published pieces or in manuscript form. The Palanca Memorial Awards, organized by the Carlos Palanca Foundation, Inc. is one of the Philippines' longest-running awards programs. Among its winners include several National Artists for Literature, including Nick Joaquin, Edith L. Tiempo, Gemino H. Abad, Cirilo F. Bautista, F. Sionil Jose, NVM Gonzales, Bienvenido Lumbera, Amado V. Hernandez, and Virgilio Almario.

== History ==
The Palanca Memorial Awards was established in 1950 to inspire and recognize Philippine writers, including poets, playwrights and screenwriters, and writers for children. It started giving out prizes in the Short Story (English) and Maikling Kwento (Filipino) in 1951. In the 1960s, the Palanca Memorial Awards Committee started to fund the publication of Palanca Memorial Award-winning plays, and production funds were committed in 1975.

Since 1954, the awards night has been held on September 01, to commemorate the birthday of Carlos T. Palanca Sr. (although there have been changes of dates in the intervening years). Venues that have hosted the celebratory dinner include the Philippine Columbian Clubhouse, New Selecta, Hilton Hotel, Hyatt Regency Hotel, La Tondeña Building, Philippine International Convention Center, Dusit Hotel, the Peninsula Manila, and Marquis Events Place.

== Categories ==
There are currently 22 categories in the Palanca Memorial Awards. In the early decades, writers could submit multiple submissions per category, often resulting to multiple wins [plus designated honorable mentions or special prizes]. Starting on the 60th awards year, for which the call for submissions opened on 1 March 2010, contestants can submit only one entry each in the following categories:

English Division

- Novel [category added in 1980]
- Short Story [inaugural category, 1951]
- Short Story for Children [category added in 1989]
- Essay [category added in 1979]
- Poetry [category added in 1964]
- Poetry Written for Children [category added in 2009]
- One-Act Play [category added in 1954]
- Full-Length Play [category added in 1976]

Filipino Division

- Nobela [category added in 1980]
- Maikling Kuwento (Short Story in Filipino) [inaugural category, 1951]
- Maikling Kuwentong Pambata (Short Story for Children in Filipino) [category added in 1989]
- Sanaysay (Essay in Filipino) [category added in 1979]
- Tula (Poetry in Filipino) [category added in 1964]
- Tulang Isinulat Para sa mga Bata (Poetry for Children in Filipino) [category added in 2009]
- Dulang May Isang Yugto (One-Act Play in Filipino) [category added in 1954]
- Dulang Ganap ang Haba (Full-Length Play in Filipino) [category added in 1976]
- Dulang Pampelikula (Screenplay in Filipino) [category added in 1994]

Regional Languages Division

- Short Story in Cebuano [category added in 1998]
- Short Story in Hiligaynon [category added in 1998]
- Short Story in Iluko [category added in 1998]

Kabataan Division (open only to those below 18 years of age)

- Kabataan Essay [category added in 1999]
- Kabataan Sanaysay [category added in 1999]

Discontinued Categories

- Future Fiction in English [category added in 2000, discontinued in 2007]
- Future Fiction in Filipino [category added in 2000, discontinued in 2007]
- Dulang Pantelebisyon (Teleplay) [category added in 1990, discontinued in 2007]

== Palanca Hall of Fame ==
The Palanca Hall of Fame honors was established in 1995 and is presented to a Palanca awardee who already won five first prizes in the regular categories.

- 2024

Eros Sanchez Atalia
Mikael de Lara Co
Miguel Antonio Alfredo V. Luarca
Joshua Lim So

- 2019

Lamberto Antonio

- 2014

Alice Tan Gonzales
Rodolfo Vera

- 2012

Peter Solis Nery

- 2008

Reuel Molina Aguila
Eugene Y. Evasco

- 2007

Nicolas B. Pichay

- 2006

Rodolfo Lana Jr.

- 2005

Luis P. Gatmaitan, M.D.
Manuel Buising

- 2004

Isagani R. Cruz

- 2003

Reynaldo A. Duque

- 2001

Leoncio P. Deriada
Alfred A. Yuson

- 2000

Roberto T. Añonuevo
Jose Y. Dalisay Jr.
Edgardo B. Maranan

- 1999

Elsa Martinez Coscolluela

- 1996

Ma. Luisa Aguilar Igloria

- 1995

Cirilo Bautista
Gregorio C. Brillantes
Ruth Elynia S. Mabanglo
Buenaventura S. Medina Jr.
Jesus T. Peralta
Rolando Tinio
Rene Villanueva
